= 2020–21 Sydney Thunder WBBL season =

Australian cricket team season

Sydney Thunder
2020–21 season
- Sydney Thunder 2020–21 cap logo
- Coach: Trevor Griffin
- Captain(s): Rachael Haynes
- Home ground: Sydney Showground Stadium
- League: WBBL
- Record: 7–5 (3rd)
- Finals: Champions
- Leading Run Scorer: Heather Knight – 446
- Leading Wicket Taker: Sammy-Jo Johnson – 22
- Player of the Season: Heather Knight

The 2020–21 Sydney Thunder Women's season is the sixth in the team's history. Coached by Trevor Griffin and captained by Rachael Haynes, the Thunder won the WBBL|06 championship on 28 November 2020. Playing the entirety of the tournament in a bio-secure Sydney hub due to the COVID-19 pandemic, they finished the regular season in third place before defeating the double defending champions, the Brisbane Heat, to record an epic semi-final boilover.

In the final, held at North Sydney Oval, the Sydney Thunder defeated the Melbourne Stars by seven wickets with 38 balls remaining to win their second Women's Big Bash League title. Shabnim Ismail was awarded Player of the Match after taking key early wickets against the top-qualifying Stars team, leading to a "thumping" victory for the Thunder.

== Squad ==
Each 2020–21 squad is to be made up of 15 active players. Teams can sign up to five 'marquee players', with a maximum of three of those from overseas. Marquees are classed as any overseas player, or a local player who holds a Cricket Australia national contract at the start of the WBBL|06 signing period.

Personnel changes made ahead of the season included:

- Former Australian players Alex Blackwell and Rene Farrell retired from cricket at the end of WBBL|05.
- New Zealand marquee Rachel Priest departed the Thunder, signing with the Hobart Hurricanes.
- Sammy-Jo Johnson signed a two-year contract with the Thunder, departing the Brisbane Heat.
- Lauren Smith signed with the Thunder, departing the Sydney Sixers.
- Lisa Griffith departed the Thunder, signing with the Sydney Sixers.
- England marquee Heather Knight signed with the Thunder, departing the Hobart Hurricanes.
- England marquee Tammy Beaumont signed with the Thunder, departing the Melbourne Renegades.

Changes made during the season included:

- Gabby Sutcliffe was signed from the reserve player pool. She played for the Sydney Thunder on 1 November, replacing Hannah Darlington (ankle/shin).

The table below lists the Thunder players and their key stats (including runs scored, batting strike rate, wickets taken, economy rate, catches and stumpings) for the season.

No.	Name	Nat.	Birth date	Batting style	Bowling style	G	R	SR	W	E	C	S	Notes
Batters
91	Tammy Beaumont	(England)	11 March 1991	Right-handed	–	16	209	90.47	–	–	3	–	Overseas marquee
15	Rachael Haynes	(Australia)	26 December 1986	Left-handed	Left-arm medium	16	337	109.41	–	–	8	–	Captain, Australian marquee
4	Anika Learoyd	(Australia)	14 April 2002	Right-handed	Right-arm leg spin	2	–	–	–	–	–	–	
36	Phoebe Litchfield	(Australia)	18 April 2003	Left-handed	–	14	173	99.42	–	–	13	–	
8	Rachel Trenaman	(Australia)	18 April 2001	Right-handed	Right-arm leg spin	16	253	91.66	1	9.66	1	–	
All-rounders
23	Saskia Horley	(Australia)	23 February 2000	Right-handed	Right-arm off spin	–	–	–	–	–	–	–	
58	Sammy-Jo Johnson	(Australia)	5 November 1992	Right-handed	Right-arm medium fast	16	108	113.68	22	6.63	3	–	
5	Heather Knight	(England)	26 December 1990	Right-handed	Right-arm off spin	16	446	124.92	10	6.65	1	–	Overseas marquee
33	Kate Peterson	(Australia)		Right-handed	Right-arm medium fast	1	–	–	–	–	0	–	
14	Olivia Porter	(Australia)	14 November 2001	Right-handed	Right-arm medium	–	–	–	–	–	–	–	
Wicket-keeper
21	Tahlia Wilson	(Australia)	21 October 1999	Right-handed	–	16	68	109.67	–	–	3	4	
Bowlers
34	Samantha Bates	(Australia)	17 August 1992	Right-handed	Left-arm orthodox	16	2	50.00	18	5.94	4	–	
25	Hannah Darlington	(Australia)	25 January 2002	Right-handed	Right-arm medium fast	14	20	80.00	19	6.19	5	–	
89	Shabnim Ismail	(South Africa)	5 October 1988	Left-handed	Right-arm fast	16	0	0.00	14	5.56	7	–	Overseas marquee
2	Lauren Smith	(Australia)	6 October 1996	Right-handed	Right-arm off spin	16	34	141.66	8	7.01	7	–	
	Gabby Sutcliffe	(Australia)	11 April 2002	Right-handed	Right-arm medium	1	–	–	–	–	0	–	Local replacement player

== Ladder ==
Pos	Team	Pld	W	L	NR	Pts	NRR
1	Melbourne Stars (RU)	14	8	3	3	19	0.965
2	Brisbane Heat	14	8	4	2	18	0.543
3	Sydney Thunder (C)	14	7	5	2	16	0.344
4	Perth Scorchers	14	6	6	2	14	0.355
5	Sydney Sixers	14	6	6	2	14	−0.084
6	Adelaide Strikers	14	6	7	1	13	0.135
7	Melbourne Renegades	14	4	8	2	10	−1.008
8	Hobart Hurricanes	14	3	9	2	8	−1.143

- The top 4 teams advance to the play-off phase

== Fixtures ==
All times are local time

=== Regular season ===
Match 3
25 October 2020
13:45
Scorecard

Sydney Thunder	v	Sydney Sixers

No result
North Sydney Oval
Umpires: David Taylor and Stephen Dionysius

- Sydney Sixers won the toss and elected to field
- No play was possible due to rain
- Broadcast by Seven Network and Fox Cricket

Match 5
26 October 2020
09:30
Scorecard

Sydney Thunder; 2/13 (4 overs)	v	Melbourne Stars
Heather Knight 4* (6); Nat Sciver 1/3 (1 over)

No result
North Sydney Oval
Umpires: Nathan Robert Johnstone and Muhammad Qureshi

- Melbourne Stars won the toss and elected to field
- No further play was possible due to rain
- Broadcast by Cricket Network

Match 9
31 October 2020
12:15
Scorecard

Sydney Thunder; 6/190 (20 overs)	v	Adelaide Strikers; 8/132 (20 overs)
Heather Knight 83 (39); Sarah Coyte 3/32 (4 overs)		Tahlia McGrath 46 (37); Lauren Smith 3/26 (4 overs)

Sydney Thunder won by 58 runs
Sydney Showground Stadium
Umpires: Nathan Johnstone and Jeremiah Matibiri
Player of the match: Heather Knight (Sydney Thunder)

- Adelaide Strikers won the toss and elected to field
- Broadcast by Seven Network and Fox Cricket

Match 14
1 November 2020
10:20
Scorecard

Sydney Thunder; 3/80 (12.1 overs)	v	Brisbane Heat; 7/30 (5 overs)
Rachel Trenaman 38 (34); Nicola Hancock 1/9 (2.1 overs)		Jess Jonassen 14 (9); Heather Knight 3/4 (1 over)

Sydney Thunder won by 14 runs (DLS method)
Sydney Showground Stadium
Umpires: Roberto Howard and Tony Wilds
Player of the match: Samantha Bates (Sydney Thunder)

- Brisbane Heat won the toss and elected to field
- Sydney Thunder's innings reduced to 12.1 overs due to rain delay
- Brisbane Heat were set a revised target of 45 from 5 overs
- Broadcast by Seven Network and Fox Cricket

Match 19
4 November 2020
14:30
Scorecard

Sydney Thunder; 4/144 (20 overs)	v	Perth Scorchers; 120 (19.4 overs)
Rachael Haynes 61* (51); Piepa Cleary 1/8 (1 over)		Beth Mooney 61 (49); Samantha Bates 3/9 (4 overs)

Sydney Thunder won by 24 runs
Blacktown International Sportspark
Umpires: Roberto Howard and Stephen Dionysius
Player of the match: Rachael Haynes (Sydney Thunder)

- Perth Scorchers won the toss and elected to field
- Broadcast by Fox Cricket and Cricket Network

Match 22
7 November 2020
14:30
Scorecard

Melbourne Renegades; 110 (20 overs)	v	Sydney Thunder; 7/108 (20 overs)
Sophie Molineux 34 (42); Sammy-Jo Johnson 4/26 (4 overs)		Rachel Trenaman 26 (28); Sophie Molineux 2/19 (4 overs)

Melbourne Renegades won by 2 runs
Hurstville Oval
Umpires: Roberto Howard and Bede Sajowitz
Player of the match: Sammy-Jo Johnson (Sydney Thunder)

- Sydney Thunder won the toss and elected to field
- Broadcast by Cricket Network

Match 25
8 November 2020
09:30
Scorecard

Sydney Thunder; 7/129 (20 overs)	v	Hobart Hurricanes; 7/128 (20 overs)
Heather Knight 61* (49); Amy Smith 2/15 (3 overs)		Rachel Priest 83* (64); Heather Knight 2/12 (3 overs)

Sydney Thunder won by 1 run
Hurstville Oval
Umpires: Jeremiah Matibiri and Stephen Dionysius
Player of the match: Heather Knight (Sydney Thunder)

- Hobart Hurricanes won the toss and elected to field
- Broadcast by Cricket Network

Match 32
11 November 2020
19:05 (D/N)
Scorecard

Sydney Thunder; 9/111 (20 overs)	v	Brisbane Heat; 2/115 (16.3 overs)
Rachel Trenaman 27 (30); Amelia Kerr 4/20 (4 overs)		Georgia Redmayne 59* (45); Sammy-Jo Johnson 1/24 (3 overs)

Brisbane Heat won by 8 wickets (with 21 balls remaining)
Blacktown International Sportspark
Umpires: Troy Penman and Tony Wilds
Player of the match: Georgia Redmayne (Brisbane Heat)

- Sydney Thunder won the toss and elected to bat
- Broadcast by Fox Cricket and Cricket Network

Match 36
14 November 2020
19:05 (D/N)
Scorecard

Sydney Thunder; 5/131 (20 overs)	v	Melbourne Stars; 2/135 (16.5 overs)
Rachael Haynes 51 (49); Katherine Brunt 2/19 (3 overs)		Mignon du Preez 57* (37); Hannah Darlington 1/25 (3 overs)

Melbourne Stars won by 8 wickets (with 19 balls remaining)
Sydney Showground Stadium
Umpires: Andrew Crozier and Tony Wilds
Player of the match: Nat Sciver (Melbourne Stars)

- Melbourne Stars won the toss and elected to field
- Broadcast by Seven Network and Fox Cricket

Match 39
15 November 2020
10:20
Scorecard

Perth Scorchers; 8/131 (20 overs)	v	Sydney Thunder; 97 (18.3 overs)
Sophie Devine 45 (44); Hannah Darlington 3/21 (4 overs)		Heather Knight 44 (44); Heather Graham 3/22 (3.3 overs)

Perth Scorchers won by 34 runs
Sydney Showground Stadium
Umpires: Steven Farrell and Claire Polosak
Player of the match: Sophie Devine (Perth Scorchers)

- Perth Scorchers won the toss and elected to bat
- Broadcast by Seven Network and Fox Cricket

Match 44
17 November 2020
19:05 (D/N)
Scorecard

Melbourne Renegades; 7/126 (20 overs)	v	Sydney Thunder; 2/132 (14.3 overs)
Josephine Dooley 46 (44); Hannah Darlington 3/22 (4 overs)		Heather Knight 58* (32); Carly Leeson 1/20 (2 overs)

Sydney Thunder won by 8 wickets (with 33 balls remaining)
Sydney Showground Stadium
Umpires: David Taylor and Eloise Sheridan
Player of the match: Heather Knight (Sydney Thunder)

- Sydney Thunder won the toss and elected to field
- Broadcast by Fox Cricket and Cricket Network
- Venue changed from Blacktown International Sportspark

Match 48
18 November 2020
19:05 (D/N)
Scorecard

Sydney Sixers; 7/147 (20 overs)	v	Sydney Thunder; 8/143 (20 overs)
Dane van Niekerk 45 (39); Sammy-Jo Johnson 3/25 (4 overs)		Phoebe Litchfield 46 (36); Erin Burns 3/28 (4 overs)

Sydney Sixers won by 4 runs
Sydney Showground Stadium
Umpires: David Taylor and Claire Polosak
Player of the match: Erin Burns (Sydney Sixers)

- Sydney Thunder won the toss and elected to field
- Broadcast by Fox Cricket and Cricket Network
- Venue changed from Blacktown International Sportspark

Match 50
21 November 2020
14:30
Scorecard

Adelaide Strikers; 6/133 (20 overs)	v	Sydney Thunder; 5/136 (19.4 overs)
Katie Mack 58 (52); Sammy-Jo Johnson 3/25 (4 overs)		Rachel Trenaman 38 (40); Amanda-Jade Wellington 3/33 (4 overs)

Sydney Thunder won by 5 wickets (with 2 balls remaining)
Drummoyne Oval
Umpires: Andrew Crozier and Sharad Patel
Player of the match: Sammy-Jo Johnson (Sydney Thunder)

- Sydney Thunder won the toss and elected to field
- Broadcast by Cricket Network

Match 53
22 November 2020
09:30
Scorecard

Hobart Hurricanes; 9/115 (20 overs)	v	Sydney Thunder; 4/116 (16.5 overs)
Sasha Moloney 39 (38); Shabnim Ismail 3/10 (4 overs)		Heather Knight 25 (15); Nicola Carey 2/23 (3.5 overs)

Sydney Thunder won by 6 wickets (with 19 balls remaining)
Drummoyne Oval
Umpires: Steven Farrell and Claire Polosak
Player of the match: Shabnim Ismail (Sydney Thunder)

- Sydney Thunder won the toss and elected to field
- Broadcast by Cricket Network
- Sydney Thunder qualified for finals

=== Knockout phase ===
Semi-final 2
26 November 2020
19:10 (D/N)
Scorecard

Sydney Thunder; 6/143 (20 overs)	v	Brisbane Heat; 131 (18.3 overs)
Rachael Haynes 48* (44); Nadine de Klerk 2/11 (3 overs)		Laura Kimmince 37 (17); Hannah Darlington 3/19 (3 overs)

Sydney Thunder won by 12 runs
North Sydney Oval
Umpires: Eloise Sheridan and Tony Wilds
Player of the match: Hannah Darlington (Sydney Thunder)

- Brisbane Heat won the toss and elected to field
- Broadcast by Seven Network and Fox Cricket

Tammy Beaumont launched the Thunder off to a fast start with 27 runs from 20 deliveries, though she was brought undone by a Nicola Hancock slower ball during the last over of the powerplay. Sydney struggled throughout the middle portion of the innings, especially troubled by Brisbane bowlers Nadine de Klerk and Amelia Kerr who collectively managed economical figures of 3/30 from seven overs. Instead of choosing to bowl the 20th over herself, Heat captain Jess Jonassen turned to the medium pace of Delissa Kimmince to close out the innings. Thunder captain Rachael Haynes ensured a respectable total for her team, finishing on 48 not out, as Sydney scored 15 from the final over and set Brisbane a target of 144 for victory.

Thunder spinner Samantha Bates struck early in the run chase, bowling Grace Harris for six, before being hit for three consecutive boundaries in the fourth over by Georgia Redmayne. Soon after playing-and-missing three times in a row to Shabnim Ismail, Redmayne was caught for 25 by Haynes at mid-on against the bowling of Sammy-Jo Johnson. Promoted up the batting order to number three, de Klerk formed a steady partnership with Jonassen, putting on 46 runs together in little more than six overs. When Jonassen was caught-and-bowled for 19 by Hannah Darlington, the Heat required a manageable task of 64 runs from 52 balls with seven wickets in hand. In the following over, de Klerk was run out by a direct hit from Beaumont for a run-a-ball 27. Facing her first delivery, Laura Kimmince survived an extremely close call, playing a flighted Bates delivery on to leg stump—the ball, however, did not connect with enough force to dislodge the bails. Kimmince quickly took advantage of her luck, manically compiling 37 runs from her next 15 balls. Although her aggressive strokeplay led to a plummeting required run rate, she was involved in two running-between-the-wickets mix-ups which led to the run outs of Georgia Voll and Amelia Kerr, keeping the door ajar for a miraculous Sydney comeback.

On the last delivery of the 17th over, with the Brisbane Heat needing just 16 runs to win, Laura Kimmince attempted a high-risk reverse slog against Samantha Bates, only to miss the ball which deflected off her thigh before crashing into the stumps—the bails, this time, were sent airborne. Taking the ball in the 18th over, Hannah Darlington struck twice in two balls to put the Heat in the precarious position of needing 14 runs with only one wicket in hand. Sammy-Jo Johnson completed the Thunder's remarkable resurrection on the third ball of the 19th over, removing Delissa Kimmince for a golden duck via caught-and-bowled, sealing a twelve-run victory and cementing Sydney's spot in Saturday's final. Brisbane's sudden "horror" collapse consisted of losing six wickets for twelve runs, ultimately ending their seven-match winning streak and quest for a three-peat. Media outlets described the match and its unlikely outcome as "chaotic," a "rollercoaster" and "one of the best comebacks in the WBBL's short history." Seven Network commentator Trent Copeland said "when Kimmince was flying you thought the game was gone," and Fox Cricket analyst Molly Strano commented "I don't think I've seen such massive swings in momentum in a game, ever."

Final
28 November 2020
19:10 (D/N)
Scorecard

Melbourne Stars; 9/86 (20 overs)	v	Sydney Thunder; 3/87 (13.4 overs)
Katherine Brunt 22* (27); Sammy-Jo Johnson 2/11 (4 overs)		Heather Knight 26* (19); Tess Flintoff 1/6 (1 over)

Sydney Thunder won by 7 wickets (with 38 balls remaining)
North Sydney Oval
Umpires: Claire Polosak and Eloise Sheridan
Player of the match: Shabnim Ismail (Sydney Thunder)

- Melbourne Stars won the toss and elected to bat
- Broadcast by Seven Network and Fox Cricket
- Sydney Thunder won their second WBBL title

From the first over of the match, the Stars top-order was dominated by a "fiery" spell from Thunder pace bowler Shabnim Ismail, who regularly beat the bat of Elyse Villani and created two catching opportunities against Meg Lanning before dismissing both players for scores of one and 13 respectively. After being dropped on zero by Tammy Beaumont at point, as well as surviving a half-chance which Sammy-Jo Johnson put down at third man, Lanning's seven-ball battle with Ismail came to an end when she edged a seaming delivery through to wicket-keeper Tahlia Wilson at the start of the seventh over. Thunder captain Rachael Haynes was praised for "sensing the moment" by taking the tactical risk of persisting with Ismail, leading to Lanning's wicket which several media outlets described as the defining moment of the match: writing for The Sydney Morning Herald, Tom Decent said "this was the Thunder's night about a quarter of an hour into the contest," while the Australian Associated Press suggested the "Stars' shot at a maiden title was realistically gone inside 37 balls."

Melbourne could not recover from their poor start to post a significant total, slumping further to 5/37 by the halfway mark of the first innings. Annabel Sutherland scored 20 from as many balls but, like Lanning, did not capitalise on two reprieves afforded to her by the Thunder's underwhelming performance in the field. Wickets continued to flow as every Sydney bowler picked up at least one each. Johnson, having opened the bowling with Ismail and proving similarly difficult to score against, finished with match-best figures of 2/11 off four overs which included claiming the wicket of Mignon du Preez via LBW during the powerplay. Katherine Brunt, ending the innings on 22 not out from 27 deliveries, ensured the Stars lasted the allotted 20 overs but their overall score of 9/86 was nevertheless the lowest-ever in a WBBL final.

In reply, Tammy Beaumont (16 off 15) and Rachel Trenaman (23 off 26) steadily opened the Thunder's innings, while experienced campaigners Heather Knight (26 not out) and Rachael Haynes (21 not out) completed the comfortable run chase through a flurry of boundaries. With a lofted drive over long-off that sailed for six, Knight hit the winning runs off the bowling of Alana King in the 14th over, clinching a seven-wicket victory with 38 balls remaining. The Sydney Thunder consequently claimed their second WBBL championship, having also won the inaugural title—only Haynes and Samantha Bates were members of both successful squads, the latter missing the WBBL|01 final due to a broken wrist injury sustained earlier in the tournament. The triumph also marked an individual three-peat for Sammy-Jo Johnson, who won the WBBL|04 and WBBL|05 titles with the Brisbane Heat before moving to the Thunder. Lauren Smith—making her fifth appearance in a WBBL final—earned a third Women's Big Bash League championship as well, having won the WBBL|02 and WBBL|03 titles with the Sydney Sixers.

A major talking point of the match surrounded the decision made at the toss, where Stars captain Meg Lanning sent her own team in to bat first—a noticeable departure from the tactics she employed throughout the season. In fact, it was the first time a Lanning-led WBBL team would opt against chasing since the 2016–17 season. Explaining the shock choice, Lanning said: "We just thought our batting line-up was in really good form, and we thought we'd back ourselves in to get a decent score." Stars coach Trent Woodhill implied the decision was swayed by the Brisbane Heat's collapse under pressure two days earlier: "We also saw what happened with the Heat and the Thunder (semi-final) the other night." The following day, Woodhill added: "It was a sliding door moment. There's no regrets. It was a team decision."

== Statistics and awards ==
- Most runs: Heather Knight – 446 (4th in the league)
- Highest score in an innings: Heather Knight – 83 (39) vs Adelaide Strikers, 31 October
- Most wickets: Sammy-Jo Johnson – 22 (1st in the league)
- Best bowling figures in an innings: Sammy-Jo Johnson – 4/26 (4 overs) vs Melbourne Renegades, 7 November
- Most catches: Phoebe Litchfield – 13 (1st in the league)
- Player of the Match awards:
  - Heather Knight – 3
  - Shabnim Ismail, Sammy-Jo Johnson – 2 each
  - Samantha Bates, Hannah Darlington, Rachael Haynes – 1 each
- WBBL|06 Player of the Tournament: Heather Knight (3rd)
- WBBL|06 Team of the Tournament: Samantha Bates, Hannah Darlington, Heather Knight
- WBBL|06 Young Gun: Rachel Trenaman (week 2 nominee), Phoebe Litchfield (week 5 nominee)
- Alex Blackwell Medal: (Note: Thunder Player of the Tournament) Heather Knight
