= 2020–21 Melbourne Stars WBBL season =

Australian cricket team season

Melbourne Stars
2020–21 season
- Melbourne Stars 2020–21 cap logo
- Coach: Trent Woodhill
- Captain(s): Meg Lanning
- League: WBBL
- Record: 8–3 (1st)
- Finals: Runners-up
- Leading Run Scorer: Meg Lanning – 493
- Leading Wicket Taker: Nat Sciver – 19
- Player of the Season: Nat Sciver

The 2020–21 Melbourne Stars Women's season was the sixth in the team's history. Coached by Trent Woodhill and captained by Meg Lanning, the Stars were runners-up of WBBL|06. Playing the entirety of the tournament in a bio-secure Sydney hub due to the COVID-19 pandemic, they finished the regular season on top of the points table. It was therefore the first time the Stars managed to qualify for the finals—a breakthrough especially notable after ending WBBL|05 in last place.

Despite a dramatic improvement to the team's overall performance from previous seasons, the Stars' campaign nevertheless ended on a sour note: In the championship decider, held at North Sydney Oval, they were dealt a "thumping" upset defeat at the hands of the Sydney Thunder, losing by seven wickets with 38 balls remaining.

== Squad ==
Each 2020–21 squad is to be made up of 15 active players. Teams can sign up to five 'marquee players', with a maximum of three of those from overseas. Marquees are classed as any overseas player, or a local player who holds a Cricket Australia national contract at the start of the WBBL|06 signing period.

Personnel changes made ahead of the season included:

- Former Australian player and Stars captain Kristen Beams retired from cricket at the end of WBBL|05.
- Head coach David Hemp parted ways with the Stars and was initially replaced by Leah Poulton. However, a month after her appointment, Poulton resigned from the position to undertake the role of Head of Female Cricket at Cricket NSW. The Stars then announced Trent Woodhill would take over the top coaching job.
- Meg Lanning returned to the Stars, where she played the first two WBBL seasons before a three-year stint with the Perth Scorchers. Lanning also resumed her role as captain of the team, taking over from Elyse Villani.
- South Africa marquee Lizelle Lee signed with the Melbourne Renegades, bringing her three-year stay at the Stars to an end.
- England marquee Nat Sciver returned to the Stars, where she played the first two WBBL seasons before moving to the Perth Scorchers.
- England marquee Katherine Brunt signed with the Stars, marking her return to the league after playing in the first three WBBL seasons with the Perth Scorchers.
- Nicola Hancock departed the Stars, signing with the Brisbane Heat.
- Angela Reakes returned to the Sydney Sixers, where she played the first three WBBL seasons before a two-year stint with the Stars.
- Madeline Penna signed with the Adelaide Strikers, having played with the Stars in WBBL|05 as an injury replacement.
- Bhavisha Devchand signed with the Stars, having played with the Perth Scorchers in WBBL|04 as an injury replacement.

Changes made during the season included:

- New Zealand marquee Rosemary Mair was signed from the reserve player pool, replacing Katherine Brunt (managed) on 25 October and 17 November.
- Anna Lanning was signed from the reserve player pool, replacing Georgia Gall (finger) for three games from 10 to 22 November.

The table below lists the Stars players and their key stats (including runs scored, batting strike rate, wickets taken, economy rate, catches and stumpings) for the season.

No.	Name	Nat.	Birth date	Batting style	Bowling style	G	R	SR	W	E	C	S	Notes
Batters
00	Mignon du Preez	(South Africa)	13 June 1989	Right-handed	–	15	380	122.58	–	–	1	–	Overseas marquee
12	Anna Lanning	(Australia)	25 March 1994	Right-handed	Right-arm medium	3	8	88.88	–	–	1	–	Local replacement player
7	Meg Lanning	(Australia)	25 March 1992	Right-handed	Right-arm medium	15	493	127.72	–	–	7	–	Captain, Australian marquee
2	Elyse Villani	(Australia)	6 October 1989	Right-handed	Right-arm medium	15	360	120.80	–	–	3	–	
All-rounders
24	Lucy Cripps	(Australia)	6 December 2001	Right-handed	Right-arm medium	1	–	–	–	–	0	–	
16	Georgia Gall	(Australia)	30 July 2004	Left-handed	Left-arm medium fast	–	–	–	–	–	–	–	
76	Erin Osborne	(Australia)	27 June 1989	Right-handed	Right-arm off spin	10	32	88.88	2	5.72	2	–	
39	Nat Sciver	(England)	20 August 1992	Right-handed	Right-arm medium	14	252	122.92	19	6.71	8	–	Overseas marquee
3	Annabel Sutherland	(Australia)	12 October 2001	Right-handed	Right-arm medium fast	15	190	113.77	3	7.97	6	–	Australian marquee
Wicket-keeper
4	Nicole Faltum	(Australia)	17 January 2000	Right-handed	–	15	27	100.00	–	–	6	2	
Bowlers
26	Katherine Brunt	(England)	2 July 1985	Right-handed	Right-arm medium fast	11	49	108.88	8	6.36	3	–	Overseas marquee
6	Sophie Day	(Australia)	2 September 1998	Left-handed	Left-arm orthodox	15	5	166.66	11	6.66	0	–	
37	Bhavisha Devchand	(Australia)	24 December 1992	Right-handed	Right-arm leg spin	–	–	–	–	–	–	–	
9	Holly Ferling	(Australia)	22 December 1995	Right-handed	Right-arm medium fast	8	0	–	6	7.42	2	–	
25	Tess Flintoff	(Australia)	31 March 2003	Right-handed	Right-arm medium	14	9	45.00	11	8.03	1	–	
13	Alana King	(Australia)	22 November 1995	Right-handed	Right-arm leg spin	12	62	187.87	16	6.00	3	–	
98	Rosemary Mair	(New Zealand)	7 November 1998	Right-handed	Right-arm medium fast	2	–	–	3	7.50	0	–	Overseas marquee (replacement)

== Ladder ==
Pos	Team	Pld	W	L	NR	Pts	NRR
1	Melbourne Stars (RU)	14	8	3	3	19	0.965
2	Brisbane Heat	14	8	4	2	18	0.543
3	Sydney Thunder (C)	14	7	5	2	16	0.344
4	Perth Scorchers	14	6	6	2	14	0.355
5	Sydney Sixers	14	6	6	2	14	−0.084
6	Adelaide Strikers	14	6	7	1	13	0.135
7	Melbourne Renegades	14	4	8	2	10	−1.008
8	Hobart Hurricanes	14	3	9	2	8	−1.143

- The top 4 teams advance to the play-off phase

== Fixtures ==
All times are local time

=== Regular season ===
Match 4
25 October 2020
14:30
Scorecard

Melbourne Stars; 4/127 (17 overs)	v	Melbourne Renegades
Meg Lanning 51* (50); Carly Leeson 2/28 (3 overs)

No result
Hurstville Oval
Umpires: Roberto Howard and Jerry Matibiri

- Melbourne Renegades won the toss and elected to field
- No further play was possible due to rain
- Broadcast by Cricket Network

Match 5
26 October 2020
09:30
Scorecard

Sydney Thunder; 2/13 (4 overs)	v	Melbourne Stars
Heather Knight 4* (6); Nat Sciver 1/3 (1 over)

No result
North Sydney Oval
Umpires: Nathan Robert Johnstone and Muhammad Qureshi

- Melbourne Stars won the toss and elected to field
- No further play was possible due to rain
- Broadcast by Cricket Network

Match 12
31 October 2020
19:05 (D/N)
Scorecard

Sydney Sixers	v	Melbourne Stars

Match abandoned
Sydney Showground Stadium
Umpires: Muhammad Qureshi and Simon Lightbody

- No toss
- No play was possible due to rain
- Broadcast by Seven Network and Fox Cricket

Match 16
1 November 2020
14:30
Scorecard

Hobart Hurricanes; 9/89 (19 overs)	v	Melbourne Stars; 2/93 (11.2 overs)
Nicola Carey 26* (37); Katherine Brunt 3/17 (4 overs)		Elyse Villani 51* (32); Brooke Hepburn 1/6 (1 over)

Melbourne Stars won by 8 wickets (with 46 balls remaining)
Drummoyne Oval
Umpires: Nathan Johnstone and Stephen Dionysius
Player of the match: Katherine Brunt (Melbourne Stars)

- Melbourne Stars won the toss and elected to field
- Match reduced to 19 overs per side due to rain delay
- Broadcast by Cricket Network

Match 18
3 November 2020
19:05 (D/N)
Scorecard

Adelaide Strikers; 6/154 (20 overs)	v	Melbourne Stars; 3/159 (19.4 overs)
Laura Wolvaardt 68 (50); Alana King 2/23 (4 overs)		Meg Lanning 69 (58); Madeline Penna 2/11 (2 overs)

Melbourne Stars won by 7 wickets (with 2 balls remaining)
Blacktown International Sportspark
Umpires: David Taylor and Simon Lightbody
Player of the match: Meg Lanning (Melbourne Stars)

- Melbourne Stars won the toss and elected to field
- Broadcast by Fox Cricket and Cricket Network

Match 24
7 November 2020
19:05 (D/N)
Scorecard

Perth Scorchers; 118 (20 overs)	v	Melbourne Stars; 2/120 (15.2 overs)
Heather Graham 29 (30); Alana King 2/16 (4 overs)		Meg Lanning 51* (38); Piepa Cleary 1/13 (2 overs)

Melbourne Stars won by 8 wickets (with 28 balls remaining)
North Sydney Oval
Umpires: Simon Lightbody and Stephen Dionysius
Player of the match: Nat Sciver (Melbourne Stars)

- Melbourne Stars won the toss and elected to field
- Broadcast by Seven Network and Fox Cricket

Match 27
8 November 2020
13:45
Scorecard

Melbourne Stars; 9/177 (20 overs)	v	Brisbane Heat; 8/154 (20 overs)
Meg Lanning 54 (25); Amelia Kerr 3/35 (4 overs)		Grace Harris 81* (52); Alana King 2/22 (4 overs)

Melbourne Stars won by 23 runs
North Sydney Oval
Umpires: Tony Wilds and Bede Sajowitz
Player of the match: Meg Lanning (Melbourne Stars)

- Brisbane Heat won the toss and elected to field
- Broadcast by Seven Network and Fox Cricket

Match 29
10 November 2020
14:30
Scorecard

Adelaide Strikers; 7/140 (20 overs)	v	Melbourne Stars; 5/144 (19.3 overs)
Laura Wolvaardt 46 (40); Nat Sciver 4/29 (4 overs)		Mignon du Preez 61 (51); Sarah Coyte 2/16 (4 overs)

Melbourne Stars won by 5 wickets (with 3 balls remaining)
Blacktown International Sportspark
Umpires: Greg Davidson and Andrew Crozier
Player of the match: Nat Sciver (Melbourne Stars)

- Melbourne Stars won the toss and elected to field
- Broadcast by Fox Cricket and Cricket Network

Match 36
14 November 2020
19:05 (D/N)
Scorecard

Sydney Thunder; 5/131 (20 overs)	v	Melbourne Stars; 2/135 (16.5 overs)
Rachael Haynes 51 (49); Katherine Brunt 2/19 (3 overs)		Mignon du Preez 57* (37); Hannah Darlington 1/25 (3 overs)

Melbourne Stars won by 8 wickets (with 19 balls remaining)
Sydney Showground Stadium
Umpires: Andrew Crozier and Tony Wilds
Player of the match: Nat Sciver (Melbourne Stars)

- Melbourne Stars won the toss and elected to field
- Broadcast by Seven Network and Fox Cricket

Match 40
15 November 2020
13:45
Scorecard

Melbourne Stars; 8/165 (20 overs)	v	Melbourne Renegades; 7/165 (20 overs)
Meg Lanning 41 (29); Ella Hayward 4/16 (4 overs)		Courtney Webb 54* (33); Holly Ferling 2/21 (3 overs)

Match tied
Melbourne Renegades won the Super Over
Sydney Showground Stadium
Umpires: Greg Davidson and Sharad Patel
Player of the match: Courtney Webb (Melbourne Renegades)

- Melbourne Renegades won the toss and elected to field
- Broadcast by Seven Network and Fox Cricket
- Venue changed from Drummoyne Oval
- Super Over: Melbourne Renegades 0/16 (1 over), Melbourne Stars 0/12 (1 over)
- Molly Strano became the first player to take 100 career wickets in the WBBL

Match 42
17 November 2020
14:30
Scorecard

Melbourne Stars; 8/149 (20 overs)	v	Perth Scorchers; 8/143 (20 overs)
Meg Lanning 57 (39); Nicole Bolton 3/25 (4 overs)		Beth Mooney 45 (30); Sophie Day 3/16 (4 overs)

Melbourne Stars won by 6 runs
Hurstville Oval
Umpires: Claire Polosak and Andrew Crozier
Player of the match: Meg Lanning (Melbourne Stars)

- Perth Scorchers won the toss and elected to field
- Broadcast by Cricket Network
- Melbourne Stars qualified for finals

Match 46
18 November 2020
14:30
Scorecard

Melbourne Stars; 3/159 (20 overs)	v	Hobart Hurricanes; 8/120 (20 overs)
Annabel Sutherland 72 (51); Belinda Vakarewa 2/28 (4 overs)		Rachel Priest 24 (18); Katherine Brunt 2/12 (4 overs)

Melbourne Stars won by 39 runs
Hurstville Oval
Umpires: Tony Wilds and Sharad Patel
Player of the match: Annabel Sutherland (Melbourne Stars)

- Hobart Hurricanes won the toss and elected to field
- Broadcast by Cricket Network

Match 49
21 November 2020
09:30
Scorecard

Melbourne Stars; 5/151 (20 overs)	v	Brisbane Heat; 7/152 (19.2 overs)
Mignon du Preez 51 (38); Grace Harris 2/8 (2 overs)		Georgia Redmayne 37 (32); Tess Flintoff 3/13 (3 overs)

Brisbane Heat won by 3 wickets (with 4 balls remaining)
Drummoyne Oval
Umpires: Steven Farrell and Greg Davidson
Player of the match: Laura Kimmince (Brisbane Heat)

- Brisbane Heat won the toss and elected to field
- Broadcast by Cricket Network

Match 55
22 November 2020
13:45
Scorecard

Melbourne Stars; 4/178 (19 overs)	v	Sydney Sixers; 5/184 (18.4 overs)
Meg Lanning 77 (59); Marizanne Kapp 3/34 (4 overs)		Alyssa Healy 111 (52); Tess Flintoff 3/32 (3 overs)

Sydney Sixers won by 5 wickets (DLS method) (with 2 balls remaining)
North Sydney Oval
Umpires: Eloise Sheridan and Tony Wilds
Player of the match: Alyssa Healy (Sydney Sixers)

- Sydney Sixers won the toss and elected to field
- Match reduced to 19 overs per side due to rain delay
- Sydney Sixers were set a revised target of 184 from 19 overs due to rain delay
- Sydney Sixers equalled the record for the highest successful run chase in WBBL history
- Sydney Sixers were eliminated from finals contention
- Perth Scorchers qualified for finals
- Broadcast by Seven Network and Fox Cricket
- Former Australian player Sarah Aley made her last WBBL appearance

=== Knockout phase ===
Semi-final 1
25 November 2020
19:10 (D/N)
Scorecard

Perth Scorchers; 8/125 (20 overs)	v	Melbourne Stars; 3/127 (16.2 overs)
Nicole Bolton 32 (25); Alana King 3/16 (4 overs)		Nat Sciver 47* (45); Sophie Devine 1/17 (2.2 overs)

Melbourne Stars won by 7 wickets (with 22 balls remaining)
North Sydney Oval
Umpires: Troy Penman and Claire Polosak
Player of the match: Alana King (Melbourne Stars)

- Melbourne Stars won the toss and elected to field
- Broadcast by Seven Network and Fox Cricket

Final
28 November 2020
19:10 (D/N)
Scorecard

Melbourne Stars; 9/86 (20 overs)	v	Sydney Thunder; 3/87 (13.4 overs)
Katherine Brunt 22* (27); Sammy-Jo Johnson 2/11 (4 overs)		Heather Knight 26* (19); Tess Flintoff 1/6 (1 over)

Sydney Thunder won by 7 wickets (with 38 balls remaining)
North Sydney Oval
Umpires: Claire Polosak and Eloise Sheridan
Player of the match: Shabnim Ismail (Sydney Thunder)

- Melbourne Stars won the toss and elected to bat
- Broadcast by Seven Network and Fox Cricket
- Sydney Thunder won their second WBBL title

From the first over of the match, the Melbourne Stars top-order was dominated by a "fiery" spell from Sydney Thunder pace bowler Shabnim Ismail, who regularly beat the bat of Elyse Villani and created two catching opportunities against Meg Lanning before dismissing both players for scores of one and 13 respectively. After being dropped on zero by Tammy Beaumont at point, as well as surviving a half-chance which Sammy-Jo Johnson put down at third man, Lanning's seven-ball battle with Ismail came to an end when she edged a seaming delivery through to wicket-keeper Tahlia Wilson at the start of the seventh over. Thunder captain Rachael Haynes was praised for "sensing the moment" by taking the tactical risk of persisting with Ismail, leading to Lanning's wicket which several media outlets described as the defining moment of the match: writing for The Sydney Morning Herald, Tom Decent said "this was the Thunder's night about a quarter of an hour into the contest," while the Australian Associated Press suggested the "Stars' shot at a maiden title was realistically gone inside 37 balls."

Melbourne could not recover from their poor start to post a significant total, slumping further to 5/37 by the halfway mark of the first innings. Annabel Sutherland scored 20 from as many balls but, like Lanning, did not capitalise on two reprieves afforded to her by the Thunder's underwhelming performance in the field. Wickets continued to flow as every Sydney bowler picked up at least one each. Johnson, having opened the bowling with Ismail and proving similarly difficult to score against, finished with match-best figures of 2/11 off four overs which included claiming the wicket of Mignon du Preez via LBW during the powerplay. Katherine Brunt, ending the innings on 22 not out from 27 deliveries, ensured the Stars lasted the allotted 20 overs but their overall score of 9/86 was nevertheless the lowest-ever in a WBBL final.

In reply, Tammy Beaumont (16 off 15) and Rachel Trenaman (23 off 26) steadily opened the Thunder's innings, while experienced campaigners Heather Knight (26 not out) and Rachael Haynes (21 not out) completed the comfortable run chase through a flurry of boundaries. With a lofted drive over long-off that sailed for six, Knight hit the winning runs off the bowling of Alana King in the 14th over, clinching a seven-wicket victory with 38 balls remaining. The Sydney Thunder consequently claimed their second WBBL championship, having also won the inaugural title—only Haynes and Samantha Bates were members of both successful squads, the latter missing the WBBL|01 final due to a broken wrist injury sustained earlier in the tournament. The triumph also marked an individual three-peat for Sammy-Jo Johnson, who won the WBBL|04 and WBBL|05 titles with the Brisbane Heat before moving to the Thunder. Lauren Smith—making her fifth appearance in a WBBL final—earned a third Women's Big Bash League championship as well, having won the WBBL|02 and WBBL|03 titles with the Sydney Sixers.

A major talking point of the match surrounded the decision made by the Melbourne Stars at the bat flip. Stars captain Meg Lanning sent her own team in to bat first, a noticeable departure from the tactics she employed throughout the season. In fact, it was the first time a Lanning-led WBBL team would opt against chasing since the 2016–17 season. Explaining the shock choice, Lanning said: "We just thought our batting line-up was in really good form, and we thought we'd back ourselves in to get a decent score." Stars coach Trent Woodhill implied the decision was swayed by the Brisbane Heat's collapse under pressure two days earlier: "We also saw what happened with the Heat and the Thunder (semi-final) the other night." The following day, Woodhill added: "It was a sliding door moment. There's no regrets. It was a team decision."

== Statistics and awards ==
- Most runs: Meg Lanning – 493 (2nd in the league)
- Highest score in an innings: Meg Lanning – 77 (59) vs Sydney Sixers, 22 November
- Most wickets: Nat Sciver – 19 (equal 2nd in the league)
- Best bowling figures in an innings: Nat Sciver – 4/29 (4 overs) vs Adelaide Strikers, 10 November
- Most catches: Nat Sciver – 8 (equal 3rd in the league)
- Player of the Match awards:
  - Meg Lanning, Nat Sciver – 3 each
  - Katherine Brunt, Alana King, Annabel Sutherland – 1 each
- WBBL|06 Player of the Tournament: Meg Lanning (2nd), Mignon du Preez (equal 5th), Nat Sciver (equal 5th)
- WBBL|06 Team of the Tournament: Alana King, Meg Lanning, Nat Sciver
- Stars Player of the Season: Nat Sciver
