= 2020–21 Women's Big Bash League season =

Cricket tournament

2020–21 Women's Big Bash League
- Dates: 25 October 2020 – 28 November 2020
- Administrator: Cricket Australia
- Cricket format: Twenty20
- Tournament format(s): Double round robin and knockout finals
- Champions: Sydney Thunder (2nd title)
- Runners-up: Melbourne Stars
- Participants: 8
- Matches: 59
- Player of the series: Sophie Devine (PRS)
- Most runs: Beth Mooney (PRS) – 551
- Most wickets: Sammy-Jo Johnson (SYT) – 22
- Official website: WBBL

The 2020–21 Women's Big Bash League season or WBBL|06 was the sixth season of the Women's Big Bash League (WBBL), the semi-professional women's Twenty20 domestic cricket competition in Australia. The tournament took place from 25 October to 28 November 2020. It was played entirely in Sydney due to ongoing state border restrictions brought about by the COVID-19 pandemic.

The Brisbane Heat entered the season as double defending champions, having won back-to-back titles in WBBL|04 and WBBL|05. The Heat finished the regular season with seven-straight wins but suffered an "epic meltdown" in a twelve-run semi-final loss against the Sydney Thunder, ending their hunt for a three-peat.

In the final, held at North Sydney Oval, the Sydney Thunder defeated the Melbourne Stars by seven wickets with 38 balls remaining to win their second Women's Big Bash League title. Shabnim Ismail was awarded Player of the Match after taking key early wickets against the top-qualifying Stars team, leading to a "thumping" victory for the Thunder.

Sophie Devine was named Player of the Tournament in her first season with the Perth Scorchers, earning the same award she won in WBBL|05 while playing for the Adelaide Strikers.

== Teams ==
Each squad was made up of 15 active players. Teams could sign up to five 'marquee players', with a maximum of three of those from overseas. Marquees were classed as any overseas player, or a local player who holds a Cricket Australia national contract at the start of the WBBL signing period.

The table below lists each team's marquee players and other key details for the season.

| Team | Coach | Captain | Australian representatives (Note: Only includes players who debuted for Australia before the tournament) | Overseas players |
|---|---|---|---|---|
| Adelaide Strikers | Luke Williams | Suzie Bates (Note: Megan Schutt stood in as acting captain for 13 games) | Tahlia McGrath; Megan Schutt; Sarah Coyte (Note: Player did not hold a Cricket Australia national contract at the beginning of the WBBL|06 signing period); Amanda-Jade Wellington | Suzie Bates; Stafanie Taylor; Laura Wolvaardt; Katie Perkins (Note: Replacement player) |
| Brisbane Heat | Ashley Noffke | Jess Jonassen | Jess Jonassen; Delissa Kimmince; Grace Harris | Nadine de Klerk; Maddy Green; Amelia Kerr |
| Hobart Hurricanes | Salliann Briggs | Corinne Hall | Nicola Carey; Tayla Vlaeminck (Note: Unavailable for the season); Naomi Stalenberg; Belinda Vakarewa | Hayley Matthews; Rachel Priest; Chloe Tryon; Hayley Jensen |
| Melbourne Renegades | Lachlan Stevens | Amy Satterthwaite | Sophie Molineux; Georgia Wareham; Jess Duffin; Molly Strano | Lizelle Lee; Amy Satterthwaite; Lea Tahuhu; Rosemary Mair |
| Melbourne Stars | Trent Woodhill | Meg Lanning | Meg Lanning; Annabel Sutherland; Holly Ferling; Erin Osborne; Elyse Villani | Katherine Brunt; Mignon du Preez; Nat Sciver; Rosemary Mair |
| Perth Scorchers | Shelley Nitschke | Sophie Devine (Note: Beth Mooney stood in as acting captain for two games) | Beth Mooney; Nicole Bolton; Heather Graham | Sophie Devine; Sarah Glenn; Amy Jones; Lauren Down |
| Sydney Sixers | Ben Sawyer | Ellyse Perry | Ashleigh Gardner; Alyssa Healy; Ellyse Perry; Sarah Aley; Erin Burns; Lauren Cheatle | Marizanne Kapp; Dane van Niekerk |
| Sydney Thunder | Trevor Griffin | Rachael Haynes | Rachael Haynes | Tammy Beaumont; Shabnim Ismail; Heather Knight |

=== Personnel changes ===
==== Local players ====
The table below lists local player movements made ahead of the season.

| Player | Departed | → | Joined | Notes | Ref(s) |
|---|---|---|---|---|---|
| Meg Lanning | Perth Scorchers | → | Melbourne Stars | Australian marquee; Outgoing captain (14–10 win–loss record); Returning to the Melbourne Stars | |
| Beth Mooney | Brisbane Heat | → | Perth Scorchers | Australian marquee | |
| Sammy-Jo Johnson | Brisbane Heat | → | Sydney Thunder | | |
| Erin Fazackerley | Hobart Hurricanes | → | Melbourne Renegades | | |
| Lauren Smith | Sydney Sixers | → | Sydney Thunder | | |
| Georgia Redmayne | Perth Scorchers | → | Brisbane Heat | Third WBBL team (previously played for the Hobart Hurricanes) | |
| Nicola Hancock | Melbourne Stars | → | Brisbane Heat | Fourth WBBL team (previously played for the Melbourne Renegades and Hobart Hurricanes) | |
| Angela Reakes | Melbourne Stars | → | Sydney Sixers | Returning to the Sydney Sixers | |
| Madeline Penna | Melbourne Stars | → | Adelaide Strikers | Replacement player in WBBL|05 | |
| Lisa Griffith | Sydney Thunder | → | Sydney Sixers | | |
| Bhavisha Devchand | – | → | Melbourne Stars | Previously a replacement player for the Perth Scorchers | |
| Naomi Stalenberg | Sydney Thunder | → | Hobart Hurricanes | | |
| Erica Kershaw | Melbourne Renegades | → | Hobart Hurricanes | | |
| Chloe Rafferty | Melbourne Stars | → | Hobart Hurricanes | Replacement player in WBBL|05 | |
| Kirby Short | Brisbane Heat | → | – | Retired; Outgoing captain (34–19 (Note: Includes one win via Super Over) win–loss record) | |
| Kristen Beams | Melbourne Stars | → | – | Retired | |
| Alex Blackwell | Sydney Thunder | → | – | Retired | |
| Rene Farrell | Sydney Thunder | → | – | Retired | |

==== Overseas players ====
The table below lists overseas player movements made ahead of the season.

| Player | Departed | → | Joined | Notes | Ref(s) |
|---|---|---|---|---|---|
| Rachel Priest | Sydney Thunder | → | Hobart Hurricanes | Third WBBL team (previously played for the Melbourne Renegades) | |
| Lizelle Lee | Melbourne Stars | → | Melbourne Renegades | | |
| Sophie Devine | Adelaide Strikers | → | Perth Scorchers | | |
| Laura Wolvaardt | – | → | Adelaide Strikers | Previously played for the Brisbane Heat | |
| Amy Satterthwaite | – | → | Melbourne Renegades | Returning from maternity leave | |
| Nadine de Klerk | – | → | Brisbane Heat | | |
| Nat Sciver | Perth Scorchers | → | Melbourne Stars | Returning to the Melbourne Stars | |
| Katherine Brunt | – | → | Melbourne Stars | Previously played for the Perth Scorchers | |
| Sarah Glenn | – | → | Perth Scorchers | | |
| Heather Knight | Hobart Hurricanes | → | Sydney Thunder | | |
| Tammy Beaumont | Melbourne Renegades | → | Sydney Thunder | Third WBBL team (previously played for the Adelaide Strikers) | |
| Hayley Jensen | – | → | Hobart Hurricanes | Fourth WBBL team (previously played for the Melbourne Stars, Melbourne Renegades and Perth Scorchers) | |
| Lauren Winfield | Adelaide Strikers | → | – | Replacement player in WBBL|05 | |
| Fran Wilson | Hobart Hurricanes | → | – | | |
| Danielle Wyatt | Melbourne Renegades | → | – | | |
| Chamari Atapattu | Melbourne Renegades | → | – | Replacement player in WBBL|05 | |
| Katey Martin | Melbourne Stars | → | – | | |
| Kim Garth | Perth Scorchers | → | – | | |
| Hollie Armitage | Sydney Sixers | → | – | Replacement player in WBBL|05 | |
| Nida Dar | Sydney Thunder | → | – | | |

==== Replacement players ====
Designed to overcome bio-security rules that prevent fresh players being brought into the hub, the replacement player pool includes four New Zealanders and 16 locals, all living inside the WBBL Village. Each player trains with a host club but can be signed by any team, and they are released back into the pool once the original replaced player returns from their relevant injury or availability issue. It is therefore possible that a player from the replacement pool finds themselves lining up for multiple teams throughout the season.

Replacement players to appear in one game or more during the season included:

- New Zealand's Rosemary Mair played for the Melbourne Stars on 25 October and 17 November, replacing Katherine Brunt (managed). Mair also played five games for the Melbourne Renegades from 3–14 November, replacing Lea Tahuhu (side strain).
- New Zealand's Katie Perkins played for the Adelaide Strikers on 26 October, replacing Suzie Bates (shoulder).
- Gabby Sutcliffe played for the Sydney Thunder on 1 November, replacing Hannah Darlington (ankle/shin).
- New Zealand's Lauren Down played seven matches for the Perth Scorchers from 1–11 November, replacing Amy Jones (quad injury).
- Anna Lanning played three games for the Melbourne Stars from 10 to 22 November, replacing Georgia Gall (finger).
- Amy Yates played six games for the Melbourne Renegades from 14 to 22 November, replacing Georgia Wareham (shin).
- Rebecca Carter played one game for the Melbourne Renegades on 22 November, replacing Maitlan Brown (hamstring).

==== Leadership ====
Coaching changes made ahead of the season included:

- Shelley Nitschke was appointed head coach of the Perth Scorchers, replacing Lisa Keightley who departed to take on the role as coach of England.
- As part of Cricket Victoria's cost-cutting organisational restructure, the Melbourne Renegades did not renew the contract of head coach Tim Coyle despite achieving two consecutive finals appearances. Lachlan Stevens, who coached the Renegades in their first two seasons, was announced as Coyle's replacement.
- David Hemp parted ways with the Melbourne Stars and was initially replaced as head coach by Leah Poulton. However, a month after her appointment, Poulton resigned from the position to undertake the role of Head of Female Cricket at Cricket NSW. The Stars then announced Trent Woodhill would take over the top coaching job.

Captaincy changes made ahead of the season included:

- Jess Jonassen was appointed captain of the Brisbane Heat, replacing Kirby Short (34–19 win–loss record) who retired from cricket at the end of WBBL|05.
- The Perth Scorchers appointed new recruit Sophie Devine as captain, replacing Meg Lanning (14–10).
- Amy Satterthwaite resumed her role as captain of the Melbourne Renegades, after Jess Duffin (7–7) stepped into the position for a season.
- Meg Lanning resumed her role as captain of the Melbourne Stars, taking over from Elyse Villani (2–12).

Captaincy changes made during the season included:

- Megan Schutt stood in as acting captain of the Adelaide Strikers for 13 games, replacing Suzie Bates who was sidelined with a shoulder injury.
- Beth Mooney stood in as acting captain of the Perth Scorchers for two games, replacing Sophie Devine who was sidelined with a back injury.

== Standings ==
=== Points table ===
| Pos | Team | Pld | W | L | NR | Pts | NRR |
|---|---|---|---|---|---|---|---|
| 1 | Melbourne Stars (RU) | 14 | 8 | 3 | 3 | 19 | 0.965 |
| 2 | Brisbane Heat | 14 | 8 | 4 | 2 | 18 | 0.543 |
| 3 | Sydney Thunder (C) | 14 | 7 | 5 | 2 | 16 | 0.344 |
| 4 | Perth Scorchers | 14 | 6 | 6 | 2 | 14 | 0.355 |
| 5 | Sydney Sixers | 14 | 6 | 6 | 2 | 14 | −0.084 |
| 6 | Adelaide Strikers | 14 | 6 | 7 | 1 | 13 | 0.135 |
| 7 | Melbourne Renegades | 14 | 4 | 8 | 2 | 10 | −1.008 |
| 8 | Hobart Hurricanes | 14 | 3 | 9 | 2 | 8 | −1.143 |

- The top 4 teams advance to the play-off phase

=== Win–loss table ===
Below is a summary of results for each team's fourteen regular season matches, plus finals where applicable, in chronological order. A team's opponent for any given match is listed above the margin of victory/defeat.

| Team | 1 | 2 | 3 | 4 | 5 | 6 | 7 | 8 | 9 | 10 | 11 | 12 | 13 | 14 | SF | F | Pos. |
|---|---|---|---|---|---|---|---|---|---|---|---|---|---|---|---|---|---|
| Adelaide Strikers (ADS) | HBH; 8 wkts | SYS; 9 wkts | SYT; 58 runs | PRS; N/R | MLS; 7 wkts | BRH; 18 runs | MLR; 6 runs | MLS; 5 wkts | BRH; 14 runs | SYS; 14 runs | HBH; 64 runs | MLR; 7 wkts | SYT; 5 wkts | PRS; 3 runs | X | X | 6th |
| Brisbane Heat (BRH) | PRS; 7 wkts | MLR; N/R | HBH; N/R | SYT; 14 runs | SYS; 24 runs | ADS; 18 runs | MLS; 23 runs | SYT; 8 wkts | ADS; 14 runs | HBH; 10 wkts | SYS; 3 wkts | PRS; 4 wkts | MLS; 3 wkts | MLR; 43 runs | SYT; 12 runs | X | 2nd (SF) |
| Hobart Hurricanes (HBH) | ADS; 8 wkts | PRS; N/R | BRH; N/R | MLS; 8 wkts | MLR; 9 wkts | SYS; 9 runs | SYT; 1 run | MLR; 9 runs | SYS; 9 wkts | BRH; 10 wkts | ADS; 64 runs | MLS; 39 runs | PRS; 10 wkts | SYT; 6 wkts | X | X | 8th |
| Melbourne Renegades (MLR) | MLS; N/R | BRH; N/R | PRS; 18 runs | SYS; 8 wkts | HBH; 9 wkts | SYT; 2 runs | ADS; 6 runs | HBH; 9 runs | PRS; 9 wkts | MLS; S/O | SYT; 8 wkts | ADS; 7 wkts | SYS; 6 wkts | BRH; 43 runs | X | X | 7th |
| Melbourne Stars (MLS) | MLR; N/R | SYT; N/R | SYS; N/R | HBH; 8 wkts | ADS; 7 wkts | PRS; 8 wkts | BRH; 23 runs | ADS; 5 wkts | SYT; 8 wkts | MLR; S/O | PRS; 6 runs | HBH; 39 runs | BRH; 3 wkts | SYS; 5 wkts | PRS; 7 wkts | SYT; 7 wkts | 1st (RU) |
| Perth Scorchers (PRS) | BRH; 7 wkts | HBH; N/R | MLR; 18 runs | ADS; N/R | SYT; 24 runs | MLS; 8 wkts | SYS; 36 runs | SYS; 5 wkts | MLR; 9 wkts | SYT; 34 runs | MLS; 6 runs | BRH; 4 wkts | HBH; 10 wkts | ADS; 3 runs | MLS; 7 wkts | X | 4th (SF) |
| Sydney Sixers (SYS) | SYT; N/R | ADS; 9 wkts | MLS; N/R | MLR; 8 wkts | BRH; 24 runs | HBH; 9 runs | PRS; 36 runs | PRS; 5 wkts | HBH; 9 wkts | ADS; 14 runs | BRH; 3 wkts | SYT; 4 runs | MLR; 6 wkts | MLS; 5 wkts | X | X | 5th |
| Sydney Thunder (SYT) | SYS; N/R | MLS; N/R | ADS; 58 runs | BRH; 14 runs | PRS; 24 runs | MLR; 2 runs | HBH; 1 run | BRH; 8 wkts | MLS; 8 wkts | PRS; 34 runs | MLR; 8 wkts | SYS; 4 runs | ADS; 5 wkts | HBH; 6 wkts | BRH; 12 runs | MLS; 7 wkts | 3rd (C) |

| Team's results→ | Won | Tied | Lost | N/R |

Last updated: 28 November 2020

== Fixtures ==
Cricket Australia (CA) released the original fixture for WBBL|06 on 15 July 2020 with the stipulation that it was subject to any change that may be required as a result of the COVID-19 pandemic. On 4 September, CA announced changes to the schedule which would see the tournament begin a week later, on October 25, and be played entirely in Sydney as a result of ongoing uncertainty surrounding state border restrictions.

On 25 September, CA released the revised schedule, confirming the five venues to be used for all regular season matches: North Sydney Oval, Hurstville Oval, Drummoyne Oval, Sydney Showground Stadium and Blacktown International Sportspark. CA also revealed it would create a "WBBL Village" in Sydney Olympic Park to accommodate players and staff from all eight teams for the duration of the tournament. As per all previous seasons, WBBL|06 consisted of a 56-match double round-robin, followed by a finals series featuring the top four qualifiers.

On 16 October, admission tickets were released to the public for all weekend games at North Sydney Oval and Sydney Showground Stadium, as well as Wednesday games at Blacktown International Sportspark. All matches held at Drummoyne Oval and Hurstville Oval would remain closed to the general public. CA also announced several minor scheduling changes to five fixtures: the opening day clash between the Renegades and the Stars swapped times and venues with the encounter between the Scorchers and the Heat; the times and venues of the 15 November Renegades–Stars and Hurricanes–Heat matches were altered; the start time of the Thunder–Scorchers match on 15 November was brought forward.

On 28 October, four additional changes to the fixture were announced. The Sixers–Heat and Thunder–Renegades games on 17 November, as well as the Strikers–Renegades and Thunder–Sixers games on 18 November, were moved to Sydney Showground Stadium, allowing the touring Indian men's team to utilise a bio-secure training environment at Blacktown International Sportspark. The rescheduled matches on 18 November would remain open to the public.

On 11 November, Cricket Australia announced the finals series would be played in prime time TV slots for the first occasion in the league's history. The semi-finals (on 25 and 26 November) and the final (on 28 November) were all scheduled at North Sydney Oval under lights. Additionally, a reserve day on 29 November was allocated in the event of weather preventing a result in the final's original fixture.

All times are local time

=== Week 1 ===
Match 1
25 October 2020
10:20
Scorecard

| Perth Scorchers; 7/132 (20 overs) | v | Brisbane Heat; 3/134 (17 overs) |
| Beth Mooney 37 (33); Nicola Hancock 2/25 (3 overs) | | Grace Harris 53 (37); Heather Graham 1/14 (3 overs) |

Brisbane Heat won by 7 wickets (with 18 balls remaining)
North Sydney Oval
Umpires: Nathan Johnstone and Greg Davidson
Player of the match: Grace Harris (Brisbane Heat)

- Brisbane Heat won the toss and elected to field
- Broadcast by Seven Network and Fox Cricket
- Venue changed from Hurstville Oval

Match 2
25 October 2020
10:30
Scorecard

| Hobart Hurricanes; 84 (16.3 overs) | v | Adelaide Strikers; 2/85 (14 overs) |
| Naomi Stalenberg 28 (28); Darcie Brown 3/13 (4 overs) | | Laura Wolvaardt 51* (42); Chloe Tryon 1/13 (3 overs) |

Adelaide Strikers won by 8 wickets (with 36 balls remaining)
Hurstville Oval
Umpires: Muhammad Qureshi and Bede Sajowitz
Player of the match: Laura Wolvaardt (Adelaide Strikers)

- Adelaide Strikers won the toss and elected to field
- Broadcast by Cricket Network

Match 3
25 October 2020
13:45
Scorecard

| Sydney Thunder | v | Sydney Sixers |

No result
North Sydney Oval
Umpires: David Taylor and Stephen Dionysius

- Sydney Sixers won the toss and elected to field
- No play was possible due to rain
- Broadcast by Seven Network and Fox Cricket

Match 4
25 October 2020
14:30
Scorecard

| Melbourne Stars; 4/127 (17 overs) | v | Melbourne Renegades |
| Meg Lanning 51* (50); Carly Leeson 2/28 (3 overs) |

No result
Hurstville Oval
Umpires: Roberto Howard and Jeremiah Matibiri

- Melbourne Renegades won the toss and elected to field
- No further play was possible due to rain
- Broadcast by Cricket Network
- Venue changed from North Sydney Oval

Match 5
26 October 2020
09:30
Scorecard

| Sydney Thunder; 2/13 (4 overs) | v | Melbourne Stars |
| Heather Knight 4* (6); Nat Sciver 1/3 (1 over) |

No result
North Sydney Oval
Umpires: Nathan Robert Johnstone and Muhammad Qureshi

- Melbourne Stars won the toss and elected to field
- No further play was possible due to rain
- Broadcast by Cricket Network

Match 6
26 October 2020
09:30
Scorecard

| Brisbane Heat | v | Melbourne Renegades |

Match abandoned
Hurstville Oval
Umpires: David Taylor and Tony Wilds

- No toss
- No play was possible due to rain
- Broadcast by Cricket Network

Match 7
26 October 2020
14:30
Scorecard

| Perth Scorchers | v | Hobart Hurricanes |

Match abandoned
Hurstville Oval
Umpires: Simon Lightbody and Bede Sajowitz

- No toss
- No play was possible due to rain
- Broadcast by Cricket Network

Match 8
26 October 2020
14:30
Scorecard

| Adelaide Strikers; 7/68 (9 overs) | v | Sydney Sixers; 1/47 (5.4 overs) |
| Bridget Patterson 28 (14); Marizanne Kapp 3/14 (2 overs) | | Alyssa Healy 27 (16); Sarah Coyte 1/10 (1 over) |

Sydney Sixers won by 9 wickets (with 2 balls remaining) (DLS method)
North Sydney Oval
Umpires: Stephen Dionysius and Greg Davidson
Player of the match: Alyssa Healy (Sydney Sixers)

- Sydney Sixers won the toss and elected to field
- Match reduced to 9 overs per side due to rain
- Sydney Sixers were set a revised target of 46 runs from 6 overs due to further rain delays
- Broadcast by Cricket Network

=== Week 2 ===
Match 9
31 October 2020
12:15
Scorecard

| Sydney Thunder; 6/190 (20 overs) | v | Adelaide Strikers; 8/132 (20 overs) |
| Heather Knight 83 (39); Sarah Coyte 3/32 (4 overs) | | Tahlia McGrath 46 (37); Lauren Smith 3/26 (4 overs) |

Sydney Thunder won by 58 runs
Sydney Showground Stadium
Umpires: Nathan Johnstone and Jeremiah Matibiri
Player of the match: Heather Knight (Sydney Thunder)

- Adelaide Strikers won the toss and elected to field
- Broadcast by Seven Network and Fox Cricket

Match 10
31 October 2020
14:30
Scorecard

| Melbourne Renegades; 5/105 (20 overs) | v | Perth Scorchers; 0/62 (9.5 overs) |
| Courtney Webb 33 (44); Nicole Bolton 2/13 (4 overs) | | Sophie Devine 31* (28) |

Perth Scorchers won by 18 runs (DLS method)
Drummoyne Oval
Umpires: Bede Sajowitz and Stephen Dionysius
Player of the match: Sophie Devine (Perth Scorchers)

- Perth Scorchers won the toss and elected to field
- No further play was possible due to rain
- Broadcast by Cricket Network

Match 11
31 October 2020
15:40
Scorecard

| Brisbane Heat; 2/80 (11 overs) | v | Hobart Hurricanes; 0/43 (4.3 overs) |
| Maddy Green 33 (24); Nicola Carey 1/11 (2 overs) | | Chloe Tryon 26* (15) |

No result
Sydney Showground Stadium
Umpires: Roberto Howard and Greg Davidson

- Hobart Hurricanes won the toss and elected to field
- Match was reduced to 11 overs per side due to rain delay
- Hobart Hurricanes were set a revised target of 106 from 11 overs
- No further play was possible due to rain
- Broadcast by Seven Network and Fox Cricket

Match 12
31 October 2020
19:05 (D/N)
Scorecard

| Sydney Sixers | v | Melbourne Stars |

Match abandoned
Sydney Showground Stadium
Umpires: Muhammad Qureshi and Simon Lightbody

- No toss
- No play was possible due to rain
- Broadcast by Seven Network and Fox Cricket

Match 13
1 November 2020
09:30
Scorecard

| Adelaide Strikers; 4/70 (10 overs) | v | Perth Scorchers; 1/25 (2.5 overs) |
| Stafanie Taylor 30 (16); Taneale Peschel 2/5 (2 overs) | | Beth Mooney 12* (8); Darcie Brown 1/9 (1 over) |

No result
Drummoyne Oval
Umpires: Muhammad Qureshi and Jeremiah Matibiri

- Perth Scorchers won the toss and elected to field
- Match reduced to 10 overs per side due to rain delay
- Perth Scorchers were set a revised target of 52 from 7 overs due to further rain delay
- No further play was possible due to rain
- Broadcast by Cricket Network

Match 14
1 November 2020
10:20
Scorecard

| Sydney Thunder; 3/80 (12.1 overs) | v | Brisbane Heat; 7/30 (5 overs) |
| Rachel Trenaman 38 (34); Nicola Hancock 1/9 (2.1 overs) | | Jess Jonassen 14 (9); Heather Knight 3/4 (1 over) |

Sydney Thunder won by 14 runs (DLS method)
Sydney Showground Stadium
Umpires: Roberto Howard and Tony Wilds
Player of the match: Samantha Bates (Sydney Thunder)

- Brisbane Heat won the toss and elected to field
- Sydney Thunder's innings reduced to 12.1 overs due to rain delay
- Brisbane Heat were set a revised target of 45 from 5 overs
- Broadcast by Seven Network and Fox Cricket

Match 15
1 November 2020
13:45
Scorecard

| Melbourne Renegades; 7/119 (18 overs) | v | Sydney Sixers; 2/121 (13.1 overs) |
| Georgia Wareham 54* (27); Stella Campbell 3/32 (4 overs) | | Alyssa Healy 60 (31); Georgia Wareham 2/35 (3 overs) |

Sydney Sixers won by 8 wickets (with 29 balls remaining) (DLS method)
Sydney Showground Stadium
Umpires: Greg Davidson and Bede Sajowitz
Player of the match: Alyssa Healy (Sydney Sixers)

- Sydney Sixers won the toss and elected to field
- Match reduced to 18 overs per side due to rain delay
- Broadcast by Seven Network and Fox Cricket

Match 16
1 November 2020
14:30
Scorecard

| Hobart Hurricanes; 9/89 (19 overs) | v | Melbourne Stars; 2/93 (11.2 overs) |
| Nicola Carey 26* (37); Katherine Brunt 3/17 (4 overs) | | Elyse Villani 51* (32); Brooke Hepburn 1/6 (1 over) |

Melbourne Stars won by 8 wickets (with 46 balls remaining)
Drummoyne Oval
Umpires: Nathan Johnstone and Stephen Dionysius
Player of the match: Katherine Brunt (Melbourne Stars)

- Melbourne Stars won the toss and elected to field
- Match reduced to 19 overs per side due to rain delay
- Broadcast by Cricket Network

Match 17
3 November 2020
14:30
Scorecard

| Melbourne Renegades; 81 (19.5 overs) | v | Hobart Hurricanes; 1/82 (12.3 overs) |
| Amy Satterthwaite 20 (28); Nicola Carey 3/14 (3.5 overs) | | Naomi Stalenberg 35* (38); Amy Satterthwaite 1/11 (1 over) |

Hobart Hurricanes won by 9 wickets (with 45 balls remaining)
Blacktown International Sportspark
Umpires: Roberto Howard and Jeremiah Matibiri
Player of the match: Nicola Carey (Hobart Hurricanes)

- Hobart Hurricanes won the toss and elected to field
- Broadcast by Fox Cricket and Cricket Network

Match 18
3 November 2020
19:05 (D/N)
Scorecard

| Adelaide Strikers; 6/154 (20 overs) | v | Melbourne Stars; 3/159 (19.4 overs) |
| Laura Wolvaardt 68 (50); Alana King 2/23 (4 overs) | | Meg Lanning 69 (58); Madeline Penna 2/11 (2 overs) |

Melbourne Stars won by 7 wickets (with 2 balls remaining)
Blacktown International Sportspark
Umpires: David Taylor and Simon Lightbody
Player of the match: Meg Lanning (Melbourne Stars)

- Melbourne Stars won the toss and elected to field
- Broadcast by Fox Cricket and Cricket Network

Match 19
4 November 2020
14:30
Scorecard

| Sydney Thunder; 4/144 (20 overs) | v | Perth Scorchers; 120 (19.4 overs) |
| Rachael Haynes 61* (51); Piepa Cleary 1/8 (1 over) | | Beth Mooney 61 (49); Samantha Bates 3/9 (4 overs) |

Sydney Thunder won by 24 runs
Blacktown International Sportspark
Umpires: Roberto Howard and Stephen Dionysius
Player of the match: Rachael Haynes (Sydney Thunder)

- Perth Scorchers won the toss and elected to field
- Broadcast by Fox Cricket and Cricket Network

Match 20
4 November 2020
19:05 (D/N)
Scorecard

| Sydney Sixers; 7/129 (20 overs) | v | Brisbane Heat; 105 (19 overs) |
| Ellyse Perry 54 (54); Jess Jonassen 4/28 (4 overs) | | Nadine de Klerk 32 (23); Ellyse Perry 3/17 (4 overs) |

Sydney Sixers won by 24 runs
Blacktown International Sportspark
Umpires: Jeremiah Matibiri and Greg Davidson
Player of the match: Ellyse Perry (Sydney Sixers)

- Sydney Sixers won the toss and elected to bat
- Broadcast by Fox Cricket and Cricket Network

=== Week 3 ===
Match 21
7 November 2020
12:15
Scorecard

| Adelaide Strikers; 8/153 (20 overs) | v | Brisbane Heat; 8/135 (20 overs) |
| Katie Mack 50 (37); Jess Jonassen 2/25 (4 overs) | | Georgia Redmayne 65 (47); Amanda-Jade Wellington 2/19 (3 overs) |

Adelaide Strikers won by 18 runs
North Sydney Oval
Umpires: David Taylor and Jeremiah Matibiri
Player of the match: Katie Mack (Adelaide Strikers)

- Brisbane Heat won the toss and elected to field
- Broadcast by Seven Network and Fox Cricket

Match 22
7 November 2020
14:30
Scorecard

| Melbourne Renegades; 110 (20 overs) | v | Sydney Thunder; 7/108 (20 overs) |
| Sophie Molineux 34 (42); Sammy-Jo Johnson 4/26 (4 overs) | | Rachel Trenaman 26 (28); Sophie Molineux 2/19 (4 overs) |

Melbourne Renegades won by 2 runs
Hurstville Oval
Umpires: Roberto Howard and Bede Sajowitz
Player of the match: Sammy-Jo Johnson (Sydney Thunder)

- Sydney Thunder won the toss and elected to field
- Broadcast by Cricket Network

Match 23
7 November 2020
15:40
Scorecard

| Sydney Sixers; 6/149 (20 overs) | v | Hobart Hurricanes; 8/140 (20 overs) |
| Ashleigh Gardner 53 (35); Hayley Matthews 3/15 (3 overs) | | Nicola Carey 38 (40); Ashleigh Gardner 2/20 (4 overs) |

Sydney Sixers won by 9 runs
North Sydney Oval
Umpires: Muhammad Qureshi and Tony Wilds
Player of the match: Ashleigh Gardner (Sydney Sixers)

- Sydney Sixers won the toss and elected to bat
- Broadcast by Seven Network and Fox Cricket

Match 24
7 November 2020
19:05 (D/N)
Scorecard

| Perth Scorchers; 118 (20 overs) | v | Melbourne Stars; 2/120 (15.2 overs) |
| Heather Graham 29 (30); Alana King 2/16 (4 overs) | | Meg Lanning 51* (38); Piepa Cleary 1/13 (2 overs) |

Melbourne Stars won by 8 wickets (with 28 balls remaining)
North Sydney Oval
Umpires: Simon Lightbody and Stephen Dionysius
Player of the match: Nat Sciver (Melbourne Stars)

- Melbourne Stars won the toss and elected to field
- Broadcast by Seven Network and Fox Cricket

Match 25
8 November 2020
09:30
Scorecard

| Sydney Thunder; 7/129 (20 overs) | v | Hobart Hurricanes; 7/128 (20 overs) |
| Heather Knight 61* (49); Amy Smith 2/15 (3 overs) | | Rachel Priest 83* (64); Heather Knight 2/12 (3 overs) |

Sydney Thunder won by 1 run
Hurstville Oval
Umpires: Jeremiah Matibiri and Stephen Dionysius
Player of the match: Heather Knight (Sydney Thunder)

- Hobart Hurricanes won the toss and elected to field
- Broadcast by Cricket Network

Match 26
8 November 2020
10:20
Scorecard

| Adelaide Strikers; 9/127 (20 overs) | v | Melbourne Renegades; 8/121 (20 overs) |
| Stafanie Taylor 60 (48); Sophie Molineux 3/20 (4 overs) | | Georgia Wareham 42 (32); Sarah Coyte 2/21 (4 overs) |

Adelaide Strikers won by 6 runs
North Sydney Oval
Umpires: Nathan Johnstone and David Taylor
Player of the match: Stafanie Taylor (Adelaide Strikers)

- Adelaide Strikers won the toss and elected to bat
- Broadcast by Seven Network and Fox Cricket

Match 27
8 November 2020
13:45
Scorecard

| Melbourne Stars; 9/177 (20 overs) | v | Brisbane Heat; 8/154 (20 overs) |
| Meg Lanning 54 (25); Amelia Kerr 3/35 (4 overs) | | Grace Harris 81* (52); Alana King 2/22 (4 overs) |

Melbourne Stars won by 23 runs
North Sydney Oval
Umpires: Tony Wilds and Bede Sajowitz
Player of the match: Meg Lanning (Melbourne Stars)

- Brisbane Heat won the toss and elected to field
- Broadcast by Seven Network and Fox Cricket

Match 28
8 November 2020
14:30
Scorecard

| Perth Scorchers; 4/183 (20 overs) | v | Sydney Sixers; 5/147 (20 overs) |
| Sophie Devine 103 (68); Dane van Niekerk 2/33 (4 overs) | | Marizanne Kapp 68* (53); Taneale Peschel 2/28 (4 overs) |

Perth Scorchers won by 36 runs
Hurstville Oval
Umpires: Roberto Howard and Muhammad Qureshi
Player of the match: Sophie Devine (Perth Scorchers)

- Perth Scorchers won the toss and elected to bat
- Broadcast by Cricket Network

Match 29
10 November 2020
14:30
Scorecard

| Adelaide Strikers; 7/140 (20 overs) | v | Melbourne Stars; 5/144 (19.3 overs) |
| Laura Wolvaardt 46 (40); Nat Sciver 4/29 (4 overs) | | Mignon du Preez 61 (51); Sarah Coyte 2/16 (4 overs) |

Melbourne Stars won by 5 wickets (with 3 balls remaining)
Blacktown International Sportspark
Umpires: Greg Davidson and Andrew Crozier
Player of the match: Nat Sciver (Melbourne Stars)

- Melbourne Stars won the toss and elected to field
- Broadcast by Fox Cricket and Cricket Network

Match 30
10 November 2020
19:05 (D/N)
Scorecard

| Hobart Hurricanes; 7/143 (20 overs) | v | Melbourne Renegades; 5/134 (20 overs) |
| Rachel Priest 42 (37); Sophie Molineux 2/18 (4 overs) | | Lizelle Lee 38 (31); Hayley Matthews 2/19 (4 overs) |

Hobart Hurricanes won by 9 runs
Blacktown International Sportspark
Umpires: Steven Farrell and Sharad Patel
Player of the match: Hayley Matthews (Hobart Hurricanes)

- Melbourne Renegades won the toss and elected to field
- Broadcast by Fox Cricket and Cricket Network

Match 31
11 November 2020
14:30
Scorecard

| Sydney Sixers; 4/137 (20 overs) | v | Perth Scorchers; 5/138 (19.1 overs) |
| Ellyse Perry 62* (52); Nicole Bolton 1/19 (3 overs) | | Beth Mooney 75* (64); Stella Campbell 1/17 (2 overs) |

Perth Scorchers won by 5 wickets (with 5 balls remaining)
Blacktown International Sportspark
Umpires: Steven Farrell and Eloise Sheridan
Player of the match: Beth Mooney (Perth Scorchers)

- Sydney Sixers won the toss and elected to bat
- Broadcast by Fox Cricket and Cricket Network

Match 32
11 November 2020
19:05 (D/N)
Scorecard

| Sydney Thunder; 9/111 (20 overs) | v | Brisbane Heat; 2/115 (16.3 overs) |
| Rachel Trenaman 27 (30); Amelia Kerr 4/20 (4 overs) | | Georgia Redmayne 59* (45); Sammy-Jo Johnson 1/24 (3 overs) |

Brisbane Heat won by 8 wickets (with 21 balls remaining)
Blacktown International Sportspark
Umpires: Troy Penman and Tony Wilds
Player of the match: Georgia Redmayne (Brisbane Heat)

- Sydney Thunder won the toss and elected to bat
- Broadcast by Fox Cricket and Cricket Network

=== Week 4 ===
Match 33
14 November 2020
12:15
Scorecard

| Melbourne Renegades; 3/122 (20 overs) | v | Perth Scorchers; 1/123 (14.5 overs) |
| Amy Satterthwaite 48* (56); Taneale Peschel 2/17 (4 overs) | | Sophie Devine 77* (54); Sophie Molineux 1/25 (2.5 overs) |

Perth Scorchers won by 9 wickets (with 31 balls remaining)
Sydney Showground Stadium
Umpires: Steven Farrell and Ben Treloar
Player of the match: Sophie Devine (Perth Scorchers)

- Perth Scorchers won the toss and elected to field
- Broadcast by Seven Network and Fox Cricket
- Sophie Devine became the first player to hit 100 career sixes in the WBBL

Match 34
14 November 2020
14:30
Scorecard

| Brisbane Heat; 7/136 (20 overs) | v | Adelaide Strikers; 7/122 (20 overs) |
| Laura Kimmince 41 (17); Amanda-Jade Wellington 4/24 (3 overs) | | Tahlia McGrath 52 (62); Grace Harris 4/16 (3 overs) |

Brisbane Heat won by 14 runs
Drummoyne Oval
Umpires: David Taylor and Sharad Patel
Player of the match: Laura Kimmince (Brisbane Heat)

- Adelaide Strikers won the toss and elected to field
- Broadcast by Cricket Network

Match 35
14 November 2020
15:40
Scorecard

| Sydney Sixers; 4/139 (20 overs) | v | Hobart Hurricanes; 1/143 (18.1 overs) |
| Ellyse Perry 72* (68); Amy Smith 2/22 (4 overs) | | Rachel Priest 92* (63) |

Hobart Hurricanes won by 9 wickets (with 11 balls remaining)
Sydney Showground Stadium
Umpires: Greg Davidson and Troy Penman
Player of the match: Rachel Priest (Hobart Hurricanes)

- Sydney Sixers won the toss and elected to bat
- Broadcast by Seven Network and Fox Cricket

Match 36
14 November 2020
19:05 (D/N)
Scorecard

| Sydney Thunder; 5/131 (20 overs) | v | Melbourne Stars; 2/135 (16.5 overs) |
| Rachael Haynes 51 (49); Katherine Brunt 2/19 (3 overs) | | Mignon du Preez 57* (37); Hannah Darlington 1/25 (3 overs) |

Melbourne Stars won by 8 wickets (with 19 balls remaining)
Sydney Showground Stadium
Umpires: Andrew Crozier and Tony Wilds
Player of the match: Nat Sciver (Melbourne Stars)

- Melbourne Stars won the toss and elected to field
- Broadcast by Seven Network and Fox Cricket

Match 37
15 November 2020
09:30
Scorecard

| Adelaide Strikers; 8/119 (20 overs) | v | Sydney Sixers; 9/105 (20 overs) |
| Tegan McPharlin 41* (26); Ellyse Perry 3/14 (4 overs) | | Erin Burns 28 (24); Megan Schutt 3/7 (4 overs) |

Adelaide Strikers won by 14 runs
Drummoyne Oval
Umpires: Tony Wilds and David Taylor
Player of the match: Tegan McPharlin (Adelaide Strikers)

- Sydney Sixers won the toss and elected to field
- Broadcast by Cricket Network
- Ashleigh Gardner (Sydney Sixers) was replaced by Maddy Darke during the match under the concussion sub rule

Match 38
15 November 2020
14:30
Scorecard

| Hobart Hurricanes; 82 (17.5 overs) | v | Brisbane Heat; 0/86 (11.4 overs) |
| Emma Thompson 19 (21); Jess Jonassen 2/8 (3 overs) | | Georgia Redmayne 61* (33) |

Brisbane Heat won by 10 wickets (with 50 balls remaining)
Drummoyne Oval
Umpires: Eloise Sheridan and Andrew Crozier
Player of the match: Georgia Redmayne (Brisbane Heat)

- Hobart Hurricanes won the toss and elected to bat
- Broadcast by Cricket Network
- Venue changed from Sydney Showground Stadium

Match 39
15 November 2020
10:20
Scorecard

| Perth Scorchers; 8/131 (20 overs) | v | Sydney Thunder; 97 (18.3 overs) |
| Sophie Devine 45 (44); Hannah Darlington 3/21 (4 overs) | | Heather Knight 44 (44); Heather Graham 3/22 (3.3 overs) |

Perth Scorchers won by 34 runs
Sydney Showground Stadium
Umpires: Steven Farrell and Claire Polosak
Player of the match: Sophie Devine (Perth Scorchers)

- Perth Scorchers won the toss and elected to bat
- Broadcast by Seven Network and Fox Cricket

Match 40
15 November 2020
13:45
Scorecard

| Melbourne Stars; 8/165 (20 overs) | v | Melbourne Renegades; 7/165 (20 overs) |
| Meg Lanning 41 (29); Ella Hayward 4/16 (4 overs) | | Courtney Webb 54* (33); Holly Ferling 2/21 (3 overs) |

Match tied
Melbourne Renegades won the Super Over
Sydney Showground Stadium
Umpires: Greg Davidson and Sharad Patel
Player of the match: Courtney Webb (Melbourne Renegades)

- Melbourne Renegades won the toss and elected to field
- Broadcast by Seven Network and Fox Cricket
- Venue changed from Drummoyne Oval
- Super Over: Melbourne Renegades 0/16 (1 over), Melbourne Stars 0/12 (1 over)
- Molly Strano became the first player to take 100 career wickets in the WBBL

Match 41
17 November 2020
09:30
Scorecard

| Adelaide Strikers; 6/141 (20 overs) | v | Hobart Hurricanes; 77 (16.4 overs) |
| Madeline Penna 56* (33); Brooke Hepburn 2/23 (3 overs) | | Chloe Tryon 17 (17); Sarah Coyte 3/10 (3 overs) |

Adelaide Strikers won by 64 runs
Hurstville Oval
Umpires: Troy Penman and Ben Treloar
Player of the match: Madeline Penna (Adelaide Strikers)

- Hobart Hurricanes won the toss and elected to field
- Broadcast by Cricket Network

Match 42
17 November 2020
14:30
Scorecard

| Melbourne Stars; 8/149 (20 overs) | v | Perth Scorchers; 8/143 (20 overs) |
| Meg Lanning 57 (39); Nicole Bolton 3/25 (4 overs) | | Beth Mooney 45 (30); Sophie Day 3/16 (4 overs) |

Melbourne Stars won by 6 runs
Hurstville Oval
Umpires: Claire Polosak and Andrew Crozier
Player of the match: Meg Lanning (Melbourne Stars)

- Perth Scorchers won the toss and elected to field
- Broadcast by Cricket Network
- Melbourne Stars qualified for finals

Match 43
17 November 2020
14:30
Scorecard

| Sydney Sixers; 7/122 (20 overs) | v | Brisbane Heat; 7/123 (17.5 overs) |
| Dane van Niekerk 31 (33); Grace Harris 2/13 (3 overs) | | Jess Jonassen 34 (28); Marizanne Kapp 3/20 (4 overs) |

Brisbane Heat won by 3 wickets (with 13 balls remaining)
Sydney Showground Stadium
Umpires: Steven Farrell and Tony Wilds
Player of the match: Grace Harris (Brisbane Heat)

- Sydney Sixers won the toss and elected to bat
- Broadcast by Fox Cricket and Cricket Network
- Venue changed from Blacktown International Sportspark

Match 44
17 November 2020
19:05 (D/N)
Scorecard

| Melbourne Renegades; 7/126 (20 overs) | v | Sydney Thunder; 2/132 (14.3 overs) |
| Josephine Dooley 46 (44); Hannah Darlington 3/22 (4 overs) | | Heather Knight 58* (32); Carly Leeson 1/20 (2 overs) |

Sydney Thunder won by 8 wickets (with 33 balls remaining)
Sydney Showground Stadium
Umpires: David Taylor and Eloise Sheridan
Player of the match: Heather Knight (Sydney Thunder)

- Sydney Thunder won the toss and elected to field
- Broadcast by Fox Cricket and Cricket Network
- Venue changed from Blacktown International Sportspark

Match 45
18 November 2020
09:30
Scorecard

| Perth Scorchers; 8/137 (20 overs) | v | Brisbane Heat; 6/139 (19.2 overs) |
| Beth Mooney 49 (39); Grace Harris 2/19 (3 overs) | | Laura Kimmince 40* (17); Sarah Glenn 4/31 (4 overs) |

Brisbane Heat won by 4 wickets (with 4 balls remaining)
Hurstville Oval
Umpires: Ben Treloar and Andrew Crozier
Player of the match: Laura Kimmince (Brisbane Heat)

- Brisbane Heat won the toss and elected to field
- Broadcast by Cricket Network

Match 46
18 November 2020
14:30
Scorecard

| Melbourne Stars; 3/159 (20 overs) | v | Hobart Hurricanes; 8/120 (20 overs) |
| Annabel Sutherland 72 (51); Belinda Vakarewa 2/28 (4 overs) | | Rachel Priest 24 (18); Katherine Brunt 2/12 (4 overs) |

Melbourne Stars won by 39 runs
Hurstville Oval
Umpires: Tony Wilds and Sharad Patel
Player of the match: Annabel Sutherland (Melbourne Stars)

- Hobart Hurricanes won the toss and elected to field
- Broadcast by Cricket Network

Match 47
18 November 2020
14:30
Scorecard

| Adelaide Strikers; 6/122 (20 overs) | v | Melbourne Renegades; 3/123 (17.3 overs) |
| Laura Wolvaardt 36 (40); Carly Leeson 3/14 (4 overs) | | Sophie Molineux 52 (43); Amanda-Jade Wellington 1/19 (2 overs) |

Melbourne Renegades won by 7 wickets (with 15 balls remaining)
Sydney Showground Stadium
Umpires: Greg Davidson and Eloise Sheridan
Player of the match: Carly Leeson (Melbourne Renegades)

- Adelaide Strikers won the toss and elected to bat
- Broadcast by Fox Cricket and Cricket Network
- Venue changed from Blacktown International Sportspark

Match 48
18 November 2020
19:05 (D/N)
Scorecard

| Sydney Sixers; 7/147 (20 overs) | v | Sydney Thunder; 8/143 (20 overs) |
| Dane van Niekerk 45 (39); Sammy-Jo Johnson 3/25 (4 overs) | | Phoebe Litchfield 46 (36); Erin Burns 3/28 (4 overs) |

Sydney Sixers won by 4 runs
Sydney Showground Stadium
Umpires: David Taylor and Claire Polosak
Player of the match: Erin Burns (Sydney Sixers)

- Sydney Thunder won the toss and elected to field
- Broadcast by Fox Cricket and Cricket Network
- Venue changed from Blacktown International Sportspark

=== Week 5 ===
Match 49
21 November 2020
09:30
Scorecard

| Melbourne Stars; 5/151 (20 overs) | v | Brisbane Heat; 7/152 (19.2 overs) |
| Mignon du Preez 51 (38); Grace Harris 2/8 (2 overs) | | Georgia Redmayne 37 (32); Tess Flintoff 3/13 (3 overs) |

Brisbane Heat won by 3 wickets (with 4 balls remaining)
Drummoyne Oval
Umpires: Steven Farrell and Greg Davidson
Player of the match: Laura Kimmince (Brisbane Heat)

- Brisbane Heat won the toss and elected to field
- Broadcast by Cricket Network

Match 50
21 November 2020
14:30
Scorecard

| Adelaide Strikers; 6/133 (20 overs) | v | Sydney Thunder; 5/136 (19.4 overs) |
| Katie Mack 58 (52); Sammy-Jo Johnson 3/25 (4 overs) | | Rachel Trenaman 38 (40); Amanda-Jade Wellington 3/33 (4 overs) |

Sydney Thunder won by 5 wickets (with 2 balls remaining)
Drummoyne Oval
Umpires: Andrew Crozier and Sharad Patel
Player of the match: Sammy-Jo Johnson (Sydney Thunder)

- Sydney Thunder won the toss and elected to field
- Broadcast by Cricket Network

Match 51
21 November 2020
15:40
Scorecard

| Hobart Hurricanes; 6/136 (20 overs) | v | Perth Scorchers; 0/140 (14.4 overs) |
| Nicola Carey 36 (31); Samantha Betts 2/24 (4 overs) | | Sophie Devine 87* (53) |

Perth Scorchers won by 10 wickets (with 32 balls remaining)
North Sydney Oval
Umpires: Claire Polosak and Eloise Sheridan
Player of the match: Sophie Devine (Perth Scorchers)

- Perth Scorchers won the toss and elected to field
- Broadcast by Seven Network and Fox Cricket
- Adelaide Strikers, Hobart Hurricanes and Melbourne Renegades were eliminated from finals contention

Match 52
21 November 2020
19:05 (D/N)
Scorecard

| Sydney Sixers; 4/166 (20 overs) | v | Melbourne Renegades; 4/169 (19.1 overs) |
| Alyssa Healy 63 (38); Molly Strano 2/35 (4 overs) | | Lizelle Lee 79 (45); Sarah Aley 2/31 (4 overs) |

Melbourne Renegades won by 6 wickets (with 5 balls remaining)
North Sydney Oval
Umpires: Troy Penman and David Taylor
Player of the match: Lizelle Lee (Melbourne Renegades)

- Melbourne Renegades won the toss and elected to field
- Broadcast by Seven Network and Fox Cricket
- Brisbane Heat qualified for finals

In front of a sold out reduced-capacity home crowd, the Sydney Sixers put on a 104-run opening partnership which came to an end during the 13th over when Alyssa Healy was stumped by Josie Dooley off the bowling of Molly Strano for 63. Two balls later, Ellyse Perry was dismissed for 37 by a spectacular diving catch from Courtney Webb, lauded as a contender for the best of the season. Marizanne Kapp (22 not out from 17 balls) and Erin Burns (19 off 11) helped the Sixers finish their innings with a total of 4/166.

On the first ball of the run chase, Lizelle Lee was dropped at backward point off the bowling of Perry. At just 3/70 in the 11th over, Webb joined Lee in the middle for the Melbourne Renegades to form a rapid 73-run stand from 33 deliveries. Sixers veteran Sarah Aley eventually broke through in the 16th over, removing Lee for 79 via a Burns catch in the outfield. Requiring 24 runs from the remaining 26 balls, Webb (46 not out off 28) saw the Renegades across the line with six wickets in hand inside the last over, mirroring her finishing heroics of a similarly tight encounter between the two teams in WBBL|05. The loss dramatically decreased the Sixers' chances of qualifying for finals heading into the final day of the regular season.

The match was also shrouded in controversy, and the outcome potentially affected, due to an "administration error" self-reported by the Sixers before the commencement of the second innings. Hayley Silver-Holmes, who had missed several previous games due to injury, was named in the team line-up despite not having yet been granted approval by the W/BBL Technical Committee to be added back into the official squad. Upon discovering the mistake, the Sixers ensured Silver-Holmes took no active part in the game and Maddy Darke replaced her as a substitute fielder, leaving them a bowler short in what was essentially a must-win game. Cricket Australia (CA) fined the Sixers $25,000 ($15,000 suspended for twelve months) with CA's Head of Integrity and Security stating that the breach, "while serious in nature," had a "reduced impact due to the Club's actions" during the game.

Match 53
22 November 2020
09:30
Scorecard

| Hobart Hurricanes; 9/115 (20 overs) | v | Sydney Thunder; 4/116 (16.5 overs) |
| Sasha Moloney 39 (38); Shabnim Ismail 3/10 (4 overs) | | Heather Knight 25 (15); Nicola Carey 2/23 (3.5 overs) |

Sydney Thunder won by 6 wickets (with 19 balls remaining)
Drummoyne Oval
Umpires: Steven Farrell and Claire Polosak
Player of the match: Shabnim Ismail (Sydney Thunder)

- Sydney Thunder won the toss and elected to field
- Broadcast by Cricket Network
- Sydney Thunder qualified for finals

Match 54
22 November 2020
10:20
Scorecard

| Adelaide Strikers; 6/159 (20 overs) | v | Perth Scorchers; 7/156 (20 overs) |
| Amanda-Jade Wellington 48 (25); Sarah Glenn 4/18 (4 overs) | | Beth Mooney 60 (48); Alex Price 1/12 (2 overs) |

Adelaide Strikers won by 3 runs
North Sydney Oval
Umpires: Ben Treloar and Sharad Patel
Player of the match: Amanda-Jade Wellington (Adelaide Strikers)

- Perth Scorchers won the toss and elected to field
- Broadcast by Seven Network and Fox Cricket

Match 55
22 November 2020
13:45
Scorecard

| Melbourne Stars; 4/178 (19 overs) | v | Sydney Sixers; 5/184 (18.4 overs) |
| Meg Lanning 77 (59); Marizanne Kapp 3/34 (4 overs) | | Alyssa Healy 111 (52); Tess Flintoff 3/32 (3 overs) |

Sydney Sixers won by 5 wickets (DLS method) (with 2 balls remaining)
North Sydney Oval
Umpires: Eloise Sheridan and Tony Wilds
Player of the match: Alyssa Healy (Sydney Sixers)

- Sydney Sixers won the toss and elected to field
- Match reduced to 19 overs per side due to rain delay
- Sydney Sixers were set a revised target of 184 from 19 overs due to rain delay
- Sydney Sixers equalled the record for the highest successful run chase in WBBL history
- Sydney Sixers were eliminated from finals contention
- Perth Scorchers qualified for finals
- Broadcast by Seven Network and Fox Cricket
- Former Australian player Sarah Aley made her last WBBL appearance

Match 56
22 November 2020
13:45
Scorecard

| Brisbane Heat; 6/114 (17 overs) | v | Melbourne Renegades; 76 (16.2 overs) |
| Amelia Kerr 35* (26); Lea Tahuhu 2/16 (4 overs) | | Amy Satterthwaite 14 (13); Georgia Prestwidge 4/12 (3.2 overs) |

Brisbane Heat won by 43 runs (DLS method)
Drummoyne Oval
Umpires: David Taylor and Andrew Crozier
Player of the match: Georgia Prestwidge (Brisbane Heat)

- Melbourne Renegades won the toss and elected to field
- Match reduced to 17 overs per side due to rain delay
- Melbourne Renegades were set a revised target of 120 from 17 overs due to rain delay
- Broadcast by Cricket Network
- Match originally scheduled to begin at 14:30, start time brought forward by 45 minutes

== Knockout phase ==
Semifinals
1 | Melbourne Stars | 3/127
4 | Perth Scorchers | 8/125
2 | Brisbane Heat | 131
3 | Sydney Thunder | 6/143

Finals
Melbourne Stars | 9/86
Sydney Thunder | 3/87

=== Semi-finals ===
Semi-final 1
25 November 2020
19:10 (D/N)
Scorecard

| Perth Scorchers; 8/125 (20 overs) | v | Melbourne Stars; 3/127 (16.2 overs) |
| Nicole Bolton 32 (25); Alana King 3/16 (4 overs) | | Nat Sciver 47* (45); Sophie Devine 1/17 (2.2 overs) |

Melbourne Stars won by 7 wickets (with 22 balls remaining)
North Sydney Oval
Umpires: Troy Penman and Claire Polosak
Player of the match: Alana King (Melbourne Stars)

- Melbourne Stars won the toss and elected to field
- Broadcast by Seven Network and Fox Cricket

Semi-final 2
26 November 2020
19:10 (D/N)
Scorecard

| Sydney Thunder; 6/143 (20 overs) | v | Brisbane Heat; 131 (18.3 overs) |
| Rachael Haynes 48* (44); Nadine de Klerk 2/11 (3 overs) | | Laura Kimmince 37 (17); Hannah Darlington 3/19 (3 overs) |

Sydney Thunder won by 12 runs
North Sydney Oval
Umpires: Eloise Sheridan and Tony Wilds
Player of the match: Hannah Darlington (Sydney Thunder)

- Brisbane Heat won the toss and elected to field
- Broadcast by Seven Network and Fox Cricket
- Former Australian player Delissa Kimmince made her last WBBL appearance

Tammy Beaumont launched the Sydney Thunder off to a fast start with 27 runs from 20 deliveries, though she was brought undone by a Nicola Hancock slower ball during the last over of the powerplay. The Thunder struggled throughout the middle portion of the innings, especially troubled by Brisbane Heat bowlers Nadine de Klerk and Amelia Kerr who collectively managed economical figures of 3/30 from seven overs. Instead of choosing to bowl the 20th over herself, Heat captain Jess Jonassen turned to the medium pace of Delissa Kimmince to close out the innings. Thunder captain Rachael Haynes ensured a respectable total for her team, finishing on 48 not out, as Sydney scored 15 from the final over and set Brisbane a target of 144 for victory.

Thunder spinner Samantha Bates struck early in the run chase, bowling Grace Harris for six, before being hit for three consecutive boundaries in the fourth over by Georgia Redmayne. Soon after playing-and-missing three times in a row to Shabnim Ismail, Redmayne was caught for 25 by Haynes at mid-on off the bowling of Sammy-Jo Johnson. Promoted up the batting order to number three, de Klerk formed a steady partnership with Jonassen, putting on 46 runs together in little more than six overs. When Jonassen fell for 19 (caught-and-bowled by Hannah Darlington) the Heat required a manageable task of 64 runs from 52 balls with seven wickets in hand. In the following over, de Klerk was run out by a direct hit from Beaumont for a run-a-ball 27. Facing her first delivery, Laura Kimmince survived an extremely close call, playing a flighted Bates delivery on to leg stump—the ball, however, did not connect with enough force to dislodge the bails. Kimmince quickly took advantage of her luck, manically compiling 37 runs from her next 15 balls. Although her aggressive strokeplay led to a plummeting required run rate, she was involved in two running-between-the-wickets mix-ups which led to the run outs of Georgia Voll and Amelia Kerr, keeping the door ajar for a miraculous Sydney comeback.

On the last delivery of the 17th over, with the Brisbane Heat needing just 16 runs to win, Laura Kimmince attempted a high-risk reverse slog against Samantha Bates, only to miss the ball which deflected off her thigh before crashing into the stumps—the bails, this time, were sent airborne. Taking the ball in the 18th over, Hannah Darlington struck twice in two balls to put the Heat in the precarious position of needing 14 runs with only one wicket in hand. Sammy-Jo Johnson completed the Thunder's remarkable resurrection on the third ball of the 19th over, removing Delissa Kimmince for a golden duck via caught-and-bowled, sealing a twelve-run victory and cementing Sydney's spot in Saturday's final. Brisbane's sudden "horror" collapse consisted of losing six wickets for twelve runs, ultimately ending their seven-match winning streak and quest for a three-peat. Media outlets described the match and its unlikely outcome as "chaotic," a "rollercoaster" and "one of the best comebacks in the WBBL's short history." Seven Network commentator Trent Copeland said "when Kimmince was flying you thought the game was gone," and Fox Cricket analyst Molly Strano commented "I don't think I've seen such massive swings in momentum in a game, ever."

=== Final ===
28 November 2020
19:10 (D/N)
Scorecard

| Melbourne Stars; 9/86 (20 overs) | v | Sydney Thunder; 3/87 (13.4 overs) |
| Katherine Brunt 22* (27); Sammy-Jo Johnson 2/11 (4 overs) | | Heather Knight 26* (19); Tess Flintoff 1/6 (1 over) |

Sydney Thunder won by 7 wickets (with 38 balls remaining)
North Sydney Oval
Umpires: Claire Polosak and Eloise Sheridan
Player of the match: Shabnim Ismail (Sydney Thunder)

- Melbourne Stars won the toss and elected to bat
- Broadcast by Seven Network and Fox Cricket
- Sydney Thunder won their second WBBL title

From the first over of the match, the Melbourne Stars top-order was dominated by a "fiery" spell from Sydney Thunder pace bowler Shabnim Ismail, who regularly beat the bat of Elyse Villani and created two catching opportunities against Meg Lanning before dismissing both players for scores of one and 13 respectively. After being dropped on zero by Tammy Beaumont at point, as well as surviving a half-chance which Sammy-Jo Johnson put down at third man, Lanning's seven-ball battle with Ismail came to an end when she edged a seaming delivery through to wicket-keeper Tahlia Wilson at the start of the seventh over. Thunder captain Rachael Haynes was praised for "sensing the moment" by taking the tactical risk of persisting with Ismail, leading to Lanning's wicket which several media outlets described as the defining moment of the match: writing for The Sydney Morning Herald, Tom Decent said "this was the Thunder's night about a quarter of an hour into the contest," while the Australian Associated Press suggested the "Stars' shot at a maiden title was realistically gone inside 37 balls."

Melbourne could not recover from their poor start to post a significant total, slumping further to 5/37 by the halfway mark of the first innings. Annabel Sutherland scored 20 from as many balls but, like Lanning, did not capitalise on two reprieves afforded to her by the Thunder's underwhelming performance in the field. Wickets continued to flow as every Sydney bowler picked up at least one each. Johnson, having opened the bowling with Ismail and proving similarly difficult to score against, finished with match-best figures of 2/11 off four overs which included claiming the wicket of Mignon du Preez via LBW during the powerplay. Katherine Brunt, ending the innings on 22 not out from 27 deliveries, ensured the Stars lasted the allotted 20 overs but their overall score of 9/86 was nevertheless the lowest-ever in a WBBL final.

In reply, Tammy Beaumont (16 off 15) and Rachel Trenaman (23 off 26) steadily opened the Thunder's innings, while experienced campaigners Heather Knight (26 not out) and Rachael Haynes (21 not out) completed the comfortable run chase through a flurry of boundaries. With a lofted drive over long-off that sailed for six, Knight hit the winning runs off the bowling of Alana King in the 14th over, clinching a seven-wicket victory with 38 balls remaining. The Sydney Thunder consequently claimed their second WBBL championship, having also won the inaugural title—only Haynes and Samantha Bates were members of both successful squads, the latter missing the WBBL|01 final due to a broken wrist injury sustained earlier in the tournament. The triumph also marked an individual three-peat for Sammy-Jo Johnson, who won the WBBL|04 and WBBL|05 titles with the Brisbane Heat before moving to the Thunder. Lauren Smith—making her fifth appearance in a WBBL final—earned a third Women's Big Bash League championship as well, having won the WBBL|02 and WBBL|03 titles with the Sydney Sixers.

A major talking point of the match surrounded the decision made by the Melbourne Stars at the bat flip. Stars captain Meg Lanning sent her own team in to bat first, a noticeable departure from the tactics she employed throughout the season. In fact, it was the first time a Lanning-led WBBL team would opt against chasing since the 2016–17 season. Explaining the shock choice, Lanning said: "We just thought our batting line-up was in really good form, and we thought we'd back ourselves in to get a decent score." Stars coach Trent Woodhill implied the decision was swayed by the Brisbane Heat's collapse under pressure two days earlier: "We also saw what happened with the Heat and the Thunder (semi-final) the other night." The following day, Woodhill added: "It was a sliding door moment. There's no regrets. It was a team decision."

== Statistics ==
=== Highest totals ===
| Team | Score | Against | Venue | Date |
|---|---|---|---|---|
| Sydney Thunder | 6/190 (20 overs) | Adelaide Strikers | Sydney Showground Stadium | 31 October 2020 |
| Sydney Sixers | 5/184 (18.4 overs) | Melbourne Stars | North Sydney Oval | 22 November 2020 |
| Perth Scorchers | 4/183 (20 overs) | Sydney Sixers | Hurstville Oval | 8 November 2020 |
| Melbourne Stars | 4/178 (19 overs) | Sydney Sixers | North Sydney Oval | 22 November 2020 |
| Melbourne Stars | 9/177 (20 overs) | Brisbane Heat | North Sydney Oval | 8 November 2020 |

- Source: CricInfo

=== Most runs ===
| Player | Team | Runs |
|---|---|---|
| Beth Mooney | Perth Scorchers | 551 |
| Meg Lanning | Melbourne Stars | 493 |
| Sophie Devine | Perth Scorchers | 460 |
| Heather Knight | Sydney Thunder | 446 |
| Alyssa Healy | Sydney Sixers | 402 |

- Source: CricInfo

=== Most wickets ===
| Player | Team | Wickets |
|---|---|---|
| Sammy-Jo Johnson | Sydney Thunder | 22 |
| Hannah Darlington | Sydney Thunder | 19 |
| Nat Sciver | Melbourne Stars | 19 |
| Sarah Coyte | Adelaide Strikers | 18 |
| Samantha Bates | Sydney Thunder | 18 |

- Source: CricInfo

== Awards ==
=== Player of the tournament ===
Player of the Tournament votes are awarded on a 3-2-1 basis by the two standing umpires at the conclusion of every match, meaning a player can receive a maximum of six votes per game.

| Pos. | Player | Team | Votes |
|---|---|---|---|
| 1st | Sophie Devine | Perth Scorchers | 31 |
| 2nd | Meg Lanning | Melbourne Stars | 29 |
| 3rd | Heather Knight | Sydney Thunder | 28 |
| =4th | Grace Harris | Brisbane Heat | 22 |
| =4th | Alyssa Healy | Sydney Sixers | 22 |
| =5th | Nat Sciver | Melbourne Stars | 21 |
| =5th | Mignon du Preez | Melbourne Stars | 21 |

=== Team of the tournament ===
The selection panel for the Team of the Tournament was made up of former players Lisa Sthalekar (Seven Network) and Mel Jones (Fox Cricket), cricket.com.au journalist Laura Jolly and national selector Shawn Flegler. The team is intended to mimic regular WBBL conditions such as a maximum of three overseas players, a realistic mix of batters and bowlers, as well as a captain, wicket-keeper, twelfth man and coach.

- Beth Mooney (Perth Scorchers) – wicket-keeper
- Sophie Devine (Perth Scorchers)
- Meg Lanning (Melbourne Stars) – captain
- Heather Knight (Sydney Thunder)
- Nat Sciver (Melbourne Stars)
- Laura Kimmince (Brisbane Heat)
- Alana King (Melbourne Stars)
- Sarah Coyte (Adelaide Strikers)
- Hannah Darlington (Sydney Thunder)
- Taneale Peschel (Perth Scorchers)
- Samantha Bates (Sydney Thunder)
- Darcie Brown (Adelaide Strikers) – twelfth player
- Ashley Noffke (Brisbane Heat) – coach

=== Young gun award ===
Players under 21 years of age at the start of the season are eligible for the Young Gun Award. Weekly winners are selected over the course of the season by the Women's National Selection Panel based on match performance, on-field and off-field attitude, as well as their demonstration of skill, tenacity and good sportsmanship. The overall winner receives a $5000 cash prize and access to the Rebel Mentor Program, as well as becoming a member of the Rebel Women Program.

The nominees for the WBBL|06 Young Gun were:

- Week 1: Darcie Brown (Adelaide Strikers) – winner
- Week 2: Rachel Trenaman (Sydney Thunder)
- Week 3: Amy Smith (Hobart Hurricanes)
- Week 4: Courtney Webb (Melbourne Renegades)
- Week 5: Phoebe Litchfield (Sydney Thunder)

Adelaide Strikers fast bowler Darcie Brown took out the overall award, having claimed ten wickets in her debut season at an economy rate of 5.52 runs per over.

=== Most valuable players ===
Each team designated an award to adjudge and recognise their most outstanding contributor for the season.

- Adelaide Strikers: Sarah Coyte
- Brisbane Heat: Amelia Kerr
- Hobart Hurricanes: Rachel Priest
- Melbourne Renegades: Courtney Webb
- Melbourne Stars: Nat Sciver
- Perth Scorchers: Beth Mooney
- Sydney Sixers: Alyssa Healy
- Sydney Thunder: Heather Knight

== Media coverage ==
Television coverage of the competition increased from previous seasons with the Seven Network broadcasting (and Fox Cricket simulcasting) 24 games, up from the 23 that were aired in WBBL|05. The remaining 35 games were streamed on Cricket Australia's website and app. All 59 matches were also available to watch live and on-demand via Kayo. On 15 October, CA announced Fox Cricket would broadcast an additional twelve matches—the mid-week fixtures at Blacktown International Sportspark—bringing the total number of televised WBBL|06 games to 36.

== See also ==
- 2020–21 Big Bash League season
