= 2020–21 Sydney Sixers WBBL season =

Sydney Sixers
2020–21 season
- Sydney Sixers 2020–21 cap logo
- Coach: Ben Sawyer
- Captain(s): Ellyse Perry
- Home ground: North Sydney Oval
- League: WBBL
- Record: 6–6 (5th)
- Finals: DNQ
- Leading Run Scorer: Alyssa Healy – 402
- Leading Wicket Taker: Marizanne Kapp – 13
- Player of the Season: Alyssa Healy

The 2020–21 Sydney Sixers Women's season was the sixth in the team's history. Coached by Ben Sawyer and captained by Ellyse Perry, the Sixers played the entirety of WBBL|06 in a bio-secure Sydney hub due to the COVID-19 pandemic. They finished the regular season in fifth place on the points table, directly below the Perth Scorchers due to an inferior net run rate. Consequently, the Sixers narrowly missed out on qualifying for the finals for the second-straight year.

== Squad ==
Each 2020–21 squad was made up of 15 active players. Teams could sign up to five 'marquee players', with a maximum of three of those from overseas. Marquees are classed as any overseas player, or a local player who holds a Cricket Australia national contract at the start of the WBBL|06 signing period.

Personnel changes made ahead of the season included:

- Lauren Smith departed the Sixers, signing with the Sydney Thunder.
- Angela Reakes returned to the Sixers, where she played the first three WBBL seasons before a two-year stint with the Melbourne Stars.
- Lisa Griffith signed with the Sixers, departing the Sydney Thunder.

The table below lists the Sixers players and their key stats (including runs scored, batting strike rate, wickets taken, economy rate, catches and stumpings) for the season.

| No. | Name | Nat. | Birth date | Batting style | Bowling style | G | R | SR | W | E | C | S | Notes |
Batters
| 29 | Erin Burns | (Australia) | 22 June 1988 | Right-handed | Right-arm off spin | 13 | 160 | 123.07 | 6 | 6.60 | 9 | – | |
| 7 | Maddy Darke | (Australia) | 30 March 2001 | Right-handed | Right-arm off spin | 2 | 1 | 100.00 | – | – | 0 | – | |
| 6 | Ashleigh Gardner | (Australia) | 15 April 1997 | Right-handed | Right-arm off spin | 9 | 93 | 134.78 | 6 | 6.15 | 4 | – | Australian marquee |
| 30 | Angela Reakes | (Australia) | 27 December 1990 | Right-handed | Right-arm leg spin | 13 | 79 | 101.28 | – | – | 3 | – | |
All-rounders
| 14 | Jodie Hicks | (Australia) | 19 January 1997 | Right-handed | Right-arm medium | 13 | 0 | 0.00 | – | – | 1 | – | |
| 17 | Marizanne Kapp | (South Africa) | 4 January 1990 | Right-handed | Right-arm fast medium | 13 | 192 | 106.07 | 13 | 6.14 | 4 | – | Overseas marquee |
| 8 | Ellyse Perry | (Australia) | 3 November 1990 | Right-handed | Right-arm fast | 13 | 390 | 96.53 | 8 | 8.25 | 6 | – | Captain, Australian marquee |
| 20 | Dane van Niekerk | (South Africa) | 14 May 1993 | Right-handed | Right-arm leg spin | 13 | 166 | 101.84 | 10 | 7.28 | 0 | – | Overseas marquee |
Wicket-keeper
| 77 | Alyssa Healy | (Australia) | 24 March 1990 | Right-handed | – | 13 | 402 | 161.44 | – | – | 6 | 5 | Australian marquee |
Bowlers
| 3 | Sarah Aley | (Australia) | 3 June 1984 | Right-handed | Right-arm medium | 8 | 3 | 75.00 | 6 | 8.35 | 1 | – | |
| 18 | Stella Campbell | (Australia) | 15 June 2002 | Right-handed | Right-arm fast medium | 13 | 2 | 50.00 | 10 | 7.96 | 0 | – | |
| 5 | Lauren Cheatle | (Australia) | 6 November 1998 | Left-handed | Left-arm fast medium | 2 | 0 | – | 0 | 6.00 | 1 | – | |
| 54 | Lisa Griffith | (Australia) | 28 August 1992 | Right-handed | Right-arm fast medium | 10 | 25 | 125.00 | 2 | 11.00 | 2 | – | |
| 22 | Emma Hughes | (Australia) | 13 November 2000 | Right-handed | Right-arm medium | 2 | 2 | 100.00 | 1 | 6.00 | 1 | – | |
| 4 | Hayley Silver-Holmes | (Australia) | 18 August 2003 | Right-handed | Right-arm fast medium | 7 | 0 | 0.00 | 4 | 7.63 | 1 | – | |

== Ladder ==
| Pos | Team | Pld | W | L | NR | Pts | NRR |
|---|---|---|---|---|---|---|---|
| 1 | Melbourne Stars (RU) | 14 | 8 | 3 | 3 | 19 | 0.965 |
| 2 | Brisbane Heat | 14 | 8 | 4 | 2 | 18 | 0.543 |
| 3 | Sydney Thunder (C) | 14 | 7 | 5 | 2 | 16 | 0.344 |
| 4 | Perth Scorchers | 14 | 6 | 6 | 2 | 14 | 0.355 |
| 5 | Sydney Sixers | 14 | 6 | 6 | 2 | 14 | −0.084 |
| 6 | Adelaide Strikers | 14 | 6 | 7 | 1 | 13 | 0.135 |
| 7 | Melbourne Renegades | 14 | 4 | 8 | 2 | 10 | −1.008 |
| 8 | Hobart Hurricanes | 14 | 3 | 9 | 2 | 8 | −1.143 |

- The top 4 teams advance to the play-off phase

== Fixtures ==
All times are local time

Match 3
25 October 2020
13:45
Scorecard

| Sydney Thunder | v | Sydney Sixers |

No result
North Sydney Oval
Umpires: David Taylor and Stephen Dionysius

- Sydney Sixers won the toss and elected to field
- No play was possible due to rain
- Broadcast by Seven Network and Fox Cricket

Match 8
26 October 2020
14:30
Scorecard

| Adelaide Strikers; 7/68 (9 overs) | v | Sydney Sixers; 1/47 (5.4 overs) |
| Bridget Patterson 28 (14); Marizanne Kapp 3/14 (2 overs) | | Alyssa Healy 27 (16); Sarah Coyte 1/10 (1 over) |

Sydney Sixers won by 9 wickets (with 2 balls remaining) (D/L method)
North Sydney Oval
Umpires: Stephen Dionysius and Greg Davidson
Player of the match: Alyssa Healy (Sydney Sixers)

- Sydney Sixers won the toss and elected to field
- Match reduced to 9 overs per side due to rain
- Sydney Sixers were set a revised target of 46 runs from 6 overs due to further rain delays
- Broadcast by Cricket Network

Match 12
31 October 2020
19:05 (D/N)
Scorecard

| Sydney Sixers | v | Melbourne Stars |

Match abandoned
Sydney Showground Stadium
Umpires: Muhammad Qureshi and Simon Lightbody

- No toss
- No play was possible due to rain
- Broadcast by Seven Network and Fox Cricket

Match 15
1 November 2020
13:45
Scorecard

| Melbourne Renegades; 7/119 (18 overs) | v | Sydney Sixers; 2/121 (13.1 overs) |
| Georgia Wareham 54* (27); Stella Campbell 3/32 (4 overs) | | Alyssa Healy 60 (31); Georgia Wareham 2/35 (3 overs) |

Sydney Sixers won by 8 wickets (with 29 balls remaining) (DLS method)
Sydney Showground Stadium
Umpires: Greg Davidson and Bede Sajowitz
Player of the match: Alyssa Healy (Sydney Sixers)

- Sydney Sixers won the toss and elected to field
- Match reduced to 18 overs per side due to rain delay
- Broadcast by Seven Network and Fox Cricket

Match 20
4 November 2020
19:05 (D/N)
Scorecard

| Sydney Sixers; 7/129 (20 overs) | v | Brisbane Heat; 105 (19 overs) |
| Ellyse Perry 54 (54); Jess Jonassen 4/28 (4 overs) | | Nadine de Klerk 32 (23); Ellyse Perry 3/17 (4 overs) |

Sydney Sixers won by 24 runs
Blacktown International Sportspark
Umpires: Jeremiah Matibiri and Greg Davidson
Player of the match: Ellyse Perry (Sydney Sixers)

- Sydney Sixers won the toss and elected to bat
- Broadcast by Fox Cricket and Cricket Network

Match 23
7 November 2020
15:40
Scorecard

| Sydney Sixers; 6/149 (20 overs) | v | Hobart Hurricanes; 8/140 (20 overs) |
| Ashleigh Gardner 53 (35); Hayley Matthews 3/15 (3 overs) | | Nicola Carey 38 (40); Ashleigh Gardner 2/20 (4 overs) |

Sydney Sixers won by 9 runs
North Sydney Oval
Umpires: Muhammad Qureshi and Tony Wilds
Player of the match: Ashleigh Gardner (Sydney Sixers)

- Sydney Sixers won the toss and elected to bat
- Broadcast by Seven Network and Fox Cricket

Match 28
8 November 2020
14:30
Scorecard

| Perth Scorchers; 4/183 (20 overs) | v | Sydney Sixers; 5/147 (20 overs) |
| Sophie Devine 103 (68); Dane van Niekerk 2/33 (4 overs) | | Marizanne Kapp 68* (53); Taneale Peschel 2/28 (4 overs) |

Perth Scorchers won by 36 runs
Hurstville Oval
Umpires: Roberto Howard and Muhammad Qureshi
Player of the match: Sophie Devine (Perth Scorchers)

- Perth Scorchers won the toss and elected to bat
- Broadcast by Cricket Network

Match 31
11 November 2020
14:30
Scorecard

| Sydney Sixers; 4/137 (20 overs) | v | Perth Scorchers; 5/138 (19.1 overs) |
| Ellyse Perry 62* (52); Nicole Bolton 1/19 (3 overs) | | Beth Mooney 75* (64); Stella Campbell 1/17 (2 overs) |

Perth Scorchers won by 5 wickets (with 5 balls remaining)
Blacktown International Sportspark
Umpires: Steven Farrell and Eloise Sheridan
Player of the match: Beth Mooney (Perth Scorchers)

- Sydney Sixers won the toss and elected to bat
- Broadcast by Fox Cricket and Cricket Network

Match 35
14 November 2020
15:40
Scorecard

| Sydney Sixers; 4/139 (20 overs) | v | Hobart Hurricanes; 1/143 (18.1 overs) |
| Ellyse Perry 72* (68); Amy Smith 2/22 (4 overs) | | Rachel Priest 92* (63) |

Hobart Hurricanes won by 9 wickets (with 11 balls remaining)
Sydney Showground Stadium
Umpires: Greg Davidson and Troy Penman
Player of the match: Rachel Priest (Hobart Hurricanes)

- Sydney Sixers won the toss and elected to bat
- Broadcast by Seven Network and Fox Cricket

Match 37
15 November 2020
09:30
Scorecard

| Adelaide Strikers; 8/119 (20 overs) | v | Sydney Sixers; 9/105 (20 overs) |
| Tegan McPharlin 41* (26); Ellyse Perry 3/14 (4 overs) | | Erin Burns 28 (24); Megan Schutt 3/7 (4 overs) |

Adelaide Strikers won by 14 runs
Drummoyne Oval
Umpires: Tony Wilds and David Taylor
Player of the match: Tegan McPharlin (Adelaide Strikers)

- Sydney Sixers won the toss and elected to field
- Broadcast by Cricket Network
- Ashleigh Gardner (Sydney Sixers) was replaced by Maddy Darke during the match under the concussion sub rule

Match 43
17 November 2020
14:30
Scorecard

| Sydney Sixers; 7/122 (20 overs) | v | Brisbane Heat; 7/123 (17.5 overs) |
| Dane van Niekerk 31 (33); Grace Harris 2/13 (3 overs) | | Jess Jonassen 34 (28); Marizanne Kapp 3/20 (4 overs) |

Brisbane Heat won by 3 wickets (with 13 balls remaining)
Sydney Showground Stadium
Umpires: Steven Farrell and Tony Wilds
Player of the match: Grace Harris (Brisbane Heat)

- Sydney Sixers won the toss and elected to bat
- Broadcast by Fox Cricket and Cricket Network
- Venue changed from Blacktown International Sportspark

Match 48
18 November 2020
19:05 (D/N)
Scorecard

| Sydney Sixers; 7/147 (20 overs) | v | Sydney Thunder; 8/143 (20 overs) |
| Dane van Niekerk 45 (39); Sammy-Jo Johnson 3/25 (4 overs) | | Phoebe Litchfield 46 (36); Erin Burns 3/28 (4 overs) |

Sydney Sixers won by 4 runs
Sydney Showground Stadium
Umpires: David Taylor and Claire Polosak
Player of the match: Erin Burns (Sydney Sixers)

- Sydney Thunder won the toss and elected to field
- Broadcast by Fox Cricket and Cricket Network
- Venue changed from Blacktown International Sportspark

Match 52
21 November 2020
19:05 (D/N)
Scorecard

| Sydney Sixers; 4/166 (20 overs) | v | Melbourne Renegades; 4/169 (19.1 overs) |
| Alyssa Healy 63 (38); Molly Strano 2/35 (4 overs) | | Lizelle Lee 79 (45); Sarah Aley 2/31 (4 overs) |

Melbourne Renegades won by 6 wickets (with 5 balls remaining)
North Sydney Oval
Umpires: Troy Penman and David Taylor
Player of the match: Lizelle Lee (Melbourne Renegades)

- Melbourne Renegades won the toss and elected to field
- Broadcast by Seven Network and Fox Cricket
- Brisbane Heat qualified for finals

In front of a sold out reduced-capacity home crowd, the Sydney Sixers put on a 104-run opening partnership which came to an end during the 13th over when Alyssa Healy was stumped by Josie Dooley off the bowling of Molly Strano for 63. Two balls later, Ellyse Perry was dismissed for 37 by a spectacular diving catch from Courtney Webb, lauded as a contender for the best of the season. Marizanne Kapp (22 not out from 17 balls) and Erin Burns (19 off 11) helped the Sixers finish their innings with a total of 4/166.

On the first ball of the run chase, Lizelle Lee was dropped at backward point off the bowling of Perry. At just 3/70 in the 11th over, Webb joined Lee in the middle for the Melbourne Renegades to form a rapid 73-run stand from 33 deliveries. Sixers veteran Sarah Aley eventually broke through in the 16th over, removing Lee for 79 via a Burns catch in the outfield. Requiring 24 runs from the remaining 26 balls, Webb (46 not out off 28) saw the Renegades across the line with six wickets in hand inside the last over, mirroring her finishing heroics of a similarly tight encounter between the two teams in WBBL|05. The loss dramatically decreased the Sixers' chances of qualifying for finals heading into the final day of the regular season.

The match was also shrouded in controversy, and the outcome potentially affected, due to an "administration error" self-reported by the Sixers before the commencement of the second innings. Hayley Silver-Holmes, who had missed several previous games due to injury, was named in the team line-up despite not having yet been granted approval by the W/BBL Technical Committee to be added back into the official squad. Upon discovering the mistake, the Sixers ensured Silver-Holmes took no active part in the game and Maddy Darke replaced her as a substitute fielder, leaving them a bowler short in what was essentially a must-win game. Cricket Australia (CA) fined the Sixers $25,000 ($15,000 suspended for twelve months) with CA's Head of Integrity and Security stating that the breach, "while serious in nature," had a "reduced impact due to the Club's actions" during the game.

Match 55
22 November 2020
13:45
Scorecard

| Melbourne Stars; 4/178 (19 overs) | v | Sydney Sixers; 5/184 (18.4 overs) |
| Meg Lanning 77 (59); Marizanne Kapp 3/34 (4 overs) | | Alyssa Healy 111 (52); Tess Flintoff 3/32 (3 overs) |

Sydney Sixers won by 5 wickets (DLS method) (with 2 balls remaining)
North Sydney Oval
Umpires: Eloise Sheridan and Tony Wilds
Player of the match: Alyssa Healy (Sydney Sixers)

- Sydney Sixers won the toss and elected to field
- Match reduced to 19 overs per side due to rain delay
- Sydney Sixers were set a revised target of 184 from 19 overs due to rain delay
- Sydney Sixers equalled the record for the highest successful run chase in WBBL history
- Sydney Sixers were eliminated from finals contention
- Perth Scorchers qualified for finals
- Broadcast by Seven Network and Fox Cricket
- Former Australian player Sarah Aley made her last WBBL appearance

== Statistics and awards ==
- Most runs: Alyssa Healy – 402 (5th in the league)
- Highest score in an innings: Alyssa Healy – 111 (52) vs Melbourne Stars, 22 November
- Most wickets: Marizanne Kapp – 13 (equal 12th in the league)
- Best bowling figures in an innings: Marizanne Kapp – 3/14 (2 overs) vs Adelaide Strikers, 26 October
- Most catches: Erin Burns – 9 (2nd in the league)
- Player of the Match awards:
  - Alyssa Healy – 3
  - Erin Burns, Ashleigh Gardner, Ellyse Perry – 1 each
- WBBL|06 Player of the Tournament: Alyssa Healy (equal 4th)
- Sixers Most Valuable Player: Alyssa Healy
