= 2020 Australia women's Tri-Nation Series =

International cricket tour

- Date: 31 January–12 February 2020
- Location: Australia
- Result: Australia won the series
- Player of the series: (Australia) Beth Mooney
Teams
Australia	England	India
Captains
Meg Lanning (Note: Rachael Haynes captained Australia in the third WT20I.)	Heather Knight	Harmanpreet Kaur
Most runs
Beth Mooney (208)	Heather Knight (176)	Smriti Mandhana (216)
Most wickets
Tayla Vlaeminck (7) Jess Jonassen (7) Ellyse Perry (7)	Sarah Glenn (5); Sophie Ecclestone (5); Nat Sciver (5); Katherine Brunt (5)	Rajeshwari Gayakwad (10)

The 2020 Australia women's Tri-Nation Series was a cricket tournament that took place in Australia in January and February 2020. It was a tri-nation series between Australia women, England women and the India women cricket teams, with the matches played as Women's Twenty20 International (WT20I) fixtures. All three teams used the series as their final warm-up ahead of the 2020 ICC Women's T20 World Cup.

Ahead of the fifth match of the series, the Australian team were presented with the ICC Women's Championship trophy, after winning the 2017–20 ICC Women's Championship tournament. In the sixth match, Australia beat England by 16 runs, to advance to the final along with India. In the final, Australia beat India by 11 runs to win the series, with Jess Jonassen taking her first five-wicket haul in a WT20I match.

== Squads ==
Australia	England	India
Meg Lanning (c); Rachael Haynes (vc); Erin Burns; Nicola Carey; Ashleigh Gardner; Alyssa Healy (wk); Jess Jonassen; Delissa Kimmince; Sophie Molineux; Beth Mooney; Ellyse Perry; Megan Schutt; Annabel Sutherland; Tayla Vlaeminck; Georgia Wareham	Heather Knight (c); Tammy Beaumont; Katherine Brunt; Kate Cross; Freya Davies; Sophie Ecclestone; Georgia Elwiss; Sarah Glenn; Amy Jones (wk); Nat Sciver; Anya Shrubsole; Lauren Winfield; Fran Wilson; Danni Wyatt; Mady Villiers	Harmanpreet Kaur (c); Smriti Mandhana (vc); Taniya Bhatia (wk); Harleen Deol; Rajeshwari Gayakwad; Richa Ghosh; Veda Krishnamurthy; Shikha Pandey; Nuzhat Parween; Arundhati Reddy; Jemimah Rodrigues; Deepti Sharma; Pooja Vastrakar; Shafali Verma; Poonam Yadav; Radha Yadav

== Points table ==
Pos	Team	Pld	W	L	NR	Pts	NRR
1	Australia (H)	4	2	2	0	4	0.238
2	India	4	2	2	0	4	−0.071
3	England	4	2	2	0	4	−0.169

Source: ESPNcricinfo
(H) Host

== WT20I series ==
=== 1st WT20I ===
31 January 2020
14:10
Scorecard

England; 147/7 (20 overs)	v	India; 150/5 (19.3 overs)
Heather Knight 67 (44); Rajeshwari Gayakwad 2/19 (4 overs)		Harmanpreet Kaur 42* (34); Katherine Brunt 2/33 (3.3 overs)

India Women won by 5 wickets
Manuka Oval, Canberra
Umpires: Donovan Koch (Aus) and Claire Polosak (Aus)
Player of the match: Heather Knight (Eng)

- India Women won the toss and elected to field.

=== 2nd WT20I ===
1 February 2020
14:00
Scorecard

England; 156/4 (20 overs)	v	Australia; 156/8 (20 overs)
Heather Knight 78 (45); Ellyse Perry 1/9 (4 overs)		Beth Mooney 65 (45); Nat Sciver 3/23 (4 overs)

Match tied
(England won the Super Over)
Manuka Oval, Canberra
Umpires: Donovan Koch (Aus) and Tony Wilds (Aus)
Player of the match: Heather Knight (Eng)

- Australia Women won the toss and elected to field.
- Annabel Sutherland (Aus) made her WT20I debut.

=== 3rd WT20I ===
2 February 2020
14:00
Scorecard

India; 103/9 (20 overs)	v	Australia; 104/6 (18.5 overs)
Smriti Mandhana 35 (23); Ellyse Perry 4/13 (4 overs)		Ellyse Perry 49 (47); Rajeshwari Gayakwad 2/18 (4 overs)

Australia Women won by 4 wickets
Manuka Oval, Canberra
Umpires: Claire Polosak (Aus) and Tony Wilds (Aus)
Player of the match: Ellyse Perry (Aus)

- Australia Women won the toss and elected to field.

=== 4th WT20I ===
7 February 2020
14:10
Scorecard

India; 123/6 (20 overs)	v	England; 124/6 (18.5 overs)
Smriti Mandhana 45 (40); Anya Shrubsole 3/31 (4 overs)		Nat Sciver 50 (38); Rajeshwari Gayakwad 3/23 (4 overs)

England Women won by 4 wickets
Junction Oval, Melbourne
Umpires: Claire Polosak (Aus) and Tony Wilds (Aus)
Player of the match: Anya Shrubsole (Eng)

- England Women won the toss and elected to field.

=== 5th WT20I ===
8 February 2020
12:10
Scorecard

Australia; 173/5 (20 overs)	v	India; 177/3 (19.4 overs)
Ashleigh Gardner 93 (57); Deepti Sharma 2/27 (4 overs)		Smriti Mandhana 55 (48); Megan Schutt 1/26 (4 overs)

India Women won by 7 wickets
Junction Oval, Melbourne
Umpires: Donovan Koch (Aus) and Tony Wilds (Aus)
Player of the match: Ashleigh Gardner (Aus)

- India Women won the toss and elected to field.
- This was India Women's highest successful run chase in WT20Is.

=== 6th WT20I ===
9 February 2020
11:40
Scorecard

Australia; 132/7 (20 overs)	v	England; 116/7 (20 overs)
Beth Mooney 50 (40); Sarah Glenn 2/18 (4 overs)		Katherine Brunt 23* (19); Sophie Molineux 3/19 (4 overs)

Australia Women won by 16 runs
Junction Oval, Melbourne
Umpires: Donovan Koch (Aus) and Claire Polosak (Aus)
Player of the match: Sophie Molineux (Aus)

- England Women won the toss and elected to field.

== Final ==
12 February 2020
13:40
Scorecard

Australia; 155/6 (20 overs)	v	India; 144 (20 overs)
Beth Mooney 71* (54); Deepti Sharma 2/30 (4 overs)		Smriti Mandhana 66 (37); Jess Jonassen 5/12 (4 overs)

Australia Women won by 11 runs
Junction Oval, Melbourne
Umpires: Donovan Koch (Aus) and Tony Wilds (Aus)
Player of the match: Jess Jonassen (Aus)

- Australia Women won the toss and elected to bat.
- Richa Ghosh (Ind) made her WT20I debut.
- Jess Jonassen (Aus) took her first five-wicket haul in WT20Is.
