= Gabby Sutcliffe =

Australian cricketer (born 2002)

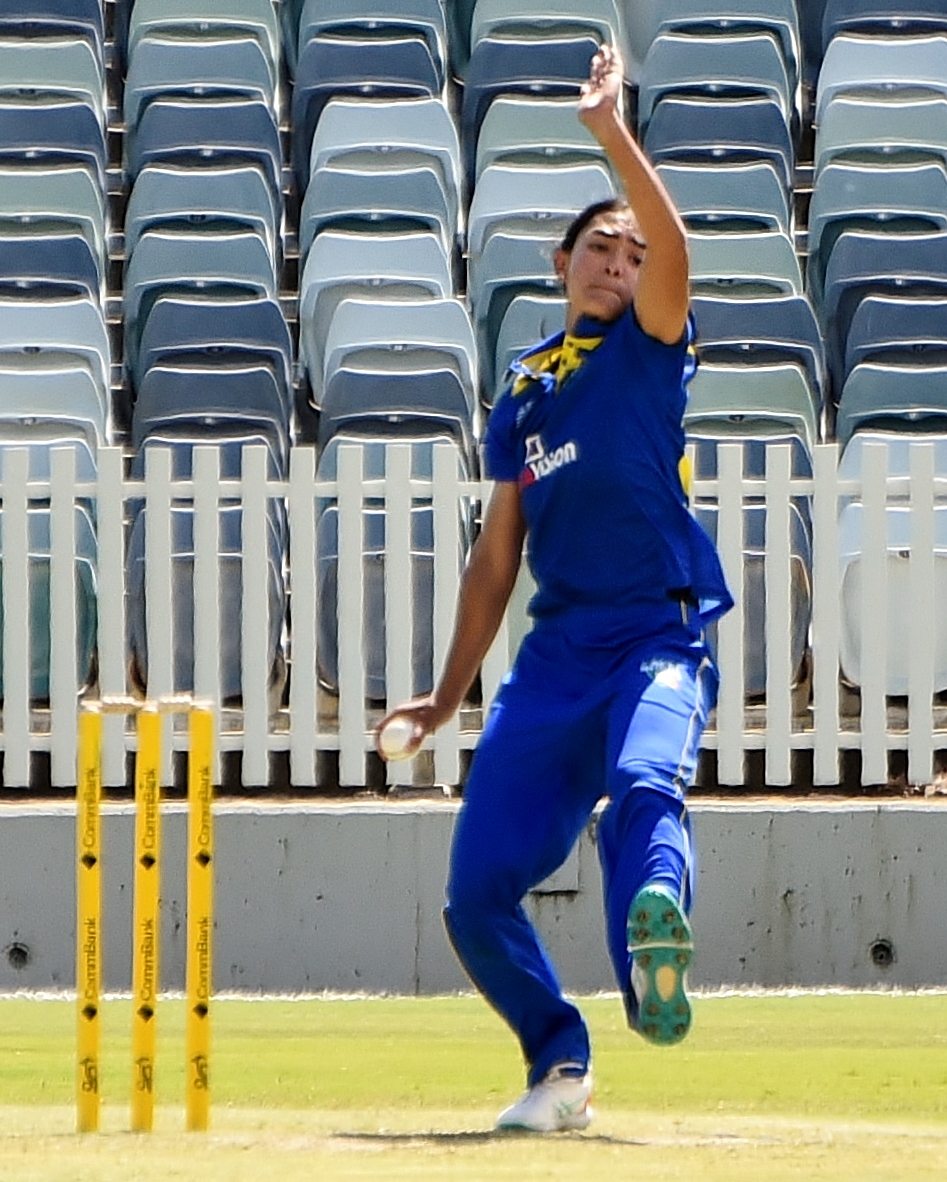
- Sutcliffe bowling for the ACT in September 2022

Personal information
- Full name: Gabrielle Joy Sutcliffe
- Born: 11 April 2002 (age 24); Corowa, New South Wales, Australia
- Batting: Right-handed
- Bowling: Right-arm medium
- Role: Bowler

Domestic team information
- Years: Team
- 2020/21: Sydney Thunder
- 2020/21–present: Australian Capital Territory

Career statistics
Competition	WLA	WT20
Matches	33	6
Runs scored	199	1
Batting average	13.26	1.00
100s/50s	0/0	0/0
Top score	26*	1
Balls bowled	1,246	96
Wickets	32	7
Bowling average	34.59	13.71
5 wickets in innings	0	–
10 wickets in match	0	–
Best bowling	4/35	2/20
Catches/stumpings	9/–	0/–
- Source: CricketArchive, 29 December 2025

Gabrielle Joy "Gabby" Sutcliffe (born 11 April 2002) is an Australian cricketer who plays as a right-arm medium pace bowler and right-handed batter for the ACT Meteors in the Women's National Cricket League (WNCL). She played in one match for Sydney Thunder in the 2020–21 WBBL season but was not required to bat or bowl. She made her debut for the Meteors on 7 March 2021, taking three for 66 against the New South Wales Breakers.
