= Bhavisha Devchand =

Australian cricketer, coach, and podcaster

Bhavi Devchand
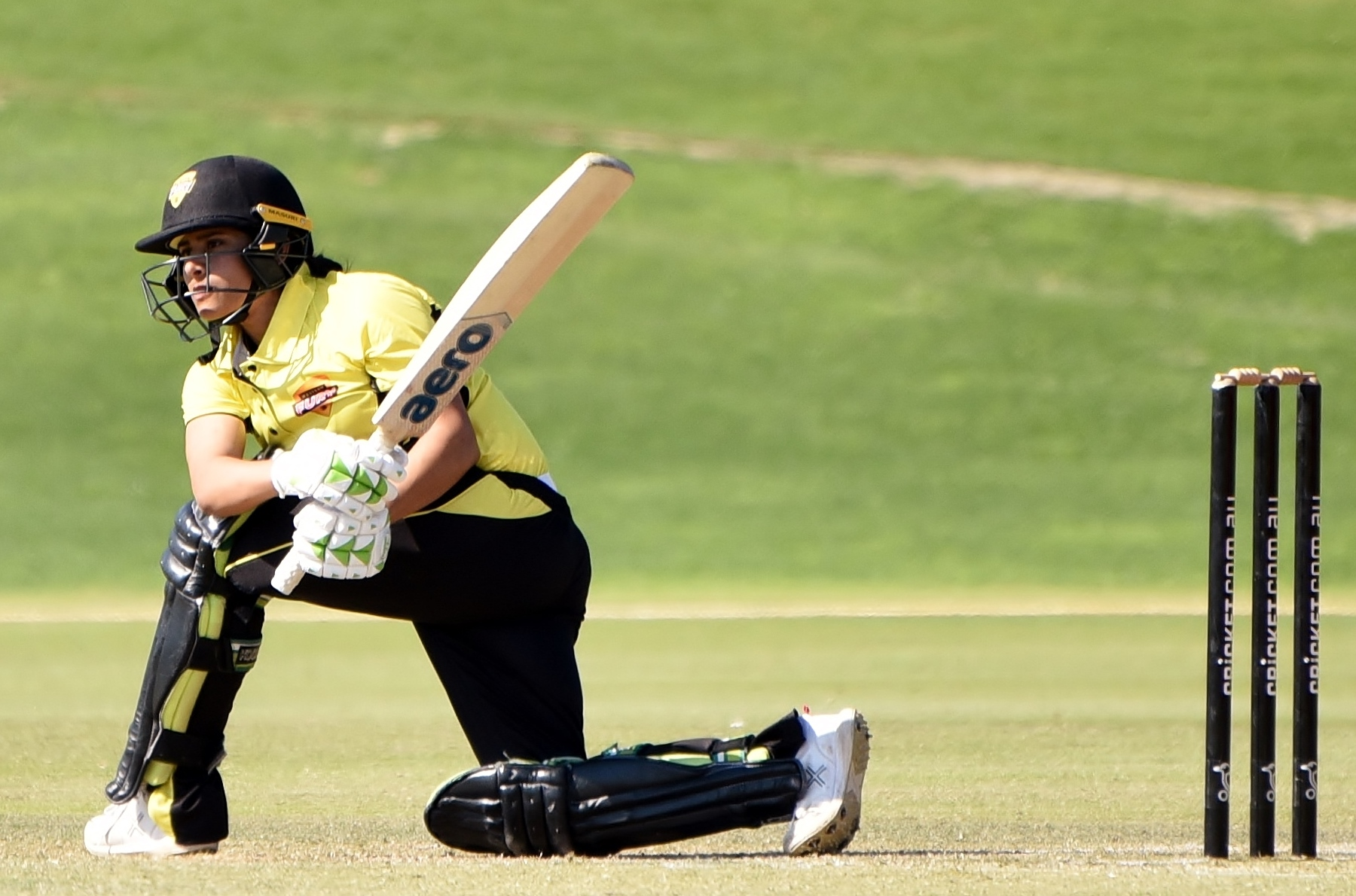
- Devchand batting for Western Fury in 2018

Personal information
- Full name: Bhavisha Devchand
- Born: 24 December 1992 (age 33); Mutare, Zimbabwe
- Height: 163 cm (5 ft 4 in)
- Batting: Right-handed
- Bowling: Right-arm leg break
- Role: All-rounder

Domestic team information
- Years: Team
- 2011/12–2018/19: Western Australia
- 2016: Gloucestershire
- 2018/19: Perth Scorchers
- 2019: Scorchers
- 2020/21: Melbourne Stars
- 2020/21: Victoria
- 2022: Scorchers

Career statistics
Competition	WLA	WT20
Matches	31	8
Runs scored	374	64
Batting average	15.44	9.18
100s/50s	0/2	0/0
Top score	57	18
Balls bowled	309	80
Wickets	5	4
Bowling average	59.20	30.00
5 wickets in innings	0	0
10 wickets in match	0	0
Best bowling	3/56	3/21
Catches/stumpings	5/–	5/–
- Source: CricketArchive, 1 April 2021

Bhavisha Devchand (born 24 December 1992) is an Australian cricketer, coach and podcaster. An all-rounder, she bats right-handed and bowls right-arm leg spin. In 2020–21, she played for Victoria in the Women's National Cricket League (WNCL) and was a member of the Melbourne Stars squad for the Women's Big Bash League (WBBL), but did not play any matches for the Stars. Previously, she played for Western Australia, Gloucestershire, and Perth Scorchers. She also played for Irish team Scorchers in 2019, and returned to play for them in 2022.
