= Sliding doors moment =

Popular concept

The term sliding doors moment became popularised in the late 20th century, meaning seemingly inconsequential moments that nonetheless alter the trajectory of future events.

== Origin ==
The phrase originated from the 1998 film Sliding Doors, written and directed by Peter Howitt and starring Gwyneth Paltrow, which explores the concept of mundane but pivotal moments holding the possibility to change the course of a person's life. The concept was explored earlier by J. B. Priestley in his 1932 play Dangerous Corner.

One notable example of a "sliding doors moment" involved Paltrow herself. On the day of the September 11 attacks, a woman who was crossing a road on her way to the train station was stopped when she came close to a car carrying Paltrow on her way to a yoga class. After doing a double take, the woman proceeded to be late to her intended train, missing the stop, causing her to have not gotten to her job at the World Trade Center in time for its collapse, saving her life.

== Uses ==
Examples of "sliding doors moments" being used in modern vernacular include:

- Princess Diana's last-minute decision to visit Paris on 30 August 1997, leading to her death after leaving her hotel.
- Brian Eno was stuck choosing between two trains to board, and picked one at random. The train contained Andy Mackay, and their coincidental choice of the same train led to the founding of Roxy Music.

== Pop culture references ==
- Frasier season 8, episode 13, "Sliding Frasiers"
- Broad City season 4, episode 1, "Sliding Doors"
- Unbreakable Kimmy Schmidt, season 4, episode 9, "Sliding Van Doors"
- Bob's Burgers, season 6, episode 1, "Sliding Bobs"

== See also ==
- Butterfly effect
- Time loop
- Parallel universe
- Blind Chance, Krzysztof Kieślowski, 1987, filmed in 1981
- Run Lola Run, Tom Tykwer, 1998
