= Eloise Sheridan =

Australian cricket umpire (born 1985)

Personal information
- Born: 3 September 1985 (age 41); Maitland, New South Wales, Australia
- Role: Umpire

Umpiring information
- WTests umpired: 4 (2022–2026)
- WODIs umpired: 29 (2021–2025)
- WT20Is umpired: 39 (2019–2026)
- Source: Cricinfo, 7 February 2024

Eloise Sheridan (born 3 September 1985) is an Australian cricket umpire who is part of the Development Panel of ICC Umpires.

== Career ==
In December 2018, Sheridan and Claire Polosak became the first pair of female umpires to stand in a competitive match in Australia, when they officiated in the 2018–19 Women's Big Bash League season. In February 2019, Sheridan and Mary Waldron became the first female umpires to stand in a men's grade cricket match, during a fixture in the South Australian Grade Cricket League. Sheridan was also one of the umpires for the 2019 ICC Women's World Twenty20 Qualifier tournament in Scotland, her first international appointment.

On 28 November 2020, Sheridan and Claire Polosak were the on-field umpires for the final of the 2020–21 Women's Big Bash League season, the first time two female umpires officiated in a national final. In January 2022, Sheridan was named as one of the on-field umpires for the one-off Women's Test match as part of the Ashes series between Australia and England, her first appointment at Test match level.

She was one of the on-field umpires for the 2022 Women's Cricket World Cup in New Zealand.

On 15 November 2023, Sheridan was one of the first two women, along with Claire Polosak, to umpire a Sheffield Shield match when she officiated in the match between Western Australia and South Australia at the WACA Ground.

In September 2024 she was named as part of an all-female officiating group for the 2024 ICC Women's T20 World Cup.
