= Rachel Trenaman =

Australian cricketer (born 2001)

Personal information
- Full name: Rachel Catherine Trenaman
- Born: 18 April 2001 (age 25); Broken Hill, New South Wales, Australia
- Batting: Right-handed
- Bowling: Right-arm leg break
- Role: Batter

Domestic team information
- Years: Team
- 2016/17–2021/22: New South Wales
- 2017/18–2020/21: Sydney Thunder
- 2021/22–present: Hobart Hurricanes
- 2022/23–present: Tasmania

Career statistics
Competition	WLA	WT20
Matches	50	50
Runs scored	1802	500
Batting average	53.00	15.15
100s/50s	3/12	0/0
Top score	139*	38
Balls bowled	174	90
Wickets	5	4
Bowling average	41.80	31.25
5 wickets in innings	0	0
10 wickets in match	0	–
Best bowling	2/16	2/11
Catches/stumpings	24/–	1/–
- Source: CricketArchive, 2 March 2026

Rachel Catherine Trenaman (born 18 April 2001) is an Australian cricketer who plays as a right-handed batter and occasional right-arm leg break bowler. She plays for Tasmania in the Women's National Cricket League and the Hobart Hurricanes in the Women's Big Bash League.

She made her New South Wales debut as a 15-year-old in late 2016 and was added to the Sydney Thunder squad for WBBL|03. In early 2018, aged 16, she was appointed captain of Australia's 50-over side for an under-19 tour of South Africa, during which she made scores of 122 and 91, and took three wickets.

In November 2018, she was named in Sydney Thunder's squad for the 2018–19 Women's Big Bash League season. In April 2019, Cricket Australia awarded her with a contract with the National Performance Squad ahead of the 2019–20 season. She joined Tasmania ahead of the 2022–23 Women's National Cricket League season.
