= Claire Polosak =

Australian cricket umpire (born 1988)

Personal information
- Full name: Claire Antonia Polosak
- Born: 7 April 1988 (age 38); Goulburn, New South Wales, Australia
- Role: Umpire

Umpiring information
- ODIs umpired: 1 (2019)
- T20Is umpired: 12 (2022)
- WTests umpired: 3 (2021–2025)
- WODIs umpired: 51 (2016–2026)
- WT20Is umpired: 69 (2015–2026)
- Source: ESPN Cricinfo, 7 February 2024

Claire Antonia Polosak (born 7 April 1988) is an Australian cricket umpire. Polosak is a school teacher by profession. She was one of the four female umpires named by the ICC to stand in matches in the 2017 Women's Cricket World Cup Qualifier.

== Career ==
On 8 October 2017, she became the first woman to stand as an on-field umpire in a men's domestic fixture in Australia, in the match between New South Wales and Cricket Australia XI in the 2017–18 JLT One-Day Cup. On 11 January 2018, she became the first woman to umpire a match involving the England men's cricket team, when she stood in a one-day warm up match between England and a Cricket Australia XI.

She was one of the twelve on-field umpires for the 2018 ICC Women's World Twenty20. She was also one of the eight on-field umpires for the 2019 ICC World Cricket League Division Two tournament in Namibia. She was appointed as one of the on-field umpires for the final, becoming the first woman to stand in a men's One Day International (ODI) match. In May 2019, the International Cricket Council named her as one of the eight women on the ICC Development Panel of Umpires. In August 2019, she was named as one of the umpires to officiate in matches during the 2019 ICC Women's World Twenty20 Qualifier tournament in Scotland. In February 2020, the ICC named her as one of the umpires to officiate in matches during the 2020 ICC Women's T20 World Cup in Australia.

On 28 November 2020, Polosak and Eloise Sheridan were the on-field umpires for the final of the 2020–21 Women's Big Bash League season, the first time two female umpires officiated in a national final. She became the first female to be involved as an umpire in a men’s Test match in January 2021, when she was the fourth umpire in the third Test on India's tour to Australia in 2020–21.

In February 2022, she was named as one of the on-field umpires for the 2022 Women's Cricket World Cup in New Zealand. On 9 September 2022, she stood in her first Twenty20 International (T20I) match on 9 September 2022, between Cook Islands and Samoa.

On 15 November 2023 Polosak became the first woman to umpire along with Eloise Sheridan, a Sheffield Shield match when she officiated in the match between Western Australia and South Australia at the WACA Ground.

In September 2024 she was named as part of an all-female officiating group for the 2024 ICC Women's T20 World Cup.

== See also ==
- List of One Day International cricket umpires
