= Tony Wilds (umpire) =

Australian cricket umpire (born 1963)

Personal information
- Full name: Anthony Kevin Wilds
- Born: 1 November 1963 (age 63); Bathurst, New South Wales
- Role: Umpire

Umpiring information
- WODIs umpired: 7 (2014–2016)
- WT20Is umpired: 9 (2014–2020)
- Source: ESPNcricinfo, 30 January 2023

Tony Wilds is an Australian former cricket umpire. He stood in several Domestic cricket matches in Australia including the Men's and Women's Big Bash League competitions. He also stood in some Women's International matches, and served as a TV umpire and reserve umpire for some of these matches. He stepped down as an umpire in 2022.
