= 2021–22 Hobart Hurricanes WBBL season =

Hobart Hurricanes
2021–22 season
- Coach: Salliann Beams
- Captain(s): Rachel Priest
- Home ground: Blundstone Arena
- League: WBBL
- Record: 5–8 (6th)
- Finals: Did not qualify
- Leading Run Scorer: Mignon du Preez – 414
- Leading Wicket Taker: Molly Strano – 15
- Player of the Season: Tayla Vlaeminck

The 2021–22 Hobart Hurricanes Women's season was the seventh in the team's history. Coached by Salliann Beams and captained by Rachel Priest, the Hurricanes were scheduled to play three of 14 WBBL|07 games at Blundstone Arena in Hobart, and five in Launceston (four at UTAS Stadium and one at the neighbouring Invermay Park). They ended the regular season in sixth place on the ladder, failing to qualify for finals for a fifth consecutive campaign despite achieving their best finishing position since WBBL|02.

== Squad ==
Each 2021–22 squad was made up of 15 active players. Teams could sign up to five 'marquee players', with a maximum of three of those from overseas. Marquees were defined as any overseas player, or a local player who holds a Cricket Australia national contract at the start of the WBBL|07 signing period.

Personnel changes made ahead of the season included:

- South African marquee Lizelle Lee initially signed with the Hurricanes, departing the Renegades. However, Lee withdrew from the tournament weeks before its commencement. Indian marquee Richa Ghosh filled the vacancy, signing with the Hurricanes to make her first appearance in the league.
- Barbadian marquee Hayley Matthews and South African marquee Chloe Tryon did not re-sign with the Hurricanes.
- South African marquee Mignon du Preez signed with the Hurricanes, departing the Melbourne Stars.
- Molly Strano signed with the Hurricanes, departing the Melbourne Renegades.
- Corinne Hall departed the Hurricanes, signing with the Sydney Thunder.
- Nell Bryson-Smith departed the Hurricanes after a season as a replacement player, signing with the Adelaide Strikers.
- Brooke Hepburn departed the Hurricanes, retiring after WBBL|06.
- Emma Flint would be unavailable for the season due to maternity leave.
- Rachel Trenaman signed with the Hurricanes, departing the Sydney Thunder. Trenaman would not be available for the season due to injury.
- Rachel Priest was appointed captain, replacing Corinne Hall (7–27 win–loss record).

Squad details during the season included:

- Rachel Priest sustained a broken finger on the first ball of the Hurricanes' bowling innings in a match on 27 October. Richa Ghosh performed wicket-keeping duties for the remainder of the match, though Priest resumed her role for all subsequent fixtures.

The table below lists the Hurricanes players and their key stats (including runs scored, batting strike rate, wickets taken, economy rate, catches and stumpings) for the season.

No.	Name	Nat.	Birth date	Batting style	Bowling style	G	R	SR	W	E	C	S	Notes
Batters
22	Mignon du Preez	(South Africa)	13 June 1989	Right-handed	–	14	414	115.00	–	–	3	–	Overseas marquee
10	Naomi Stalenberg	(Australia)	18 April 1994	Right-handed	Right-arm medium	14	151	93.20	–	–	5	–	
8	Rachel Trenaman	(Australia)	18 April 2001	Right-handed	Right-arm leg spin	–	–	–	–	–	–	–	Unavailable for the season (injury)
All-rounders
16	Nicola Carey	(Australia)	10 September 1993	Left-handed	Right-arm medium	14	181	91.87	13	6.91	1	–	Australian marquee
28	Ruth Johnston	(Australia)	28 February 2003	Right-handed	Right-arm off spin	13	214	94.69	13	6.13	2	–	
99	Sasha Moloney	(Australia)	14 July 1992	Right-handed	Right-arm off spin	14	66	82.50	5	6.57	4	–	
26	Molly Strano	(Australia)	5 October 1992	Right-handed	Right-arm off spin	14	145	136.79	15	7.34	4	–	
Wicket-keepers
18	Richa Ghosh	(India)	28 September 2003	Right-handed	Right-arm medium	14	162	95.29	–	–	5	0	Overseas marquee
3	Rachel Priest	(New Zealand)	13 June 1985	Right-handed	–	14	262	103.96	–	–	7	4	Captain, overseas marquee
Bowlers
6	Angelina Genford	(Australia)	30 October 2002	Right-handed	Right-arm fast medium	1	8	66.66	–	–	0	–	
13	Maisy Gibson	(Australia)	14 September 1996	Left-handed	Right-arm leg spin	–	–	–	–	–	–	–	
7	Chloe Rafferty	(Australia)	16 June 1999	Right-handed	Right-arm fast medium	2	–	–	0	10.00	0	–	
14	Amy Smith	(Australia)	16 November 2004	Right-handed	Right-arm leg spin	14	12	100.00	4	7.35	3	–	
47	Belinda Vakarewa	(Australia)	22 January 1998	Right-handed	Right-arm fast medium	12	19	70.37	7	6.69	3	–	
30	Tayla Vlaeminck	(Australia)	27 October 1998	Right-handed	Right-arm fast	14	48	106.66	13	6.06	2	–	Australian marquee

== Ladder ==
Pos	Team	Pld	W	L	NR	Pts	NRR
1	Perth Scorchers (C)	14	9	3	2	20	0.649
2	Melbourne Renegades (CF)	14	8	4	2	18	−0.149
3	Brisbane Heat (EF)	14	8	5	1	17	0.517
4	Adelaide Strikers (RU)	14	7	6	1	15	0.707
5	Melbourne Stars	14	5	7	2	12	−0.385
6	Hobart Hurricanes	14	5	8	1	11	−0.258
7	Sydney Thunder	14	4	8	2	10	−0.301
8	Sydney Sixers	14	4	9	1	9	−0.704

Source: cricket.com.au, ESPN Cricinfo
- The top 4 teams advanced to the play-off phase

== Fixtures ==
All times are local

Match 2
16 October 2021
15:40
Scorecard

Hobart Hurricanes; 121 (20 overs)	v	Melbourne Renegades; 125/4 (19.2 overs)
Naomi Stalenberg 28 (27); Georgia Wareham 3/13 (4 overs)		Jemimah Rodrigues 33 (34); Belinda Vakarewa 2/21 (4 overs)

Melbourne Renegades won by 6 wickets (with 4 balls remaining)
Blundstone Arena, Hobart
Umpires: Andrew Crozier and Claire Polosak
Player of the match: Georgia Wareham (Melbourne Renegades)

- Hobart Hurricanes won the toss and elected to bat.
- Broadcast by Seven Network and Foxtel

Match 5
17 October 2021
10:15
Scorecard

Hobart Hurricanes; 9/125 (20 overs)	v	Sydney Sixers; 5/129 (19.3 overs)
Richa Ghosh 46 (46); Ellyse Perry 2/9 (2 overs)		Shafali Verma 57 (50); Molly Strano 3/19 (4 overs)

Sydney Sixers won by 5 wickets (with 3 balls remaining)
Blundstone Arena, Hobart
Umpires: Roberto Howard and David Taylor
Player of the match: Shafali Verma (Sydney Sixers)

- Sydney Sixers won the toss and elected to field.
- Broadcast by Seven Network and Foxtel
- Start time swapped with Match 4

Match 6
19 October 2021
13:25
Scorecard

Hobart Hurricanes; 4/152 (20 overs)	v	Melbourne Stars; 89 (19.2 overs)
Rachel Priest 107* (68); Annabel Sutherland 2/22 (4 overs)		Meg Lanning 25 (28); Ruth Johnston 4/8 (3.2 overs)

Hobart Hurricanes won by 63 runs
Blundstone Arena, Hobart
Umpires: Simon Lightbody and Mattis van Eck
Player of the match: Rachel Priest (Hobart Hurricanes)

- Melbourne Stars won the toss and elected to field.
- Broadcast by Cricket Network and Foxtel

Match 10
23 October 2021
10:15
Scorecard

Hobart Hurricanes; 5/107 (16 overs)	v	Adelaide Strikers
Mignon du Preez 39 (35); Amanda-Jade Wellington 2/16 (3 overs)

No result
Invermay Park, Launceston
Umpires: Simon Burns and Roberto Howard

- Adelaide Strikers won the toss and elected to field.
- No further play was possible due to rain.
- Broadcast by Cricket Network and Foxtel

Match 18
26 October 2021
16:50 (N)
Scorecard

Hobart Hurricanes; 8/132 (20 overs)	v	Brisbane Heat; 2/138 (18.3 overs)
Ruth Johnston 47 (42); Jess Jonassen 3/14 (4 overs)		Grace Harris 57* (46); Nicola Carey 2/16 (3 overs)

Brisbane Heat won by 8 wickets (with 9 balls remaining)
University of Tasmania Stadium, Launceston
Umpires: Shawn Craig and Muhammad Qureshi
Player of the match: Grace Harris (Brisbane Heat)

- Brisbane Heat won the toss and elected to field.
- Broadcast by Cricket Network and Foxtel

Match 20
27 October 2021
16:50 (D/N)
Scorecard

Melbourne Stars; 4/144 (20 overs)	v	Hobart Hurricanes; 4/147 (19.2 overs)
Kim Garth 44* (29); Tayla Vlaeminck 3/27 (4 overs)		Mignon du Preez 62 (45); Sophie Day 1/17 (2 overs)

Hobart Hurricanes won by 6 wickets (with 4 balls remaining)
University of Tasmania Stadium, Launceston
Umpires: Simon Lightbody and Claire Polosak
Player of the match: Mignon du Preez (Hobart Hurricanes)

- Hobart Hurricanes won the toss and elected to field.
- Broadcast by Cricket Network and Foxtel

Match 24
30 October 2021
19:30 (N)
Scorecard

Brisbane Heat; 6/170 (20 overs)	v	Hobart Hurricanes; 9/156 (20 overs)
Grace Harris 75 (51); Ruth Johnston 2/30 (4 overs)		Mignon du Preez 73 (49); Jess Jonassen 3/25 (4 overs)

Brisbane Heat won by 14 runs
University of Tasmania Stadium, Launceston
Umpires: Simon Burns and Andrew Crozier
Player of the match: Grace Harris (Brisbane Heat)

- Hobart Hurricanes won the toss and elected to field.
- Broadcast by Cricket Network and Foxtel

Match 25
31 October 2021
10:15
Scorecard

Sydney Thunder; 6/146 (20 overs)	v	Hobart Hurricanes; 8/109 (20 overs)
Smriti Mandhana 50 (50); Nicola Carey 2/36 (4 overs)		Mignon du Preez 41 (39); Deepti Sharma 3/13 (4 overs)

Sydney Thunder won by 37 runs
University of Tasmania Stadium, Launceston
Umpires: Shawn Craig and Roberto Howard
Player of the match: Deepti Sharma (Sydney Thunder)

- Sydney Thunder won the toss and elected to bat.
- Broadcast by Seven Network and Foxtel

Match 29
3 November 2021
10:25
Scorecard

Sydney Sixers; 4/141 (20 overs)	v	Hobart Hurricanes; 7/110 (20 overs)
Ashleigh Gardner 51 (49); Tayla Vlaeminck 1/22 (4 overs)		Rachel Priest 27 (29); Maitlan Brown 2/15 (4 overs)

Sydney Sixers won by 31 runs
WACA Ground, Perth
Umpires: Trent Steenholdt and Dean Trigg
Player of the match: Ashleigh Gardner (Sydney Sixers)

- Hobart Hurricanes won the toss and elected to field.
- Broadcast by Cricket Network and Foxtel

Match 33
6 November 2021
13:50
Scorecard

Hobart Hurricanes; 8/137 (20 overs)	v	Perth Scorchers; 8/135 (20 overs)
Rachel Priest 54 (48); Alana King 2/20 (4 overs)		Chamari Atapattu 33 (31); Nicola Carey 2/17 (4 overs)

Hobart Hurricanes won by 2 runs
WACA Ground, Perth
Umpires: Nathan Johnstone and Dean Trigg
Player of the match: Rachel Priest (Hobart Hurricanes)

- Hobart Hurricanes won the toss and elected to bat.
- Broadcast by Cricket Network and Foxtel

Match 36
7 November 2021
13:50
Scorecard

Hobart Hurricanes; 96 (20 overs)	v	Perth Scorchers; 5/99 (15.3 overs)
Ruth Johnston 38 (40); Marizanne Kapp 4/10 (4 overs)		Chloe Piparo 29 (33); Tayla Vlaeminck 3/21 (4 overs)

Perth Scorchers won by 5 wickets (with 27 balls remaining)
WACA Ground, Perth
Umpires: Jarryd Buscall and Trent Steenholdt
Player of the match: Marizanne Kapp (Perth Scorchers)

- Hobart Hurricanes won the toss and elected to bat.
- Broadcast by Cricket Network and Foxtel

Match 43
13 November 2021
14:40
Scorecard

Adelaide Strikers; 4/142 (20 overs)	v	Hobart Hurricanes; 94 (18.2 overs)
Dane van Niekerk 44 (38); Molly Strano 2/23 (4 overs)		Mignon du Preez 21 (24); Darcie Brown 3/19 (4 overs)

Adelaide Strikers won by 48 runs
Harrup Park, Mackay
Umpires: Steven Farrell and Simon Lightbody
Player of the match: Darcie Brown (Adelaide Strikers)

- Hobart Hurricanes won the toss and elected to field.
- Broadcast by Seven Network and Foxtel
- Hobart Hurricanes were eliminated from finals contention.

Match 49
19 November 2021
14:40
Scorecard

Hobart Hurricanes; 5/161 (20 overs)	v	Melbourne Renegades; 109 (18 overs)
Ruth Johnston 63 (46); Courtney Webb 2/27 (4 overs)		Ellie Falconer 24* (12); Sasha Moloney 3/17 (3 overs)

Hobart Hurricanes won by 52 runs
Harrup Park, Mackay
Umpires: Stephen Dionysius and Nathan James
Player of the match: Ruth Johnston (Hobart Hurricanes)

- Melbourne Renegades won the toss and elected to field.
- Broadcast by Cricket Network and Foxtel

Match 53
20 November 2021
14:40
Scorecard

Hobart Hurricanes; 5/147 (20 overs)	v	Sydney Thunder; 9/143 (20 overs)
Mignon du Preez 87* (61); Samantha Bates 2/22 (4 overs)		Sammy-Jo Johnson 39 (21); Belinda Vakarewa 3/8 (4 overs)

Hobart Hurricanes won by 4 runs
Harrup Park, Mackay
Umpires: Joshua Adie and Stephen Dionysius
Player of the match: Belinda Vakarewa (Hobart Hurricanes)

- Hobart Hurricanes won the toss and elected to bat.
- Broadcast by Cricket Network and Foxtel

== Statistics and awards ==
- Most runs: Mignon du Preez – 414 (7th in the league)
- Highest score in an innings: Rachel Priest – 107* (68) vs Melbourne Stars, 19 October 2021
- Most wickets: Molly Strano – 15 (equal 9th in the league)
- Best bowling figures in an innings: Ruth Johnston – 4/8 (3.2 overs) vs Melbourne Stars, 19 October 2021
- Most catches (fielder): Richa Ghosh, Naomi Stalenberg – 5 each (equal 16th in the league)
- Player of the Match awards:
  - Rachel Priest – 2
  - Mignon du Preez, Ruth Johnston, Belinda Vakarewa – 1 each
- WBBL|07 Player of the Tournament: Mignon du Preez (equal 5th)
- WBBL|07 Team of the Tournament: Tayla Vlaeminck
- Hurricanes Player of the Tournament: Tayla Vlaeminck
