= 2019–20 Hobart Hurricanes WBBL season =

Hobart Hurricanes
2019–20 season
- Coach: Salliann Briggs
- Captain(s): Corinne Hall
- Home ground: Blundstone Arena
- League: WBBL
- Record: 4–9 (7th)
- Finals: DNQ
- Leading Run Scorer: Heather Knight – 282
- Leading Wicket Taker: Belinda Vakarewa – 20
- Player of the Season: Belinda Vakarewa

The 2019–20 Hobart Hurricanes Women's season was the fifth in the team's history. Coached by Salliann Briggs and captained by Corinne Hall, the Hurricanes finished seventh in WBBL|05. They consequently failed to qualify for the finals for the third-consecutive season, but managed to avoid the wooden spoon for the first time since WBBL|02.

== Squad ==
Each 2019–20 squad featured 15 active players, with an allowance of up to five marquee signings including a maximum of three from overseas. Australian marquees are players who held a national women's team contract at the beginning of the WBBL|05 signing period.

Personnel changes made ahead of the season included:

- Nicola Carey signed with the Hurricanes, departing the Sydney Thunder and becoming the team's first Australian marquee player since the retirement of Julie Hunter in 2016–17.
- Maisy Gibson and Belinda Vakarewa signed with the Hurricanes, also departing the Sydney Thunder.
- Tayla Vlaeminck signed with the Hurricanes, departing the Melbourne Renegades.
- Corinne Hall returned to the Hurricanes captaincy role, taking over from Sasha Moloney.
- English marquee Fran Wilson and South African marquee Chloe Tryon signed with the Hurricanes.
- Barbadian marquee Hayley Matthews signed as a replacement player for English marquee Heather Knight in the event of the Hurricanes qualifying for finals, but such a scenario did not eventuate.
- In what was effectively a straight swap with the Perth Scorchers, wicket-keeper Emily Smith joined the Hurricanes in place of the departing Georgia Redmayne.
- On 18 November 2019, Smith was banned for the remainder of WBBL|05 after contravening Cricket Australia's anti-corruption policy with a social media post. Under a special exemption, Emma Manix-Geeves was brought into the Hurricanes squad as a replacement.

The table below lists the Hurricanes players and their key stats (including runs scored, batting strike rate, wickets taken, economy rate, catches and stumpings) for the season.

No.	Name	Nat.	Birth date	Batting style	Bowling style	G	R	SR	W	E	C	S	Notes
Batters
7	Stefanie Daffara	(Australia)	13 June 1995	Right-handed	Right-arm medium	4	14	53.84	–	–	1	–	
3	Erin Fazackerley	(Australia)	3 July 1998	Right-handed	Right-arm medium	13	243	123.97	1	8.00	9	–	
27	Corinne Hall	(Australia)	12 October 1987	Right-handed	Right-arm off spin	13	237	119.69	–	–	2	–	Captain
5	Heather Knight	(England)	26 December 1990	Right-handed	Right-arm off spin	13	282	102.54	6	6.75	5	–	Overseas marquee
99	Sasha Moloney	(Australia)	14 July 1992	Right-handed	Right-arm off spin	4	23	100.00	–	–	1	–	
25	Chloe Tryon	(South Africa)	25 January 1994	Right-handed	Left-arm medium	13	248	178.41	1	7.71	5	–	Overseas marquee
35	Fran Wilson	(England)	7 November 1991	Right-handed	Right-arm off spin	13	210	96.33	–	–	3	–	Overseas marquee
All-rounders
16	Nicola Carey	(Australia)	10 September 1993	Left-handed	Right-arm medium	13	267	96.04	13	7.60	3	–	Australian marquee
50	Hayley Matthews	(Barbados)	19 March 1998	Right-handed	Right-arm off spin	–	–	–	–	–	–	–	Overseas marquee (replacement)
Wicket-keepers
21	Emma Manix-Geeves	(Australia)	12 August 2000	Right-handed	–	5	–	–	–	–	1	1	Replacement player
33	Emily Smith	(Australia)	19 January 1995	Right-handed	–	8	17	94.44	–	–	1	2	
Bowlers
13	Maisy Gibson	(Australia)	14 September 1996	Left-handed	Right-arm leg spin	13	57	91.93	14	7.37	4	–	
12	Brooke Hepburn	(Australia)	4 October 1990	Right-handed	Right-arm medium	–	–	–	–	–	–	–	
10	Meg Phillips	(Australia)	2 February 1996	Right-handed	Right-arm medium	5	38	66.66	2	7.16	0	–	
47	Belinda Vakarewa	(Australia)	22 January 1998	Right-handed	Right-arm fast medium	13	3	100.00	20	6.09	8	–	
30	Tayla Vlaeminck	(Australia)	27 October 1998	Right-handed	Right-arm fast	13	23	121.05	10	6.60	1	–	

== Ladder ==
Pos	Team	Pld	W	L	NR	Pts	NRR
1	Brisbane Heat (C)	14	10	4	0	20	0.723
2	Adelaide Strikers (RU)	14	10	4	0	20	0.601
3	Perth Scorchers	14	9	5	0	18	0.026
4	Melbourne Renegades	14	8	6	0	16	0.117
5	Sydney Sixers	14	7	7	0	14	−0.076
6	Sydney Thunder	14	5	8	1	11	−0.487
7	Hobart Hurricanes	14	4	9	1	9	−0.197
8	Melbourne Stars	14	2	12	0	4	−0.734

- The four top ranked teams qualified for the play-off phase.

== Fixtures ==
All times are local time

Match 2
19 October 2019
14:00
Scorecard

Hobart Hurricanes; 5/164 (20 overs)	v	Melbourne Stars; 9/144 (20 overs)
Chloe Tryon 46* (18); Erin Osborne 2/44 (4 overs)		Erin Osborne 40 (37); Maisy Gibson 3/26 (4 overs)

Hobart Hurricanes won by 20 runs
CitiPower Centre, Melbourne
Umpires: Greg Azzopardi and Daryl Brigham
Player of the match: Belinda Vakarewa (Hobart Hurricanes)

- Melbourne Stars won the toss and elected to field
- Broadcast by Cricket Network

Match 5
20 October 2019
14:10
Scorecard

Melbourne Stars; 7/136 (20 overs)	v	Hobart Hurricanes; 5/137 (18.3 overs)
Lizelle Lee 25 (21); Belinda Vakarewa 2/22 (4 overs)		Nicola Carey 60* (46); Kristen Beams 2/23 (3 overs)

Hobart Hurricanes won by 5 wickets (with 9 balls remaining)
CitiPower Centre, Melbourne
Attendance: 488
Umpires: Dale Ireland and Mattis van Eck
Player of the match: Nicola Carey (Hobart Hurricanes)

- Hobart Hurricanes won the toss and elected to field
- Broadcast by Cricket Network

Match 9
26 October 2019
09:40
Scorecard

Adelaide Strikers; 8/113 (20 overs)	v	Hobart Hurricanes; 7/110 (20 overs)
Sarah Coyte 24 (13); Maisy Gibson 2/15 (4 overs)		Nicola Carey 39 (37); Amanda-Jade Wellington 2/18 (3 overs)

Adelaide Strikers won by 3 runs
Allan Border Field, Brisbane
Umpires: Darren Close and Stephen Dionysius
Player of the match: Sarah Coyte (Adelaide Strikers)

- Hobart Hurricanes won the toss and elected to field
- Broadcast by Seven Network and Fox Cricket

Match 14
27 October 2019
13:10
Scorecard

Hobart Hurricanes; 8/123 (20 overs)	v	Brisbane Heat; 5/124 (19.5 overs)
Heather Knight 61* (49); Jess Jonassen 4/20 (4 overs)		Beth Mooney 44* (50); Nicola Carey, Maisy Gibson 1/18 (4 overs)

Brisbane Heat won by 5 wickets (with 1 ball remaining)
Allan Border Field, Brisbane
Attendance: approx. 1,600
Umpires: Andrew Hamilton and Berend du Plessis
Player of the match: Jess Jonassen (Brisbane Heat)

- Brisbane Heat won the toss and elected to field
- Broadcast by Seven Network and Fox Cricket

Match 17
2 November 2019
14:00
Scorecard

Hobart Hurricanes	v	Sydney Thunder

Match abandoned without a ball bowled
West Park Oval, Burnie
Umpires: Darren Close and G Beechey

- No toss was possible due to rain
- Broadcast by Cricket Network

Match 23
3 November 2019
11:00
Scorecard

Hobart Hurricanes; 6/148 (20 overs)	v	Sydney Thunder; 4/149 (18.1 overs)
Heather Knight 77 (49); Nida Dar 2/16 (4 overs)		Rachel Priest 50 (34); Maisy Gibson 2/28 (4 overs)

Sydney Thunder won by 6 wickets (with 11 balls remaining)
West Park Oval, Burnie
Umpires: Darren Close and Simon Burns
Player of the match: Rachel Priest (Sydney Thunder)

- Sydney Thunder won the toss and elected to field
- Broadcast by Cricket Network

Match 24
9 November 2019
13:00
Scorecard

Hobart Hurricanes; 5/150 (20 overs)	v	Melbourne Renegades; 6/151 (20 overs)
Corinne Hall 50* (34); Sophie Molineux 2/25 (4 overs)		Jess Duffin 75 (49); Belinda Vakarewa 2/21 (4 overs)

Melbourne Renegades won by 4 wickets (with 0 balls remaining)
CitiPower Centre, Melbourne
Umpires: Dale Ireland and Greg Azzopardi
Player of the match: Jess Duffin (Melbourne Renegades)

- Melbourne Renegades won the toss and elected to field
- Broadcast by Cricket Network

Match 28
10 November 2019
13:00
Scorecard

Hobart Hurricanes; 8/108 (20 overs)	v	Melbourne Renegades; 2/109 (15.4 overs)
Heather Knight 20 (24); Molly Strano 3/19 (4 overs)		Danielle Wyatt 45 (44); Belinda Vakarewa 2/16 (4 overs)

Melbourne Renegades won by 8 wickets (with 26 balls remaining)
CitiPower Centre, Melbourne
Umpires: Daryl Brigham and Mattis van Eck
Player of the match: Molly Strano (Melbourne Renegades)

- Melbourne Renegades won the toss and elected to field
- Broadcast by Cricket Network

Match 31
13 November 2019
11:00
Scorecard

Sydney Sixers; 2/172 (20 overs)	v	Hobart Hurricanes; 133 (18 overs)
Ellyse Perry 70* (56); Heather Knight 1/30 (4 overs)		Corinne Hall 31 (22); Erin Burns 3/5 (2 overs)

Sydney Sixers won by 39 runs
Invermay Park, Launceston
Attendance: 1,008
Umpires: G Beechey and Simon Burns
Player of the match: Ellyse Perry (Sydney Sixers)

- Hobart Hurricanes won the toss and elected to field
- Broadcast by Cricket Network

Match 41
20 November 2019
17:30 (D/N)
Scorecard

Sydney Sixers; 7/134 (20 overs)	v	Hobart Hurricanes; 5/139 (18.2 overs)
Marizanne Kapp 55* (40); Belinda Vakarewa 4/19 (4 overs)		Nicola Carey 55* (46); Marizanne Kapp 3/23 (3.2 overs)

Hobart Hurricanes won by 5 wickets (with 10 balls remaining)
North Sydney Oval, Sydney
Umpires: Roberto Howard and Berend du Plessis
Player of the match: Belinda Vakarewa (Hobart Hurricanes)

- Sydney Sixers won the toss and elected to bat
- Broadcast by Cricket Network
- Hobart Hurricanes defeated Sydney Sixers for the first time in WBBL history

Match 42
22 November 2019
19:10 (D/N)
Scorecard

Brisbane Heat; 9/157 (20 overs)	v	Hobart Hurricanes; 7/150 (20 overs)
Grace Harris 43 (27); Belinda Vakarewa 3/17 (4 overs)		Erin Fazackerley 35 (21); Amelia Kerr 2/16 (4 overs)

Brisbane Heat won by 7 runs
Blundstone Arena, Hobart
Umpires: Darren Close and Jeremiah Matibiri
Player of the match: Amelia Kerr (Brisbane Heat)

- Hobart Hurricanes won the toss and elected to field
- Broadcast by Seven Network and Fox Cricket

Match 45
23 November 2019
19:10 (D/N)
Scorecard

Adelaide Strikers; 3/143 (20 overs)	v	Hobart Hurricanes; 7/141 (20 overs)
Suzie Bates 64 (54); Heather Knight 1/22 (4 overs)		Chloe Tryon 44* (22); Amanda-Jade Wellington 3/23 (4 overs)

Adelaide Strikers won by 2 runs
Blundstone Arena, Hobart
Umpires: Troy Penman and Muhammad Qureshi
Player of the match: Suzie Bates (Adelaide Strikers)

- Hobart Hurricanes won the toss and elected to field
- Broadcast by Seven Network and Fox Cricket
- Hobart Hurricanes eliminated from finals contention

Match 52
30 November 2019
14:00
Scorecard

Perth Scorchers; 107 (20 overs)	v	Hobart Hurricanes; 4/113 (15.4 overs)
Nicole Bolton 21 (19); Tayla Vlaeminck 2/19 (4 overs)		Erin Fazackerley 58 (48); Taneale Peschel 2/33 (3.4 overs)

Hobart Hurricanes won by 6 wickets (with 26 balls remaining)
Lilac Hill Park, Perth
Umpires: Dean Trigg and Ashlee Gibbons
Player of the match: Erin Fazackerley (Hobart Hurricanes)

- Hobart Hurricanes won the toss and elected to field
- Broadcast by Cricket Network

Match 56
1 December 2019
14:00
Scorecard

Perth Scorchers; 4/167 (20 overs)	v	Hobart Hurricanes; 6/132 (20 overs)
Meg Lanning 101 (67); Nicola Carey 2/25 (4 overs)		Heather Knight 36 (36); Taneale Peschel 2/22 (4 overs)

Perth Scorchers won by 35 runs
Lilac Hill Park, Perth
Umpires: Dean Trigg and Ashlee Gibbons
Player of the match: Meg Lanning (Perth Scorchers)

- Hobart Hurricanes won the toss and elected to field
- Broadcast by Cricket Network

== Statistics and awards ==
- Most runs: Heather Knight – 282 (20th in the league)
- Highest score in an innings: Heather Knight – 77 (49) vs Sydney Thunder, 3 November
- Most wickets: Belinda Vakarewa – 20 (3rd in the league)
- Best bowling figures in an innings: Belinda Vakarewa – 4/19 (4 overs) vs Sydney Sixers, 20 November
- Most catches (fielder): Erin Fazackerley – 9 (3rd in the league)
- Player of the Match awards:
  - Belinda Vakarewa – 2
  - Nicola Carey, Erin Fazackerley – 1 each
- Hurricanes Player of the Tournament: Belinda Vakarewa
- WBBL|05 Team of the Tournament: Belinda Vakarewa
- WBBL|05 Young Gun Award: Tayla Vlaeminck (nominated)
