= 2020–21 Hobart Hurricanes WBBL season =

Hobart Hurricanes
2020–21 season
- Coach: Salliann Briggs
- Captain(s): Corinne Hall
- League: WBBL
- Record: 3–9 (8th)
- Finals: DNQ
- Leading Run Scorer: Rachel Priest – 354
- Leading Wicket Taker: Hayley Matthews – 12
- Player of the Season: Rachel Priest

The 2020–21 Hobart Hurricanes Women's season was the sixth in the team's history. Coached by Salliann Briggs and captained by Corinne Hall, the Hurricanes played the entirety of WBBL|06 in a bio-secure Sydney hub due to the COVID-19 pandemic. They finished the regular season in last place, resulting in the team's third wooden spoon in four years.

== Squad ==
Each 2020–21 squad was made up of 15 active players. Teams could sign up to five 'marquee players', with a maximum of three of those from overseas. Marquees are classed as any overseas player, or a local player who holds a Cricket Australia national contract at the start of the WBBL|06 signing period.

Personnel changes made ahead of the season included:

- New Zealand marquee Rachel Priest signed with the Hurricanes—her third WBBL team, having previously played for the Sydney Thunder and the Melbourne Renegades.
- Erin Fazackerley departed the Hurricanes, signing with the Melbourne Renegades.
- England marquee Heather Knight departed the Hurricanes, signing with the Sydney Thunder.
- Naomi Stalenberg signed with the Hurricanes, departing the Sydney Thunder.
- New Zealand's Hayley Jensen was added to the Hurricanes squad as a marquee replacement player after Tayla Vlaeminck was ruled out of the season through injury. However, Jensen would still only be eligible to play in the place of a fellow overseas marquee player, if or when required.
- Erica Kershaw signed with the Hurricanes, departing the Melbourne Renegades.
- Chloe Rafferty signed with the Hurricanes, having played with the Melbourne Stars in WBBL|05 as an injury replacement.

The table below lists the Hurricanes players and their key stats (including runs scored, batting strike rate, wickets taken, economy rate, catches and stumpings) for the season.

| No. | Name | Nat. | Birth date | Batting style | Bowling style | G | R | SR | W | E | C | S | Notes |
Batters
| 27 | Corinne Hall | (Australia) | 12 October 1987 | Right-handed | Right-arm off spin | 13 | 79 | 101.28 | – | – | 1 | – | Captain |
| 15 | Erica Kershaw | (Australia) | 23 December 1991 | Left-handed | Right-arm leg spin | 8 | 26 | 50.98 | – | – | 1 | – | |
| 10 | Naomi Stalenberg | (Australia) | 18 April 1994 | Right-handed | Right-arm medium | 13 | 162 | 92.57 | – | – | 4 | – | |
| 74 | Emma Thompson | (Australia) | 12 February 1990 | Right-handed | Right-arm medium | 6 | 61 | 101.66 | – | – | 0 | – | |
| 25 | Chloe Tryon | (South Africa) | 25 January 1994 | Right-handed | Left-arm orthodox | 13 | 164 | 107.89 | 2 | 7.20 | 2 | – | Overseas marquee |
All-rounders
| | Chloe Abel | (Australia) | | Right-handed | Right-arm fast medium | – | – | – | – | – | – | – | Injury replacement |
| 16 | Nicola Carey | (Australia) | 10 September 1993 | Left-handed | Right-arm medium | 13 | 158 | 79.39 | 11 | 6.92 | 7 | – | Australian marquee |
| 50 | Hayley Matthews | (Barbados) | 19 March 1998 | Right-handed | Right-arm off spin | 11 | 128 | 91.42 | 12 | 6.03 | 1 | – | Overseas marquee |
| 99 | Sasha Moloney | (Australia) | 14 July 1992 | Right-handed | Right-arm off spin | 12 | 94 | 87.03 | 3 | 6.59 | 1 | – | |
Wicket-keepers
| 3 | Rachel Priest | (New Zealand) | 13 June 1985 | Right-handed | – | 13 | 354 | 118.00 | – | – | 4 | 3 | Overseas marquee |
| 33 | Emily Smith | (Australia) | 19 January 1995 | Right-handed | – | – | – | – | – | – | – | – | Injury replacement |
Bowlers
| | Nell Bryson-Smith | (Australia) | | | Left-arm orthodox | – | – | – | – | – | – | – | Injury replacement |
| 13 | Maisy Gibson | (Australia) | 14 September 1996 | Left-handed | Right-arm leg spin | – | – | – | – | – | – | – | Unavailable for the season (injury) |
| 12 | Brooke Hepburn | (Australia) | 4 October 1990 | Right-handed | Right-arm medium | 11 | 5 | 27.77 | 4 | 8.16 | 1 | – | |
| 87 | Hayley Jensen | (New Zealand) | 7 October 1992 | Right-handed | Right-arm medium | 2 | 8 | 53.33 | 0 | 7.42 | 0 | – | Overseas marquee (replacement) |
| 7 | Chloe Rafferty | (Australia) | 16 June 1999 | Right-handed | Right-arm fast medium | 3 | 0 | – | 1 | 6.50 | 0 | – | |
| 14 | Amy Smith | (Australia) | 16 November 2004 | Right-handed | Right-arm leg spin | 13 | 31 | 59.61 | 8 | 7.38 | 1 | – | |
| 47 | Belinda Vakarewa | (Australia) | 22 January 1998 | Right-handed | Right-arm fast medium | 12 | 7 | 70.00 | 8 | 6.12 | 4 | – | |
| 30 | Tayla Vlaeminck | (Australia) | 27 October 1998 | Right-handed | Right-arm fast | – | – | – | – | – | – | – | Unavailable for the season (injury) |

== Ladder ==
| Pos | Team | Pld | W | L | NR | Pts | NRR |
|---|---|---|---|---|---|---|---|
| 1 | Melbourne Stars (RU) | 14 | 8 | 3 | 3 | 19 | 0.965 |
| 2 | Brisbane Heat | 14 | 8 | 4 | 2 | 18 | 0.543 |
| 3 | Sydney Thunder (C) | 14 | 7 | 5 | 2 | 16 | 0.344 |
| 4 | Perth Scorchers | 14 | 6 | 6 | 2 | 14 | 0.355 |
| 5 | Sydney Sixers | 14 | 6 | 6 | 2 | 14 | −0.084 |
| 6 | Adelaide Strikers | 14 | 6 | 7 | 1 | 13 | 0.135 |
| 7 | Melbourne Renegades | 14 | 4 | 8 | 2 | 10 | −1.008 |
| 8 | Hobart Hurricanes | 14 | 3 | 9 | 2 | 8 | −1.143 |

- The top 4 teams advance to the play-off phase

== Fixtures ==
All times are local times

Match 2
25 October 2020
10:30
Scorecard

| Hobart Hurricanes; 84 (16.3 overs) | v | Adelaide Strikers; 2/85 (14 overs) |
| Naomi Stalenberg 28 (28); Darcie Brown 3/13 (4 overs) | | Laura Wolvaardt 51* (42); Chloe Tryon 1/13 (3 overs) |

Adelaide Strikers won by 8 wickets (with 36 balls remaining)
Hurstville Oval
Umpires: Muhammad Qureshi and Bede Sajowitz
Player of the match: Laura Wolvaardt (Adelaide Strikers)

- Adelaide Strikers won the toss and elected to field
- Broadcast by Cricket Network

Match 7
26 October 2020
14:30
Scorecard

| Perth Scorchers | v | Hobart Hurricanes |

Match abandoned
Hurstville Oval
Umpires: Simon Lightbody and Bede Sajowitz

- No toss
- No play was possible due to rain
- Broadcast by Cricket Network

Match 11
31 October 2020
15:40
Scorecard

| Brisbane Heat; 2/80 (11 overs) | v | Hobart Hurricanes; 0/43 (4.3 overs) |
| Maddy Green 33 (24); Nicola Carey 1/11 (2 overs) | | Chloe Tryon 26* (15) |

No result
Sydney Showground Stadium
Umpires: Roberto Howard and Greg Davidson

- Hobart Hurricanes won the toss and elected to field
- Match was reduced to 11 overs per side due to rain delay
- Hobart Hurricanes were set a revised target of 106 from 11 overs
- No further play was possible due to rain
- Broadcast by Seven Network and Fox Cricket

Match 16
1 November 2020
14:30
Scorecard

| Hobart Hurricanes; 9/89 (19 overs) | v | Melbourne Stars; 2/93 (11.2 overs) |
| Nicola Carey 26* (37); Katherine Brunt 3/17 (4 overs) | | Elyse Villani 51* (32); Brooke Hepburn 1/6 (1 over) |

Melbourne Stars won by 8 wickets (with 46 balls remaining)
Drummoyne Oval
Umpires: Nathan Johnstone and Stephen Dionysius
Player of the match: Katherine Brunt (Melbourne Stars)

- Melbourne Stars won the toss and elected to field
- Match reduced to 19 overs per side due to rain delay
- Broadcast by Cricket Network

Match 17
3 November 2020
14:30
Scorecard

| Melbourne Renegades; 81 (19.5 overs) | v | Hobart Hurricanes; 1/82 (12.3 overs) |
| Amy Satterthwaite 20 (28); Nicola Carey 3/14 (3.5 overs) | | Naomi Stalenberg 35* (38); Amy Satterthwaite 1/11 (1 over) |

Hobart Hurricanes won by 9 wickets (with 45 balls remaining)
Blacktown International Sportspark
Umpires: Roberto Howard and Jeremiah Matibiri
Player of the match: Nicola Carey (Hobart Hurricanes)

- Hobart Hurricanes won the toss and elected to field
- Broadcast by Fox Cricket and Cricket Network

Match 23
7 November 2020
15:40
Scorecard

| Sydney Sixers; 6/149 (20 overs) | v | Hobart Hurricanes; 8/140 (20 overs) |
| Ashleigh Gardner 53 (35); Hayley Matthews 3/15 (3 overs) | | Nicola Carey 38 (40); Ashleigh Gardner 2/20 (4 overs) |

Sydney Sixers won by 9 runs
North Sydney Oval
Umpires: Muhammad Qureshi and Tony Wilds
Player of the match: Ashleigh Gardner (Sydney Sixers)

- Sydney Sixers won the toss and elected to bat
- Broadcast by Seven Network and Fox Cricket

Match 25
8 November 2020
09:30
Scorecard

| Sydney Thunder; 7/129 (20 overs) | v | Hobart Hurricanes; 7/128 (20 overs) |
| Heather Knight 61* (49); Amy Smith 2/15 (3 overs) | | Rachel Priest 83* (64); Heather Knight 2/12 (3 overs) |

Sydney Thunder won by 1 run
Hurstville Oval
Umpires: Jeremiah Matibiri and Stephen Dionysius
Player of the match: Heather Knight (Sydney Thunder)

- Hobart Hurricanes won the toss and elected to field
- Broadcast by Cricket Network

Match 30
10 November 2020
19:05 (D/N)
Scorecard

| Hobart Hurricanes; 7/143 (20 overs) | v | Melbourne Renegades; 5/134 (20 overs) |
| Rachel Priest 42 (37); Sophie Molineux 2/18 (4 overs) | | Lizelle Lee 38 (31); Hayley Matthews 2/19 (4 overs) |

Hobart Hurricanes won by 9 runs
Blacktown International Sportspark
Umpires: Steven Farrell and Sharad Patel
Player of the match: Hayley Matthews (Hobart Hurricanes)

- Melbourne Renegades won the toss and elected to field
- Broadcast by Fox Cricket and Cricket Network

Match 35
14 November 2020
15:40
Scorecard

| Sydney Sixers; 4/139 (20 overs) | v | Hobart Hurricanes; 1/143 (18.1 overs) |
| Ellyse Perry 72* (68); Amy Smith 2/22 (4 overs) | | Rachel Priest 92* (63) |

Hobart Hurricanes won by 9 wickets (with 11 balls remaining)
Sydney Showground Stadium
Umpires: Greg Davidson and Troy Penman
Player of the match: Rachel Priest (Hobart Hurricanes)

- Sydney Sixers won the toss and elected to bat
- Broadcast by Seven Network and Fox Cricket

Match 38
15 November 2020
14:30
Scorecard

| Hobart Hurricanes; 82 (17.5 overs) | v | Brisbane Heat; 0/86 (11.4 overs) |
| Emma Thompson 19 (21); Jess Jonassen 2/8 (3 overs) | | Georgia Redmayne 61* (33) |

Brisbane Heat won by 10 wickets (with 50 balls remaining)
Drummoyne Oval
Umpires: Eloise Sheridan and Andrew Crozier
Player of the match: Georgia Redmayne (Brisbane Heat)

- Hobart Hurricanes won the toss and elected to bat
- Broadcast by Cricket Network
- Venue changed from Sydney Showground Stadium

Match 41
17 November 2020
09:30
Scorecard

| Adelaide Strikers; 6/141 (20 overs) | v | Hobart Hurricanes; 77 (16.4 overs) |
| Madeline Penna 56* (33); Brooke Hepburn 2/23 (3 overs) | | Chloe Tryon 17 (17); Sarah Coyte 3/10 (3 overs) |

Adelaide Strikers won by 64 runs
Hurstville Oval
Umpires: Troy Penman and Ben Treloar
Player of the match: Madeline Penna (Adelaide Strikers)

- Hobart Hurricanes won the toss and elected to field
- Broadcast by Cricket Network

Match 46
18 November 2020
14:30
Scorecard

| Melbourne Stars; 3/159 (20 overs) | v | Hobart Hurricanes; 8/120 (20 overs) |
| Annabel Sutherland 72 (51); Belinda Vakarewa 2/28 (4 overs) | | Rachel Priest 24 (18); Katherine Brunt 2/12 (4 overs) |

Melbourne Stars won by 39 runs
Hurstville Oval
Umpires: Tony Wilds and Sharad Patel
Player of the match: Annabel Sutherland (Melbourne Stars)

- Hobart Hurricanes won the toss and elected to field
- Broadcast by Cricket Network

Match 51
21 November 2020
15:40
Scorecard

| Hobart Hurricanes; 6/136 (20 overs) | v | Perth Scorchers; 0/140 (14.4 overs) |
| Nicola Carey 36 (31); Samantha Betts 2/24 (4 overs) | | Sophie Devine 87* (53) |

Perth Scorchers won by 10 wickets (with 32 balls remaining)
North Sydney Oval
Umpires: Claire Polosak and Eloise Sheridan
Player of the match: Sophie Devine (Perth Scorchers)

- Perth Scorchers won the toss and elected to field
- Broadcast by Seven Network and Fox Cricket
- Adelaide Strikers, Hobart Hurricanes and Melbourne Renegades were eliminated from finals contention

Match 53
22 November 2020
09:30
Scorecard

| Hobart Hurricanes; 9/115 (20 overs) | v | Sydney Thunder; 4/116 (16.5 overs) |
| Sasha Moloney 39 (38); Shabnim Ismail 3/10 (4 overs) | | Heather Knight 25 (15); Nicola Carey 2/23 (3.5 overs) |

Sydney Thunder won by 6 wickets (with 19 balls remaining)
Drummoyne Oval
Umpires: Steven Farrell and Claire Polosak
Player of the match: Shabnim Ismail (Sydney Thunder)

- Sydney Thunder won the toss and elected to field
- Broadcast by Cricket Network
- Sydney Thunder qualified for finals

== Statistics and awards ==
- Most runs: Rachel Priest – 354 (10th in the league)
- Highest score in an innings: Rachel Priest – 92* (63) vs Sydney Sixers, 14 November
- Most wickets: Hayley Matthews – 12 (equal 15th in the league)
- Best bowling figures in an innings: Nicola Carey – 3/14 (3.5 overs) vs Melbourne Renegades, 3 November
- Most catches: Nicola Carey – 7 (equal 6th in the league)
- Player of the Match awards:
  - Nicola Carey, Hayley Matthews, Rachel Priest – 1 each
- WBBL|06 Young Gun: Amy Smith (week 3 nominee)
- Hurricanes Most Valuable Player: Rachel Priest
