= 2019–20 Melbourne Renegades WBBL season =

Melbourne Renegades
2019–20 season
- Melbourne Renegades 2019–20 cap logo
- Coach: Tim Coyle
- Captain(s): Jess Duffin
- Home ground: CitiPower Centre
- League: WBBL
- Record: 8–6 (4th)
- Finals: Semi-finalists
- Leading Run Scorer: Jess Duffin – 544
- Leading Wicket Taker: Molly Strano – 24
- Player of the Season: Jess Duffin

The 2019–20 Melbourne Renegades Women's season was the fifth in the team's history. Coached by Tim Coyle and captained by Jess Duffin, the Renegades finished the regular season of WBBL|05 in fourth place and qualified for finals. They were subsequently knocked out of the tournament by the defending champions, the Brisbane Heat, in a four-wicket semi-final loss at Allan Border Field.

== Squad ==
Each 2019–20 squad featured 15 active players, with an allowance of up to five marquee signings including a maximum of three from overseas. Australian marquees are players who held a national women's team contract at the time of signing on for their WBBL|05 team.

On 20 August 2019 incumbent captain Amy Satterthwaite announced she would miss the season via maternity leave. Her vacant marquee spot would be filled by Tammy Beaumont, while Jess Duffin was appointed as the team's new captain. Other off-season personnel changes included the loss of quick bowler Tayla Vlaeminck to the Hobart Hurricanes, and the addition of wicket-keeper Josie Dooley from the Brisbane Heat. Despite being ruled out of playing duties, Satterthwaite would continue to contribute off-field in a specialist coaching capacity throughout the WBBL|05 season. Tim Coyle would again return as the team's head coach.

After scoring a T20I century for Sri Lanka against Australia on 29 September, former Renegades batter Chamari Atapattu stated in a post-match press conference she had not been offered a contract for the upcoming Women's Big Bash League season despite her eagerness to participate, underlining the league's fierce competition for overseas marquee selection. However, it was announced on 30 November that Atapattu had signed with the Renegades for their last regular season game and finals. She replaced Tammy Beaumont who would miss out on the WBBL|05 finals due to national team commitments.

Following a season-ending shoulder injury to Claire Koski in a 1 November defeat at the WACA, the W/BBL Technical Committee approved the addition of local replacement player Anna Lanning. On 19 November, it was announced all-rounder Sophie Molineux had requested to take some time away from cricket to focus on her mental health and wellbeing. Coach Tim Coyle said the club would welcome Molineux back for their finals campaign if she made herself available, but such a return did not eventuate.

The table below lists the Renegades players and their key stats (including runs scored, batting strike rate, wickets taken, economy rate, catches and stumpings) for the season.

No.	Name	Nat.	Date of birth	Batting style	Bowling style	G	R	SR	W	E	C	S	Notes
Batters
58	Chamari Atapattu	(Sri Lanka)	9 February 1990	Left-handed	Right-arm off spin	2	21	105.00	0	16.00	0	–	Overseas marquee (replacement)
12	Tammy Beaumont	(England)	11 March 1991	Right-handed	–	13	277	99.64	–	–	3	–	Overseas marquee
25	Makinley Blows	(Australia)	12 December 1997	Left-handed	Right-arm medium	–	–	–	–	–	–	–	
27	Jess Duffin	(Australia)	27 June 1989	Right-handed	Right-arm leg spin	14	544	138.77	–	–	6	–	Captain
55	Claire Koski	(Australia)	13 March 1991	Right-handed	Right-arm medium	5	26	92.85	0	10.00	2	–	
9	Anna Lanning	(Australia)	25 March 1994	Right-handed	Right-arm medium	5	101	118.82	–	–	3	–	Injury replacement
11	Courtney Webb	(Australia)	30 November 1999	Right-handed	Right-arm medium	14	217	97.30	–	–	3	–	
28	Danielle Wyatt	(England)	22 April 1991	Right-handed	Right-arm off spin	14	468	131.83	4	6.94	2	–	Overseas marquee
All-rounders
23	Sophie Molineux	(Australia)	17 January 1998	Left-handed	Left-arm orthodox	10	101	96.19	8	6.87	4	–	Australian marquee
Wicket-keepers
3	Josie Dooley	(Australia)	21 January 2000	Right-handed	–	15	134	105.51	–	–	8	2	
15	Erica Kershaw	(Australia)	23 December 1991	Left-handed	Right-arm leg spin	2	2	66.66	1	9.00	0	–	
Bowlers
77	Maitlan Brown	(Australia)	5 June 1997	Right-handed	Right-arm fast	15	41	110.81	16	7.32	4	–	
74	Carly Leeson	(Australia)	9 November 1998	Right-handed	Right-arm medium	11	24	150.00	3	8.36	4	–	
8	Courtney Neale	(Australia)	4 July 1998	Right-handed	Right-arm medium	–	–	–	–	–	–	–	
5	Molly Strano	(Australia)	5 October 1992	Right-handed	Right-arm off spin	15	1	50.00	24	7.40	1	–	
6	Lea Tahuhu	(New Zealand)	23 September 1990	Right-handed	Right-arm fast	15	0	0.00	9	5.94	1	–	Overseas marquee
32	Georgia Wareham	(Australia)	26 May 1999	Right-handed	Right-arm leg spin	15	94	154.09	7	8.50	8	–	Australian marquee

== Ladder ==
Pos	Team	Pld	W	L	NR	Pts	NRR
1	Brisbane Heat (C)	14	10	4	0	20	0.723
2	Adelaide Strikers (RU)	14	10	4	0	20	0.601
3	Perth Scorchers	14	9	5	0	18	0.026
4	Melbourne Renegades	14	8	6	0	16	0.117
5	Sydney Sixers	14	7	7	0	14	−0.076
6	Sydney Thunder	14	5	8	1	11	−0.487
7	Hobart Hurricanes	14	4	9	1	9	−0.197
8	Melbourne Stars	14	2	12	0	4	−0.734

- The four top ranked teams qualified for the play-off phase.

== Fixtures ==
All times are local time

=== Regular season ===
Match 3
19 October 2019
14:00
Scorecard

Melbourne Renegades; 8/117 (20 overs)	v	Adelaide Strikers; 4/120 (15.2 overs)
Jess Duffin 44 (32); Stafanie Taylor 3/26 (4 overs)		Sophie Devine 72* (45); Maitlan Brown 2/15 (3 overs)

Adelaide Strikers won by 6 wickets (with 28 balls remaining)
Karen Rolton Oval, Adelaide
Umpires: Harry Singh and Craig Thomas
Player of the match: Sophie Devine (Adelaide Strikers)

- Adelaide Strikers won the toss and elected to field
- Broadcast by Cricket Network

Match 7
20 October 2019
14:10
Scorecard

Adelaide Strikers; 5/152 (20 overs)	v	Melbourne Renegades; 5/154 (19 overs)
Sophie Devine 48 (30); Maitlan Brown 2/20 (4 overs)		Danielle Wyatt 61 (37); Sophie Devine 2/32 (4 overs)

Melbourne Renegades won by 5 wickets (with 6 balls remaining)
Karen Rolton Oval, Adelaide
Umpires: Eloise Sheridan and Mary Waldron
Player of the match: Danielle Wyatt (Melbourne Renegades)

- Adelaide Strikers won the toss and elected to bat
- Broadcast by Cricket Network

Match 8
23 October 2019
13:00
Scorecard

Perth Scorchers; 5/132 (20 overs)	v	Melbourne Renegades; 6/133 (19.1 overs)
Natalie Sciver 55* (47); Molly Strano 2/27 (4 overs)		Danielle Wyatt 31 (29); Jemma Barsby 2/22 (3 overs)

Melbourne Renegades won by 4 wickets (with 5 balls remaining)
CitiPower Centre, Melbourne
Umpires: Dale Ireland and Greg Azzopardi
Player of the match: Sophie Molineux (Melbourne Renegades)

- Melbourne Renegades won the toss and elected to field
- Broadcast by Cricket Network

Match 12
26 October 2019
19:00 (D/N)
Scorecard

Sydney Thunder; 8/132 (20 overs)	v	Melbourne Renegades; 8/129 (20 overs)
Rachael Haynes 36 (33); Maitlan Brown 3/22 (4 overs)		Jess Duffin 69 (56); Shabnim Ismail 3/14 (4 overs)

Sydney Thunder won by 3 runs
Blacktown International Sportspark, Sydney
Attendance: 925
Umpires: Roberto Howard and Andrew Hamilton
Player of the match: Shabnim Ismail (Sydney Thunder)

- Melbourne Renegades won the toss and elected to field
- Broadcast by Cricket Network

Match 16
1 November 2019
17:40 (D/N)
Scorecard

Melbourne Renegades; 1/134 (15 overs)	v	Perth Scorchers; 2/77 (7 overs)
Danielle Wyatt 74* (51); Heather Graham 1/23 (3 overs)		Meg Lanning 44* (24); Georgia Wareham 2/13 (1 over)

Perth Scorchers won by 8 wickets (with 0 balls remaining) (D/L method)
WACA Ground, Perth
Umpires: Ashlee Gibbons and Claire Polosak
Player of the match: Meg Lanning (Perth Scorchers)

- Perth Scorchers won the toss and elected to field
- Match reduced to 15 overs per side due to rain delay
- Perth Scorchers' target revised to 73 from 7 overs due to rain delay
- Broadcast by Seven Network and Fox Cricket

Match 18
2 November 2019
12:10
Scorecard

Melbourne Renegades; 8/120 (20 overs)	v	Sydney Sixers; 6/121 (19.5 overs)
Jess Duffin 34* (22); Dane van Niekerk 2/15 (4 overs)		Ellyse Perry 45* (50); Maitlan Brown 2/18 (4 overs)

Sydney Sixers won by 4 wickets (with 1 ball remaining)
WACA Ground, Perth
Umpires: Nathan Johnstone and James Hewitt
Player of the match: Dane van Niekerk (Sydney Sixers)

- Sydney Sixers won the toss and elected to field
- Broadcast by Seven Network and Fox Cricket

Match 24
9 November 2019
13:00
Scorecard

Hobart Hurricanes; 5/150 (20 overs)	v	Melbourne Renegades; 6/151 (20 overs)
Corinne Hall 50* (34); Sophie Molineux 2/25 (4 overs)		Jess Duffin 75 (49); Belinda Vakarewa 2/21 (4 overs)

Melbourne Renegades won by 4 wickets (with 0 balls remaining)
CitiPower Centre, Melbourne
Umpires: Dale Ireland and Greg Azzopardi
Player of the match: Jess Duffin (Melbourne Renegades)

- Melbourne Renegades won the toss and elected to field
- Broadcast by Cricket Network

Match 28
10 November 2019
13:00
Scorecard

Hobart Hurricanes; 8/108 (20 overs)	v	Melbourne Renegades; 2/109 (15.4 overs)
Heather Knight 20 (24); Molly Strano 3/19 (4 overs)		Danielle Wyatt 45 (44); Belinda Vakarewa 2/16 (4 overs)

Melbourne Renegades won by 8 wickets (with 26 balls remaining)
CitiPower Centre, Melbourne
Umpires: Daryl Brigham and Mattis van Eck
Player of the match: Molly Strano (Melbourne Renegades)

- Melbourne Renegades won the toss and elected to field
- Broadcast by Cricket Network

Match 36
17 November 2019
14:10
Scorecard

Sydney Sixers; 4/139 (20 overs)	v	Melbourne Renegades; 8/141 (20 overs)
Marizanne Kapp 52* (34); Lea Tahuhu 2/20 (4 overs)		Danielle Wyatt 55 (43); Erin Burns 2/23 (4 overs)

Melbourne Renegades won by 2 wickets (with 0 balls remaining)
Drummoyne Oval, Sydney
Umpires: Keiran Knight and Simon Lightbody
Player of the match: Courtney Webb (Melbourne Renegades)

- Melbourne Renegades won the toss and elected to field
- Broadcast by Seven Network and Fox Cricket

Requiring 28 runs off the last 12 deliveries with only three wickets in hand, the Renegades pulled off a "great escape" victory against the Sixers through a last-ball six from Courtney Webb against the bowling of Marizanne Kapp. It marked the first time a WBBL team had won a match when needing more than four runs off the final legal delivery. (Note: In a 20 January 2017 match, the Melbourne Stars initially required 6 runs off the last ball but the Hobart Hurricanes conceded a boundary off a no-ball, and the Stars went on to score just one run off the final legal delivery to secure victory. The bowler was Amy Satterthwaite and the on-strike batter was Jess Duffin—two future Renegades captains who would both coincidentally miss the 17 November 2019 game due to pregnancy-related reasons.) The ramifications of the result were season-shaping as the Renegades went on to edge out the Sixers for fourth spot on the ladder, making it the first season the Sixers would fail to qualify for finals.

Match 38
20 November 2019
10:00
Scorecard

Brisbane Heat; 5/153 (20 overs)	v	Melbourne Renegades; 9/147 (20 overs)
Jess Jonassen 63* (29); Georgia Wareham 2/27 (4 overs)		Danielle Wyatt 40 (18); Sammy-Jo Johnson 2/30 (4 overs)

Brisbane Heat won by 6 runs
CitiPower Centre, Melbourne
Umpires: Dale Ireland and Daryl Brigham
Player of the match: Jess Jonassen (Brisbane Heat)

- Melbourne Renegades won the toss and elected to field
- Broadcast by Cricket Network

Match 44
23 November 2019
14:00
Scorecard

Melbourne Renegades; 3/165 (20 overs)	v	Melbourne Stars; 3/169 (19.2 overs)
Anna Lanning 73 (49); Nicola Hancock 2/35 (4 overs)		Lizelle Lee 62 (46); Lea Tahuhu 2/26 (4 overs)

Melbourne Stars won by 7 wickets (with 4 balls remaining)
Eastern Oval, Ballarat
Attendance: 2,337
Umpires: Greg Azzopardi and Daryl Brigham
Player of the match: Anna Lanning (Melbourne Renegades)

- Melbourne Stars won the toss and elected to field
- Broadcast by Cricket Network
- Brisbane Heat qualified for finals

Match 48
27 November 2019
13:10
Scorecard

Brisbane Heat; 4/183 (20 overs)	v	Melbourne Renegades; 4/185 (19 overs)
Beth Mooney 86 (57); Danielle Wyatt 2/26 (3 overs)		Danielle Wyatt 87 (55); Georgia Prestwidge 1/20 (2 overs)

Melbourne Renegades won by 6 wickets (with 6 balls remaining)
Allan Border Field, Brisbane
Umpires: Steven Farrell and Stephen Dionysius
Player of the match: Danielle Wyatt (Melbourne Renegades)

- Melbourne Renegades won the toss and elected to field
- Broadcast by Cricket Network
- Melbourne Renegades set a new record for highest successful run chase in WBBL history

Match 50
30 November 2019
10:40
Scorecard

Melbourne Stars; 4/162 (20 overs)	v	Melbourne Renegades; 4/163 (19.5 overs)
Lizelle Lee 70 (44); Maitlan Brown 2/24 (4 overs)		Jess Duffin 76* (57); Erin Osborne 2/36 (4 overs)

Melbourne Renegades won by 6 wickets (with 1 ball remaining)
CitiPower Centre, Melbourne
Attendance: approx. 1,000
Umpires: Daryl Brigham and Ben Treloar
Player of the match: Jess Duffin (Melbourne Renegades)

- Melbourne Renegades won the toss and elected to field
- Broadcast by Seven Network and Fox Cricket
- Sydney Thunder eliminated from finals contention

Match 53
1 December 2019
10:40
Scorecard

Melbourne Renegades; 6/151 (20 overs)	v	Sydney Thunder; 7/122 (20 overs)
Jess Duffin 53 (44); Samantha Bates 3/21 (4 overs)		Naomi Stalenberg 28 (30); Molly Strano 3/26 (4 overs)

Melbourne Renegades won by 29 runs
CitiPower Centre, Melbourne
Umpires: Claire Polosak and Mattis van Eck
Player of the match: Molly Strano (Melbourne Renegades)

- Sydney Thunder won the toss and elected to field
- Broadcast by Seven Network and Fox Cricket
- Melbourne Renegades qualified for finals, Sydney Sixers eliminated from finals contention
- Former Australian players Alex Blackwell and Rene Farrell made their last WBBL appearances

=== Knockout phase ===
Semi-final 2
7 December 2019
13:50
Scorecard

Melbourne Renegades; 4/163 (20 overs)	v	Brisbane Heat; 6/165 (18 overs)
Josephine Dooley 50* (42); Jess Jonassen 1/25 (4 overs)		Maddy Green 46 (29); Molly Strano 4/28 (4 overs)

Brisbane Heat won by 4 wickets (with 12 balls remaining)
Allan Border Field, Brisbane
Attendance: 2,031
Umpires: Claire Polosak and Ben Treloar
Player of the match: Jess Jonassen (Brisbane Heat)

- Brisbane Heat won the toss and elected to field
- Broadcast by Seven Network and Fox Cricket

In the first-ever semi-final encounter between the two teams, the Renegades batted first and were slow out of the blocks to be down 2/59 in the ninth over. An ensuing 80-run partnership from 58 balls between Josie Dooley and Jess Duffin ended when the latter was stumped by Beth Mooney off the bowling of Jess Jonassen. A quickfire cameo of 22 off 8 by Georgia Wareham finished the innings promisingly while Dooley, having won a championship with the Heat in the previous season, top-scored for the Renegades with 50 not out. The Heat top-order batters of Maddy Green, Jess Jonassen and Grace Harris then "produced fireworks," collectively scoring 126 runs while only facing 79 balls. Molly Strano picked up wickets throughout the second innings, although Brisbane only required 15 runs with 27 balls remaining by the time she claimed her (and the Renegades') fourth. Despite a mini-collapse late in the chase, the Heat hauled in the target of 164 with a comfortable buffer of twelve balls to spare, knocking the Renegades out of the tournament.

== Statistics and awards ==
- Most runs: Jess Duffin – 544 (3rd in the league)
- Highest score in an innings: Danielle Wyatt – 87 (55) vs Brisbane Heat, 27 November
- Most wickets: Molly Strano – 24 (1st in the league)
- Best bowling figures in an innings: Molly Strano – 4/28 (4 overs) vs Brisbane Heat, 7 December
- Most catches (fielder): Georgia Wareham – 8 (4th in the league)
- Player of the Match awards:
  - Jess Duffin, Molly Strano, Danielle Wyatt – 2 each
  - Anna Lanning, Sophie Molineux, Courtney Webb – 1 each
- Renegades Player of the Season: Jess Duffin
- WBBL|05 Player of the Tournament: Danielle Wyatt (3rd), Jess Duffin (equal 4th)
- WBBL|05 Team of the Tournament: Jess Duffin (captain), Molly Strano, Danielle Wyatt
- WBBL|05 Young Gun Award: Courtney Webb (nominated)
