= 2024–25 Hobart Hurricanes WBBL season =

Hobart Hurricanes
2024–25 season
- Coach: Jude Coleman
- Captain(s): Elyse Villani
- Home ground: Bellerive Oval
- T20 Spring Challenge: Winners

The 2024–25 Hobart Hurricanes Women's season was the 10th season of the Women's Big Bash League. Coached by Jude Coleman and captained by Elyse Villani. They finished at the 6th place in the previous season's League stage.

The Hurricanes finished the regular season of WBBL Season 10 in fourth place and qualified for the finals. They were eliminated from the knockout phase of the tournament, losing to the Sydney Thunder in the Eliminator.

== Squad ==
Personnel changes made ahead of the season included:

- Lauren Smith signed with the Hurricanes, having previously played for Sydney Thunder
- Callie Wilson and Zoe Cooke both signed with the Hurricanes
- The Hurricanes signed Danni Wyatt-Hodge and Chloe Tryon in the overseas player draft. Tyron previously played with the Hurricanes in WBBL|5 and WBBL|6.
- Overseas players Shabnim Ismail and Bryony Smith were not retained in the draft
- Maisy Gibson departed the Hurricanes, signing with Melbourne Stars
- Naomi Stalenberg departed the Hurricanes, signing with Melbourne Renegades
- The Hurricanes signed two overseas replacement players, Suzie Bates and Rosemary Mair
- Jude Coleman was appointed head coach, replacing Dan Marsh

The table below lists the Hurricanes squad.

- Players with international caps are listed in **bold**.

No.	Name	Nationality	Birth date	Batting style	Bowling style	Notes
Batters
51	Tabatha Saville	Australia	13 April 1998	Right-handed	Right-arm medium	
10	~~Rachel Trenaman~~	Australia	18 April 2001	Right-handed	Right-arm leg spin	Injured – out for the season
2	**Elyse Villani**	Australia	6 October 1989	Right-handed	Right-arm medium	Captain
22	**Danni Wyatt-Hodge**	England	22 April 1991	Right-handed	Right-arm off spin	Overseas player
All-rounders
9	**Suzie Bates**	New Zealand	16 September 1987	Right-handed	Right-arm medium	Overseas Replacement Player
73	**Kathryn Bryce**	Scotland	17 November 1997	Right-handed	Right-arm medium	Overseas ICC Associate Player
16	**Nicola Carey**	(Australia)	10 September 1993	Left-handed	Right-arm medium	
11	**Heather Graham**	Australia	10 May 1996	Right-handed	Right-arm medium	Australia central contract
28	Ruth Johnston	Australia	28 February 2003	Right-handed	Right-arm off spin	
25	**Chloe Tryon**	South Africa	25 January 1994	Right-handed	Slow left-arm orthodox	Overseas player
Wicket-keeper
67	**Lizelle Lee**	South Africa	2 April 1992	Right-handed	Right-arm medium	Overseas player
Pace bowlers
15	Zoe Cooke	Australia	17 September 1995	Right-handed	Right-arm medium fast	
4	~~Hayley Silver-Holmes~~	(Australia)	18 August 2003	Right-handed	Right-arm medium fast	Injured – out for the Season
7	**Rosemary Mair**	(New Zealand)	7 November 1998	Right-handed	Right-arm medium fast	Overseas Replacement Player
5	Callie Wilson	Australia		Right-handed	Right-arm medium fast	
Spin bowlers
14	Amy Smith	Australia	16 November 2004	Right-handed	Right-arm leg spin	
6	Lauren Smith	Australia	6 October 1996	Right-handed	Right-arm off spin	
26	**Molly Strano**	Australia	5 October 1992	Right-handed	Right-arm off spin	

== Standing ==
Pos	Team	Pld	W	L	T	NR	Pts	NRR	
1	Melbourne Renegades (C)	10	7	3	0	0	14	0.527	Advance to the play-off phase
2	Brisbane Heat (R)	10	7	3	0	0	14	0.384	Advance to the play-off phase
3	Sydney Thunder (3rd)	10	6	3	0	1	13	−0.002	Advance to the play-off phase
4	Hobart Hurricanes (4th)	10	5	5	0	0	10	0.189	Advance to the play-off phase
5	Perth Scorchers	10	4	5	1	0	9	−0.171	
6	Sydney Sixers	10	3	5	1	1	8	−0.477	
7	Adelaide Strikers	10	3	6	0	1	7	−0.357	
8	Melbourne Stars	10	2	7	0	1	5	−0.205	

Source: ESPNcricinfo
(C) Champions; (R) Runners-up
