= De Vlaeminck =

De Vlaeminck is a surname. Notable people with the surname include:

- Erik De Vlaeminck (1945–2015), Belgian cyclist
- Roger De Vlaeminck (born 1947), Belgian cyclist, brother of Erik

== See also ==
- Tayla Vlaeminck (born 1998), Australian cricketer
