= Stefanie Daffara =

Australian cricketer

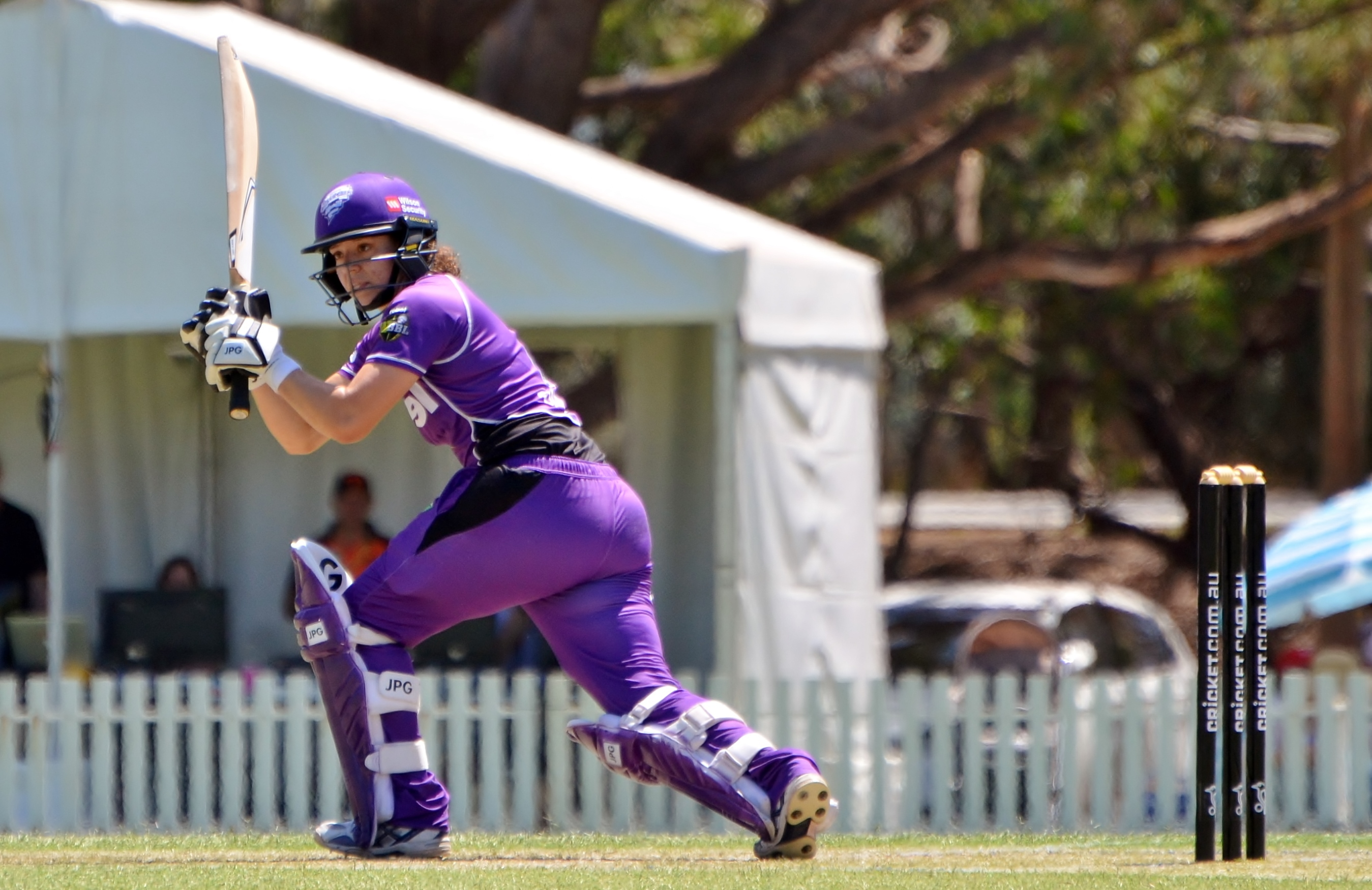
Daffara in action for the Hobart Hurricanes.

Stefanie Daffara (born 13 June 1995) is an Australian cricketer. She plays for the Hobart Hurricanes in the Women's Big Bash League and for the Tasmanian Tigers in the Women's National Cricket League.
