= 2021–22 Women's Ashes series =

International cricket tour

	Australia women	England women
- Dates: 20 January – 8 February 2022
Captains	Meg Lanning	Heather Knight
- Player of the series: Tahlia McGrath (Aus)

Test series
- Result: 1-match series drawn 0–0
Most runs	Meg Lanning (105)	Heather Knight (216)
Most wickets	Annabel Sutherland (5)	Katherine Brunt (8)

One Day International series
- Results: Australia women won the 3-match series 3–0
Most runs	Alyssa Healy (91)	Nat Sciver (99)
Most wickets	Tahlia McGrath (6)	Kate Cross (5)

Twenty20 International series
- Results: Australia women won the 3-match series 1–0
Most runs	Tahlia McGrath (91)	Danni Wyatt (84)
Most wickets	Tahlia McGrath (3)	Sophie Ecclestone (1)

Total Ashes points
- Australia women 12, England women 4

The England women's cricket team played against Australia women's cricket team in January and February 2022 to contest the Women's Ashes. The tour consisted of one Women's Test match, three Women's One Day Internationals (WODIs), and three Women's Twenty20 Internationals (WT20Is). A points-based system was used across all three formats of the tour. Australia were the defending champions, after they won the previous series 12–4 in the points-based system. On 17 January 2022, it was announced that the Decision Review System (DRS) would be used for the first time in the Women's Ashes.

As well as the international matches, the respective A teams also played three 20-over and three limited overs matches against each other. On 21 July 2021, Cricket Australia confirmed the fixtures for the A team matches. It was the first time that the England A women's team toured Australia with the England women's team. On 6 January 2022, the tour schedule was brought forward by one week, due to the quarantine requirements in New Zealand for the 2022 Women's Cricket World Cup.

Australia won the opening WT20I match by nine wickets, with Tahlia McGrath making an unbeaten 91 runs and taking three wickets. The next two WT20I matches were both impacted by the weather, with only 4.1 overs being bowled in the second match, and no play at all taking place in the third. Therefore, Australia took a 4–2 lead in the points-based system going into the one-off Women's Test match.

The one-off Test match was drawn, after England were set a target of 257 from 48 overs to win on the final day. Described as one of the best Test matches in women's cricket, England required 45 runs to win from ten overs with seven wickets remaining. England finished the match with 245 runs for the loss of nine wickets, just twelve runs short of victory. England captain Heather Knight was named the player of the match for her century in the first innings and match aggregate of 216 runs, with Australia leading the points-based system 6–4 heading into the WODI matches.

Australia won the first WODI match by 27 runs, taking an unassailable lead in the points-based system and retaining the Women's Ashes. Australia won the final two WODI matches, to remain unbeaten during the series, and finished the tour 12–4 winners on points. Australia's Tahlia McGrath was named the Player of the Series, after scoring 225 runs and taking 11 wickets.

== Squads ==
Ashes		A Team	
Australia	England	Australia A	England A
Meg Lanning (c); Rachael Haynes (vc); Darcie Brown; Stella Campbell; Nicola Carey; Hannah Darlington; Grace Harris; Ashleigh Gardner; Alyssa Healy (wk); Jess Jonassen; Alana King; Tahlia McGrath; Beth Mooney; Ellyse Perry; Megan Schutt; Annabel Sutherland; Tayla Vlaeminck	Heather Knight (c); Nat Sciver (vc); Tammy Beaumont; Lauren Bell; Maia Bouchier; Katherine Brunt; Kate Cross; Freya Davies; Charlie Dean; Sophia Dunkley; Sophie Ecclestone; Tash Farrant; Sarah Glenn; Amy Jones (wk); Emma Lamb; Anya Shrubsole; Mady Villiers; Lauren Winfield-Hill; Danni Wyatt	Georgia Redmayne (c); Maitlan Brown; Erin Burns; Stella Campbell; Hannah Darlington; Nicole Faltum; Tess Flintoff; Heather Graham; Grace Harris; Phoebe Litchfield; Katie Mack; Courtney Sippel; Molly Strano; Elyse Villani; Georgia Voll; Courtney Webb; Amanda-Jade Wellington	Emily Arlott; Lauren Bell; Alice Capsey; Alice Davidson-Richards; Charlie Dean; Georgia Elwiss; Tash Farrant; Kirstie Gordon; Evelyn Jones; Beth Langston; Emma Lamb; Bryony Smith; Anya Shrubsole; Eleanor Threlkeld; Mady Villiers; Issy Wong

Ahead of the series, Australia's Beth Mooney suffered a fractured jaw in a training session. As a result, Grace Harris was added to the Australia's Ashes squad, and Courtney Webb was added to the Australia A squad. For the opening A team match, Ashes squad members Hannah Darlington represented Australia A, and Charlie Dean, Tash Farrant, Anya Shrubsole and Mady Villiers all represented England A. On 23 January 2022, Australia's Tayla Vlaeminck was ruled out of the rest of the series due to a stress fracture in her right foot. Two days later, as a result of Vlaeminck's injury, Stella Campbell was added to Australia's squad ahead of the one-off Test match. On the same day, Lauren Bell was added to England's squad for the Test match. Emma Lamb was added to England's WODI squad from the A Team for the final match of the tour.

== Warm-up matches ==
15 January 2022
Scorecard

England; 6/193 (35 overs)	v	England A 183 (34.2 overs)
Nat Sciver 71 (71); Lauren Bell 3/35 (6 overs)		Eleanor Threlkeld 44 (34); Sophie Ecclestone 3/24 (6 overs)

England Women won by 10 runs
Phillip Oval, Canberra

- No toss.

16 January 2022
Scorecard

England A 9/143 (20 overs)	v	England; 103 (17.1 overs)
Emma Lamb 48 (32); Sophie Ecclestone 7/14 (4 overs)		Heather Knight 35 (21); Kirstie Gordon 3/19 (4 overs)

England A Women won by 40 runs
Phillip Oval, Canberra

- No toss.

16 January 2022
Scorecard

England; 9/125 (20 overs)	v	England A 6/130 (19.2 overs)
Nat Sciver 33 (26); Georgia Elwiss 2/27 (4 overs)		Maia Bouchier 27 (28); Sophie Ecclestone 2/17 (4 overs)

England A Women won by 4 wickets
Phillip Oval, Canberra

- No toss.

== Tour matches ==
=== 20-over matches ===
20 January 2022
11:00
Scorecard

England A 129 (20 overs)	v	Australia A 7/133 (19.3 overs)
Alice Capsey 44 (31); Heather Graham 4/13 (3.5 overs)		Georgia Voll 42 (45); Lauren Bell 3/17 (4 overs)

Australia A Women won by 3 wickets
Karen Rolton Oval, Adelaide
Umpires: Dhaval Bhatt (Aus) and Nathan Johnstone (Aus)
Player of the match: Heather Graham (Aus)

- Australia A Women won the toss and elected to field.

21 January 2022
15:00
Scorecard

England A 4/150 (20 overs)	v	Australia A 0/151 (17.3 overs)
Emma Lamb 52* (43); Amanda-Jade Wellington 2/22 (4 overs)		Elyse Villani 94* (63)

Australia A Women won by 10 wickets
Karen Rolton Oval, Adelaide
Umpires: Dhaval Bhatt (Aus) and Lisa McCabe (Aus)
Player of the match: Elyse Villani (Aus)

- England A Women won the toss and elected to bat.

23 January 2022
10:00
Scorecard

England A 7/158 (20 overs)	v	Australia A 0/3 (0.5 overs)
Emma Lamb 57 (31); Courtney Sippel 1/29 (4 overs)		Annabel Sutherland 1* (2)

No result
Karen Rolton Oval, Adelaide
Umpires: Nathan Johnstone (Aus) and Lisa McCabe (Aus)

- Australia A Women won the toss and elected to field.
- No further play was possible due to rain.

=== 50-over matches ===
28 January 2022
10:00
Scorecard

Australia A 9/261 (50 overs)	v	England A 219 (46.1 overs)
Phoebe Litchfield 54 (78); Sarah Glenn 3/52 (8 overs)		Alice Davidson-Richards 72 (86); Molly Strano 2/27 (8 overs)

Australia A Women won by 42 runs
Phillip Oval, Canberra
Umpires: Nathan Johnstone (Aus) and Simon Lightbody (Aus)
Player of the match: Molly Strano (Aus)

- England A Women won the toss and elected to field.

30 January 2022
10:00
Scorecard

England A 132 (45.2 overs)	v	Australia A 2/138 (26.2 overs)
Tash Farrant 26 (49); Heather Graham 3/13 (7.2 overs)		Elyse Villani 48* (50); Emily Arlott 1/14 (3 overs)

Australia A Women won by 8 wickets
Phillip Oval, Canberra
Umpires: Nathan Johnstone (Aus) and Simon Lightbody
Player of the match: Amanda-Jade Wellington (Aus)

- Australia A Women won the toss and elected to field.

2 February 2022
10:00
Scorecard

Australia A 8/263 (50 overs)	v	England A 211 (45.1 overs)
Phoebe Litchfield 76 (98); Alice Davidson-Richards 1/20 (4 overs)		Maia Bouchier 51 (54); Courtney Sippel 4/31 (9.1 overs)

Australia A Women won by 52 runs
Phillip Oval, Canberra
Umpires: Nathan Johnstone (Aus) and Simon Lightbody
Player of the match: Courtney Sippel (Aus)

- England A Women won the toss and elected to field.

== WT20I series ==
=== 1st WT20I ===
20 January 2022
18:40 (N)
Scorecard

England; 4/169 (20 overs)	v	Australia; 1/170 (17 overs)
Danni Wyatt 70 (54); Tahlia McGrath 3/26 (4 overs)		Tahlia McGrath 91* (49); Sophie Ecclestone 1/29 (4 overs)

Australia Women won by 9 wickets
Adelaide Oval, Adelaide
Umpires: Bruce Oxenford (Aus) and Claire Polosak (Aus)
Player of the match: Tahlia McGrath (Aus)

- Australia Women won the toss and elected to field.
- Alana King (Aus) made her WT20I debut.
- Meg Lanning became the first cricketer for Australia to score 3,000 runs in WT20Is.
- Ashes points: Australia Women 2, England Women 0.

=== 2nd WT20I ===
22 January 2022
13:40
Scorecard

England; 0/25 (4.1 overs)	v	Australia
Danni Wyatt 14* (12)

No result
Adelaide Oval, Adelaide
Umpires: Michael Graham-Smith (Aus) and Bruce Oxenford (Aus)

- Australia Women won the toss and elected to field.
- No further play was possible due to rain.
- Charlie Dean (Eng) made her WT20I debut.
- Ashes points: Australia Women 1, England Women 1.

=== 3rd WT20I ===
23 January 2022
13:40
Scorecard

Australia	v	England

Match abandoned
Adelaide Oval, Adelaide
Umpires: Claire Polosak (Aus) and Eloise Sheridan (Aus)

- No toss.
- No play was possible due to rain.
- Ashes points: Australia Women 1, England Women 1.

== Only WTest ==
27–30 January 2022
Scorecard

Australia	v	England
9/337d (104.1 overs); Meg Lanning 93 (170); Katherine Brunt 5/60 (21.1 overs)		297 (105.5 overs); Heather Knight 168* (294); Ellyse Perry 3/57 (20.5 overs)
7/216d (64 overs); Beth Mooney 63 (137); Katherine Brunt 3/24 (9 overs)		9/245 (48 overs); Nat Sciver 58 (62); Annabel Sutherland 3/69 (13 overs)

Match drawn
Manuka Oval, Canberra
Umpires: Michael Graham-Smith (Aus) and Eloise Sheridan (Aus)
Player of the match: Heather Knight (Eng)

- England Women won the toss and elected to field.
- No play was possible after lunch on day 3 due to rain.
- Alana King (Aus) and Charlie Dean (Eng) both made their Test debuts.
- Meg Lanning captained Australia for the 150th time in international cricket.
- Ellyse Perry (Aus) became the leading run-scorer and wicket-taker in the Women's Ashes, with 1,552 runs and 68 wickets respectively.
- Ashes points: Australia Women 2, England Women 2.

== WODI series ==
=== 1st WODI ===
3 February 2022
14:10 (D/N)
Scorecard

Australia; 9/205 (50 overs)	v	England; 178 (45 overs)
Beth Mooney 73 (91); Kate Cross 3/33 (10 overs)		Nat Sciver 45 (66); Darcie Brown 4/34 (10 overs)

Australia Women won by 27 runs
Manuka Oval, Canberra
Umpires: Michael Graham-Smith (Aus) and Claire Polosak (Aus)
Player of the match: Beth Mooney (Aus)

- England Women won the toss and elected to field.
- Alana King (Aus) made her WODI debut.
- Megan Schutt (Aus) took her 100th wicket in WODIs.
- Australia retained the Ashes as a result of this match.
- Ashes points: Australia Women 2, England Women 0.

=== 2nd WODI ===
6 February 2022
10:05
Scorecard

England; 129 (45.2 overs)	v	Australia; 5/131 (35.2 overs)
Sophie Ecclestone 32* (65); Tahlia McGrath 3/4 (3.2 overs)		Ellyse Perry 40 (64); Kate Cross 2/46 (8 overs)

Australia Women won by 5 wickets
Junction Oval, Melbourne
Umpires: Bruce Oxenford (Aus) and Eloise Sheridan (Aus)
Player of the match: Ellyse Perry (Aus)

- Australia Women won the toss and elected to field.
- Australia won the Ashes as a result of this match.
- Ashes points: Australia Women 2, England Women 0.

=== 3rd WODI ===
8 February 2022
10:05
Scorecard

England; 163 (49.3 overs)	v	Australia; 2/164 (36.2 overs)
Tammy Beaumont 50 (101); Annabel Sutherland 4/31 (9 overs)		Meg Lanning 57* (70); Sophie Ecclestone 1/18 (10 overs)

Australia Women won by 8 wickets
Junction Oval, Melbourne
Umpires: Claire Polosak (Aus) and Eloise Sheridan (Aus)
Player of the match: Annabel Sutherland (Aus)

- England Women won the toss and elected to bat.
- Emma Lamb (Eng) made her WODI debut.
- Ashes points: Australia Women 2, England Women 0.
