= Meg Phillips =

Australian cricketer

Personal information
- Full name: Meg Ellen Phillips
- Born: 2 February 1996 (age 30); Sunshine, Victoria, Australia
- Batting: Right-handed
- Bowling: Right-arm medium
- Role: All-rounder

Domestic team information
- Years: Team
- 2011/12–2020/21: Tasmania
- 2015: Lancashire
- 2015/16–2019/20: Hobart Hurricanes (squad no. 10)

Career statistics
Competition	WLA	WT20
Matches	48	61
Runs scored	630	214
Batting average	14.65	7.92
100s/50s	0/2	0/0
Top score	68	25*
Balls bowled	1,116	470
Wickets	30	26
Bowling average	32.16	22.11
5 wickets in innings	0	0
10 wickets in match	0	0
Best bowling	4/16	3/16
Catches/stumpings	12/–	15/–
- Source: CricketArchive, 21 March 2021

Meg Ellen Phillips (born 2 February 1996) is an Australian cricketer who played as an all-rounder for Tasmanian Tigers and Hobart Hurricanes. She has also played county cricket for Lancashire, and semi-professional basketball for Launceston Tornadoes.

From Evandale in northern Tasmania, Phillips was educated at Scotch Oakburn College in Launceston. She made her debut for Tasmanian Roar as a 16 year old against the ACT Meteors in 2011. At that time, she was one of the youngest cricketers playing in an Australian senior cricket team.

In January 2012, Phillips captained the Tasmanian team in the Cricket Australia Under-18 Female Championships at Ballarat in Victoria. Also in 2012, she was named young female cricketer of the year. In March 2013, she debuted for Scotch Oakburn College's senior firsts cricket team, and was said to be the first female ever to have played in the SATIS (Sports Association of Tasmanian Independent Schools) cricket competition. She again captained the Tasmanian female under-18 team in 2013–14.

During the winter of 2014, Phillips spent two weeks at the National Training Centre in Brisbane. The ensuing 2014–15 season was Phillips' best for the Roar to date, and included a score of 68 off 109 balls, batting at the top of the order against the Meteors.

In February 2015, Phillips was awarded an Adam Gilchrist Scholarship, funded by the Lord's Taverners, to travel overseas for the first time and play county cricket for Lancashire. Soon after arriving in the UK, she became the first female to play in the First Division of the North Manchester Cricket League when she debuted for Tottington St John's in a local derby match against East Lancs Paper Mill. In November 2015, after returning to Australia for the 2015–16 season, she took 4-16 and scored 20 runs in a WNCL match against the Western Fury.

Phillips was signed by the Hurricanes for its inaugural WBBL|01 season (2015–16). She remained in the Hurricanes squad for the WBBL|02 season (2016–17). In November 2018, she was named in the Hobart Hurricanes' squad for the 2018–19 Women's Big Bash League season.

On 11 June 2021, it was confirmed that Phillips had not received a Tasmania contract for the 2021–22 WNCL season.
