= Chloe Rafferty =

Australian cricketer (born 1999)

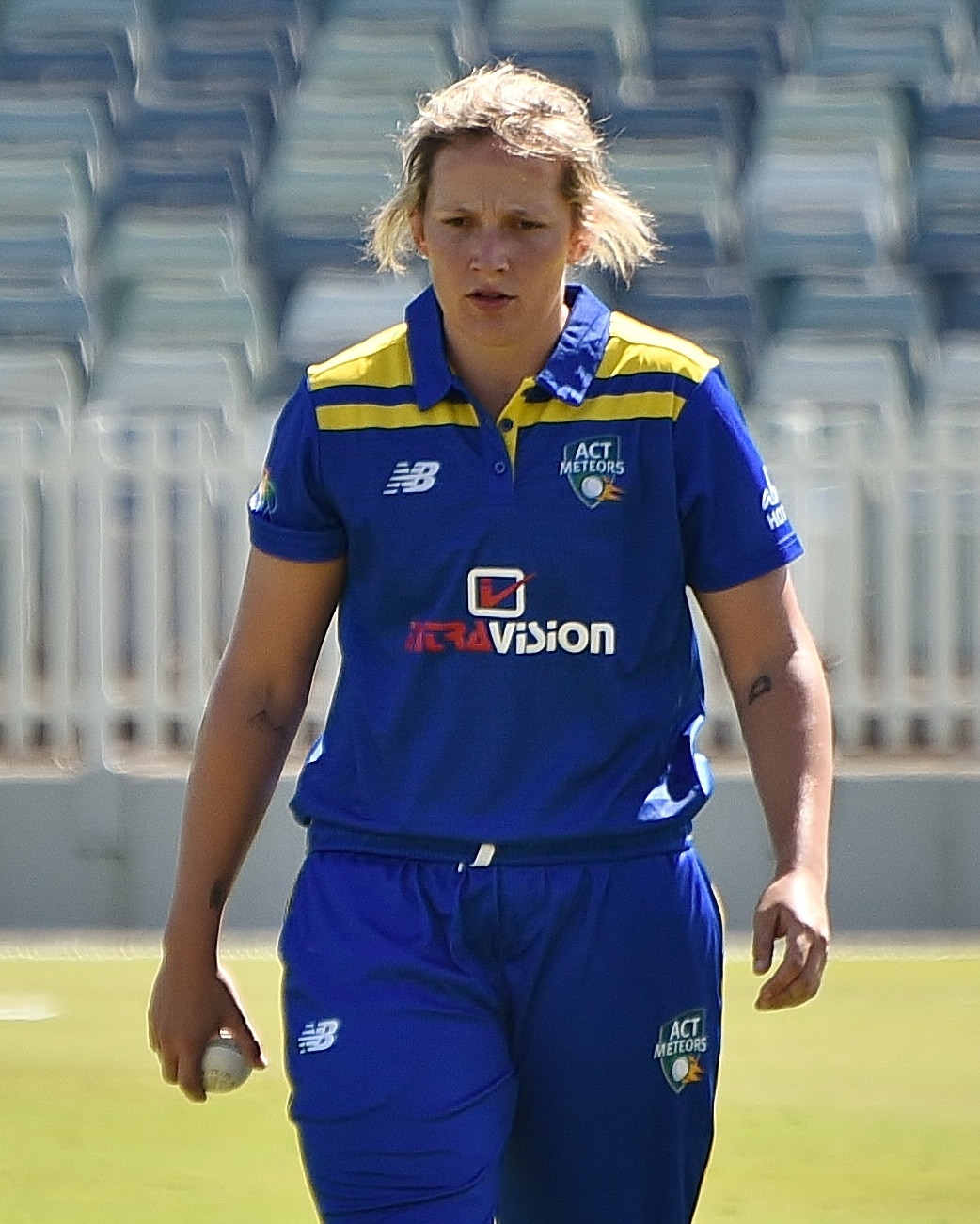
- Rafferty playing for the ACT in September 2022

Personal information
- Full name: Chloe Lee Rafferty
- Born: 16 June 1999 (age 27); Williamstown, Victoria, Australia
- Batting: Right-handed
- Bowling: Right-arm medium
- Role: Bowler

Domestic team information
- Years: Team
- 2017/18–2019/20: Victoria
- 2017/18–2019/20: Melbourne Stars
- 2020/21–2021/22: Hobart Hurricanes
- 2020/21–present: Australian Capital Territory

Career statistics
Competition	WLA	WT20
Matches	35	11
Runs scored	194	6
Batting average	10.75	6.00
100s/50s	0/0	0/0
Top score	37	6
Balls bowled	826	96
Wickets	16	2
Bowling average	44.38	69.50
5 wickets in innings	0	0
10 wickets in match	0	0
Best bowling	3/16	1/21
Catches/stumpings	4/–	1/–
- Source: CricketArchive, 26 March 2021

Chloe Lee Rafferty (born 16 June 1999) is an Australian cricketer who plays as a right-arm medium pace bowler and right-handed batter for the ACT Meteors in the Women's National Cricket League. She played in three matches for the Hurricanes in the 2020–21 WBBL season and six matches for the Meteors in the 2020–21 WNCL season. She previously played for the Melbourne Stars and Victoria.
