= Emma Thompson (cricketer) =

Australian cricketer (born 1990)

Personal information
- Full name: Emma Elizabeth Thompson
- Born: 2 December 1990 (age 35); Baulkham Hills, New South Wales, Australia
- Batting: Right-handed
- Bowling: Right-arm medium
- Role: Batter

Domestic team information
- Years: Team
- 2009/10–2022/23: Tasmania
- 2015/16–2018/19: Hobart Hurricanes (squad no. 74)
- 2020/21: Hobart Hurricanes (squad no. 74)

Career statistics
| Competition | WLA | WT20 |
|---|---|---|
| Matches | 62 | 99 |
| Runs scored | 912 | 988 |
| Batting average | 15.45 | 14.31 |
| 100s/50s | 0/4 | 0/1 |
| Top score | 70 | 56* |
| Balls bowled | 676 | 366 |
| Wickets | 12 | 17 |
| Bowling average | 60.83 | 26.05 |
| 5 wickets in innings | 0 | 0 |
| 10 wickets in match | 0 | 0 |
| Best bowling | 2/43 | 2/14 |
| Catches/stumpings | 23/– | 13/– |
- Source: CricketArchive, 21 March 2021

Emma Elizabeth Thompson (born 2 December 1990) is an Australian former cricketer who played as a right-handed batter and occasional right-arm medium bowler for the Tasmanian Tigers in the Women's National Cricket League (WNCL). Originally from Sydney, Thompson played for several years in the New South Wales U17 ("Under 17") and U19 squads. She then sought further opportunities in Tasmania, where she became a key player for Tasmania.

Thompson was included in the Hobart Hurricanes squad for its inaugural WBBL|01 season (2015–16), and was again selected for the WBBL|02 season (2016–17). She is not one of the big guns in the WBBL, and sometimes plays essentially as a specialist fielder, a role she accepts without rancour. In November 2018, she was named in the Hobart Hurricanes' squad for the 2018–19 Women's Big Bash League season.

Off the field, Thompson works as a physiotherapist.
