= Amy Smith (cricketer) =

Australian cricketer (born 2004)

Personal information
- Born: 16 November 2004 (age 21)
- Batting: Right-handed
- Bowling: Right-arm leg break
- Role: Bowler

Domestic team information
- Years: Team
- 2018/19: Tasmania
- 2020/21–present: Hobart Hurricanes
- 2020/21–present: Tasmania

Career statistics
Competition	WLA	WT20
Matches	32	48
Runs scored	246	75
Batting average	18.80	6.20
100s/50s	0/1	0/0
Top score	57	10
Balls bowled	1,104	760
Wickets	34	26
Bowling average	26.28	28.81
5 wickets in innings	1	0
10 wickets in match	0	0
Best bowling	5/33	3/17
Catches/stumpings	2/–	1/–
- Source: CricketArchive, 21 March 2021

Amy Smith (born 16 November 2004) is an Australian cricketer who plays as a right-arm leg break bowler and right-handed batter for the Tasmanian Tigers in the Women's National Cricket League (WNCL) and the Hobart Hurricanes in the Women's Big Bash League (WBBL). She made her professional debut in a WNCL match at the age of just 14 and, at the age of 15, was the youngest player in the 2020–21 WBBL. Before the 2020–21 season, Smith won the Tasmanian Female Young Player of the Year award for the second of two years in a row.

== International career ==
In December 2022, Smith was selected in the Australia Under-19 squad for the 2023 ICC Under-19 Women's T20 World Cup.
