= Molly Strano =

Australian cricketer

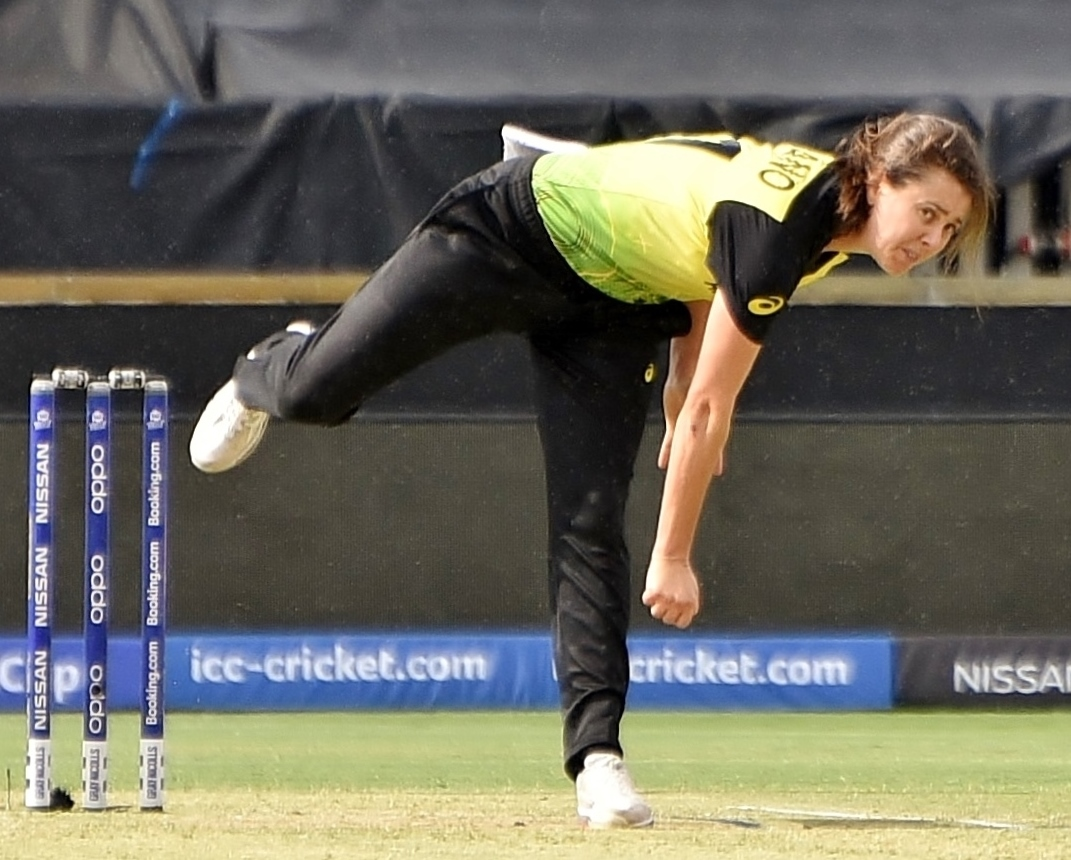
- Strano bowling for Australia during the 2020 ICC Women's T20 World Cup

Personal information
- Full name: Molly Rose Strano
- Born: 5 October 1992 (age 34); Sunshine, Victoria, Australia
- Batting: Right-handed
- Bowling: Right-arm off break
- Role: Bowler

International information
- National side: Australia (2017–present)
- T20I debut (cap 45): 17 February 2017 v New Zealand
- Last T20I: 24 February 2020 v Sri Lanka

Domestic team information
- Years: Team
- 2011/12–2020/21: Victoria
- 2015: Staffordshire
- 2015/16–2020/21: Melbourne Renegades
- 2021/22–present: Hobart Hurricanes
- 2021/22–present: Tasmania
- 2022: Southern Brave

Career statistics
Competition	WT20I	WLA	WT20
Matches	7	100	192
Runs scored	6	925	721
Batting average	1.50	26.10	15.59
100s/50s	0/0	0/1	0/0
Top score	3	51*	37*
Balls bowled	150	4,735	3,674
Wickets	9	148	217
Bowling average	17.55	22.36	18.30
5 wickets in innings	1	1	1
10 wickets in match	0	0	0
Best bowling	5/10	5/30	5/10
Catches/stumpings	3/–	21/–	37/–
- Source: ESPNcricinfo, 18 August 2021

Molly Rose Strano (born 5 October 1992) is an Australian cricketer who plays as a right-arm off break bowler and right-handed batter for the Tasmanian Tigers in the Women's National Cricket League (WNCL) and the Hobart Hurricanes in the Women's Big Bash League (WBBL).

Strano announced herself as one of the top specialist T20 spinners in the country in 2014–15, topping the wicket-taking in the women's domestic T20 competition with 22 wickets at 12.59.

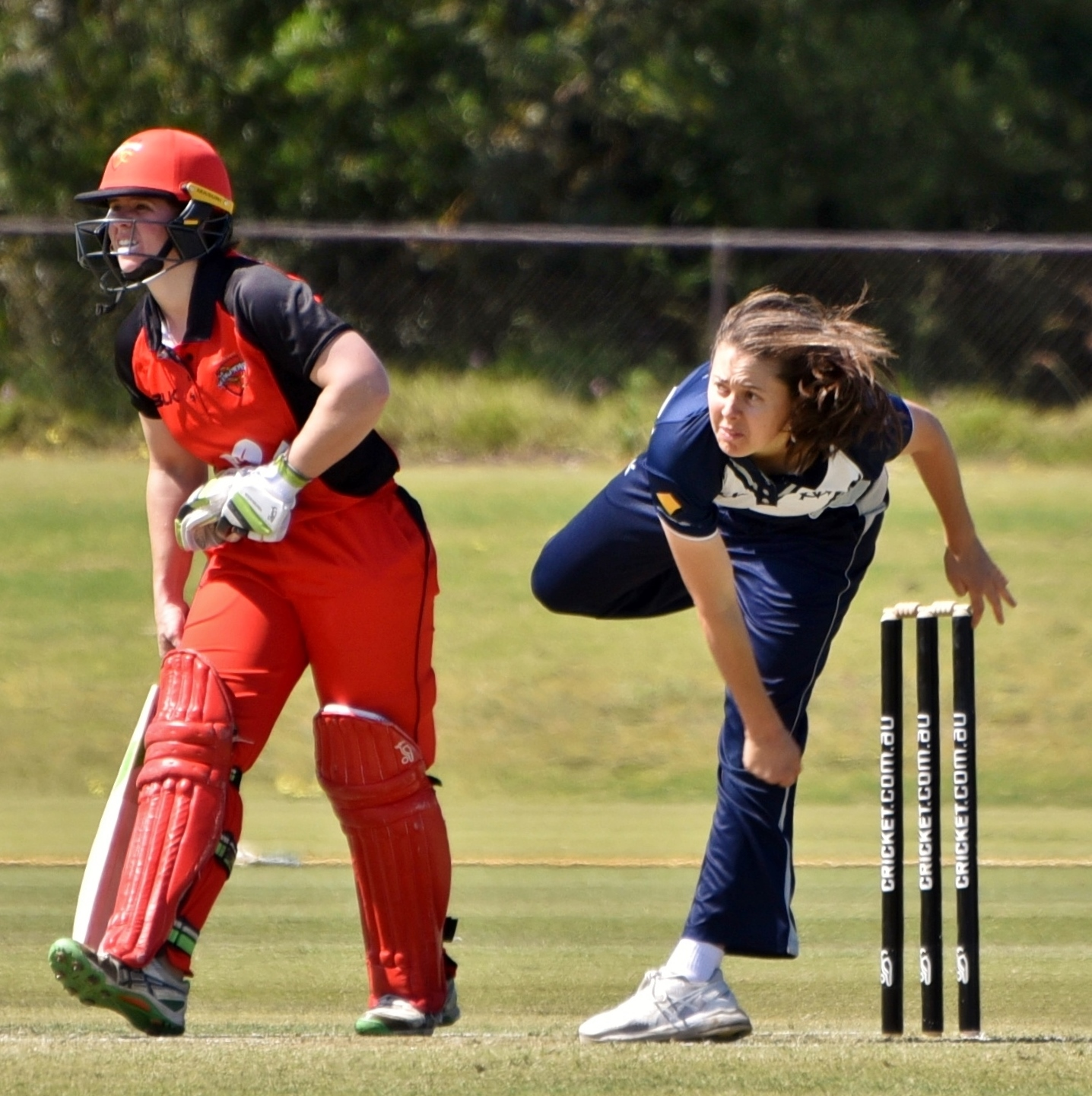
Strano bowling for Victoria, 2018

Her performances also earned her a place in the Commonwealth Bank Shooting Stars squad in 2014-15 and her miserly performances have ensured she should enter into calculations for future Southern Stars teams.

Strano missed the 2015–16 WNCL season through injury but bounced back during the inaugural season of the WBBL for the Melbourne Renegades, taking 18 wickets in the tournament to be named the Renegades’ most valuable player.

She made her WT20I debut against New Zealand on 17 February 2017.

In November 2018, she was named in the Melbourne Renegades' squad for the 2018–19 Women's Big Bash League season. In February 2020, she was added to Australia's squad for the 2020 ICC Women's T20 World Cup, replacing Tayla Vlaeminck who was ruled out due to an injury.

On 15 November 2020, Strano became the first player to take 100 wickets in the Women's Big Bash League Twenty20 competition. In March 2021, Strano was added to Australia's Women's One Day International (WODI) squad for their series against New Zealand.

In August 2021, Strano was named in Australia's squad for their series against India, which included a one-off day/night Test match as part of the tour. In January 2022, Strano was named in Australia's A squad for their series against England A, with the matches being played alongside the Women's Ashes.
