= Rachel Priest =

New Zealand cricketer (born 1985)

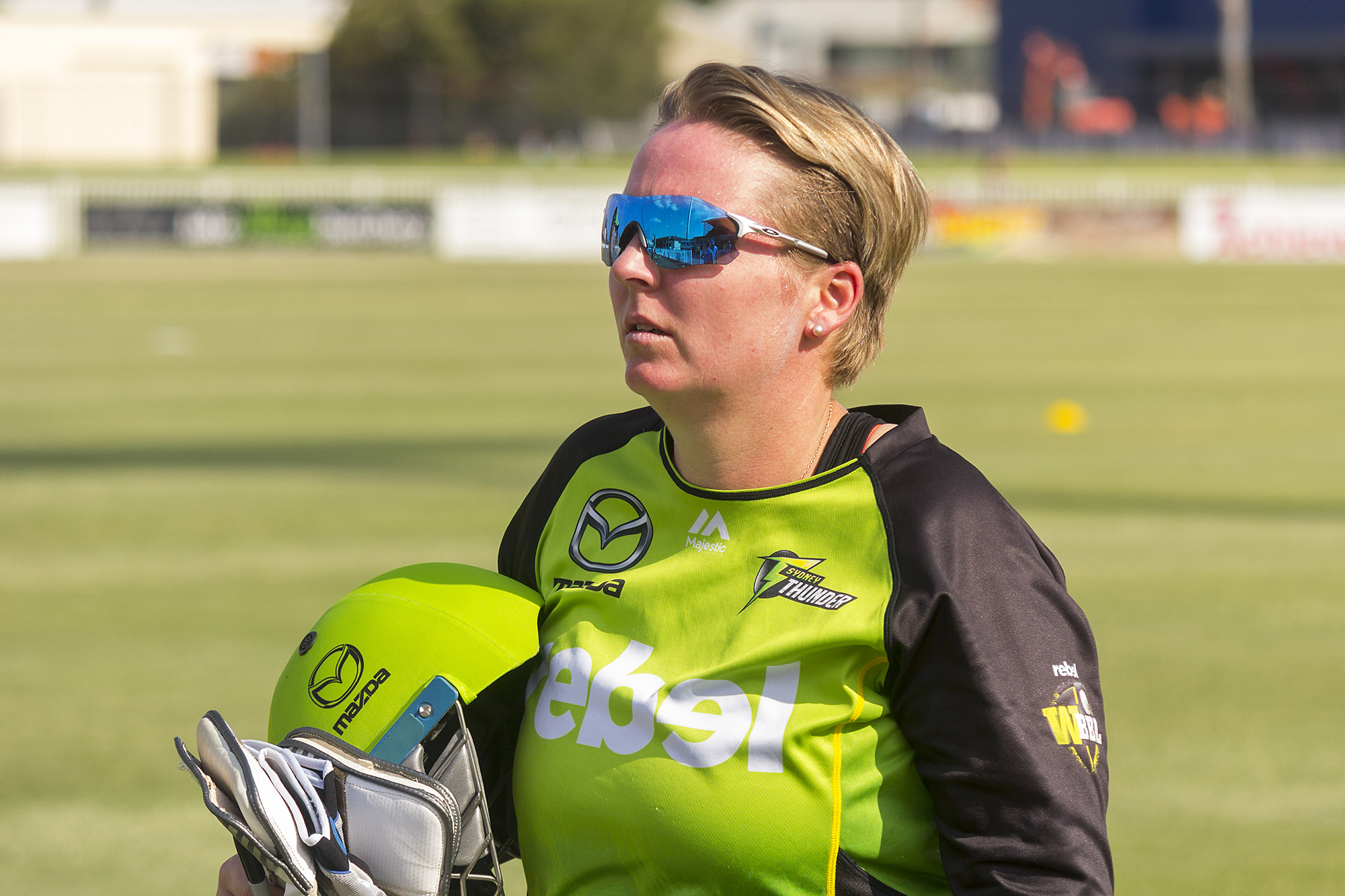
- Priest playing for Sydney Thunder, 2018

Personal information
- Full name: Rachel Holly Priest
- Born: 13 June 1985 (age 41); New Plymouth, Taranaki, New Zealand
- Nickname: Priesty
- Batting: Right-handed
- Role: Wicket-keeper

International information
- National side: New Zealand (2007–2020)
- ODI debut (cap 158): 25 July 2007 v Australia
- Last ODI: 25 January 2020 v South Africa
- T20I debut (cap 17): 19 July 2007 v Australia
- Last T20I: 2 March 2020 v Australia

Domestic team information
- Years: Team
- 2003/04–2012/13: Central Districts
- 2010: Staffordshire
- 2013/14–2019/20: Wellington
- 2015/16–2016/17: Melbourne Renegades
- 2016–2017: Berkshire
- 2016–2019: Western Storm
- 2017/18–2019/20: Sydney Thunder
- 2018–2019: Wales
- 2020/21–2021/22: Hobart Hurricanes
- 2020/21–2021/22: Tasmania
- 2021: Trent Rockets

Career statistics
Competition	WODI	WT20I	WLA	WT20
Matches	87	75	257	294
Runs scored	1,694	873	6,208	6,023
Batting average	28.23	16.78	30.13	24.48
100s/50s	2/9	0/1	8/31	3/23
Top score	157	60	178*	106*
Balls bowled	–	–	19	10
Wickets	–	–	0	1
Bowling average	–	–	–	10.00
5 wickets in innings	–	–	0	0
10 wickets in match	–	–	0	0
Best bowling	–	–	0/1	1/5
Catches/stumpings	72/21	41/32	181/68	129/157
- Source: CricketArchive, 21 March 2021

Rachel Holly Priest (born 13 June 1985 in New Plymouth, Taranaki) is a New Zealand cricketer who plays as a wicket-keeper and right-handed batter. She played for New Zealand between 2007 and 2020.

== Career ==
=== Domestic and franchise ===
In May 2018, she was signed by the Wales women's national cricket team, their first overseas signing. In November 2018, she was named in Sydney Thunder's squad for the 2018–19 Women's Big Bash League season. In January 2020, she was named in New Zealand's squad for the 2020 ICC Women's T20 World Cup in Australia. She also played for the Wellington Blaze in the State League.

In June 2020, Priest joined the Tasmanian Tigers in Australia's Women's National Cricket League.

She was drafted by Trent Rockets for the inaugural season of The Hundred.

=== International ===
She made her ODI debut in 2007 against Australia. Priest played in 87 ODIs and 75 T20Is for New Zealand before retiring from international cricket in 2020. Priest holds the record for the highest individual score by a better in a Women's ODI innings as wicketkeeper (157) and is the only wicketkeeper in Women's ODI history to score 150 in an innings. In June 2020, Priest announced her retirement from international cricket.

== One Day International centuries ==
Runs	Match	Opponents	City	Venue	Year
108	60	Sri Lanka	Lincoln, New Zealand	Bert Sutcliffe Oval	2015
157	62	Sri Lanka	Lincoln, New Zealand	Bert Sutcliffe Oval	2015

- Source: CricInfo

== See also ==
- List of centuries in women's One Day International cricket
