= Corinne Hall =

Australian cricketer

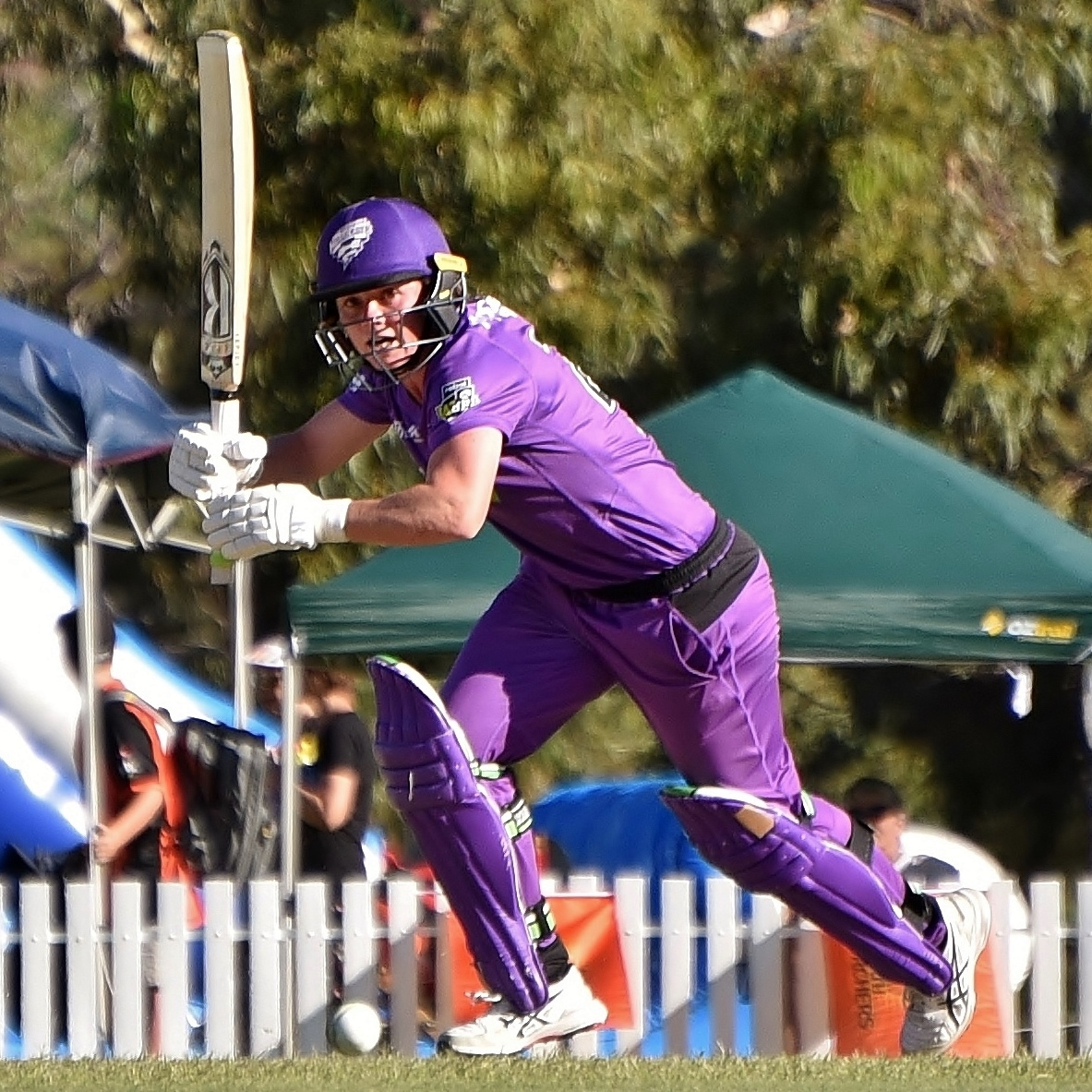
- Hall batting for the Hobart Hurricanes

Personal information
- Full name: Corinne Louise Hall
- Born: 12 October 1987 (age 39); Gosford, New South Wales, Australia
- Batting: Right-handed
- Bowling: Right-arm off break
- Role: Batter

Domestic team information
- Years: Team
- 2008/09: New South Wales
- 2010/11–2021/22: Tasmania
- 2014–2015: Berkshire
- 2015: Devon
- 2015/16–2020/21: Hobart Hurricanes (squad no. 27)
- 2015/16: Canterbury
- 2021/22–2022/23: Sydney Thunder

Career statistics
Competition	WLA	WT20
Matches	78	147
Runs scored	1,721	1,748
Batting average	26.89	16.49
100s/50s	0/12	0/2
Top score	95	53*
Balls bowled	75	71
Wickets	1	4
Bowling average	66.00	19.50
5 wickets in innings	0	0
10 wickets in match	0	0
Best bowling	1/2	1/6
Catches/stumpings	28/–	56/–
- Source: CricketArchive, 21 March 2021

Corinne Louise Hall (born 12 October 1987) is an Australian former cricketer who played as a right-handed batter and occasional right-arm off break bowler. She played for New South Wales, Tasmanian Tigers, Hobart Hurricanes and Sydney Thunder, as well as for English county sides Berkshire and Devon, and the New Zealand team Canterbury Magicians.

Originally from Newcastle in the Hunter region of New South Wales, Hall was inspired as a young cricketer by Mark Waugh and Hunter area players Belinda Clark, Leah Poulton and Sarah Andrews. At the end of the 2004–05 season, she won the Cricket NSW female Rising Star award. However, NSW had such a strong women's cricket team that there was not a lot of opportunity for her in that state.

In 2009, Hall was recruited by Cricket Tasmania to play for Tasmania, as that team began its first season in the Women's National Cricket League. After joining the Tasmania, she became a top order batter, and also a regular bowler. She continued to live in Sydney and train with a Sydney-based coach, but travelled to Tasmania for training camps, pre-season tours and matches.

Hall was selected as a Hobart Hurricane for its inaugural WBBL|01 competition (2015–16). In a memorable performance that season against the Melbourne Renegades at Aurora Stadium in Launceston, she took two sharp catches, one of them in a one-handed leap, achieved two run outs, and was named player-of-the-match.

In July 2016, Hall was disciplined by Cricket Australia after admitting a charge of placing two bets relating to two matches in the Matador Cup competition. She received a two-year ban, 18 months of which were suspended. Cricket Tasmania announced that it would continue to support her, as she had accepted her penalty and apologised to the organisation, including the Cricket Tasmania Board, coaching staff and her teammates. As the ban was backdated to the date in April 2016 when Cricket Australia was made aware of the breach, the active part of it expired in October 2016.

Hall remained contracted to Tasmania, and was selected in the Hurricanes squad for the WBBL|02 season (2016–17). In November 2018, she was named in the Hobart Hurricanes' squad for the 2018–19 Women's Big Bash League season.

Off the field, Hall has studied Early Childhood and Nursing. As of 2012, she was managing a retail cricket store.
