= Hobart Hurricanes (WBBL) =

Tasmanian women's Twenty20 cricket team

- League: Women's Big Bash League

Personnel
- Captain: Nicola Carey
- Coach: Jude Coleman

Team information
- City: Hobart
- Colours: Purple
- Home ground: Ninja Stadium

History
- Twenty20 debut: 11 December 2015
- WBBL wins: 1 (WBBL11)
- T20 Spring Challenge wins: 2 (2024, 2025)
- Official website: Hobart Hurricanes

The Hobart Hurricanes are a women's Twenty20 cricket team based in Hobart, Tasmania. They compete in the Women's Big Bash League. They won their first title in 2025.

== History ==
=== Formation ===
One of eight founding WBBL teams, the Hobart Hurricanes are aligned with the men's team of the same name. At the official WBBL launch on 10 July 2015, Julie Hunter was unveiled as the team's first-ever player signing. Julia Price was appointed as the Hurricanes' inaugural coach, while Heather Knight became the inaugural captain.

The Hurricanes played their first match on 11 December against the Melbourne Renegades at Aurora Stadium, winning by 35 runs.

=== Rivalries ===
==== Melbourne Stars ====
The Hurricanes and Melbourne Stars have combined to produce an inordinate number of matches with close finishes, including:

- 16 January 2016, Blacktown ISP Oval: On a crumbling pitch, criticised earlier in the Australian summer for its sub-standard preparation, the Stars crawled to a first innings total of 7/96 before fighting back to have the Hurricanes at 4/49 in the twelfth over of the run chase. An unbroken stand of 48 runs from the next 51 balls between Corinne Hall and Amy Satterthwaite steered Hobart out of trouble, with Hall scoring a single on the final delivery to secure victory for the 'Canes.
- 20 January 2017, Blundstone Arena: In a rain-affected encounter, Hobart posted a first innings total of 3/115 off 14 overs. Chasing a revised target of 98 from twelve overs, Melbourne lost 4/7 late in the match (including the wicket of Emma Inglis for 51 off 31) to leave a required twelve runs from the last two balls for victory. Jess Cameron proceeded to hit a six off the penultimate legal delivery before Hurricanes off-spinner Amy Satterthwaite bowled a front-foot no-ball while also conceding a four on what would have otherwise been the final ball of the innings. With Satterthwaite having to bowl the final delivery again, Cameron scored the remaining single needed to pull off an unlikely six-wicket win for the Stars.
- 21 January 2017, Blundstone Arena: The following morning, on the last day of the WBBL|02 regular season, the Stars and Hurricanes met again—this time in what was effectively a quarter-final knockout match with the winner progressing to the semi-finals and the loser being eliminated from the tournament. Meg Lanning made 81 runs for the Stars in the first innings, earning Player of the Match honours, but was dismissed in the 19th over by a stunning Julie Hunter catch at square leg. A spell of 3/11 off four overs by Kristen Beams was not enough to defend the target of 136 as the Hurricanes scored the winning runs (through Corinne Hall again) with four wickets in hand and one ball remaining.

==== Sydney Sixers ====
The Hurricanes and Sydney Sixers have met in two semi-finals:

- 22 January 2016, Melbourne Cricket Ground: In a match initially shortened to 14 overs per side due to rain, the higher-ranked Hurricanes struggled in the first innings, managing a score of just 8/86. Further rain delays meant the Sixers' target was revised to 55 runs from eight overs, under the Duckworth–Lewis–Stern method. Sydney cruised to victory with all ten wickets in hand and ten balls remaining. Veteran off-spinner Lisa Sthalekar was named Player of the Match for her bowling figures of 3/9 from three overs.
- 25 January 2017, The Gabba: Acting captain Alyssa Healy belted 77 runs off 45 balls to help the Sixers to 6/169 in the first innings. In reply, the Hurricanes were skittled for a miserly 66 runs, setting a new WBBL record for lowest all out total. The 103-run margin also set a new WBBL record for the largest victory by a team batting first.

The Sixers defeated the Hurricanes in their first eleven encounters, setting a WBBL record for the longest head-to-head winning streak. The Hurricanes finally defeated the Sixers on their twelfth attempt:

- 20 November 2019, North Sydney Oval: With captain Ellyse Perry sidelined due to a shoulder injury, the Sixers faltered early to a score of 5/30. A resurgence, led by Marizanne Kapp's unbeaten 55 off 40 balls, helped Sydney to a total of 7/134. Hobart's chase got off to a shaky start as they found themselves down 4/22 after five overs. A healthy partnership between batters Nicola Carey and Corinne Hall came to an end in the 15th over when Hall was spectacularly caught by former Hurricanes player Erin Burns in the outfield. With 44 runs required from the final 33 deliveries, Carey went on to make 55 not out while a quickfire 29 by Chloe Tryon sealed victory for the Hurricanes with five wickets in hand and ten balls remaining. In addition to snapping their elongated head-to-head losing streak, the win set a new mark for Hobart's highest successful run chase. Belinda Vakarewa, who sliced through the Sixers' top-order, was named Player of the Match for her bowling figures of 4/19.

== Captaincy records ==
There have been seven captains in the Hurricanes' history, including matches featuring an acting captain.

Captain	Span	M	Won	Lost	NR	W–L%
Heather Knight	2015–17	30	15	14	1	51.72
Corinne Hall	2017–20	37	7	27	3	20.59
Isobel Joyce	2018	5	2	3	0	40
Sasha Moloney	2018–19	14	2	12	0	14.29
Rachel Priest	2021	14	5	8	1	38.46
Elyse Villani	2022–25	49	25	21	3	54.35
Heather Graham	2023	1	0	1	0	0
Nicola Carey	2026	3	0	3	0	0

== Season summaries ==
Chart of yearly table positions for Hobart Hurricanes in WBBL

Season	W–L	Pos.	Finals	Coach	Captain	Most Runs	Most Wickets	Most Valuable Player	Refs
2015–16	8–6	2nd	SF	Julia Price	Heather Knight	Heather Knight – 363	Veronica Pyke – 22	Heather Knight	
2016–17	7-6	4th	SF	Julia Price	Heather Knight	Heather Knight – 334	Hayley Matthews – 20	Amy Satterthwaite	
2017–18	2–12	8th	DNQ	Julia Price	Corinne Hall (Note: Isobel Joyce stood in as acting captain for five games.)	Hayley Matthews and Georgia Redmayne – 297	Nicola Hancock – 11	Hayley Matthews	
2018–19	2–12	8th	DNQ	Salliann Beams	Sasha Moloney	Heather Knight – 374	Brooke Hepburn – 15	Heather Knight	
2019	4–9	7th	DNQ	Salliann Beams	Corinne Hall	Heather Knight – 282	Belinda Vakarewa – 20	Belinda Vakarewa	
2020	3–9	8th	DNQ	Salliann Beams	Corinne Hall	Rachel Priest – 354	Hayley Matthews – 12	Rachel Priest	
2021	5–8	6th	DNQ	Salliann Beams	Rachel Priest	Mignon du Preez – 414	Molly Strano – 15	Tayla Vlaeminck	
2022	7–6	4th	EF	Dan Marsh	Elyse Villani	Mignon du Preez – 380	Molly Strano – 18	–	
2023	6-7	6th	DNQ	Dan Marsh	Elyse Villani (Note: Heather Graham stood in as acting captain for one game.)	Lizelle Lee – 409	Heather Graham – 16	Lizelle Lee	
2024	5-5	4th	KF	Jude Coleman	Elyse Villani	Lizelle Lee – 399	Heather Graham – 13	Nicola Carey	
2025	7–2*	1st*	C	Jude Coleman	Elyse Villani	Danni Wyatt-Hodge – 432	Heather Graham – 16	Danni Wyatt-Hodge	

Legend
DNQ	Did not qualify	SF	Semi-finalists	*	Led the league
EF	Lost the Eliminator	RU	Runners-up	^	League record
KF	Lost the Knockout	CF	Lost the Challenger	C	Champions

== Home grounds ==
Venue	Games hosted by season											
Venue	01	02	03	04	05	06	07	08	09	10	11	Total
Bellerive Oval	2	5	5	3	2	N/A (Note: All WBBL|06 matches were scheduled to be played in Sydney due to the COVID-19 pandemic)	3	3	4	4	5	36
Invermay Park	–	–	–	–	1	N/A	1	–	–	–	–	2
Kingston Twin Ovals	2	–	–	–	–	N/A	–	–	–	–	–	2
Latrobe Recreation Ground	–	–	–	–	–	N/A	–	3	–	–	–	3
West Park Oval	–	–	–	2	2	N/A	–	–	–	–	–	4
York Park	4	1	2	2	–	N/A	4	–	2	–	–	15

== Current squad ==
The squad of the Hobart Hurricanes for the WBBL|12 as of 6 November 2026.

- Players with international caps are listed in **bold**.
- * denotes a player who is unavailable for rest of the season.

No.	Name	Nat.	Birth Date	Batting Style	Bowling Style	Additional Info.
Batters
20	**Maddy Green**	New Zealand	20 October 1992 (age 34)	Right-handed	Right-arm off spin	International Replacement Player
8	Rachel Trenaman	Australia	8 April 2001 (age 25)	Right-handed	Right-arm leg spin	
22	**Danni Wyatt-Hodge**	England	22 April 1991 (age 35)	Right-handed	Right-arm off spin	International Signing; Ruled out through injury
All-rounders
99	**Chamari Athapaththu**	Sri Lanka	9 February 1990 (age 36)	Left-handed	Right-arm off spin	International Replacement Player
16	**Nicola Carey**	Australia	10 September 1993 (age 33)	Left-handed	Right-arm medium	Captain
11	**Heather Graham**	Australia	5 October 1996 (age 30)	Right-handed	Right-arm medium	
48	**Chinelle Henry**	West Indies	17 August 1995 (age 31)	Right-handed	Right-arm medium-fast	International Signing
28	Ruth Johnston	Australia	28 February 2003 (age 23)	Right-handed	Right-arm off spin	
Wicket-keepers
67	**Lizelle Lee**	South Africa Australia	2 April 1992 (age 34)	Right-handed	Right-arm medium	Contracted as a local player
16	Kate Pelle	Australia	17 January 2006 (age 20)	Right-handed	Right-arm medium	
Bowlers
46	Ira Aery	Australia	25 February 2009 (age 17)	Right-handed	Right-arm fast-medium	Local Replacement Player
12	Ella Hayward	Australia	8 September 2003 (age 23)	Right-handed	Right-arm off spin	
4	Hayley Silver-Holmes	Australia	18 August 2003 (age 23)	Right-handed	Right-arm fast	
14	Amy Smith	Australia	16 November 2004 (age 21)	Right-handed	Right-arm leg spin	
6	Lauren Smith	Australia	6 October 1996 (age 30)	Right-handed	Right-arm off spin	
50	**Linsey Smith**	England	10 March 1995 (age 31)	Left-handed	Left-arm orthodox	International Signing
26	**Molly Strano**	Australia	5 October 1992 (age 34)	Right-handed	Right-arm off spin	
5	Callie Wilson	Australia	1 November 2003 (age 23)	Right-handed	Right-arm medium	

== Administration and support staff ==
Position	Name
Head Coach	(Australia) Jude Coleman
Assistant coach	Lauren Winfield-Hill
Bowling coach	Kristen Beams
Batting coach	Mark McInnes

== Players ==
=== Australian representatives ===
(Australia) The following is a list of cricketers who have played for the Hurricanes after making their debut in the national women's team (the period they spent as both a Hurricanes squad member and an Australian-capped player is in brackets):

- Julie Hunter (WBBL|01–02)
- Nicola Carey (WBBL|05–12)
- Belinda Vakarewa (WBBL|05–07)
- Tayla Vlaeminck (WBBL|05–07)
- Naomi Stalenberg (WBBL|06–09)
- Molly Strano (WBBL|07–12)
- Heather Graham (WBBL|08–12)
- Elyse Villani (WBBL|08–11)

=== Overseas marquees ===
- (England) Heather Knight (WBBL|01–02, 04–05)
- (Cricket West Indies) Hayley Matthews (WBBL|01–06)
- (New Zealand) Amy Satterthwaite (WBBL|01–02)
- (Republic of Ireland) Isobel Joyce (WBBL|02–03)
- (India) Veda Krishnamurthy (WBBL|03)
- (England) Lauren Winfield-Hill (WBBL|03)
- (England) Alex Hartley (WBBL|04)
- (India) Smriti Mandhana (WBBL|04)
- (South Africa) Chloe Tryon (WBBL|05–06, 10)
- (England) Fran Wilson (WBBL|05)
- (New Zealand) Hayley Jensen (WBBL|06, 08)
- (New Zealand) Rachel Priest (WBBL|06–07)
- (South Africa) Mignon du Preez (WBBL|07–08)
- (India) Richa Ghosh (WBBL|07)
- (South Africa) Lizelle Lee (WBBL|08–10)
- (South Africa) Shabnim Ismail (WBBL|09)
- (England) Bryony Smith (WBBL|09)
- (New Zealand) Suzie Bates (WBBL|10)
- (New Zealand) Rosemary Mair (WBBL|10)
- (England) Danni Wyatt-Hodge (WBBL|10–11)
- (England) Nat Sciver-Brunt (WBBL|11)
- (England) Linsey Smith (WBBL|11–12)
- (Cricket West Indies) Chinelle Henry (WBBL|12)
- (Sri Lanka) Chamari Athapaththu (WBBL|12)

=== Associate rookies ===
- (Ireland) Kim Garth (WBBL|01)
- (Ireland) Gaby Lewis (WBBL|02)
- (Scotland) Sarah Bryce (WBBL|03)
- (Scotland) Kathryn Bryce (WBBL|10–11)

== Honours ==
- Champions: 1 – WBBL|11
- Runners-Up: 0
- Minor Premiers: 1 – WBBL|11
- Finals Appearances: 4 – WBBL|01, WBBL|02, WBBL|08, WBBL|10, WBBL|11
- Wooden Spoons: 3 – WBBL|03, WBBL|04, WBBL|06

== Statistics and awards ==
=== Team stats ===
- Win–loss record:

Opposition	M	Won	Lost	Tied	NR	W–L%
Adelaide Strikers	22	6	13	0	3	31.58
Brisbane Heat	21	6	14	0	1	30
Melbourne Renegades	21	13	8	0	0	61.90
Melbourne Stars	22	13	9	0	0	59.09
Perth Scorchers	22	8	12	0	2	40
Sydney Sixers	24	3	21	0	0	12.50
Sydney Thunder	22	8	12	0	2	40
Total	154	57	89	0	8	39.86

- Highest score in an innings: 3/212 (20 overs) vs Melbourne Renegades, 23 November 2023
- Highest successful chase: 3/189 (19.1 overs) vs Perth Scorchers, 29 November 2025
- Lowest successful defence: 7/117 (20 overs) vs Adelaide Strikers, 12 December 2015
- Largest victory:
  - Batting first: 93 runs vs Melbourne Renegades, 23 November 2023
  - Batting second: 56 balls remaining vs Melbourne Renegades, 7 November 2022
- Longest winning streak: 5 matches
- Longest losing streak: 10 matches

=== Individual stats ===
- Most runs: Lizelle Lee – 1,477
- Highest score in an innings: Lizelle Lee – 150* (75) vs Perth Scorchers, 10 November 2024
- Highest partnership: Nicola Carey and Danni Wyatt-Hodge – 143 vs Sydney Thunder, 9 November 2025
- Most wickets: Nicola Carey – 90
- Best bowling figures in an innings: Molly Strano – 5/16 (3 overs) vs Melbourne Stars, 1 December 2025
- Hat-tricks taken: Amy Satterthwaite vs Sydney Thunder, 16 January 2017
- Most catches (fielder): Nicola Carey – 33
- Most dismissals (wicket-keeper): Georgia Redmayne – 30 (18 catches, 12 stumpings)

=== Individual awards ===
- Player of the Match:
  - Lizelle Lee – 8
  - Hayley Matthews – 5
  - Nicola Carey, Heather Graham, Heather Knight, Amy Satterthwaite, and Danni Wyatt-Hodge – 4
  - Mignon du Preez, Rachel Priest, and Belinda Vakarewa – 3
  - Corinne Hall – 2
  - Kathryn Bryce, Erin Burns, Erin Fazackerley, Maisy Gibson, Brooke Hepburn, Julie Hunter, Ruth Johnston, Smriti Mandhana, Nat Sciver-Brunt, Hayley Silver-Holmes, Molly Strano, and Elyse Villani – 1
- WBBL Player of the Final:
  - Lizelle Lee – WBBL|11
- WBBL Team of the Tournament:
  - Heather Knight – WBBL|01
  - Veronica Pyke – WBBL|01
  - Belinda Vakarewa – WBBL|05
  - Tayla Vlaeminck – WBBL|07
  - Molly Strano – WBBL|08
  - Lizelle Lee – WBBL|10
  - Heather Graham – WBBL|11
  - Danni Wyatt-Hodge – WBBL|11
- Others Records

Lizelle Lee has multiple WBBL records which she broke in WBBL|10, these are: the highest score in an innings (150* off 75 balls), the most sixes in an innings (12) and is the first and only player to score back to back WBBL centuries (150* & 103).

== Sponsors ==
Year	Kit Manufacturer	Chest Sponsor	Back Sponsor	Breast Sponsor	Sleeve Sponsor
2015–16	Majestic	Rebel	Cripps	Cripps	Rebel
2016–17	Majestic	Rebel	Davey Street	Davey Street	Rebel
2017–18	Majestic	Rebel	—N/a	Davey Street	Rebel
2018–19	Majestic	MyState	MyState	Cadbury	Rebel
2019–20	Majestic	MyState	MyState	Cadbury	Rebel
2020–21	Majestic	Tassal	Tassal	Cadbury	Blundstone
2021–22	Nike	Hydro Tasmania	Hydro Tasmania	Cadbury	University of Tasmania
2022–23	Nike	Hydro Tasmania	Hydro Tasmania	Cadbury	RedZed
2023–24	Nike	Tasmania	Tasmania	Cadbury	RedZed
2024–25	Nike	Tasmania	Tasmania	Shark	RedZed
2025–26	New Balance	Shark		Tasmania	

== See also ==
- Cricket Tasmania
- Hobart Hurricanes
- Tasmanian Roar
