= Tayla Vlaeminck =

Australian cricketer (born 1998)

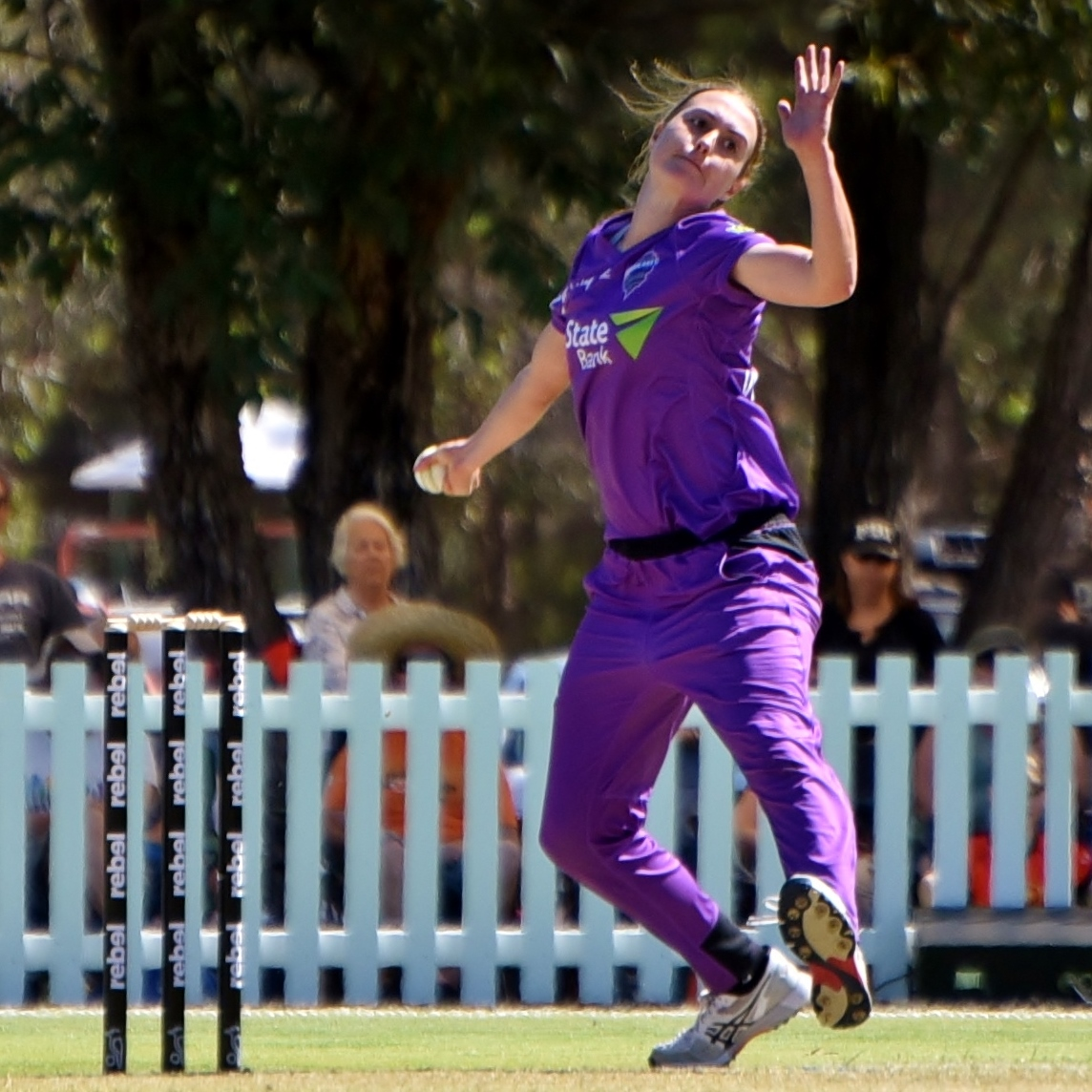
- Vlaeminck bowling in 2019

Personal information
- Full name: Tayla Jade Vlaeminck
- Born: 27 October 1998 (age 28); Bendigo, Victoria, Australia
- Height: 1.75 m (5 ft 9 in)
- Batting: Right-handed
- Bowling: Right-arm fast
- Role: Bowler

International information
- National side: Australia (2018–present)
- Only Test (cap 176): 18 July 2019 v England
- ODI debut (cap 140): 22 October 2018 v Pakistan
- Last ODI: 7 April 2021 v New Zealand
- T20I debut (cap 51): 17 November 2018 v India
- Last T20I: 11 October 2024 v Pakistan
- T20I shirt no.: 30

Domestic team information
- Years: Team
- 2017/18–2023/24: Victoria
- 2018/19: Melbourne Renegades
- 2019/20–2021/22: Hobart Hurricanes

Career statistics
Competition	Test	ODI	T20I	LA
Matches	1	8	20	27
Runs scored	–	–	0	24
Batting average	–	–	0.00	6.00
100s/50s	–	–	0/0	0/0
Top score	–	–	0	10
Balls bowled	66	306	366	1,012
Wickets	0	7	18	23
Bowling average	–	28.71	21.27	32.60
5 wickets in innings	–	0	0	0
10 wickets in match	–	0	0	0
Best bowling	–	2/14	3/12	4/16
Catches/stumpings	0/–	3/–	7/–	16/–
- Source: ESPNcricinfo, 5 October 2025

Tayla Jade Vlaeminck (born 27 October 1998) is an Australian cricketer who plays as a right-arm fast bowler and right-handed batter for Australia, Victoria and Melbourne Renegades.

== Early life ==
Vlaeminck was raised in Bendigo, where she played both cricket and soccer. After taking the field for the Northern Rivers region in the under-14 girls state cricket championships, she joined the Victorian Under-14 team. Before long, she was selected in the Under-18s. As a 15 year old, she came close to quitting cricket in favour of soccer, but was persuaded to keep playing.

In early 2015, Vlaeminck ruptured her anterior cruciate ligament. Just two matches after completing a full recovery and rehabilitation program, she suffered a second ACL injury, in the form of a partial tear. On advice from a surgeon, she kept playing for two months, including for the Victorian Under-18s, until the ACL ruptured again.

== Professional career ==
While recovering from her second ACL rupture, Tayla was signed by the Melbourne Renegades for the 2016–17 Women's Big Bash League. She ended up largely carrying drinks and soaking up the team atmosphere.

Prior to the 2017–18 WNCL season, Vlaeminck was selected for Victorian Spirit. During her WNCL debut, against the ACT Meteors at Manuka Oval in October 2017, she took the new ball; her 2-34 off seven overs included the wickets of Dane van Niekerk and Nicola Hancock. A month later, she played for the Cricket Australia XI in a tour match against England.

In late November 2017, Vlaeminck dislocated her shoulder playing another match for Victoria. That injury prevented her from playing for the Renegades in WBBL|03. However, she then played well enough in two further matches for Victoria to be selected for the Australian Under-19 tour of South Africa in March 2018. A bout of glandular fever almost prevented her from joining that tour, but after a low key start, she captured 5–32 in 6.5 overs against South Africa in Pretoria. In the series final, also against South Africa, she took a match-winning 6–27 in 7.5 overs.

In September 2018, Vlaeminck was named in Australia's squad for the Women's Twenty20 International (WT20I) series against New Zealand, but she did not play. The following month, she was named in Australia's squad for the series against Pakistan and the 2018 ICC Women's World Twenty20. She made her Women's One Day International cricket (WODI) debut for Australia Women against Pakistan Women on 22 October 2018. She made her Women's Twenty20 International cricket (WT20I) debut for Australia Women against India Women on 17 November 2018 in the 2018 ICC Women's World Twenty20.

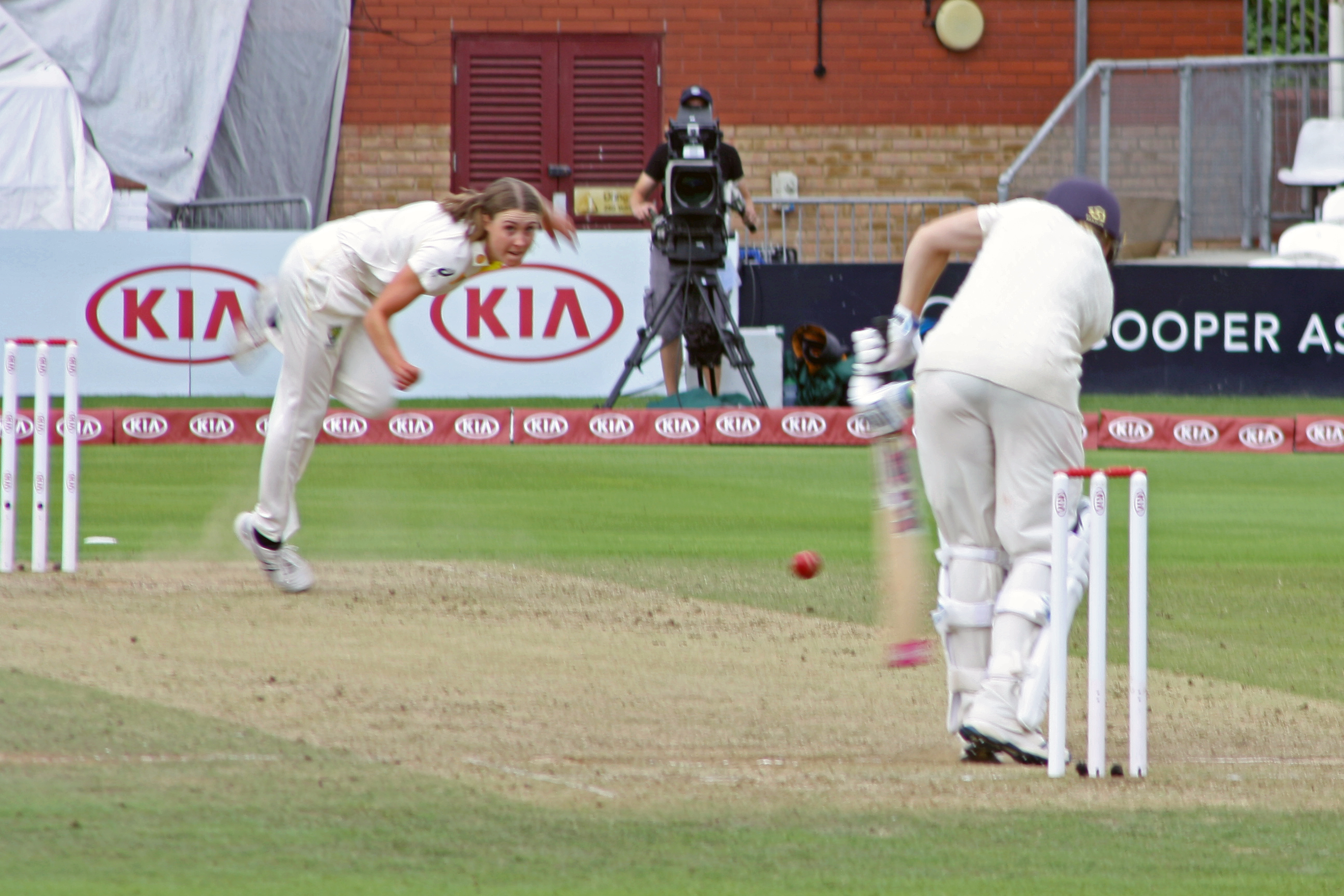
Vlaeminck bowling on debut in the 2019 Ashes

In November 2018, she was named in the Melbourne Renegades' squad for the 2018–19 Women's Big Bash League season. In April 2019, Cricket Australia awarded her with a contract with the National Performance Squad ahead of the 2019–20 season. In June 2019, Cricket Australia named her in Australia's team for their tour to England to contest the Women's Ashes. She made her Test debut for Australia against England women on 18 July 2019. In January 2020, she was named in Australia's squad for the 2020 ICC Women's T20 World Cup in Australia. However, the following month, she was ruled out of the tournament, after suffering a stress injury of her right foot.

In April 2020, Cricket Australia awarded Vlaeminck with a central contract ahead of the 2020–21 season. In January 2022, Vlaeminck was named in Australia's squad for their series against England to contest the Women's Ashes. Vlaeminck played the first match in the series against England, before suffering another stress fracture leading up the 2022 Women's Cricket World Cup. The injury caused her to miss both the World Cup and the Ashes.

In June 2023, eighteen months after her last international match, she was selected to play for Australia A against England A, for their series along the Women's Ashes. She played four matches, taking a wicket in each, before picking up a left shoulder injury in the last 50-over match. She was later ruled out of the 2023–24 Women's Big Bash League.

She was named in the Australia squad for the 2024 ICC Women's T20 World Cup but suffered a shoulder injury in the group match against Pakistan and was ruled out of the rest of the tournament.

== Personal life ==
Off the field, Vlaeminck has studied physiotherapy at La Trobe University in Bundoora.
