= 2018–19 Melbourne Stars WBBL season =

Melbourne Stars
2018–19 season
- Melbourne Stars 2018–19 cap logo
- Coach: David Hemp
- Captain(s): Kristen Beams
- Home ground: Melbourne Cricket Ground
- League: WBBL
- Record: 5–8 (7th)
- Finals: DNQ
- Leading Run Scorer: Lizelle Lee – 276
- Leading Wicket Taker: Alana King – 15
- Player of the Season: Alana King

The 2018–19 Melbourne Stars Women's season was the fourth in the team's history. Coached by David Hemp and captained by Kristen Beams, they finished seventh in the regular season of WBBL|04 and failed to qualify for the finals.

== Squad ==
Each 2018–19 squad featured 15 active players, with an allowance of up to five marquee signings including a maximum of three from overseas. Under a new rule, Australian marquees were classed as players who held a national women's team contract at the time of signing on for their WBBL|04 team.

Personnel changes included:

- Holly Ferling joined the Stars, having spent three seasons with the Brisbane Heat where she was the first-ever player signing.
- After winning two championships as a member of the Sydney Sixers, Angela Reakes made a move interstate to sign with Melbourne.
- Nicola Hancock joined the Stars, having played previous seasons with the Hobart Hurricanes and the Melbourne Renegades.
- Hayleigh Brennan departed the team and subsequently signed with the Perth Scorchers.
- In August 2018, Emma Kearney confirmed her decision to quit cricket and instead focus on her AFL Women's career.
- In September 2018, Gemma Triscari announced her retirement from the WBBL.
- New Zealand player Katey Martin replaced England marquee Georgia Elwiss, who was unable late in the season due to national team commitments, for two matches.

The table below lists the Stars players and their key stats (including runs scored, batting strike rate, wickets taken, economy rate, catches and stumpings) for the season.

No.	Name	Nat.	Birth date	Batting style	Bowling style	G	R	SR	W	E	C	S	Notes
Batters
00	Mignon du Preez	(South Africa)	13 June 1989	Right-handed	–	14	266	109.46	–	–	3	–	Overseas marquee
34	Georgia Elwiss	(England)	31 May 1991	Right-handed	Right-arm medium	12	129	96.26	3	7.97	4	–	Overseas marquee
2	Katie Mack	(Australia)	14 September 1993	Right-handed	Right-arm leg spin	11	90	79.64	–	–	3	–	
21	Katey Martin	(New Zealand)	7 February 1985	Right-handed	–	2	17	54.83	–	–	0	–	Overseas marquee (replacement)
8	Angela Reakes	(Australia)	27 December 1990	Right-handed	Right-arm leg spin	14	221	100.45	0	18.00	3	–	
All-rounders
15	Makinley Blows	(Australia)	12 December 1997	Left-handed	Right-arm medium	3	4	80.00	0	14.66	0	–	
14	Elly Donald	(Australia)	17 September 1997	Right-handed	Right-arm medium	–	–	–	–	–	–	–	
76	Erin Osborne	(Australia)	27 June 1989	Right-handed	Right-arm off spin	14	249	103.31	9	6.39	3	–	
3	Annabel Sutherland	(Australia)	12 October 2001	Right-handed	Right-arm medium fast	14	123	93.89	7	6.80	4	–	
Wicket-keepers
4	Nicole Faltum	(Australia)	17 January 2000	Right-handed	–	8	14	87.50	–	–	4	3	
67	Lizelle Lee	(South Africa)	2 April 1992	Right-handed	Right-arm medium	14	276	136.63	–	–	4	0	Overseas marquee
Bowlers
26	Kristen Beams	(Australia)	6 November 1984	Right-handed	Right-arm leg spin	6	2	66.66	6	7.09	2	–	Captain, Australian marquee
9	Holly Ferling	(Australia)	22 December 1995	Right-handed	Right-arm medium fast	14	20	125.00	11	7.90	1	–	
44	Nicola Hancock	(Australia)	8 November 1995	Right-handed	Right-arm medium fast	14	37	90.24	13	8.09	3	–	
13	Alana King	(Australia)	22 November 1995	Right-handed	Right-arm leg spin	14	78	88.63	15	6.74	8	–	
7	Chloe Rafferty	(Australia)	16 June 1999	Right-handed	Right-arm medium fast	–	–	–	–	–	–	–	

== Ladder ==
Pos	Team	Pld	W	L	NR	Pts	NRR
1	Sydney Sixers (RU)	14	10	4	0	20	0.509
2	Sydney Thunder	14	9	4	1	19	0.479
3	Brisbane Heat (C)	14	9	5	0	18	1.118
4	Melbourne Renegades	14	7	6	1	15	−0.079
5	Perth Scorchers	14	7	7	0	14	−0.476
6	Adelaide Strikers	14	5	8	1	11	−0.336
7	Melbourne Stars	14	5	8	1	11	−0.905
8	Hobart Hurricanes	14	2	12	0	4	−0.364

- The four top ranked teams qualified for the play-off phase

== Fixtures ==
All times are local time

Match 2
1 December 2018
13:50
Scorecard

Sydney Sixers; 7/165 (20 overs)	v	Melbourne Stars; 3/166 (17.2 overs)
Alyssa Healy 70 (47); Nicola Hancock 4/22 (4 overs)		Lizelle Lee 102 (56); Dane van Niekerk 1/22 (3 overs)

Melbourne Stars won by 7 wickets (with 16 balls remaining)
CitiPower Centre, St Kilda
Umpires: Mattis van Eck and Michael Graham-Smith
Player of the match: Lizelle Lee (Melbourne Stars)

- Sydney Sixers won the toss and elected to bat
- Broadcast by Seven Network and Fox Cricket

Match 6
8 December 2018
14:00
Scorecard

Hobart Hurricanes; 6/158 (20.0 overs)	v	Melbourne Stars; 5/159 (19.5 overs)
Heather Knight 82* (55); Annabel Sutherland 2/30 (4 overs)		Erin Osborne 67 (46); Hayley Matthews 2/23 (4 overs)

Melbourne Stars won by 5 wickets (with 1 ball remaining)
West Park Oval, Burnie
Umpires: Darren Close and Jeremiah Matibiri
Player of the match: Erin Osborne (Melbourne Stars)

- Melbourne Stars won the toss and elected to field

Match 10
9 December 2018
10:30
Scorecard

Hobart Hurricanes; 6/196 (20 overs)	v	Melbourne Stars; 124 (16.5 overs)
Smriti Mandhana 69 (41); Alana King 2/22 (3 overs)		Angela Reakes 31 (24); Heather Knight 3/10 (3 overs)

Hobart Hurricanes won by 72 runs
West Park, Burnie
Umpires: Darren Close and Jeremiah Matibiri
Player of the match: Smriti Mandhana (Hobart Hurricanes)

- Hobart Hurricanes won the toss and elected to bat

Match 13
15 December 2018
10:00
Scorecard

Melbourne Stars; 9/124 (20 overs)	v	Perth Scorchers; 2/125 (19 overs)
Georgia Elwiss 26 (24); Emma King 2/12 (3 overs)		Elyse Villani 52* (49); Erin Osborne 1/19 (4 overs)

Perth Scorchers won by 8 wickets (with 6 balls remaining)
Casey Fields, Melbourne
Umpires: Dale Ireland and Mattis van Eck
Player of the match: Heather Graham (Perth Scorchers)

- Perth Scorchers won the toss and elected to field

Match 16
16 December 2018
10:00
Scorecard

Perth Scorchers; 7/90 (20 overs)	v	Melbourne Stars; 6/91 (15.3 overs)
Nicole Bolton 36 (44); Kristen Beams 3/13 (3 overs)		Katie Mack 33 (31); Hayley Jensen 2/16 (3 overs)

Melbourne Stars won by 4 wickets (with 27 balls remaining)
Casey Fields, Melbourne
Umpires: Dale Ireland and Mattis van Eck
Player of the match: Katie Mack (Melbourne Stars)

- Melbourne Stars won the toss and elected to field

Match 21
19 December 2018
13:45
Scorecard

Melbourne Stars; 7/132 (20 overs)	v	Brisbane Heat; 0/138 (10.5 overs)
Angela Reakes 30 (30); Jess Jonassen 3/17 (4 overs)		Grace Harris 101* (42); Georgia Elwiss 0/8 (1 over)

Brisbane Heat won by 10 wickets (with 55 balls remaining)
The Gabba, Brisbane
Umpires: Steven Farrell and Stephen Dionysius
Player of the match: Grace Harris (Brisbane Heat)

- Melbourne Stars won the toss and elected to bat

Match 23
21 December 2018
16:00
Scorecard

Adelaide Strikers; 7/144 (20 overs)	v	Melbourne Stars; 6/145 (19.3 overs)
Sophie Devine 46 (36); Erin Osborne 2/16 (4 overs)		Erin Osborne 54* (45); Danielle Hazell 2/27 (2.3 overs)

Melbourne Stars won by 4 wickets (with 3 balls remaining)
Karen Rolton Oval, Adelaide
Umpires: Harry Singh and Eloise Sheridan
Player of the match: Erin Osborne (Melbourne Stars)

- Melbourne Stars won the toss and elected to field

Match 26
23 December
13:20
Scorecard

Adelaide Strikers; 3/172 (20 overs)	v	Melbourne Stars; 9/153 (20 overs)
Sophie Devine 95 (60); Annabel Sutherland 1/17 (3 overs)		Mignon du Preez 33 (27); Sophie Devine 5/41 (4 overs)

Adelaide Strikers won by 19 runs
Adelaide Oval, Adelaide
Umpires: Claire Polosak and Eloise Sheridan
Player of the match: Sophie Devine (Adelaide Strikers)

- Melbourne Stars won the toss and elected to field
- Broadcast by Seven Network and Fox Cricket

Match 34
29 December
14:50
Scorecard

Melbourne Stars; 130 (19.5 overs)	v	Melbourne Renegades; 9/131 (19.5 overs)
Lizelle Lee 36 (26); Amy Satterthwaite 3/16 (3 overs)		Amy Satterthwaite 37 (33); Holly Ferling 2/14 (3 overs)

Melbourne Renegades won by 1 wicket (with 1 ball remaining)
Marvel Stadium, Melbourne
Umpires: Daryl Brigham and Mattis van Eck
Player of the match: Amy Satterthwaite (Melbourne Renegades)

- Melbourne Renegades won the toss and elected to field

The Melbourne Renegades recorded the second one-wicket victory in the league's history when Lea Tahuhu, a fast bowler not known for her batting ability, hit the winning single off leg-spinning Stars captain Kristen Beams with just one ball to spare. Courtney Webb, on 21 not out, was the set batter at the non-striker's end.

Match 39
1 January
14:50
Scorecard

Melbourne Renegades; 5/149 (20 overs)	v	Melbourne Stars; 7/101 (20 overs)
Sophie Molineux 78* (54); Holly Ferling 2/30 (4 overs)		Georgia Elwiss 22 (25); Molly Strano 3/25 (4 overs)

Melbourne Renegades won by 48 runs
Melbourne Cricket Ground, Melbourne
Attendance:11,136
Umpires: Greg Azzopardi and Daryl Brigham
Player of the match: Sophie Molineux (Melbourne Renegades)

- Melbourne Stars won the toss and elected to field
- Played as a double-header before a men's BBL match

Match 42
5 January
14:00
Scorecard

Sydney Thunder; 3/92 (9.2 overs)	v	Melbourne Stars
Harmanpreet Kaur 21* (16); Holly Ferling 2/25 (3 overs)

No result
Blacktown International Sportspark, Sydney
Umpires: T Penman and Marc Nickl

- Sydney Thunder won the toss and elected to bat
- Match abandoned due to rain

Match 45
6 January
14:00
Scorecard

Sydney Thunder; 6/122 (20 overs)	v	Melbourne Stars; 9/117 (20 overs)
Nicola Carey 39* (32); Annabel Sutherland 2/17 (4 overs)		Angela Reakes 33 (38); Maisy Gibson 3/22 (4 overs)

Sydney Thunder won by 5 runs
Bankstown Oval, Sydney
Umpires: T Penman and Roberto Howard
Player of the match: Nicola Carey (Sydney Thunder)

- Melbourne Stars won the toss and elected to field

Match 50
10 January
12:50
Scorecard

Melbourne Stars; 88 (19.5 overs)	v	Brisbane Heat; 3/91 (8.4 overs)
Mignon du Preez 27 (35); Delissa Kimmince 4/18 (3.5 overs)		Jess Jonassen 34* (14); Annabel Sutherland 1/23 (3 overs)

Brisbane Heat won by 7 wickets (with 68 balls remaining)
The Gabba, Brisbane
Umpires: David Taylor and Claire Polosak
Player of the match: Sammy-Jo Johnson (Brisbane Heat)

- Brisbane Heat won the toss and elected to field
- Broadcast by Seven Network and Fox Cricket

Match 56
14 January
14:50
Scorecard

Sydney Sixers; 92 (19 overs)	v	Melbourne Stars; 5/96 (16.4 overs)
Alyssa Healy 35 (21); Kristen Beams 3/11 (3 overs)		Erin Osborne 34* (29); Marizanne Kapp 2/9 (4 overs)

Melbourne Stars won by 5 wickets (with 20 balls remaining)
Melbourne Cricket Ground, Melbourne
Umpires: Daryl Brigham and Donovan Koch
Player of the match: Alana King (Melbourne Stars)

- Sydney Sixers won the toss and elected to bat
- Broadcast by Seven Network and Fox Cricket

== Statistics and awards ==
- Most runs: Lizelle Lee – 276 (equal 19th in the league)
- Highest score in an innings: Lizelle Lee – 102* (56) vs Sydney Sixers, 1 December 2018
- Most wickets: Alana King – 15 (equal 10th in the league)
- Best bowling figures in an innings: Nicola Hancock – 4/22 (4 overs) vs Sydney Sixers, 1 December 2018
- Most catches (fielder): Alana King – 8 (equal 5th in the league)
- Player of the Match awards:
  - Erin Osborne – 2
  - Alana King, Lizelle Lee, Katie Mack – 1 each
- Stars Player of the Season: Alana King
