= 2018–19 Hobart Hurricanes WBBL season =

Hobart Hurricanes
2018–19 season
- Coach: Salliann Briggs
- Captain(s): Sasha Moloney
- Home ground: Blundstone Arena
- League: WBBL
- Record: 2–12 (8th)
- Finals: DNQ
- Leading Run Scorer: Heather Knight – 374
- Leading Wicket Taker: Brooke Hepburn – 15
- Player of the Season: Heather Knight

The 2018–19 Hobart Hurricanes Women's season was the fourth in the team's history. Coached by Salliann Briggs and captained by Sasha Moloney, the Hurricanes finished on the bottom of the WBBL 04 ladder. They consequently claimed their second-consecutive wooden spoon, having also finished last in the previous season.

== Squad ==
Each 2018–19 squad featured 15 active players, with an allowance of up to five marquee signings including a maximum of three from overseas. Under a new rule, Australian marquees were classed as players who held a national women's team contract at the time of signing on for their WBBL|04 team.

Personnel changes made before and during the season included:

- Salliann Briggs was appointed head coach of the Hurricanes, replacing Julia Price.
- Sasha Moloney assumed the captaincy, taking over from Corinne Hall.
- Indian marquee Veda Krishnamurthy and English marquee Lauren Winfield did not re-sign with the Hurricanes.
- English marquee Heather Knight returned to the Hurricanes after a season's absence.
- Barbadian marquee Hayley Matthews returned for her fourth season. Her campaign, however, was marred by injury. She did not play the first game due to a broken toe, and then missed the last eleven matches after sustaining a ruptured medial collateral ligament. English marquee Alex Hartley was signed as her replacement.
- Indian marquee Smriti Mandhana signed with the Hurricanes, having previously played for the Brisbane Heat.
- Nicola Hancock departed the Hurricanes, signing with the Melbourne Stars.
- Australian-born Celeste Raack, who also held an Irish passport, became ineligible to compete in the league as a local player after earning international selection for Ireland during 2018. The Hurricanes opted against signing her as an overseas marquee for WBBL|04, bringing her time with the team to an end.
- Rhiann O'Donnell signed with the Hurricanes, having spent prior seasons with the Melbourne Renegades.
- On 14 December 2018, Mikayla Hinkley, a former member of the Sydney Thunder and the Perth Scorchers, was brought into the squad as a replacement for Emma Thompson who would miss the season due to injury.

The table below lists the Hurricanes players and their key stats (including runs scored, batting strike rate, wickets taken, economy rate, catches and stumpings) for the season.

No.	Name	Nat.	Birth date	Batting style	Bowling style	G	R	SR	W	E	C	S	Notes
Batters
7	Stefanie Daffara	(Australia)	13 June 1995	Right-handed	Right-arm medium	12	167	113.60	–	–	2	–	
13	Ashley Day	(Australia)	17 September 1999	Right-handed	Right-arm leg spin	2	9	180.00	–	–	0	–	
3	Erin Fazackerley	(Australia)	3 July 1998	Right-handed	Right-arm medium	12	211	143.53	2	8.87	7	–	
27	Corinne Hall	(Australia)	12 October 1987	Right-handed	Right-arm off spin	14	229	112.25	–	–	8	–	
11	Mikayla Hinkley	(Australia)	1 May 1998	Right-handed	Right-arm medium	4	74	91.35	–	–	1	–	Replacement player
18	Smriti Mandhana	(India)	18 July 1996	Left-handed	Right-arm off spin	13	318	144.54	–	–	4	–	Overseas marquee
74	Emma Thompson	(Australia)	2 December 1990	Right-handed	Right-arm medium	–	–	–	–	–	–	–	
All-rounders
5	Heather Knight	(England)	26 December 1990	Right-handed	Right-arm off spin	13	374	121.82	14	7.57	11	–	Overseas marquee
50	Hayley Matthews	(Barbados)	19 March 1998	Right-handed	Right-arm off spin	2	60	130.43	2	5.75	0	–	Overseas marquee
99	Sasha Moloney	(Australia)	14 July 1992	Right-handed	Right-arm off spin	14	146	122.68	12	7.80	3	–	Captain
26	Rhiann O'Donnell	(Australia)	14 April 1998	Right-handed	Right-arm medium	6	9	100.00	2	12.00	7	–	
Wicket-keepers
8	Georgia Redmayne	(Australia)	8 December 1993	Left-handed	–	14	222	110.44	–	–	9	6	
Bowlers
9	Katelyn Fryett	(Australia)	28 May 1992	Right-handed	Right-arm fast medium	3	5	250.00	1	13.00	0	–	
65	Alex Hartley	(England)	6 September 1993	Right-handed	Left-arm orthodox	11	2	33.33	7	8.21	1	–	Overseas marquee (replacement)
12	Brooke Hepburn	(Australia)	4 October 1990	Right-handed	Right-arm medium	14	37	77.08	15	7.28	3	–	
10	Meg Phillips	(Australia)	2 February 1996	Right-handed	Right-arm medium	9	23	69.69	12	8.01	5	–	
4	Veronica Pyke	(Australia)	11 April 1981	Right-handed	Left-arm medium	11	49	111.36	8	7.10	1	–	

== Ladder ==
Pos	Team	Pld	W	L	NR	Pts	NRR
1	Sydney Sixers (RU)	14	10	4	0	20	0.509
2	Sydney Thunder	14	9	4	1	19	0.479
3	Brisbane Heat (C)	14	9	5	0	18	1.118
4	Melbourne Renegades	14	7	6	1	15	−0.079
5	Perth Scorchers	14	7	7	0	14	−0.476
6	Adelaide Strikers	14	5	8	1	11	−0.336
7	Melbourne Stars	14	5	8	1	11	−0.905
8	Hobart Hurricanes	14	2	12	0	4	−0.364

- The four top ranked teams qualified for the play-off phase

== Fixtures ==
All times are local time

Match 1
1 December 2018
10:40
Scorecard

Hobart Hurricanes; 7/143 (20 overs)	v	Perth Scorchers; 4/147 (19.3 overs)
Georgia Redmayne 49 (48); Heather Graham 3/25 (4 overs)		Elyse Villani 58 (39); Sasha Moloney 2/19 (3 overs)

Perth Scorchers won by 6 wickets (with 3 balls remaining)
CitiPower Centre, St Kilda
Umpires: Daryl Brigham and Darren Close
Player of the match: Elyse Villani (Perth Scorchers)

- Perth Scorchers won the toss and elected to field
- Broadcast by Seven Network and Fox Cricket

Match 6
8 December 2018
14:00
Scorecard

Hobart Hurricanes; 6/158 (20.0 overs)	v	Melbourne Stars; 5/159 (19.5 overs)
Heather Knight 82* (55); Annabel Sutherland 2/30 (4 overs)		Erin Osborne 67 (46); Hayley Matthews 2/23 (4 overs)

Melbourne Stars won by 5 wickets (with 1 ball remaining)
West Park Oval, Burnie
Umpires: Darren Close and Jeremiah Matibiri
Player of the match: Erin Osborne (Melbourne Stars)

- Melbourne Stars won the toss and elected to field

Match 10
9 December 2018
10:30
Scorecard

Hobart Hurricanes; 6/196 (20 overs)	v	Melbourne Stars; 124 (16.5 overs)
Smriti Mandhana 69 (41); Alana King 2/22 (3 overs)		Angela Reakes 31 (24); Heather Knight 3/10 (3 overs)

Hobart Hurricanes won by 72 runs
West Park, Burnie
Umpires: Darren Close and Jeremiah Matibiri
Player of the match: Smriti Mandhana (Hobart Hurricanes)

- Hobart Hurricanes won the toss and elected to bat

Match 15
15 December 2018
19:00 (D/N)
Scorecard

Hobart Hurricanes; 5/133 (15 overs)	v	Sydney Sixers; 3/155 (14.4 overs)
Heather Knight 51* (35); Marizanne Kapp 2/20 (3 overs)		Ashleigh Gardner 79* (50); Veronica Pyke 1/14 (1.4 overs)

Sydney Sixers won by 7 wickets (with 2 balls remaining) (D/L method)
Blundstone Arena, Hobart
Umpires: Jeremiah Matibiri and G Beechey
Player of the match: Ashleigh Gardner (Sydney Sixers)

- Sydney Sixers won the toss and elected to field
- Match reduced to 15 overs per team due to rain delay
- Sydney Sixers' target revised to 152

Match 18
16 December 2018
13:50
Scorecard

Sydney Sixers; 3/158 (20 overs)	v	Hobart Hurricanes; 141 (19.1 overs)
Ellyse Perry 72* (55); Rhiann O'Donnell 1/27 (4 overs)		Georgia Redmayne 47* (36); Marizanne Kapp 4/27 (4 overs)

Sydney Sixers won by 17 runs
Blundstone Arena, Hobart
Umpires: Muhammad Qureshi and Ben Treloar
Player of the match: Ellyse Perry (Sydney Sixers)

- Hobart Hurricanes won the toss and elected to field
- Broadcast by Seven Network and Fox Cricket

Match 20
18 December 2018
12:00
Scorecard

Hobart Hurricanes; 7/173 (20 overs)	v	Perth Scorchers; 6/173 (20 overs)
Smriti Mandhana 38 (23); Nicole Bolton 3/20 (4 overs)		Heather Graham 44* (30); Brooke Hepburn 2/22 (4 overs)

Match tied (Perth Scorchers won the one over eliminator)
Blundstone Arena, Hobart
Umpires: Muhammad Qureshi and Jeremiah Matibiri
Player of the match: Heather Graham (Perth Scorchers)

- Hobart Hurricanes won the toss and elected to bat

Match 22
21 December 2018
13:50
Scorecard

Hobart Hurricanes; 9/153 (20 overs)	v	Sydney Thunder; 4/156 (17.2 overs)
Erin Fazackerley 35 (21); Stafanie Taylor 3/24 (4 overs)		Naomi Stalenberg 55 (39); Heather Knight 2/25 (3 overs)

Sydney Thunder won by 6 wickets (with 16 balls remaining)
Manuka Oval, Canberra
Umpires: Darren Close and Andrew Crozier
Player of the match: Stafanie Taylor (Sydney Thunder)

- Sydney Thunder won the toss and elected to field
- Broadcast by Seven Network and Fox Cricket

Match 29
24 December
14:15
Scorecard

Hobart Hurricanes; 135 (19.4 overs)	v	Sydney Thunder; 4/136 (16.4 overs)
Smriti Mandhana 35 (22); Rene Farrell 2/20 (3.4 overs)		Rachael Haynes 68* (48); Brooke Hepburn 1/13 (3 overs)

Sydney Thunder won by 6 wickets (with 20 balls remaining)
Spotless Stadium, Sydney
Umpires: Ryan Nelson and Andrew Hamilton
Player of the match: Rachael Haynes (Sydney Thunder)

- Sydney Thunder won the toss and elected to field

Match 36
30 December
13:50
Scorecard

Brisbane Heat; 129 (19 overs)	v	Hobart Hurricanes; 5/133 (18.2 overs)
Grace Harris 23 (12); Meg Phillips 3/16 (4 overs)		Corinne Hall 48 (39); Grace Harris 3/23 (4 overs)

Hobart Hurricanes won by 5 wickets (with 10 balls remaining)
UTAS Stadium, Launceston
Umpires: Darren Close and Jeremiah Matibiri
Player of the match: Corinne Hall (Hobart Hurricanes)

- Hobart Hurricanes won the toss and elected to field
- Broadcast by Seven Network and Fox Cricket

Match 37
31 December
12:30
Scorecard

Brisbane Heat; 8/138 (20 overs)	v	Hobart Hurricanes; 80 (16.3 overs)
Josephine Dooley 44* (30); Meg Phillips 3/22 (4 overs)		Mikayla Hinkley 16 (25); Jess Jonassen 2/11 (3 overs)

Brisbane Heat won by 58 runs
UTAS Stadium, Launceston
Umpires: Muhammad Qureshi and Darren Close
Player of the match: Grace Harris (Brisbane Heat)

- Hobart Hurricanes won the toss and elected to field

Match 41
3 January
14:50
Scorecard

Hobart Hurricanes; 8/115 (20 overs)	v	Melbourne Renegades; 5/119 (18.1 overs)
Corinne Hall 37 (30); Sophie Molineux 2/22 (4 overs)		Amy Satterthwaite 27 (35); Sasha Moloney 3/20 (4 overs)

Melbourne Renegades won by 5 wickets (with 11 balls remaining)
GMHBA Stadium, Geelong
Umpires: Dale Ireland and David Shepard
Player of the match: Sophie Molineux (Melbourne Renegades)

- Hobart Hurricanes won the toss and elected to bat
- Broadcast by Seven Network and Fox Cricket

Match 48
8 January
13:40
Scorecard

Adelaide Strikers; 5/189 (20 overs)	v	Hobart Hurricanes; 8/189 (20 overs)
Sophie Devine 99* (53); Brooke Hepburn 2/28 (4 overs)		Georgia Redmayne 54* (37); Sarah Coyte 3/32 (4 overs)

Match tied (Adelaide Strikers won the one over eliminator)
Karen Rolton Oval, Adelaide
Umpires: Harry Singh and Craig Thomas
Player of the match: Sophie Devine (Adelaide Strikers)

- Hobart Hurricanes won the toss and elected to field

Match 49
9 January
13:40
Scorecard

Adelaide Strikers; 5/165 (20 overs)	v	Hobart Hurricanes; 9/141 (20 overs)
Tahlia McGrath 65 (39); Heather Knight 2/31 (4 overs)		Heather Knight 55 (39); Megan Schutt 3/21 (4 overs)

Adelaide Strikers won by 24 runs
Karen Rolton Oval, Adelaide
Umpires: Craig Thomas and Eloise Sheridan
Player of the match: Tahlia McGrath (Adelaide Strikers)

- Adelaide Strikers won the toss and elected to bat

Match 52
12 January
13:00
Scorecard

Melbourne Renegades; 6/146 (20 overs)	v	Hobart Hurricanes; 6/143 (20 overs)
Amy Satterthwaite 66 (57); Alex Hartley 3/21 (4 overs)		Erin Fazackerley 52 (41); Lea Tahuhu 1/18 (4 overs)

Melbourne Renegades won by 3 runs
CitiPower Centre, Melbourne
Umpires: Dale Ireland and Greg Azzopardi
Player of the match: Amy Satterthwaite (Melbourne Renegades)

- Hobart Hurricanes won the toss and elected to field

== Statistics and awards ==
- Most runs: Heather Knight – 374 (equal 9th in the league)
- Highest score in an innings: Heather Knight – 82* (55) vs Melbourne Stars, 8 December 2018
- Most wickets: Brooke Hepburn – 15 (equal 10th in the league)
- Best bowling figures in an innings: Heather Knight – 3/10 (3 overs) vs Melbourne Stars, 9 December 2018
- Most catches (fielder): Heather Knight – 11 (1st in the league)
- Player of the Match awards: Corinne Hall, Smriti Mandhana – 1 each
- Hurricanes Player of the Tournament: Heather Knight
