= 2018–19 Sydney Sixers WBBL season =

Sydney Sixers Women's Season 2018-19

Sydney Sixers
2018–19 season
- Sydney Sixers 2018–19 cap logo
- Coach: Ben Sawyer
- Captain(s): Ellyse Perry
- Home ground: Sydney Cricket Ground
- League: WBBL
- Record: 10–4 (1st)
- Finals: Runners-up
- Leading Run Scorer: Ellyse Perry – 778
- Leading Wicket Taker: Marizanne Kapp – 20
- Player of the Season: Ellyse Perry

The 2018–19 Sydney Sixers Women's season was the fourth in the team's history. Coached by Ben Sawyer, they finished the regular season of WBBL|04 on top of the ladder to claim their third-consecutive minor premiership while captain Ellyse Perry set a new Women's Big Bash League record for most runs in a single campaign and was named Player of the Tournament.

In the semi-finals, the Sixers won a "miracle" encounter against the Melbourne Renegades which was notable for a last-ball run out that forced the game into a super over. In the championship decider, the Sixers fell short of achieving a three-peat, losing a "classic" contest to the Brisbane Heat by three wickets.

== Squad ==
Each 2018–19 squad featured 15 active players, with an allowance of up to five marquee signings including a maximum of three from overseas.

Under a new rule, Australian marquees were classed as players who held a national women's team contract at the time of signing on for their WBBL|04 team. This, combined with the introduction of two-year contracts ahead of the previous season, meant that the Sixers would inadvertently exceed their marquee player limit in 2018–19. To address this inequity, an injured or unavailable Sixers marquee could only be replaced by a domestic player.

Personnel changes for the Sixers ahead of WBBL|04 included:

- Sarah Coyte returned to her original WBBL team, the Adelaide Strikers.
- Angela Reakes departed the team and subsequently joined the Melbourne Stars.
- Local teenage players Stella Campbell, Hayley Silver-Holmes and Tahlia Wilson were added to the roster.

The table below lists the Sixers players and their key stats (including runs scored, batting strike rate, wickets taken, economy rate, catches and stumpings) for the season.

No.	Name	Nat.	Birth date	Batting style	Bowling style	G	R	SR	W	E	C	S	Notes
Batters
6	Ashleigh Gardner	(Australia)	15 April 1997	Right-handed	Right-arm off spin	16	337	115.01	3	8.34	2	–	Australian marquee
28	Sara McGlashan	(New Zealand)	28 March 1982	Right-handed	–	16	69	85.81	–	–	5	–	Overseas marquee
21	Tahlia Wilson	(Australia)	21 October 1999	Right-handed	–	5	5	62.50	–	–	1	–	
All-rounders
29	Erin Burns	(Australia)	22 June 1988	Right-handed	Right-arm off spin	16	250	129.53	11	6.53	5	–	
13	Clara Iemma	(Australia)	31 October 1998	Left-handed	Right-arm off spin	–	–	–	–	–	–	–	
8	Ellyse Perry	(Australia)	3 November 1990	Right-handed	Right-arm fast	16	778	121.21	10	6.89	9	–	Captain, Australian marquee
20	Dane van Niekerk	(South Africa)	14 May 1993	Right-handed	Right-arm leg spin	16	174	116.77	19	6.70	3	–	Overseas marquee
Wicket-keeper
77	Alyssa Healy	(Australia)	24 March 1990	Right-handed	–	16	445	141.71	–	–	11	6	Australian marquee
Bowlers
3	Sarah Aley	(Australia)	3 June 1984	Right-handed	Right-arm medium	11	2	33.33	4	8.52	3	–	
18	Stella Campbell	(Australia)	15 June 2002	Right-handed	Right-arm fast medium	–	–	–	–	–	–	–	
5	Lauren Cheatle	(Australia)	6 November 1998	Left-handed	Left-arm fast medium	16	9	81.81	14	6.97	0	–	Australian marquee
17	Marizanne Kapp	(South Africa)	4 January 1990	Right-handed	Right-arm fast medium	16	67	91.78	20	5.80	2	–	Overseas marquee
74	Carly Leeson	(Australia)	9 November 1998	Right-handed	Right-arm medium	2	4	66.66	–	–	1	–	
4	Hayley Silver-Holmes	(Australia)	18 August 2003	Right-handed	Right-arm fast medium	14	7	50.00	3	9.72	5	–	
2	Lauren Smith	(Australia)	6 October 1996	Right-handed	Right-arm off spin	16	40	78.43	10	6.85	6	–	

== Ladder ==
Pos	Team	Pld	W	L	NR	Pts	NRR
1	Sydney Sixers (RU)	14	10	4	0	20	0.509
2	Sydney Thunder	14	9	4	1	19	0.479
3	Brisbane Heat (C)	14	9	5	0	18	1.118
4	Melbourne Renegades	14	7	6	1	15	−0.079
5	Perth Scorchers	14	7	7	0	14	−0.476
6	Adelaide Strikers	14	5	8	1	11	−0.336
7	Melbourne Stars	14	5	8	1	11	−0.905
8	Hobart Hurricanes	14	2	12	0	4	−0.364

- The four top ranked teams qualified for the play-off phase

== Fixtures ==
All times are local time

=== Regular season ===
Match 2
1 December 2018
13:50
Scorecard

Sydney Sixers; 7/165 (20 overs)	v	Melbourne Stars; 3/166 (17.2 overs)
Alyssa Healy 70 (47); Nicola Hancock 4/22 (4 overs)		Lizelle Lee 102 (56); Dane van Niekerk 1/22 (3 overs)

Melbourne Stars won by 7 wickets (with 16 balls remaining)
CitiPower Centre, St Kilda
Umpires: Mattis van Eck and Michael Graham-Smith
Player of the match: Lizelle Lee (Melbourne Stars)

- Sydney Sixers won the toss and elected to bat
- Broadcast by Seven Network and Fox Cricket

Match 5
7 December 2018
19:10 (D/N)
Scorecard

Perth Scorchers; 9/167 (20.0 overs)	v	Sydney Sixers; 4/171 (18.4 overs)
Amy Jones 57 (29); Dane van Niekerk 3/32 (4 overs)		Ellyse Perry 102* (59); Heather Graham 2/33 (3.4 overs)

Sydney Sixers won by 6 wickets (with 8 balls remaining)
North Sydney Oval No. 1
Umpires: Simon Lightbody and Marc Nickl
Player of the match: Ellyse Perry (Sydney Sixers)

- Perth Scorchers won the toss and elected to bat
- Broadcast by Seven Network and Fox Cricket

Match 9
8 December 2018
19:10 (D/N)
Scorecard

Sydney Sixers; 4/168 (20 overs)	v	Sydney Thunder; 7/132 (20 overs)
Ellyse Perry 75* (66); Stafanie Taylor 2/16 (3 overs)		Harmanpreet Kaur 45 (28); Ellyse Perry 2/11 (3 overs)

Sydney Sixers won by 36 runs
North Sydney Oval No. 1
Umpires: Marc Nickl and Donovan Koch
Player of the match: Ellyse Perry (Sydney Sixers)

- Sydney Sixers won the toss and elected to bat
- Broadcast by Seven Network and Fox Cricket

Match 15
15 December 2018
19:00 (D/N)
Scorecard

Hobart Hurricanes; 5/133 (15 overs)	v	Sydney Sixers; 3/155 (14.4 overs)
Heather Knight 51* (35); Marizanne Kapp 2/20 (3 overs)		Ashleigh Gardner 79* (50); Veronica Pyke 1/14 (1.4 overs)

Sydney Sixers won by 7 wickets (with 2 balls remaining) (D/L method)
Blundstone Arena, Hobart
Umpires: Jeremiah Matibiri and G Beechey
Player of the match: Ashleigh Gardner (Sydney Sixers)

- Sydney Sixers won the toss and elected to field
- Match reduced to 15 overs per team due to rain delay
- Sydney Sixers' target revised to 152

Match 18
16 December 2018
13:50
Scorecard

Sydney Sixers; 3/158 (20 overs)	v	Hobart Hurricanes; 141 (19.1 overs)
Ellyse Perry 72* (55); Rhiann O'Donnell 1/27 (4 overs)		Georgia Redmayne 47* (36); Marizanne Kapp 4/27 (4 overs)

Sydney Sixers won by 17 runs
Blundstone Arena, Hobart
Umpires: Muhammad Qureshi and Ben Treloar
Player of the match: Ellyse Perry (Sydney Sixers)

- Hobart Hurricanes won the toss and elected to field
- Broadcast by Seven Network and Fox Cricket

Match 24
22 December
11:10
Scorecard

Sydney Sixers; 3/166 (20 overs)	v	Brisbane Heat; 7/155 (20 overs)
Ellyse Perry 103* (64); Delissa Kimmince 1/25 (4 overs)		Jess Jonassen 33 (27); Erin Burns 2/9 (2 overs)

Sydney Sixers won by 11 runs
Sydney Cricket Ground, Sydney
Umpires: Andrew Hamilton and Berend du Plessis
Player of the match: Ellyse Perry (Sydney Sixers)

- Sydney Sixers won the toss and elected to bat

Match 27
23 December
14:10
Scorecard

Brisbane Heat; 7/154 (20 overs)	v	Sydney Sixers; 88 (18 overs)
Sammy-Jo Johnson 51 (30); Erin Burns 3/20 (4 overs)		Dane van Niekerk 25 (33); Sammy-Jo Johnson 3/23 (4 overs)

Brisbane Heat won by 66 runs
Hurstville Oval, Sydney
Umpires: Roberto Howard and Berend du Plessis
Player of the match: Sammy-Jo Johnson (Brisbane Heat)

- Brisbane Heat won the toss and elected to bat

Match 31
27 December
14:50
Scorecard

Melbourne Renegades; 8/110 (20 overs)	v	Sydney Sixers; 3/111 (14.1 overs)
Maitlan Brown 33 (30); Lauren Cheatle 2/6 (2 overs)		Alyssa Healy 70* (42); Molly Strano 3/26 (4 overs)

Sydney Sixers won by 7 wickets (with 35 balls remaining)
Sydney Cricket Ground, Sydney
Umpires: Berend du Plessis and Ryan Nelson
Player of the match: Alyssa Healy (Sydney Sixers)

- Melbourne Renegades won the toss and elected to bat

Match 32
28 December
14:10
Scorecard

Sydney Sixers; 1/206 (20 overs)	v	Adelaide Strikers; 132 (19.1 overs)
Alyssa Healy 112* (69); Tahlia McGrath 0/19 (2 overs)		Suzie Bates 46 (36); Lauren Cheatle 3/22 (4 overs)

Sydney Sixers won by 74 runs
Hurstville Oval, Sydney
Umpires: T Penman and Ryan Nelson
Player of the match: Alyssa Healy (Sydney Sixers)

- Adelaide Strikers won the toss and elected to field

Match 38
31 December
13:20
Scorecard

Sydney Sixers; 4/147 (20 overs)	v	Adelaide Strikers; 8/139 (20 overs)
Ashleigh Gardner 49 (38); Amanda-Jade Wellington 2/19 (4 overs)		Suzie Bates 60 (58); Dane van Niekerk 2/12 (4 overs)

Sydney Sixers won by 8 runs
Adelaide Oval, Adelaide
Umpires: Claire Polosak and Eloise Sheridan
Player of the match: Dane van Niekerk (Sydney Sixers)

- Sydney Sixers won the toss and elected to bat
- Broadcast by Seven Network and Fox Cricket

Match 40
2 January
14:50
Scorecard

Sydney Sixers; 7/98 (20 overs)	v	Sydney Thunder; 2/101 (17.4 overs)
Marizanne Kapp 40 (41); Rachel Trenaman 2/11 (4 overs)		Naomi Stalenberg 44 (50); Marizanne Kapp 1/13 (4 overs)

Sydney Thunder won by 8 wickets (with 14 balls remaining)
Spotless Stadium, Sydney
Umpires: Ryan Nelson and Ben Treloar
Player of the match: Lisa Griffith (Sydney Thunder)

- Sydney Thunder won the toss and elected to field
- Broadcast by Seven Network and Fox Cricket

Match 44
6 January
10:00
Scorecard

Sydney Sixers; 2/183 (20 overs)	v	Perth Scorchers; 151 (19.4 overs)
Ellyse Perry 80* (54); Piepa Cleary 1/27 (3 overs)		Meg Lanning 76 (51); Lauren Cheatle 2/19 (4 overs)

Sydney Sixers won by 32 runs
Lilac Hill Park, Perth
Umpires: Dean Trigg and Trent Steenholdt
Player of the match: Ellyse Perry (Sydney Sixers)

- Sydney Sixers won the toss and elected to bat

Match 55
13 January
14:50
Scorecard

Sydney Sixers; 2/136 (20 overs)	v	Melbourne Renegades; 8/107 (20 overs)
Ellyse Perry 67* (62); Georgia Wareham 1/26 (3 overs)		Jess Duffin 39 (39); Marizanne Kapp 2/19 (4 overs)

Sydney Sixers won by 29 runs
GMHBA Stadium, Geelong
Umpires: Daryl Brigham and Mattis van Eck
Player of the match: Erin Burns (Sydney Sixers)

- Sydney Sixers won the toss and elected to bat

Match 56
14 January
14:50
Scorecard

Sydney Sixers; 92 (19 overs)	v	Melbourne Stars; 5/96 (16.4 overs)
Alyssa Healy 35 (21); Kristen Beams 3/11 (3 overs)		Erin Osborne 34* (29); Marizanne Kapp 2/9 (4 overs)

Melbourne Stars won by 5 wickets (with 20 balls remaining)
Melbourne Cricket Ground, Melbourne
Umpires: Daryl Brigham and Donovan Koch
Player of the match: Alana King (Melbourne Stars)

- Sydney Sixers won the toss and elected to bat
- Broadcast by Seven Network and Fox Cricket

=== Knockout phase ===
Semi-final 2
19 January
13:50
Scorecard

Sydney Sixers; 4/131 (20 overs)	v	Melbourne Renegades; 6/131 (20 overs)
Ellyse Perry 54* (59); Lea Tahuhu 1/18 (4 overs)		Sophie Molineux 55 (54); Erin Burns 2/13 (3 overs)

Match tied (Sydney Sixers won in a super over)
Drummoyne Oval, Sydney
Umpires: Claire Polosak and Donovan Koch
Player of the match: Ellyse Perry (Sydney Sixers)

- Sydney Sixers won the toss and elected to bat
- Broadcast by Seven Network and Fox Cricket
- Ellyse Perry became the first player to score 700 runs in a WBBL season

In the Renegades' first finals appearance, with three runs required off the last ball for an upset victory, Sophie Molineux was found short of her ground attempting the winning run due to a "miracle" piece of team fielding by Sixers players Erin Burns, Sarah Aley and Alyssa Healy. In the resulting super over, Sixers captain Ellyse Perry hit a six off Molly Strano to eliminate the Renegades from the tournament. The match, in conjunction with the other semi-final played earlier in the day, was hailed as a showcase of "the irrefutable rise of women's cricket" and "sport with drama, skill and unpredictability – a potent recipe for success".

Final
26 January
10:10
Scorecard

Sydney Sixers; 7/131 (20 overs)	v	Brisbane Heat; 7/132 (19.2 overs)
Ellyse Perry 33 (37); Grace Harris 3/23 (4 overs)		Beth Mooney 65 (46); Erin Burns 2/25 (4 overs)

Brisbane Heat won by 3 wickets (with 4 balls remaining)
Drummoyne Oval, Sydney
Attendance: 5,368
Umpires: David Shepard and Donovan Koch
Player of the match: Beth Mooney (Brisbane Heat)

- Sydney Sixers won the toss and elected to bat
- Broadcast by Seven Network and Fox Cricket
- Brisbane Heat won their first title

In front of the league's first-ever sellout crowd, the visiting Brisbane Heat pulled off an upset victory to win their maiden championship and deny a Sixers three-peat. Requiring 34 runs with 36 balls remaining, the Heat looked to be in control of the chase until the 15th over when Dane van Niekerk struck twice—including the removal of linchpin Beth Mooney for 65 through a forward-diving catch by Ellyse Perry in the outfield. Although Brisbane would continue to lose wickets, Laura Harris did enough to steady the ship, eventually hitting the winning runs with three wickets and four deliveries to spare. Player of the Final Mooney, who had been receiving on-field medical treatment for the flu and heat stroke, revealed in a post-match interview that her ongoing game delays instigated sledging from several opponents: "It was kind of nice to know while I wasn't feeling well, I was going well enough to piss them off and they were getting frustrated at how long I was taking to face up... I've played enough cricket against (the Sixers) to know what gets under their skin and we definitely won that battle."

== Statistics and awards ==
- Most runs: Ellyse Perry – 778 (1st in the league)
- Highest score in an innings: Alyssa Healy – 112* (69) vs Adelaide Strikers, 28 December 2018
- Most wickets: Marizanne Kapp – 20 (equal 3rd in the league)
- Best bowling figures in an innings: Marizanne Kapp – 4/27 (4 overs) vs Hobart Hurricanes, 16 December 2018
- Most catches (fielder): Ellyse Perry – 9 (equal 2nd in the league)
- Player of the Match awards:
  - Ellyse Perry – 6
  - Alyssa Healy – 2
  - Erin Burns, Ashleigh Gardner, Dane van Niekerk – 1 each
- Sixers Player of the Tournament: Ellyse Perry
- WBBL|04 Player of the Tournament: Ellyse Perry (1st)
- WBBL|04 Team of the Tournament: Alyssa Healy, Marizanne Kapp, Ellyse Perry
