= 2018–19 Women's Big Bash League season =

2018–19 Women's Big Bash League
- 2018–19 WBBL season logo
- Dates: 1 December 2018 – 26 January 2019
- Administrator: Cricket Australia
- Cricket format: Twenty20
- Tournament format(s): Double round robin and knockout finals
- Champions: Brisbane Heat (1st title)
- Runners-up: Sydney Sixers
- Participants: 8
- Matches: 59
- Attendance: 135,861 (2,303 per match)
- Player of the series: Ellyse Perry (SYS)
- Most runs: Ellyse Perry (SYS) – 778
- Most wickets: Heather Graham (PRS) – 22; Delissa Kimmince (BRH) – 22
- Official website: WBBL

The 2018–19 Women's Big Bash League season or WBBL|04 was the fourth season of the Women's Big Bash League (WBBL), the semi-professional women's Twenty20 domestic cricket competition in Australia. The tournament ran from 1 December 2018 to 26 January 2019.

Double-defending champions, the Sydney Sixers, ended the regular season on top of the ladder, while captain Ellyse Perry broke the scoring record for a sole WBBL campaign and was named Player of the Tournament.

In the two semi-finals at Drummoyne Oval on 19 January, the Brisbane Heat eliminated the Sydney Thunder before the Sydney Sixers knocked out the Melbourne Renegades. Both matches, notable for their "miracle" endings, were hailed as a showcase of "the irrefutable rise of women's cricket" and "sport with drama, skill and unpredictability – a potent recipe for success".

In the final, also at Drummoyne Oval, the Heat caused an upset by defeating the Sixers with three wickets in hand and four balls remaining to claim their maiden title. Despite suffering from the flu and heat stroke, Beth Mooney managed to play a pivotal innings of 65 runs from 46 balls and was named Player of the Final.

== Teams ==
Each squad featured 15 active players, with an allowance of up to five marquee signings including a maximum of three from overseas. Under a new rule, Australian marquees were defined as players who held a national women's team contract at the time of signing on for their WBBL|04 team. This, combined with the introduction of two-year contracts ahead of the previous season, meant that the Sydney Sixers would inadvertently exceed their marquee player limit in 2018–19. To address this inequity, an injured or unavailable Sixers marquee could only be replaced by a domestic player.

Team	Home ground (Note: Number of games hosted at each venue is indicated in brackets)	Secondary grounds	Coach	Captain	Australian representatives (Note: Only includes players who debuted for Australia before the tournament)	Overseas players
Adelaide Strikers	Karen Rolton Oval (3)	Adelaide Oval (2); Albrecht Oval (2)	Andrea McCauley	Suzie Bates	Megan Schutt; Amanda-Jade Wellington; Sarah Coyte (Note: Player did not hold a Cricket Australia contract at the beginning of the WBBL|04 signing period); Tahlia McGrath	Suzie Bates; Sophie Devine; Danielle Hazell
Brisbane Heat	The Gabba (2)	Harrup Park (2); Cazaly's Stadium (1)	Peter McGiffin	Kirby Short	Jess Jonassen; Beth Mooney; Grace Harris; Delissa Kimmince	Suné Luus; Laura Wolvaardt
Hobart Hurricanes	Blundstone Arena (3)	UTAS Stadium (2); West Park Oval (2)	Salliann Briggs	Sasha Moloney	–	Heather Knight; Smriti Mandhana; Hayley Matthews; Alex Hartley (Note: Replacement player)
Melbourne Renegades	CitiPower Centre (3)	GMHBA Stadium (2); Eastern Oval (1); Geelong Cricket Ground (1); Marvel Stadium (1)	Tim Coyle	Amy Satterthwaite	Jess Duffin; Sophie Molineux; Molly Strano; Tayla Vlaeminck; Georgia Wareham	Amy Satterthwaite; Lea Tahuhu; Danielle Wyatt
Melbourne Stars	Melbourne Cricket Ground (2)	Casey Fields (2); CitiPower Centre (1)	David Hemp	Kristen Beams (Note: Erin Osborne stood in as acting captain for eight games.)	Kristen Beams; Holly Ferling; Erin Osborne	Mignon du Preez; Georgia Elwiss; Lizelle Lee; Katey Martin
Perth Scorchers	Lilac Hill Park (3)	WACA Ground (2); Optus Stadium (1)	Lisa Keightley	Meg Lanning (Note: Elyse Villani stood in as acting captain for five games.)	Nicole Bolton; Meg Lanning; Elyse Villani; Lauren Ebsary	Kate Cross; Amy Jones; Hayley Jensen
Sydney Sixers	Sydney Cricket Ground (2)	Drummoyne Oval (2); Hurstville Oval (2); North Sydney Oval (2)	Ben Sawyer	Ellyse Perry	Lauren Cheatle; Ashleigh Gardner; Alyssa Healy; Ellyse Perry; Sarah Aley	Marizanne Kapp; Sara McGlashan; Dane van Niekerk
Sydney Thunder	Spotless Stadium (3)	Bankstown Oval (1); Blacktown ISP Oval (1); Drummoyne Oval (1); Manuka Oval (1); North Sydney Oval (1)	Joanne Broadbent	Alex Blackwell	Alex Blackwell; Rachael Haynes; Nicola Carey; Rene Farrell; Naomi Stalenberg; Belinda Vakarewa	Harmanpreet Kaur; Rachel Priest; Stafanie Taylor

=== Personnel changes ===
==== Local players ====
The table below lists local player movements made ahead of the season.

Player	Departed	→	Joined	Notes	Ref(s)
Sarah Coyte	Sydney Sixers	→	Adelaide Strikers	Returning to the Adelaide Strikers	
Holly Ferling	Brisbane Heat	→	Melbourne Stars		
Rhiann O'Donnell	Melbourne Renegades	→	Hobart Hurricanes		
Nicola Hancock	Hobart Hurricanes	→	Melbourne Stars	Third WBBL club (previously played for the Melbourne Renegades)	
Celeste Raack	Hobart Hurricanes	→	–	No longer eligible as a local player due to recent international appearances for Ireland	
Anna Lanning	Melbourne Stars	→	Melbourne Renegades		
Kris Britt	Melbourne Renegades	→	–	Retired	
Hayley Jensen	Melbourne Renegades	→	–	No longer eligible as a local player due to recent international appearances for New Zealand; Signed as an overseas marquee replacement player for the Perth Scorchers during the season	
Angela Reakes	Sydney Sixers	→	Melbourne Stars		
Hayleigh Brennan	Melbourne Stars	→	Perth Scorchers		
Gemma Triscari	Melbourne Stars	→	–	Retired	
Mikayla Hinkley	Perth Scorchers	→	–	Signed as a replacement player for the Hobart Hurricanes during the season	

Changes made during the season included:

- Mikayla Hinkley (who had previously played for the Sydney Thunder and Perth Scorchers) signed with the Hobart Hurricanes as a replacement player.

==== Overseas players ====
The table below lists changes to overseas player allocations made ahead of the season.

Player	Departed	→	Joined	Notes	Ref(s)
Danielle Hazell	–	→	Adelaide Strikers	Previously played for the Melbourne Stars	
Tammy Beaumont	Adelaide Strikers	→	–		
Suné Luus	–	→	Brisbane Heat		
Deandra Dottin	Brisbane Heat	→	–		
Alex Hartley	–	→	Hobart Hurricanes	Replacement player	
Heather Knight	–	→	Hobart Hurricanes	Returning to the Hobart Hurricanes	
Smriti Mandhana	–	→	Hobart Hurricanes	Previously played for the Brisbane Heat	
Lauren Winfield	Hobart Hurricanes	→	–		
Veda Krishnamurthy	Hobart Hurricanes	→	–		
Danni Wyatt	–	→	Melbourne Renegades	Returning to the Melbourne Renegades	
Chamari Atapattu	Melbourne Renegades	→	–		
Kate Cross	–	→	Perth Scorchers	Previously played for the Brisbane Heat	
Amy Jones	Sydney Sixers	→	Perth Scorchers	Replacement player in WBBL|03	
Katherine Brunt	Perth Scorchers	→	–		
Nat Sciver	Perth Scorchers	→	–		
Thamsyn Newton	Perth Scorchers	→	–	Replacement player in WBBL|03	

Changes made during the season included:

- New Zealand marquee Hayley Jensen (who had previously played for the Melbourne Stars and Melbourne Renegades) signed with the Perth Scorchers as a replacement player.
- New Zealand marquee Katey Martin signed with the Melbourne Stars as a replacement player. Martin had performed a similar role with the Melbourne Stars in WBBL|03.

==== Leadership ====
Coaching changes made ahead of the season included:

- Salliann Briggs was appointed head coach of the Hobart Hurricanes, replacing Julia Price.

Captaincy changes made ahead of the season included:

- Sasha Moloney was appointed captain of the Hobart Hurricanes, replacing Corinne Hall.
- Meg Lanning assumed the captaincy of the Perth Scorchers, replacing Elyse Villani.

Captaincy changes made during the season included:

- Erin Osborne stood in as acting captain of the Melbourne Stars for eight games, replacing Kristen Beams who was sidelined with Achilles and finger injuries.
- Elyse Villani stood in as acting captain of the Perth Scorchers for five games, replacing Meg Lanning who was sidelined with a back injury.

== Standings ==
=== Points table ===
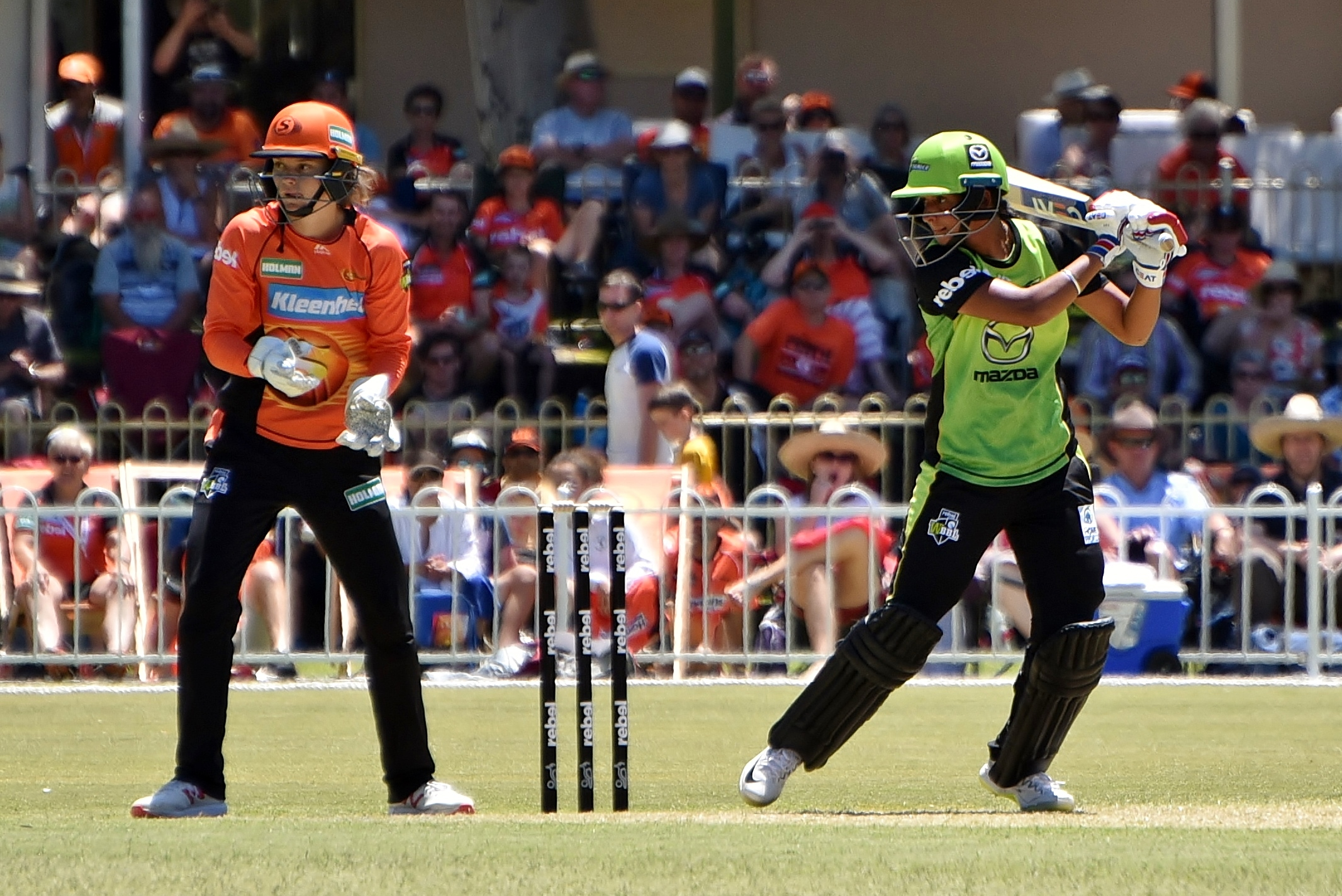
Indian international Harmanpreet Kaur hits out for Sydney Thunder against Perth Scorchers at Lilac Hill Park, Perth, on 29 December 2018. The Scorchers' wicket-keeper, England international Amy Jones, looks on. The Scorchers later scored 4/180 to win the match by six wickets, with just one ball remaining.

Pos	Team	Pld	W	L	NR	Pts	NRR
1	Sydney Sixers (RU)	14	10	4	0	20	0.509
2	Sydney Thunder	14	9	4	1	19	0.479
3	Brisbane Heat (C)	14	9	5	0	18	1.118
4	Melbourne Renegades	14	7	6	1	15	−0.079
5	Perth Scorchers	14	7	7	0	14	−0.476
6	Adelaide Strikers	14	5	8	1	11	−0.336
7	Melbourne Stars	14	5	8	1	11	−0.905
8	Hobart Hurricanes	14	2	12	0	4	−0.364

- The four top ranked teams qualified for the play-off phase

=== Win–loss table ===
Below is a summary of results for each team's fourteen regular season matches, plus finals where applicable, in chronological order. A team's opponent for any given match is listed above the margin of victory/defeat.

Team	1	2	3	4	5	6	7	8	9	10	11	12	13	14	SF	F	Pos.
Adelaide Strikers (ADS)	BRH; 36 runs	MLR; 6 wkts	MLR; N/R	SYT; 6 wkts	SYT; 5 wkts	MLS; 4 wkts	MLS; 19 runs	SYS; 74 runs	SYS; 8 runs	BRH; 43 runs	HBH; S/O	HBH; 24 runs	PRS; 30 runs	PRS; 10 wkts	X	X	6th
Brisbane Heat (BRH)	ADS; 36 runs	PRS; 7 wkts	SYT; 28 runs	MLR; 21 runs	MLS; 10 wkts	SYS; 11 runs	SYS; 66 runs	PRS; 5 wkts	HBH; 5 wkts	HBH; 58 runs	ADS; 43 runs	MLR; 25 runs	MLS; 7 wkts	SYT; 3 wkts	SYT; 4 runs	SYS; 3 wkts	3rd (C)
Hobart Hurricanes (HBH)	PRS; 6 wkts	MLS; 5 wkts	MLS; 72 runs	SYS; 7 wkts	SYS; 17 runs	PRS; S/O	SYT; 6 wkts	SYT; 6 wkts	BRH; 5 wkts	BRH; 58 runs	MLR; 5 wkts	ADS; S/O	ADS; 24 runs	MLR; 3 runs	X	X	8th
Melbourne Renegades (MLR)	SYT; 6 wkts	ADS; 6 wkts	ADS; N/R	BRH; 21 runs	PRS; 4 wkts	PRS; 15 runs	SYS; 7 wkts	MLS; 1 wkt	MLS; 48 runs	HBH; 5 wkts	BRH; 25 runs	SYT; 6 wkts	HBH; 3 runs	SYS; 29 runs	SYS; S/O	X	4th (SF)
Melbourne Stars (MLS)	SYS; 7 wkts	HBH; 5 wkts	HBH; 72 runs	PRS; 8 wkts	PRS; 4 wkts	BRH; 10 wkts	ADS; 4 wtks	ADS; 19 runs	MLR; 1 wkt	MLR; 48 runs	SYT; N/R	SYT; 5 runs	BRH; 7 wkts	SYS; 5 wkts	X	X	7th
Perth Scorchers (PRS)	HBH; 6 wkts	SYS; 6 wkts	BRH; 7 wkts	MLS; 8 wkts	MLS; 4 wkts	HBH; S/O	MLR; 4 wkts	MLR; 15 runs	BRH; 5 wkts	SYT; 6 wkts	SYT; 3 runs	SYS; 32 runs	ADS; 30 runs	ADS; 10 wkts	X	X	5th
Sydney Sixers (SYS)	MLS; 7 wkts	PRS; 6 wkts	SYT; 36 runs	HBH; 7 wkts	HBH; 17 runs	BRH; 11 runs	BRH; 66 runs	MLR; 7 wkts	ADS; 74 runs	ADS; 8 runs	SYT; 8 wkts	PRS; 32 runs	MLR; 29 runs	MLS; 5 wkts	MLR; S/O	BRH; 3 wkts	1st (RU)
Sydney Thunder (SYT)	MLR; 6 wkts	SYS; 36 runs	BRH; 28 runs	ADS; 6 wkts	ADS; 5 wkts	HBH; 6 wkts	HBH; 6 wkts	PRS; 6 wkts	PRS; 3 runs	SYS; 8 wkts	MLS; N/R	MLS; 5 runs	MLR; 6 wkts	BRH; 3 wkts	BRH; 4 runs	X	2nd (SF)

Team's results→	Won	Tied	Lost	N/R

== Fixtures ==
All times are local time

=== Week 1 ===
Match 1
1 December 2018
10:40
Scorecard

Hobart Hurricanes; 7/143 (20 overs)	v	Perth Scorchers; 4/147 (19.3 overs)
Georgia Redmayne 49 (48); Heather Graham 3/25 (4 overs)		Elyse Villani 58 (39); Sasha Moloney 2/19 (3 overs)

Perth Scorchers won by 6 wickets (with 3 balls remaining)
CitiPower Centre, St Kilda
Umpires: Daryl Brigham and Darren Close
Player of the match: Elyse Villani (Perth Scorchers)

- Perth Scorchers won the toss and elected to field
- Broadcast by Seven Network and Fox Cricket

Match 2
1 December 2018
13:50
Scorecard

Sydney Sixers; 7/165 (20 overs)	v	Melbourne Stars; 3/166 (17.2 overs)
Alyssa Healy 70 (47); Nicola Hancock 4/22 (4 overs)		Lizelle Lee 102 (56); Dane van Niekerk 1/22 (3 overs)

Melbourne Stars won by 7 wickets (with 16 balls remaining)
CitiPower Centre, St Kilda
Umpires: Mattis van Eck and Michael Graham-Smith
Player of the match: Lizelle Lee (Melbourne Stars)

- Sydney Sixers won the toss and elected to bat
- Broadcast by Seven Network and Fox Cricket

Match 3
2 December 2018
10:40
Scorecard

Adelaide Strikers; 7/172 (20 overs)	v	Brisbane Heat; 2/136 (20 overs)
Sophie Devine 89 (55); Jemma Barsby 2/23 (4 overs)		Beth Mooney 63* (57); Megan Schutt 1/23 (4 overs)

Adelaide Strikers won by 36 runs
CitiPower Centre, St Kilda
Umpires: Dale Ireland and Ben Treloar
Player of the match: Sophie Devine (Adelaide Strikers)

- Brisbane Heat won the toss and elected to field
- Broadcast by Seven Network and Fox Cricket

Match 4
2 December 2018
13:50
Scorecard

Melbourne Renegades; 8/98 (20 overs)	v	Sydney Thunder; 4/99 (16.5 overs)
Erica Kershaw 24 (27); Rene Farrell 3/17 (4 overs)		Rachael Haynes 27 (25); Tayla Vlaeminck 4/29 (3.5 overs)

Sydney Thunder won by 6 wickets (with 19 balls remaining)
CitiPower Centre, St Kilda
Umpires: Greg Azzopardi and David Shepard
Player of the match: Rene Farrell (Sydney Thunder)

- Sydney Thunder won the toss and elected to field
- Broadcast by Seven Network and Fox Cricket

Match 5
7 December 2018
19:10 (D/N)
Scorecard

Perth Scorchers; 9/167 (20.0 overs)	v	Sydney Sixers; 4/171 (18.4 overs)
Amy Jones 57 (29); Dane van Niekerk 3/32 (4 overs)		Ellyse Perry 102* (59); Heather Graham 2/33 (3.4 overs)

Sydney Sixers won by 6 wickets (with 8 balls remaining)
North Sydney Oval No. 1
Umpires: Simon Lightbody and Marc Nickl
Player of the match: Ellyse Perry (Sydney Sixers)

- Perth Scorchers won the toss and elected to bat
- Broadcast by Seven Network and Fox Cricket

=== Week 2 ===
Match 6
8 December 2018
14:00
Scorecard

Hobart Hurricanes; 6/158 (20.0 overs)	v	Melbourne Stars; 5/159 (19.5 overs)
Heather Knight 82* (55); Annabel Sutherland 2/30 (4 overs)		Erin Osborne 67 (46); Hayley Matthews 2/23 (4 overs)

Melbourne Stars won by 5 wickets (with 1 ball remaining)
West Park Oval, Burnie
Umpires: Darren Close and Jeremiah Matibiri
Player of the match: Erin Osborne (Melbourne Stars)

- Melbourne Stars won the toss and elected to field

Match 7
8 December 2018
14:10
Scorecard

Adelaide Strikers; 7/153 (20.0 overs)	v	Melbourne Renegades; 4/154 (20.0 overs)
Suzie Bates 54 (44); Georgia Wareham 2/20 (4 overs)		Danielle Wyatt 62 (47); Amanda-Jade Wellington 3/27 (4 overs)

Melbourne Renegades won by 6 wickets (with 0 balls remaining)
CitiPower Centre, St Kilda
Umpires: Daryl Brigham and Mattis van Eck
Player of the match: Danielle Wyatt (Melbourne Renegades)

- Adelaide Strikers won the toss and elected to bat

Match 8
8 December 2018
14:50
Scorecard

Perth Scorchers; 8/103 (20 overs)	v	Brisbane Heat; 3/104 (12.5 overs)
Elyse Villani 45 (55); Sammy-Jo Johnson 2/9 (4 overs)		Jess Jonassen 28* (17); Kate Cross 2/26 (2.5 overs)

Brisbane Heat won by 7 wickets (with 43 balls remaining)
North Sydney Oval No. 1
Umpires: Andrew Hamilton and Ben Treloar
Player of the match: Sammy-Jo Johnson (Brisbane Heat)

- Brisbane Heat won the toss and elected to field
- Broadcast by Seven Network and Fox Cricket

Match 9
8 December 2018
19:10 (D/N)
Scorecard

Sydney Sixers; 4/168 (20 overs)	v	Sydney Thunder; 7/132 (20 overs)
Ellyse Perry 75* (66); Stafanie Taylor 2/16 (3 overs)		Harmanpreet Kaur 45 (28); Ellyse Perry 2/11 (3 overs)

Sydney Sixers won by 36 runs
North Sydney Oval No. 1
Umpires: Marc Nickl and Donovan Koch
Player of the match: Ellyse Perry (Sydney Sixers)

- Sydney Sixers won the toss and elected to bat
- Broadcast by Seven Network and Fox Cricket

Match 10
9 December 2018
10:30
Scorecard

Hobart Hurricanes; 6/196 (20 overs)	v	Melbourne Stars; 124 (16.5 overs)
Smriti Mandhana 69 (41); Alana King 2/22 (3 overs)		Angela Reakes 31 (24); Heather Knight 3/10 (3 overs)

Hobart Hurricanes won by 72 runs
West Park, Burnie
Umpires: Darren Close and Jeremiah Matibiri
Player of the match: Smriti Mandhana (Hobart Hurricanes)

- Hobart Hurricanes won the toss and elected to bat

Match 11
9 December 2018
14:10
Scorecard

Melbourne Renegades; 4/83 (14.3 overs)	v	Adelaide Strikers; 2/27 (4.3 overs)
Sophie Molineux 44* (37); Megan Schutt 2/9 (2 overs)		Sophie Devine 13 (9); Lea Tahuhu 1/1 (0.3 overs)

No result
Eastern Oval, Ballarat
Umpires: Dale Ireland and Greg Azzopardi

- Adelaide Strikers won the toss and elected to field
- Melbourne Renegades' innings reduced to 14.3 overs due to rain delay
- Adelaide Strikers' target revised to 78 runs from 11 overs
- Match abandoned due to further rain delays

Match 12
9 December 2018
14:50
Scorecard

Sydney Thunder; 4/192 (20 overs)	v	Brisbane Heat; 164 (18.5 overs)
Harmanpreet Kaur 56 (26); Sammy-Jo Johnson 2/30 (4 overs)		Grace Harris 54 (28); Maisy Gibson 3/18 (3 overs)

Sydney Thunder won by 28 runs
North Sydney Oval No. 1
Umpires: David Shepard and Marc Nickl
Player of the match: Harmanpreet Kaur (Sydney Thunder)

- Sydney Thunder won the toss and elected to bat
- Broadcast by Seven Network and Fox Cricket

=== Week 3 ===
Match 13
15 December 2018
10:00
Scorecard

Melbourne Stars; 9/124 (20 overs)	v	Perth Scorchers; 2/125 (19 overs)
Georgia Elwiss 26 (24); Emma King 2/12 (3 overs)		Elyse Villani 52* (49); Erin Osborne 1/19 (4 overs)

Perth Scorchers won by 8 wickets (with 6 balls remaining)
Casey Fields, Melbourne
Umpires: Dale Ireland and Mattis van Eck
Player of the match: Heather Graham (Perth Scorchers)

- Perth Scorchers won the toss and elected to field

Match 14
15 December 2018
14:20
Scorecard

Adelaide Strikers; 132 (20 overs)	v	Sydney Thunder; 4/134 (17.3 overs)
Suzie Bates 79* (60); Rene Farrell 3/12 (4 overs)		Rachel Priest 58* (46); Samantha Betts 1/18 (2 overs)

Sydney Thunder won by 6 wickets (with 15 balls remaining)
Blundstone Arena, Hobart
Umpires: Darren Close and Michael Graham-Smith
Player of the match: Suzie Bates (Adelaide Strikers)

- Sydney Thunder won the toss and elected to field
- Broadcast by Seven Network and Fox Cricket

Match 15
15 December 2018
19:00 (D/N)
Scorecard

Hobart Hurricanes; 5/133 (15 overs)	v	Sydney Sixers; 3/155 (14.4 overs)
Heather Knight 51* (35); Marizanne Kapp 2/20 (3 overs)		Ashleigh Gardner 79* (50); Veronica Pyke 1/14 (1.4 overs)

Sydney Sixers won by 7 wickets (with 2 balls remaining) (D/L method)
Blundstone Arena, Hobart
Umpires: Jeremiah Matibiri and G Beechey
Player of the match: Ashleigh Gardner (Sydney Sixers)

- Sydney Sixers won the toss and elected to field
- Match reduced to 15 overs per team due to rain delay
- Sydney Sixers' target revised to 152

Match 16
16 December 2018
10:00
Scorecard

Perth Scorchers; 7/90 (20 overs)	v	Melbourne Stars; 6/91 (15.3 overs)
Nicole Bolton 36 (44); Kristen Beams 3/13 (3 overs)		Katie Mack 33 (31); Hayley Jensen 2/16 (3 overs)

Melbourne Stars won by 4 wickets (with 27 balls remaining)
Casey Fields, Melbourne
Umpires: Dale Ireland and Mattis van Eck
Player of the match: Katie Mack (Melbourne Stars)

- Melbourne Stars won the toss and elected to field

Match 17
16 December 2018
10:10
Scorecard

Adelaide Strikers; 5/145 (20 overs)	v	Sydney Thunder; 5/146 (18.2 overs)
Bridget Patterson 36* (40); Stafanie Taylor 2/33 (4 overs)		Stafanie Taylor 55 (42); Danielle Hazell 1/20 (3 overs)

Sydney Thunder won by 5 wickets (with 10 balls remaining)
Blundstone Arena, Hobart
Umpires: Wade Stewart and Harvey Wolff
Player of the match: Stafanie Taylor (Sydney Thunder)

- Sydney Thunder won the toss and elected to field

Match 18
16 December 2018
13:50
Scorecard

Sydney Sixers; 3/158 (20 overs)	v	Hobart Hurricanes; 141 (19.1 overs)
Ellyse Perry 72* (55); Rhiann O'Donnell 1/27 (4 overs)		Georgia Redmayne 47* (36); Marizanne Kapp 4/27 (4 overs)

Sydney Sixers won by 17 runs
Blundstone Arena, Hobart
Umpires: Muhammad Qureshi and Ben Treloar
Player of the match: Ellyse Perry (Sydney Sixers)

- Hobart Hurricanes won the toss and elected to field
- Broadcast by Seven Network and Fox Cricket

Match 19
16 December 2018
14:10
Scorecard

Brisbane Heat; 8/174 (20 overs)	v	Melbourne Renegades; 7/153 (20 overs)
Sammy-Jo Johnson 31 (10); Molly Strano 4/21 (4 overs)		Amy Satterthwaite 38 (33); Sune Luus 2/16 (2 overs)

Brisbane Heat won by 21 runs
Geelong Cricket Ground, Geelong
Umpires: Greg Azzopardi and Daryl Brigham
Player of the match: Molly Strano (Melbourne Renegades)

- Brisbane Heat won the toss and elected to bat

Match 20
18 December 2018
12:00
Scorecard

Hobart Hurricanes; 7/173 (20 overs)	v	Perth Scorchers; 6/173 (20 overs)
Smriti Mandhana 38 (23); Nicole Bolton 3/20 (4 overs)		Heather Graham 44* (30); Brooke Hepburn 2/22 (4 overs)

Match tied (Perth Scorchers won the one over eliminator)
Blundstone Arena, Hobart
Umpires: Muhammad Qureshi and Jeremiah Matibiri
Player of the match: Heather Graham (Perth Scorchers)

- Hobart Hurricanes won the toss and elected to bat

Match 21
19 December 2018
13:45
Scorecard

Melbourne Stars; 7/132 (20 overs)	v	Brisbane Heat; 0/138 (10.5 overs)
Angela Reakes 30 (30); Jess Jonassen 3/17 (4 overs)		Grace Harris 101* (42); Georgia Elwiss 0/8 (1 over)

Brisbane Heat won by 10 wickets (with 55 balls remaining)
The Gabba, Brisbane
Umpires: Steven Farrell and Stephen Dionysius
Player of the match: Grace Harris (Brisbane Heat)

- Melbourne Stars won the toss and elected to bat

Match 22
21 December 2018
13:50
Scorecard

Hobart Hurricanes; 9/153 (20 overs)	v	Sydney Thunder; 4/156 (17.2 overs)
Erin Fazackerley 35 (21); Stafanie Taylor 3/24 (4 overs)		Naomi Stalenberg 55 (39); Heather Knight 2/25 (3 overs)

Sydney Thunder won by 6 wickets (with 16 balls remaining)
Manuka Oval, Canberra
Umpires: Darren Close and Andrew Crozier
Player of the match: Stafanie Taylor (Sydney Thunder)

- Sydney Thunder won the toss and elected to field
- Broadcast by Seven Network and Fox Cricket

Match 23
21 December 2018
16:00
Scorecard

Adelaide Strikers; 7/144 (20 overs)	v	Melbourne Stars; 6/145 (19.3 overs)
Sophie Devine 46 (36); Erin Osborne 2/16 (4 overs)		Erin Osborne 54* (45); Danielle Hazell 2/27 (2.3 overs)

Melbourne Stars won by 4 wickets (with 3 balls remaining)
Karen Rolton Oval, Adelaide
Umpires: Harry Singh and Eloise Sheridan
Player of the match: Erin Osborne (Melbourne Stars)

- Melbourne Stars won the toss and elected to field

=== Week 4 ===
Match 24
22 December
11:10
Scorecard

Sydney Sixers; 3/166 (20 overs)	v	Brisbane Heat; 7/155 (20 overs)
Ellyse Perry 103* (64); Delissa Kimmince 1/25 (4 overs)		Jess Jonassen 33 (27); Erin Burns 2/9 (2 overs)

Sydney Sixers won by 11 runs
Sydney Cricket Ground, Sydney
Umpires: Andrew Hamilton and Berend du Plessis
Player of the match: Ellyse Perry (Sydney Sixers)

- Sydney Sixers won the toss and elected to bat

Match 25
22 December
16:30
Scorecard

Perth Scorchers; 6/122 (20 overs)	v	Melbourne Renegades; 6/123 (17.1 overs)
Heather Graham 42 (41); Lea Tahuhu 2/12 (2 overs)		Jess Cameron 35 (31); Nicole Bolton 3/28 (4 overs)

Melbourne Renegades won by 4 wickets (with 17 balls remaining)
WACA Ground, Perth
Umpires: J Paterson and James Hewitt
Player of the match: Heather Graham (Perth Scorchers)

- Melbourne Renegades won the toss and elected to field

Match 26
23 December
13:20
Scorecard

Adelaide Strikers; 3/172 (20 overs)	v	Melbourne Stars; 9/153 (20 overs)
Sophie Devine 95 (60); Annabel Sutherland 1/17 (3 overs)		Mignon du Preez 33 (27); Sophie Devine 5/41 (4 overs)

Adelaide Strikers won by 19 runs
Adelaide Oval, Adelaide
Umpires: Claire Polosak and Eloise Sheridan
Player of the match: Sophie Devine (Adelaide Strikers)

- Melbourne Stars won the toss and elected to field
- Broadcast by Seven Network and Fox Cricket

Match 27
23 December
14:10
Scorecard

Brisbane Heat; 7/154 (20 overs)	v	Sydney Sixers; 88 (18 overs)
Sammy-Jo Johnson 51 (30); Erin Burns 3/20 (4 overs)		Dane van Niekerk 25 (33); Sammy-Jo Johnson 3/23 (4 overs)

Brisbane Heat won by 66 runs
Hurstville Oval, Sydney
Umpires: Roberto Howard and Berend du Plessis
Player of the match: Sammy-Jo Johnson (Brisbane Heat)

- Brisbane Heat won the toss and elected to bat

Match 28
23 December
14:00
Scorecard

Perth Scorchers; 2/172 (20 overs)	v	Melbourne Renegades; 6/157 (20 overs)
Meg Lanning 75 (50); Molly Strano 1/29 (3 overs)		Danielle Wyatt 42 (34); Heather Graham 2/32 (4 overs)

Perth Scorchers won by 15 runs
WACA Ground, Perth
Umpires: Dean Trigg and Ashlee Gibbons
Player of the match: Meg Lanning (Perth Scorchers)

- Melbourne Renegades won the toss and elected to field

Match 29
24 December
14:15
Scorecard

Hobart Hurricanes; 135 (19.4 overs)	v	Sydney Thunder; 4/136 (16.4 overs)
Smriti Mandhana 35 (22); Rene Farrell 2/20 (3.4 overs)		Rachael Haynes 68* (48); Brooke Hepburn 1/13 (3 overs)

Sydney Thunder won by 6 wickets (with 20 balls remaining)
Spotless Stadium, Sydney
Umpires: Ryan Nelson and Andrew Hamilton
Player of the match: Rachael Haynes (Sydney Thunder)

- Sydney Thunder won the toss and elected to field

Match 30
26 December
22:45
Scorecard

Perth Scorchers; 5/136 (20 overs)	v	Brisbane Heat; 5/139 (19.2 overs)
Meg Lanning 70 (56); Haidee Birkett 3/19 (4 overs)		Beth Mooney 35 (28); Nicole Bolton 2/12 (4 overs)

Brisbane Heat won by 5 wickets (with 4 balls remaining)
Optus Stadium, Perth
Attendance:14,983
Umpires: Nathan Johnstone and Trent Steenholdt
Player of the match: Haidee Birkett (Brisbane Heat)

- Brisbane Heat won the toss and elected to field
- Broadcast by Seven Network and Fox Cricket
- Played as a double-header after a men's BBL match

Match 31
27 December
14:50
Scorecard

Melbourne Renegades; 8/110 (20 overs)	v	Sydney Sixers; 3/111 (14.1 overs)
Maitlan Brown 33 (30); Lauren Cheatle 2/6 (2 overs)		Alyssa Healy 70* (42); Molly Strano 3/26 (4 overs)

Sydney Sixers won by 7 wickets (with 35 balls remaining)
Sydney Cricket Ground, Sydney
Umpires: Berend du Plessis and Ryan Nelson
Player of the match: Alyssa Healy (Sydney Sixers)

- Melbourne Renegades won the toss and elected to bat

Match 32
28 December
14:10
Scorecard

Sydney Sixers; 1/206 (20 overs)	v	Adelaide Strikers; 132 (19.1 overs)
Alyssa Healy 112* (69); Tahlia McGrath 0/19 (2 overs)		Suzie Bates 46 (36); Lauren Cheatle 3/22 (4 overs)

Sydney Sixers won by 74 runs
Hurstville Oval, Sydney
Umpires: T Penman and Ryan Nelson
Player of the match: Alyssa Healy (Sydney Sixers)

- Adelaide Strikers won the toss and elected to field

=== Week 5 ===
Match 33
29 December
10:00
Scorecard

Sydney Thunder; 5/179 (20 overs)	v	Perth Scorchers; 4/180 (19.5 overs)
Rachael Haynes 50 (40); Piepa Cleary 2/28 (4 overs)		Meg Lanning 76 (40); Nicola Carey 2/35 (4 overs)

Perth Scorchers won by 6 wickets (with 1 ball remaining)
Lilac Hill Park, Perth
Umpires: Ashlee Gibbons and James Hewitt
Player of the match: Meg Lanning (Perth Scorchers)

- Perth Scorchers won the toss and elected to field
- Perth Scorchers set a new record for the highest successful run chase in a WBBL match

Match 34
29 December
14:50
Scorecard

Melbourne Stars; 130 (19.5 overs)	v	Melbourne Renegades; 9/131 (19.5 overs)
Lizelle Lee 36 (26); Amy Satterthwaite 3/16 (3 overs)		Amy Satterthwaite 37 (33); Holly Ferling 2/14 (3 overs)

Melbourne Renegades won by 1 wicket (with 1 ball remaining)
Marvel Stadium, Melbourne
Umpires: Daryl Brigham and Mattis van Eck
Player of the match: Amy Satterthwaite (Melbourne Renegades)

- Melbourne Renegades won the toss and elected to field

Match 35
30 December
10:00
Scorecard

Perth Scorchers; 7/127 (20 overs)	v	Sydney Thunder; 5/124 (20 overs)
Nicole Bolton 50 (41); Lisa Griffith 2/17 (3 overs)		Alex Blackwell 37 (30); Heather Graham 2/8 (3 overs)

Perth Scorchers won by 3 runs
Lilac Hill Park, Perth
Umpires: Trent Steenholdt and J Paterson
Player of the match: Nicole Bolton (Perth Scorchers)

- Sydney Thunder won the toss and elected to field

Match 36
30 December
13:50
Scorecard

Brisbane Heat; 129 (19 overs)	v	Hobart Hurricanes; 5/133 (18.2 overs)
Grace Harris 23 (12); Meg Phillips 3/16 (4 overs)		Corinne Hall 48 (39); Grace Harris 3/23 (4 overs)

Hobart Hurricanes won by 5 wickets (with 10 balls remaining)
UTAS Stadium, Launceston
Umpires: Darren Close and Jeremiah Matibiri
Player of the match: Corinne Hall (Hobart Hurricanes)

- Hobart Hurricanes won the toss and elected to field
- Broadcast by Seven Network and Fox Cricket

Match 37
31 December
12:30
Scorecard

Brisbane Heat; 8/138 (20 overs)	v	Hobart Hurricanes; 80 (16.3 overs)
Josephine Dooley 44* (30); Meg Phillips 3/22 (4 overs)		Mikayla Hinkley 16 (25); Jess Jonassen 2/11 (3 overs)

Brisbane Heat won by 58 runs
UTAS Stadium, Launceston
Umpires: Muhammad Qureshi and Darren Close
Player of the match: Grace Harris (Brisbane Heat)

- Hobart Hurricanes won the toss and elected to field

Match 38
31 December
13:20
Scorecard

Sydney Sixers; 4/147 (20 overs)	v	Adelaide Strikers; 8/139 (20 overs)
Ashleigh Gardner 49 (38); Amanda-Jade Wellington 2/19 (4 overs)		Suzie Bates 60 (58); Dane van Niekerk 2/12 (4 overs)

Sydney Sixers won by 8 runs
Adelaide Oval, Adelaide
Umpires: Claire Polosak and Eloise Sheridan
Player of the match: Dane van Niekerk (Sydney Sixers)

- Sydney Sixers won the toss and elected to bat
- Broadcast by Seven Network and Fox Cricket

Match 39
1 January
14:50
Scorecard

Melbourne Renegades; 5/149 (20 overs)	v	Melbourne Stars; 7/101 (20 overs)
Sophie Molineux 78* (54); Holly Ferling 2/30 (4 overs)		Georgia Elwiss 22 (25); Molly Strano 3/25 (4 overs)

Melbourne Renegades won by 48 runs
Melbourne Cricket Ground, Melbourne
Attendance:11,136
Umpires: Greg Azzopardi and Daryl Brigham
Player of the match: Sophie Molineux (Melbourne Renegades)

- Melbourne Stars won the toss and elected to field
- Played as a double-header before a men's BBL match

Match 40
2 January
14:50
Scorecard

Sydney Sixers; 7/98 (20 overs)	v	Sydney Thunder; 2/101 (17.4 overs)
Marizanne Kapp 40 (41); Rachel Trenaman 2/11 (4 overs)		Naomi Stalenberg 44 (50); Marizanne Kapp 1/13 (4 overs)

Sydney Thunder won by 8 wickets (with 14 balls remaining)
Spotless Stadium, Sydney
Umpires: Ryan Nelson and Ben Treloar
Player of the match: Lisa Griffith (Sydney Thunder)

- Sydney Thunder won the toss and elected to field
- Broadcast by Seven Network and Fox Cricket

Match 41
3 January
14:50
Scorecard

Hobart Hurricanes; 8/115 (20 overs)	v	Melbourne Renegades; 5/119 (18.1 overs)
Corinne Hall 37 (30); Sophie Molineux 2/22 (4 overs)		Amy Satterthwaite 27 (35); Sasha Maloney 3/20 (4 overs)

Melbourne Renegades won by 5 wickets (with 11 balls remaining)
GMHBA Stadium, Geelong
Umpires: Dale Ireland and David Shepard
Player of the match: Sophie Molineux (Melbourne Renegades)

- Hobart Hurricanes won the toss and elected to bat
- Broadcast by Seven Network and Fox Cricket

=== Week 6 ===
Match 42
5 January
14:00
Scorecard

Sydney Thunder; 3/92 (9.2 overs)	v	Melbourne Stars
Harmanpreet Kaur 21* (16); Holly Ferling 2/25 (3 overs)

No result
Blacktown International Sportspark, Sydney
Umpires: T Penman and Marc Nickl

- Sydney Thunder won the toss and elected to bat
- Match abandoned due to rain

Match 43
5 January
18:15
Scorecard

Brisbane Heat; 7/160 (20 overs)	v	Adelaide Strikers; 7/117 (20 overs)
Josephine Dooley 48* (33); Sophie Devine 2/15 (2 overs)		Sophie Devine 39 (37); Delissa Kimmince 3/21 (3 overs)

Brisbane Heat won by 43 runs
Harrup Park, Mackay
Attendance: 5,650
Umpires: Steven Farrell and David Taylor
Player of the match: Josephine Dooley (Brisbane Heat)

- Adelaide Strikers won the toss and elected to field
- The crowd of 5,650 set a new record for highest attendance at a standalone WBBL match

Match 44
6 January
10:00
Scorecard

Sydney Sixers; 2/183 (20 overs)	v	Perth Scorchers; 151 (19.4 overs)
Ellyse Perry 80* (54); Piepa Cleary 1/27 (3 overs)		Meg Lanning 76 (51); Lauren Cheatle 2/19 (4 overs)

Sydney Sixers won by 32 runs
Lilac Hill Park, Perth
Umpires: Dean Trigg and Trent Steenholdt
Player of the match: Ellyse Perry (Sydney Sixers)

- Sydney Sixers won the toss and elected to bat

Match 45
6 January
14:00
Scorecard

Sydney Thunder; 6/122 (20 overs)	v	Melbourne Stars; 9/117 (20 overs)
Nicola Carey 39* (32); Annabel Sutherland 2/17 (4 overs)		Angela Reakes 33 (38); Maisy Gibson 3/22 (4 overs)

Sydney Thunder won by 5 runs
Bankstown Oval, Sydney
Umpires: T Penman and Roberto Howard
Player of the match: Nicola Carey (Sydney Thunder)

- Melbourne Stars won the toss and elected to field

Match 46
6 January
15:00
Scorecard

Melbourne Renegades; 3/143 (20 overs)	v	Brisbane Heat; 118 (18.5 overs)
Sophie Molineux 50 (52); Sune Luus 1/24 (3 overs)		Beth Mooney 44 (31); Lea Tahuhu 3/13 (4 overs)

Melbourne Renegades won by 25 runs
Harrup Park, Mackay
Attendance: 2,563
Umpires: Steven Farrell and David Taylor
Player of the match: Sophie Molineux (Melbourne Renegades)

- Melbourne Renegades won the toss and elected to bat

Match 47
8 January
13:50
Scorecard

Melbourne Renegades; 4/139 (20 overs)	v	Sydney Thunder; 4/141 (19.1 overs)
Danni Wyatt 59 (53); Nicola Carey 2/25 (3 overs)		Alex Blackwell 66* (48); Lea Tahuhu 1/23 (4 overs)

Sydney Thunder won by 6 wickets (with 5 balls remaining)
Spotless Stadium, Sydney
Umpires: T Penman and Donovan Koch
Player of the match: Alex Blackwell (Sydney Thunder)

- Sydney Thunder won the toss and elected to field
- Broadcast by Seven Network and Fox Cricket

Match 48
8 January
13:40
Scorecard

Adelaide Strikers; 5/189 (20 overs)	v	Hobart Hurricanes; 8/189 (20 overs)
Sophie Devine 99* (53); Brooke Hepburn 2/28 (4 overs)		Georgia Redmayne 54* (37); Sarah Coyte 3/32 (4 overs)

Match tied (Adelaide Strikers won the one over eliminator)
Karen Rolton Oval, Adelaide
Umpires: Harry Singh and Craig Thomas
Player of the match: Sophie Devine (Adelaide Strikers)

- Hobart Hurricanes won the toss and elected to field

Match 49
9 January
13:40
Scorecard

Adelaide Strikers; 5/165 (20 overs)	v	Hobart Hurricanes; 9/141 (20 overs)
Tahlia McGrath 65 (39); Heather Knight 2/31 (4 overs)		Heather Knight 55 (39); Megan Schutt 3/21 (4 overs)

Adelaide Strikers won by 24 runs
Karen Rolton Oval, Adelaide
Umpires: Craig Thomas and Eloise Sheridan
Player of the match: Tahlia McGrath (Adelaide Strikers)

- Adelaide Strikers won the toss and elected to bat

Match 50
10 January
12:50
Scorecard

Melbourne Stars; 88 (19.5 overs)	v	Brisbane Heat; 3/91 (8.4 overs)
Mignon du Preez 27 (35); Delissa Kimmince 4/18 (3.5 overs)		Jess Jonassen 34* (14); Annabel Sutherland 1/23 (3 overs)

Brisbane Heat won by 7 wickets (with 68 balls remaining)
The Gabba, Brisbane
Umpires: David Taylor and Claire Polosak
Player of the match: Sammy-Jo Johnson (Brisbane Heat)

- Brisbane Heat won the toss and elected to field
- Broadcast by Seven Network and Fox Cricket

=== Week 7 ===
Match 51
12 January
10:50
Scorecard

Adelaide Strikers; 7/138 (20 overs)	v	Perth Scorchers; 108 (18.3 overs)
Sophie Devine 59 (48); Heather Graham 2/25 (4 overs)		Lauren Ebsary 38 (30); Danielle Hazell 3/20 (4 overs)

Adelaide Strikers won by 30 runs
Albrecht Oval, Alice Springs
Umpires: Harry Singh and Craig Thomas
Player of the match: Sophie Devine (Adelaide Strikers)

- Adelaide Strikers won the toss and elected to bat
- Venue changed to Albrecht Oval due to an unsafe outfield at Traeger Park

Match 52
12 January
13:00
Scorecard

Melbourne Renegades; 6/146 (20 overs)	v	Hobart Hurricanes; 6/143 (20 overs)
Amy Satterthwaite 66 (57); Alex Hartley 3/21 (4 overs)		Erin Fazackerley 52 (41); Lea Tahuhu 1/18 (4 overs)

Melbourne Renegades won by 3 runs
CitiPower Centre, Melbourne
Umpires: Dale Ireland and Greg Azzopardi
Player of the match: Amy Satterthwaite (Melbourne Renegades)

- Hobart Hurricanes won the toss and elected to field

Match 53
12 January
18:15
Scorecard

Sydney Thunder; 7/171 (20 overs)	v	Brisbane Heat; 7/172 (19.3 overs)
Rachael Haynes 57 (51); Delissa Kimmince 2/23 (4 overs)		Beth Mooney 102 (55); Harmanpreet Kaur 2/23 (3 overs)

Brisbane Heat won by 3 wickets (with 3 balls remaining)
Cazaly's Stadium, Cairns
Attendance: 4,673
Umpires: Donovan Koch and Stephen Dionysius
Player of the match: Beth Mooney (Brisbane Heat)

- Brisbane Heat won the toss and elected to field

Match 54
13 January
10:50
Scorecard

Adelaide Strikers; 6/140 (20 overs)	v	Perth Scorchers; 0/144 (16.4 overs)
Suzie Bates 39 (35); Emma King 2/19 (4 overs)		Meg Lanning 70* (48); Sophie Devine 0/18 (3 overs)

Perth Scorchers won by 10 wickets (with 20 balls remaining)
Albrecht Oval, Alice Springs
Umpires: Harry Singh and Craig Thomas
Player of the match: Amy Jones (Perth Scorchers)

- Adelaide Strikers won the toss and elected to bat
- Venue changed to Albrecht Oval due to an unsafe outfield at Traeger Park
- Former Australian player Lauren Ebsary made her last WBBL appearance

Match 55
13 January
14:50
Scorecard

Sydney Sixers; 2/136 (20 overs)	v	Melbourne Renegades; 8/107 (20 overs)
Ellyse Perry 67* (62); Georgia Wareham 1/26 (3 overs)		Jess Duffin 39 (39); Marizanne Kapp 2/19 (4 overs)

Sydney Sixers won by 29 runs
GMHBA Stadium, Geelong
Umpires: Daryl Brigham and Mattis van Eck
Player of the match: Erin Burns (Sydney Sixers)

- Sydney Sixers won the toss and elected to bat

Match 56
14 January
14:50
Scorecard

Sydney Sixers; 92 (19 overs)	v	Melbourne Stars; 5/96 (16.4 overs)
Alyssa Healy 35 (21); Kristen Beams 3/11 (3 overs)		Erin Osborne 34* (29); Marizanne Kapp 2/9 (4 overs)

Melbourne Stars won by 5 wickets (with 20 balls remaining)
Melbourne Cricket Ground, Melbourne
Umpires: Daryl Brigham and Donovan Koch
Player of the match: Alana King (Melbourne Stars)

- Sydney Sixers won the toss and elected to bat
- Broadcast by Seven Network and Fox Cricket

== Knockout phase ==
Semifinals
2	Sydney Thunder	7/136
3	Brisbane Heat	7/140
1	Sydney Sixers	4/131
4	Melbourne Renegades	6/131

Finals
3	Brisbane Heat	7/132
1	Sydney Sixers	7/131

=== Semi-finals ===
Semi-final 1
19 January
10:40
Scorecard

Brisbane Heat; 7/140 (20 overs)	v	Sydney Thunder; 7/136 (20 overs)
Sammy-Jo Johnson 33 (25); Stafanie Taylor 1/13 (2 overs)		Rachel Priest 44 (33); Jemma Barsby 3/23 (2 overs)

Brisbane Heat won by 4 runs
Drummoyne Oval, Sydney
Umpires: David Shepard and Darren Close
Player of the match: Sammy-Jo Johnson (Brisbane Heat)

- Sydney Thunder won the toss and elected to field
- Broadcast by Seven Network and Fox Cricket

Semi-final 2
19 January
13:50
Scorecard

Sydney Sixers; 4/131 (20 overs)	v	Melbourne Renegades; 6/131 (20 overs)
Ellyse Perry 54* (59); Lea Tahuhu 1/18 (4 overs)		Sophie Molineux 55 (54); Erin Burns 2/13 (3 overs)

Match tied (Sydney Sixers won the one over eliminator)
Drummoyne Oval, Sydney
Umpires: Claire Polosak and Donovan Koch
Player of the match: Ellyse Perry (Sydney Sixers)

- Sydney Sixers won the toss and elected to bat
- Broadcast by Seven Network and Fox Cricket
- Ellyse Perry became the first player to score 700 runs in a WBBL season

=== Final ===
26 January
10:10
Scorecard

Sydney Sixers; 7/131 (20 overs)	v	Brisbane Heat; 7/132 (19.2 overs)
Ellyse Perry 33 (37); Grace Harris 3/23 (4 overs)		Beth Mooney 65 (46); Erin Burns 2/25 (4 overs)

Brisbane Heat won by 3 wickets (with 4 balls remaining)
Drummoyne Oval, Sydney
Attendance: 5,368
Umpires: David Shepard and Donovan Koch
Player of the match: Beth Mooney (Brisbane Heat)

- Sydney Sixers won the toss and elected to bat
- Broadcast by Seven Network and Fox Cricket
- Brisbane Heat won their first title

== Statistics ==
=== Highest totals ===
Team	Score	Against	Venue	Date
Sydney Sixers	1/206 (20 overs)	Adelaide Strikers	Hurstville Oval	28 December 2018
Hobart Hurricanes	6/196 (20 overs)	Melbourne Stars	West Park Oval	9 December 2018
Sydney Thunder	4/192 (20 overs)	Brisbane Heat	North Sydney Oval	9 December 2018
Adelaide Strikers	5/189 (20 overs)	Hobart Hurricanes	Karen Rolton Oval	8 January 2019
Hobart Hurricanes	8/189 (20 overs)	Adelaide Strikers	Karen Rolton Oval	8 January 2019

- Source: CricInfo

=== Most runs ===
Player	Team	Runs
Ellyse Perry	Sydney Sixers	778
Sophie Devine	Adelaide Strikers	556
Beth Mooney	Brisbane Heat	486
Alyssa Healy	Sydney Sixers	445
Suzie Bates	Adelaide Strikers	421

- Source: CricInfo

=== Most wickets ===
Player	Team	Wickets
Heather Graham	Perth Scorchers	22
Delissa Kimmince	Brisbane Heat	22
Marizanne Kapp	Sydney Sixers	20
Sammy-Jo Johnson	Brisbane Heat	20
Stafanie Taylor	Sydney Thunder	19

- Source: CricInfo

== Awards ==
=== Player of the tournament ===
Player of the Tournament votes are awarded on a 3-2-1 basis by the two standing umpires at the conclusion of every match, meaning a player can receive a maximum of six votes per game.

Pos.	Player	Team	Votes
1st	Ellyse Perry	Sydney Sixers	38
2nd	Sophie Devine	Adelaide Strikers	30
3rd	Grace Harris	Brisbane Heat	25
=4th	Meg Lanning	Perth Scorchers	23
=4th	Sophie Molineux	Melbourne Renegades	23
=4th	Sammy-Jo Johnson	Brisbane Heat	23
5th	Elyse Villani	Perth Scorchers	22

Source: WBBL|04 Player of the Tournament

=== Team of the tournament ===
A twelve-player honorary squad recognising the standout performers of WBBL|04 was named by cricket.com.au:

- Ellyse Perry (Sydney Sixers) – captain
- Sophie Devine (Adelaide Strikers)
- Alyssa Healy (Sydney Sixers) – wicket-keeper
- Meg Lanning (Perth Scorchers)
- Grace Harris (Brisbane Heat)
- Stafanie Taylor (Sydney Thunder)
- Sammy-Jo Johnson (Brisbane Heat)
- Heather Graham (Perth Scorchers)
- Delissa Kimmince (Brisbane Heat)
- Marizanne Kapp (Sydney Sixers)
- Molly Strano (Melbourne Renegades)
- Sophie Molineux (Melbourne Renegades) – 12th player

=== Young gun award ===
Players under 21 years of age at the start of the season are eligible for the Young Gun Award. Weekly winners are selected over the course of the season by a panel of Cricket Australia officials based on match performance, on-field and off-field attitude, and their demonstration of skill, tenacity and good sportsmanship. Each weekly winner receives a $500 Rebel gift card and the overall winner receives a $5000 cash prize, as well as access to a learning and mentor program.

Melbourne Renegades leg-spinner Georgia Wareham was named the Young Gun of WBBL|04 after claiming 11 wickets and finishing the regular season with the best economy rate in the league.

== Attendance ==
A total of 135,861 fans attended WBBL|04—an average of 2,384 per match (excluding the two games abandoned due to rain). This included some double-headers with men's BBL matches, such as the crowd of 14,983 reported for the match between Perth and Brisbane on Boxing Day played at Optus Stadium, and the crowd of 11,136 reported for the New Year's Day match at the Melbourne Cricket Ground between the Stars and Renegades.

A new record for the highest attendance at a standalone WBBL match was set on 5 January when the Brisbane Heat played the Adelaide Strikers at Harrup Park in front of 5,650 spectators. A total of 8,735 people attended the knockout stage of the tournament across two weekends at Drummoyne Oval, with all ticket proceeds donated to Dolly’s Dream. The final was announced as a sellout and attracted a crowd of 5,368.

== Audience ==
A total of twenty-three matches were televised on Seven Network and Fox Cricket The remaining 36 matches were live streamed on the Cricket Australia website as well as the Cricket Australia Live App for mobile.

Below are the television ratings for every game that was broadcast by Seven Network and Fox Cricket during the season. The semi-final super over between the Sixers and Renegades was watched by a combined average audience of 423,000 (196,000 metro; 133,000 regional; 94,000 subscription). The final was the most-watched WBBL game ever with a combined average audience of 479,000 and peaking at 812,000.

Cricket Australia reported over 3.8 million highlight views on their YouTube channel and almost 10 million minutes viewed on the Cricket Network's live stream, with a 38 per cent rise of minutes viewed in Australia compared to the previous season.

Match No	Teams	Average TV Ratings				
Match No	Teams	Seven Network				Fox Cricket
Match No	Teams	National		5 metro cities		Subscription
Match No	Teams	Session 1	Session 2	Session 1	Session 2	Session 1 & 2
1	Perth Scorchers v Hobart Hurricanes					41,000
2	Sydney Sixers v Melbourne Stars			96,000		51,000
3	Adelaide Strikers v Brisbane Heat					50,000
4	Melbourne Renegades v Sydney Thunder					59,000
5	Sydney Sixers v Perth Scorchers				129,000	84,000
8	Brisbane Heat v Perth Scorchers					
9	Sydney Sixers v Sydney Thunder				140,000	34,000 & 81,000
12	Sydney Thunder v Brisbane Heat					
14	Adelaide Strikers v Sydney Thunder					
18	Sydney Sixers v Hobart Hurricanes					
22	Sydney Thunder v Hobart Hurricanes					42,000
26	Adelaide Strikers v Melbourne Stars				191,000	86,000
30	Perth Scorchers v Brisbane Heat					
36	Hobart Hurricanes v Brisbane Heat	262,000	242,000	236,000	210,000	
38	Adelaide Strikers v Sydney Sixers					35,000
40	Sydney Thunder v Sydney Sixers					42,000
41	Melbourne Renegades v Hobart Hurricanes					
47	Sydney Thunder v Melbourne Renegades					
50	Brisbane Heat v Melbourne Stars					
56	Melbourne Stars v Sydney Sixers					
Semi-final 1	Sydney Thunder v Brisbane Heat	166,000	188,000	98,000	120,000	33,000
Semi-final 2	Sydney Sixers v Melbourne Renegades	221,000	266,000	136,000	156,000	76,000
Final	Sydney Sixers v Brisbane Heat	390,000		214,000	319,000	89,000

== See also ==
- 2018–19 Big Bash League season
