= Elly Donald =

Australian cricketer

Personal information
- Full name: Elly Elizabeth Donald
- Born: 17 September 1997 (age 29); Rosebud, Victoria, Australia
- Batting: Right-handed
- Bowling: Right-arm medium
- Role: All-rounder

Domestic team information
- Years: Team
- 2018/19–2020/21: Victoria
- 2018/19: Melbourne Stars

Career statistics
Competition	WLA
Matches	6
Runs scored	5
Batting average	69
100s/50s	0/0
Top score	29*
Balls bowled	36
Wickets	0
Bowling average	–
5 wickets in innings	0
10 wickets in match	0
Best bowling	–
Catches/stumpings	0/–
- Source: CricketArchive, 1 April 2021

Elly Elizabeth Donald (born 17 September 1997) is an Australian cricketer who played for Victoria in the Women's National Cricket League (WNCL). An all-rounder, she bats right-handed and bowls right-arm medium pace. She made her WNCL debut on 9 November 2018, scoring 26 runs in a 48-run loss to the ACT Meteors. She was part of the Melbourne Stars squad for the 2018–19 Women's Big Bash League season but did not make an appearance.

Donald currently studies a Bachelor of Exercise and Sport Science at Deakin University.
