= Hayleigh Brennan =

Australian cricketer (born 1999)

Personal information
- Full name: Hayleigh Maree Brennan
- Born: 5 March 1999 (age 27); Dandenong, Victoria, Australia
- Batting: Right-handed
- Bowling: Right-arm medium
- Role: Bowler

Domestic team information
- Years: Team
- 2016/17–2017/18: Victoria
- 2017/18: Melbourne Stars
- 2018: Middlesex
- 2018/19: Perth Scorchers

Career statistics
Competition	WLA	WT20
Matches	14	19
Runs scored	33	34
Batting average	5.50	8.50
100s/50s	0/0	0/0
Top score	11	11*
Balls bowled	552	306
Wickets	8	12
Bowling average	44.25	28.00
5 wickets in innings	0	0
10 wickets in match	0	0
Best bowling	2/14	4/14
Catches/stumpings	5/–	4/–
- Source: CricketArchive, 29 June 2021

Hayleigh Maree Brennan (born 5 March 1999) is an Australian cricketer. Born in Dandenong, a suburb of Melbourne, Victoria, she is a right-arm medium bowler. She has represented Victoria (2016/17–2017/18) and Middlesex (2018) in List A cricket. In the Women's Big Bash League (WBBL), she played for the Melbourne Stars during the 2017–18 season and the Perth Scorchers during the 2018–19 season.

Brennan played for Australia A against England Academy Women in April 2016.
