= Naomi Stalenberg =

Australian cricketer

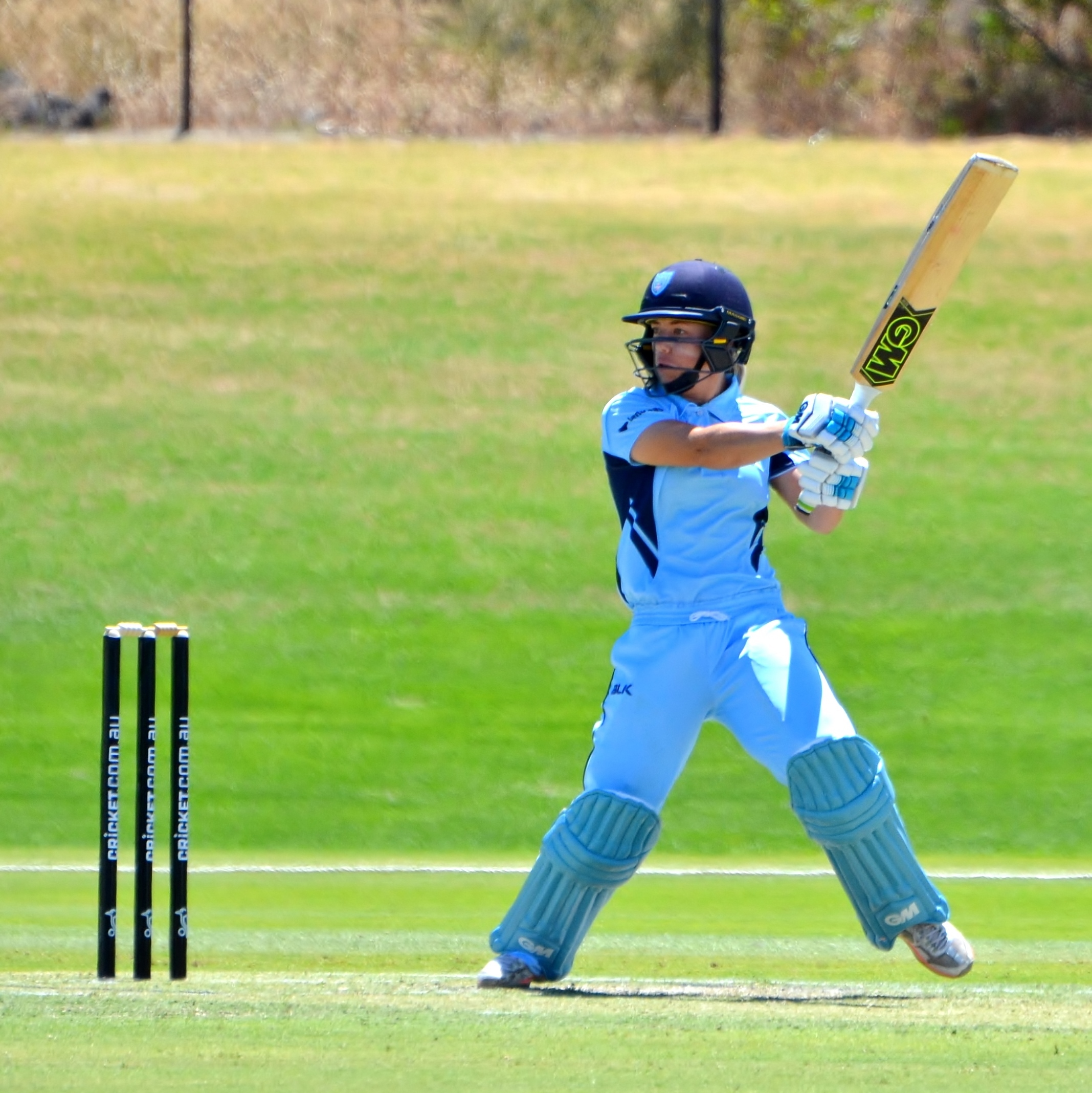
- Stalenberg batting for New South Wales in 2017

Personal information
- Full name: Naomi Elizabeth Stalenberg
- Born: 18 April 1994 (age 32); Blacktown, New South Wales, Australia
- Batting: Right-handed
- Bowling: Right-arm medium
- Role: All-rounder

International information
- National side: Australia
- Only T20I (cap 42): 26 January 2016 v India

Domestic team information
- Years: Team
- 2012/13: Northern Districts
- 2013/14–2019/20: New South Wales
- 2015/16–2019/20: Sydney Thunder
- 2020/21–2023/24: Hobart Hurricanes
- 2020/21–present: Tasmania
- 2024/25: Melbourne Renegades

Career statistics
Competition	T20I	LA	T20
Matches	1	118	161
Runs scored	–	2,362	1,841
Batting average	–	27.46	16.73
100s/50s	–	0/14	0/2
Top score	–	86	55
Balls bowled	–	445	90
Wickets	–	11	5
Bowling average	–	35.09	16.00
5 wickets in innings	–	0	0
10 wickets in match	–	0	0
Best bowling	–	4/15	2/16
Catches/stumpings	1/–	32/–	48/–
- Source: CricketArchive, 7 August 2025

Naomi Elizabeth Stalenberg (born 18 April 1994) is an Australian cricketer who plays as a right-handed batter and right-arm medium bowler. She represented New South Wales in domestic cricket beginning in 2013, and in 2016 she played a Twenty20 International (T20I) for the Australian national cricket team. In 2020 she was cut from New South Wales' squad and began playing for Tasmania. She has also played in the Women's Big Bash League (WBBL) for the Sydney Thunder and the Hobart Hurricanes.

== Early life ==
Stalenberg was born in Blacktown in Greater Western Sydney on 18 April 1994. Her grandparents had immigrated to Australia from the Netherlands. Stalenberg began playing sport at an early stage of her life. She started playing football at six years old and cricket at eight years old. She initially focused more on football and participated in the New South Wales state All Schools Championship.

After high school, Stalenberg took a gap year and stayed in Utrecht in the Netherlands. Despite not speaking Dutch, she played for a local cricket team in the city and decided to pursue a career in cricket.

== Cricket career ==
In the 2013/14 season, Stalenberg began playing domestic cricket in Australia, playing for New South Wales in the Women's National Cricket League (WNCL). She also joined the Sydney Thunder for the inaugural season of the Women's Big Bash League (WBBL) in 2015. Because of the low pay in women's cricket early in her career, Stalenberg split her time between studying at university, working at a hotel, training at nights and playing cricket on weekends.

Stalenberg had a strong year in the 2015–16 WBBL season. She was one of the competition's fastest-scoring batters, scoring 160 runs at a strike rate of 150.94 runs per 100 balls. As a result, she was selected as part of the Australian national cricket team's 15-player squad for a Twenty20 International (T20I) series against India in January 2016. Stalenberg appeared in one T20I against India on 26 January 2016, but Australia finished their run chase before she had a chance to bat, so she neither batted nor bowled in the match.

In the 2016/17 season, Stalenberg was able to become a full-time cricketer as New South Wales began paying all of their players a full time wage. She had another strong year in 2017/18, but she was overlooked by the national team and instead played warm-up matches against the touring English team for a Cricket Australia XI. Playing for New South Wales, she won the Women's National Cricket League final for the fourth time, and at the end of the season she was called up again to the national team for the 2017–18 India women's Tri-Nation Series, but she did not play a match during the tournament.

Stalenberg had her career-best season in the WNCL in 2019/20, scoring 255 runs in nine games for New South Wales, but at the end of the season she was cut from the team. During the 2020 winter she switched state teams and signed with Tasmania. She began playing for Tasmania in the WNCL and the Hobart Hurricanes in the WBBL in the 2020/21 season.
