= Angela Reakes =

Australian cricketer

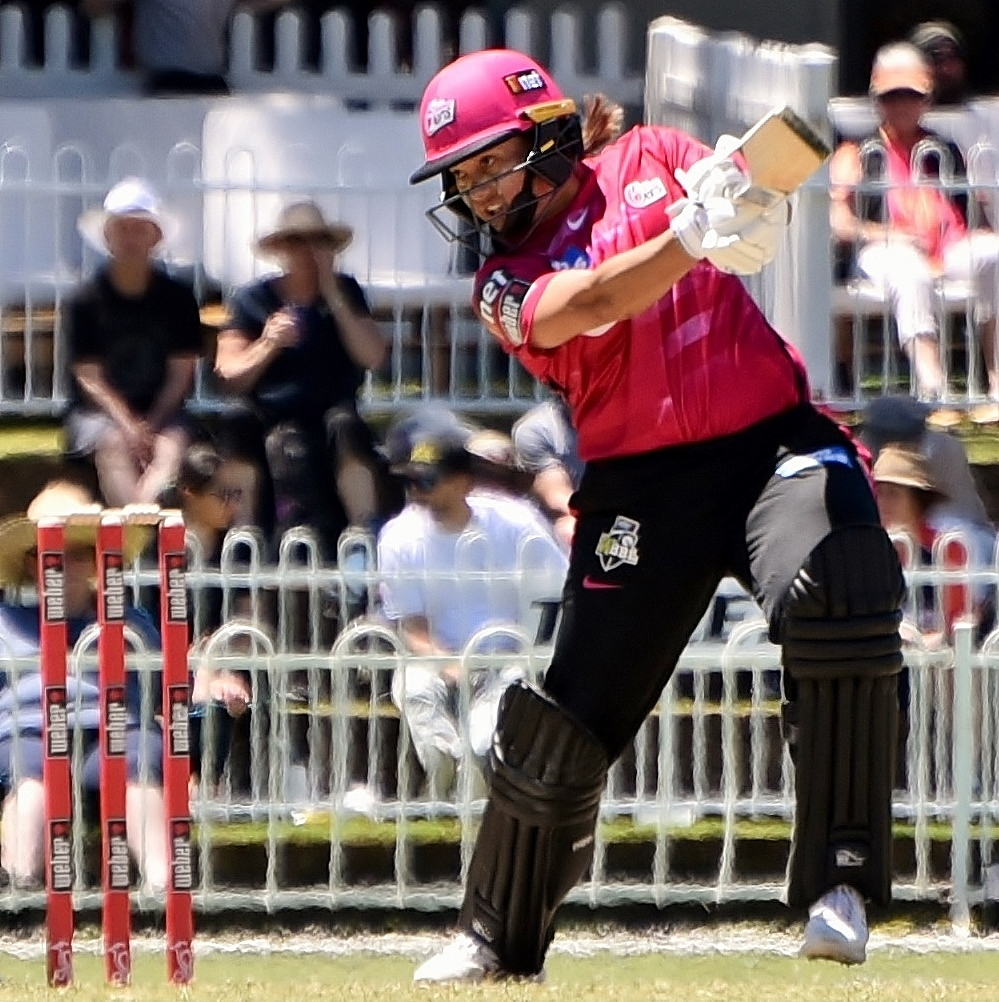
- Reakes batting for Sydney Sixers during WBBL|07

Personal information
- Full name: Angela Rose Reakes
- Born: 27 December 1990 (age 35); Byron Bay, New South Wales, Australia
- Batting: Right-handed
- Bowling: Right-arm leg break
- Role: All-rounder

Domestic team information
- Years: Team
- 2009/10–2014/15: New South Wales
- 2015/16–2022/23: Australian Capital Territory
- 2015/16–2017/18: Sydney Sixers
- 2018/19–2019/20: Melbourne Stars
- 2020/21–2022/23: Sydney Sixers

Career statistics
| Competition | WLA | WT20 |
|---|---|---|
| Matches | 88 | 156 |
| Runs scored | 967 | 650 |
| Batting average | 24.17 | 13.00 |
| 100s/50s | 0/5 | 0/0 |
| Top score | 76 | 33 |
| Balls bowled | 2,138 | 1,074 |
| Wickets | 63 | 51 |
| Bowling average | 27.36 | 22.56 |
| 5 wickets in innings | 0 | 0 |
| 10 wickets in match | 0 | 0 |
| Best bowling | 4/10 | 4/19 |
| Catches/stumpings | 34/– | 45/– |
- Source: CricketArchive, 27 February 2023

Angela Rose Reakes (born 27 December 1990) is an Australian former cricketer who played as a right-handed batter and right-arm leg break bowler. She played for New South Wales, ACT Meteors, Sydney Sixers and Melbourne Stars.

== Early life ==
Reakes was born on 27 December 1990 in Byron Bay, New South Wales. She learned her cricket in a net built by her father on their property in Knockrow, located near Byron Bay.

== Cricket career ==
Reakes made her debut in state cricket for the New South Wales Breakers in a WNCL match against Queensland Fire on 7 November 2009. She scored 1* and did not bowl. She continued to play for the Breakers until she moved to the ACT Meteors in 2015, citing the chance to improve her batting. After signing for the Meteors, she pleaded guilty to betting $9 on the 2015 men's Cricket World Cup final, however, she avoided suspension and was free to continue playing. She was named captain of the ACT Meteors for the 2020–21 WNCL season.

In the WBBL, Reakes first played for the Sydney Sixers, helping the team to the title in both 2016–17 and 2017–18. Reakes signed for the Melbourne Stars ahead of the 2018–19 season and played 14 matches. Just one week before the start of the 2019–20 season, she was sidelined for its duration by a snapped achilles tendon. In September 2020, Reakes re-signed for the Sixers.

In February 2023, Reakes announced her retirement from cricket.
