= Erin Osborne =

Australian cricketer (born 1989)

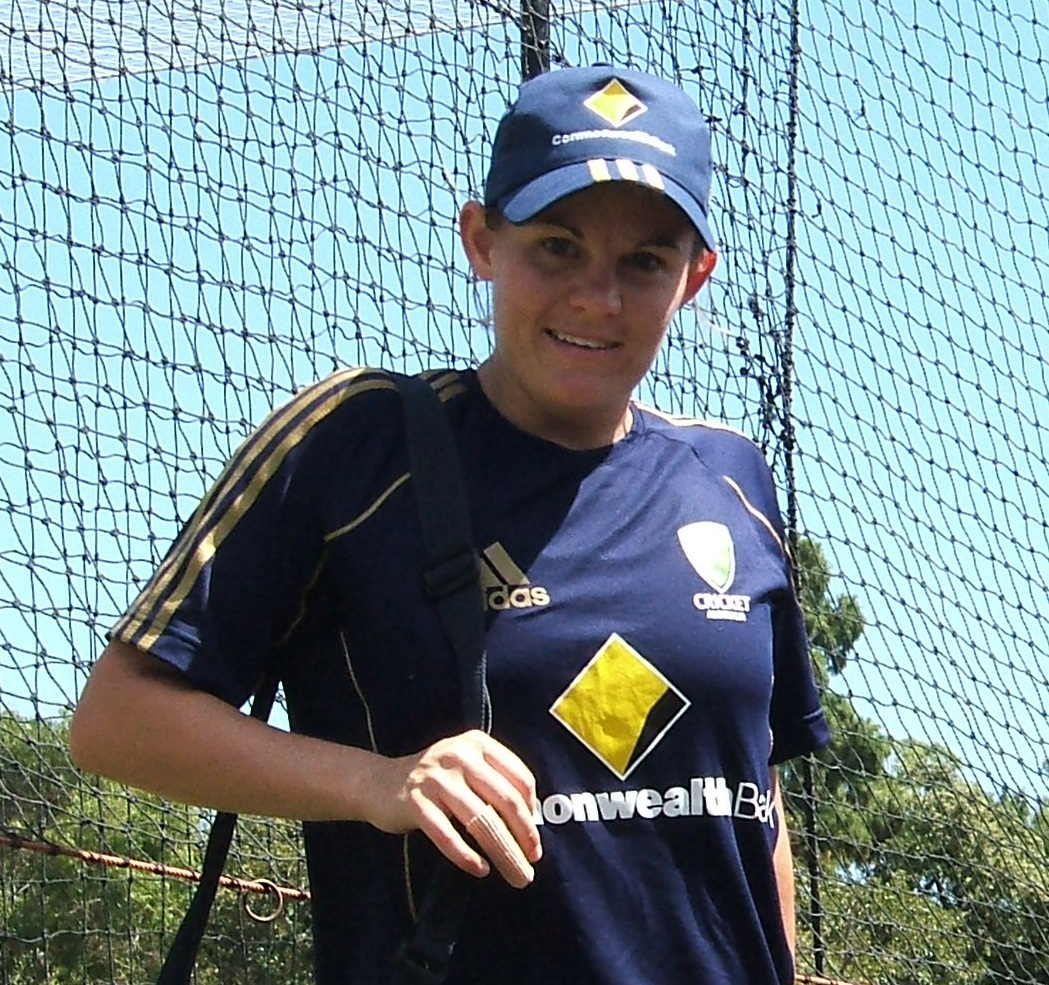

Personal information
- Full name: Erin Alyce Osborne
- Born: 27 June 1989 (age 37); Taree, New South Wales, Australia
- Nickname: Os or Oz
- Batting: Right-handed
- Bowling: Right-arm off break
- Role: All-rounder

International information
- National side: Australia (2009–2016)
- Test debut (cap 165): 11 August 2013 v England
- Last Test: 10 January 2014 v England
- ODI debut (cap 114): 1 February 2009 v New Zealand
- Last ODI: 25 September 2016 v Sri Lanka
- ODI shirt no.: 25
- T20I debut (cap 25): 15 February 2009 v New Zealand
- Last T20I: 27 September 2016 v Sri Lanka

Domestic team information
- Years: Team
- 2008/09–2014/15: New South Wales
- 2015: Sussex
- 2015/16–2021/22: Australian Capital Territory
- 2015/16–2016/17: Sydney Thunder
- 2017/18–2021/22: Melbourne Stars

Career statistics
Competition	WTest	WODI	WT20I
Matches	2	60	59
Runs scored	78	359	78
Batting average	39.00	22.43	8.66
100s/50s	0/0	0/0	0/0
Top score	40	47*	17*
Balls bowled	425	2,594	1,124
Wickets	5	68	48
Bowling average	27.40	25.57	22.50
5 wickets in innings	0	0	0
10 wickets in match	0	0	0
Best bowling	4/67	3/9	4/19
Catches/stumpings	2/–	18/–	25/–
- Source: Cricinfo CricketArchive, 27 March 2021

Erin Alyce Osborne (born 27 June 1989) is an Australian former cricketer and current cricket coach and commentator, who appeared in 2 Test matches, 60 One Day Internationals and 59 Twenty20 Internationals for Australia between 2009 and 2016. An all-rounder, she played as a right-arm off break bowler and right-handed batter. She coached the ACT's female Meteors Development Squad, and was Cricket ACT’s Male Pathway Manager, the first woman to hold the role. She is now currently the head coach of Somerset Women.

She made her international debut in early 2009 after topping the wicket-taking aggregates in her debut season for New South Wales in the WNCL. However, she found it difficult to maintain a regular position in the Australian team because of the presence of Shelley Nitschke and Lisa Sthalekar, two spin bowling all-rounders who were ranked in the top ten in the world for both bowling and all-round performance.

After scoring an unbeaten century for New South Wales at Under-19 level in 2007, Osborne made her WNCL during the 2008–09 season. After taking two wickets for 13 runs (2/13) from ten overs on debut, she took three wickets in each of the next two matches. She later took 4/18 against Victoria and ended with 15 wickets at 14.20 as New South Wales took out the WNCL. Osborne was rewarded with selection for the Rose Bowl series against New Zealand, and took 3/32 in her third match, ending the series with five wickets. She was retained for the 2009 World Cup held in Australia, playing in six of the hosts' seven matches. She took nine wickets at 19.77.

Osborne was selected for the 2009 World Twenty20 in England but did not play in any of the matches. Australia stayed for a bilateral series against the hosts, and Osborne was dropped after going wicketless in the first two ODIs and being required to bowl less than half of her overs; she was also overlooked for the one-off Test. During the 2009–10 WNCL, Osborne took 15 wickets at 14.17, including a haul of 3/33 in the final against Victoria, helping to secure a 59-run win and a fifth consecutive WNCL title for New South Wales. She was named the player of the match for her contributions. In the T20 competition, she took eight wickets in seven matches. In a series for the Australian Under-21s against New Zealand Emerging Players, Osborne was dismissed once in scoring 129 runs and took six wickets at 15.50.

Osborne was selected for the Rose Bowl series at the end of the season but had limited opportunities because of the presence of Sthalekar and Nitschke. She played in six of the eight ODIs and bowled less than half of the possible number of overs, taking five wickets at 32.20. She played in only one of the five T20 internationals, taking 1/13 from two overs.

== Youth career ==
In January 2007, aged 17 and a half, she played for New South Wales in the Under-19 interstate competition. In the match against Western Australia, she hammered an unbeaten 106 as New South Wales amassed 3/305 before dismissing their opponents for 35. She ended the tournament with 145 runs at 72.50 and took three wickets at 7.33.

== Domestic debut ==
In October 2008, Osborne played her first match for the senior New South Wales team in a match against India. She took 1/24 from eight overs, took two wickets and scored 21 in a 48-run loss. A month later, she made her debut in the Women's National Cricket League (WNCL) in a double-header against Queensland. She took 2/13 from ten overs in the first match, helping to restrict Queensland to 9/108 before New South Wales completed an eight-wicket win.

The next day, Osborne batted for the first time and was unbeaten on 11 when New South Wales were out for 185. The runs she added at the end turned out to be crucial as New South Wales won by nine runs. Osborne took 3/28 from her ten overs. The following week, she took 3/20 in the first match against Western Australia. She was wicketless in the second match of the weekend, but New South Wales won both matches regardless, by seven and eight wickets respectively.

The WNCL was then adjourned and she then played six matches for the Second XI in the space of a week. New South Wales won all the fixtures except for one that was abandoned due to inclement weather. She scored 34 runs at 11.33 with a best of 30 against Tasmania, and took seven wickets at 3.28 and an economy rate of 2.00. This included a return of 3/11 from four overs against Western Australia and 3/8 from 5.3 overs against Victoria.

When the senior competition resumed, Osborne took one wicket in each of the two matches against South Australia before New South Wales faced Victoria in the last pair of round-robin matches. In the first, she took her career best figures of 4/18 with four maidens in her ten overs as Victoria were bowled out for 142. The hosts then proceeded to a nine-wicket victory.

The next day, Osborne took 0/27 from her ten overs in Victoria's 7/227. New South Wales chased down the target with three wickets in hand, with Osborne unbeaten on five. The following week, the two teams met again in the final of the competition and Osborne took 1/23 from eight overs. She was not required to bat as New South Wales passed the target of 118 with six wickets in hand. Osborne ended the WNCL season with 16 runs without being dismissed and took 15 wickets at 14.20 at an economy rate of 2.47 from eight matches.

Osborne also played in two Twenty20 matches for her state during the season, taking 0/17 from her four overs in both matches. She scored three not out and a duck in these matches. New South Wales defeated South Australia before losing to Victoria.

== International debut ==
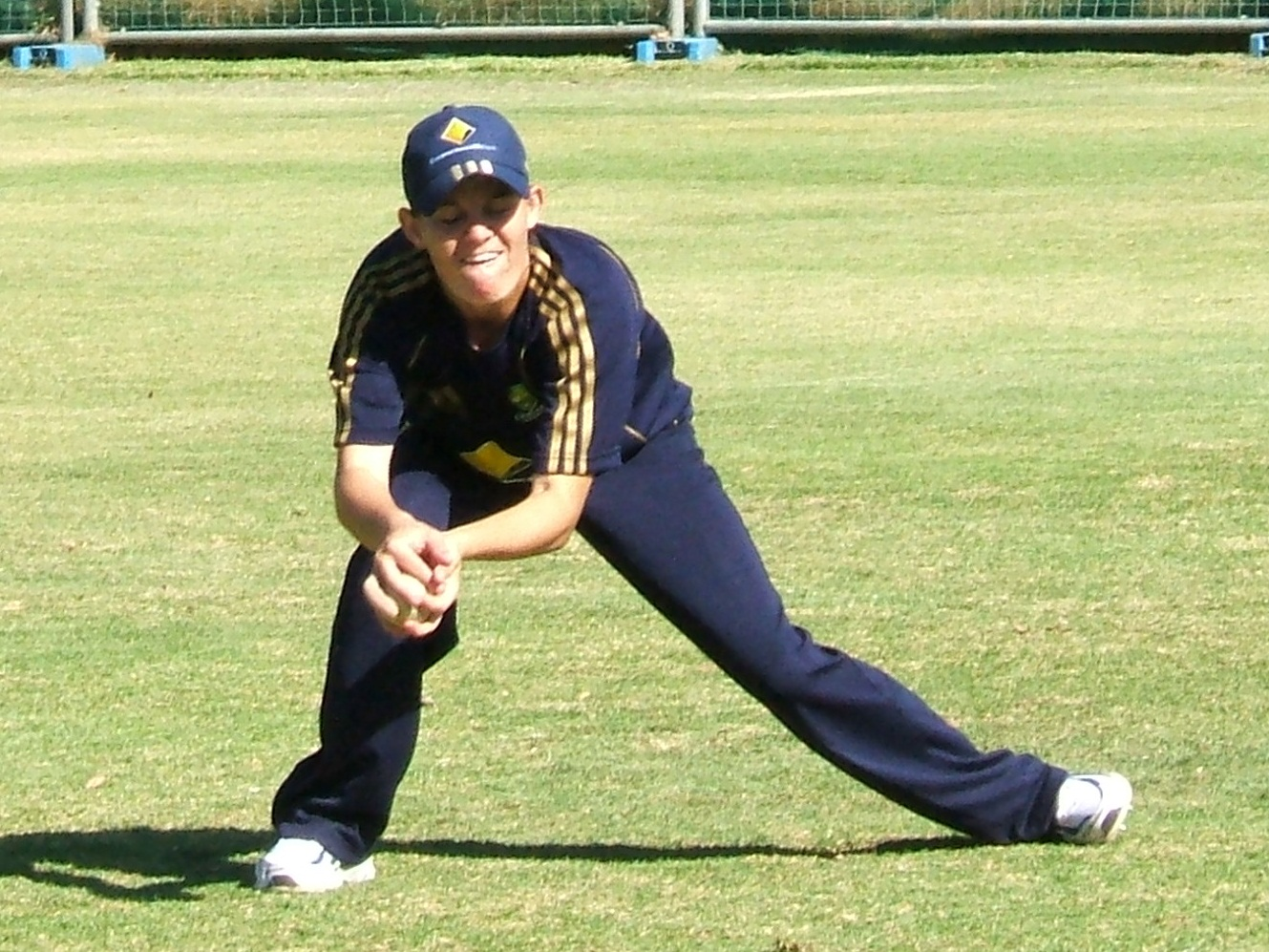
Osborne taking a catch at training

Osborne was rewarded with her first international call-up ahead of the 2009 Women's Cricket World Cup after leading the wicket-taking in the WNCL. She made her debut on the Rose Bowl series in February 2009 played away against New Zealand. Osborne played in the first four ODIs, making her debut at Cobham Oval in Whangārei. Batting in the lower-order, she made four not out as Australia made 8/150. She then took 1/19 from her ten overs, with three maidens, as the hosts narrowly won by two wickets. In the next match she took 0/33 and ended on three not out in a four run loss when her partners were dismissed.

The series then moved to Seddon Park in Hamilton where she took 3/32 in a 104-run victory. Osborne took another wicket in the fourth match to help level the series; the final match was abandoned due to rain and she ended her debut series with five wickets at 26.00 at an economy rate of 3.33.

The teams then went to Australia for the World Cup, and played a T20 international at the Sydney Cricket Ground before the tournament, where Osborne made her debut for Australia in the shortest format. She took 0/13 from three overs and completed a catch and was not required to bat as the hosts won a rain-shortened match.

== 2009 World Cup and World Twenty20 ==
In two warm-up matches ahead of the World Cup, Osborne made took 2/31 from nine overs and 1/0 from 2.3 overs against England and Sri Lanka respectively. She was included in the team for the opening match against New Zealand at North Sydney Oval, taking 2/37 from her ten overs as Australia conceded 205. She did not bat as they fell short of the target. She then claimed 1/35 from ten overs in Australia's must-win match against South Africa as the hosts avoided elimination with a 61-run victory. She then batted in the World Cup for the first time, in last group match, before taking 2/22 from ten overs as Australia defeated West Indies to reach the next round.

Osborne was left out of Australia's first match of the next phase against India, which they lost by 16 runs. She was recalled and took 1/22 against Pakistan and 1/41 against England, bowling ten overs in both games. Osborne was not required to bat as the Australians won both matches but it was not enough to place them in the top two nations and qualify for the final. They faced India in the third place playoff and Osborne fell for six. The hosts were all out for 142 and India reached the target with three wickets in hand despite Osborne's economical return of 2/21 from nine overs. Osborne ended the World Cup with nine wickets at 19.77 at an economy rate of 3.01; in all but one match, she was more economical than the Australian team as a whole. She also scored 10 runs at 10.00.

Osborne was selected for the 2009 World Twenty20 in England and Australia hosted New Zealand for three T20 matches in tropical Darwin during the southern hemisphere winter before the teams flew to the tournament. She took 1/21 from four overs in her only match, a 32-run Australian victory. Once the Australians were in England, Osborne took 1/14 from three overs against the hosts in the only pre-tournament practice match. Osborne did not play any of the three pool matches in the tournament or the semi-final where Australia were eliminated in the semi-final by England.

Australia stayed in England for a bilateral series against the hosts, who were the reigning world champions in both ODIs and T20s, after the end of the World Twenty20. Osborne was drought in and took 2/24 from four overs as Australia upset England in the only T20 by 34 runs after scoring 3/151. She was played in the first two ODIs held at Ford County Ground, Chelmsford, taking a total of 0/39 from eight overs and making 1 and 11 not out in comfortable English victories by nine wickets and 53 runs. She was left out of the remaining three matches; England won all the matches except the last, which was washed out. Osborne was left out of the team for the one-off Test.

== 2009–10 season ==
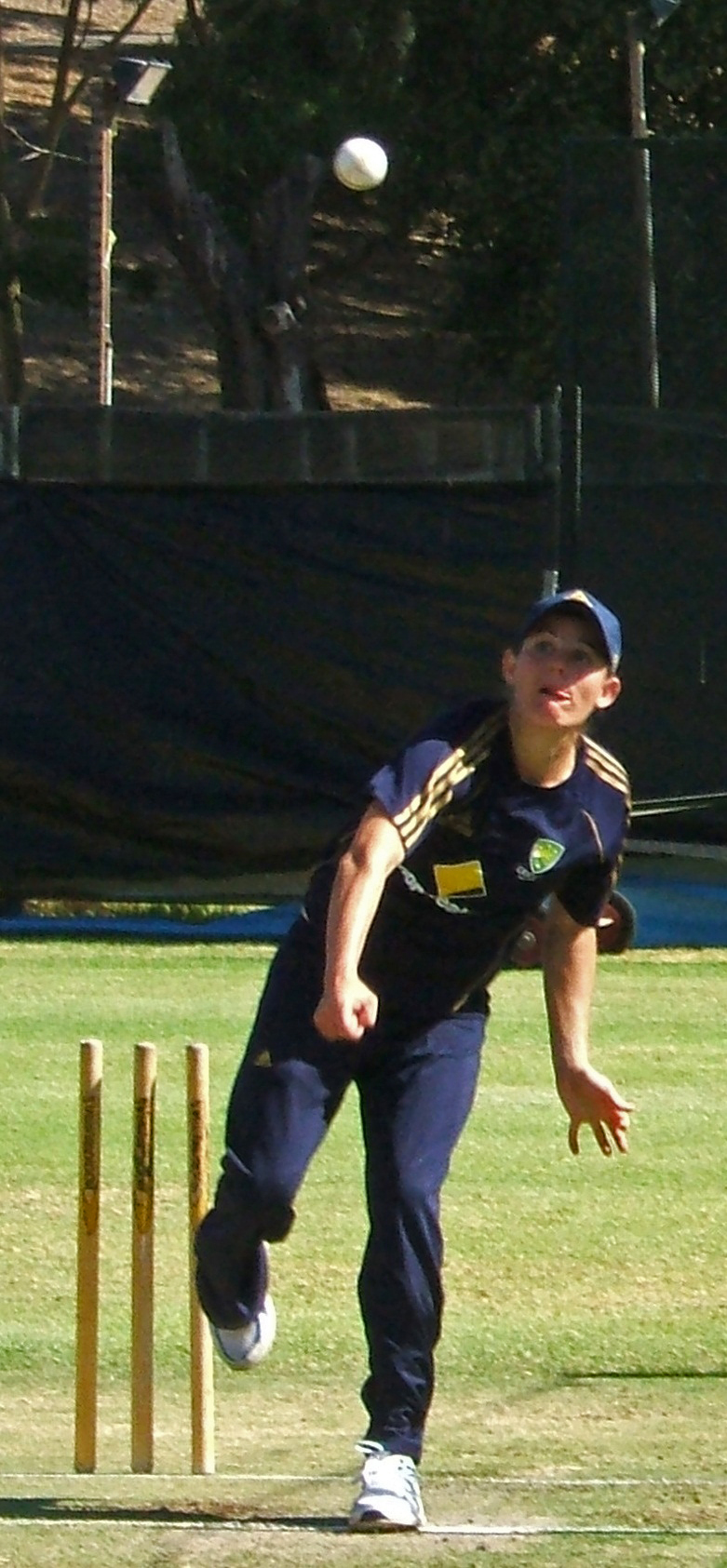
Osborne bowing in the nets

Osborne started the 2009–10 WNCL, took a wicket in each of the two matches against Queensland, and then took 2/34 from 10 overs in both matches against the Australian Capital Territory, although the last match ended in defeat. She then took 2/33 and 1/25 against Victoria as the matches were shared. Having taken 3/23 from ten overs to help bowl out Western Australia for 99 and set up a ten-wicket win, she then took 2/38 in a 76-run win over South Australia before New South Wales against met Victoria in the final. Osborne scored one as New South Wales reached 9/206. She then took 3/33 from nine overs to help dismiss Victoria for 147, sealing a fifth consecutive title and was named the player of the match for her contribution. She ended the season with 17 wickets at 14.17 at an economy rate of 2.77. She scored 41 runs at 6.83.

In the T20 competition, Osborne took eight wickets at 16.62 and an economy rate of 5.11 and scored 25 runs at 12.50 from seven matches. She ran into form in the lead-up to the final, taking 3/18 from three overs and 3/16 from four overs against Western Australia and south Australia respectively, helping to restrict both teams to sub-100 scores. In the final against Victoria, Osborne took 1/25 from overs. In pursuit of 128 for victory, she made 10 as New South Wales were bowled out for 75, sealing a 52-run win.

During an adjournment in the WNCL in November, Osborne played for New South Wales in the Second XI competition. In seven matches, all of which were won, she was used mostly as a batsman, often batting in the top-order and was largely rested from her bowling duties, delivering only nine overs in total. She scored 115 runs at 38.75 and took a total of 1/25.

In the middle of the season, she played for the Australian Under-21s against New Zealand Emerging Players in five matches, and allowed to bat higher up the order in the youth team, she made 129 runs at 129.00, scoring 48 not out and 60 in the last two games. She also took six wickets at 15.50 at an economy rate of 4.46 and took five catches. Her best performance in the field was her 3/25 and two catches in the fourth match, which in addition to her unbeaten 48 helped Australia to a series-sealing 122-run win. Australia won the series 4–1.

Osborne was selected in the Australian squad for the Rose Bowl series against New Zealand, but was not fully utilised in the first two matches at the Adelaide Oval, as captain Alex Blackwell elected to use Sthalekar and Nitschke more often and earlier. After scoring two not out and taking 1/8 from only three overs in the closing stages of a 115-run win in the first match, Osborne took 0/23 from five overs in a win the next day. Australia decided to omit the under-used specialist bowler in place of batsman Leah Poulton, and Osborne did not return until the fifth ODI at the Junction Oval, where she was attacked in taking 1/33 from six overs in a 103-run win; Australia swept the series 5–0. Osborne ended with two wickets at 32.00 at an economy rate of 4.57.

In the five T20s that followed, three at Bellerive Oval in Hobart, and two in New Zealand, Osborne only played in the fifth match, taking 1/13 from two overs and scoring one as Australia were bowled out in a 17-run defeat and lost 5–0.

She then played in all three ODIs in New Zealand as Australia whitewashed their hosts. In the first match in Queenstown, she was attacked by the local batsmen and ended with 0/39 from five overs. In the run-chase she made 13 not out at the death as Australia reached the target with two wickets in hand from the final ball. She took 2/29 and 1/19, both from ten overs, in the last two matches at Invercargill. The tourists won both by six wickets to sweep the ODIs. Osborne ended with three wickets at 32.33 at and economy rate of 3.88.

== 2010 World Twenty 20 ==
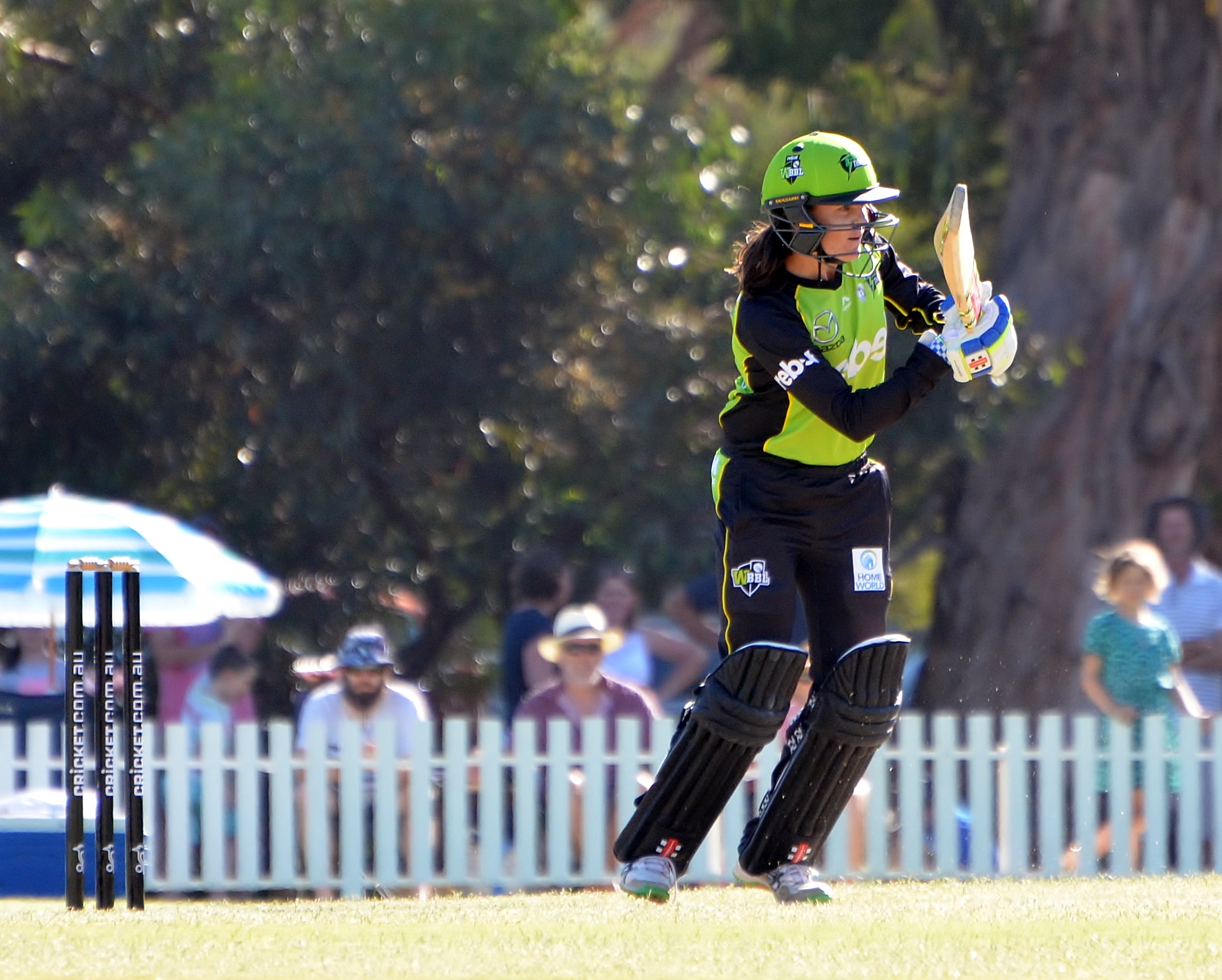
Osborne batting for Sydney Thunder during WBBL02

Osborne was part of the 2010 World Twenty20 winning team in the West Indies but played in only one of Australia's matches. She was omitted from both warm-up matches against New Zealand and Pakistan. Australia lost the first before winning the second.

Australia were grouped with defending champions England, South Africa and the West Indies. In the first match, Australia defeated England after the scores were tied, as well as the Super Over, because they had scored the only six of the match. In the following match, they defeated South Africa by 24 runs. Osborne played in neither matches, but she was called into the team for the West Indies match in place of Sarah Elliott. A leg spinning all rounder, Elliott failed to have an impact with either bat or ball, making only 4 from 15 balls, and 8 from 6 balls in the two matches, and had only bowled in the latter fixture, taking 0/22 from two overs. Osborne was brought in, giving Australia an extra frontline bowling option.

Osborne was not required to bat as Australia finished on 7/133, and was then expensive with the ball, taking 0/20 from two overs as Australia won by nine runs to finish the group stage unbeaten at the top of their quartet. She caught Pamela Lavine from the bowling of Perry. Australia went on to face India in the semi-final, and Elliott was brought back in place of Osborne. Elliott was required to neither bat nor bowl as the Indians ended with 3/119, which was chased down by the Australians with seven wickets and seven balls to spare, and was retained for the final, making 19 not out from 20 Australia won by three runs in a low-scoring match.
