= 2019–20 Melbourne Stars WBBL season =

Women's Twenty20 cricket team season

Melbourne Stars
2019–20 season
- Melbourne Stars 2019–20 cap logo
- Coach: David Hemp
- Captain(s): Elyse Villani
- Home ground: CitiPower Centre
- League: WBBL
- Record: 2–12 (8th)
- Finals: DNQ
- Leading Run Scorer: Lizelle Lee – 475
- Leading Wicket Taker: Erin Osborne – 11
- Player of the Season: Lizelle Lee

The 2019–20 Melbourne Stars Women's season was the fifth in the team's history. Coached by David Hemp and captained by Elyse Villani, they finished on the bottom of the WBBL|05 ladder. The Stars managed to win just two matches for the season, resulting in their first wooden spoon.

== Squad ==
Each 2019–20 squad featured 15 active players, with an allowance of up to five marquee signings including a maximum of three from overseas. Australian marquees are players who held a national women's team contract at the time of signing for their WBBL|05 team.

Notable details for the Stars squad included:

- Elyse Villani joined the team after spending four years with the Perth Scorchers
- Kristen Beams, ahead of her final season, relinquished the captaincy with Villani taking over the role
- Katie Mack did not return to the team for WBBL|05, instead she was recruited by the Adelaide Strikers
- Emma Inglis, having spent the past two seasons with the Melbourne Renegades, switched back to the Stars where she began her Big Bash career
- Madeline Penna and Chloe Rafferty were added to the squad as injury replacements for Alana King and Lucy Cripps

The table below lists the Stars players and their key stats (including runs scored, batting strike rate, wickets taken, economy rate, catches and stumpings) for the season.

No.	Name	Nat.	Birth date	Batting style	Bowling style	G	R	SR	W	E	C	S	Notes
Batters
00	Mignon du Preez	(South Africa)	13 June 1989	Right-handed	–	14	404	120.59	–	–	3	–	Overseas marquee
67	Lizelle Lee	(South Africa)	2 April 1992	Right-handed	Right-arm medium	14	475	131.94	–	–	3	–	Overseas marquee
8	Angela Reakes	(Australia)	27 December 1990	Right-handed	Right-arm leg spin	–	–	–	–	–	–	–	
2	Elyse Villani	(Australia)	6 October 1989	Right-handed	Right-arm medium	14	344	103.92	–	–	5	–	Captain, Australian marquee
All-rounders
24	Lucy Cripps	(Australia)	6 December 2001	Right-handed	Right-arm medium	2	–	–	–	–	–	–	
25	Tess Flintoff	(Australia)	31 March 2003	Right-handed	Right-arm medium	13	75	120.96	2	7.78	1	–	
76	Erin Osborne	(Australia)	27 June 1989	Right-handed	Right-arm off spin	14	205	110.21	11	7.54	2	–	
3	Annabel Sutherland	(Australia)	12 October 2001	Right-handed	Right-arm medium fast	10	104	92.85	5	7.67	2	–	
Wicket-keepers
4	Nicole Faltum	(Australia)	17 January 2000	Right-handed	–	9	54	112.50	–	–	1	1	
17	Emma Inglis	(Australia)	15 July 1988	Right-handed	–	2	24	75.00	–	–	0	0	
21	Katey Martin	(New Zealand)	7 February 1985	Right-handed	–	9	74	104.22	–	–	1	2	Overseas marquee
Bowlers
26	Kristen Beams	(Australia)	6 November 1984	Right-handed	Right-arm leg spin	9	8	133.33	2	7.56	1	–	
9	Holly Ferling	(Australia)	22 December 1995	Right-handed	Right-arm medium fast	10	4	80.00	5	7.06	2	–	
44	Nicola Hancock	(Australia)	8 November 1995	Right-handed	Right-arm medium fast	13	36	109.09	4	7.73	1	–	
13	Alana King	(Australia)	22 November 1995	Right-handed	Right-arm leg spin	7	17	51.51	2	9.17	1	–	
11	Madeline Penna	(Australia)	30 August 2000	Right-handed	Right-arm leg spin	10	3	30.00	10	8.23	–	–	Injury replacement
7	Chloe Rafferty	(Australia)	16 June 1999	Right-handed	Right-arm medium fast	4	6	100.00	1	11.16	1	–	Injury replacement

== Ladder ==
Pos	Team	Pld	W	L	NR	Pts	NRR
1	Brisbane Heat (C)	14	10	4	0	20	0.723
2	Adelaide Strikers (RU)	14	10	4	0	20	0.601
3	Perth Scorchers	14	9	5	0	18	0.026
4	Melbourne Renegades	14	8	6	0	16	0.117
5	Sydney Sixers	14	7	7	0	14	−0.076
6	Sydney Thunder	14	5	8	1	11	−0.487
7	Hobart Hurricanes	14	4	9	1	9	−0.197
8	Melbourne Stars	14	2	12	0	4	−0.734

- The four top ranked teams qualified for the play-off phase.

== Fixtures ==
All times are local time

Match 2
19 October 2019
14:00
Scorecard

Hobart Hurricanes; 5/164 (20 overs)	v	Melbourne Stars; 9/144 (20 overs)
Chloe Tryon 46* (18); Erin Osborne 2/44 (4 overs)		Erin Osborne 40 (37); Maisy Gibson 3/26 (4 overs)

Hobart Hurricanes won by 20 runs
CitiPower Centre, Melbourne
Umpires: Greg Azzopardi and Daryl Brigham
Player of the match: Belinda Vakarewa (Hobart Hurricanes)

- Melbourne Stars won the toss and elected to field
- Broadcast by Cricket Network

Match 5
20 October 2019
14:10
Scorecard

Melbourne Stars; 7/136 (20 overs)	v	Hobart Hurricanes; 5/137 (18.3 overs)
Lizelle Lee 25 (21); Belinda Vakarewa 2/22 (4 overs)		Nicola Carey 60* (46); Kristen Beams 2/23 (3 overs)

Hobart Hurricanes won by 5 wickets (with 9 balls remaining)
CitiPower Centre, Melbourne
Attendance: 488
Umpires: Dale Ireland and Mattis van Eck
Player of the match: Nicola Carey (Hobart Hurricanes)

- Hobart Hurricanes won the toss and elected to field
- Broadcast by Cricket Network

Match 11
26 October 2019
14:00
Scorecard

Melbourne Stars; 9/107 (20 overs)	v	Sydney Sixers; 2/108 (17.1 overs)
Mignon du Preez 44 (47); Marizanne Kapp 3/16 (4 overs)		Ellyse Perry 39* (43); Nicola Hancock 1/19 (4 overs)

Sydney Sixers won by 8 wickets (with 17 balls remaining)
Hurstville Oval, Sydney
Umpires: Berend du Plessis and Marc Nickl
Player of the match: Marizanne Kapp (Sydney Sixers)

- Melbourne Stars won the toss and elected to bat
- Broadcast by Cricket Network
- Marizanne Kapp became the fifth player to take a WBBL hat-trick

Match 15
27 October 2019
14:00
Scorecard

Melbourne Stars; 5/141 (20 overs)	v	Sydney Thunder; 6/142 (19.4 overs)
Elyse Villani 52 (47); Rene Farrell 1/18 (4 overs)		Alex Blackwell 45* (36); Madeline Penna 4/20 (4 overs)

Sydney Thunder won by 4 wickets (with 2 balls remaining)
Bankstown Oval, Sydney
Attendance: 606
Umpires: David Taylor and Claire Polosak
Player of the match: Alex Blackwell (Sydney Thunder)

- Sydney Thunder won the toss and elected to field
- Broadcast by Cricket Network

Match 19
2 November 2019
15:55
Scorecard

Melbourne Stars; 3/155 (20 overs)	v	Perth Scorchers; 6/135 (20 overs)
Lizelle Lee 103* (65); Heather Graham 2/27 (2 overs)		Meg Lanning 40 (39); Madeline Penna 2/24 (4 overs)

Melbourne Stars won by 20 runs
WACA Ground, Perth
Umpires: Troy Penman and Trent Steenholdt
Player of the match: Lizelle Lee (Melbourne Stars)

- Perth Scorchers won the toss and elected to field
- Broadcast by Seven Network and Fox Cricket

Match 21
3 November 2019
11:10
Scorecard

Sydney Sixers; 0/199 (20 overs)	v	Melbourne Stars; 6/154 (20 overs)
Alyssa Healy 106* (53); Erin Osborne 0/31 (4 overs)		Elyse Villani 59 (44); Sarah Aley 2/18 (4 overs)

Sydney Sixers won by 45 runs
WACA Ground, Perth
Umpires: Nathan Johnstone and Trent Steenholdt
Player of the match: Alyssa Healy (Sydney Sixers)

- Sydney Sixers won the toss and elected to bat
- Broadcast by Seven Network and Fox Cricket
- Alyssa Healy and Ellyse Perry set a new record for the highest partnership in a domestic women's T20 (199 runs)

Match 29
10 November 2019
13:40
Scorecard

Adelaide Strikers; 4/164 (20 overs)	v	Melbourne Stars; 8/147 (20 overs)
Sophie Devine 85* (56); Madeline Penna 3/50 (4 overs)		Mignon du Preez 70 (51); Amanda Wellington 3/31 (4 overs)

Adelaide Strikers won by 17 runs
Karen Rolton Oval, Adelaide
Attendance: 1,569
Umpires: Craig Thomas and Darren Close
Player of the match: Sophie Devine (Adelaide Strikers)

- Melbourne Stars won the toss and elected to field
- Broadcast by Seven Network and Fox Cricket
- Sophie Devine set a new WBBL record for the most sixes scored off consecutive deliveries (five)
- Madeline Penna suffered a new WBBL record for the most expensive over bowled (31 runs)

Match 32
13 November 2019
14:00
Scorecard

Melbourne Stars; 4/165 (20 overs)	v	Brisbane Heat; 1/168 (19.3 overs)
Mignon du Preez 88 (51); Delissa Kimmince 3/27 (4 overs)		Beth Mooney 70* (60); Madeline Penna 1/34 (4 overs)

Brisbane Heat won by 9 wickets (with 3 balls remaining)
CitiPower Centre, Melbourne
Umpires: Dale Ireland and Mattis van Eck
Player of the match: Mignon du Preez (Melbourne Stars)

- Brisbane Heat won the toss and elected to field
- Broadcast by Cricket Network
- Beth Mooney became the first player to score 400 runs in five consecutive WBBL seasons

Match 35
16 November 2019
14:00
Scorecard

Adelaide Strikers; 2/153 (20 overs)	v	Melbourne Stars; 8/96 (20 overs)
Sophie Devine 77* (58); Holly Ferling 1/11 (3 overs)		Nicola Hancock 26* (23); Sophie Devine 3/13 (3 overs)

Adelaide Strikers won by 57 runs
Centennial Park Oval, Nuriootpa
Attendance: 1,831
Umpires: Craig Thomas and Mary Waldron
Player of the match: Sophie Devine (Adelaide Strikers)

- Melbourne Stars won the toss and elected to field
- Broadcast by Cricket Network

Match 39
20 November 2019
14:00
Scorecard

Melbourne Stars; 6/149 (20 overs)	v	Perth Scorchers; 1/151 (19.1 overs)
Elyse Villani 59 (56); Samantha Betts 3/21 (3 overs)		Amy Jones 70 (55); Nicola Hancock 1/19 (3 overs)

Perth Scorchers won by 9 wickets (with 5 balls remaining)
CitiPower Centre, Melbourne
Umpires: Greg Azzopardi and Mattis van Eck
Player of the match: Amy Jones (Perth Scorchers)

- Perth Scorchers won the toss and elected to field
- Broadcast by Cricket Network
- Melbourne Stars eliminated from finals contention

Match 44
23 November 2019
14:00
Scorecard

Melbourne Renegades; 3/165 (20 overs)	v	Melbourne Stars; 3/169 (19.2 overs)
Anna Lanning 73 (49); Nicola Hancock 2/35 (4 overs)		Lizelle Lee 62 (46); Lea Tahuhu 2/26 (4 overs)

Melbourne Stars won by 7 wickets (with 4 balls remaining)
Eastern Oval, Ballarat
Attendance: 2,337
Umpires: Greg Azzopardi and Daryl Brigham
Player of the match: Anna Lanning (Melbourne Renegades)

- Melbourne Stars won the toss and elected to field
- Broadcast by Cricket Network
- Brisbane Heat qualified for finals

Match 49
27 November 2019
14:30
Scorecard

Sydney Thunder; 6/162 (20 overs)	v	Melbourne Stars; 5/144 (20 overs)
Alex Blackwell 65 (47); Annabel Sutherland 2/31 (4 overs)		Mignon du Preez 55 (50); Rene Farrell 2/28 (4 overs)

Sydney Thunder won by 18 runs
Manuka Oval, Canberra
Umpires: Andrew Scotford and Andrew Crozier
Player of the match: Alex Blackwell (Sydney Thunder)

- Melbourne Stars won the toss and elected to field
- Broadcast by Cricket Network

Match 50
30 November 2019
10:40
Scorecard

Melbourne Stars; 4/162 (20 overs)	v	Melbourne Renegades; 4/163 (19.5 overs)
Lizelle Lee 70 (44); Maitlan Brown 2/24 (4 overs)		Jess Duffin 76* (57); Erin Osborne 2/36 (4 overs)

Melbourne Renegades won by 6 wickets (with 1 ball remaining)
CitiPower Centre, Melbourne
Attendance: approx. 1,000
Umpires: Daryl Brigham and Ben Treloar
Player of the match: Jess Duffin (Melbourne Renegades)

- Melbourne Renegades won the toss and elected to field
- Broadcast by Seven Network and Fox Cricket
- Sydney Thunder eliminated from finals contention

Match 55
1 December 2019
15:00
Scorecard

Melbourne Stars; 6/87 (10 overs)	v	Brisbane Heat; 2/88 (8.4 overs)
Elyse Villani 25 (17); Amelia Kerr 2/4 (2 overs)		Beth Mooney 50* (27); Annabel Sutherland 1/14 (2 overs)

Brisbane Heat won by 8 wickets (with 8 balls remaining)
CitiPower Centre, Melbourne
Umpires: Dale Ireland and Greg Azzopardi
Player of the match: Beth Mooney (Brisbane Heat)

- Brisbane Heat won the toss and elected to field
- Match reduced to 10 overs per side due to rain delay
- Broadcast by Cricket Network
- Former Australian player Kristen Beams made her last WBBL appearance

== Statistics and awards ==
- Most runs: Lizelle Lee – 475 (5th in the league)
- Highest score in an innings: Lizelle Lee – 103* vs Perth Scorchers, 2 November
- Most wickets: Erin Osborne – 11 (equal 21st in the league)
- Best bowling figures in an innings: Madeline Penna – 4/20 (4 overs) vs Sydney Thunder, 27 October
- Most catches (fielder): Elyse Villani – 5 (equal 14th in the league)
- Player of the Match awards: Mignon du Preez, Lizelle Lee – 1 each
- Stars Player of the Season: Lizelle Lee
- WBBL|05 Young Gun Award: Annabel Sutherland (nominated)
