= 2019–20 Perth Scorchers WBBL season =

Perth Scorchers
2019–20 season
- Perth Scorchers 2019–20 cap logo
- Coach: Lisa Keightley
- Captain(s): Meg Lanning
- Home ground: Lilac Hill Park
- League: WBBL
- Record: 9–5 (3rd)
- Finals: Semi-finalists
- Leading Run Scorer: Meg Lanning – 531
- Leading Wicket Taker: Heather Graham – 15
- Player of the Season: Nat Sciver

The 2019–20 Perth Scorchers Women's season was the fifth in the team's history. Coached by Lisa Keightley and captained by Meg Lanning, the Scorchers finished the regular season of WBBL|05 in third place and qualified for finals. They were subsequently knocked out of the tournament by the Adelaide Strikers in an eight wicket semi-final loss at Allan Border Field.

== Squad ==
Each 2019–20 squad featured 15 active players, with an allowance of up to five marquee signings including a maximum of three from overseas. Australian marquees are players who held a national women's team contract at the time of signing for their WBBL|05 team.

Several personnel changes were made before and during the season, including:

- Elyse Villani, inaugural member and former captain of the Scorchers, moved back to her home state to play for the Melbourne Stars.
- Overseas marquee Nat Sciver returned to the Scorchers after not partaking in the previous season, replacing England teammate Kate Cross.
- Georgia Redmayne signed with the Scorchers, departing the Hobart Hurricanes.
- Jemma Barsby signed with the Scorchers after winning a WBBL championship with the Brisbane Heat.
- Ireland marquee Kim Garth, appearing in the league for the first time since winning a second championship with the Sydney Sixers, was announced as Perth's final overseas signing for the season.
- On 30 October, Lisa Keightley was appointed as head coach of the English women's team, though she would continue in her role at the Scorchers until the end of WBBL|05.
- On 11 November, the Scorchers announced the addition of Amy Edgar to the squad as a local replacement player for Piepa Cleary who was ruled out for the remainder of the tournament due to a fractured leg sustained a week earlier while fielding during a 20-run loss at the WACA.
- Overseas marquees Nat Sciver and Amy Jones would become unavailable towards the end of the season due to national team commitments, prompting calls from recently appointed CA Board member Mel Jones for greater cooperation between nations and better planning on scheduling.

The table below lists the Scorchers players and their key stats (including runs scored, batting strike rate, wickets taken, economy rate, catches and stumpings) for the season.

No.	Name	Nat.	Birth Date	Batting style	Bowling style	G	R	SR	W	E	C	S	Notes
Batters
12	Nicole Bolton	(Australia)	17 January 1989	Left-handed	Right-arm off spin	14	180	90.90	6	7.00	4	–	Australian marquee
10	Amy Edgar	(Australia)	27 December 1997	Right-handed	Right-arm medium	–	–	–	–	–	–	–	Injury replacement
7	Meg Lanning	(Australia)	25 March 1992	Right-handed	Right-arm medium	15	531	118.26	–	–	4	–	Captain, Australian marquee
28	Chloe Piparo	(Australia)	5 September 1994	Right-handed	Right-arm off spin	15	54	94.73	–	–	7	–	
39	Nat Sciver	(England)	20 August 1992	Right-handed	Right-arm medium	13	342	123.02	6	6.75	8	–	Overseas marquee
All-rounders
5	Mathilda Carmichael	(Australia)	4 April 1994	Right-handed	Right-arm medium	2	0	0.00	–	–	0	–	
11	Heather Graham	(Australia)	10 May 1996	Right-handed	Right-arm medium	15	136	113.33	15	7.16	8	–	
Wicket-keepers
40	Amy Jones	(England)	13 June 1993	Right-handed	–	13	391	115.33	–	–	4	1	Overseas marquee
9	Georgia Redmayne	(Australia)	8 December 1993	Left-handed	–	15	137	95.13	–	–	5	1	
Bowlers
15	Jemma Barsby	(Australia)	4 October 1995	Left-handed	Right-arm off spin	15	85	96.59	5	7.65	8	–	
14	Samantha Betts	(Australia)	16 February 1996	Right-handed	Right-arm medium fast	9	1	100.00	9	7.55	0	–	
8	Piepa Cleary	(Australia)	17 July 1996	Right-handed	Right-arm medium fast	5	1	100.00	4	7.87	3	–	
34	Kim Garth	(Republic of Ireland)	25 April 1996	Right-handed	Right-arm medium fast	15	23	104.54	14	6.78	1	–	Overseas marquee
18	Kath Hempenstall	(Australia)	20 September 1988	Right-handed	Right-arm medium fast	2	–	–	–	–	0	–	
2	Emma King	(Australia)	25 March 1992	Right-handed	Right-arm off spin	4	–	–	0	8.75	0	–	
6	Taneale Peschel	(Australia)	29 August 1994	Right-handed	Right-arm medium fast	13	13	118.18	9	6.76	0	–	

== Ladder ==
Pos	Team	Pld	W	L	NR	Pts	NRR
1	Brisbane Heat (C)	14	10	4	0	20	0.723
2	Adelaide Strikers (RU)	14	10	4	0	20	0.601
3	Perth Scorchers	14	9	5	0	18	0.026
4	Melbourne Renegades	14	8	6	0	16	0.117
5	Sydney Sixers	14	7	7	0	14	−0.076
6	Sydney Thunder	14	5	8	1	11	−0.487
7	Hobart Hurricanes	14	4	9	1	9	−0.197
8	Melbourne Stars	14	2	12	0	4	−0.734

- The four top ranked teams qualified for the play-off phase.

== Fixtures ==
All times are local time

=== Regular season ===
Match 8
23 October 2019
13:00
Scorecard

Perth Scorchers; 5/132 (20 overs)	v	Melbourne Renegades; 6/133 (19.1 overs)
Natalie Sciver 55* (47); Molly Strano 2/27 (4 overs)		Danielle Wyatt 31 (29); Jemma Barsby 2/22 (3 overs)

Melbourne Renegades won by 4 wickets (with 5 balls remaining)
CitiPower Centre, Melbourne
Umpires: Dale Ireland and Greg Azzopardi
Player of the match: Sophie Molineux (Melbourne Renegades)

- Melbourne Renegades won the toss and elected to field
- Broadcast by Cricket Network

Match 10
26 October 2019
13:10
Scorecard

Brisbane Heat; 7/146 (20 overs)	v	Perth Scorchers; 1/147 (18.2 overs)
Beth Mooney 67 (55); Jemma Barsby 2/19 (4 overs)		Amy Jones 60* (49); Georgia Prestwidge 1/15 (2 overs)

Perth Scorchers won by 9 wickets (with 10 balls remaining)
Allan Border Field, Brisbane
Attendance: approx. 2,500
Umpires: David Taylor and Simon Lightbody
Player of the match: Amy Jones (Perth Scorchers)

- Perth Scorchers won the toss and elected to field
- Broadcast by Seven Network and Fox Cricket

Match 13
27 October 2019
09:40
Scorecard

Perth Scorchers; 9/115 (20 overs)	v	Adelaide Strikers; 3/116 (14.4 overs)
Nicole Bolton 41 (43); Sarah Coyte 3/18 (4 overs)		Tahlia McGrath 65* (46); Kim Garth 2/25 (3 overs)

Adelaide Strikers won by 7 wickets (with 32 balls remaining)
Allan Border Field, Brisbane
Umpires: Steven Farrell and Ben Treloar
Player of the match: Tahlia McGrath (Adelaide Strikers)

- Adelaide Strikers won the toss and elected to field
- Broadcast by Seven Network and Fox Cricket

Match 16
1 November 2019
17:40 (D/N)
Scorecard

Melbourne Renegades; 1/134 (15 overs)	v	Perth Scorchers; 2/77 (7 overs)
Danielle Wyatt 74* (51); Heather Graham 1/23 (3 overs)		Meg Lanning 44* (24); Georgia Wareham 2/13 (1 over)

Perth Scorchers won by 8 wickets (with 0 balls remaining) (D/L method)
WACA Ground, Perth
Umpires: Ashlee Gibbons and Claire Polosak
Player of the match: Meg Lanning (Perth Scorchers)

- Perth Scorchers won the toss and elected to field
- Match reduced to 15 overs per side due to rain delay
- Perth Scorchers' target revised to 73 from 7 overs due to rain delay
- Broadcast by Seven Network and Fox Cricket

Match 19
2 November 2019
15:55
Scorecard

Melbourne Stars; 3/155 (20 overs)	v	Perth Scorchers; 6/135 (20 overs)
Lizelle Lee 103* (65); Heather Graham 2/27 (2 overs)		Meg Lanning 40 (39); Madeline Penna 2/24 (4 overs)

Melbourne Stars won by 20 runs
WACA Ground, Perth
Umpires: Troy Penman and Trent Steenholdt
Player of the match: Lizelle Lee (Melbourne Stars)

- Perth Scorchers won the toss and elected to field
- Broadcast by Seven Network and Fox Cricket

Match 25
9 November 2019
13:40
Scorecard

Perth Scorchers; 3/173 (20 overs)	v	Adelaide Strikers; 4/171 (20 overs)
Amy Jones 80 (58); Sophie Devine 1/28 (4 overs)		Bridget Patterson 60 (32); Taneale Peschel 1/29 (4 overs)

Perth Scorchers won by 2 runs
Karen Rolton Oval, Adelaide
Umpires: Claire Polosak and Eloise Sheridan
Player of the match: Amy Jones (Perth Scorchers)

- Adelaide Strikers won the toss and elected to field
- Broadcast by Seven Network and Fox Cricket

Match 27
10 November 2019
10:00
Scorecard

Perth Scorchers; 5/151 (20 overs)	v	Sydney Thunder; 6/144 (20 overs)
Natalie Sciver 37 (22); Hannah Darlington 2/24 (4 overs)		Tahlia Wilson 47* (39); Heather Graham 3/22 (4 overs)

Perth Scorchers won by 7 runs
Karen Rolton Oval, Adelaide
Umpires: Harry Singh and Mary Waldron
Player of the match: Heather Graham (Perth Scorchers)

- Sydney Thunder won the toss and elected to field
- Broadcast by Cricket Network

Match 30
12 November 2019
17:30 (D/N)
Scorecard

Perth Scorchers; 6/116 (20 overs)	v	Sydney Thunder; 105 (19.4 overs)
Nat Sciver 27 (26); Rene Farrell 2/24 (4 overs)		Nida Dar 43 (39); Kim Garth 3/21 (4 overs)

Perth Scorchers won by 11 runs
WACA Ground, Perth
Umpires: Dean Trigg and James Hewitt
Player of the match: Nat Sciver (Perth Scorchers)

- Sydney Thunder won the toss and elected to field
- Broadcast by Cricket Network

Match 37
17 November 2019
10:00
Scorecard

Perth Scorchers; 8/112 (20 overs)	v	Brisbane Heat; 2/113 (16.1 overs)
Nat Sciver 26 (29); Jess Jonassen 4/23 (4 overs)		Beth Mooney 60* (44); Nat Sciver 1/17 (4 overs)

Brisbane Heat won by 8 wickets (with 23 balls remaining)
Drummoyne Oval, Sydney
Umpires: Andrew Hamilton and Sharad Patel
Player of the match: Jess Jonassen (Brisbane Heat)

- Brisbane Heat won the toss and elected to field
- Broadcast by Cricket Network

Match 39
20 November 2019
14:00
Scorecard

Melbourne Stars; 6/149 (20 overs)	v	Perth Scorchers; 1/151 (19.1 overs)
Elyse Villani 59 (56); Samantha Betts 3/21 (3 overs)		Amy Jones 70 (55); Nicola Hancock 1/19 (3 overs)

Perth Scorchers won by 9 wickets (with 5 balls remaining)
CitiPower Centre, Melbourne
Umpires: Greg Azzopardi and Mattis van Eck
Player of the match: Amy Jones (Perth Scorchers)

- Perth Scorchers won the toss and elected to field
- Broadcast by Cricket Network
- Melbourne Stars eliminated from finals contention

Match 43
23 November 2019
10:00
Scorecard

Perth Scorchers; 5/152 (20 overs)	v	Sydney Sixers; 9/100 (20 overs)
Nat Sciver 52 (37); Marizanne Kapp 2/27 (4 overs)		Lauren Smith 36* (35); Kim Garth 2/15 (4 overs)

Perth Scorchers won by 52 runs
Lilac Hill Park, Perth
Attendance: 1,125
Umpires: Ashlee Gibbons and Trent Steenholdt
Player of the match: Nat Sciver (Perth Scorchers)

- Sydney Sixers won the toss and elected to field
- Broadcast by Cricket Network

Match 47
24 November 2019
10:00
Scorecard

Sydney Sixers; 6/164 (20 overs)	v	Perth Scorchers; 2/165 (19.2 overs)
Erin Burns 60* (45); Samantha Betts 2/20 (3 overs)		Meg Lanning 81 (50); Ashleigh Gardner 2/33 (4 overs)

Perth Scorchers won by 8 wickets (with 4 balls remaining)
Lilac Hill Park, Perth
Attendance: 2,435
Umpires: Trent Steenholdt and James Hewitt
Player of the match: Meg Lanning (Perth Scorchers)

- Perth Scorchers won the toss and elected to field
- Broadcast by Cricket Network

Match 52
30 November 2019
14:00
Scorecard

Perth Scorchers; 107 (20 overs)	v	Hobart Hurricanes; 4/113 (15.4 overs)
Nicole Bolton 21 (19); Tayla Vlaeminck 2/19 (4 overs)		Erin Fazackerley 58 (48); Taneale Peschel 2/33 (3.4 overs)

Hobart Hurricanes won by 6 wickets (with 26 balls remaining)
Lilac Hill Park, Perth
Umpires: Dean Trigg and Ashlee Gibbons
Player of the match: Erin Fazackerley (Hobart Hurricanes)

- Hobart Hurricanes won the toss and elected to field
- Broadcast by Cricket Network

Match 56
1 December 2019
14:00
Scorecard

Perth Scorchers; 4/167 (20 overs)	v	Hobart Hurricanes; 6/132 (20 overs)
Meg Lanning 101 (67); Nicola Carey 2/25 (4 overs)		Heather Knight 36 (36); Taneale Peschel 2/22 (4 overs)

Perth Scorchers won by 35 runs
Lilac Hill Park, Perth
Umpires: Dean Trigg and Ashlee Gibbons
Player of the match: Meg Lanning (Perth Scorchers)

- Hobart Hurricanes won the toss and elected to field
- Broadcast by Cricket Network

=== Knockout phase ===
Semi-final 1
7 December 2019
10:10
Scorecard

Perth Scorchers; 7/126 (20 overs)	v	Adelaide Strikers; 2/130 (18.1 overs)
Georgia Redmayne 51 (42); Megan Schutt 2/14 (4 overs)		Sophie Devine 65* (46); Kim Garth 1/33 (4 overs)

Adelaide Strikers won by 8 wickets (with 11 balls remaining)
Allan Border Field, Brisbane
Umpires: Darren Close and Simon Lightbody
Player of the match: Sophie Devine (Adelaide Strikers)

- Adelaide Strikers won the toss and elected to field
- Broadcast by Seven Network and Fox Cricket

== Statistics and awards ==
- Most runs: Meg Lanning – 531 (4th in the league)
- Highest score in an innings: Meg Lanning – 101 (67) vs Hobart Hurricanes, 1 December
- Most wickets: Heather Graham – 15 (equal 11th in the league)
- Best bowling figures in an innings: Kim Garth – 3/21 (4 overs) vs Sydney Thunder, 12 November
- Most catches (fielder): Jemma Barsby, Heather Graham, Nat Sciver – 8 each (equal 4th in the league)
- Player of the Match awards:
  - Amy Jones, Meg Lanning – 3 each
  - Nat Sciver – 2
  - Heather Graham – 1
- Scorchers Player of the Year: Nat Sciver
- WBBL|05 Player of the Tournament: Meg Lanning (equal 4th)
- WBBL|05 Team of the Tournament: Meg Lanning
