= 2019–20 Adelaide Strikers WBBL season =

Adelaide Strikers
2019–20 season
- Adelaide Strikers 2019–20 cap logo
- Coach: Luke Williams
- Captain(s): Suzie Bates
- Home ground: Karen Rolton Oval
- League: WBBL
- Record: 10–4 (2nd)
- Finals: Runners-up
- Leading Run Scorer: Sophie Devine – 769
- Leading Wicket Taker: Sarah Coyte – 19; Sophie Devine – 19
- Player of the Season: Sophie Devine

The 2019–20 Adelaide Strikers Women's season was the fifth in the team's history. Coached by Luke Williams and captained by Suzie Bates, the Strikers finished second in the regular season of WBBL|05 and qualified for finals. Propelled by Player of the Tournament Sophie Devine, they reached the championship decider against the Brisbane Heat at Allan Border Field but were defeated by six wickets to ultimately place as runners-up.

== Squad ==
Each 2019–20 squad featured 15 active players, with an allowance of up to five marquee signings including a maximum of three from overseas. Australian marquees are players who held a national women's team contract at the time of signing for their WBBL|05 team.

Notable details for the squad included:

- New Zealand marquee Sophie Devine returned for the Strikers to become one of only two overseas players, along with South African Marizanne Kapp (member of the Sydney Sixers), to play in each of the first five WBBL seasons with one team.
- Luke Williams was appointed as head coach, taking over from Andrea McCauley.
- Katie Mack joined the Strikers after spending four seasons with the Melbourne Stars.
- Overseas marquee Stafanie Taylor moved across from the Sydney Thunder but was unavailable for the middle portion of the season due to national team commitments with the West Indies.
- England marquee Lauren Winfield was signed as a replacement player—initially for 10 games but this tenure was extended due to a knee injury to Taylor. Winfield, however, would be unavailable for finals due to national team commitments, prompting calls from recently appointed CA Board member Mel Jones for greater cooperation between nations and better planning on scheduling.

The table below lists the Strikers players and their key stats (including runs scored, batting strike rate, wickets taken, economy rate, catches and stumpings) for the season.

No.	Name	Nat.	Birth date	Batting style	Bowling style	G	R	SR	W	E	C	S	Notes
Batters
11	Suzie Bates	(New Zealand)	16 September 1987	Right-handed	Right-arm medium	16	325	99.38	7	7.60	7	–	Captain, overseas marquee
2	Katie Mack	(Australia)	14 September 1993	Right-handed	Right-arm leg spin	16	56	91.80	–	–	5	–	
5	Annie O'Neil	(Australia)	18 February 1999	Right-handed	Right-arm leg spin	3	–	–	–	–	1	–	
21	Bridget Patterson	(Australia)	4 December 1994	Right-handed	Right-arm medium	16	319	117.71	–	–	10	–	
13	Tabatha Saville	(Australia)	13 April 1998	Right-handed	Right-arm off spin	–	–	–	–	–	–	–	
58	Lauren Winfield	(England)	16 August 1990	Right-handed	–	12	105	93.75	–	–	4	–	Overseas marquee (replacement)
All-rounders
77	Sophie Devine	(New Zealand)	1 September 1989	Right-handed	Right-arm medium fast	16	769	130.33	19	6.77	10	–	Overseas marquee
9	Tahlia McGrath	(Australia)	10 November 1995	Right-handed	Right-arm medium	16	327	106.86	14	6.66	2	–	
28	Stafanie Taylor	(Jamaica)	11 June 1991	Right-handed	Right-arm off spin	2	33	106.45	3	7.14	1	–	Overseas marquee
Wicket-keepers
7	Tegan McPharlin	(Australia)	7 August 1988	Right-handed	–	16	38	100.00	–	–	4	5	
Bowlers
20	Darcie Brown	(Australia)	7 March 2003	Right-handed	Right-arm medium fast	–	–	–	–	–	–	–	
15	Sarah Coyte	(Australia)	30 March 1991	Right-handed	Right-arm medium fast	16	26	173.33	19	6.94	4	–	
3	Ellie Falconer	(Australia)	3 August 1999	Right-handed	Right-arm medium fast	–	–	–	–	–	–	–	
12	Alex Price	(Australia)	5 November 1995	Right-handed	Right-arm off spin	15	–	–	0	8.85	3	–	
27	Megan Schutt	(Australia)	15 January 1993	Right-handed	Right-arm medium fast	16	–	–	15	5.60	4	–	Australian marquee
10	Amanda-Jade Wellington	(Australia)	29 May 1997	Right-handed	Right-arm leg spin	16	104	157.57	16	7.01	5	–	Australian marquee

== Ladder ==
Pos	Team	Pld	W	L	NR	Pts	NRR
1	Brisbane Heat (C)	14	10	4	0	20	0.723
2	Adelaide Strikers (RU)	14	10	4	0	20	0.601
3	Perth Scorchers	14	9	5	0	18	0.026
4	Melbourne Renegades	14	8	6	0	16	0.117
5	Sydney Sixers	14	7	7	0	14	−0.076
6	Sydney Thunder	14	5	8	1	11	−0.487
7	Hobart Hurricanes	14	4	9	1	9	−0.197
8	Melbourne Stars	14	2	12	0	4	−0.734

- The four top ranked teams qualified for the play-off phase.

== Fixtures ==
All times are local time

=== Regular season ===
Match 3
19 October 2019
14:00
Scorecard

Melbourne Renegades; 8/117 (20 overs)	v	Adelaide Strikers; 4/120 (15.2 overs)
Jess Duffin 44 (32); Stafanie Taylor 3/26 (4 overs)		Sophie Devine 72* (45); Maitlan Brown 2/15 (3 overs)

Adelaide Strikers won by 6 wickets (with 28 balls remaining)
Karen Rolton Oval, Adelaide
Umpires: Harry Singh and Craig Thomas
Player of the match: Sophie Devine (Adelaide Strikers)

- Adelaide Strikers won the toss and elected to field
- Broadcast by Cricket Network

Match 7
20 October 2019
14:10
Scorecard

Adelaide Strikers; 5/152 (20 overs)	v	Melbourne Renegades; 5/154 (19 overs)
Sophie Devine 48 (30); Maitlan Brown 2/20 (4 overs)		Danielle Wyatt 61 (37); Sophie Devine 2/32 (4 overs)

Melbourne Renegades won by 5 wickets (with 6 balls remaining)
Karen Rolton Oval, Adelaide
Umpires: Eloise Sheridan and Mary Waldron
Player of the match: Danielle Wyatt (Melbourne Renegades)

- Adelaide Strikers won the toss and elected to bat
- Broadcast by Cricket Network

Match 9
26 October 2019
09:40
Scorecard

Adelaide Strikers; 8/113 (20 overs)	v	Hobart Hurricanes; 7/110 (20 overs)
Sarah Coyte 24 (13); Maisy Gibson 2/15 (4 overs)		Nicola Carey 39 (37); Amanda-Jade Wellington 2/18 (3 overs)

Adelaide Strikers won by 3 runs
Allan Border Field, Brisbane
Umpires: Darren Close and Stephen Dionysius
Player of the match: Sarah Coyte (Adelaide Strikers)

- Hobart Hurricanes won the toss and elected to field
- Broadcast by Seven Network and Fox Cricket

Match 13
27 October 2019
09:40
Scorecard

Perth Scorchers; 9/115 (20 overs)	v	Adelaide Strikers; 3/116 (14.4 overs)
Nicole Bolton 41 (43); Sarah Coyte 3/18 (4 overs)		Tahlia McGrath 65* (46); Kim Garth 2/25 (3 overs)

Adelaide Strikers won by 7 wickets (with 32 balls remaining)
Allan Border Field, Brisbane
Umpires: Steven Farrell and Ben Treloar
Player of the match: Tahlia McGrath (Adelaide Strikers)

- Adelaide Strikers won the toss and elected to field
- Broadcast by Seven Network and Fox Cricket

Match 20
2 November 2019
18:15 (D/N)
Scorecard

Brisbane Heat; 139 (19.1 overs)	v	Adelaide Strikers; 2/143 (19 overs)
Beth Mooney 73 (49); Sophie Devine 2/21 (3 overs)		Bridget Patterson 57* (43); Amelia Kerr 1/24 (4 overs)

Adelaide Strikers won by 8 wickets (with 6 balls remaining)
Harrup Park, Mackay
Umpires: Steven Farrell and David Taylor
Player of the match: Bridget Patterson (Adelaide Strikers)

- Adelaide Strikers won the toss and elected to field
- Broadcast by Cricket Network

Match 22
3 November 2019
15:00
Scorecard

Adelaide Strikers; 8/141 (20 overs)	v	Brisbane Heat; 1/142 (17.1 overs)
Sophie Devine 65 (53); Georgia Prestwidge 3/29 (4 overs)		Beth Mooney 77* (51); Amanda Wellington 1/16 (2.1 overs)

Brisbane Heat won by 9 wickets (with 17 balls remaining)
Harrup Park, Mackay
Umpires: Steven Farrell and David Taylor
Player of the match: Beth Mooney (Brisbane Heat)

- Adelaide Strikers won the toss and elected to bat
- Broadcast by Cricket Network

Match 25
9 November 2019
13:40
Scorecard

Perth Scorchers; 3/173 (20 overs)	v	Adelaide Strikers; 4/171 (20 overs)
Amy Jones 80 (58); Sophie Devine 1/28 (4 overs)		Bridget Patterson 60 (32); Taneale Peschel 1/29 (4 overs)

Perth Scorchers won by 2 runs
Karen Rolton Oval, Adelaide
Umpires: Claire Polosak and Eloise Sheridan
Player of the match: Amy Jones (Perth Scorchers)

- Adelaide Strikers won the toss and elected to field
- Broadcast by Seven Network and Fox Cricket

Match 29
10 November 2019
13:40
Scorecard

Adelaide Strikers; 4/164 (20 overs)	v	Melbourne Stars; 8/147 (20 overs)
Sophie Devine 85* (56); Madeline Penna 3/50 (4 overs)		Mignon du Preez 70 (51); Amanda Wellington 3/31 (4 overs)

Adelaide Strikers won by 17 runs
Karen Rolton Oval, Adelaide
Attendance: 1,569
Umpires: Craig Thomas and Darren Close
Player of the match: Sophie Devine (Adelaide Strikers)

- Melbourne Stars won the toss and elected to field
- Broadcast by Seven Network and Fox Cricket
- Sophie Devine set a new WBBL record for the most sixes scored off consecutive deliveries (five)
- Madeline Penna suffered a new WBBL record for the most expensive over bowled (31 runs)

Match 35
16 November 2019
14:00
Scorecard

Adelaide Strikers; 2/153 (20 overs)	v	Melbourne Stars; 8/96 (20 overs)
Sophie Devine 77* (58); Holly Ferling 1/11 (3 overs)		Nicola Hancock 26* (23); Sophie Devine 3/13 (3 overs)

Adelaide Strikers won by 57 runs
Centennial Park Oval, Nuriootpa
Attendance: 1,831
Umpires: Craig Thomas and Mary Waldron
Player of the match: Sophie Devine (Adelaide Strikers)

- Melbourne Stars won the toss and elected to field
- Broadcast by Cricket Network

Match 40
20 November 2019
14:30
Scorecard

Sydney Thunder; 4/112 (20 overs)	v	Adelaide Strikers; 4/113 (19.1 overs)
Rachael Haynes 33 (27); Amanda-Jade Wellington 1/10 (2 overs)		Sophie Devine 62* (58); Nida Dar 2/21 (4 overs)

Adelaide Strikers won by 6 wickets (with 5 balls remaining)
North Dalton Park, Wollongong
Attendance: 892
Umpires: Andrew Hamilton and Bede Sajowitz
Player of the match: Sophie Devine (Adelaide Strikers)

- Sydney Thunder won the toss and elected to bat
- Broadcast by Cricket Network

Match 45
23 November 2019
19:10 (D/N)
Scorecard

Adelaide Strikers; 3/143 (20 overs)	v	Hobart Hurricanes; 7/141 (20 overs)
Suzie Bates 64 (54); Heather Knight 1/22 (4 overs)		Chloe Tryon 44* (22); Amanda-Jade Wellington 3/23 (4 overs)

Adelaide Strikers won by 2 runs
Blundstone Arena, Hobart
Umpires: Troy Penman and Muhammad Qureshi
Player of the match: Suzie Bates (Adelaide Strikers)

- Hobart Hurricanes won the toss and elected to field
- Broadcast by Seven Network and Fox Cricket
- Hobart Hurricanes eliminated from finals contention

Match 46
24 November 2019
10:00
Scorecard

Adelaide Strikers; 6/161 (20 overs)	v	Sydney Thunder; 6/161 (20 overs)
Sophie Devine 88 (56); Hannah Darlington 3/29 (4 overs)		Rachel Priest 48 (20); Amanda-Jade Wellington 3/17 (4 overs)

Adelaide Strikers won in a super over
Blundstone Arena, Hobart
Umpires: Muhammad Qureshi and Jeremiah Matibiri
Player of the match: Sophie Devine (Adelaide Strikers)

- Sydney Thunder won the toss and elected to field
- Broadcast by Cricket Network
- Adelaide Strikers qualified for finals

Match 51
30 November 2019
14:00
Scorecard

Sydney Sixers; 9/93 (20 overs)	v	Adelaide Strikers; 2/94 (15.1 overs)
Marizanne Kapp 20 (20); Sarah Coyte 3/9 (4 overs)		Sophie Devine 46* (43); Marizanne Kapp 1/8 (3 overs)

Adelaide Strikers won by 8 wickets (with 29 balls remaining)
Hurstville Oval, Sydney
Umpires: Roberto Howard and Marc Nickl
Player of the match: Sarah Coyte (Adelaide Strikers)

- Sydney Sixers won the toss and elected to bat
- Broadcast by Cricket Network
- Perth Scorchers qualified for finals
- Adelaide Strikers defeated Sydney Sixers for the first time in WBBL history

Match 54
1 December 2019
14:00
Scorecard

Sydney Sixers; 7/177 (20 overs)	v	Adelaide Strikers; 7/164 (20 overs)
Alyssa Healy 84 (38); Sarah Coyte 2/27 (4 overs)		Sophie Devine 60 (38); Stella Campbell 2/12 (3 overs)

Sydney Sixers won by 13 runs
Hurstville Oval, Sydney
Umpires: Roberto Howard and Marc Nickl
Player of the match: Alyssa Healy (Sydney Sixers)

- Adelaide Strikers won the toss and elected to field
- Broadcast by Cricket Network

=== Knockout phase ===
Semi-final 1
7 December 2019
10:10
Scorecard

Perth Scorchers; 7/126 (20 overs)	v	Adelaide Strikers; 2/130 (18.1 overs)
Georgia Redmayne 51 (42); Megan Schutt 2/14 (4 overs)		Sophie Devine 65* (46); Kim Garth 1/33 (4 overs)

Adelaide Strikers won by 8 wickets (with 11 balls remaining)
Allan Border Field, Brisbane
Umpires: Darren Close and Simon Lightbody
Player of the match: Sophie Devine (Adelaide Strikers)

- Adelaide Strikers won the toss and elected to field
- Broadcast by Seven Network and Fox Cricket

Final
8 December 2019
13:40
Scorecard

Adelaide Strikers; 7/161 (20 overs)	v	Brisbane Heat; 4/162 (18.1 overs)
Amanda-Jade Wellington 55 (33); Jess Jonassen 2/30 (4 overs)		Beth Mooney 56* (45); Tahlia McGrath 2/34 (4 overs)

Brisbane Heat won by 6 wickets (with 11 balls remaining)
Allan Border Field, Brisbane
Attendance: 2,700
Umpires: Claire Polosak and Ben Treloar
Player of the match: Beth Mooney (Brisbane Heat)

- Brisbane Heat won the toss and elected to field
- Broadcast by Seven Network and Fox Cricket
- Brisbane Heat won their second WBBL title

== Statistics and awards ==
- Most runs: Sophie Devine – 769 (1st in the league)
- Highest score in an innings: Sophie Devine – 88 (56) vs Sydney Thunder, 24 November
- Most wickets: Sarah Coyte, Sophie Devine – 19 each (equal 4th in the league)
- Best bowling figures in an innings: Sarah Coyte – 3/9 (4 overs) vs Sydney Sixers, 30 November
- Most catches (fielder): Sophie Devine, Bridget Patterson – 10 each (equal 1st in the league)
- Player of the Match awards:
  - Sophie Devine – 6
  - Sarah Coyte – 2
  - Suzie Bates, Tahlia McGrath, Bridget Patterson – 1 each
- Strikers Most Valuable Player: Sophie Devine
- WBBL|05 Player of the Tournament: Sophie Devine (winner)
- WBBL|05 Team of the Tournament: Sophie Devine, Megan Schutt
