= 2019–20 Women's Big Bash League season =

2019–20 Women's Big Bash League
- Dates: 18 October 2019 – 8 December 2019
- Administrator: Cricket Australia
- Cricket format: Twenty20
- Tournament format(s): Double round robin and knockout finals
- Champions: Brisbane Heat (2nd title)
- Runners-up: Adelaide Strikers
- Participants: 8
- Matches: 59
- Player of the series: Sophie Devine (ADS)
- Most runs: Sophie Devine (ADS) – 769
- Most wickets: Molly Strano (MLR) – 24
- Official website: WBBL

The 2019–20 Women's Big Bash League season or WBBL|05 was the fifth season of the Women's Big Bash League (WBBL), the semi-professional women's Twenty20 domestic cricket competition in Australia. The tournament moved to a standalone calendar slot, shifting away from the men's BBL, beginning on 18 October and running to 8 December 2019.

The Sydney Sixers entered the season as "hot favourites", but they lost five consecutive games in the back-half of the tournament and missed out on qualifying for finals for the first time after captain Ellyse Perry sustained a shoulder injury. Defending champions Brisbane Heat finished the regular season on top of the ladder, earning the right to host all three playoff matches at Allan Border Field.

The Heat retained their title on 8 December 2019 when they defeated first-time finalist Adelaide Strikers, featuring Player of the Tournament Sophie Devine, by six wickets in the championship decider. Beth Mooney was named Player of the Final for the second consecutive season.

== Teams ==
Each 2019–20 squad featured 15 active players, with an allowance of up to five marquee signings including a maximum of three from overseas. Australian marquees were defined as players who held a national women's team contract at the time of signing on for their WBBL|05 team.

The table below lists each team's marquee players and other key details for the season.

Team	Home ground (Note: Number of games hosted at each venue is indicated in brackets)	Secondary grounds	Coach	Captain	Australian representatives (Note: Only includes players who debuted for Australia before the tournament)	Overseas players
Adelaide Strikers	Karen Rolton Oval (4)	Centennial Park Oval (1)	Luke Williams	Suzie Bates	Megan Schutt; Amanda-Jade Wellington; Sarah Coyte (Note: Player did not hold a Cricket Australia contract at the beginning of the WBBL|05 signing period); Tahlia McGrath	Suzie Bates; Sophie Devine; Stafanie Taylor; Lauren Winfield (Note: Replacement player)
Brisbane Heat	Allan Border Field (5)	Harrup Park (2)	Ashley Noffke	Kirby Short	Jess Jonassen; Delissa Kimmince; Beth Mooney; Grace Harris	Maddy Green; Amelia Kerr
Hobart Hurricanes	Blundstone Arena (2)	West Park Oval (2); Invermay Park (1)	Salliann Briggs	Corinne Hall	Nicola Carey; Belinda Vakarewa; Tayla Vlaeminck	Heather Knight; Chloe Tryon; Fran Wilson; Hayley Matthews
Melbourne Renegades	CitiPower Centre (5)	Eastern Oval (1)	Tim Coyle	Jess Duffin (Note: Molly Strano stood in as acting captain for one game)	Sophie Molineux; Georgia Wareham; Jess Duffin; Molly Strano	Tammy Beaumont; Lea Tahuhu; Danielle Wyatt; Chamari Atapattu
Melbourne Stars	CitiPower Centre (6)	–	David Hemp	Elyse Villani	Elyse Villani; Kristen Beams; Holly Ferling; Erin Osborne	Mignon du Preez; Lizelle Lee; Katey Martin
Perth Scorchers	Lilac Hill Park (4)	WACA Ground (3)	Lisa Keightley	Meg Lanning	Nicole Bolton; Meg Lanning; Heather Graham	Kim Garth; Amy Jones; Nat Sciver
Sydney Sixers	North Sydney Oval (4)	Hurstville Oval (3); Drummoyne Oval (1)	Ben Sawyer	Ellyse Perry (Note: Alyssa Healy stood in as acting captain for five games)	Ashleigh Gardner; Alyssa Healy; Ellyse Perry; Sarah Aley; Erin Burns; Lauren Cheatle	Dane van Niekerk; Marizanne Kapp; Hollie Armitage
Sydney Thunder	Drummoyne Oval (2)	Bankstown Oval (1); Blacktown ISP Oval (1); Manuka Oval (1); North Dalton Park (1); North Sydney Oval (1)	Trevor Griffin	Rachael Haynes (Note: Alex Blackwell stood in as acting captain for one game)	Rachael Haynes; Alex Blackwell; Rene Farrell; Naomi Stalenberg	Nida Dar; Shabnim Ismail; Rachel Priest

=== Personnel changes ===
The pre-season was noted as particularly busy for player transfers which produced some of the biggest recruiting achievements in the tournament's five-year history.

==== Local players ====
The table below lists local player movements made ahead of the season.

Player	Departed	→	Joined	Notes	Ref(s)
Nicola Carey	Sydney Thunder	→	Hobart Hurricanes	Australian marquee	
Belinda Vakarewa	Sydney Thunder	→	Hobart Hurricanes		
Maisy Gibson	Sydney Thunder	→	Hobart Hurricanes		
Tayla Vlaeminck	Melbourne Renegades	→	Hobart Hurricanes		
Josie Dooley	Brisbane Heat	→	Melbourne Renegades		
Jemma Barsby	Brisbane Heat	→	Perth Scorchers		
Elyse Villani	Perth Scorchers	→	Melbourne Stars	Australian marquee	
Katie Mack	Melbourne Stars	→	Adelaide Strikers		
Emily Smith	Perth Scorchers	→	Hobart Hurricanes	Returning to the Hobart Hurricanes	
Georgia Redmayne	Hobart Hurricanes	→	Perth Scorchers		
Mikayla Hinkley	Hobart Hurricanes	→	Brisbane Heat	Fourth WBBL team (previously played for the Sydney Thunder and Perth Scorchers)	
Lauren Ebsary	Perth Scorchers	→	–	Retired	
Veronica Pyke	Hobart Hurricanes	→	–	Retired	
Samantha Betts	Adelaide Strikers	→	Perth Scorchers		
Tahlia Wilson	Sydney Sixers	→	Sydney Thunder		
Carly Leeson	Sydney Sixers	→	Melbourne Renegades		

Changes made during the season included:

- On 18 November 2019, Emily Smith was banned for the remainder of WBBL|05 after contravening Cricket Australia's anti-corruption policy with a social media post. Under a special exemption, Tasmanian Tigers member Emma Manix-Geeves was brought into the Hobart Hurricanes squad as a replacement.

==== Overseas players ====
Harmanpreet Kaur and Smriti Mandhana did not re-sign for the Sydney Thunder and Hobart Hurricanes respectively on account of a conflicting national team schedule, marking the first WBBL season to not feature any Indian-born players. This fixturing clash followed a dispute between the BCCI and CA earlier in the year when Australia's top talent (such as Meg Lanning, Ellyse Perry and Alyssa Healy) were excluded from the 2019 Women's T20 Challenge—an exhibition tournament serving as a potential precursor to a future female equivalent of the Indian Premier League. ESPNcricinfo reported this breakdown was part of a wider disagreement between the two boards that revolved around the BCCI's insistence on CA honouring a touring commitment to play a men's bi-lateral ODI series in India in January 2020.

The table below lists changes to overseas player allocations made ahead of the season.

Player	Departed	→	Joined	Notes	Ref(s)
Tammy Beaumont	–	→	Melbourne Renegades	Previously played for the Adelaide Strikers	
Chloe Tryon	–	→	Hobart Hurricanes		
Fran Wilson	–	→	Hobart Hurricanes	Previously played for the Sydney Thunder	
Nat Sciver	–	→	Perth Scorchers	Returning to the Perth Scorchers	
Kim Garth	–	→	Perth Scorchers	Previously played for the Sydney Sixers	
Maddy Green	–	→	Brisbane Heat		
Amelia Kerr	–	→	Brisbane Heat		
Stafanie Taylor	Sydney Thunder	→	Adelaide Strikers		
Lauren Winfield	–	→	Adelaide Strikers	Replacement player; Third WBBL team (previously played for the Brisbane Heat and Hobart Hurricanes)	
Nida Dar	–	→	Sydney Thunder	First Pakistani woman to sign with an international cricket league	
Shabnim Ismail	–	→	Sydney Thunder	Previously played for the Melbourne Renegades	
Danielle Hazell	Adelaide Strikers	→	–		
Suné Luus	Brisbane Heat	→	–		
Laura Wolvaardt	Brisbane Heat	→	–		
Smriti Mandhana	Hobart Hurricanes	→	–		
Alex Hartley	Hobart Hurricanes	→	–		
Amy Satterthwaite	Melbourne Renegades	→	–	Maternity leave	
Georgia Elwiss	Melbourne Stars	→	–		
Kate Cross	Perth Scorchers	→	–		
Hayley Jensen	Perth Scorchers	→	–		
Sara McGlashan	Sydney Sixers	→	–	Retired	
Harmanpreet Kaur	Sydney Thunder	→	–		

Changes made during the season included:

- On 19 November, the Sydney Sixers announced the signing of English marquee Hollie Armitage, replacing captain Ellyse Perry who would miss five games due to a shoulder injury.
- After scoring a T20I century for Sri Lanka against Australia on 29 September 2019, Chamari Atapattu stated in a post-match press conference she had not been offered a contract for the upcoming Women's Big Bash League season despite her eagerness to participate again (she had previously played for the Melbourne Renegades in WBBL|03), underlining the league's fierce competition for marquee signings. However, it was announced on 30 November that Atapattu had signed with the Renegades for their last regular season game and finals. She replaced Tammy Beaumont who—along with Danni Wyatt, Nat Sciver, Amy Jones and Lauren Winfield—would miss out on the WBBL|05 finals due to national team commitments.

==== Leadership ====
Coaching changes made ahead of the season included:

- Ashley Noffke was appointed head coach of the Brisbane Heat, replacing Peter McGiffin.
- Trevor Griffin was appointed head coach of the Sydney Thunder, replacing Joanne Broadbent.
- Luke Williams was appointed head coach of the Adelaide Strikers, replacing Andrea McCauley.

Captaincy changes made ahead of the season included:

- Corinne Hall reassumed the captaincy of the Hobart Hurricanes, after Sasha Moloney (2–12 (Note: Includes two losses via Super Over) win–loss record) stepped into the position for a season.
- Jess Duffin was appointed captain of the Melbourne Renegades, replacing Amy Satterthwaite. Despite not playing due to maternity leave, the Renegades announced Satterthwaite would continue to contribute off-field in a specialist coaching capacity throughout WBBL|05.
- Rachael Haynes was appointed captain of the Sydney Thunder, replacing Alex Blackwell (36–22 (Note: Includes one win and one loss via Super Over; does not include future results)).
- Elyse Villani was appointed captain of the Melbourne Stars, replacing Kristen Beams (7–12 (Note: Includes one win via Super Over)).

Captaincy changes made during the season included:

- Alex Blackwell stood in as acting captain of the Sydney Thunder for one game on 10 November, replacing Rachael Haynes who was sidelined with a foot injury.
- Molly Strano stood in as acting captain of the Melbourne Renegades for one game on 17 November, replacing Jess Duffin. It was later revealed Duffin was sidelined due to morning sickness.
- Alyssa Healy stood in as acting captain of the Sydney Sixers for five games from 20 November to 1 December, replacing Ellyse Perry who was sidelined with a shoulder injury.

== Standings ==
=== Points table ===
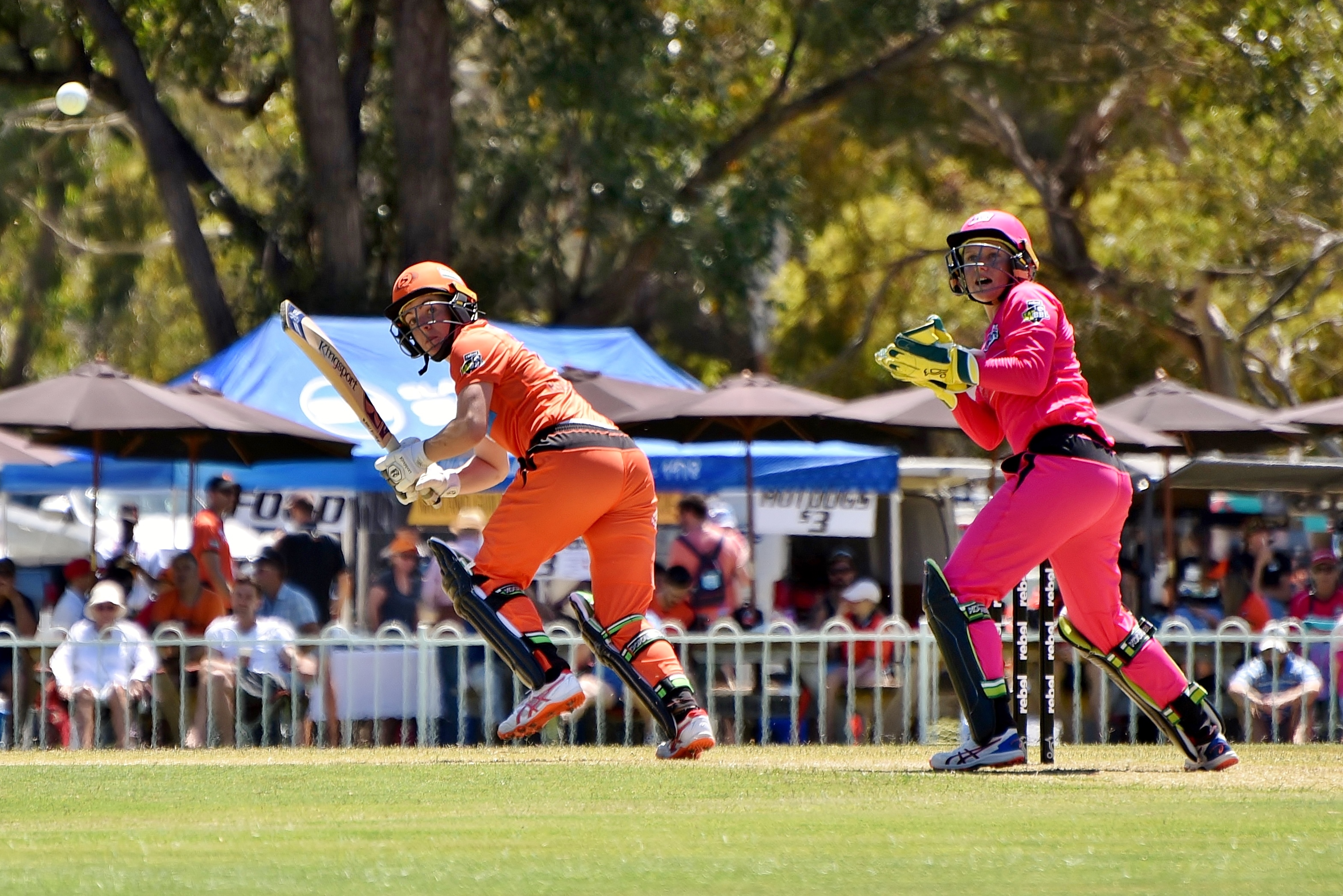
Georgia Redmayne batting for Perth Scorchers against Sydney Sixers at Lilac Hill Park, Perth, on 23 November 2019. The Sixers' wicket-keeper and stand-in captain, Alyssa Healy, looks on. The Scorchers later won the match by 52 runs.

Pos	Team	Pld	W	L	NR	Pts	NRR
1	Brisbane Heat (C)	14	10	4	0	20	0.723
2	Adelaide Strikers (RU)	14	10	4	0	20	0.601
3	Perth Scorchers	14	9	5	0	18	0.026
4	Melbourne Renegades	14	8	6	0	16	0.117
5	Sydney Sixers	14	7	7	0	14	−0.076
6	Sydney Thunder	14	5	8	1	11	−0.487
7	Hobart Hurricanes	14	4	9	1	9	−0.197
8	Melbourne Stars	14	2	12	0	4	−0.734

- The four top ranked teams qualified for the play-off phase.

=== Win–loss table ===
Below is a summary of results for each team's fourteen regular season matches, plus finals where applicable, in chronological order. A team's opponent for any given match is listed above the margin of victory/defeat.

Team	1	2	3	4	5	6	7	8	9	10	11	12	13	14	SF	F	Pos.
Adelaide Strikers (ADS)	MLR; 6 wkts	MLR; 5 wkts	HBH; 3 runs	PRS; 7 wkts	BRH; 8 wkts	BRH; 9 wkts	PRS; 2 runs	MLS; 17 runs	MLS; 57 runs	SYT; 6 wkts	HBH; 2 runs	SYT; S/O	SYS; 8 wkts	SYS; 13 runs	PRS; 8 wkts	BRH; 6 wkts	2nd (RU)
Brisbane Heat (BRH)	SYS; 92 runs	SYT; 7 wkts	PRS; 9 wkts	HBH; 5 wkts	ADS; 8 wkts	ADS; 9 wkts	SYS; 7 wkts	MLS; 9 wkts	SYT; 32 runs	PRS; 8 wkts	MLR; 6 runs	HBH; 7 runs	MLR; 6 wkts	MLS; 8 wkts	MLR; 4 wkts	ADS; 6 wkts	1st (C)
Hobart Hurricanes (HBH)	MLS; 20 runs	MLS; 5 wkts	ADS; 3 runs	BRH; 5 wkts	SYT; N/R	SYT; 6 wkts	MLR; 4 wkts	MLR; 8 wkts	SYS; 39 runs	SYS; 5 wkts	BRH; 7 runs	ADS; 2 runs	PRS; 6 wkts	PRS; 35 runs	X	X	7th
Melbourne Renegades (MLR)	ADS; 6 wkts	ADS; 5 wkts	PRS; 4 wkts	SYT; 3 runs	PRS; 8 wkts	SYS; 4 wkts	HBH; 4 wkts	HBH; 8 wkts	SYS; 2 wkts	BRH; 6 runs	MLS; 7 wkts	BRH; 6 wkts	MLS; 6 wkts	SYT; 29 runs	BRH; 4 wkts	X	4th (SF)
Melbourne Stars (MLS)	HBH; 20 runs	HBH; 5 wkts	SYS; 8 wkts	SYT; 4 wkts	PRS; 20 runs	SYS; 45 runs	ADS; 17 runs	BRH; 9 wkts	ADS; 57 runs	PRS; 9 wkts	MLR; 7 wkts	SYT; 18 runs	MLR; 6 wkts	BRH; 8 wkts	X	X	8th
Perth Scorchers (PRS)	MLR; 4 wkts	BRH; 9 wkts	ADS; 7 wkts	MLR; 8 wkts	MLS; 20 runs	ADS; 2 runs	SYT; 7 runs	SYT; 11 runs	BRH; 8 wkts	MLS; 9 wkts	SYS; 52 runs	SYS; 8 wkts	HBH; 6 wkts	HBH; 35 runs	ADS; 8 wkts	X	3rd (SF)
Sydney Sixers (SYS)	SYT; 49 runs	BRH; 92 runs	MLS; 8 wkts	MLR; 4 wkts	MLS; 45 runs	BRH; 7 wkts	HBH; 39 runs	SYT; 40 runs	MLR; 2 wkts	HBH; 5 wkts	PRS; 52 runs	PRS; 8 wkts	ADS; 8 wkts	ADS; 13 runs	X	X	5th
Sydney Thunder (SYT)	SYS; 49 runs	BRH; 7 wkts	MLR; 3 runs	MLS; 4 wkts	HBH; N/R	HBH; 6 wkts	PRS; 7 runs	PRS; 11 runs	SYS; 40 runs	BRH; 32 runs	ADS; 6 wkts	ADS; S/O	MLS; 18 runs	MLR; 29 runs	X	X	6th

Team's results→	Won	Tied	Lost	N/R

== Fixtures ==
All times are local time

=== Week 1 ===
Match 1
18 October 2019
19:40 (D/N)
Scorecard

Sydney Sixers; 6/192 (20 overs)	v	Sydney Thunder; 9/143 (20 overs)
Ellyse Perry 81 (48); Nida Dar 2/44 (4 overs)		Alex Blackwell 56 (38); Sarah Aley 3/28 (4 overs)

Sydney Sixers won by 49 runs
North Sydney Oval, Sydney
Attendance: 1,891
Umpires: Simon Lightbody and Marc Nickl
Player of the match: Ellyse Perry (Sydney Sixers)

- Sydney Sixers won the toss and elected to bat
- Broadcast by Seven Network and Fox Cricket

Match 2
19 October 2019
14:00
Scorecard

Hobart Hurricanes; 5/164 (20 overs)	v	Melbourne Stars; 9/144 (20 overs)
Chloe Tryon 46* (18); Erin Osborne 2/44 (4 overs)		Erin Osborne 40 (37); Maisy Gibson 3/26 (4 overs)

Hobart Hurricanes won by 20 runs
CitiPower Centre, Melbourne
Umpires: Greg Azzopardi and Daryl Brigham
Player of the match: Belinda Vakarewa (Hobart Hurricanes)

- Melbourne Stars won the toss and elected to field
- Broadcast by Cricket Network

Match 3
19 October 2019
14:00
Scorecard

Melbourne Renegades; 8/117 (20 overs)	v	Adelaide Strikers; 4/120 (15.2 overs)
Jess Duffin 44 (32); Stafanie Taylor 3/26 (4 overs)		Sophie Devine 72* (45); Maitlan Brown 2/15 (3 overs)

Adelaide Strikers won by 6 wickets (with 28 balls remaining)
Karen Rolton Oval, Adelaide
Umpires: Harry Singh and Craig Thomas
Player of the match: Sophie Devine (Adelaide Strikers)

- Adelaide Strikers won the toss and elected to field
- Broadcast by Cricket Network

Match 4
19 October 2019
19:40 (D/N)
Scorecard

Brisbane Heat; 6/165 (20 overs)	v	Sydney Sixers; 73 (14.4 overs)
Beth Mooney 50 (45); Hayley Silver-Holmes 2/35 (4 overs)		Ellyse Perry 27 (30); Amelia Kerr 3/8 (3 overs)

Brisbane Heat won by 92 runs
North Sydney Oval, Sydney
Umpires: Darren Close and Berend du Plessis
Player of the match: Laura Harris (Brisbane Heat)

- Brisbane Heat won the toss and elected to bat
- Broadcast by Seven Network and Fox Cricket

Match 5
20 October 2019
14:10
Scorecard

Melbourne Stars; 7/136 (20 overs)	v	Hobart Hurricanes; 5/137 (18.3 overs)
Lizelle Lee 25 (21); Belinda Vakarewa 2/22 (4 overs)		Nicola Carey 60* (46); Kristen Beams 2/23 (3 overs)

Hobart Hurricanes won by 5 wickets (with 9 balls remaining)
CitiPower Centre, Melbourne
Attendance: 488
Umpires: Dale Ireland and Mattis van Eck
Player of the match: Nicola Carey (Hobart Hurricanes)

- Hobart Hurricanes won the toss and elected to field
- Broadcast by Cricket Network

Match 6
20 October 2019
14:10
Scorecard

Brisbane Heat; 9/150 (20 overs)	v	Sydney Thunder; 3/153 (18.5 overs)
Jess Jonassen 42 (34); Samantha Bates 3/33 (4 overs)		Phoebe Litchfield 52* (48); Grace Harris 1/19 (3 overs)

Sydney Thunder won by 7 wickets (with 7 balls remaining)
North Sydney Oval, Sydney
Umpires: Troy Penman and Andrew Hamilton
Player of the match: Phoebe Litchfield (Sydney Thunder)

- Brisbane Heat won the toss and elected to bat
- Broadcast by Seven Network and Fox Cricket
- Phoebe Litchfield became the youngest player to score a half-century in the WBBL

Thunder batters Alex Blackwell and Phoebe Litchfield set a new WBBL record for highest fourth-wicket partnership in their pursuit of the Heat's 9/150. The unbeaten 97-run stand, which got the Thunder over the line with seven balls to spare, was noted for the 20-year age gap between the two batting partners. At 16 years and 185 days, Litchfield also set a new WBBL record as the youngest player to score a half-century.

Match 7
20 October 2019
14:10
Scorecard

Adelaide Strikers; 5/152 (20 overs)	v	Melbourne Renegades; 5/154 (19 overs)
Sophie Devine 48 (30); Maitlan Brown 2/20 (4 overs)		Danielle Wyatt 61 (37); Sophie Devine 2/32 (4 overs)

Melbourne Renegades won by 5 wickets (with 6 balls remaining)
Karen Rolton Oval, Adelaide
Umpires: Eloise Sheridan and Mary Waldron
Player of the match: Danielle Wyatt (Melbourne Renegades)

- Adelaide Strikers won the toss and elected to bat
- Broadcast by Cricket Network

=== Week 2 ===
Match 8
23 October 2019
13:00
Scorecard

Perth Scorchers; 5/132 (20 overs)	v	Melbourne Renegades; 6/133 (19.1 overs)
Natalie Sciver 55* (47); Molly Strano 2/27 (4 overs)		Danielle Wyatt 31 (29); Jemma Barsby 2/22 (3 overs)

Melbourne Renegades won by 4 wickets (with 5 balls remaining)
CitiPower Centre, Melbourne
Umpires: Dale Ireland and Greg Azzopardi
Player of the match: Sophie Molineux (Melbourne Renegades)

- Melbourne Renegades won the toss and elected to field
- Broadcast by Cricket Network

Match 9
26 October 2019
09:40
Scorecard

Adelaide Strikers; 8/113 (20 overs)	v	Hobart Hurricanes; 7/110 (20 overs)
Sarah Coyte 24 (13); Maisy Gibson 2/15 (4 overs)		Nicola Carey 39 (37); Amanda-Jade Wellington 2/18 (3 overs)

Adelaide Strikers won by 3 runs
Allan Border Field, Brisbane
Umpires: Darren Close and Stephen Dionysius
Player of the match: Sarah Coyte (Adelaide Strikers)

- Hobart Hurricanes won the toss and elected to field
- Broadcast by Seven Network and Fox Cricket

Match 10
26 October 2019
13:10
Scorecard

Brisbane Heat; 7/146 (20 overs)	v	Perth Scorchers; 1/147 (18.2 overs)
Beth Mooney 67 (55); Jemma Barsby 2/19 (4 overs)		Amy Jones 60* (49); Georgia Prestwidge 1/15 (2 overs)

Perth Scorchers won by 9 wickets (with 10 balls remaining)
Allan Border Field, Brisbane
Attendance: approx. 2,500
Umpires: David Taylor and Simon Lightbody
Player of the match: Amy Jones (Perth Scorchers)

- Perth Scorchers won the toss and elected to field
- Broadcast by Seven Network and Fox Cricket

Match 11
26 October 2019
14:00
Scorecard

Melbourne Stars; 9/107 (20 overs)	v	Sydney Sixers; 2/108 (17.1 overs)
Mignon du Preez 44 (47); Marizanne Kapp 3/16 (4 overs)		Ellyse Perry 39* (43); Nicola Hancock 1/19 (4 overs)

Sydney Sixers won by 8 wickets (with 17 balls remaining)
Hurstville Oval, Sydney
Umpires: Berend du Plessis and Marc Nickl
Player of the match: Marizanne Kapp (Sydney Sixers)

- Melbourne Stars won the toss and elected to bat
- Broadcast by Cricket Network
- Marizanne Kapp became the fifth player to take a WBBL hat-trick, joining Nicole Bolton, Gemma Triscari, Amy Satterthwaite and Dane van Niekerk

Match 12
26 October 2019
19:00 (D/N)
Scorecard

Sydney Thunder; 8/132 (20 overs)	v	Melbourne Renegades; 8/129 (20 overs)
Rachael Haynes 36 (33); Maitlan Brown 3/22 (4 overs)		Jess Duffin 69 (56); Shabnim Ismail 3/14 (4 overs)

Sydney Thunder won by 3 runs
Blacktown International Sportspark, Sydney
Attendance: 925
Umpires: Roberto Howard and Andrew Hamilton
Player of the match: Shabnim Ismail (Sydney Thunder)

- Melbourne Renegades won the toss and elected to field
- Broadcast by Cricket Network

Match 13
27 October 2019
09:40
Scorecard

Perth Scorchers; 9/115 (20 overs)	v	Adelaide Strikers; 3/116 (14.4 overs)
Nicole Bolton 41 (43); Sarah Coyte 3/18 (4 overs)		Tahlia McGrath 65* (46); Kim Garth 2/25 (3 overs)

Adelaide Strikers won by 7 wickets (with 32 balls remaining)
Allan Border Field, Brisbane
Umpires: Steven Farrell and Ben Treloar
Player of the match: Tahlia McGrath (Adelaide Strikers)

- Adelaide Strikers won the toss and elected to field
- Broadcast by Seven Network and Fox Cricket

Match 14
27 October 2019
13:10
Scorecard

Hobart Hurricanes; 8/123 (20 overs)	v	Brisbane Heat; 5/124 (19.5 overs)
Heather Knight 61* (49); Jess Jonassen 4/20 (4 overs)		Beth Mooney 44* (50); Nicola Carey, Maisy Gibson 1/18 (4 overs)

Brisbane Heat won by 5 wickets (with 1 ball remaining)
Allan Border Field, Brisbane
Attendance: approx. 1,600
Umpires: Andrew Hamilton and Berend du Plessis
Player of the match: Jess Jonassen (Brisbane Heat)

- Brisbane Heat won the toss and elected to field
- Broadcast by Seven Network and Fox Cricket

Match 15
27 October 2019
14:00
Scorecard

Melbourne Stars; 5/141 (20 overs)	v	Sydney Thunder; 6/142 (19.4 overs)
Elyse Villani 52 (47); Rene Farrell 1/18 (4 overs)		Alex Blackwell 45* (36); Madeline Penna 4/20 (4 overs)

Sydney Thunder won by 4 wickets (with 2 balls remaining)
Bankstown Oval, Sydney
Attendance: 606
Umpires: David Taylor and Claire Polosak
Player of the match: Alex Blackwell (Sydney Thunder)

- Sydney Thunder won the toss and elected to field
- Broadcast by Cricket Network

=== Week 3 ===
Match 16
1 November 2019
17:40 (D/N)
Scorecard

Melbourne Renegades; 1/134 (15 overs)	v	Perth Scorchers; 2/77 (7 overs)
Danielle Wyatt 74* (51); Heather Graham 1/23 (3 overs)		Meg Lanning 44* (24); Georgia Wareham 2/13 (1 over)

Perth Scorchers won by 8 wickets (with 0 balls remaining) (D/L method)
WACA Ground, Perth
Umpires: Ashlee Gibbons and Claire Polosak
Player of the match: Meg Lanning (Perth Scorchers)

- Perth Scorchers won the toss and elected to field
- Match reduced to 15 overs per side due to rain delay
- Perth Scorchers' target revised to 73 from 7 overs due to rain delay
- Broadcast by Seven Network and Fox Cricket

Match 17
2 November 2019
14:00
Scorecard

Hobart Hurricanes	v	Sydney Thunder

Match abandoned without a ball bowled
West Park Oval, Burnie
Umpires: Darren Close and G Beechey

- No toss was possible due to rain
- Broadcast by Cricket Network

Match 18
2 November 2019
12:10
Scorecard

Melbourne Renegades; 8/120 (20 overs)	v	Sydney Sixers; 6/121 (19.5 overs)
Jess Duffin 34* (22); Dane van Niekerk 2/15 (4 overs)		Ellyse Perry 45* (50); Maitlan Brown 2/18 (4 overs)

Sydney Sixers won by 4 wickets (with 1 ball remaining)
WACA Ground, Perth
Umpires: Nathan Johnstone and James Hewitt
Player of the match: Dane van Niekerk (Sydney Sixers)

- Sydney Sixers won the toss and elected to field
- Broadcast by Seven Network and Fox Cricket

Match 19
2 November 2019
15:55
Scorecard

Melbourne Stars; 3/155 (20 overs)	v	Perth Scorchers; 6/135 (20 overs)
Lizelle Lee 103* (65); Heather Graham 2/27 (2 overs)		Meg Lanning 40 (39); Madeline Penna 2/24 (4 overs)

Melbourne Stars won by 20 runs
WACA Ground, Perth
Umpires: Troy Penman and Trent Steenholdt
Player of the match: Lizelle Lee (Melbourne Stars)

- Perth Scorchers won the toss and elected to field
- Broadcast by Seven Network and Fox Cricket

Match 20
2 November 2019
18:15 (D/N)
Scorecard

Brisbane Heat; 139 (19.1 overs)	v	Adelaide Strikers; 2/143 (19 overs)
Beth Mooney 73 (49); Sophie Devine 2/21 (3 overs)		Bridget Patterson 57* (43); Amelia Kerr 1/24 (4 overs)

Adelaide Strikers won by 8 wickets (with 6 balls remaining)
Harrup Park, Mackay
Umpires: Steven Farrell and David Taylor
Player of the match: Bridget Patterson (Adelaide Strikers)

- Adelaide Strikers won the toss and elected to field
- Broadcast by Cricket Network

Match 21
3 November 2019
11:10
Scorecard

Sydney Sixers; 0/199 (20 overs)	v	Melbourne Stars; 6/154 (20 overs)
Alyssa Healy 106* (53); Erin Osborne 0/31 (4 overs)		Elyse Villani 59 (44); Sarah Aley 2/18 (4 overs)

Sydney Sixers won by 45 runs
WACA Ground, Perth
Umpires: Nathan Johnstone and Trent Steenholdt
Player of the match: Alyssa Healy (Sydney Sixers)

- Sydney Sixers won the toss and elected to bat
- Broadcast by Seven Network and Fox Cricket
- Alyssa Healy and Ellyse Perry set a new record for the highest partnership in a domestic women's T20 (199 runs)

Match 22
3 November 2019
15:00
Scorecard

Adelaide Strikers; 8/141 (20 overs)	v	Brisbane Heat; 1/142 (17.1 overs)
Sophie Devine 65 (53); Georgia Prestwidge 3/29 (4 overs)		Beth Mooney 77* (51); Amanda Wellington 1/16 (2.1 overs)

Brisbane Heat won by 9 wickets (with 17 balls remaining)
Harrup Park, Mackay
Umpires: Steven Farrell and David Taylor
Player of the match: Beth Mooney (Brisbane Heat)

- Adelaide Strikers won the toss and elected to bat
- Broadcast by Cricket Network

Match 23
3 November 2019
11:00
Scorecard

Hobart Hurricanes; 6/148 (20 overs)	v	Sydney Thunder; 4/149 (18.1 overs)
Heather Knight 77 (49); Nida Dar 2/16 (4 overs)		Rachel Priest 50 (34); Maisy Gibson 2/28 (4 overs)

Sydney Thunder won by 6 wickets (with 11 balls remaining)
West Park Oval, Burnie
Umpires: Darren Close and Simon Burns
Player of the match: Rachel Priest (Sydney Thunder)

- Sydney Thunder won the toss and elected to field
- Broadcast by Cricket Network

=== Week 4 ===
Match 24
9 November 2019
13:00
Scorecard

Hobart Hurricanes; 5/150 (20 overs)	v	Melbourne Renegades; 6/151 (20 overs)
Corinne Hall 50* (34); Sophie Molineux 2/25 (4 overs)		Jess Duffin 75 (49); Belinda Vakarewa 2/21 (4 overs)

Melbourne Renegades won by 4 wickets (with 0 balls remaining)
CitiPower Centre, Melbourne
Umpires: Dale Ireland and Greg Azzopardi
Player of the match: Jess Duffin (Melbourne Renegades)

- Melbourne Renegades won the toss and elected to field
- Broadcast by Cricket Network

Match 25
9 November 2019
13:40
Scorecard

Perth Scorchers; 3/173 (20 overs)	v	Adelaide Strikers; 4/171 (20 overs)
Amy Jones 80 (58); Sophie Devine 1/28 (4 overs)		Bridget Patterson 60 (32); Taneale Peschel 1/29 (4 overs)

Perth Scorchers won by 2 runs
Karen Rolton Oval, Adelaide
Umpires: Claire Polosak and Eloise Sheridan
Player of the match: Amy Jones (Perth Scorchers)

- Adelaide Strikers won the toss and elected to field
- Broadcast by Seven Network and Fox Cricket

Match 26
9 November 2019
15:00
Scorecard

Sydney Sixers; 7/123 (20 overs)	v	Brisbane Heat; 3/127 (16.5 overs)
Dane van Niekerk 28 (32); Jess Jonassen 2/20 (4 overs)		Jess Jonassen 33 (28); Dane van Niekerk 2/19 (4 overs)

Brisbane Heat won by 7 wickets (with 19 balls remaining)
North Sydney Oval, Sydney
Umpires: Roberto Howard and Berend du Plessis
Player of the match: Jess Jonassen (Brisbane Heat)

- Sydney Sixers won the toss and elected to bat
- Broadcast by Cricket Network

Match 27
10 November 2019
10:00
Scorecard

Perth Scorchers; 5/151 (20 overs)	v	Sydney Thunder; 6/144 (20 overs)
Natalie Sciver 37 (22); Hannah Darlington 2/24 (4 overs)		Tahlia Wilson 47* (39); Heather Graham 3/22 (4 overs)

Perth Scorchers won by 7 runs
Karen Rolton Oval, Adelaide
Umpires: Harry Singh and Mary Waldron
Player of the match: Heather Graham (Perth Scorchers)

- Sydney Thunder won the toss and elected to field
- Broadcast by Cricket Network

Match 28
10 November 2019
13:00
Scorecard

Hobart Hurricanes; 8/108 (20 overs)	v	Melbourne Renegades; 2/109 (15.4 overs)
Heather Knight 20 (24); Molly Strano 3/19 (4 overs)		Danielle Wyatt 45 (44); Belinda Vakarewa 2/16 (4 overs)

Melbourne Renegades won by 8 wickets (with 26 balls remaining)
CitiPower Centre, Melbourne
Umpires: Daryl Brigham and Mattis van Eck
Player of the match: Molly Strano (Melbourne Renegades)

- Melbourne Renegades won the toss and elected to field
- Broadcast by Cricket Network

Match 29
10 November 2019
13:40
Scorecard

Adelaide Strikers; 4/164 (20 overs)	v	Melbourne Stars; 8/147 (20 overs)
Sophie Devine 85* (56); Madeline Penna 3/50 (4 overs)		Mignon du Preez 70 (51); Amanda Wellington 3/31 (4 overs)

Adelaide Strikers won by 17 runs
Karen Rolton Oval, Adelaide
Attendance: 1,569
Umpires: Craig Thomas and Darren Close
Player of the match: Sophie Devine (Adelaide Strikers)

- Melbourne Stars won the toss and elected to field
- Broadcast by Seven Network and Fox Cricket
- Sophie Devine set a new WBBL record for the most sixes scored off consecutive deliveries (five)
- Madeline Penna suffered a new WBBL record for the most expensive over bowled (31 runs)

=== Week 5 ===
Match 30
12 November 2019
17:30 (D/N)
Scorecard

Perth Scorchers; 6/116 (20 overs)	v	Sydney Thunder; 105 (19.4 overs)
Nat Sciver 27 (26); Rene Farrell 2/24 (4 overs)		Nida Dar 43 (39); Kim Garth 3/21 (4 overs)

Perth Scorchers won by 11 runs
WACA Ground, Perth
Umpires: Dean Trigg and James Hewitt
Player of the match: Nat Sciver (Perth Scorchers)

- Sydney Thunder won the toss and elected to field
- Broadcast by Cricket Network

Match 31
13 November 2019
11:00
Scorecard

Sydney Sixers; 2/172 (20 overs)	v	Hobart Hurricanes; 133 (18 overs)
Ellyse Perry 70* (56); Heather Knight 1/30 (4 overs)		Corinne Hall 31 (22); Erin Burns 3/5 (2 overs)

Sydney Sixers won by 39 runs
Invermay Park, Launceston
Attendance: 1,008
Umpires: G Beechey and Simon Burns
Player of the match: Ellyse Perry (Sydney Sixers)

- Hobart Hurricanes won the toss and elected to field
- Broadcast by Cricket Network

Match 32
13 November 2019
14:00
Scorecard

Melbourne Stars; 4/165 (20 overs)	v	Brisbane Heat; 1/168 (19.3 overs)
Mignon du Preez 88 (51); Delissa Kimmince 3/27 (4 overs)		Beth Mooney 70* (60); Madeline Penna 1/34 (4 overs)

Brisbane Heat won by 9 wickets (with 3 balls remaining)
CitiPower Centre, Melbourne
Umpires: Dale Ireland and Mattis van Eck
Player of the match: Mignon du Preez (Melbourne Stars)

- Brisbane Heat won the toss and elected to field
- Broadcast by Cricket Network
- Beth Mooney became the first player to score 400 runs in five consecutive WBBL seasons

Match 33
15 November 2019
19:10 (D/N)
Scorecard

Sydney Sixers; 3/152 (20 overs)	v	Sydney Thunder; 8/112 (20 overs)
Ellyse Perry 81 (70); Samantha Bates 1/20 (4 overs)		Rene Farrell 23 (16); Sarah Aley 2/16 (4 overs)

Sydney Sixers won by 40 runs
Drummoyne Oval, Sydney
Attendance: 1,517
Umpires: Ben Treloar and Marc Nickl
Player of the match: Ellyse Perry (Sydney Sixers)

- Sydney Thunder won the toss and elected to field
- Broadcast by Seven Network and Fox Cricket

Match 34
16 November 2019
19:10 (D/N)
Scorecard

Brisbane Heat; 8/128 (20 overs)	v	Sydney Thunder; 96 (19.1 overs)
Laura Harris 30 (22); Nida Dar 2/15 (4 overs)		Tahlia Wilson 19 (27); Jess Jonassen 4/13 (4 overs)

Brisbane Heat won by 32 runs
Drummoyne Oval, Sydney
Attendance: 921
Umpires: Troy Penman and Marc Nickl
Player of the match: Amelia Kerr (Brisbane Heat)

- Sydney Thunder won the toss and elected to field
- Broadcast by Seven Network and Fox Cricket

Match 35
16 November 2019
14:00
Scorecard

Adelaide Strikers; 2/153 (20 overs)	v	Melbourne Stars; 8/96 (20 overs)
Sophie Devine 77* (58); Holly Ferling 1/11 (3 overs)		Nicola Hancock 26* (23); Sophie Devine 3/13 (3 overs)

Adelaide Strikers won by 57 runs
Centennial Park Oval, Nuriootpa
Attendance: 1,831
Umpires: Craig Thomas and Mary Waldron
Player of the match: Sophie Devine (Adelaide Strikers)

- Melbourne Stars won the toss and elected to field
- Broadcast by Cricket Network

Match 36
17 November 2019
14:10
Scorecard

Sydney Sixers; 4/139 (20 overs)	v	Melbourne Renegades; 8/141 (20 overs)
Marizanne Kapp 52* (34); Lea Tahuhu 2/20 (4 overs)		Danielle Wyatt 55 (43); Erin Burns 2/23 (4 overs)

Melbourne Renegades won by 2 wickets (with 0 balls remaining)
Drummoyne Oval, Sydney
Umpires: Keiran Knight and Simon Lightbody
Player of the match: Courtney Webb (Melbourne Renegades)

- Melbourne Renegades won the toss and elected to field
- Broadcast by Seven Network and Fox Cricket

The Renegades, requiring 28 runs off the last 12 deliveries with only three wickets in hand, pulled off a "great escape" victory against the Sixers through a last-ball six from Courtney Webb against the bowling of Marizanne Kapp. It marked the first time a WBBL team had won a match when needing more than four runs off the final legal delivery. (Note: In a 20 January 2017 match, the Melbourne Stars initially required 6 runs off the last ball but the Hobart Hurricanes conceded a boundary off a no-ball, and the Stars went on to score just one run off the final legal delivery to secure victory. The bowler was Amy Satterthwaite and the on-strike batter was Jess Duffin—two future Renegades captains who would both coincidentally miss the 17 November 2019 game due to pregnancy-related reasons.) The ramifications of the result were season-shaping as the Renegades went on to edge out the Sixers for fourth spot on the ladder, making it the first season the Sixers would fail to qualify for finals.

Match 37
17 November 2019
10:00
Scorecard

Perth Scorchers; 8/112 (20 overs)	v	Brisbane Heat; 2/113 (16.1 overs)
Nat Sciver 26 (29); Jess Jonassen 4/23 (4 overs)		Beth Mooney 60* (44); Nat Sciver 1/17 (4 overs)

Brisbane Heat won by 8 wickets (with 23 balls remaining)
Drummoyne Oval, Sydney
Umpires: Andrew Hamilton and Sharad Patel
Player of the match: Jess Jonassen (Brisbane Heat)

- Brisbane Heat won the toss and elected to field
- Broadcast by Cricket Network

=== Week 6 ===
Match 38
20 November 2019
10:00
Scorecard

Brisbane Heat; 5/153 (20 overs)	v	Melbourne Renegades; 9/147 (20 overs)
Jess Jonassen 63* (29); Georgia Wareham 2/27 (4 overs)		Danielle Wyatt 40 (18); Sammy-Jo Johnson 2/30 (4 overs)

Brisbane Heat won by 6 runs
CitiPower Centre, Melbourne
Umpires: Dale Ireland and Daryl Brigham
Player of the match: Jess Jonassen (Brisbane Heat)

- Melbourne Renegades won the toss and elected to field
- Broadcast by Cricket Network

Match 39
20 November 2019
14:00
Scorecard

Melbourne Stars; 6/149 (20 overs)	v	Perth Scorchers; 1/151 (19.1 overs)
Elyse Villani 59 (56); Samantha Betts 3/21 (3 overs)		Amy Jones 70 (55); Nicola Hancock 1/19 (3 overs)

Perth Scorchers won by 9 wickets (with 5 balls remaining)
CitiPower Centre, Melbourne
Umpires: Greg Azzopardi and Mattis van Eck
Player of the match: Amy Jones (Perth Scorchers)

- Perth Scorchers won the toss and elected to field
- Broadcast by Cricket Network
- Melbourne Stars eliminated from finals contention

Match 40
20 November 2019
14:30
Scorecard

Sydney Thunder; 4/112 (20 overs)	v	Adelaide Strikers; 4/113 (19.1 overs)
Rachael Haynes 33 (27); Amanda-Jade Wellington 1/10 (2 overs)		Sophie Devine 62* (58); Nida Dar 2/21 (4 overs)

Adelaide Strikers won by 6 wickets (with 5 balls remaining)
North Dalton Park, Wollongong
Attendance: 892
Umpires: Andrew Hamilton and Bede Sajowitz
Player of the match: Sophie Devine (Adelaide Strikers)

- Sydney Thunder won the toss and elected to bat
- Broadcast by Cricket Network

Match 41
20 November 2019
17:30 (D/N)
Scorecard

Sydney Sixers; 7/134 (20 overs)	v	Hobart Hurricanes; 5/139 (18.2 overs)
Marizanne Kapp 55* (40); Belinda Vakarewa 4/19 (4 overs)		Nicola Carey 55* (46); Marizanne Kapp 3/23 (3.2 overs)

Hobart Hurricanes won by 5 wickets (with 10 balls remaining)
North Sydney Oval, Sydney
Umpires: Roberto Howard and Berend du Plessis
Player of the match: Belinda Vakarewa (Hobart Hurricanes)

- Sydney Sixers won the toss and elected to bat
- Broadcast by Cricket Network
- Hobart Hurricanes defeated Sydney Sixers for the first time in WBBL history

The Sixers entered the match having defeated the Hurricanes in their first eleven encounters, holding a WBBL record for the longest head-to-head winning streak. With captain Ellyse Perry sidelined due to a shoulder injury, they faltered early to a score of 5/30. A resurgence, led by Marizanne Kapp's unbeaten 55 off 40 balls, helped Sydney to a total of 7/134. Hobart's chase got off to a shaky start as they found themselves down 4/22 after five overs. A healthy partnership between batters Nicola Carey and Corinne Hall came to an end in the 15th over when Hall was spectacularly caught by former Hurricanes player Erin Burns in the outfield. With 44 runs required from the final 33 deliveries, Carey went on to make 55 not out while a quickfire 29 by Chloe Tryon sealed victory for the Hurricanes with five wickets in hand and ten balls remaining. In addition to snapping their elongated head-to-head losing streak, the win set a new mark for Hobart's highest successful run chase. Belinda Vakarewa, who sliced through the Sixers' top-order, was named Player of the Match for her bowling figures of 4/19.

Match 42
22 November 2019
19:10 (D/N)
Scorecard

Brisbane Heat; 9/157 (20 overs)	v	Hobart Hurricanes; 7/150 (20 overs)
Grace Harris 43 (27); Belinda Vakarewa 3/17 (4 overs)		Erin Fazackerley 35 (21); Amelia Kerr 2/16 (4 overs)

Brisbane Heat won by 7 runs
Blundstone Arena, Hobart
Umpires: Darren Close and Jeremiah Matibiri
Player of the match: Amelia Kerr (Brisbane Heat)

- Hobart Hurricanes won the toss and elected to field
- Broadcast by Seven Network and Fox Cricket

Match 43
23 November 2019
10:00
Scorecard

Perth Scorchers; 5/152 (20 overs)	v	Sydney Sixers; 9/100 (20 overs)
Nat Sciver 52 (37); Marizanne Kapp 2/27 (4 overs)		Lauren Smith 36* (35); Kim Garth 2/15 (4 overs)

Perth Scorchers won by 52 runs
Lilac Hill Park, Perth
Attendance: 1,125
Umpires: Ashlee Gibbons and Trent Steenholdt
Player of the match: Nat Sciver (Perth Scorchers)

- Sydney Sixers won the toss and elected to field
- Broadcast by Cricket Network

Match 44
23 November 2019
14:00
Scorecard

Melbourne Renegades; 3/165 (20 overs)	v	Melbourne Stars; 3/169 (19.2 overs)
Anna Lanning 73 (49); Nicola Hancock 2/35 (4 overs)		Lizelle Lee 62 (46); Lea Tahuhu 2/26 (4 overs)

Melbourne Stars won by 7 wickets (with 4 balls remaining)
Eastern Oval, Ballarat
Attendance: 2,337
Umpires: Greg Azzopardi and Daryl Brigham
Player of the match: Anna Lanning (Melbourne Renegades)

- Melbourne Stars won the toss and elected to field
- Broadcast by Cricket Network
- Brisbane Heat qualified for finals

Match 45
23 November 2019
19:10 (D/N)
Scorecard

Adelaide Strikers; 3/143 (20 overs)	v	Hobart Hurricanes; 7/141 (20 overs)
Suzie Bates 64 (54); Heather Knight 1/22 (4 overs)		Chloe Tryon 44* (22); Amanda-Jade Wellington 3/23 (4 overs)

Adelaide Strikers won by 2 runs
Blundstone Arena, Hobart
Umpires: Troy Penman and Muhammad Qureshi
Player of the match: Suzie Bates (Adelaide Strikers)

- Hobart Hurricanes won the toss and elected to field
- Broadcast by Seven Network and Fox Cricket
- Hobart Hurricanes eliminated from finals contention

Match 46
24 November 2019
10:00
Scorecard

Adelaide Strikers; 6/161 (20 overs)	v	Sydney Thunder; 6/161 (20 overs)
Sophie Devine 88 (56); Hannah Darlington 3/29 (4 overs)		Rachel Priest 48 (20); Amanda-Jade Wellington 3/17 (4 overs)

Adelaide Strikers won the Super Over
Blundstone Arena, Hobart
Umpires: Muhammad Qureshi and Jeremiah Matibiri
Player of the match: Sophie Devine (Adelaide Strikers)

- Sydney Thunder won the toss and elected to field
- Broadcast by Cricket Network
- Adelaide Strikers qualified for finals

Match 47
24 November 2019
10:00
Scorecard

Sydney Sixers; 6/164 (20 overs)	v	Perth Scorchers; 2/165 (19.2 overs)
Erin Burns 60* (45); Samantha Betts 2/20 (3 overs)		Meg Lanning 81 (50); Ashleigh Gardner 2/33 (4 overs)

Perth Scorchers won by 8 wickets (with 4 balls remaining)
Lilac Hill Park, Perth
Attendance: 2,435
Umpires: Trent Steenholdt and James Hewitt
Player of the match: Meg Lanning (Perth Scorchers)

- Perth Scorchers won the toss and elected to field
- Broadcast by Cricket Network

=== Week 7 ===
Match 48
27 November 2019
13:10
Scorecard

Brisbane Heat; 4/183 (20 overs)	v	Melbourne Renegades; 4/185 (19 overs)
Beth Mooney 86 (57); Danielle Wyatt 2/26 (3 overs)		Danielle Wyatt 87 (55); Georgia Prestwidge 1/20 (2 overs)

Melbourne Renegades won by 6 wickets (with 6 balls remaining)
Allan Border Field, Brisbane
Umpires: Steven Farrell and Stephen Dionysius
Player of the match: Danielle Wyatt (Melbourne Renegades)

- Melbourne Renegades won the toss and elected to field
- Broadcast by Cricket Network
- Melbourne Renegades set a new record for highest successful run chase in WBBL history

Match 49
27 November 2019
14:30
Scorecard

Sydney Thunder; 6/162 (20 overs)	v	Melbourne Stars; 5/144 (20 overs)
Alex Blackwell 65 (47); Annabel Sutherland 2/31 (4 overs)		Mignon du Preez 55 (50); Rene Farrell 2/28 (4 overs)

Sydney Thunder won by 18 runs
Manuka Oval, Canberra
Umpires: Andrew Scotford and Andrew Crozier
Player of the match: Alex Blackwell (Sydney Thunder)

- Melbourne Stars won the toss and elected to field
- Broadcast by Cricket Network

Match 50
30 November 2019
10:40
Scorecard

Melbourne Stars; 4/162 (20 overs)	v	Melbourne Renegades; 4/163 (19.5 overs)
Lizelle Lee 70 (44); Maitlan Brown 2/24 (4 overs)		Jess Duffin 76* (57); Erin Osborne 2/36 (4 overs)

Melbourne Renegades won by 6 wickets (with 1 ball remaining)
CitiPower Centre, Melbourne
Attendance: approx. 1,000
Umpires: Daryl Brigham and Ben Treloar
Player of the match: Jess Duffin (Melbourne Renegades)

- Melbourne Renegades won the toss and elected to field
- Broadcast by Seven Network and Fox Cricket
- Sydney Thunder eliminated from finals contention

Match 51
30 November 2019
14:00
Scorecard

Sydney Sixers; 9/93 (20 overs)	v	Adelaide Strikers; 2/94 (15.1 overs)
Marizanne Kapp 20 (20); Sarah Coyte 3/9 (4 overs)		Sophie Devine 46* (43); Marizanne Kapp 1/8 (3 overs)

Adelaide Strikers won by 8 wickets (with 29 balls remaining)
Hurstville Oval, Sydney
Umpires: Roberto Howard and Marc Nickl
Player of the match: Sarah Coyte (Adelaide Strikers)

- Sydney Sixers won the toss and elected to bat
- Broadcast by Cricket Network
- Perth Scorchers qualified for finals
- Adelaide Strikers defeated Sydney Sixers for the first time in WBBL history

Match 52
30 November 2019
14:00
Scorecard

Perth Scorchers; 107 (20 overs)	v	Hobart Hurricanes; 4/113 (15.4 overs)
Nicole Bolton 21 (19); Tayla Vlaeminck 2/19 (4 overs)		Erin Fazackerley 58 (48); Taneale Peschel 2/33 (3.4 overs)

Hobart Hurricanes won by 6 wickets (with 26 balls remaining)
Lilac Hill Park, Perth
Umpires: Dean Trigg and Ashlee Gibbons
Player of the match: Erin Fazackerley (Hobart Hurricanes)

- Hobart Hurricanes won the toss and elected to field
- Broadcast by Cricket Network

Match 53
1 December 2019
10:40
Scorecard

Melbourne Renegades; 6/151 (20 overs)	v	Sydney Thunder; 7/122 (20 overs)
Jess Duffin 53 (44); Samantha Bates 3/21 (4 overs)		Naomi Stalenberg 28 (30); Molly Strano 3/26 (4 overs)

Melbourne Renegades won by 29 runs
CitiPower Centre, Melbourne
Umpires: Claire Polosak and Mattis van Eck
Player of the match: Molly Strano (Melbourne Renegades)

- Sydney Thunder won the toss and elected to field
- Broadcast by Seven Network and Fox Cricket
- Melbourne Renegades qualified for finals, Sydney Sixers eliminated from finals contention
- Former Australian players Alex Blackwell and Rene Farrell made their last WBBL appearances

Match 54
1 December 2019
14:00
Scorecard

Sydney Sixers; 7/177 (20 overs)	v	Adelaide Strikers; 7/164 (20 overs)
Alyssa Healy 84 (38); Sarah Coyte 2/27 (4 overs)		Sophie Devine 60 (38); Stella Campbell 2/12 (3 overs)

Sydney Sixers won by 13 runs
Hurstville Oval, Sydney
Umpires: Roberto Howard and Marc Nickl
Player of the match: Alyssa Healy (Sydney Sixers)

- Adelaide Strikers won the toss and elected to field
- Broadcast by Cricket Network

Match 55
1 December 2019
15:00
Scorecard

Melbourne Stars; 6/87 (10 overs)	v	Brisbane Heat; 2/88 (8.4 overs)
Elyse Villani 25 (17); Amelia Kerr 2/4 (2 overs)		Beth Mooney 50* (27); Annabel Sutherland 1/14 (2 overs)

Brisbane Heat won by 8 wickets (with 8 balls remaining)
CitiPower Centre, Melbourne
Umpires: Dale Ireland and Greg Azzopardi
Player of the match: Beth Mooney (Brisbane Heat)

- Brisbane Heat won the toss and elected to field
- Match reduced to 10 overs per side due to rain delay
- Broadcast by Cricket Network
- Former Australian player Kristen Beams made her last WBBL appearance

Match 56
1 December 2019
14:00
Scorecard

Perth Scorchers; 4/167 (20 overs)	v	Hobart Hurricanes; 6/132 (20 overs)
Meg Lanning 101 (67); Nicola Carey 2/25 (4 overs)		Heather Knight 36 (36); Taneale Peschel 2/22 (4 overs)

Perth Scorchers won by 35 runs
Lilac Hill Park, Perth
Umpires: Dean Trigg and Ashlee Gibbons
Player of the match: Meg Lanning (Perth Scorchers)

- Hobart Hurricanes won the toss and elected to field
- Broadcast by Cricket Network

== Knockout phase ==
Semifinals
1	Brisbane Heat	6/166
4	Melbourne Renegades	4/163
2	Adelaide Strikers	2/130
3	Perth Scorchers	7/126

Finals
Brisbane Heat	4/162
Adelaide Strikers	7/161

=== Semi-finals ===
Semi-final 1
7 December 2019
10:10
Scorecard

Perth Scorchers; 7/126 (20 overs)	v	Adelaide Strikers; 2/130 (18.1 overs)
Georgia Redmayne 51 (42); Megan Schutt 2/14 (4 overs)		Sophie Devine 65* (46); Kim Garth 1/33 (4 overs)

Adelaide Strikers won by 8 wickets (with 11 balls remaining)
Allan Border Field, Brisbane
Umpires: Darren Close and Simon Lightbody
Player of the match: Sophie Devine (Adelaide Strikers)

- Adelaide Strikers won the toss and elected to field
- Broadcast by Seven Network and Fox Cricket

Semi-final 2
7 December 2019
13:50
Scorecard

Melbourne Renegades; 4/163 (20 overs)	v	Brisbane Heat; 6/166 (18 overs)
Josephine Dooley 50* (42); Jess Jonassen 1/25 (4 overs)		Maddy Green 46 (29); Molly Strano 4/28 (4 overs)

Brisbane Heat won by 4 wickets (with 12 balls remaining)
Allan Border Field, Brisbane
Attendance: 2,031
Umpires: Claire Polosak and Ben Treloar
Player of the match: Jess Jonassen (Brisbane Heat)

- Brisbane Heat won the toss and elected to field
- Broadcast by Seven Network and Fox Cricket

In the first-ever semi-final encounter between the two teams, the Renegades batted first and were slow out of the blocks to be down 2/59 in the ninth over. An ensuing 80-run partnership from 58 balls between Josie Dooley and Jess Duffin ended when the latter was stumped by Beth Mooney off the bowling of Jess Jonassen. A quickfire cameo of 22 off 8 by Georgia Wareham finished the innings promisingly while Dooley, having won a championship with the Brisbane Heat in the previous season, top-scored for the Renegades with 50 not out. The Heat top-order batters of Maddy Green, Jess Jonassen and Grace Harris then "produced fireworks," collectively scoring 126 runs while only facing 79 balls. Molly Strano picked up wickets throughout the second innings, although Brisbane only required 15 runs with 27 balls remaining by the time she claimed her (and the Renegades') fourth. Despite a mini-collapse late in the chase, the Heat hauled in the target of 164 with a comfortable buffer of twelve balls to spare, knocking the Renegades out of the tournament.

=== Final ===
8 December 2019
13:40
Scorecard

Adelaide Strikers; 7/161 (20 overs)	v	Brisbane Heat; 4/162 (18.1 overs)
Amanda-Jade Wellington 55 (33); Jess Jonassen 2/30 (4 overs)		Beth Mooney 56* (45); Tahlia McGrath 2/34 (4 overs)

Brisbane Heat won by 6 wickets (with 11 balls remaining)
Allan Border Field, Brisbane
Attendance: 2,700
Umpires: Claire Polosak and Ben Treloar
Player of the match: Beth Mooney (Brisbane Heat)

- Brisbane Heat won the toss and elected to field
- Broadcast by Seven Network and Fox Cricket
- Brisbane Heat won their second WBBL title

The Heat gained early ascendancy through quick bowler Georgia Prestwidge, who dismissed Player of the Tournament Sophie Devine for just five. A "superb" knock of 55 runs from 33 balls by Amanda-Jade Wellington helped the Strikers to recover to a competitive score of 7/161. The match swung heavily toward Brisbane's favour in the fifth over of the run chase when Sammy-Jo Johnson hit four sixes against the bowling of Devine, though Johnson would be out caught-and-bowled on the last ball of the over. When Devine returned to bowl the eleventh over of the innings, Heat batter Jess Jonassen was dropped by Wellington at extra cover. Jonassen then scored a boundary from each of the next three deliveries she faced, taking Brisbane's required scoring rate down to less than a run a ball. The Heat went on to win with six wickets in hand and eleven balls remaining, claiming their second consecutive championship. For her contribution of 56 not out, Beth Mooney was named Player of the Final.

== Statistics ==
=== Highest totals ===
Team	Score	Against	Venue	Date
Sydney Sixers	0/199 (20 overs)	Melbourne Stars	WACA Ground	3 November 2019
Sydney Sixers	6/192 (20 overs)	Sydney Thunder	North Sydney Oval	18 October 2019
Melbourne Renegades	4/185 (19 overs)	Brisbane Heat	Allan Border Field	27 November 2019
Brisbane Heat	4/183 (20 overs)	Melbourne Renegades	Allan Border Field	27 November 2019
Sydney Sixers	7/177 (20 overs)	Adelaide Strikers	Hurstville Oval	1 December 2019

- Source: CricInfo

=== Most runs ===
Player	Team	Runs
Sophie Devine	Adelaide Strikers	769
Beth Mooney	Brisbane Heat	743
Jess Duffin	Melbourne Renegades	544
Meg Lanning	Perth Scorchers	531
Lizelle Lee	Melbourne Stars	475

- Source: CricInfo

=== Most wickets ===
Player	Team	Wickets
Molly Strano	Melbourne Renegades	24
Jess Jonassen	Brisbane Heat	22
Belinda Vakarewa	Hobart Hurricanes	20
Sophie Devine	Adelaide Strikers	19
Sarah Coyte	Adelaide Strikers	19

- Source: CricInfo

== Awards ==
=== Player of the tournament ===
Player of the Tournament votes are awarded on a 3-2-1 basis by the two standing umpires at the conclusion of every match, meaning a player can receive a maximum of six votes per game.

Pos.	Player	Team	Votes
1st	Sophie Devine	Adelaide Strikers	48
2nd	Beth Mooney	Brisbane Heat	35
3rd	Danielle Wyatt	Melbourne Renegades	33
=4th	Jess Duffin	Melbourne Renegades	31
=4th	Meg Lanning	Perth Scorchers	31
=4th	Ellyse Perry	Sydney Sixers	31
5th	Jess Jonassen	Brisbane Heat	27

Source: WBBL|05 Player of the Tournament

=== Team of the tournament ===
Cricket Australia appointed a panel of experts to select a Team of the Tournament that recognises the standout performers of WBBL|05. The team is intended to mimic regular conditions such as a maximum of three overseas players, a realistic mix of batters and bowlers, as well as a captain and a wicket-keeper.

The members of the selection panel were cricket.com.au journalist Laura Jolly, Head of Big Bash Leagues Alistair Dobson, Australian women's cricket team head coach Matthew Mott, former Australian captain Belinda Clark, former players Lisa Sthalekar (Seven Network) and Mel Jones (Fox Cricket) and ABC commentator Alister Nicholson.

- Sophie Devine (Adelaide Strikers)
- Beth Mooney (Brisbane Heat) – wicket-keeper
- Danielle Wyatt (Melbourne Renegades)
- Meg Lanning (Perth Scorchers)
- Ellyse Perry (Sydney Sixers)
- Jess Duffin (Melbourne Renegades) – captain
- Jess Jonassen (Brisbane Heat)
- Marizanne Kapp (Sydney Sixers)
- Molly Strano (Melbourne Renegades)
- Megan Schutt (Adelaide Strikers)
- Belinda Vakarewa (Hobart Hurricanes)
- Ashley Noffke (Brisbane Heat) – coach

Source: WBBL|05 Team of the Tournament

=== Young gun award ===
Players under 21 years of age at the start of the season are eligible for the Young Gun Award. Weekly winners are selected over the course of the season by a panel of Cricket Australia officials based on match performance, on-field and off-field attitude, and their demonstration of skill, tenacity and good sportsmanship. Each weekly winner receives a $500 Rebel gift card and the overall winner receives a $5000 cash prize, as well as access to a learning and mentor program.

The nominees for the WBBL|05 Young Gun were:

- Week 1: Phoebe Litchfield (Sydney Thunder)
- Week 2: Tayla Vlaeminck (Hobart Hurricanes)
- Week 3: Hannah Darlington (Sydney Thunder) – winner
- Week 4: Tahlia Wilson (Sydney Thunder)
- Week 5: Courtney Webb (Melbourne Renegades)
- Week 6: Annabel Sutherland (Melbourne Stars)
- Week 7: Stella Campbell (Sydney Sixers)

Sydney Thunder medium-pacer Hannah Darlington took out the overall award on the back of a standout debut season in which she claimed 16 wickets at an average of 21.31 and economy rate of 6.82.

=== Most valuable players ===
Each team designated an award to adjudge and recognise their most outstanding contributor for the season.

- Adelaide Strikers Most Valuable Player: Sophie Devine
- Brisbane Heat Most Valuable Player: Jess Jonassen
- Hobart Hurricanes Player of the Tournament: Belinda Vakarewa
- Melbourne Renegades Player of the Season: Jess Duffin
- Melbourne Stars Player of the Season: Lizelle Lee
- Perth Scorchers Player of the Year: Nat Sciver
- Sydney Sixers Player of the Tournament: Marizanne Kapp
- Sydney Thunder Alex Blackwell Medal: Hannah Darlington

== Audience ==
A total of 23 matches are to be televised on free-to-air by the Seven Network, and simulcast on Fox Cricket in the fifth season of the Women's Big Bash. The remaining 36 matches will be live streamed on the Cricket Australia website. All 59 matches are available to watch live or on demand via the streaming service Kayo Sports.

Below are the television ratings for every game that was broadcast on television during the season.

Match No.	Teams	Average TV Ratings				
Match No.	Teams	Seven Network				Fox Cricket
Match No.	Teams	National		5 metro cities		Subscription
Match No.	Teams	Session 1	Session 2	Session 1	Session 2	Session 1 & 2
1	Sydney Sixers vs Sydney Thunder	375,000	325,000	230,000	186,000	43,000
4	Sydney Sixers vs Brisbane Heat	163,000	178,000	89,000	105,000	28,000
6	Sydney Thunder vs Brisbane Heat			86,000	125,000	32,000
9	Adelaide Strikers vs Hobart Hurricanes					15,000
10	Brisbane Heat vs Perth Scorchers	123,000	98,000	69,000	52,000	23,000
13	Perth Scorchers vs Adelaide Strikers					
14	Brisbane Heat vs Hobart Hurricanes					
16	Perth Scorchers vs Melbourne Renegades					5,000 & 40,000
18	Melbourne Renegades vs Sydney Sixers					30,000
19	Perth Scorchers vs Melbourne Stars	123,000	140,000	70,000	82,000	25,000
21	Sydney Sixers vs Melbourne Stars	263,000		164,000		
25	Adelaide Strikers vs Perth Scorchers	108,000	114,000	63,000	67,000	32,000
29	Adelaide Strikers vs Melbourne Stars					
33	Sydney Thunder vs Sydney Sixers	138,000	158,000	83,000	91,000	27,000
34	Sydney Thunder vs Brisbane Heat	175,000	209,000	97,000	122,000	27,000
36	Sydney Sixers vs Melbourne Renegades				137,000	33,000
42	Hobart Hurricanes vs Brisbane Heat					39,000
45	Hobart Hurricanes vs Adelaide Strikers	167,000	174,000	104,000	111,000	40,000
50	Melbourne Stars vs Melbourne Renegades					17,000
53	Melbourne Renegades vs Sydney Thunder					
Semi-final 1	Adelaide Strikers vs Perth Scorchers			89,000	103,000	37,000
Semi-final 2	Brisbane Heat vs Melbourne Renegades			123,000	148,000	60,000
Final	Brisbane Heat vs Adelaide Strikers			162,000	205,000	94,000

== See also ==
- 2019–20 Big Bash League season
