= Lucy Cripps =

Australian cricketer (born 2001)

Personal information
- Full name: Lucy Paige Cripps
- Born: 6 December 2001 (age 24); Frankston, Victoria, Australia
- Batting: Right-handed
- Bowling: Right-arm medium
- Role: All-rounder

Domestic team information
- Years: Team
- 2018/19–2022/23: Victoria
- 2019/20–2022/23: Melbourne Stars

Career statistics
Competition	WLA	WT20
Matches	4	3
Runs scored	75	–
Batting average	25.00	–
100s/50s	0/0	–
Top score	31*	–
Balls bowled	12	–
Wickets	2	–
Bowling average	12.50	–
5 wickets in innings	0	–
10 wickets in match	0	–
Best bowling	2/25	–
Catches/stumpings	0/–	0/–
- Source: CricketArchive, 31 March 2021

Lucy Paige Cripps (born 6 December 2001) is an Australian cricketer who has played for Victoria and Melbourne Stars. An all-rounder, she bats right-handed and bowls right-arm medium pace. She played in one match for the Stars in the 2020–21 WBBL season and three matches for Victoria in the 2020–21 WNCL season.
