= Belinda Vakarewa =

Australian cricketer

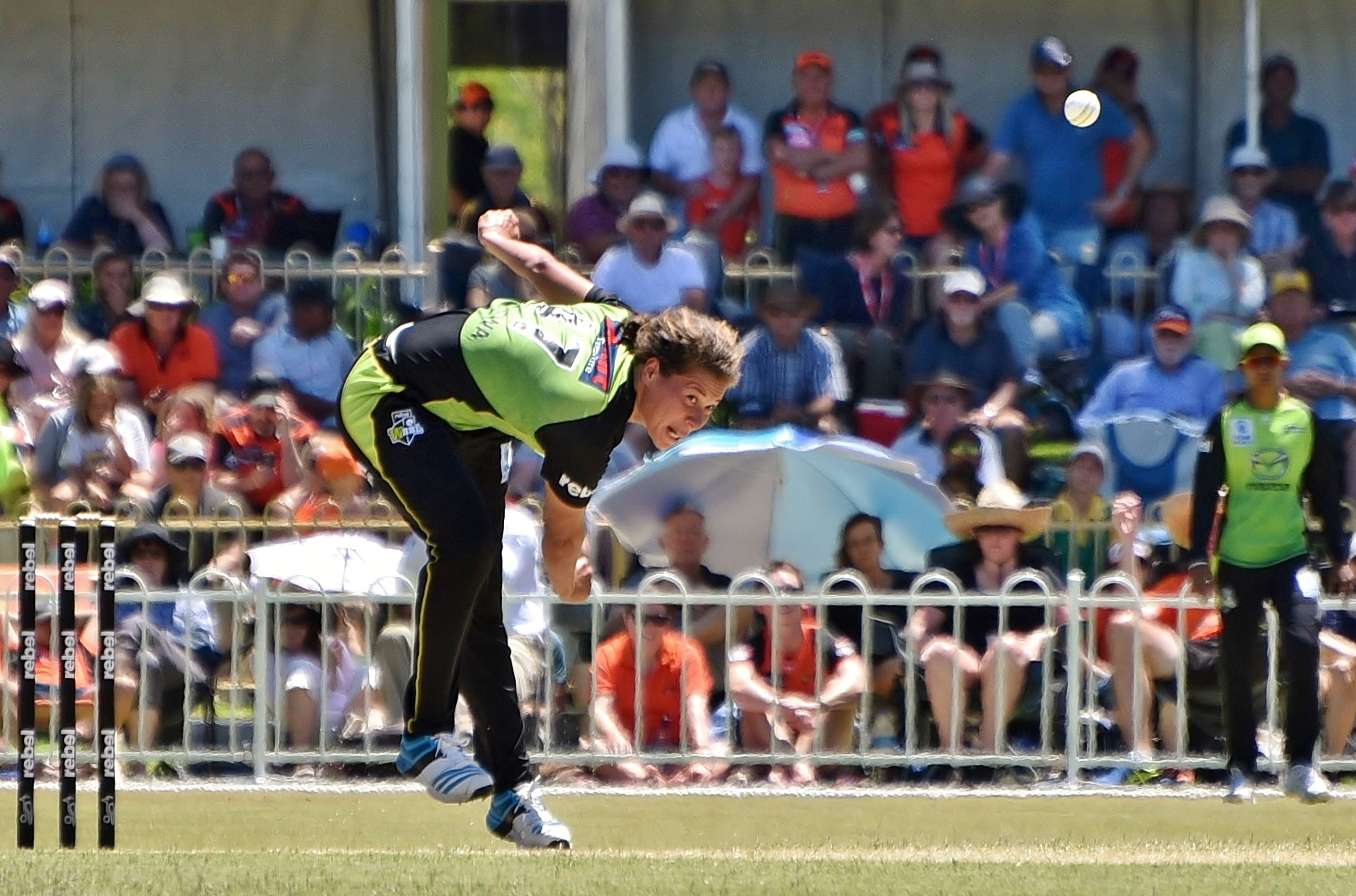
- Vakarewa bowling for Sydney Thunder

Personal information
- Full name: Belinda Waimakare Vakarewa
- Born: 22 January 1998 (age 28); Griffith, New South Wales, Australia
- Batting: Right-handed
- Bowling: Right-arm fast medium
- Role: Bowler

International information
- National side: Australia (2017)
- Only ODI (cap 135): 29 June 2017 v Sri Lanka

Domestic team information
- Years: Team
- 2015/16–2018/19: Sydney Thunder
- 2016/17–2018/19: New South Wales
- 2019/20–2021/22: Hobart Hurricanes
- 2019/20–2021/22: Tasmania
- 2022/23: Sydney Thunder

Career statistics
Competition	WODI
Matches	1
Runs scored	–
Batting average	–
100s/50s	-/-
Top score	–
Balls bowled	24
Wickets	0
Bowling average	–
5 wickets in innings	0
10 wickets in match	0
Best bowling	–
Catches/stumpings	1/–
- Source: ESPNcricinfo, 21 August 2020

Belinda Waimakare Vakarewa (born 22 January 1998) is an Australian cricketer from Griffith, New South Wales. She plays as a fast bowler. Vakarewa has made one international appearance for the national women's team.

== Early life ==
Vakarewa attended Eagle Vale High School. She played local cricket for several clubs in western Sydney, including Campbelltown-Camden in grade cricket as well as Campbelltown City and Magpies Cricket Club at junior level. Her introduction to the sport occurred at the age of ten after participating in a "come and try" day with her brother while in primary school. Vakarewa is from "a very traditional Fijian family" and played her father's choice of sport, rugby, throughout her childhood.

== Domestic career ==
Vakarewa joined the Sydney Thunder ahead of its inaugural season and went on to play in the WBBL|01 championship final, which the team won by three wickets. She was also added to New South Wales' squad during the 2015–16 WNCL season.

In May 2019, Vakarewa signed with the Tasmanian Tigers and Hobart Hurricanes. She enjoyed a breakout WBBL|05 campaign, taking 20 wickets (ranked third in the league) at an average of 15.80. Her outstanding season was recognised with selection in the Team of the Tournament as well as earning the Hurricanes' Most Valuable Player award.

Vakarewa re-signed with the Hurricanes in July 2020, turning down offers from several other teams.

== International career ==
In May 2017, Vakarewa was named in the 15-player Australian squad for the 2017 Women's Cricket World Cup and made her Women's One Day International (WODI) debut during the tournament against Sri Lanka on 29 June. She toured India with the Australian team in March 2018 but spent the series stricken by food poisoning and did not play a match.

In April 2019, Cricket Australia awarded Vakarewa with a contract for the National Performance Squad ahead of the 2019–20 season. She toured the United Kingdom in June and July 2019 as a member of the Australia A squad that played a series of limited overs and red ball matches against the England and England Academy teams.

Vakarewa was included in the Australia A squad that hosted a series of three ODIs and three T20Is against India A in December 2019. Despite a strong display of recent form, she missed out on selection for Australia's 2020 ICC T20 World Cup squad. National team selector Shawn Flegler claimed the decision "illustrates the depth of Australian cricket" and that she was one of several players who "could come into the side at any stage and play a role". Vakarewa was then selected to play for the Governor General's XI in an exhibition match against India at Drummoyne Oval on 28 January 2020.
