= Anna Lanning =

Australian cricketer (born 1994)

Personal information
- Full name: Anna Jane Lanning
- Born: 25 March 1994 (age 32); Wahroonga, New South Wales, Australia
- Batting: Right-handed
- Bowling: Right-arm medium
- Role: Batter
- Relatives: Meg Lanning (sister)

Domestic team information
- Years: Team
- 2010/11–2017/18: Victoria
- 2015/16–2017/18: Melbourne Stars
- 2016: Warwickshire
- 2018/19–2019/20: Australian Capital Territory
- 2018/19–2019/20: Melbourne Renegades
- 2020/21–2021/22: Victoria
- 2020/21–2021/22: Melbourne Stars

Career statistics
Competition	WLA	WT20
Matches	44	68
Runs scored	371	604
Batting average	10.91	16.77
100s/50s	0/1	0/2
Top score	54	83*
Balls bowled	18	34
Wickets	1	0
Bowling average	8.00	–
5 wickets in innings	0	0
10 wickets in match	0	0
Best bowling	1/8	0/3
Catches/stumpings	10/–	18/–
- Source: CricketArchive, 29 March 2021

Anna Jane Lanning (born 25 March 1994) is an Australian cricketer who plays as a right-handed batter and occasional right-arm medium pace bowler. She has played for Warwickshire, the ACT Meteors, the Melbourne Renegades, Victoria and the Melbourne Stars. She plays club cricket for Box Hill.

Lanning is the younger sister of Australian cricket captain Meg Lanning.

Lanning scored 73 in a player of the match performance on debut for the Renegades in the 2019–20 WBBL season.
