= Erin Fazackerley =

Australian cricketer

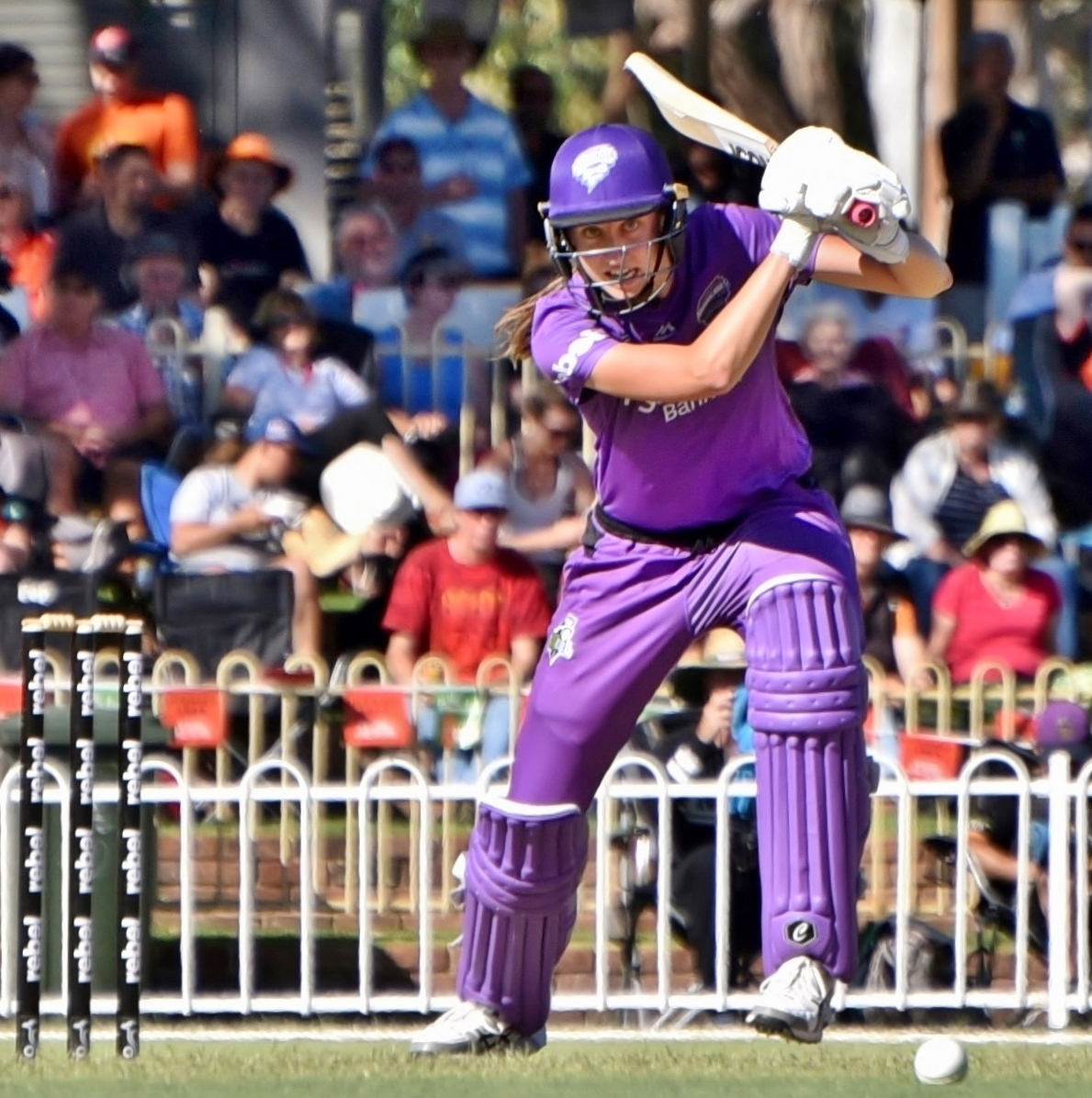
- Fazackerley hits out for the Hobart Hurricanes

Personal information
- Full name: Erin Grace Fazackerley
- Born: 3 July 1998 (age 28)
- Batting: Right-handed
- Bowling: Right-arm fast
- Role: All-rounder

Domestic team information
- Years: Team
- 2016/17–2019/20: Hobart Hurricanes
- 2017/18–2019/20: Tasmania
- 2020/21: Melbourne Renegades

Career statistics
Competition	WLA	WT20
Matches	9	36
Runs scored	151	489
Batting average	–	–
100s/50s	0/0	0/2
Top score	41	58
Balls bowled	192	132
Wickets	3	4
Bowling average	56.00	48.00
5 wickets in innings	0	0
10 wickets in match	0	0
Best bowling	1/20	1/7
Catches/stumpings	1/–	1/–
- Source: Cricinfo, 10 August 2018

Erin Grace Fazackerley (born 3 July 1998) is an Australian cricketer who plays for the Hobart Hurricanes, Tasmania and Melbourne Renegades as an all-rounder with a primary focus on fast bowling. She joined the Hurricanes squad during WBBL|02 (2016–2017), and the Tigers squad the following season.

Fazackerley is more than 180 cm (5 ft 11 in) tall and very athletic. Her ability to bounce the ball while bowling is a major asset. She has also played tennis and netball at a high level, and tried soccer as a child, but ended up specialising in cricket as she really loved the game and it gave her better opportunities.

In November 2017, Fazackerley played for a Governor-General's XI in a one-off T20 tour match against England. Her two wickets for 13 runs was the best performance by the Governor-General's bowlers.

Fazackerley's aunt, Kim Fazackerley, was the first Tasmanian woman to represent Australia in cricket. She played three Tests and nine ODIs between 1992 and 1996, before Fazackerley was born, and in recent years has done some bowling training with her.

In November 2018, she was named in the Hobart Hurricanes' squad for the 2018–19 Women's Big Bash League season.
