= Maisy Gibson =

Australian cricketer (born 1996)

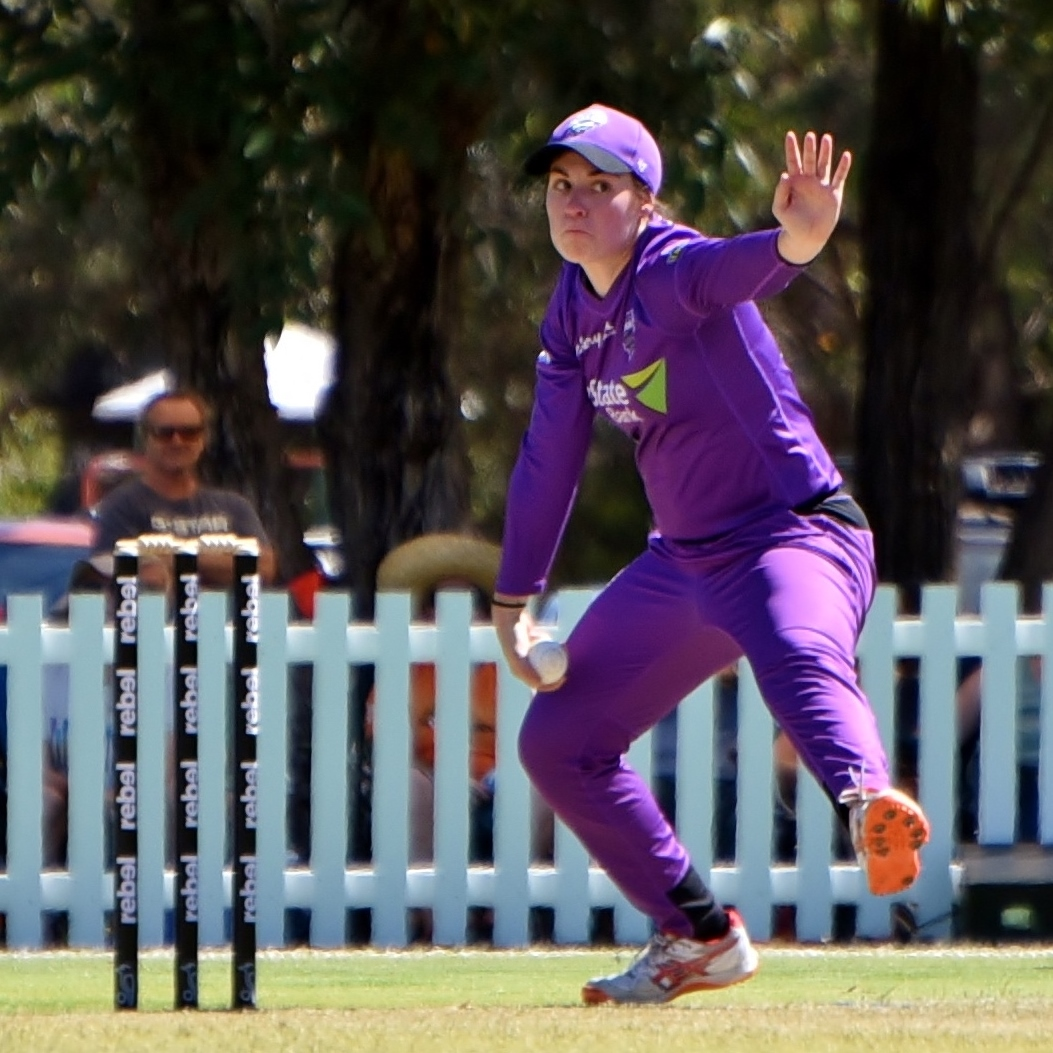
- Gibson bowling for Hobart Hurricanes, 2019

Personal information
- Full name: Maisy Leigh Gibson
- Born: 14 September 1996 (age 30); Singleton, New South Wales, Australia
- Batting: Left-handed
- Bowling: Right arm leg break
- Role: All-rounder

Domestic team information
- Years: Team
- 2015/16–2018/19: New South Wales
- 2015/16–2018/19: Sydney Thunder
- 2016: Nottinghamshire
- 2019/20–present: Tasmania
- 2019/20–present: Hobart Hurricanes

Career statistics
Competition	WLA	WT20
Matches	51	79
Runs scored	298	124
Batting average	25.22	9.00
100s/50s	0/1	0/0
Top score	57*	22*
Balls bowled	2,226	1,412
Wickets	60	75
Bowling average	28.22	21.20
5 wickets in innings	1	0
10 wickets in match	0	0
Best bowling	5/19	4/24
Catches/stumpings	6/–	15/–
- Source: CricketArchive, 21 March 2021

Maisy Leigh Gibson is an Australian cricketer, who plays as a left-handed batter and right-arm leg break bowler for Tasmania and Melbourne Stars. She has previously played for Hobart Hurricanes and New South Wales.

== Career ==
In 2010, she was the first female to captain a team at the Lismore under-12 cricket carnival when she captained Hunter Valley under-12s. Gibson has played Sydney grade level cricket for Singleton, and Hunter Region.

Gibson played in four Women's Big Bash League seasons for Sydney Thunder, taking 36 wickets in total. She was part of the Sydney Thunder (WBBL) team that won the 2015–16 Women's Big Bash League season. She took 13 wickets in the tournament at an average of 11.30 and an economy rate of 5.60. In 2016, she was given a professional New South Wales Breakers contract, which allowed her to move to Sydney. She was later named in the squad for the final of the 2016–17 Women's National Cricket League season.

Ahead of the 2019–20 Women's National Cricket League season and 2019–20 Women's Big Bash League season, she moved to Tasmania, and signed for the Tasmanian Tigers and the Hobart Hurricanes. She took 10 wickets in the 2019–20 WNCL, and in May 2020, she was named Tasmanian women's player of the season.
