= Samantha Betts =

Australian cricketer

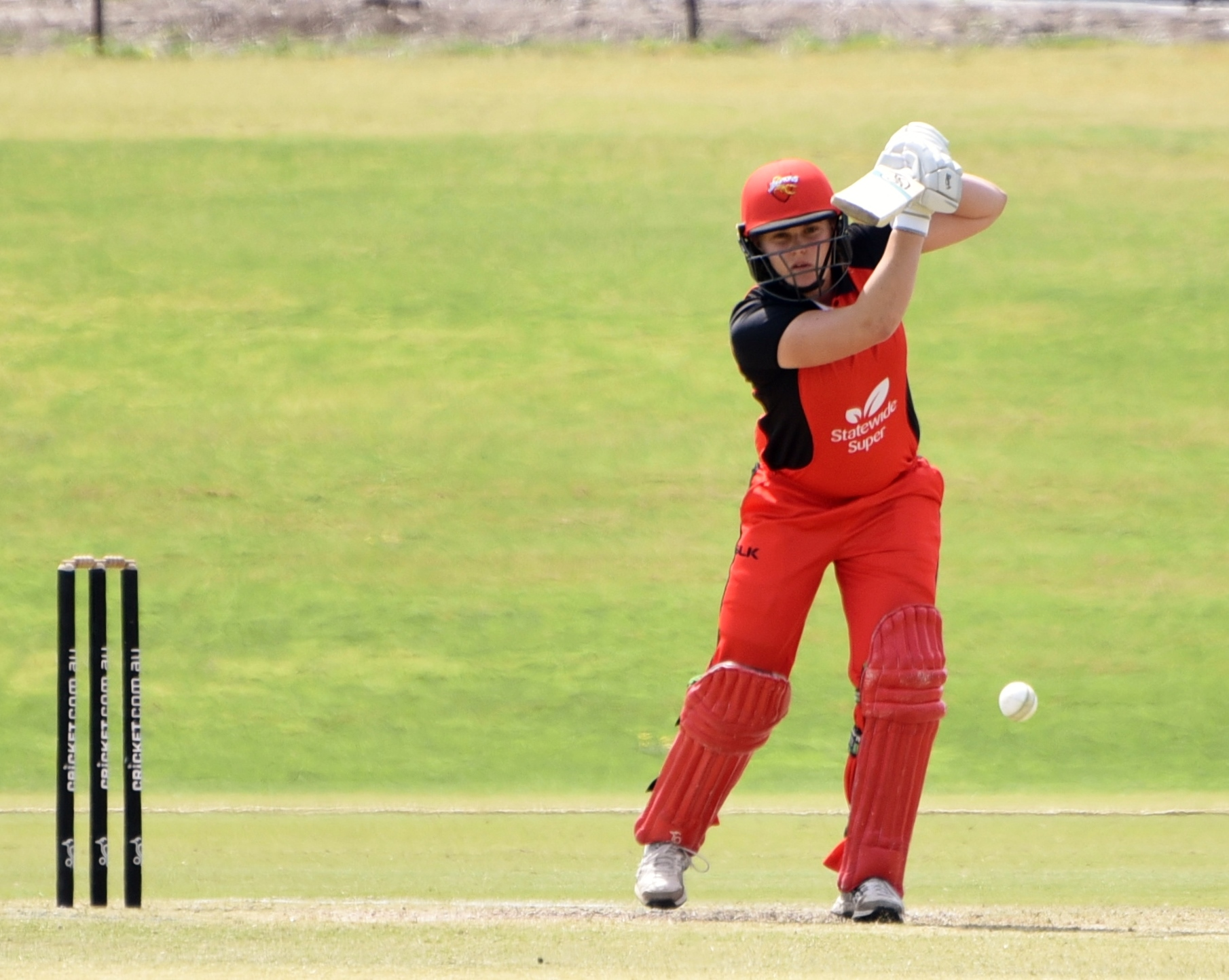
- Betts batting for SA Scorpions, 2018

Personal information
- Full name: Samantha Marie Betts
- Born: 16 February 1996 (age 30); Orroroo, South Australia
- Batting: Right-handed
- Bowling: Right-arm medium
- Role: Bowler

Domestic team information
- Years: Team
- 2012/13–present: South Australia (squad no. 14)
- 2015/16–2018/19: Adelaide Strikers (squad no. 14)
- 2016: Hampshire
- 2019: Hampshire
- 2019/20–2021/22: Perth Scorchers

Career statistics
Competition	WLA	WT20
Matches	69	52
Runs scored	323	63
Batting average	9.50	10.52
100s/50s	0/1	0/0
Top score	59	14
Balls bowled	2,636	577
Wickets	74	28
Bowling average	29.05	26.89
5 wickets in innings	2	0
10 wickets in match	0	0
Best bowling	5/46	3/21
Catches/stumpings	18/–	14/–
- Source: CricketArchive, 18 February 2024

Samantha Marie Betts (born 6 February 1996) is an Australian cricketer who plays for South Australia.

A native of Broken Hill, New South Wales, Betts won selection on the Scorpions' rookie list as a 17-year old schoolgirl for the 2012–13 season, after being spotted by former Australian international player Shelley Nitschke. She had previously done "a fair bit of training and stuff with the guys at the West Broken Hill Cricket Club", and had played in a women's competition in Adelaide.

As a Scorpions rookie, Betts continued to live and attend school in Broken Hill, while travelling to Adelaide once each week to train with the Scorpions.

After making her Scorpions debut during the 2012–13 season, Betts steadily improved to become a mainstay bowler in the Scorpions squad, providing support for the team's strike bowler Megan Schutt. She also worked heavily on her batting. In the 2015–16 Women's National Cricket League competition, her best Scorpions bowling performance was 3/39 against Victorian Spirit.

Betts was a member of the Adelaide Strikers' squad from its inaugural WBBL01 season (2015–16) until 2019. In 2016, she was awarded the Adam Gilchrist Cricket Scholarship to travel to the UK and represent Hampshire. The Scholarship, funded by the Lord's Taverners, is presented to the best female cricketer in Australia who is 21 or younger and grew up in rural Australia.
