= Madeline Penna =

Australian cricketer (born 2000)

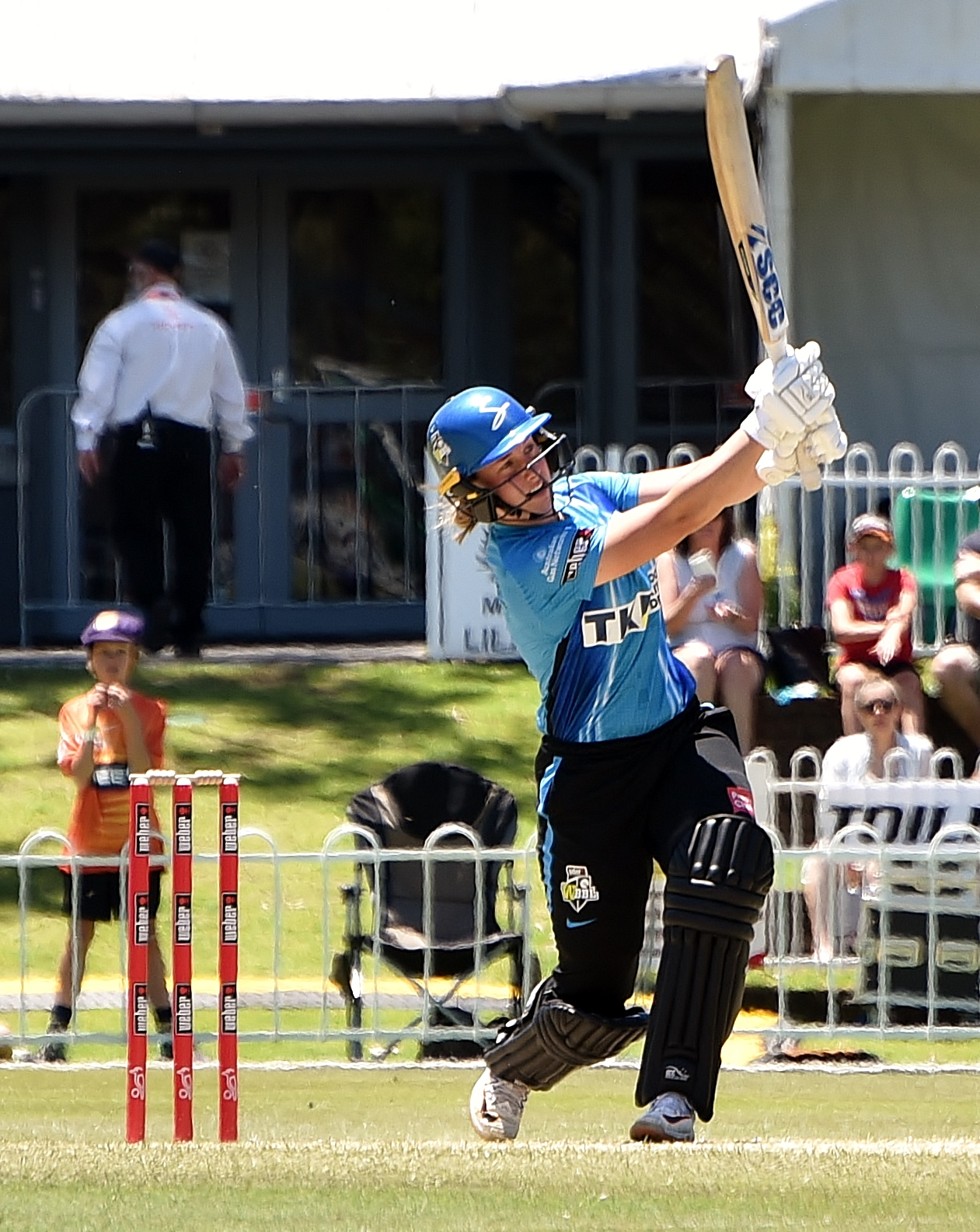
- Penna batting for Adelaide Strikers during WBBL|08

Personal information
- Full name: Madeline Marie Penna
- Born: 30 August 2000 (age 26); Bankstown, New South Wales, Australia
- Batting: Right-handed
- Bowling: Right-arm leg break
- Role: All-rounder

Domestic team information
- Years: Team
- 2019/20–2021/22: Australian Capital Territory (squad no. 11)
- 2019/20: Melbourne Stars (squad no. 11)
- 2020/21–present: Adelaide Strikers (squad no. 11)
- 2022/23–present: South Australia (squad no. 11)
- 2023/24: Canterbury (squad no. 22)
- 2025: Essex

Career statistics
Competition	WLA	WT20
Matches	43	74
Runs scored	1,061	990
Batting average	29.47	29.11
100s/50s	2/3	1/4
Top score	118*	113
Balls bowled	705	253
Wickets	14	16
Bowling average	44.14	21.18
5 wickets in innings	0	0
10 wickets in match	0	0
Best bowling	3/38	4/20
Catches/stumpings	21/–	24/–
- Source: CricketArchive, 20 October 2024

Madeline Marie Penna (born 30 August 2000) is an Australian cricketer who plays for South Australia in the Women's National Cricket League (WNCL) and the Adelaide Strikers in the Women's Big Bash League (WBBL). An all-rounder, she bowls right-arm leg spin and bats right-handed.

== Early life ==
Penna was born on 30 August 2000. When she was nine, she was diagnosed with osteochondritis dissecans, which is effectively loose bone under her kneecap.

== Cricket career ==
Penna made her WNCL debut for the ACT Meteors on 22 September 2019 against Victoria. She scored 14 runs and took one wicket for 24 from seven overs. Two days before the beginning of the 2019–20 WBBL, Penna had not been selected for any of the teams, but due to an injury to Alana King, the Melbourne Stars offered her a position in their squad. She went wicketless on debut but took four for 20 in her second match, against Sydney Thunder.

Penna joined the Adelaide Strikers for the 2020–21 WBBL. In the final week of the tournament she struck a "whirlwind" half-century against the Hobart Hurricanes, the first by a number seven in WBBL history, scoring 56 from 33 balls including 24 runs off a single over. In the 2020–21 WNCL, Penna made her maiden one-day century, scoring 118 from 100 deliveries to help the ACT Meteors to a 64-run win over Western Australia.

On 15 October 2024, Penna scored her maiden Twenty20 century against the Melbourne Renegades in the 2024 T20 Spring Challenge.
