= 2025–26 Women's National Cricket League season =

Cricket tournament

Women's National Cricket League 2025–26 season
- Dates: 24 September 2025 – 21 March 2026
- Administrator: Cricket Australia
- Cricket format: 50-over Limited overs cricket
- Tournament format(s): Double round-robin and final
- Champions: Queensland (2nd title)
- Participants: 7
- Matches: 43
- Most runs: Katie Mack (NSW) (659)
- Most wickets: Lauren Cheatle (NSW) (29)
- Official website: cricket.com.au

The 2025–26 Women's National Cricket League season was the 30th season of the Women's National Cricket League, the women's domestic limited overs cricket competition in Australia. The tournament ran from 24 September 2025 to 21 March 2026. Seven teams competed in a double round-robin tournament.

Queensland won their 2nd title by defeating New South Wales in the rain-hit final by 7 runs.

== Ladder ==
Pos	Team	Pld	W	L	T	MA	Pts	NRR	Qualification
1	New South Wales	12	11	1	0	0	49	1.034	Advanced to the final
2	Queensland	12	8	4	0	0	36	0.459	Advanced to the final
3	Western Australia	12	7	5	0	0	31	0.137	
4	South Australia	12	7	4	0	1	31	−0.220	
5	Australian Capital Territory	12	5	6	0	1	23	−0.217	
6	Tasmania	12	3	9	0	0	15	0.002	
7	Victoria	12	0	12	0	0	−1	−1.267	

Source: ESPNcricinfo
Rules for classification: The top two ranked teams will qualify for the final.
- Point system: 4 for a win, 2 each for a tie/no result/abandoned match, 0 for a loss
- Bonus point system: 1 for a win with a run rate 1.25 times that of the opposition

== Fixtures ==
24 September 2025
14:00 (D/N)
Scorecard

Queensland; 236 (49 overs)	v	Western Australia (home team); 172 (40.5 overs)
Charli Knott 53 (72); Amy Edgar 4/37 (9 overs)		Chloe Piparo 63 (70); Sianna Ginger 2/12 (7 overs)

Queensland won by 64 runs
WACA Ground, Perth
Umpires: Jarryd Buscall and Ahmad Khan
Player of the match: Sianna Ginger (Queensland)

- Western Australia won the toss and elected to field.
- Points: Queensland 5, Western Australia 0

26 September 2025
10:00
Scorecard

(home team) Victoria; 181 (48.1 overs)	v	New South Wales; 7/182 (46.1 overs)
Hasrat Gill 34 (55); Lauren Cheatle 2/24 (9 overs)		Georgia Adams 45* (79); Georgia Prestwidge 2/21 (6 overs)

New South Wales won by 3 wickets
Junction Oval, Melbourne
Umpires: Louise Broadfoot and Bede Sajowitz
Player of the match: Georgia Adams (New South Wales)

- New South Wales won the toss and elected to field.
- Points: New South Wales 4, Victoria -1

26 September 2025
10:00
Scorecard

(home team) South Australia; 5/330 (50 overs)	v	Tasmania; 7/294 (50 overs)
Courtney Webb 123* (94); Kathryn Bryce 3/60 (10 overs)		Lizelle Lee 65 (76); Isabella Malgioglio 2/59 (9 overs)

South Australia won by 36 runs
Karen Rolton Oval, Adelaide
Umpires: Dhaval Bhatt and Peter George
Player of the match: Courtney Webb (South Australia)

- South Australia won the toss and elected to bat.
- Points: South Australia 4, Tasmania 0

26 September 2025
14:00 (D/N)
Scorecard

(home team) Western Australia; 5/272 (50 overs)	v	Queensland; 8/277 (47.2 overs)
Heather Graham 90 (104); Jess Jonassen 2/40 (10 overs)		Annie O'Neil 86* (77); Amy Edgar 3/40 (10 overs)

Queensland won by 2 wickets
WACA Ground, Perth
Umpires: Kate Holloman and Peta Merrilees
Player of the match: Annie O'Neil (Queensland)

- Western Australia won the toss and elected to bat.
- Points: Queensland 4, Western Australia 0

28 September 2025
10:00
Scorecard

New South Wales; 9/266 (50 overs)	v	Victoria (home team); 221 (46.3 overs)
Tahlia Wilson 109 (110); Sophie Day 3/48 (10 overs)		Sasha Moloney 56* (60); Sarah Coyte 3/31 (10 overs)

New South Wales won by 45 runs
Junction Oval, Melbourne
Umpires: Chris Grant and Clare Haysom
Player of the match: Tahlia Wilson (New South Wales)

- New South Wales won the toss and elected to bat.
- Points: New South Wales 4, Victoria 0

28 September 2025
10:00
Scorecard

(home team) South Australia; 196 (46.2 overs)	v	Tasmania; 4/197 (35.2 overs)
Ellie Johnston 63 (82); Nicola Carey 4/48 (10 overs)		Rachel Trenaman 75* (92); Amanda-Jade Wellington 3/41 (10 overs)

Tasmania won by 6 wickets
Karen Rolton Oval, Adelaide
Umpires: Peter George and Kurt Miegel
Player of the match: Rachel Trenaman (Tasmania)

- South Australia won the toss and elected to bat.
- Points: Tasmania 5, South Australia 0

8 October 2025
10:00
Scorecard

Tasmania; 2/383 (50 overs)	v	Victoria (home team); 239 (42.1 overs)
Lizelle Lee 187 (141); Sophie Day 2/66 (8 overs)		Nicole Faltum 102 (123); Lauren Smith 3/39 (7 overs)

Tasmania won by 144 runs
Junction Oval, Melbourne
Umpires: Ashfaq Ali and Malcolm Wood
Player of the match: Lizelle Lee (Tasmania)

- Victoria won the toss and elected to field.
- Points: Tasmania 5, Victoria 0

9 October 2025
10:00
Scorecard

(home team) New South Wales; 5/298 (50 overs)	v	Western Australia; 8/292 (50 overs)
Anika Learoyd 108 (118); Rebecca McGrath 2/40 (6 overs)		Maddy Darke 73 (87); Lauren Cheatle 2/57 (10 overs)

New South Wales won by 6 runs
Cricket Central, Sydney
Umpires: Mitch Claydon and Lauren McGill
Player of the match: Anika Learoyd (New South Wales)

- New South Wales won the toss and elected to bat.
- Points: New South Wales 4, Western Australia 0

10 October 2025
10:00
Scorecard

Tasmania; 8/245 (50 overs)	v	Victoria (home team); 137 (29.2 overs)
Elyse Villani 59 (67); Sasha Moloney 3/24 (5 overs)		Tess Flintoff 46 (47); Courtney Sippel 2/8 (2.2 overs)

Tasmania won by 108 runs
Junction Oval, Melbourne
Umpires: Louise Broadfoot and Bede Sajowitz
Player of the match: Hayley Silver-Holmes (Tasmania)

- Tasmania won the toss and elected to bat.
- Points: Tasmania 5, Victoria 0

11 October 2025
10:00
Scorecard

(home team) New South Wales; 8/301 (50 overs)	v	Western Australia; 158 (36.4 overs)
Katie Mack 96 (101); Lilly Mills 2/53 (10 overs)		Maddy Darke 75* (89); Samantha Bates 4/26 (10 overs)

New South Wales won by 143 runs
Cricket Central, Sydney
Umpires: Jeff Egan and Patrick Jackson
Player of the match: Samantha Bates (New South Wales)

- New South Wales won the toss and elected to bat.
- Points: New South Wales 5, Western Australia 0

12 October 2025
09:30
Scorecard

Australian Capital Territory; 8/277 (50 overs)	v	Queensland (home team); 8/278 (49.1 overs)
Zoe Cooke 60* (61); Charli Knott 3/54 (10 overs)		Lauren Winfield-Hill 101* (87); Grace Dignam 2/46 (8.1 overs)

Queensland won by 2 wickets
Allan Border Field, Brisbane
Umpires: Riki Wessels (Eng) and Kylie White (Eng)
Player of the match: Lauren Winfield-Hill (Queensland)

- Australian Capital Territory won the toss and elected to bat.
- Points: Queensland 4, Australian Capital Territory 0

14 October 2025
09:30
Scorecard

Australian Capital Territory; 9/252 (50 overs)	v	Queensland (home team); 5/253 (38 overs)
Grace Lyons 94 (94); Nicola Hancock 2/49 (9 overs)		Georgia Redmayne 105* (104); Zoe Cooke 3/47 (8 overs)

Queensland won by 5 wickets
Allan Border Field, Brisbane
Umpires: Nathan James and Trent Pascoe
Player of the match: Georgia Redmayne (Queensland)

- Queensland won the toss and elected to field.
- Points: Queensland 5, Australian Capital Territory 0

4 January 2026
10:30
Scorecard

Queensland; 8/293 (50 overs)	v	Tasmania (home team); 9/261 (50 overs)
Mikayla Wrigley 88 (115); Maisy Gibson 2/42 (10 overs)		Rachel Trenaman 48 (65); Sianna Ginger 3/37 (10 overs)

Queensland won by 32 runs
Bellerive Oval, Hobart
Umpires: Simon Burns and Scolyer
Player of the match: Nicola Hancock (Queensland)

- Tasmania won the toss and elected to field.
- Points: Tasmania 4, Queensland 0

6 January 2026
10:00
Scorecard

Victoria; 161 (36.1 overs)	v	Australian Capital Territory (home team); 6/164 (33.1 overs)
Rhys McKenna 62 (62); Amy Hunter 3/30 (8 overs)		Annie Wikman 62* (58); Tess Flintoff 3/38 (10 overs)

Australian Capital Territory won by 4 wickets
Phillip Oval, Canberra
Umpires: Lachlan Fitzgerald and Patrick Jackson
Player of the match: Annie Wikman (Australian Capital Territory)

- Australian Capital Territory won the toss and elected to field.
- Points: Australian Capital Territory 5, Victoria 0

6 January 2026
10:30
Scorecard

Queensland; 8/287 (50 overs)	v	Tasmania (home team); 227 (44.2 overs)
Georgia Redmayne 125* (134); Maisy Gibson 2/39 (6 overs)		Hayley Silver-Holmes 66 (68); Nicola Hancock 4/42 (10 overs)

Queensland won by 60 runs
Bellerive Oval, Hobart
Umpires: Simon Burns and Scolyer
Player of the match: Georgia Redmayne (Queensland)

- Queensland won the toss and elected to bat.
- Points: Queensland 5, Tasmania 0

8 January 2026
10:00
Scorecard

(home team) Australian Capital Territory; 7/247 (50 overs)	v	Victoria; 199 (41.4 overs)
Annie Wikman 142* (136); Ella Hayward 3/51 (9 overs)		Molly Strano 60 (68); Shivani Mehta 3/35 (8 overs)

Australian Capital Territory won by 48 runs
Phillip Oval, Canberra
Umpires: Patrick Jackson and Andrew Scotford
Player of the match: Annie Wikman (Australian Capital Territory)

- Victoria won the toss and elected to field.
- Points: Australian Capital Territory 4, Victoria 0

8 January 2026
14:00 (D/N)
Scorecard

(home team) Western Australia; 243 (50 overs)	v	South Australia; 191 (38.4 overs)
Mathilda Carmichael 71 (105); Jemma Barsby 3/28 (10 overs)		Courtney Webb 58 (55); Amy Edgar 5/43 (10 overs)

Western Australia won by 52 runs
WACA Ground, Perth
Umpires: Dennis Smallwood and Kate Holloman
Player of the match: Amy Edgar (Western Australia)

- South Australia won the toss and elected to field.
- Points: Western Australia 5, South Australia 0

10 January 2026
14:00 (D/N)
Scorecard

South Australia; 153 (39.2 overs)	v	Western Australia (home team); 2/154 (26.1 overs)
Tahlia McGrath 47 (72); Shay Manolini 4/38 (10 overs)		Heather Graham 46* (40); Amanda-Jade Wellington 1/27 (6 overs)

Western Australia won by 8 wickets
WACA Ground, Perth
Umpires: Dennis Smallwood and Kate Holloman
Player of the match: Shay Manolini (Western Australia)

- South Australia won the toss and elected to bat.
- Points: Western Australia 5, South Australia 0

20 January 2026
10:00
Scorecard

(home team) Australian Capital Territory; 9/221 (50 overs)	v	New South Wales; 2/224 (36.3 overs)
Grace Lyons 55 (58); Lauren Cheatle 3/34 (9 overs)		Alyssa Healy 81* (79); Annie Wikman 1/16 (2.3 overs)

New South Wales won by 8 wickets
Phillip Oval, Canberra
Umpires: Jeff Egan and Syed Humayun
Player of the match: Alyssa Healy (New South Wales)

- New South Wales won the toss and elected to field.
- Points: New South Wales 5, Australian Capital Territory 0

20 January 2026
09:30
Scorecard

(home team) Queensland; 180 (38.5 overs)	v	South Australia; 6/181 (38.3 overs)
Lauren Winfield-Hill 33 (58); Amanda-Jade Wellington 5/42 (8.5 overs)		Emma de Broughe 71 (104); Bonnie Berry 3/32 (7 overs)

South Australia won by 4 wickets
Allan Border Field, Brisbane
Umpires: Trent Pascoe (Aus) and Kylie White (Eng)
Player of the match: Amanda-Jade Wellington (South Australia)

- South Australia won the toss and elected to field.
- Points: South Australia 5, Queensland 0

22 January 2026
10:00
Scorecard

(home team) Australian Capital Territory; 192 (42.4 overs)	v	New South Wales; 2/193 (35 overs)
Georgia Elwiss 66 (78); Maitlan Brown 3/45 (8 overs)		Tahlia Wilson 115* (115); Angelina Genford 1/32 (5 overs)

New South Wales won by 8 wickets
Phillip Oval, Canberra
Umpires: Jeff Egan and Syed Humayun
Player of the match: Tahlia Wilson (New South Wales)

- Australian Capital Territory won the toss and elected to bat.
- Points: New South Wales 5, Australian Capital Territory 0

22 January 2026
09:30
Scorecard

(home team) Queensland; 194 (42 overs)	v	South Australia; 9/195 (43 overs)
Ruby Strange 39* (54); Darcie Brown 5/45 (8 overs)		Courtney Webb 50 (67); Sianna Ginger 4/35 (10 overs)

South Australia won by 1 wicket
Allan Border Field, Brisbane
Umpires: Elsie Bradford and Nathan James
Player of the match: Darcie Brown (South Australia)

- South Australia won the toss and elected to field.
- Points: South Australia 4, Queensland 0

28 January 2026
10:30
Scorecard

(home team) Tasmania; 221 (49.5 overs)	v	Western Australia; 5/222 (41.2 overs)
Courtney Sippel 60 (89); Heather Graham 3/23 (10 overs)		Maddy Darke 98* (113); Hayley Silver-Holmes 3/41 (8 overs)

Western Australia won by 5 wickets
Bellerive Oval, Hobart
Umpires: Muhammad Qureshi and Scolyer
Player of the match: Maddy Darke (Western Australia)

- Tasmania won the toss and elected to bat.
- Points: Western Australia 4, Tasmania 0

30 January 2026
10:30
Scorecard

(home team) Tasmania; 6/273 (50 overs)	v	Western Australia; 4/274 (47.4 overs)
Rachel Trenaman 139* (146); Shay Manolini 2/53 (8 overs)		Chloe Piparo 119 (118); Hayley Silver-Holmes 1/43 (10 overs)

Western Australia won by 6 wickets
Bellerive Oval, Hobart
Umpires: Sam Burns and Simon Burns
Player of the match: Chloe Piparo (Western Australia)

- Tasmania won the toss and elected to bat.
- Points: Western Australia 4, Tasmania 0

3 February 2026
10:00
Scorecard

(home team) New South Wales; 7/309 (50 overs)	v	Queensland; 224 (42.5 overs)
Katie Mack 95 (88); Jess Jonassen 3/58 (10 overs)		Georgia Redmayne 100 (107); Sarah Coyte 3/31 (7 overs)

New South Wales won by 85 runs
Cricket Central, Sydney
Umpires: Lauren McGill and Kate Rowlands
Player of the match: Katie Mack (New South Wales)

- Queensland won the toss and elected to field.
- Points: New South Wales 5, Queensland 0

3 February 2026
10:00
Scorecard

Victoria; 226 (49.2 overs)	v	South Australia (home team); 8/230 (48.5 overs)
Annabel Sutherland 75 (76); Jemma Barsby 3/27 (7 overs)		Tahlia McGrath 58 (79); Annabel Sutherland 3/41 (9.5 overs)

South Australia won by 2 wickets
Karen Rolton Oval, Adelaide
Umpires: Peter George and Kurt Miegel
Player of the match: Tahlia McGrath (South Australia)

- South Australia won the toss and elected to field.
- Points: South Australia 4, Victoria 0

4 February 2026
14:00 (D/N)
Scorecard

(home team) Tasmania; 9/238 (50 overs)	v	Australian Capital Territory; 5/239 (40.4 overs)
Rachel Trenaman 103 (115); Zoe Cooke 4/44 (10 overs)		Olivia Porter 107 (104); Kathryn Bryce 3/34 (10 overs)

Australian Capital Territory won by 5 wickets
Bellerive Oval, Hobart
Umpires: Simon Burns and Muhammad Qureshi
Player of the match: Olivia Porter (Australian Capital Territory)

- Australian Capital Territory won the toss and elected to field.
- Points: Australian Capital Territory 4, Tasmania 0

5 February 2026
10:00
Scorecard

Queensland; 188 (47.4 overs)	v	New South Wales (home team); 9/189 (44.5 overs)
Mikayla Wrigley 46 (99); Lauren Cheatle 4/32 (10 overs)		Maitlan Brown 41 (54); Grace Parsons 3/47 (10 overs)

New South Wales won by 1 wicket
Cricket Central, Sydney
Umpires: Patrick Jackson and Kate Rowlands
Player of the match: Lauren Cheatle (New South Wales)

- Queensland won the toss and elected to bat.
- Points: New South Wales 4, Queensland 0

5 February 2026
10:00
Scorecard

Victoria; 7/285 (50 overs)	v	South Australia (home team); 4/287 (46.2 overs)
Annabel Sutherland 134 (112); Darcie Brown 2/46 (8 overs)		Emma de Broughe 82 (87); Milly Illingworth 1/20 (4 overs)

South Australia won by 6 wickets
Karen Rolton Oval, Adelaide
Umpires: James Cushway and Dhaval Bhatt
Player of the match: Annabel Sutherland (Victoria)

- South Australia won the toss and elected to field.
- Points: South Australia 4, Victoria 0

6 February 2026
14:00 (D/N)
Scorecard

Australian Capital Territory; 9/295 (50 overs)	v	Tasmania (home team); 8/285 (50 overs)
Zoe Cooke 83 (78); Julia Cavanough 4/56 (9 overs)		Emma Manix-Geeves 83 (60); Anesu Mushangwe 3/34 (10 overs)

Australian Capital Territory won by 10 runs
Bellerive Oval, Hobart
Umpires: Simon Burns and Scolyer
Player of the match: Zoe Cooke (Australian Capital Territory)

- Tasmania won the toss and elected to field.
- Points: Australian Capital Territory 4, Tasmania 0

16 February 2026
10:00
Scorecard

(home team) Victoria; 8/250 (50 overs)	v	Western Australia; 4/253 (47.1 overs)
Tess Flintoff 101 (101); Heather Graham 3/51 (10 overs)		Mikayla Hinkley 86 (120); Milly Illingworth 1/30 (5 overs)

Western Australia won by 6 wickets
Jubilee Park, Melbourne
Umpires: Shawn Craig and Clare Haysom
Player of the match: Heather Graham (Western Australia)

- Western Australia won the toss and elected to field.
- Points: Western Australia 4, Victoria 0

18 February 2026
10:00
Scorecard

Western Australia; 6/276 (50 overs)	v	Victoria (home team); 6/272 (50 overs)
Chloe Ainsworth 104* (110); Milly Illingworth 2/38 (8 overs)		Tess Flintoff 72* (54); Bhavisha Devchand 2/27 (5 overs)

Western Australia won by 4 runs
Jubilee Park, Melbourne
Umpires: Ashfaq Ali and Gaurav Bawa
Player of the match: Chloe Ainsworth (Western Australia)

- Victoria won the toss and elected to field.
- Points: Western Australia 4, Victoria 0

21 February 2026
10:00
Scorecard

(home team) New South Wales; 274 (50 overs)	v	Tasmania; 230 (45.4 overs)
Katie Mack 99 (103); Courtney Sippel 3/45 (8 overs)		Emma Manix-Geeves 100 (104); Maitlan Brown 4/30 (7.4 overs)

New South Wales won by 44 runs
Cricket Central, Sydney
Umpires: Mitch Claydon and Patrick Jackson
Player of the match: Katie Mack (New South Wales)

- Tasmania won the toss and elected to field.
- Points: New South Wales 4, Tasmania 0

22 February 2026
10:00
Scorecard

(home team) Australian Capital Territory; 258 (49.3 overs)	v	South Australia; 0/21 (1.3 overs)
Annie Wikman 69 (86); Courtney Neale 3/40 (9 overs)		Ellie Johnston 18* (9)

No result
Phillip Oval, Canberra
Umpires: Suranga Lekamarachchi and Lauren McGill

- South Australia won the toss and elected to field.
- Rain prevented any further play.
- Points: Australian Capital Territory 2, South Australia 2

23 February 2026
10:00
Scorecard

(home team) New South Wales; 8/246 (50 overs)	v	Tasmania; 209 (48 overs)
Sarah Coyte 82* (87); Callie Wilson 3/35 (8 overs)		Rachel Trenaman 56 (69); Lucy Finn 2/23 (7 overs)

New South Wales won by 37 runs
Cricket Central, Sydney
Umpires: Mitch Claydon and Kate Rowlands
Player of the match: Sarah Coyte (New South Wales)

- New South Wales won the toss and elected to bat.
- Points: New South Wales 4, Tasmania 0

24 February 2026
10:00
Scorecard

South Australia; 8/280 (50 overs)	v	Australian Capital Territory (home team); 8/254 (50 overs)
Jemma Barsby 85 (66); Zoe Cooke 4/70 (10 overs)		Grace Lyons 67 (88); Madeline Penna 3/34 (8 overs)

South Australia won by 26 runs
Phillip Oval, Canberra
Umpires: Syed Humayun and Lauren McGill
Player of the match: Jemma Barsby (South Australia)

- South Australia won the toss and elected to bat.
- Points: South Australia 4, Australian Capital Territory 0

12 March 2026
09:30
Scorecard

(home team) Queensland; 6/288 (50 overs)	v	Victoria; 238 (49 overs)
Jess Jonassen 69 (80); Zoe Samuel 3/52 (9 overs)		Rhys McKenna 54 (50); Grace Parsons 5/37 (10 overs)

Queensland won by 50 runs
Allan Border Field, Brisbane
Umpires: Nathan James (Aus) and Kylie White (Eng)
Player of the match: Grace Parsons (Queensland)

- Victoria won the toss and elected to field.
- Points: Queensland 4, Victoria 0

12 March 2026
10:00
Scorecard

New South Wales; 5/259 (50 overs)	v	South Australia (home team); 7/260 (49.3 overs)
Georgia Adams 90 (95); Ella Wilson 1/30 (6 overs)		Courtney Webb 59 (59); Frankie Nicklin 2/23 (6 overs)

South Australia won by 3 wickets
Adelaide Oval, Adelaide
Umpires: Peter George and Eloise Sheridan
Player of the match: Courtney Webb (South Australia)

- New South Wales won the toss and elected to bat.
- Points: South Australia 4, New South Wales 0

13 March 2026
14:00 (D/N)
Scorecard

Australian Capital Territory; 174 (41.1 overs)	v	Western Australia (home team); 2/175 (34.1 overs)
Annie Wikman 78 (89); Lilly Mills 3/42 (10 overs)		Chloe Piparo 82 (105); Shivani Mehta 1/23 (5.1 overs)

Western Australia won by 8 wickets
WACA Ground, Perth
Umpires: Ahmad Khan and Peta Merrilees
Player of the match: Chloe Piparo (Western Australia)

- Australian Capital Territory won the toss and elected to bat.
- Points: Western Australia 5, Australian Capital Territory 0

14 March 2026
09:30
Scorecard

Victoria; 104 (31.2 overs)	v	Queensland (home team); 1/106 (14.5 overs)
Samara Dulvin 20 (46); Charli Knott 3/8 (6 overs)		Jess Jonassen 41* (40); Ella Hayward 1/18 (3 overs)

Queensland won by 9 wickets
Allan Border Field, Brisbane
Umpires: Stephen Dionysius and Riki Wessels
Player of the match: Charli Knott (Queensland)

- Queensland won the toss and elected to field.
- Points: Queensland 5, Victoria 0

14 March 2026
10:00
Scorecard

New South Wales; 190 (48.5 overs)	v	South Australia (home team); 128 (36.3 overs)
Georgia Adams 50 (59); Eleanor Larosa 3/26 (8 overs)		Jemma Barsby 41 (64); Samantha Bates 3/21 (5.3 overs)

New South Wales won by 62 runs
Adelaide Oval, Adelaide
Umpires: Peter George and Eloise Sheridan
Player of the match: Lauren Cheatle (New South Wales)

- South Australia won the toss and elected to field.
- Points: New South Wales 5, South Australia 0

15 March 2026
14:00 (D/N)
Scorecard

Australian Capital Territory; 205 (49.5 overs)	v	Western Australia (home team); 192 (35.3 overs)
Carly Leeson 41 (52); Shay Manolini 3/51 (9.5 overs)		Maddy Darke 42 (32); Zoe Cooke 3/29 (8 overs)

Australian Capital Territory won by 13 runs
WACA Ground, Perth
Umpires: Simon Bussey and Kate Holloman
Player of the match: Carly Leeson (Australian Capital Territory)

- Western Australia won the toss and elected to field.
- Points: Australian Capital Territory 4, Western Australia 0

== Final ==
21 March 2026
10:00
Scorecard

Queensland; 7/332 (50 overs)	v	New South Wales (home team); 6/212 (32 overs)
Grace Harris 111 (94); Lauren Cheatle 3/46 (10 overs)		Tahlia Wilson 76 (82); Jess Jonassen 2/39 (7 overs)

Queensland won by 7 runs (DLS method)
Cricket Central, Sydney
Umpires: Eloise Sheridan and Ben Treloar
Player of the match: Grace Harris (Queensland)

- Queensland won the toss and elected to bat.
- New South Wales were set a revised target of 220 from 32 overs due to rain.
