= 2024–25 Women's National Cricket League season =

Cricket tournament

Women's National Cricket League 2024–25 season
- Dates: 24 September 2024 – 2 March 2025
- Administrator: Cricket Australia
- Cricket format: Limited overs cricket (50 overs)
- Tournament format(s): Double round-robin and final
- Champions: New South Wales (21st title)
- Participants: 7
- Matches: 43
- Most runs: (New South Wales) Tahlia Wilson (667)
- Most wickets: (South Australia) Amanda-Jade Wellington (29)
- Official website: cricket.com.au

The 2024–25 Women's National Cricket League season was the 29th season of the Women's National Cricket League, the women's domestic limited overs cricket competition in Australia. The tournament ran from 24 September 2024 to 2 March 2025. Seven teams are competing in a double round-robin tournament. New South Wales Breakers won the final.

== Points table ==
Pos	Team	Pld	W	L	T	MA	Pts	NRR
1	Queensland	12	8	4	0	0	35.5	0.952
2	New South Wales	12	8	4	0	0	33	0.343
3	Tasmania	12	7	5	0	0	31	0.085
4	South Australia	12	7	5	0	0	30	0.405
5	Victoria	12	6	6	0	0	25	−0.288
6	Australian Capital Territory	12	3	9	0	0	14	−0.863
7	Western Australia	12	3	9	0	0	13	−0.541

Source: ESPNcricinfo
Rules for classification: The top two ranked teams will qualify for the final.
- Point system: 4 for a win, 2 each for a tie/no result/abandoned match, 0 for a loss
- Bonus point system: 1 for a win with a run rate 1.25 times that of the opposition

== Fixtures ==
Match 1
24 September 2024
10:00
Scorecard

Tasmania; 219 (48.5 overs)	v	Western Australia (home team); 167 (42.1 overs)
Tabatha Saville 46 (76); Lilly Mills 5/46 (9.5 overs)		Chloe Ainsworth 40 (54); Lauren Smith 3/39 (7.1 overs)

Tasmania won by 52 runs
WACA Ground, Perth
Umpires: Ashlee Gibbons and Ahmad Khan
Player of the match: Molly Strano (Tasmania)

- Tasmania won the toss and elected to bat.
- Points: Tasmania 5, Western Australia 0

Match 2
26 September 2024
10:00
Scorecard

(home team) Western Australia; 215 (45.3 overs)	v	Tasmania; 9/216 (48.3 overs)
Mikayla Hinkley 62 (84); Nicola Carey 2/21 (5 overs)		Naomi Stalenberg 33 (40); Chloe Ainsworth 4/45 (10 overs)

Tasmania won by 1 wicket
WACA Ground, Perth
Umpires: Jarryd Buscall and Ashlee Gibbons
Player of the match: Chloe Ainsworth (Western Australia)

- Western Australia won the toss and elected to bat.
- Points: Tasmania 4, Western Australia 0

Match 3
27 September 2024
09:30
Scorecard

(home team) Queensland; 9/266 (50 overs)	v	New South Wales; 6/267 (48 overs)
Lauren Winfield-Hill 65 (72); Sammy-Jo Johnson 4/44 (9 overs)		Georgia Adams 63 (79); Sianna Ginger 4/49 (8 overs)

New South Wales won by 4 wickets
Allan Border Field, Brisbane
Umpires: N James and David Taylor
Player of the match: Sammy-Jo Johnson (New South Wales)

- New South Wales won the toss and elected to field.
- Points: New South Wales 4, Queensland 0

Match 4
27 September 2024
10:00
Scorecard

(home team) South Australia; 284 (50 overs)	v	Australian Capital Territory; 187 (38.5 overs)
Jemma Barsby 58 (72); Anesu Mushangwe 3/53 (10 overs)		Zoe Cooke 41* (58); Emma de Broughe 3/2 (1.5 overs)

South Australia won by 97 runs
Karen Rolton Oval, Adelaide
Umpires: Dhaval Bhatt and Peter George
Player of the match: Jemma Barsby (South Australia)

- South Australia won the toss and elected to bat.
- Points: South Australia 5, Australian Capital Territory 0

Match 5
29 September 2024
09:30
Scorecard

(home team) Queensland; 216 (46.3 overs)	v	New South Wales; 8/217 (46.3 overs)
Jess Jonassen 89 (83); Sarah Coyte 3/37 (10 overs)		Tahlia Wilson 97 (112); Grace Parsons 4/38 (7.3 overs)

New South Wales won by 2 wickets
Allan Border Field, Brisbane
Umpires: Joshua Adie (Aus) and Riki Wessels (Eng)
Player of the match: Tahlia Wilson (New South Wales)

- New South Wales won the toss and elected to field.
- Points: New South Wales 4, Queensland 0

Match 6
29 September 2024
10:00
Scorecard

Australian Capital Territory; 245 (50 overs)	v	South Australia (home team); 6/248 (42.3 overs)
Carly Leeson 71* (101); Eleanor Larosa 3/30 (8 overs)		Ellie Johnston 65* (51); Grace Dignam 2/49 (9 overs)

South Australia won by 4 wickets
Karen Rolton Oval, Adelaide
Umpires: Andrew Crozier and James Cushway
Player of the match: Ellie Johnston (South Australia)

- Australian Capital Territory won the toss and elected to bat.
- Points: South Australia 4, Australian Capital Territory 0

Match 7
3 October 2024
09:30
Scorecard

Western Australia; 81 (26.4 overs)	v	Queensland (home team); 2/83 (15.2 overs)
Lilly Mills 15 (31); Charli Knott 3/22 (5 overs)		Georgia Voll 61* (42); Charis Bekker 1/9 (2 overs)

Queensland won by 8 wickets
Allan Border Field, Brisbane
Umpires: Joshua Adie and N James
Player of the match: Georgia Voll (Queensland)

- Queensland won the toss and elected to field.
- Points: Queensland 5, Western Australia 0

Match 8
4 October 2024
09:30
Scorecard

(home team) New South Wales; 226 (47 overs)	v	Victoria; 8/229 (49.5 overs)
Tahlia Wilson 47 (63); Rhys McKenna 4/43 (9 overs)		Nicole Faltum 68 (93); Georgia Adams 3/14 (4 overs)

Victoria won by 2 wickets
North Sydney Oval, Sydney
Umpires: Mitchell Claydon and Janine Stainer
Player of the match: Nicole Faltum (Victoria)

- New South Wales won the toss and elected to bat.
- Points: Victoria 4, New South Wales 0

Match 9
4 October 2024
10:00
Scorecard

(home team) South Australia; 9/308 (50 overs)	v	Tasmania; 272 (45.2 overs)
Hollie Armitage 75 (88); Molly Strano 2/49 (9 overs)		Heather Graham 80 (66); Madeline Penna 3/38 (7.3 overs)

South Australia won by 36 runs
Karen Rolton Oval, Adelaide
Umpires: James Cushway and Peter George
Player of the match: Madeline Penna (South Australia)

- Tasmania won the toss and elected to field.
- Points: South Australia 4, Tasmania 0

Match 10
5 October 2024
09:30
Scorecard

(home team) Queensland; 4/331 (50 overs)	v	Western Australia; 9/285 (50 overs)
Georgia Voll 98 (94); Lilly Mills 2/64 (10 overs)		Chloe Piparo 104 (99); Nicola Hancock 3/53 (10 overs)

Queensland won by 46 runs
Allan Border Field, Brisbane
Umpires: N James (Aus) and Riki Wessels (Eng)
Player of the match: Georgia Voll (Queensland)

- Western Australia won the toss and elected to field.
- Points: Queensland 4, Western Australia 0

Match 11
6 October 2024
10:00
Scorecard

Victoria; 259 (49.5 overs)	v	New South Wales (home team); 230 (46.4 overs)
Georgia Prestwidge 53* (31); Georgia Adams 3/32 (9 overs)		Anika Learoyd 58 (83); Sophie Day 4/32 (9 overs)

Victoria won by 29 runs
North Sydney Oval, Sydney
Umpires: Andrew Hamilton and Bede Sajowitz
Player of the match: Georgia Prestwidge (Victoria)

- Victoria won the toss and elected to bat.
- Points: Victoria 4, New South Wales 0

Match 12
6 October 2024
10:00
Scorecard

(home team) South Australia; 9/290 (50 overs)	v	Tasmania; 250 (49 overs)
Hollie Armitage 99 (106); Nicola Carey 2/57 (8 overs)		Naomi Stalenberg 51 (70); Amanda-Jade Wellington 4/29 (10 overs)

South Australia won by 40 runs
Karen Rolton Oval, Adelaide
Umpires: Dhaval Bhatt (Aus) and Mary Waldron (Ire)
Player of the match: Hollie Armitage (South Australia)

- South Australia won the toss and elected to bat.
- Points: South Australia 4, Tasmania 0

Match 13
14 December 2024
10:30
Scorecard

(home team) Tasmania; 172 (43.5 overs)	v	New South Wales; 7/174 (47.2 overs)
Emma Manix-Geeves 48 (86); Sammy-Jo Johnson 2/20 (7 overs)		Tahlia Wilson 39 (43); Maisy Gibson 3/31 (10 overs)

New South Wales won by 3 wickets
Bellerive Oval, Hobart
Umpires: Simon Burns and Muhammad Qureshi
Player of the match: Sarah Coyte (New South Wales)

- New South Wales won the toss and elected to field.
- Points: New South Wales 4, Tasmania 0

Match 14
16 December 2024
10:30
Scorecard

New South Wales; 5/288 (50 overs)	v	Tasmania (home team); 129 (31.2 overs)
Elsa Hunter 93 (115); Molly Strano 2/64 (10 overs)		Amy Smith 25 (27); Caoimhe Bray 3/7 (3 overs)

New South Wales won by 159 runs
Bellerive Oval, Hobart
Umpires: Muhammad Qureshi and Melissa Scolyer
Player of the match: Elsa Hunter (New South Wales)

- New South Wales won the toss and elected to bat.
- Points: New South Wales 5, Tasmania 0

Match 15
18 December 2024
10:00
Scorecard

South Australia; 278 (50 overs)	v	Victoria (home team); 6/279 (49 overs)
Courtney Webb 110 (113); Georgia Prestwidge 3/47 (7 overs)		Ella Hayward 112* (119); Amanda-Jade Wellington 2/51 (10 overs)

Victoria won by 4 wickets
Junction Oval, Melbourne
Umpires: Chris Grant and Lisa McCabe
Player of the match: Ella Hayward (Victioria)

- South Australia won the toss and elected to bat.
- Points: Victoria 4, South Australia 0

Match 16
20 December 2024
10:00
Scorecard

(home team) Australian Capital Territory; 152 (39.3 overs)	v	Queensland; 7/153 (20.4 overs)
Katie Mack 60 (70); Sianna Ginger 2/17 (8 overs)		Lauren Winfield-Hill 43 (29); Anesu Mushangwe 3/48 (8.4 overs)

Queensland won by 3 wickets
Phillip Oval, Canberra
Umpires: Syed Humayun and Paul Miller
Player of the match: Sianna Ginger (Queensland)

- Australian Capital Territory won the toss and elected to bat.
- Points: Queensland 5, Australian Capital Territory 0

Match 17
20 December 2024
10:00
Scorecard

(home team) Victoria; 241 (45.5 overs)	v	South Australia; 5/243 (35.4 overs)
Meg Lanning 89* (89); Eleanor Larosa 3/30 (9 overs)		Courtney Webb 67* (62); Ella Hayward 2/35 (8 overs)

South Australia won by 5 wickets
Junction Oval, Melbourne
Umpires: Lisa McCabe and Malcolm Wood
Player of the match: Courtney Webb (South Australia)

- Victoria won the toss and elected to bat.
- Points: South Australia 5, Victoria 0

Match 18
22 December 2024
10:00
Scorecard

(home team) Australian Capital Territory; 168 (40.3 overs)	v	Queensland; 4/169 (28.1 overs)
Grace Dignam 31 (38); Jess Jonassen 4/31 (10 overs)		Charli Knott 79* (72); Grace Dignam 2/32 (6.1 overs)

Queensland won by 6 wickets
Phillip Oval, Canberra
Umpires: Paul Miller and Syed Humayun
Player of the match: Charli Knott (Queensland)

- Australian Capital Territory won the toss and elected to bat.
- Queensland 5, Australian Capital Territory 0

Match 19
12 January 2025
10:00
Scorecard

Victoria; 180 (49 overs)	v	Australian Capital Territory (home team); 8/183 (46.4 overs)
Sophie Reid 31 (61); Grace Dignam 4/44 (10 overs)		Katie Mack 51 (66); Sophie Day 2/29 (10 overs)

Australian Capital Territory won by 2 wickets
Phillip Oval, Canberra
Umpires: Syed Humayun and Lauren McGill
Player of the match: Katie Mack (Australian Capital Territory)

- Australian Capital Territory won the toss and elected to field.
- Points: Australian Capital Territory 4, Victoria 0

Match 20
12 January 2025
09:30
Scorecard

Tasmania; 198 (41.1 overs)	v	Queensland (home team); 155 (32.3 overs)
Tabatha Saville 50 (45); Charli Knott 3/39 (9 overs)		Georgia Redmayne 51 (79); Nicola Carey 3/26 (6.3 overs)

Tasmania won by 20 runs (DLS method)
Allan Border Field, Brisbane
Umpires: N James (Aus) and Riki Wessels (Eng)
Player of the match: Heather Graham (Tasmania)

- Queensland won the toss and elected to field.
- Queensland were set a revised target of 176 runs from 35 overs due to rain.
- Points: Tasmania 4, Queensland 0

Match 21
12 January 2025
10:00
Scorecard

New South Wales; 6/276 (50 overs)	v	Western Australia (home team); 235 (47.3 overs)
Anika Learoyd 101 (110); Naomi Dattani 1/37 (5 overs)		Maddy Darke 73 (76); Georgia Adams 3/17 (5.3 overs)

New South Wales won by 41 runs
WACA Ground, Perth
Umpires: Kate Holloman and Peta Merrilees
Player of the match: Anika Learoyd (New South Wales)

- Western Australia won the toss and elected to field.
- Points: New South Wales 4, Western Australia 0

Match 22
14 January 2025
10:00
Scorecard

Victoria; 172 (38.1 overs)	v	Australian Capital Territory (home team); 2/173 (32.2 overs)
Sophie Reid 40 (51); Carly Leeson 4/33 (10 overs)		Olivia Porter 80* (101); Milly Illingworth 1/35 (7 overs)

Australian Capital Territory won by 8 wickets
Phillip Oval, Canberra
Umpires: Lauren McGill and Paul Miller
Player of the match: Olivia Porter (Australian Capital Territory)

- Australian Capital Territory won the toss and elected to field.
- Points: Australian Capital Territory 5, Victoria 0

Match 23
14 January 2025
09:30
Scorecard

(home team) Queensland; 294 (43 overs)	v	Tasmania; 280 (48.5 overs)
Grace Harris 140 (78); Maisy Gibson 2/36 (9 overs)		Nicola Carey 120 (132); Courtney Sippel 3/66 (9.5 overs)

Queensland won by 14 runs
Allan Border Field, Brisbane
Umpires: N James (Aus) and Riki Wessels (Eng)
Player of the match: Grace Harris (Queensland)

- Tasmania won the toss and elected to field.
- Points: Queensland 4, Tasmania 0

Match 24
14 January 2025
10:00
Scorecard

New South Wales; 102 (32 overs)	v	Western Australia (home team); 3/106 (26.2 overs)
Elsa Hunter 30 (42); Amy Edgar 4/10 (7 overs)		Maddy Darke 49* (72); Sarah Coyte 1/19 (5 overs)

Western Australia won by 7 wickets
WACA Ground, Perth
Umpires: Kate Holloman and Peta Merrilees
Player of the match: Amy Edgar (Western Australia)

- New South wales won the toss and elected to bat.
- Points: Western Australia 5, New South Wales 0

Match 25
27 January 2025
10:00
Scorecard

Western Australia; 8/229 (47 overs)	v	Victoria (home team); 8/223 (43.3 overs)
Mathilda Carmichael 64 (85); Georgia Prestwidge 3/35 (9 overs)		Meg Lanning 49 (36); Zoe Britcliffe 4/32 (9 overs)

Victoria won by 2 wickets (DLS method)
Junction Oval, Melbourne
Umpires: Ashfaq Ali and Clare Haysom
Player of the match: Zoe Britcliffe (Western Australia)

- Victoria won the toss and elected to field.
- Western Australia innings curtailed at 47 overs due to rain.
- Victoria were set a revised target of 223 runs from 44 overs.
- Points: Victoria 4, Western Australia 0

Match 26
29 January 2025
10:00
Scorecard

Western Australia; 8/275 (50 overs)	v	Victoria (home team); 9/276 (49.4 overs)
Mikayla Hinkley 83 (78); Georgia Prestwidge 2/24 (5 overs)		Meg Lanning 95 (79); Amy Edgar 3/36 (10 overs)

Victoria won by 1 wicket
Junction Oval, Melbourne
Umpires: Ashfaq Ali and Gaurav Bawa
Player of the match: Meg Lanning (Victoria)

- Victoria won the toss and elected to field.
- Points: Victoria 4, Western Australia 0

Match 27
1 February 2025
10:00
Scorecard

Queensland; 5/312 (50 overs)	v	South Australia (home team); 303 (50 overs)
Georgia Redmayne 125* (139); Emmerson Filsell 2/49 (7 overs)		Courtney Webb 120 (118); Nicola Hancock 4/53 (10 overs)

Queensland won by 9 runs
Adelaide Oval, Adelaide
Umpires: Dhaval Bhatt and Kurt Miegel
Player of the match: Georgia Redmayne (Queensland)

- South Australia won the toss and elected to field.
- Points: Queensland 3.5, South Australia 0

Match 28
1 February 2025
10:30
Scorecard

(home team) Tasmania; 6/284 (50 overs)	v	Australian Capital Territory; 181 (42.2 overs)
Elyse Villani 117 (117); Carly Leeson 2/64 (10 overs)		Katie Mack 52 (65); Maisy Gibson 4/40 (10 overs)

Tasmania won by 103 runs
Bellerive Oval, Hobart
Umpires: Sam Burns and Melissa Scolyer
Player of the match: Elyse Villani (Tasmania)

- Australian Capital Territory won the toss and elected to field.
- Points: Tasmania 5, Australian Capital Territory 0

Match 29
3 February 2025
10:00
Scorecard

Queensland; 7/327 (50 overs)	v	South Australia (home team); 287 (46.4 overs)
Charli Knott 110 (118); Amanda-Jade Wellington 4/61 (10 overs)		Hollie Armitage 100 (82); Grace Parsons 3/45 (7 overs)

Queensland won by 40 runs
Adelaide Oval, Adelaide
Umpires: Dhaval Bhatt and Kurt Miegel
Player of the match: Charli Knott (Queensland)

- Queensland won the toss and elected to bat.
- Points: Queensland 4, South Australia 0

Match 30
3 February 2025
10:30
Scorecard

Australian Capital Territory; 153 (42.1 overs)	v	Tasmania (home team); 2/156 (29.4 overs)
Shivani Mehta 52 (72); Lauren Smith 3/28 (8 overs)		Rachel Trenaman 80* (96); Grace Dignam 1/29 (5.4 overs)

Tasmania won by 8 wickets
Bellerive Oval, Hobart
Umpires: Simon Burns and Muhammad Qureshi
Player of the match: Maisy Gibson (Tasmania)

- Australian Capital Territory won the toss and elected to bat.
- Points: Tasmania 5, Australian Capital Territory 0

Match 31
7 February 2025
10:00
Scorecard

(home team) New South Wales; 229 (47.4 overs)	v	South Australia; 185 (40.4 overs)
Tahlia Wilson 112* (126); Madeline Penna 4/28 (8 overs)		Madeline Penna 40 (50); Samantha Bates 4/31 (8.4 overs)

New South Wales won by 44 runs
Cricket Central, Sydney
Umpires: Andrew Hamilton and Mitchell Claydon
Player of the match: Tahlia Wilson (New South Wales)

- New South Wales won the toss and elected to bat.
- Points: New South Wales 4, South Australia 0

Match 32
7 February 2025
10:00
Scorecard

(home team) Australian Capital Territory; 7/208 (50 overs)	v	Western Australia; 4/209 (46.4 overs)
Holly Ferling 47* (72); Emily Arlott 3/40 (10 overs)		Mathilda Carmichael 61* (84); Grace Dignam 2/28 (9 overs)

Western Australia won by 6 wickets
Phillip Oval, Canberra
Umpires: David Taylor and Syed Humayun
Player of the match: Maddy Darke (Western Australia)

- Western Australia won the toss and elected to field.
- Points: Western Australia 4, Australian Capital Territory 0

Match 33
7 February 2025
10:00
Scorecard

(home team) Victoria; 5/295 (50 overs)	v	Queensland; 3/299 (39.3 overs)
Sophie Reid 106 (123); Lily Bassingthwaighte 2/37 (7 overs)		Georgia Voll 94 (75); Jas Nevins 1/28 (3 overs)

Queensland won by 7 wickets
Junction Oval, Melbourne
Umpires: Gaurav Bawa and Malcolm Wood
Player of the match: Georgia Voll (Queensland)

- Queensland won the toss and elected to field.
- Points: Queensland 5, Victoria 0

Match 34
9 February 2025
10:00
Scorecard

(home team) New South Wales; 9/241 (50 overs)	v	South Australia; 8/242 (49.5 overs)
Anika Learoyd 71 (98); Madeline Penna 4/40 (8 overs)		Bridget Patterson 90 (105); Sammy-Jo Johnson 3/37 (8 overs)

South Australia won by 2 wickets
Cricket Central, Sydney
Umpires: Andrew Hamilton and Mitchell Claydon
Player of the match: Bridget Patterson (South Australia)

- New South Wales won the toss and elected to bat.
- Points: South Australia 4, New South Wales 0

Match 35
9 February 2025
10:00
Scorecard

(home team) Australian Capital Territory; 9/253 (50 overs)	v	Western Australia; 175 (45.3 overs)
Katie Mack 85 (98); Amy Edgar 3/32 (10 overs)		Mikayla Hinkley 59 (94); Grace Dignam 3/35 (10 overs)

Australian Capital Territory won by 78 runs
Phillip Oval, Canberra
Umpires: David Taylor and Syed Humayun
Player of the match: Katie Mack (Australian Capital Territory)

- Western Australia won the toss and elected to field.
- Points: Australian Capital Territory 5, Western Australia 0

Match 36
9 February 2025
10:00
Scorecard

Queensland; 167 (39.2 overs)	v	Victoria (home team); 4/168 (37.5 overs)
Charli Knott 62 (82); Ella Hayward 6/31 (10 overs)		Nicole Faltum 82 (118); Nicola Hancock 2/31 (10 overs)

Victoria won by 6 wickets
Junction Oval, Melbourne
Umpires: Gaurav Bawa and Clare Haysom
Player of the match: Ella Hayward (Victoria)

- Victoria won the toss and elected to field.
- Points: Victoria 5, Queensland 0

Match 37
19 February 2025
10:00
Scorecard

(home team) New South Wales; 8/271 (50 overs)	v	Australian Capital Territory; 229 (47.4 overs)
Tahlia Wilson 142 (159); Anesu Mushangwe 3/54 (10 overs)		Grace Dignam 50 (59); Sammy-Jo Johnson 4/40 (10 overs)

New South Wales won by 42 runs
Cricket Central, Sydney
Umpires: Andrew Hamilton and Bede Sajowitz
Player of the match: Tahlia Wilson (New South Wales)

- Australian Capital Territory won the toss and elected to field.
- Points: New South Wales 4, Australian Capital Territory 0

Match 38
19 February 2025
10:30
Scorecard

(home team) Tasmania; 5/254 (50 overs)	v	Victoria; 9/253 (50 overs)
Rachel Trenaman 124 (141); Ella Hayward 3/44 (10 overs)		Ella Hayward 84 (103); Amy Smith 5/45 (7 overs)

Tasmania won by 1 run
Bellerive Oval, Hobart
Umpires: Simon Burns and Melissa Scolyer
Player of the match: Rachel Trenaman (Tasmania)

- Victoria won the toss and elected to field.
- Points: Tasmania 4, Victoria 0

Match 39
19 February 2025
10:00
Scorecard

South Australia; 9/287 (50 overs)	v	Western Australia (home team); 240 (49.5 overs)
Bridget Patterson 65 (70); Amy Edgar 3/47 (10 overs)		Maddy Darke 74 (91); Jemma Barsby 3/28 (9 overs)

South Australia won by 47 runs
WACA Ground, Perth
Umpires: Jarryd Buscall and Jamie Thomas
Player of the match: Jemma Barsby (South Australia)

- South Australia won the toss and elected to bat.
- Points: South Australia 4, Western Australia 0

Match 40
21 February 2025
10:00
Scorecard

Australian Capital Territory; 7/265 (50 overs)	v	New South Wales (home team); 2/146 (29.2 overs)
Grace Lyons 97 (111); Hannah Darlington 2/23 (5 overs)		Elsa Hunter 42 (66); Holly Ferling 1/20 (6 overs)

New South Wales won by 8 wickets (DLS method)
Cricket Central, Sydney
Umpires: Andrew Hamilton and Lauren McGill
Player of the match: Grace Lyons (Australian Capital Territory)

- Australian Capital Territory won the toss and elected to bat.
- The second innings was reduced to 31 overs due to rain.
- New South Wales were set a revised target of 143 runs from 31 overs.
- Points: New South Wales 4, Australian Capital Territory 0

Match 41
21 February 2025
10:00
Scorecard

(home team) Western Australia; 9/254 (50 overs)	v	South Australia; 9/248 (50 overs)
Maddy Darke 86 (93); Amanda-Jade Wellington 3/41 (10 overs)		Jemma Barsby 54* (69); Amy Edgar 4/42 (10 overs)

Western Australia won by 6 runs
WACA Ground, Perth
Umpires: Kate Holloman and Jamie Thomas
Player of the match: Bhavisha Devchand (Western Australia)

- Western Australia won the toss and elected to bat.
- Points: Western Australia 4, South Australia 0

Match 42
21 February 2025
14:00 (D/N)
Scorecard

(home team) Tasmania; 8/259 (50 overs)	v	Victoria; 229 (48.1 overs)
Elyse Villani 110 (104); Sophie Day 3/66 (10 overs)		Tess Flintoff 80 (101); Molly Strano 3/38 (10 overs)

Tasmania won by 30 runs
Bellerive Oval, Hobart
Umpires: Sam Burns and Muhammad Qureshi
Player of the match: Elyse Villani (Tasmania)

- Victoria won the toss and elected to field.
- Points: Tasmania 4, Victoria 0

== Final ==
2 March 2025
13:35 (D/N)
Scorecard

New South Wales; 215 (48 overs)	v	Queensland (home team); 194 (46.5 overs)
Anika Learoyd 80 (110); Grace Parsons 3/29 (10 overs)		Georgia Redmayne 97 (122); Lauren Cheatle 2/32 (8 overs)

New South Wales won by 21 runs
Allan Border Field, Brisbane
Umpires: Gerard Abood and Michael Graham-Smith
Player of the match: Anika Learoyd (New South Wales)

- New South Wales won the toss and elected to bat.

== See also ==
- T20 Spring Challenge
- 2024 T20 Spring Challenge
