= 2024 T20 Spring Challenge =

Cricket tournament

- Dates: 11 – 20 October 2024
- Administrator: Cricket Australia
- Cricket format: Twenty20
- Tournament format(s): Group stage and knockout
- Champions: Hobart Hurricanes (1st title)
- Runners-up: Brisbane Heat
- Participants: 9
- Matches: 21
- Player of the series: Tahlia Wilson (Sydney Thunder)
- Most runs: Lizelle Lee (Hobart Hurricanes) (252)
- Most wickets: Nicola Hancock (Brisbane Heat) (10)
- Official website: Cricket Australia

The 2024 T20 Spring Challenge, was the inaugural season of the T20 Spring Challenge, a professional Twenty20 cricket competition in Australia. The tournament was played from 11 to 20 October 2024.

In the final, Hobart Hurricanes defeated Brisbane Heat by five wickets to win the inaugural title.

== Background ==
The 2026 T20 Spring Challenge was the inaugural edition of the tournament, organised by Cricket Australia as a women's domestic T20 competition ahead of the Women's Big Bash League. It featured the eight WBBL teams and the ACT Meteors, with the tournament played in Sydney from 11 to 20 October 2024.

=== Broadcasting ===
All the games were streamed on Kayo Sports, cricket.com.au and the CA Live app.

== Teams and Squads ==
ACT Meteors	Adelaide Strikers	Brisbane Heat	Hobart Hurricanes	Melbourne Renegades	Melbourne Stars	Perth Scorchers	Sydney Sixers	Sydney Thunder
Head Coaches
Erin Osborne			Jude Coleman					
Captains
Carly Leeson		Georgia Redmayne	Elyse Villani	Sarah Coyte		Chloe Piparo	Mathilda Carmichael	Tahlia Wilson
Players
Alisha Bates; Paris Bowdler; Zoe Cooke; Grace Dignam; Holly Ferling; Angelina Genford; Amy Hunter; Grace Lyons; Shivani Mehta; Chelsea Moscript; Gabrielle Sutcliffe; Annie Wikman	Jemma Barsby; Maggie Clark; Emmerson Filsell; Paris Hall; Ellie Johnston; Eleanor Larosa; Katie Mack; Anesu Mushangwe; Courtney Neale; Annie O'Neil; Bridget Patterson; Madeline Penna; Amanda-Jade Wellington	Charli Knott (vc); Lily Bassingthwaighte; Lucinda Bourke; Sianna Ginger; Lilli Hamilton; Lucy Hamilton; Nicola Hancock; Laura Harris; Kira Holmes; Ruby Strange; Lauren Winfield-Hill; Mikayla Wrigley	Mia Barwick; Nicola Carey; Julia Cavanough; Heather Graham; Ruth Johnston; Emma Manix-Geeves; Beth Lane; Lizelle Lee; Tabatha Saville; Hayley Silver-Holmes; Lauren Smith; Molly Strano; Callie Wilson	Emma de Brough; Tia Davidge; Samara Dulvin; Nicole Faltum; Poppy Gardner; Ella Hayward; Milly Illingworth; Sara Kennedy; Bronte Leishman; Georgia Prestwidge; Naomi Stalenberg; Courtney Webb	Sophie Day; Tess Flintoff; Maisy Gibson; Hasrat Gill; Olivia Henry; Meg Lanning; Rhys McKenna; Sasha Moloney; Indigo Noble; Mia Perrin; Sophie Reid; Zoe Samuel; Holly Spencer	Chloe Bartholomew; Charis Bekker; Zoe Britcliffe; Stella Campbell; Maddy Darke; Bhavi Devchand; Mikayla Hinkley; Shay Manolini; Rebecca McGrath; Ines McKeon; Lilly Mills; Morgan Pires	Caoimhe Bray; Maitlin Brown; Erin Burns; Lauren Cheatle; Lucy Finn; Elsa Hunter; Lauren Kua; Isabella Malgioglio; Frankie Nicklin; Kate Pelle; Kate Peterson; Eva Ragg; Courtney Sippel	Georgia Adams; Jade Allen; Samantha Bates; Ella Briscoe; Hannah Darlington; Sienna Eve; Ebony Hoskin; Sammy-Jo Johnson; Anika Learoyd; Claire Moore; Taneale Peschel; Georgia Voll

== Venues ==
2024 T20 Spring Challenge is located in Australia	Adelaide	Sydney			
2024 T20 Spring Challenge is located in Australia	Karen Rolton Oval, Adelaide	North Sydney Oval, Sydney	Cricket Central, Sydney	Allan Border Oval, Sydney	Hurstville Oval, Sydney

== Standing ==
Pos	Team	Pld	W	L	NR	Pts	NRR	
1	Brisbane Heat (R)	4	3	1	0	6	1.917	Advanced to Knockout Stage
2	Hobart Hurricanes (C)	4	3	1	0	6	0.905	Advanced to Knockout Stage
3	Melbourne Stars	4	3	1	0	6	0.364	Advanced to Knockout Stage
4	Adelaide Strikers	4	2	2	0	4	0.041	Advanced to Knockout Stage
5	ACT Meteors	4	2	2	0	4	−0.247	Eliminated
6	Sydney Thunder	4	2	2	0	4	−0.324	Eliminated
7	Melbourne Renegades	4	1	3	0	2	−0.231	Eliminated
8	Sydney Sixers	4	1	3	0	2	−0.721	Eliminated
9	Perth Scorchers	4	1	3	0	2	−1.446	Eliminated

Source: ESPNcricinfo
(C) Champions; (R) Runners-up

== Fixtures ==
On 28 July 2024, Cricket Australia confirmed the full schedule for the tournament.

Match 1
11 October 2024
10:00 UTC+11
Scorecard

Sydney Thunder; 8/151 (20 overs)	v	Brisbane Heat; 1/157 (12.2 overs)
Georgia Voll 42 (25); Charli Knott 2/27 (4 overs)		Laura Harris 102* (46); Sammy-Jo Johnson 1/27 (2.2 overs)

Brisbane Heat won by 9 wickets
North Sydney Oval, Sydney
Umpires: Mitchell Claydon and Bede Sajowitz
Player of the match: Laura Harris (Brisbane Heat)

- Brisbane Heat won the toss and elected to field.
- Laura Harris (Brisbane Heat) scored her first century in T20s.

Match 2
11 October 2024
10:00 UTC+10:30
Scorecard

Hobart Hurricanes; 5/169 (20 overs)	v	Melbourne Renegades; 5/170 (19.1 overs)
Heather Graham 31 (16); Sara Kennedy 2/26 (4 overs); Georgia Prestwidge 2/26 (4 overs)		Nicole Faltum 43* (24); Hayley Silver-Holmes 3/25 (4 overs)

Melbourne Renegades won by 5 wickets
Karen Rolton Oval, Adelaide
Umpires: Dhaval Bhatt and Kurt Miegel
Player of the match: Nicole Faltum (Melbourne Renegades)

- Melbourne Renegades won the toss and elected to field.

Match 3
11 October 2024
14:30 UTC+11
Scorecard

ACT Meteors; 6/172 (20 overs)	v	Sydney Sixers; 5/159 (20 overs)
Annie Wikman 37 (26); Caoimhe Bray 2/19 (4 overs)		Kate Pelle 56 (59); Grace Dignam 2/35 (4 overs)

ACT Meteors won by 13 runs
North Sydney Oval, Sydney
Umpires: Mitchell Claydon and Bede Sajowitz
Player of the match: Angelina Genford (ACT Meteors)

- Sydney Sixers won the toss and elected to field.

Match 4
11 October 2024
14:30 UTC+10:30
Scorecard

Adelaide Strikers; 5/150 (20 overs)	v	Perth Scorchers; 9/135 (20 overs)
Katie Mack 37 (28); Bhavi Devchand 3/21 (3 overs)		Maddy Darke 35 (31); Eleanor Larosa 4/26 (4 overs)

Adelaide Strikers won by 15 runs
Karen Rolton Oval, Adelaide
Umpires: Dhaval Bhatt and Kurt Miegel
Player of the match: Eleanor Larosa (Adelaide Strikers)

- Perth Scorchers won the toss and elected to field.

Match 5
12 October 2024
14:30 UTC+11
Scorecard

ACT Meteors; 4/147 (20 overs)	v	Melbourne Stars; 109 (16.3 overs)
Carly Leeson 68* (47); Sophie Day 2/34 (4 overs)		Maisy Gibson 18* (9); Grace Dignam 3/16 (2.3 overs)

ACT Meteors won by 38 runs
North Sydney Oval, Sydney
Umpires: Andrew Hamilton and Roberto Howard
Player of the match: Carly Leeson (ACT Meteors)

- Melbourne Stars won the toss and elected to field.

Match 6
12 October 2024
14:30 UTC+10:30
Scorecard

Melbourne Renegades; 3/169 (20 overs)	v	Perth Scorchers; 9/170 (19.3 overs)
Emma de Broughe 54 (41); Charis Bekker 2/32 (4 overs)		Chloe Piparo 82* (47); Sarah Coyte 3/19 (4 overs)

Perth Scorchers won by 1 wicket
Karen Rolton Oval, Adelaide
Umpires: Peter George and Mary Waldron
Player of the match: Chloe Piparo (Perth Scorchers)

- Perth Scorchers won the toss and elected to field.

Match 7
12 October 2024
19:00 UTC+11
Scorecard

Sydney Sixers; 5/147 (20 overs)	v	Brisbane Heat; 9/144 (20 overs)
Mathilda Carmichael 41 (39); Sianna Ginger 2/27 (4 overs)		Georgia Redmayne 41 (31); Juliette Morton 3/16 (4 overs)

Sydney Sixers won by 3 runs
North Sydney Oval, Sydney
Umpires: Andrew Hamilton and Roberto Howard
Player of the match: Elsa Hunter (Sydney Sixers)

- Brisbane Heat won the toss and elected to field.

Match 8
12 October 2024
19:00 UTC+10:30
Scorecard

Adelaide Strikers; 137 (20 overs)	v	Hobart Hurricanes; 5/141 (18.1 overs)
Eleanor Larosa 31 (38); Molly Strano 3/22 (4 overs)		Lizelle Lee 112 * (70); Courtney Neale 2/24 (3 overs)

Hobart Hurricanes won by 5 wickets
Karen Rolton Oval, Adelaide
Umpires: Dhaval Bhatt and Mary Waldron
Player of the match: Lizelle Lee (Hobart Hurricanes)

- Hobart Hurricanes won the toss and elected to field.

Match 9
13 October 2024
14:30 UTC+11
Scorecard

Sydney Thunder; 9/103 (20 overs)	v	Melbourne Stars; 3/104 (13.2 overs)
Ella Briscoe 32* (31); Hasrat Gill 3/12 (4 overs)		Sophie Reid 46* (29); Georgia Voll 1/12 (2 overs)

Melbourne Stars won by 7 wickets
Allan Border Oval, Sydney
Umpires: Mitchell Claydon and Roberto Howard
Player of the match: Sophie Reid (Melbourne Stars)

- Sydney Thunder won the toss and elected to bat.

Match 10
14 October 2024
10:00 UTC+11
Scorecard

ACT Meteors; 93 (16.1 overs)	v	Brisbane Heat; 3/94 (12.2 overs)
Carly Leeson 41 (30); Sianna Ginger 3/14 (3 overs)		Mikayla Wrigley 32* (30); Zoe Cooke 1/11 (2.2 overs)

Brisbane Heat won by 7 wickets
Allan Border Oval, Sydney
Umpires: Mitchell Claydon and Roberto Howard
Player of the match: Sianna Ginger (Brisbane Heat)

- ACT Meteors win the toss and elected to bat.

Match 11
14 October 2024
14:30 UTC+10:30
Scorecard

Perth Scorchers; 5/136 (20 overs)	v	Hobart Hurricanes; 2/139 (15.1 overs)
Mikayla Hinkley 32 (31); Callie Wilson 3/25 (4 overs)		Ruth Johnston 50* (37); Chloe Bartholomew 1/22 (2 overs)

Hobart Hurricanes won by 8 wickets
Karen Rolton Oval, Adelaide
Umpires: Peter George and Mary Waldron
Player of the match: Ruth Johnston (Hobart Hurricanes)

- Hobart Hurricanes won the toss and elected to field.

Match 12
15 October 2024
14:00 UTC+11
Scorecard

Sydney Sixers; 5/130 (19 overs)	v	Melbourne Stars; 2/134 (17.2 overs)
Erin Burns 65* (49); Indigo Noble 2/18 (3 overs)		Meg Lanning 92* (57); Juliette Morton 1/11 (2 overs)

Melbourne Stars won by 8 wickets
Hurstville Oval, Sydney
Umpires: Mitchell Claydon and Andrew Hamilton
Player of the match: Meg Lanning (Melbourne Stars)

- Melbourne Stars won the toss and elected to field.
- Rain reduced the match to 19 overs per side.

Match 13
15 October 2024
14:30 UTC+10:30
Scorecard

Adelaide Strikers; 5/173 (20 overs)	v	Melbourne Renegades; 156 (18.3 overs)
Madeline Penna 113 (64); Emma de Broughe 1/19 (4 overs)		Courtney Webb 36 (16); Amanda-Jade Wellington 4/18 (3.3 overs)

Adelaide Strikers won by 17 runs
Karen Rolton Oval, Adelaide
Umpires: James Cushway and Peter George
Player of the match: Madeline Penna (Adelaide Strikers)

- Melbourne Renegades won the toss and elected to field.
- Madeline Penna (Adelaide Strikers) scored her first century in T20s.

Match 14
16 October 2024
10:00 UTC+11
Scorecard

ACT Meteors; 7/122 (20 overs)	v	Hobart Hurricanes; 7/126 (18.1 overs)
Zoe Cooke 25* (21); Molly Strano 2/19 (4 overs)		Tabatha Saville 22 (19); Grace Dignam 3/24 (4 overs)

Hobart Hurricanes won by 3 wickets
Cricket Central, Sydney
Umpires: Andrew Hamilton and Bede Sajowitz
Player of the match: Molly Strano (Hobart Hurricanes)

- ACT Meteors won the toss and elected to bat.

Match 15
16 October 2024
10:00 UTC+10:30
Scorecard

Adelaide Strikers; 6/175 (20 overs)	v	Brisbane Heat; 4/176 (18.5 overs)
Katie Mack 47 (33); Ruby Strange 4/31 (3 overs)		Georgia Redmayne 96 (55); Eleanor Larosa 1/11 (3 overs)

Brisbane Heat won by 6 wickets
Karen Rolton Oval, Adelaide
Umpires: Dhaval Bhatt and James Cushway
Player of the match: Georgia Redmayne (Brisbane Heat)

- Brisbane Heat won the toss and elected to field.

Match 16
16 October 2024
14:30 UTC+11
Scorecard

Sydney Thunder; 3/183 (20 overs)	v	Perth Scorchers; 9/122 (20 overs)
Tahlia Wilson 81 (57); Shay Manolini 1/15 (2 overs)		Maddy Darke 40 (41); Hannah Darlington 3/18 (4 overs)

Sydney Thunder won by 61 runs
Cricket Central, Sydney
Umpires: Andrew Hamilton and Bede Sajowitz
Player of the match: Tahlia Wilson (Sydney Thunder)

- Perth Scorchers won the toss and elected to field.

Match 17
17 October 2024
10:00 UTC+11
Scorecard

Sydney Sixers; 9/114 (20 overs)	v	Sydney Thunder; 2/116 (16.2 overs)
Elsa Hunter 30 (35); Samantha Bates 3/21 (4 overs)		Tahlia Wilson 54* (50); Caoimhe Bray 2/19 (3 overs)

Sydney Thunder won by 8 wickets
Cricket Central, Sydney
Umpires: Mitchell Claydon and Roberto Howard
Player of the match: Tahlia Wilson (Sydney Thunder)

- Sydney Sixers won the toss and elected to bat.

Match 18
17 October 2024
14:30 UTC+11
Scorecard

Melbourne Renegades; 8/139 (20 overs)	v	Melbourne Stars; 9/143 (20 overs)
Courtney Webb 39 (31); Sophie Day 3/24 (4 overs)		Rhys McKenna 32 (13); Sarah Coyte 3/31 (4 overs)

Melbourne Stars won by 1 wicket
Cricket Central, Sydney
Umpires: Mitch Claydon and Roberto Howard
Player of the match: Sophie Day (Melbourne Stars)

- Melbourne Stars won the toss and elected to field.

== Knockout Stage ==
Semi-finals
1	Brisbane Heat	9/160 (20 overs)
4	Adelaide Strikers	9/122 (20 overs)
2	Hobart Hurricanes	7/166 (18.4 overs)
3	Melbourne Stars

Final
SFW1	Brisbane Heat	9/133 (20 overs)
SFW2	Hobart Hurricanes	5/134 (20 overs)

=== Semi-finals ===
19 October 2024
10:00 UTC+11
Scorecard

Brisbane Heat; 9/160 (20 overs)	v	Adelaide Strikers; 9/122 (20 overs)
Sianna Ginger 46 (38); Anesu Mushangwe 2/26 (4 overs)		Ellie Johnston 35 (27); Nicola Hancock 4/24 (4 overs)

Brisbane Heat won by 38 runs
Cricket Central, Sydney
Umpires: Mitch Claydon and Sharad Patel
Player of the match: Sianna Ginger (Brisbane Heat)

- Adelaide Strikers won the toss and elected to field first.

19 October 2024
14:30 UTC+11
Scorecard

Hobart Hurricanes; 7/166 (18.4 overs)	v	Melbourne Stars
Nicola Carey 77 (43); Maisy Gibson 3/29 (4 overs)

No result
Cricket Central, Sydney
Umpires: Bede Sajowitz and David Taylor

- Hobart Hurricanes won the toss and elected to bat.
- No further play was possible due to rain.
- Hobart Hurricanes qualified for the final due to higher position in the points table.

=== Final ===
20 October 2024
14:30 UTC+11
Scorecard

Brisbane Heat; 9/133 (20 overs)	v	Hobart Hurricanes; 5/134 (20 overs)
Sianna Ginger 24 (21); Ruth Johnston 4/20 (4 overs)		Lizelle Lee 63 (47); Ruby Strange 1/10 (2 overs)

Hobart Hurricanes won by 5 wickets
Cricket Central, Sydney
Umpires: David Taylor and Sharad Patel
Player of the match: Lizelle Lee (Hobart Hurricanes)

- Brisbane Heat won the toss and elected to bat.
