= 2022–23 Sydney Sixers WBBL season =

Sydney Sixers
2022–23 season
- Sydney Sixers 2022–23 cap logo
- Coach: Charlotte Edwards
- Captain(s): Ellyse Perry
- Home ground: North Sydney Oval
- League: WBBL
- Record: 11–2 (1st)
- Finals: Runners-up
- Leading Run Scorer: Ellyse Perry – 408
- Leading Wicket Taker: Ashleigh Gardner – 23
- Player of the Season: Ashleigh Gardner

The 2022–23 Sydney Sixers Women's season was the eighth in the team's history. Coached by Charlotte Edwards and captained by Ellyse Perry, the Sixers finished the regular season of WBBL|08 in first position and set a new league record with eleven wins. They consequently qualified for their fifth Final appearance, returning to the knockout phase of the tournament for the first time since WBBL|04. In the championship decider, held at North Sydney Oval, the Sixers were defeated in an upset by the Adelaide Strikers.

== Squad ==
Each 2022–23 squad was made up of 15 active players. Teams could sign up to five 'marquee players', with a maximum of three of those from overseas. Marquees were defined as any overseas player, or a local player who holds a Cricket Australia national contract at the start of the WBBL|08 signing period.

Personnel changes made ahead of the season included:

- Charlotte Edwards was appointed head coach of the Sixers, replacing Ben Sawyer.
- Indian marquees Shafali Verma and Radha Yadav did not re-sign with the Sixers.
- New Zealand marquee Suzie Bates signed with the Sixers, having previously played for the Perth Scorchers and Adelaide Strikers.
- English marquee Sophie Ecclestone signed with the Sixers, marking her first appearance in the league.
- Hayley Silver-Holmes departed the Sixers, signing with the Hobart Hurricanes.
- Angelina Genford signed with the Sixers, departing the Hobart Hurricanes.
- Kate Peterson signed with the Sixers, departing the Sydney Thunder.

The table below lists the Sixers players and their key stats (including runs scored, batting strike rate, wickets taken, economy rate, catches and stumpings) for the season.

No.	Name	Nat.	Birth date	Batting style	Bowling style	G	R	SR	W	E	C	S	Notes
Batters
12	Nicole Bolton	(Australia)	17 January 1989	Left-handed	Right-arm off spin	15	135	113.44	5	7.58	4	–	
All-rounders
11	Suzie Bates	(New Zealand)	16 September 1987	Right-handed	Right-arm medium	15	318	104.60	–	–	11	–	Overseas marquee
29	Erin Burns	(Australia)	22 June 1988	Right-handed	Right-arm off spin	15	295	145.32	1	12.00	1	–	
6	Ashleigh Gardner	(Australia)	15 April 1997	Right-handed	Right-arm off spin	15	339	150.66	23	6.63	11	–	Australian marquee
8	Ellyse Perry	(Australia)	3 November 1990	Right-handed	Right-arm fast-medium	15	408	119.64	6	8.00	15	–	Captain, Australian marquee
30	Angela Reakes	(Australia)	27 December 1990	Right-handed	Right-arm leg spin	–	–	–	–	–	–	–	Unavailable for the season
Wicket-keepers
77	Alyssa Healy	(Australia)	24 March 1990	Right-handed	–	15	330	125.47	–	–	4	6	Australian marquee
Bowlers
9	Jade Allen	(Australia)	13 November 2003	Right-handed	Right-arm leg spin	2	–	–	–	–	0	–	
88	Maitlan Brown	(Australia)	5 June 1997	Right-handed	Right-arm fast	9	105	161.53	12	7.81	4	–	
33	Stella Campbell	(Australia)	15 June 2002	Right-handed	Right-arm medium	6	–	–	0	14.00	4	–	
5	Lauren Cheatle	(Australia)	6 November 1998	Left-handed	Left-arm fast medium	15	1	100.00	16	7.24	3	–	
19	Sophie Ecclestone	(England)	6 May 1999	Right-handed	Left-arm orthodox spin	15	126	159.49	20	6.29	2	–	Overseas marquee
66	Angelina Genford	(Australia)	30 October 2002	Right-handed	Right-arm fast medium	15	4	57.14	1	9.00	3	–	
22	Emma Hughes	(Australia)	13 November 2000	Right-handed	Right-arm medium	–	–	–	–	–	–	–	Unavailable for the season
35	Kate Peterson	(Australia)	3 December 2002	Right-handed	Right-arm fast medium	13	10	76.92	11	7.28	5	–	

== Ladder ==
Pos	Team	Pld	W	L	NR	Pts	NRR
1	Sydney Sixers (RU)	14	11	2	1	23	0.695
2	Adelaide Strikers (C)	14	8	5	1	17	0.390
3	Brisbane Heat (CF)	14	8	5	1	17	0.276
4	Hobart Hurricanes (EF)	14	7	6	1	15	0.457
5	Perth Scorchers	14	6	7	1	13	0.373
6	Melbourne Stars	14	5	6	3	13	−0.339
7	Melbourne Renegades	14	4	9	1	9	−1.042
8	Sydney Thunder	14	1	10	3	5	−1.000

Source: cricket.com.au, ESPN Cricinfo
- The top 4 teams advanced to the play-off phase

== Fixtures ==
All times are AEDT

=== Regular season ===
Match 1
13 October 2022
19:40 (N)
Scorecard

Brisbane Heat; 8/141 (20 overs)	v	Sydney Sixers; 6/143 (19.5 overs)
Georgia Redmayne 49 (39); Maitlan Brown 3/20 (3 overs)		Ellyse Perry 55 (48); Jess Kerr 2/17 (4 overs)

Sydney Sixers won by 4 wickets (with 1 ball remaining)
Great Barrier Reef Arena, Mackay
Umpires: Claire Polosak and Nathan James
Player of the match: Ellyse Perry (Sydney Sixers)

- Sydney Sixers won the toss and elected to field.
- Broadcast by Seven Network and Foxtel

Match 3
15 October 2022
15:40
Scorecard

Sydney Sixers; 2/151 (20 overs)	v	Adelaide Strikers; 9/134 (20 overs)
Suzie Bates 82* (67); Darcie Brown 1/20 (4 overs)		Katie Mack 34 (32); Sophie Ecclestone 4/17 (4 overs)

Sydney Sixers won by 17 runs
Great Barrier Reef Arena, Mackay
Umpires: Claire Polosak and Nathan James
Player of the match: Suzie Bates (Sydney Sixers)

- Sydney Sixers won the toss and elected to bat.
- Broadcast by Seven Network and Foxtel

Match 6
16 October 2022
13:40
Scorecard

Sydney Sixers; 6/147 (20 overs)	v	Melbourne Stars; 9/120 (20 overs)
Alyssa Healy 43 (32); Kim Garth 2/21 (4 overs)		Bess Heath 37 (30); Maitlan Brown 3/25 (4 overs)

Sydney Sixers won by 27 runs
Great Barrier Reef Arena, Mackay
Umpires: Michael Mellifont and Sue Redfern
Player of the match: Ashleigh Gardner (Sydney Sixers)

- Melbourne Stars won the toss and elected to field.
- Broadcast by Seven Network and Foxtel

Match 13
21 October 2022
15:25
Scorecard

Adelaide Strikers; 6/142 (20 overs)	v	Sydney Sixers; 8/139 (20 overs)
Madeline Penna 39* (25); Sophie Ecclestone 2/15 (4 overs)		Erin Burns 71 (38); Darcie Brown 3/17 (4 overs)

Adelaide Strikers won by 3 runs
Karen Rolton Oval, Adelaide
Umpires: Harsimran Singh and Kurt Miegel
Player of the match: Erin Burns (Sydney Sixers)

- Sydney Sixers won the toss and elected to field.
- Broadcast by cricket.com.au and Foxtel
- Ellyse Perry (Sydney Sixers) became the first player to captain 100 WBBL games.

Match 21
29 October 2022
10:15
Scorecard

Hobart Hurricanes; 8/95 (12 overs)	v	Sydney Sixers; 2/96 (10.5 overs)
Mignon du Preez 26 (19); Ashleigh Gardner 4/23 (3 overs)		Ashleigh Gardner 43 (22); Molly Strano 1/16 (3 overs)

Sydney Sixers won by 8 wickets (with 7 balls remaining)
Eastern Oval, Ballarat
Umpires: Chris Grant and Greg Azzopardi
Player of the match: Ashleigh Gardner (Sydney Sixers)

- Sydney Sixers won the toss and elected to field.
- Match reduced to 12 overs due to rain.
- Broadcast by cricket.com.au and Foxtel

Match 24
30 October 2022
15:00
Scorecard

Sydney Sixers; 3/188 (20 overs)	v	Melbourne Renegades; 9/151 (20 overs)
Alyssa Healy 78 (54); Sophie Molineux 2/38 (4 overs)		Carly Leeson 52 (32); Maitlan Brown 3/16 (4 overs)

Sydney Sixers won by 37 runs
Eastern Oval, Ballarat
Umpires: Daryl Brigham and Gaurav Bawa
Player of the match: Alyssa Healy (Sydney Sixers)

- Melbourne Renegades won the toss and elected to field.
- Broadcast by cricket.com.au and Foxtel

Match 27
2 November 2022
19:05 (N)
Scorecard

Sydney Sixers; 6/163 (20 overs)	v	Sydney Thunder; 7/148 (20 overs)
Ashleigh Gardner 53 (37); Lauren Smith 2/22 (3 overs)		Rachael Haynes 37 (29); Lauren Cheatle 3/21 (4 overs)

Sydney Sixers won by 15 runs
North Sydney Oval, Sydney
Umpires: Andrew Hamilton and Roberto Howard
Player of the match: Ashleigh Gardner (Sydney Sixers)

- Sydney Sixers won the toss and elected to bat.
- Broadcast by cricket.com.au and Foxtel
- Venue changed from Blacktown ISP Oval to North Sydney Oval

Match 31
5 November 2022
16:25
Scorecard

Sydney Sixers; 5/155 (20 overs)	v	Perth Scorchers; 1/158 (18.3 overs)
Ellyse Perry 69* (58); Alana King 3/27 (4 overs)		Beth Mooney 99* (58); Ashleigh Gardner 1/19 (4 overs)

Perth Scorchers won by 9 wickets (with 9 balls remaining)
Lilac Hill Park, Perth
Umpires: Jamie Thomas and Trent Steenholdt
Player of the match: Beth Mooney (Perth Scorchers)

- Sydney Sixers won the toss and elected to bat.
- Broadcast by cricket.com.au and Foxtel

Match 37
10 November 2022
15:00
Scorecard

Melbourne Renegades; 1/64 (11 overs)	v	Sydney Sixers
Hayley Matthews 40 (41); Ashleigh Gardner 1/21 (3 overs)

No result
CitiPower Centre, Melbourne
Umpires: Chris Grant and Greg Azzopardi

- Sydney Sixers won the toss and elected to field.
- No further play was possible due to rain.
- Broadcast by cricket.com.au and Foxtel

Match 40
12 November 2022
13:40
Scorecard

Sydney Sixers; 9/160 (20 overs)	v	Melbourne Stars; 115 (19.2 overs)
Alyssa Healy 31 (28); Kim Garth 2/9 (3 overs)		Kim Garth 18 (21); Ashleigh Gardner 4/27 (4 overs)

Sydney Sixers won by 45 runs
CitiPower Centre, Melbourne
Umpires: Lisa McCabe and Stephen Dionysius
Player of the match: Ashleigh Gardner (Sydney Sixers)

- Melbourne Stars won the toss and elected to field.
- Broadcast by Seven Network and Foxtel

Match 42
13 November 2022
10:15
Scorecard

Perth Scorchers; 4/176 (20 overs)	v	Sydney Sixers; 4/180 (20 overs)
Beth Mooney 75* (51); Ashleigh Gardner 2/30 (4 overs)		Alyssa Healy 107* (64); Sophie Devine 2/29 (4 overs)

Sydney Sixers won by 6 wickets (with 0 balls remaining)
CitiPower Centre, Melbourne
Umpires: Daryl Brigham and David Taylor
Player of the match: Alyssa Healy (Sydney Sixers)

- Sydney Sixers won the toss and elected to field.
- Broadcast by Seven Network and Foxtel

Match 49
16 November 2022
19:10 (N)
Scorecard

Brisbane Heat; 5/163 (20 overs)	v	Sydney Sixers; 5/164 (19.3 overs)
Jess Jonassen 38* (21); Kate Peterson 4/17 (4 overs)		Erin Burns 51* (32); Jess Kerr 1/29 (4 overs)

Sydney Sixers won by 5 wickets (with 3 balls remaining)
North Sydney Oval, Sydney
Umpires: Andrew Hamilton and Bede Sajowitz
Player of the match: Erin Burns (Sydney Sixers)

- Sydney Sixers won the toss and elected to field.
- Broadcast by cricket.com.au and Foxtel

Match 51
18 November 2022
19:05 (N)
Scorecard

Sydney Sixers; 6/178 (20 overs)	v	Sydney Thunder; 7/160 (20 overs)
Ashleigh Gardner 85 (48); Samantha Bates 3/21 (4 overs)		Tammy Beaumont 51 (32); Kate Peterson 3/27 (4 overs)

Sydney Sixers won by 18 runs
North Sydney Oval, Sydney
Umpires: Claire Polosak and Roberto Howard
Player of the match: Ashleigh Gardner (Sydney Sixers)

- Sydney Thunder won the toss and elected to field.
- Broadcast by Seven Network and Foxtel

Match 54
20 November 2022
13:40
Scorecard

Hobart Hurricanes; 156 (19.5 overs)	v	Sydney Sixers; 2/157 (18.5 overs)
Mignon du Preez 38 (29); Kate Peterson 3/31 (4 overs)		Ellyse Perry 56* (39); Ruth Johnston 1/30 (3.5 overs)

Sydney Sixers won by 8 wickets (with 7 balls remaining)
North Sydney Oval, Sydney
Umpires: Bede Sajowitz and Sharad Patel
Player of the match: Ellyse Perry (Sydney Sixers)

- Sydney Sixers won the toss and elected to field.
- Broadcast by Seven Network and Foxtel

=== Final ===
26 November 2022
17:20 (D/N)
Scorecard

Adelaide Strikers; 5/147 (20 overs)	v	Sydney Sixers; 137 (20 overs)
Deandra Dottin 52* (37); Sophie Ecclestone 2/19 (4 overs)		Maitlan Brown 34 (17); Darcie Brown 2/15 (4 overs)

Adelaide Strikers won by 10 runs
North Sydney Oval, Sydney
Attendance: 6,478
Umpires: Claire Polosak and Eloise Sheridan
Player of the match: Deandra Dottin (Adelaide Strikers)

- Adelaide Strikers won the toss and elected to bat.
- Broadcast by Seven Network and Foxtel
- Former Australian player Nicole Bolton (Sydney Sixers) made her last WBBL appearance.
- Adelaide Strikers won their first WBBL title.

== Statistics and awards ==
- Most runs: Ellyse Perry – 408 (2nd in the league)
- Highest score in an innings: Alyssa Healy – 107* (64) vs Perth Scorchers, 13 November 2022
- Most wickets: Ashleigh Gardner – 23 (equal 3rd in the league)
- Best bowling figures in an innings:
  - Sophie Ecclestone – 4/17 (4 overs) vs Adelaide Strikers, 15 October 2022
  - Kate Peterson – 4/17 (4 overs) vs Brisbane Heat, 16 November 2022
- Most catches (fielder): Ellyse Perry – 15 (1st in the league)
- Player of the Match awards:
  - Ashleigh Gardner – 5
  - Erin Burns, Alyssa Healy, Ellyse Perry – 2 each
  - Suzie Bates – 1
- WBBL|08 Player of the Tournament: Ashleigh Gardner (1st), Ellyse Perry (5th), Alyssa Healy (equal 6th)
- WBBL|08 Team of the Tournament: Erin Burns, Ashleigh Gardner, Alyssa Healy
- Sydney Sixers Player of the Season: Ashleigh Gardner
