= Merrilees =

Merrilees may refer to

- Merrilees Parker (born 1971), British television presenter
- Duncan Merrilees (1922–2009), Australian geologist, palaeontologist and lecturer
- Kieran Merrilees (born 1989), Scottish badminton player
- Meg Merrilees, fictional character in Guy Mannering (1815)
- Peta Merrilees (born 1982), Australian cricketer
- William Merrilees (1898–1984), Scottish policeman
