= Chelsea Moscript =

Australian cricketer

Personal information
- Full name: Chelsea Moscript
- Born: 4 October 1995 (age 31)
- Batting: Left-handed
- Bowling: Right-arm leg break
- Role: All-rounder

Domestic team information
- Years: Team
- 2023/24–present: Australian Capital Territory

Career statistics
Competition	WLA	WT20
Matches	2	4
Runs scored	8	0
Batting average	4.00	–
100s/50s	0/0	0/0
Top score	7	0*
Balls bowled	44	66
Wickets	1	2
Bowling average	55.00	41.50
5 wickets in innings	0	0
10 wickets in match	0	0
Best bowling	1/34	1/29
Catches/stumpings	0/–	1/–
- Source: CricketArchive, 15 December 2023

Chelsea Moscript (born 4 October 1995) is an Australian cricketer who currently plays for Australian Capital Territory in the Women's National Cricket League (WNCL). She plays as a left-handed batter and right-arm leg break bowler.

== Domestic career ==
In 2014, Moscript played for Cricket Without Borders at the ICC East Asia-Pacific Women's Championship, and was both the side's leading run-scorer and joint-leading wicket-taker, with 101 runs and 5 wickets. She again appeared for the side at the East Asia-Pacific Regional Qualifier for the 2017 Women's Cricket World Cup.

In October 2023, Moscript made her debut for Australian Capital Territory in a WNCL match against Tasmania, scoring one run and taking one wicket.
