= Emmerson Filsell =

Australian cricketer

Personal information
- Full name: Emmerson L Filsell
- Born: 15 January 2005 (age 21); Adelaide, South Australia
- Batting: Right-handed
- Bowling: Right-arm fast-medium
- Role: Bowler

Domestic team information
- Years: Team
- 2024/25–present: South Australia (squad no. 24)
- 2024/25–present: Adelaide Strikers (squad no. 24)

Career statistics
Competition	WLA	WT20
Matches	1	3
Runs scored	0	0
Batting average	–	–
100s/50s	0/0	0/0
Top score	–	–
Balls bowled	30	18
Wickets	0	1
Bowling average	–	36.00
5 wickets in innings	0	0
10 wickets in match	–	–
Best bowling	–	1/16
Catches/stumpings	0/–	0/–
- Source: CricketArchive, 20 October 2024

Emmerson L Filsell (born 15 January 2005) is an Australian cricketer who plays for South Australia and for the Adelaide Strikers. She plays as a right-arm fast-medium bowler and a right-handed batter.

== Domestic career ==
In June 2024, Filsell was added to the South Australia women's squad for the 2024/25 season following performances for Kensington in South Australian Premier Cricket and for South Australia at the Under-19 National Championships. On 29 September 2024, she made her List A debut against the Australian Capital Territory.

On 11 October 2024, she made her T20 debut for the Strikers in the T20 Spring Challenge against the Perth Scorchers.
