= Aanliya Cheeran =

Australian cricketer

Personal information
- Full name: Aanliya Cheeran
- Born: 1 April 2005 (age 21)
- Batting: Right-handed
- Bowling: Right-arm off break
- Role: Bowler

Domestic team information
- Years: Team
- 2023/24–present: Victoria

Career statistics
Competition	WLA
Matches	2
Runs scored	5
Batting average	5.00
100s/50s	0/0
Top score	5
Balls bowled	58
Wickets	1
Bowling average	48.00
5 wickets in innings	0
10 wickets in match	0
Best bowling	1/25
Catches/stumpings	0/–
- Source: CricketArchive, 18 December 2023

Aanliya Cheeran (born 1 April 2005) is an Australian cricketer who currently plays for Victoria in the Women's National Cricket League (WNCL). She plays as a right-arm off break bowler.

== Domestic career ==
In December 2022, Cheeran played for Victoria Country Under-19s at the Under-19 National Championships, taking five wickets at an average of 28.40.

In October 2023, Cheeran made her debut for Victoria in a WNCL match against Queensland, taking 1/25 from her 5.4 overs.
