= Grace Lyons =

Grace Lyons may refer to:

- Grace Lyons (cricketer) (born 2005), Australian cricketer
- Grace Turk, formerly Grace Lyons (born 1999), American softball player
