= List of Italy women Twenty20 International cricketers =

This is a list of Italy women Twenty20 International cricketers. A Women's Twenty20 International (WT20I) is an international cricket match between two representative teams. A T20I is played under the rules of Twenty20 cricket. In April 2018, the International Cricket Council (ICC) granted full international status to Twenty20 women's matches played between member sides from 1 July 2018 onwards. Italy women played their first WT20I on 9 August during a home series against Austria.

The list is arranged in the order in which each player won her first Twenty20 cap. Where more than one player won her first Twenty20 cap in the same match, those players are listed alphabetically by surname.

== Key ==
General

- ‡ – Captain
- † – Wicket-keeper
- First – Year of debut
- Last – Year of latest game
- Mat – Number of matches played

Batting

- Runs – Runs scored in career
- HS – Highest score
- Avg – Runs scored per dismissal
- * – Batsman remained not out
- 50 – Number of half centuries

Bowling

- Balls – Balls bowled in career
- Wkt – Wickets taken in career
- BBI – Best bowling in an innings
- Ave – Average runs per wicket

Fielding

- Ca – Catches taken
- St – Stumpings affected

== Players ==
Statistics are correct as of 1 May 2026.

Italy women T20I cricketers
General					Batting				Bowling				Fielding		Ref
No.	Name	First	Last	Mat	Runs	HS	Avg	50	Balls	Wkt	BBI	Ave	Ca	St	Ref
1	Teshani Araliya	2021	2025	26	97	25*	13.85	0	236	8	1/7	33.25	4	0	
2	Rashini Aththidi†	2019	2021	5	8	8*	–	0	–	–	–	–	4	0	
3	Gayathri Batagoda	2021	2023	17	65	16	7.22	0	–	–	–	–	2	0	
4	Niroshni Diminguwarige	2021	2021	4	5	4*	5.00	0	–	–	–	–	0	0	
5	Sewmini Kanankege	2021	2026	42	62	16*	6.20	0	517	20	2/6	23.35	9	0	
6	Sadalee Malwatta	2021	2026	27	46	18	4.18	0	112	4	2/11	30.50	4	0	
7	Dilaisha Nanayakkara	2021	2026	52	428	86	10.97	0	679	26	3/19	25.15	9	0	
8	Kumudu Peddrick‡	2021	2026	48	479	62	17.10	2	656	34	4/10	16.88	16	0	
9	Dayana Samarasunghe	2021	2022	6	12	7*	12.00	0	–	–	–	–	0	0	
10	Dishani Samarawickrama	2021	2023	15	111	33	15.85	0	180	12	2/9	12.16	2	0	
11	Sharon Withanage†	2021	2023	25	575	64*	26.13	5	295	20	3/5	13.45	6	0	
12	Sarah Sabelli	2021	2021	1	–	–	–	–	6	0	–	–	0	0	
13	Francesca Vaccarella	2021	2021	1	0	0	0.00	0	–	–	–	–	0	0	
14	Nipuni Ponnanperumage	2021	2021	1	–	–	–	–	–	–	–	–	0	0	
15	Nimesha Ekanayake	2022	2025	32	12	5*	4.00	0	258	8	1/6	33.50	5	0	
16	Chathurika Mahamalage	2022	2025	52	585	53*	19.50	1	1018	50	4/17	17.68	6	0	
17	Methnara Rathnayake†	2022	2026	48	611	81	16.97	3	–	–	–	–	21	19	
18	Sonia Toffoletto	2022	2026	17	9	6*	4.50	0	1	0	–	–	2	0	
19	Kirandeep Kaur	2022	2024	11	2	2	1.00	0	18	0	–	–	2	0	
20	Anusha Landage	2022	2022	5	–	–	–	–	–	–	–	–	0	0	
21	Emilia Bartram‡	2022	2026	46	627	79	21.62	3	625	27	3/6	21.29	22	0	
22	Anne Warnakulasuriya	2022	2023	7	43	23*	14.33	0	–	–	–	–	0	0	
23	Regina Suddahazai	2023	2023	11	91	26*	18.20	0	213	8	3/8	23.75	1	0	
24	Himanshi Daluwatta	2024	2026	11	16	6*	5.33	0	55	2	1/3	45.50	3	0	
25	Ilenia Sims	2024	2026	31	550	61*	28.94	2	551	36	3/0	14.36	3	0	
26	Ishara Jayamannage†	2024	2025	5	0	0*	–	0	–	–	–	–	1	1	
27	Emma Moore	2024	2026	25	116	43	11.60	0	281	11	2/13	26.36	6	0	
28	Luana Sims	2024	2024	8	20	13	10.00	0	90	8	3/7	9.12	4	0	
29	Alexia Kontopirakis	2025	2026	16	222	49	18.50	0	102	2	1/14	52.00	5	0	
30	Chloe Piparo	2025	2025	11	305	74*	43.57	1	6	0	–	–	7	0	
31	Annie Wikman	2025	2025	11	175	53	25.00	1	31	0	–	–	3	0	
32	Amaya Rajapaksha	2025	2026	10	9	8	4.50	0	66	1	1/18	80.00	0	0	
