= 2023–24 Women's National Cricket League season =

Cricket tournament

Women's National Cricket League 2023–24 season
- Dates: 22 September 2023 – 24 February 2024
- Administrator(s): Cricket Australia
- Cricket format: Limited overs cricket (50 overs)
- Tournament format(s): Double round-robin and final
- Champions: Tasmania (3rd title)
- Participants: 7
- Matches: 43
- Most runs: (Tasmania) Nicola Carey (696)
- Most wickets: (Queensland) Grace Parsons (20)
- Official website: cricket.com.au

The 2023–24 Women's National Cricket League season was the 28th season of the Women's National Cricket League, the women's domestic limited overs cricket competition in Australia. The tournament ran from 22 September 2023 to 23 February 2024. Seven teams competed in a double round-robin tournament. Tasmania were the defending champions.

== Ladder ==
Pos	Team	Pld	W	L	T	MA	BP	Pts	NRR
1	Tasmania	12	9	2	0	1	5	43	0.980
2	Queensland	12	8	3	0	1	7	41	1.224
3	Victoria	12	7	5	0	0	4	32	0.013
4	Western Australia	12	6	6	0	0	4	28	−0.113
5	New South Wales	12	6	6	0	0	2	26	−0.105
6	South Australia	12	4	8	0	0	3	19	−0.063
7	Australian Capital Territory	12	1	11	0	0	0	4	−2.006

Updated to match(es) played on 17 February 2024. Source: ESPN Cricinfo cricket.com.au
Rules for classification: The top two ranked teams will qualify for the final.
- Point system: 4 for a win, 2 each for a tie/no result/abandoned match, 0 for a loss
- Bonus point system: 1 for a win with a run rate 1.25 times that of the opposition

== Fixtures ==
Match 1
22 September 2023
9:30
Scorecard

Queensland; 182 (46.3 overs)	v	New South Wales; 5/183 (36.2 overs)
Georgia Voll 65 (94); Erin Burns 4/31 (10 overs)		Ashleigh Gardner 54 (56); Courtney Sippel 2/25 (5 overs)

New South Wales won by 5 wickets
Cricket Central, Sydney
Umpires: Andrew Hamilton and Mitch Claydon
Player of the match: Erin Burns (New South Wales)

- Queensland won the toss and elected to bat.
- Points: New South Wales 5, Queensland 0

Match 2
22 September 2023
10:00
Scorecard

Australian Capital Territory; 219 (50 overs)	v	South Australia; 3/220 (38.4 overs)
Katie Mack 95* (102); Jemma Barsby 5/20 (10 overs)		Emma de Broughe 77 (95); Jannatul Ferdus 1/27 (5 overs)

South Australia won by 7 wickets
Karen Rolton Oval, Adelaide
Umpires: Dhaval Bhatt and Peter George
Player of the match: Jemma Barsby (South Australia)

- South Australia won the toss and elected to field.
- Points: South Australia 5, Australian Capital Territory 0

Match 3
24 September 2023
9:30
Scorecard

Queensland; 9/215 (50 overs)	v	New South Wales; 136 (36.5 overs)
Georgia Redmayne 61 (87); Ashleigh Gardner 3/40 (10 overs)		Tahlia Wilson 27 (36); Courtney Sippel 3/28 (7 overs)

Queensland won by 79 runs
Cricket Central, Sydney
Umpires: Mitch Claydon and Andrew Hamilton
Player of the match: Georgia Redmayne (Queensland)

- Queensland won the toss and elected to bat.
- Points: Queensland 5, New South Wales 0

Match 4
24 September 2023
10:00
Scorecard

South Australia; 7/262 (50 overs)	v	Australian Capital Territory; 166 (39.5 overs)
Courtney Webb 76 (78); Holly Ferling 4/54 (10 overs)		Annie Wikman 35 (39); Amanda-Jade Wellington 3/32 (8 overs)

South Australia won by 101 runs
Karen Rolton Oval, Adelaide
Umpires: Harsimran Singh and Eloise Sheridan
Player of the match: Courtney Webb (South Australia)

- South Australia won the toss and elected to bat.
- Points: South Australia 5, Australian Capital Territory 0

Match 5
26 September 2023
10:00
Scorecard

Victoria; 176 (47.2 overs)	v	Western Australia; 2/177 (35.1 overs)
Meg Lanning 51 (48); Zoe Britcliffe 3/25 (8 overs)		Chloe Piparo 98* (115); Kim Garth 2/36 (8 overs)

Western Australia won by 8 wickets
WACA Ground, Perth
Umpires: A Khan and Ashlee Gibbons
Player of the match: Chloe Piparo (Western Australia)

- Western Australia won the toss and elected to field.
- Points: Western Australia 5, Victoria 0

Match 6
28 September 2023
10:00
Scorecard

Victoria; 164 (47.5 overs)	v	Western Australia; 2/165 (35.1 overs)
Meg Lanning 35 (30); Alana King 4/32 (8.5 overs)		Maddy Darke 76* (100); Kim Garth 1/28 (8 overs)

Western Australia won by 8 wickets
WACA Ground, Perth
Umpires: Jamie Thomas and Jarryd Buscall
Player of the match: Alana King (Western Australia)

- Victoria won the toss and elected to bat.
- Points: Western Australia 5, Victoria 0

Match 7
8 October 2023
10:00
Scorecard

Tasmania; 8/303 (50 overs)	v	Australian Capital Territory; 183 (42.4 overs)
Nicola Carey 90 (93); Jannatul Ferdus 2/57 (10 overs)		Rebecca Carter 49 (68); Amy Smith 2/24 (4 overs)

Tasmania won by 120 runs
Phillip Oval, Canberra
Umpires: Doug Toyne and Frederick Miller
Player of the match: Nicola Carey (Tasmania)

- Australian Capital Territory won the toss and elected to field.
- Points: Tasmania 5, Australian Capital Territory 0

Match 8
10 October 2023
10:00
Scorecard

Australian Capital Territory; 147 (41.1 overs)	v	Tasmania; 4/150 (24.2 overs)
Olivia Porter 51 (83); Molly Strano 4/32 (10 overs)		Lizelle Lee 77 (71); Katie Mack 3/16 (4 overs)

Tasmania won by 6 wickets
Phillip Oval, Canberra
Umpires: Doug Toyne and Frederick Miller
Player of the match: Molly Strano (Tasmania)

- Australian Capital Territory won the toss and elected to bat.
- Points: Tasmania 5, Australian Capital Territory 0

Match 9
10 October 2023
9:30
Scorecard

Queensland; 7/263 (50 overs)	v	Victoria; 98 (24.2 overs)
Grace Harris 63 (53); Rhiann O'Donnell 2/33 (7 overs)		Meg Lanning 51 (47); Courtney Sippel 4/15 (4.2 overs)

Queensland won by 165 runs
Peter Burge Oval, Brisbane
Umpires: Riki Wessels (Eng) and T Logan (Aus)
Player of the match: Grace Harris (Queensland)

- Victoria won the toss and elected to field.
- Points: Queensland 5, Victoria 0

Match 10
10 October 2023
10:00
Scorecard

South Australia; 9/263 (50 overs)	v	Western Australia; 176 (46.3 overs)
Amanda-Jade Wellington 73 (58); Amy Edgar 4/38 (10 overs)		Maddy Darke 55 (68); Kate Peterson 3/26 (8 overs)

South Australia won by 87 runs
Karen Rolton Oval, Adelaide
Umpires: Harry Singh and James Cushway
Player of the match: Amanda-Jade Wellington (South Australia)

- South Australia won the toss and elected to bat.
- Points: South Australia 5, Western Australia 0

Match 11
12 October 2023
10:00
Scorecard

South Australia; 4/259 (50 overs)	v	Western Australia; 7/261 (48.2 overs)
Bridget Patterson 102 (121); Piepa Cleary 3/44 (10 overs)		Chloe Piparo 104 (112); Madeline Penna 1/25 (5 overs)

Western Australia won by 3 wickets
Karen Rolton Oval, Adelaide
Umpires: Andrew Crozier and Kurt Miegel
Player of the match: Chloe Piparo (Western Australia)

- South Australia won the toss and elected to bat.
- Points: Western Australia 4, South Australia 0

Match 12
12 October 2023
9:30
Scorecard

Victoria; 167 (39 overs)	v	Queensland; 7/168 (38.4 overs)
Meg Lanning 73* (71); Courtney Sippel 4/40 (8 overs)		Charli Knott 45 (60); Milly Illingworth 3/29 (7 overs)

Queensland won by 3 wickets
Peter Burge Oval, Brisbane
Umpires: Benjamin Farrell and M Mellifont
Player of the match: Charli Knott (Queensland)

- Victoria won the toss and elected to bat.
- Points: Queensland 5, Victoria 0

Match 13
12 December 2023
10:00
Scorecard

Australian Capital Territory; 9/247 (50 overs)	v	Queensland; 2/248 (39.5 overs)
Katie Mack 66 (72); Grace Harris 3/29 (8 overs)		Georgia Redmayne 112 (102); Carly Leeson 1/53 (10 overs)

Queensland won by 8 wickets
Phillip Oval, Canberra
Umpires: Doug Toyne and Syed Humayun
Player of the match: Georgia Redmayne (Queensland)

- Australian Capital Territory won the toss and elected to bat.
- Points: Queensland 5, Australian Capital Territory 0

Match 14
12 December 2023
14:00 (D/N)
Scorecard

Tasmania; 8/274 (50 overs)	v	South Australia; 162 (41 overs)
Nicola Carey 113 (125); Amanda-Jade Wellington 4/50 (10 overs)		Josephine Dooley 57 (80); Molly Strano 5/30 (10 overs)

Tasmania won by 112 runs
Bellerive Oval, Hobart
Umpires: Craig Seabourne and Sam Burns
Player of the match: Nicola Carey (Tasmania)

- South Australia won the toss and elected to field.
- Points: Tasmania 5, South Australia 0

Match 15
14 December 2023
10:00
Scorecard

Australian Capital Territory; 157 (42.5 overs)	v	Queensland; 1/158 (29.1 overs)
Olivia Porter 31 (53); Charli Knott 3/25 (6.5 overs)		Georgia Voll 69* (86); Holly Ferling 1/24 (6 overs)

Queensland won by 9 wickets
Phillip Oval, Canberra
Umpires: Doug Toyne and Syed Humayun
Player of the match: Zoe Cooke (Queensland)

- Australian Capital Territory won the toss and elected to bat.
- Points: Queensland 5, Australian Capital Territory 0

Match 16
14 December 2023
10:30
Scorecard

South Australia; 9/223 (50 overs)	v	Tasmania; 8/224 (48.2 overs)
Jemma Barsby 61 (64); Nicola Carey 2/31 (6 overs)		Amy Smith 57 (88); Courtney Neale 3/31 (10 overs)

Tasmania won by 2 wickets
Bellerive Oval, Hobart
Umpires: Muhammad Qureshi and Simon Burns
Player of the match: Molly Strano (Tasmania)

- Tasmania won the toss and elected to field.
- Points: Tasmania 4, South Australia 0

Match 17
19 December 2023
10:00
Scorecard

New South Wales; 202 (45.5 overs)	v	Victoria; 3/206 (39 overs)
Claire Moore 59 (79); Sophie Day 3/27 (10 overs)		Sophie Reid 95* (95); Sarah Coyte 1/29 (9 overs)

Victoria won by 7 wickets
Junction Oval, St Kilda, Melbourne
Umpires: Lisa McCabe and Mattis van Eck
Player of the match: Sophie Reid (Victoria)

- Victoria won the toss and elected to field.
- Match was reduced to 47 overs per side due to rain.
- Points: Victoria 4, New South Wales 0

Match 18
21 December 2023
10:00
Scorecard

Victoria; 7/284 (50 overs)	v	New South Wales; 224 (45.5 overs)
Sophie Reid 65 (78); Sammy-Jo Johnson 3/42 (10 overs)		Saskia Horley 89 (111); Sophie Molineux 6/45 (9.5 overs)

Victoria won by 60 runs
Junction Oval, St Kilda, Melbourne
Umpires: Clare Haysom and Daryl Brigham
Player of the match: Sophie Molineux (Victoria)

- Victoria won the toss and elected to bat.
- Points: Victoria 5, New South Wales 0

Match 19
5 January 2024
10:00
Scorecard

New South Wales; 9/197 (50 overs)	v	Tasmania; 6/200 (35.5 overs)
Tahlia Wilson 41 (59); Amy Smith 5/33 (7 overs)		Naomi Stalenberg 67* (77); Sarah Coyte 3/21 (4 overs)

Tasmania won by 4 wickets
Cricket Central, Sydney
Umpires: Andrew Hamilton and Daniel Moran
Player of the match: Amy Smith (Tasmania)

- New South Wales won the toss and elected to bat.
- Points: Tasmania 5, New South Wales 0

Match 20
5 January 2024
9:30
Scorecard

South Australia; 231 (50 overs)	v	Queensland; 7/232 (43 overs)
Emma de Broughe 90 (120); Zoe Cooke 5/31 (8 overs)		Georgia Redmayne 55 (64); Madeline Penna 2/12 (4 overs)

Queensland won by 3 wickets
Allan Border Field, Brisbane
Umpires: Joshua Adie and T Logan
Player of the match: Zoe Cooke (Queensland)

- Queensland won the toss and elected to field.
- Points: Queensland 4, South Australia 0
- Zoe Cooke (Queensland) took a hat-trick in the final three balls of the South Australia innings.

Match 21
5 January 2024
14:00 (D/N)
Scorecard

Australian Capital Territory; 151 (39.3 overs)	v	Western Australia; 1/152 (21.5 overs)
Rebecca Carter 22 (42); Amy Edgar 3/19 (8 overs)		Maddy Darke 60* (68); Grace Dignam 1/27 (3.5 overs)

Western Australia won by 9 wickets
WACA Ground, Perth
Umpires: A Khan and D Smallwood
Player of the match: Amy Edgar (Western Australia)

- Australian Capital Territory won the toss and elected to bat.
- Western Australia 5, South Australia 0

Match 22
7 January 2024
10:00
Scorecard

New South Wales; 5/274 (50 overs)	v	Tasmania; 7/276 (49.1 overs)
Erin Burns 107* (65); Lauren Smith 1/38 (6 overs)		Nicola Carey 58 (67); Lauren Cheatle 3/51 (8.1 overs)

Tasmania won by 3 wickets
Cricket Central, Sydney
Umpires: Andrew Hamilton and Daniel Moran
Player of the match: Erin Burns (New South Wales)

- New South Wales won the toss and elected to bat.
- Points: Tasmania 4, New South Wales 0

Match 23
7 January 2024
9:30
Scorecard

Queensland; 9/205 (50 overs)	v	South Australia; 6/206 (40.5 overs)
Mikayla Hinkley 50 (108); Jemma Barsby 3/34 (8 overs)		Josephine Dooley 86 (96); Charli Knott 2/37 (6 overs)

South Australia won by 4 wickets
Allan Border Field, Brisbane
Umpires: B Farrell and M Mellifont
Player of the match: Josephine Dooley (South Australia)

- Queensland won the toss and elected to bat.
- South Australia 4, Queensland 0.

Match 24
7 January 2024
14:00 (D/N)
Scorecard

Australian Capital Territory; 171 (38.3 overs)	v	Western Australia; 0/174 (25 overs)
Carly Leeson 50 (70); Taneale Peschel 3/33 (10 overs)		Chloe Piparo 79* (84)

Western Australia won by 10 wickets
WACA Ground, Perth
Umpires: Ahmad Khan and D Smallwood
Player of the match: Chloe Piparo (Western Australia)

- Australian Capital Territory won the toss and elected to bat.
- Points: Western Australia 5, Australian Capital Territory 0

Match 25
15 January 2024
10:30
Scorecard

Tasmania; 4/294 (50 overs)	v	Queensland; 250 (47 overs)
Lizelle Lee 97 (90); Grace Parsons 2/40 (6 overs)		Mikayla Hinkley 49 (70); Sasha Moloney 2/34 (6 overs)

Tasmania won by 44 runs
Bellerive Oval, Hobart
Umpires: Craig Seabourne and Simon Burns
Player of the match: Lizelle Lee (Tasmania)

- Queensland won the toss and elected to field.
- Points: Tasmania 4, Queensland 0

Match 26
16 January 2024
10:00
Scorecard

Australian Capital Territory; 195 (46.4 overs)	v	Victoria; 1/196 (27.5 overs)
Carly Leeson 36 (46); Ella Hayward 4/21 (6.4 overs)		Meg Lanning 80* (60); Alisha Bates 1/12 (2 overs)

Victoria won by 9 wickets
Junction Oval, St Kilda, Melbourne
Umpires: Clare Haysom and Mattis van Eck
Player of the match: Nicole Faltum (Victoria)

- Victoria won the toss and elected to field.
- Points: Victoria 5, Australian Capital Territory 0

Match 27
17 January 2024
14:00 (D/N)
Scorecard

Tasmania; 5/182 (26.5 overs)	v	Queensland
Elyse Villani 71 (48); Lucy Hamilton 2/30 (5 overs)

No result
Bellerive Oval, Hobart
Umpires: Muhammad Qureshi and Simon Burns

- Queensland won the toss and elected to field.
- Match was reduced to 30 overs per side due to rain.
- No further play was possible due to rain.
- Points: Tasmania 2, Queensland 2

Match 28
18 January 2024
10:00
Scorecard

Victoria; 5/354 (50 overs)	v	Australian Capital Territory; 9/262 (50 overs)
Ellyse Perry 145 (137); Grace Dignam 1/29 (7 overs)		Katie Mack 140* (129); Milly Illingworth 2/32 (6 overs)

Victoria won by 92 runs
Junction Oval, St Kilda, Melbourne
Umpires: Clare Haysom and Gaurav Bawa
Player of the match: Ellyse Perry (Victoria)

- Victoria won the toss and elected to bat.
- Points: Victoria 5, Australian Capital Territory 0

Match 29
19 January 2024
14:00 (D/N)
Scorecard

New South Wales; 153 (42.2 overs)	v	Western Australia; 134 (36.1 overs)
Tahlia Wilson 36 (48); Lilly Mills 4/28 (10 overs)		Amy Edgar 51 (66); Erin Burns 4/38 (10 overs)

New South Wales won by 19 runs
WACA Ground, Perth
Umpires: Jamie Thomas and Kate Holloman
Player of the match: Erin Burns (New South Wales)

- New South Wales won the toss and elected to bat.
- Points: New South Wales 4, Western Australia 0

Match 30
21 January 2024
14:00 (D/N)
Scorecard

Western Australia; 5/237 (50 overs)	v	New South Wales; 5/238 (45.3 overs)
Mathilda Carmichael 104 (126); Sarah Coyte 2/35 (10 overs)		Anika Learoyd 91 (116); Piepa Cleary 2/46 (10 overs)

New South Wales won by 5 wickets
WACA Ground, Perth
Umpires: Jarryd Buscall and Kate Holloman
Player of the match: Anika Learoyd (New South Wales)

- Western Australia won the toss and elected to bat.
- Points: New South Wales 4, Western Australia 0

Match 31
29 January 2024
14:00 (D/N)
Scorecard

South Australia; 210 (50 overs)	v	Victoria; 2/211 (36 overs)
Jemma Barsby 78 (101); Sophie Molineux 4/38 (10 overs)		Meg Lanning 82* (82); Amanda-Jade Wellington 1/36 (6 overs)

Victoria won by 8 wickets
Adelaide Oval, Adelaide
Umpires: Dhaval Bhatt and Kurt Miegel
Player of the match: Meg Lanning (Victoria)

- Victoria won the toss and elected to field.
- Points: Victoria 5, South Australia 0

Match 32
30 January 2024
10:00
Scorecard

New South Wales; 243 (50 overs)	v	Australian Capital Territory; 6/244 (46.1 overs)
Claire Moore 61 (96); Carly Leeson 3/32 (10 overs)		Katie Mack 74 (86); Lauren Cheatle 3/18 (9.1 overs)

Australian Capital Territory won by 4 wickets
Phillip Oval, Canberra
Umpires: Doug Toyne and Syed Humayun
Player of the match: Alisha Bates (Australian Capital Territory)

- Australian Capital Territory won the toss and elected to field.
- Points: Australian Capital Territory 4, New South Wales 0

Match 33
31 January 2024
10:00
Scorecard

South Australia; 231 (49.5 overs)	v	Victoria; 6/232 (47.4 overs)
Courtney Webb 75 (104); Sophie Day 4/42 (10 overs)		Sophie Reid 67 (80); Samantha Betts 3/37 (8.4 overs)

Victoria won by 4 wickets
Karen Rolton Oval
Umpires: James Cushway and Peter George
Player of the match: Sophie Reid (Victoria)

- Victoria won the toss and elected to field.
- Points: Victoria 4, South Australia 0

Match 34
1 February 2024
10:00
Scorecard

New South Wales; 8/281 (50 overs)	v	Australian Capital Territory; 247 (49.1 overs)
Saskia Horley 75 (92); Carly Leeson 3/44 (10 overs)		Carly Leeson 96 (99); Hannah Darlington 3/56 (9 overs)

New South Wales won by 34 runs
Phillip Oval, Canberra
Umpires: Paul Miller and Syed Humayun
Player of the match: Carly Leeson (Australian Capital Territory)

- New South Wales won the toss and elected to bat.
- Points: New South Wales 4, Australian Capital Territory 0

Match 35
1 February 2024
10:30
Scorecard

Western Australia; 9/248 (50 overs)	v	Tasmania; 212 (45.2 overs)
Amy Jones 42 (36); Hayley Silver-Holmes 3/26 (8 overs)		Heather Graham 61 (65); Lilly Mills 4/36 (10 overs)

Western Australia won by 36 runs
Bellerive Oval, Hobart
Umpires: Craig Seabourne and Sam Burns
Player of the match: Lilly Mills (Western Australia)

- Tasmania won the toss and elected to field.
- Points: Western Australia 4, Tasmania 0

Match 36
3 February 2024
10:30
Scorecard

Tasmania; 8/223 (50 overs)	v	Western Australia; 171 (43.5 overs)
Elyse Villani 59 (74); Lilly Mills 3/43 (10 overs)		Maddy Darke 73 (105); Heather Graham 3/29 (8.5 overs)

Tasmania won by 52 runs
Bellerive Oval, Hobart
Umpires: Muhammad Qureshi and Sam Burns
Player of the match: Heather Graham (Tasmania)

- Tasmania won the toss and elected to bat.
- Points: Tasmania 5, Western Australia 0

Match 37
12 February 2024
10:00
Scorecard

Victoria; 5/255 (50 overs)	v	Tasmania; 3/259 (43.4 overs)
Tess Flintoff 60 (92); Lauren Smith 2/38 (10 overs)		Heather Graham 105 (93); Milly Illingworth 1/33 (5 overs)

Tasmania won by 7 wickets
Junction Oval, St Kilda, Melbourne
Umpires: Gaurav Bawa and Lisa McCabe
Player of the match: Heather Graham (Tasmania)

- Tasmania won the toss and elected to field.
- Points: Tasmania 4, Victoria 0

Match 38
14 February 2024
10:00
Scorecard

Victoria; 9/268 (50 overs)	v	Tasmania; 244 (47.3 overs)
Nicole Faltum 86 (91); Nicola Carey 3/47 (10 overs)		Nicola Carey 92 (115); Georgia Prestwidge 3/43 (9 overs); Rhiann O'Donnell 3/43 (9 overs)

Victoria won by 24 runs
Junction Oval, St Kilda, Melbourne
Umpires: Daryl Brigham and Gaurav Bawa
Player of the match: Nicola Carey (Tasmania)

- Tasmania won the toss and elected to field.
- Points: Victoria 4, Tasmania 0

Match 39
15 February 2024
10:00
Scorecard

New South Wales; 4/142 (22 overs)	v	South Australia; 5/135 (22 overs)
Tahlia Wilson 57 (58); Amanda-Jade Wellington 2/31 (5 overs)		Madeline Penna 57* (52); Sammy-Jo Johnson 2/29 (5 overs)

New South Wales won by 7 runs
Cricket Central, Sydney
Umpires: Bede Sajowitz and Roberto Howard

- South Australia won the toss and elected to field.
- Match was reduced to 22 overs per side due to rain.
- Points: New South Wales 4, South Australia 0

Match 40
15 February 2024
9:30
Scorecard

Queensland; 5/304 (45 overs)	v	Western Australia; 136 (24.3 overs)
Georgia Voll 117 (134); Ines Mckeon 2/47 (9 overs)		Chloe Piparo 28 (34); Grace Parsons 2/16 (4 overs)

Queensland won by 182 runs (DLS method)
Allan Border Field, Brisbane
Umpires: Benny Farrell (Aus) and Riki Wessels (Eng)
Player of the match: Georgia Voll (Queensland)

- Queensland won the toss and elected to bat.
- Match was reduced to 45 overs per side due to rain.
- Western Australia were set a revised target of 319.
- Points: Queensland 5, Western Australia 0

Match 41
17 February 2024
10:00
Scorecard

New South Wales; 9/265 (50 overs)	v	South Australia; 195 (47.1 overs)
Tahlia Wilson 100 (116); Anesu Mushangwe 3/37 (10 overs)		Eleanor Larosa 55 (97); Hannah Darlington 3/30 (7 overs)

New South Wales won by 70 runs
Cricket Central, Sydney
Umpires: Andrew Hamilton and Bede Sajowitz
Player of the match: Tahlia Wilson (New South Wales)

- South Australia won the toss and elected to field.
- Points: New South Wales 5, South Australia 0

Match 42
17 February 2024
9:30
Scorecard

Western Australia; 115 (33.5 overs)	v	Queensland; 4/116 (25.4 overs)
Amy Edgar 35 (47); Jess Jonassen 4/6 (5 overs)		Jess Jonassen 29* (23); Amy Edgar 2/19 (5.4 overs)

Queensland won by 6 wickets
Allan Border Field, Brisbane
Umpires: N James and T Logan
Player of the match: Jess Jonassen (Queensland)

- Queensland won the toss and elected to field.
- Points: Queensland 5, Western Australia 0

== Final ==
Final
24 February 2024
14:05 (D/N)
Scorecard

Queensland; 7/248 (50 overs)	v	Tasmania; 4/249 (47.4 overs)
Charli Knott 73 (61); Heather Graham 3/39 (10 overs)		Nicola Carey 111* (135); Georgia Voll 3/56 (8.4 overs)

Tasmania won by 6 wickets
Bellerive Oval, Hobart
Umpires: Stephen Dionysius and Troy Penman
Player of the match: Nicola Carey (Tasmania)

- Queensland won the toss and elected to bat.
