= Amy Hunter (Australian cricketer) =

Australian cricketer

Personal information
- Full name: Amy Hunter
- Born: 20 December 2005 (age 20); Atherton
- Nickname: Ames
- Batting: Right-handed
- Bowling: Right-arm fast-medium
- Role: Bowler

Domestic team information
- Years: Team
- 2023/24–present: Australian Capital Territory

Career statistics
Competition	WLA
Matches	10
Runs scored	25
Batting average	12.50
100s/50s	0/0
Top score	10*
Balls bowled	250
Wickets	6
Bowling average	46.50
5 wickets in innings	0
10 wickets in match	0
Best bowling	3/30
Catches/stumpings	0/–
- Source: , 24 February 2026

Amy Hunter (born 20 December 2005) is an Australian cricketer who currently plays for Australian Capital Territory in the Women's National Cricket League (WNCL). She plays as a right-arm fast-medium bowler.

== Early life ==
Hunter was born on 20 December 2005 and is from Atherton, Queensland.

== Domestic career ==
In December 2022, Hunter played for Queensland Under-19s at the Under-19 National Championships, taking one wicket.

In May 2023, Hunter was named in the Australian Capital Territory squad for the upcoming season. In October 2023, she made her debut for the side in a WNCL match against Tasmania, taking 2/60 from her 9 overs.
