= Ruby Strange =

Australian cricketer

Personal information
- Full name: Ruby Strange
- Born: 25 November 2002 (age 23)
- Batting: Right-handed
- Bowling: Right-arm medium
- Role: Bowler

Domestic team information
- Years: Team
- 2024/25: Brisbane Heat (squad no. 9)
- 2025/26–present: Queensland Fire
- 2025/26–present: Perth Scorchers

Career statistics
Competition	WT20
Matches	6
Runs scored	22
Batting average	11.00
100s/50s	0/0
Top score	11
Balls bowled	72
Wickets	5
Bowling average	18.40
5 wickets in innings	0
10 wickets in match	0
Best bowling	4/31
Catches/stumpings	3/–
- Source: ESPNcricinfo, 23 October 2024

Ruby Strange (born 25 November 2002) is an Australian cricketer who plays for the Perth Scorchers and Queensland Fire. A bowler, she bowls right-arm medium and bats right-handed.

== Career ==
Strange made her Twenty20 debut for the Brisbane Heat on 11 October 2024 against the Sydney Thunder during the 2024 T20 Spring Challenge. Strange was added to the Queensland Fire list for the 2025/26 season.
