= Patrick Jackson (cricketer) =

Australian cricketer (born 1984)

Personal information
- Born: 8 April 1984 (age 42)
- Source: ESPNcricinfo, 1 January 2017

Patrick Jackson (born 8 April 1984) is an Australian cricketer. He played one first-class and one List A match for New South Wales in 2014/15.

== See also ==
- List of New South Wales representative cricketers
