= Shay Manolini =

Australian cricketer

Personal information
- Full name: Shay J Manolini
- Born: 13 April 2005 (age 21)
- Batting: Right-handed
- Bowling: Right-arm leg break
- Role: Bowler

Domestic team information
- Years: Team
- 2023/24–present: Western Australia

Career statistics
| Competition | WLA | WT20 |
|---|---|---|
| Matches | 6 | 4 |
| Runs scored | 16 | 3 |
| Batting average | 2.00 | – |
| 100s/50s | 0/0 | 0/0 |
| Top score | 8 | 3* |
| Balls bowled | 204 | 42 |
| Wickets | 4 | 1 |
| Bowling average | 43.75 | 50.00 |
| 5 wickets in innings | 0 | 0 |
| 10 wickets in match | 0 | 0 |
| Best bowling | 2/24 | 1/15 |
| Catches/stumpings | 1/– | 1/– |
- Source: CricketArchive, 26 October 2023

Shay J. Manolini (born 13 April 2005) is an Australian cricketer who currently plays for Western Australia in the Women's National Cricket League (WNCL). She plays as a right-arm leg break bowler.

== Domestic career ==
In December 2022, Manolini played for Western Australia Under-19s at the Under-19 National Championships, taking 16 wickets at an average of 12.31, including taking a hat-trick.

In September 2023, she made her debut for Western Australia in a WNCL match against Victoria, taking 1/16 from her five overs.
