= Zoe Britcliffe =

Australian cricketer

Personal information
- Full name: Zoe Rebecca Britcliffe
- Born: 15 September 2001 (age 25); Ipswich, Queensland, Australia
- Batting: Right-handed
- Bowling: Right-arm medium
- Role: Bowler

Domestic team information
- Years: Team
- 2020/21–present: Western Australia

Career statistics
Competition	WLA	WT20
Matches	27	3
Runs scored	128	7
Batting average	3.66	–
100s/50s	0/0	0/0
Top score	22*	4
Balls bowled	894	72
Wickets	20	1
Bowling average	37.30	96.00
5 wickets in innings	1	0
10 wickets in match	0	0
Best bowling	5/53	1/30
Catches/stumpings	1/–	1/–
- Source: CricketArchive, 23 September 2022

Zoe Rebecca Britcliffe (born 15 September 2001) is an Australian cricketer who plays as a right-arm medium pace bowler and right-handed batter for Western Australia in the Women's National Cricket League (WNCL). She made her WNCL debut on 17 February 2021 against Tasmania.
