= Grace Lyons (cricketer) =

Australian cricketer

Personal information
- Full name: Grace Lyons
- Born: 11 September 2005 (age 21)
- Batting: Right-handed
- Role: Wicket-keeper

Domestic team information
- Years: Team
- 2023/24–present: Australian Capital Territory

Career statistics
| Competition | WLA | WT20 |
|---|---|---|
| Matches | 29 | 8 |
| Runs scored | 613 | 54 |
| Batting average | 21.89 | 10.80 |
| 100s/50s | 0/4 | 0/0 |
| Top score | 97 | 22 |
| Catches/stumpings | 22/7 | 3/1 |
- Source: CricketArchive, 18 March 2026

Grace Lyons (born 11 September 2005) is an Australian cricketer who currently plays for the Australian Capital Territory in the Women's National Cricket League (WNCL). She plays as a wicket-keeper and right-handed batter.

== Domestic career ==
In December 2022, Lyons played for Australian Capital Territory Under-19s at the Under-19 National Championships and was the side's top scorer with 136 runs, including one half-century.

In May 2023, Lyons was named in the Australian Capital Territory squad for the upcoming season. In October 2023, she made her debut for the side in a WNCL match against Tasmania, scoring one run.
