= Annie Wikman =

Australian-Italian cricketer (born 2001)

Personal information
- Full name: Annie Sylvia Wikman
- Born: 27 April 2001 (age 25); Brisbane, Australia
- Batting: Right-handed
- Bowling: Right-arm medium
- Role: Batter

International information
- National side: Italy
- T20I debut (cap 31): 25 May 2025 v Jersey
- Last T20I: 29 May 2025 v Spain

Domestic team information
- Years: Team
- 2021/22–present: Australian Capital Territory

Career statistics
Competition	T20I	LA	T20
Matches	11	41	19
Runs scored	175	1,076	327
Batting average	25.00	29.88	23.35
100s/50s	0/1	1/7	0/1
Top score	53	142*	53
Balls bowled	31	545	31
Wickets	–	9	–
Bowling average	–	60.44	–
5 wickets in innings	–	0	–
10 wickets in match	–	0	–
Best bowling	0/4	2/41	0.4
Catches/stumpings	3/–	15/–	6/–
- Source: CricketArchive, 18 March 2026

Annie Sylvia Wikman (born 27 April 2001) is an Australian-Italian cricketer who plays primarily as a right-handed batter for the ACT Meteors in the Women's National Cricket League (WNCL). She also plays for the Italian women's national team.

== Domestic career ==
Wikman plays grade cricket for Western Suburbs District Cricket Club, and played age-group cricket for Queensland. In February 2022, she was called up to the ACT Meteors squad for the restart of the 2021–22 Women's National Cricket League season. She made her debut for the side on 13 March 2022, against Queensland, making 20 from 26 balls as her side won by 86 runs. Overall, she played four matches for the side that season. She played five matches for the side in the 2022–23 Women's National Cricket League season, scoring 147 runs and taking three wickets. She made her maiden List A half-century in December 2022, scoring 63 against South Australia.
