= Shivani Mehta =

Australian cricketer

Personal information
- Full name: Shivani Mehta
- Batting: Right-handed
- Bowling: Right-arm medium
- Role: Batter

Domestic team information
- Years: Team
- 2022/23: New South Wales

Career statistics
Competition	WLA	WT20
Matches	13	6
Runs scored	212	70
Batting average	19.27	17.50
100s/50s	0/2	0/0
Top score	53	40
Catches/stumpings	9/–	1/-
- Source: CricketArchive, 05 February 2026

Shivani Mehta is an Australian cricketer who last played for New South Wales in the Women's National Cricket League (WNCL). She plays as a right-handed batter.

== Domestic cricket ==
Mehta plays grade cricket for Northern District Cricket Club. From a young age, Mehta played a variety of sports, including cricket, football, touch football and futsal.

In January 2023, Mehta made her debut for New South Wales, against South Australia in the Women's National Cricket League. In her second match for the side, she scored 34 runs opening the batting.
