= Angelina Genford =

Australian cricketer

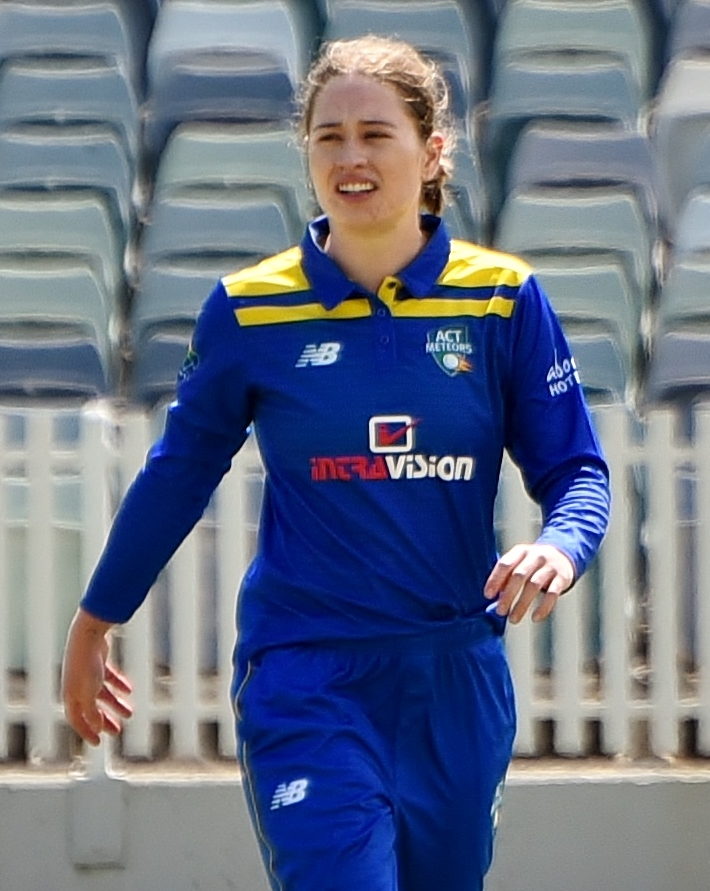
- Genford playing for the ACT in September 2022

Personal information
- Full name: Angelina Anne Genford
- Born: 30 October 2002 (age 24); Picnic Point, New South Wales, Australia
- Batting: Right-handed
- Bowling: Right-arm fast-medium
- Role: Bowler

Domestic team information
- Years: Team
- 2021/22: Hobart Hurricanes
- 2021/22: New South Wales
- 2022/23–present: Australian Capital Territory
- 2022/23: Sydney Sixers

Career statistics
Competition	WLA	WT20
Matches	24	22
Runs scored	212	44
Batting average	14.13	6.28
100s/50s	0/0	0/0
Top score	45*	27*
Balls bowled	515	133
Wickets	3	7
Bowling average	224.66	28.42
5 wickets in innings	0	0
10 wickets in match	0	0
Best bowling	1/16	1/13
Catches/stumpings	3/–	6/–
- Source: CricketArchive, 18 March 2026

Angelina Anne Genford (born 30 October 2002) is an Australian cricketer who plays as a right-arm fast-medium bowler and right-handed batter for Australian Capital Territory in the Women's National Cricket League (WNCL). She made her professional debut during the 2021–22 WBBL for Hobart Hurricanes against Adelaide Strikers, scoring eight runs off 12 balls in a 48-run loss.
