= Peta Merrilees =

Australian cricketer (born 1982)

Personal information
- Full name: Peta Anne Merrilees
- Born: 25 October 1982 (age 44); Midland, Western Australia
- Batting: Right-handed
- Role: Wicket-keeper

Domestic team information
- Years: Team
- 2000/01–2010/11: Western Australia

Career statistics
Competition	WLA	WT20
Matches	61	21
Runs scored	806	113
Batting average	16.12	10.27
100s/50s	0/1	0/0
Top score	61	29*
Catches/stumpings	14/3	2/0
- Source: CricketArchive, 29 June 2021

Peta Anne Merrilees (born 25 October 1982) is a former Australian cricketer who is a wicket-keeper and right-handed batter.

== Career ==
Between 2000–01 and 2010–11 of the Women's National Cricket League (WNCL), she represented Western Australia in 61 List A matches, eventually becoming captain of the side in 2009. During her time in the WNCL, she took 14 catches and three stumpings from behind the wicket, and scored a total of 806 runs.

== Personal life ==
Merrilees was born in Midland, a suburb of Perth, Western Australia.
