= Anika Learoyd =

Australian cricketer

Personal information
- Full name: Anika Learoyd
- Born: 14 April 2002 (age 24)
- Batting: Right-handed
- Bowling: Right-arm leg break
- Role: Batter

Domestic team information
- Years: Team
- 2020/21–present: Sydney Thunder
- 2020/21–present: New South Wales

Career statistics
Competition	WLA	WT20
Matches	46	47
Runs scored	1,047	535
Batting average	28.29	18.44
100s/50s	2/6	0/1
Top score	131	60
Balls bowled	30	12
Wickets	2	0
Bowling average	20.50	–
5 wickets in innings	0	–
10 wickets in match	0	–
Best bowling	1/2	–
Catches/stumpings	12/–	9/–
- Source: CricketArchive, 10 February 2025

Anika Learoyd is an Australian Gumbaynggirr cricketer who plays as a right-handed batter and right-arm leg break bowler. She was the leading run-scorer in the 2020 Cricket Australia Under-18 National Championships with 384 runs at an average of 42.67. She plays for the Sydney Thunder in the Women's Big Bash League and the New South Wales Breakers in the Women's National Cricket League. She made her debut for the Thunder on 25 October 2020 against the Sydney Sixers but the match was abandoned after the toss. She made her Breakers debut on 25 February 2021 against the Tasmanian Tigers, scoring 9 not out.

In March 2026, Learyod signed as an overseas player for Somerset.
