= Grace Dignam =

Australian cricketer

Personal information
- Full name: Grace Jane Dignam
- Born: 2 January 2003 (age 23); Armidale, NSW, Australia
- Nickname: Diggers, Digs
- Batting: Right-handed
- Bowling: Right-arm off break
- Role: All-rounder

Domestic team information
- Years: Team
- 2023/24–present: Australian Capital Territory

Career statistics
Competition	WLA	WT20
Matches	20	8
Runs scored	224	24
Batting average	12.44	6.00
100s/50s	0/1	0/0
Top score	50	9
Balls bowled	869	165
Wickets	24	14
Bowling average	29.25	13.35
5 wickets in innings	0	0
10 wickets in match	0	0
Best bowling	4/44	3/16
Catches/stumpings	2/–	3/–
- Source: CricketArchive, 29 December 2025

Grace J Dignam (born 2 January 2003) is an Australian cricketer who currently plays for Australian Capital Territory in the Women's National Cricket League (WNCL). She plays as a right-arm off break bowler and right-handed batter.

== Domestic career ==
In May 2023, Dignam was named in the Australian Capital Territory squad for the upcoming season. In January 2024, she made her debut for the side in a WNCL match against Western Australia, taking 1/27 from her 3.5 overs. Dignam was named the ACT Meteors player of the year for the 2024/25 season.
