= Zoe Cooke =

Australian cricketer (born 1995)

Personal information
- Full name: Zoe Ellise Cooke
- Born: 17 September 1995 (age 31); Bruce, Australian Capital Territory
- Batting: Right-handed
- Bowling: Right-arm medium
- Role: Bowler

Domestic team information
- Years: Team
- 2010/11–2013/14: Australian Capital Territory
- 2018/19–2022/23: Australian Capital Territory
- 2018/19: Melbourne Renegades
- 2021/22–2022/23: Brisbane Heat
- 2023/24–present: Queensland

Career statistics
Competition	WLA	WT20
Matches	76	37
Runs scored	921	98
Batting average	21.92	16.33
100s/50s	1/2	0/0
Top score	114	25*
Balls bowled	2,542	330
Wickets	72	15
Bowling average	27,16	26.00
5 wickets in innings	1	0
10 wickets in match	0	0
Best bowling	5/31	3/14
Catches/stumpings	22/–	9/–
- Source: CricketArchive, 18 March 2026

Zoe Ellise Cooke (born 17 September 1995) is an Australian cricketer who plays as a right-arm medium pace bowler and right-handed batter for Queensland in the Women's National Cricket League. She spent the 2018–19 Women's Big Bash League season with the Melbourne Renegades but did not make an appearance. She has previously played for ACT Meteors.
