= Katie Mack (cricketer) =

Australian cricketer (born 1993)

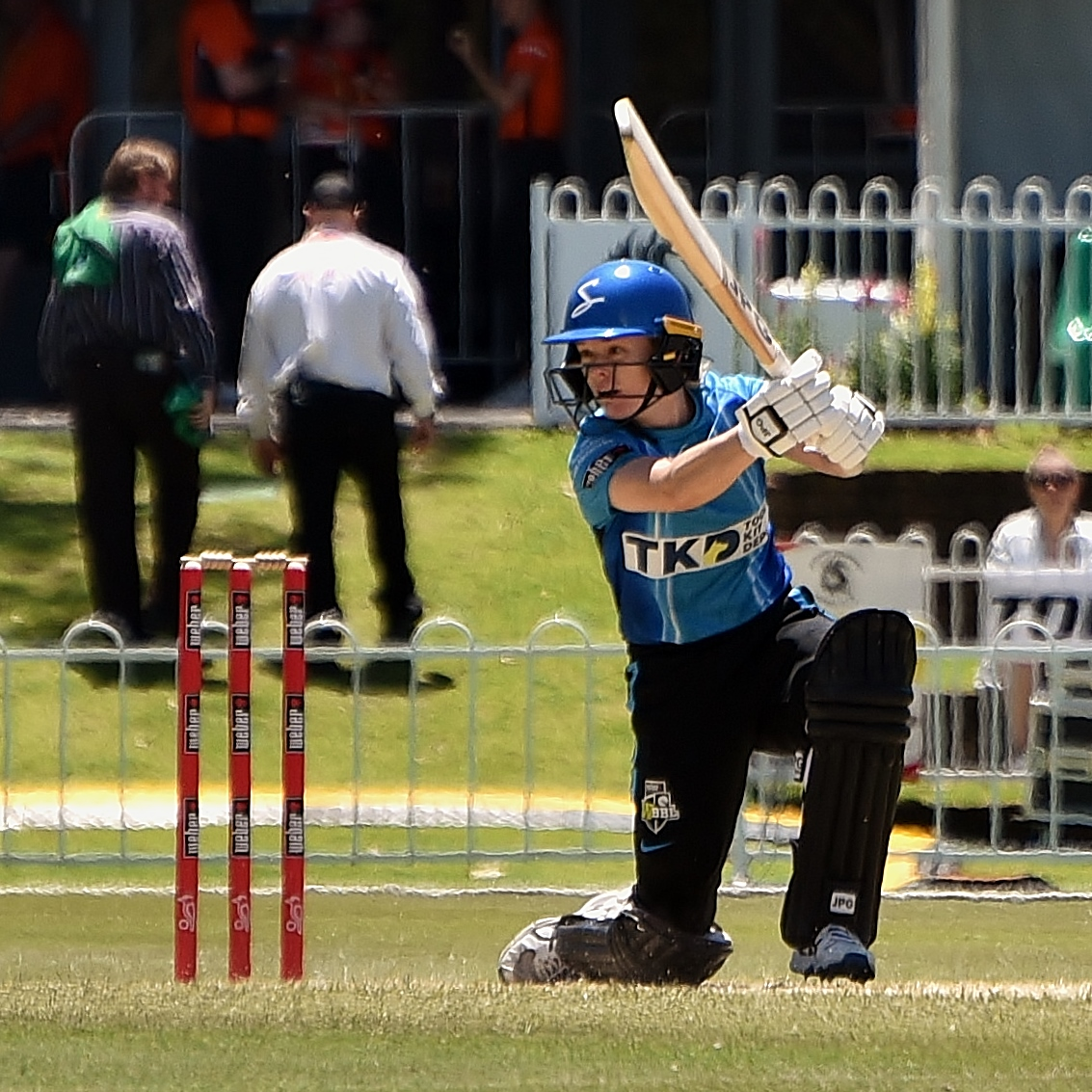
- Mack batting for Adelaide Strikers during WBBL|08

Personal information
- Full name: Katie Maree Mack
- Born: 14 September 1993 (age 33); Sydney, New South Wales, Australia
- Nickname: Brina; K-MAX, Mack Attack, K-Truck
- Batting: Right-handed
- Bowling: Right-arm leg break
- Role: Opening batter

Domestic team information
- Years: Team
- 2012: Essex
- 2013/14–2024/25: Australian Capital Territory (squad no. 2)
- 2015/16–2018/19: Melbourne Stars (squad no. 2)
- 2019/20–2024/25: Adelaide Strikers (squad no. 2)
- 2021: Birmingham Phoenix (squad no. 2)
- 2024: North West Thunder (squad no. 2)
- 2025: Lancashire (squad no. 2)
- 2025/26–present: New South Wales (squad no. 2)
- 2025/26–present: Perth Scorchers (squad no. 2)

Career statistics
Competition	WLA	WT20
Matches	107	186
Runs scored	3,902	3,386
Batting average	38.63	24.01
100s/50s	7/27	0/14
Top score	140*	89*
Balls bowled	95	66
Wickets	7	4
Bowling average	9.85	12.25
5 wickets in innings	0	0
10 wickets in match	0	0
Best bowling	3/16	3/20
Catches/stumpings	42/–	46/–
- Source: CricketArchive, 10 February 2025

Katie Maree Mack (born 14 September 1993) is an Australian cricketer who plays as a right-handed batter and right-arm leg break bowler for the New South Wales Breakers in the Women's National Cricket League (WNCL), Perth Scorchers in the Women's Big Bash League (WBBL) and Lancashire for the 2025 Metro One-Day Cup and 2025 Vitality T20 Cup. She has previously played for Essex, Melbourne Stars, Birmingham Phoenix and the ACT Meteors.

== Career ==
Mack began her domestic career as a rookie with New South Wales in 2012. Originally a bowling all-rounder, Mack made the switch to batting to further her chances of selection. On 27 May 2012, Mack made her List A debut for Essex in the 2012 Women's County Championship against Yorkshire.

Prior to the start of the 2013/14 domestic season, she moved to play for the ACT Meteors due to a lack of opportunity with New South Wales. Mack made her maiden List A century on 20 December 2014, scoring 106 from 131 balls in a five-wicket defeat to Queensland Fire. She signed with the Melbourne Stars for the inaugural Women's Big Bash League season.

In October 2017, she was named in the Cricket Australia XI squad for a three-day tour match against England as part of their tour of Australia. In August 2019, she signed with the Adelaide Strikers ahead of 2019–20 Women's Big Bash League season.

On 7 February 2021, she carried her bat against South Australia, scoring 106 off 131 balls in a losing cause. During the 2020/21 WNCL season, Mack was the third-highest run-scorer with 418 runs at an average of 59.71.

In January 2022, Mack was named in Australia's A squad for their series against England A, with the matches being played alongside the Women's Ashes. Ahead of the 2022/23 WNCL season, she was named as the captain of the Meteors as a replacement for Angela Reakes. She was included in the team of the tournament for the 2023–24 Women's National Cricket League season with 471 runs at an average of 47.10 and a high score of 140*.

She was named as the Adelaide Striker's MVP following the conclusion of the 2023–24 Women's Big Bash League season, scoring 452 runs from 15 matches. In June 2024, she was added to the Australia A squad for the Indian tour of Australia. On 14 August, she scored a century against India A.

Mack rejoined Lancashire in 2025 on an overseas contract for the Metro One-Day Cup and the first three matches in the Vitality T20 Cup. In April 2025, she moved to the New South Wales Breakers ahead of the 2025/26 domestic season.
