= Australian Capital Territory women's cricket team =

Australian Capital Territory

Personnel
- Captain: Katie Mack
- Coach: Erin Osborne

Team information
- Colours: Dark Blue Gold
- Founded: First recorded match: 1978
- Home ground: Manuka Oval, Canberra
- Capacity: 16,000
- Secondary home ground(s): Phillip Oval, Canberra

History
- First-class debut: Queensland in 1978 at St Andrew's Cricket Ground No 3, Sydney
- AWCC wins: 0
- WNCL wins: 0
- WT20C wins: 0
- Official website: Cricket ACT

The Australian Capital Territory women's cricket team, also known as the Intravision ACT Meteors, is the women's representative cricket team for the Australian Capital Territory. They play most of their home games at Manuka Oval, Canberra and they also use Phillip Oval, Canberra. They compete in the Women's National Cricket League (WNCL), the premier 50-over women's cricket tournament in Australia. They previously played in the now-defunct Australian Women's Twenty20 Cup and Australian Women's Cricket Championships.

== History ==
=== 1978–1995: Australian Women's Cricket Championships ===
Australian Capital Territory's first recorded match was against Queensland in the Australian Women's Cricket Championships on 27 to 28 December 1978, which they won on first innings. With the exception of 1980–81, they subsequently competed in every Australian Women's Cricket Championships up to and including its penultimate season in 1994–95. Their best finish came in 1992–93, when they drew the third-place playoff with Western Australia but secured third place based on first innings score.

=== 2009–present: Twenty20 Cup and Women's National Cricket League ===
Australian Capital Territory joined the Australian Women's Twenty20 Cup and the WNCL in 2009–10, finishing a respectable third in both competitions.

Australian Capital Territory finished fourth in the 2013–14 Twenty20 Cup and qualified for the semi-finals, where they met New South Wales. Australian Capital Territory won the match by 12 runs thanks to six wickets from Rhiannon Dick. However, they lost the final to Queensland by seven wickets after scoring only 107 batting first.

== Grounds ==
Prior to joining the WNCL, Australian Capital Territory played their home games at a number of grounds in Canberra, including Kingston Oval, Reid Oval, Manuka Oval, Stirling Oval, Kaleen Oval, Boomanulla Oval, O'Connor Oval, Deakin West Ground and St Edmund's College Oval.

After joining the WNCL in 2009–10, Australian Capital Territory used Manuka Oval for all of their home matches until 2012. In 2012 and 2013 they played home matches at Freebody Oval in Queanbeyan, Chisholm Oval in Canberra and Robertson Oval in Wagga Wagga. Since 2014 they have resumed playing at the Manuka Oval for the majority of their matches. They have also started to use Phillip Oval, Canberra, playing their first match there against England on 28 January 2020. They played their five 2020–21 WNCL home games and their six 2021–22 WNCL home games at Phillip Oval (now also known as EPC Solar Park). In the 2022–23 WNCL, they split their home matches between Phillip Oval and Manuka Oval.

== Players ==
=== Current squad ===
Based on squad announced for the 2023/24 season. Players in bold have international caps.

No.	Name	Nat.	Birth date	Batting style	Bowling style	Notes
Batters
2	Katie Mack	(Australia)	14 September 1993 (age 33)	Right-handed	Right-arm leg break	Captain
10	Shivani Mehta	(Australia)	20 December 2005 (age 20)	Right-handed	—N/a	
25	**Annie Wikman**	(Italy)	27 April 2001 (age 25)	Right-handed	Right-arm medium	
All-rounders
99	Alisha Bates	(Australia)	18 March 2002 (age 24)	Left-handed	Slow left-arm orthodox	
28	Grace Dignam	(Australia)	2 January 2003 (age 23)	Right-handed	Right-arm off break	
74	Carly Leeson	(Australia)	9 November 1998 (age 27)	Right-handed	Right-arm medium	
33	Olivia Porter	(Australia)	14 November 2001 (age 24)	Right-handed	Right-arm medium	
Wicket-keepers
19	Paris Bowdler	(Australia)	24 November 2004 (age 21)	Right-handed	–	
12	Grace Lyons	(Australia)	11 September 2005 (age 21)	Right-handed	–	
Bowlers
12	Zoe Cooke	(Australia)	17 September 1995 (age 31)	Right-handed	Right-arm medium	
9	**Holly Ferling**	(Australia)	22 December 1995 (age 30)	Right-handed	Right-arm fast-medium	
6	Angelina Genford	(Australia)	30 October 2002 (age 23)	Right-handed	Right-arm fast-medium	
77	Amy Hunter	(Australia)	20 December 2005 (age 20)	Right-handed	Right-arm medium	
11	Gabby Sutcliffe	(Australia)	11 April 2002 (age 24)	Right-handed	Right-arm medium	
61	Chelsea Moscript	(Australia)	4 October 1995 (age 31)	Left-handed	Right-arm leg break	
61	**Anesu Mushangwe**	(Zimbabwe)	25 February 1996 (age 30)	Right-handed	Right-arm leg break	

=== Notable players ===
Players who have played for Australian Capital Territory and played internationally are listed below, in order of first international appearance (given in brackets):

- (Australia) Christina Matthews (1984)
- (Australia) Lyn Larsen (1984)
- (Australia) Glenda Hall (1984)
- (Australia) Frances Leonard (1986)
- (Australia) Cathy Smith (1987)
- (Australia) Lynette Cook (1987)
- (Australia) Jodie Davis (1988)
- (Australia) Bronwyn Calver (1991)
- (Australia) Kim Fazackerley (1992)
- (New Zealand) Kate Pulford (1999)
- (England) Leanne Davis (2000)
- (New Zealand) Nicola Browne (2002)
- (New Zealand) Sara McGlashan (2002)
- (Australia) Kris Britt (2003)
- (Australia) Leonie Coleman (2004)
- (Australia) Jodie Fields (2006)
- (England) Lynsey Askew (2006)
- (Australia) Rene Farrell (2007)
- (Australia) Erin Osborne (2009)
- (South Africa) Dane van Niekerk (2009)
- (South Africa) Marizanne Kapp (2009)
- (New Zealand) Sian Ruck (2009)
- (Australia) Sarah Coyte (2010)
- (New Zealand) Lea Tahuhu (2011)
- (England) Georgia Elwiss (2011)
- (Australia) Holly Ferling (2013)
- (New Zealand) Hayley Jensen (2014)
- (Bangladesh) Jannatul Ferdus (2018)
- (Australia) Erin Burns (2019)
- (Italy) Annie Wikman (2025)

== Coaching staff ==
- Head coach: Erin Osborne

== Honours ==
- Australian Women's Cricket Championships:
  - Winners (0):
  - Best finish: 3rd (1991–92, 1992–93)
- Women's National Cricket League:
  - Winners (0):
  - Best finish: 3rd (2009–10, 2010–11, 2011–12)
- Australian Women's Twenty20 Cup (0):
  - Winners (0):
  - Best finish: runners-up (2013–14)
- T20 Spring Challenge
  - Winners (0):

== See also ==
- ACT Comets
