= 2021–22 Sydney Thunder WBBL season =

Women's Big Bash Cricket season

Sydney Thunder
2021–22 season
- Sydney Thunder 2021–22 cap logo
- Coach: Trevor Griffin
- Captain(s): Rachael Haynes, Hannah Darlington
- Home ground: N/A
- League: WBBL
- Record: 4–8 (7th)
- Finals: Did not qualify
- Leading Run Scorer: Smriti Mandhana – 377
- Leading Wicket Taker: Hannah Darlington – 16
- Player of the Season: Smriti Mandhana

The 2021–22 Sydney Thunder Women's season was the seventh in the team's history. Coached by Trevor Griffin, the Thunder entered WBBL|07 as the defending champions but ended the regular season in seventh place on the ladder, recording their worst finishing position across the league's first seven editions. Due to ongoing border restrictions related to the COVID-19 pandemic, they were not scheduled to play any games in their home state of New South Wales for the season. After captain Rachael Haynes announced she would be unlikely to participate in the season due to family reasons, Hannah Darlington was appointed to stand in as Haynes' replacement.

== Squad ==
Each 2021–22 squad was made up of 15 active players. Teams could sign up to five 'marquee players', with a maximum of three of those from overseas. Marquees were defined as any overseas player, or a local player who holds a Cricket Australia national contract at the start of the WBBL|07 signing period.

Personnel changes made ahead of the season included:

- English marquees Heather Knight and Tammy Beaumont did not re-sign with the Thunder in anticipation of a clashing schedule with national team duties.
- South African marquee Shabnim Ismail initially re-signed with the Thunder but withdrew from the tournament due to injury.
- Indian marquee Smriti Mandhana signed with the Thunder, returning to the league after previously playing for the Brisbane Heat and Hobart Hurricanes.
- Indian marquee Deepti Sharma and English marquee Issy Wong signed with the Thunder, marking their first appearances in the leagues.
- Rachel Trenaman departed the Thunder, signing with the Hobart Hurricanes.
- Corinne Hall signed with the Thunder, departing the Hobart Hurricanes.
- Having planned to miss the opening weeks while on parental leave, Rachael Haynes announced she would only be able to re-join the team later in the tournament pending sufficient changes to state border closures.

Changes made during the season included:

- Emily Smith was signed as a local replacement player, replacing Tahlia Wilson (leg injury) for one game on 16 October 2021.

The table below lists the Thunder players and their key stats (including runs scored, batting strike rate, wickets taken, economy rate, catches and stumpings) for the season.

No.	Name	Nat.	Birth date	Batting style	Bowling style	G	R	SR	W	E	C	S	Notes
Batters
29	Corinne Hall	(Australia)	12 October 1987	Right-handed	Right-arm off spin	10	90	83.33	–	–	1	–	
15	Rachael Haynes	(Australia)	26 December 1986	Left-handed	Left-arm medium	–	–	–	–	–	–	–	Captain, Australian marquee
4	Anika Learoyd	(Australia)	14 April 2002	Right-handed	Right-arm leg spin	11	92	78.63	0	15.50	1	–	
36	Phoebe Litchfield	(Australia)	18 April 2003	Left-handed	Right-arm leg spin	13	263	109.12	–	–	9	–	
81	Smriti Mandhana	(India)	18 July 1996	Left-handed	Right-arm off spin	13	377	130.44	–	–	4	–	Overseas marquee
All-rounders
58	Sammy-Jo Johnson	(Australia)	5 November 1992	Right-handed	Right-arm medium fast	11	146	125.86	10	7.66	1	–	
33	Kate Peterson	(Australia)	3 December 2002	Right-handed	Right-arm medium fast	7	0	0.00	1	10.33	3	–	
14	Olivia Porter	(Australia)	14 November 2001	Right-handed	Right-arm medium	–	–	–	–	–	–	–	
24	Deepti Sharma	(India)	24 August 1997	Left-handed	Right-arm off spin	13	211	106.56	13	7.15	8	–	Overseas marquee
Wicket-keepers
3	Emily Smith	(Australia)	19 January 1995	Right-handed	–	1	5	125.00	–	–	0	2	Injury replacement
21	Tahlia Wilson	(Australia)	21 October 1999	Right-handed	–	12	178	81.65	–	–	3	2	
Bowlers
34	Samantha Bates	(Australia)	17 August 1992	Right-handed	Left-arm orthodox	13	2	66.66	12	5.76	2	–	
25	Hannah Darlington	(Australia)	25 January 2002	Right-handed	Right-arm medium	13	60	105.26	16	6.38	4	–	Acting captain
12	Jessica Davidson	(Australia)	3 May 2003	Right-handed	Right-arm medium fast	–	–	–	–	–	–	–	
2	Lauren Smith	(Australia)	6 October 1996	Right-handed	Right-arm off spin	13	41	105.12	4	8.66	3	–	
8	Issy Wong	(England)	15 May 2002	Right-handed	Right-arm medium fast	13	56	155.55	9	7.27	2	–	Overseas marquee

== Ladder ==
Pos	Team	Pld	W	L	NR	Pts	NRR
1	Perth Scorchers (C)	14	9	3	2	20	0.649
2	Melbourne Renegades (CF)	14	8	4	2	18	−0.149
3	Brisbane Heat (EF)	14	8	5	1	17	0.517
4	Adelaide Strikers (RU)	14	7	6	1	15	0.707
5	Melbourne Stars	14	5	7	2	12	−0.385
6	Hobart Hurricanes	14	5	8	1	11	−0.258
7	Sydney Thunder	14	4	8	2	10	−0.301
8	Sydney Sixers	14	4	9	1	9	−0.704

Source: cricket.com.au, ESPN Cricinfo
- The top 4 teams advanced to the play-off phase

== Fixtures ==
All times are local

Match 3
16 October 2021
19:05 (N)
Scorecard

Adelaide Strikers; 7/140 (20 overs)	v	Sydney Thunder; 110 (19.2 overs)
Tahlia McGrath 42 (34); Lauren Smith 2/17 (2 overs)		Corinne Hall 38 (35); Tahlia McGrath 3/17 (4 overs)

Adelaide Strikers won by 30 runs
Blundstone Arena, Hobart
Umpires: Simon Lightbody and Mattis van Eck
Player of the match: Tahlia McGrath (Adelaide Strikers)

- Sydney Thunder won the toss and elected to field.
- Broadcast by Seven Network and Foxtel
- At 19 years and 264 days, Hannah Darlington (Sydney Thunder) became the youngest player to captain a team in a WBBL match.

Match 12
23 October 2021
15:40
Scorecard

Sydney Thunder	v	Sydney Sixers

Match abandoned
University of Tasmania Stadium, Launceston
Umpires: Claire Polosak and Muhammad Qureshi

- No toss
- No play was possible due to rain.
- Broadcast by Seven Network and Foxtel

Match 16
24 October 2021
17:15 (D/N)
Scorecard

Perth Scorchers; 2/186 (20 overs)	v	Sydney Thunder; 9/105 (20 overs)
Sophie Devine 101 (60); Issy Wong 1/24 (3 overs)		Phoebe Litchfield 24 (34); Alana King 4/11 (4 overs)

Perth Scorchers won by 81 runs
University of Tasmania Stadium, Launceston
Umpires: Andrew Crozier and Simon Lightbody
Player of the match: Sophie Devine (Perth Scorchers)

- Sydney Thunder won the toss and elected to field.
- Broadcast by Seven Network and Foxtel

Match 17
26 October 2021
13:25
Scorecard

Melbourne Stars; 7/108 (20 overs)	v	Sydney Thunder; 5/96 (20 overs)
Elyse Villani 52 (63); Issy Wong 2/19 (4 overs)		Deepti Sharma 44* (48); Kim Garth 3/11 (4 overs)

Melbourne Stars won by 12 runs
University of Tasmania Stadium, Launceston
Umpires: Andrew Crozier and David Taylor
Player of the match: Kim Garth (Melbourne Stars)

- Melbourne Stars won the toss and elected to bat.
- Broadcast by Cricket Network and Foxtel

Match 19
27 October 2021
13:25
Scorecard

Melbourne Renegades; 5/142 (20 overs)	v	Sydney Thunder; 8/133 (20 overs)
Jemimah Rodrigues 75* (56); Kate Peterson 1/10 (2 overs)		Smriti Mandhana 64 (44); Courtney Webb 3/21 (3 overs)

Melbourne Renegades won by 9 runs
University of Tasmania Stadium, Launceston
Umpires: Andrew Crozier and Roberto Howard
Player of the match: Jemimah Rodrigues (Melbourne Renegades)

- Melbourne Renegades won the toss and elected to bat.
- Broadcast by Cricket Network and Foxtel

Match 22
30 October 2021
16:05 (D/N)
Scorecard

Sydney Thunder; 5/133 (20 overs)	v	Melbourne Stars; 8/114 (20 overs)
Tahlia Wilson 53 (53); Erin Osborne 2/25 (4 overs)		Elyse Villani 38 (31); Deepti Sharma 3/25 (4 overs)

Sydney Thunder won by 19 runs
University of Tasmania Stadium, Launceston
Umpires: Roberto Howard and Jeremiah Matibiri
Player of the match: Samantha Bates (Sydney Thunder)

- Sydney Thunder won the toss and elected to bat.
- Broadcast by Cricket Network and Foxtel

Match 25
31 October 2021
10:15
Scorecard

Sydney Thunder; 6/146 (20 overs)	v	Hobart Hurricanes; 8/109 (20 overs)
Smriti Mandhana 50 (50); Nicola Carey 2/36 (4 overs)		Mignon du Preez 41 (39); Deepti Sharma 3/13 (4 overs)

Sydney Thunder won by 37 runs
University of Tasmania Stadium, Launceston
Umpires: Shawn Craig and Roberto Howard
Player of the match: Deepti Sharma (Sydney Thunder)

- Sydney Thunder won the toss and elected to bat.
- Broadcast by Seven Network and Foxtel

Match 34
7 November 2021
9:45
Scorecard

Sydney Thunder; 7/143 (20 overs)	v	Brisbane Heat; 5/144 (18.2 overs)
Phoebe Litchfield 40 (32); Poonam Yadav 3/17 (4 overs)		Georgia Redmayne 57 (45); Hannah Darlington 3/21 (4 overs)

Brisbane Heat won by 5 wickets (with 10 balls remaining)
Adelaide Oval, Adelaide
Umpires: Claire Polosak and Harsimran Singh
Player of the match: Georgia Redmayne (Brisbane Heat)

- Sydney Thunder won the toss and elected to bat.
- Broadcast by Seven Network and Foxtel

Match 38
9 November 2021
17:30 (D/N)
Scorecard

Adelaide Strikers; 4/176 (20 overs)	v	Sydney Thunder; 6/158 (20 overs)
Dane van Niekerk 58 (46); Sammy-Jo Johnson 2/25 (4 overs)		Issy Wong 43 (17); Tahlia McGrath 2/20 (4 overs)

Adelaide Strikers won by 18 runs
Karen Rolton Oval, Adelaide
Umpires: Nathan Johnstone and Simon Lightbody
Player of the match: Laura Wolvaardt (Adelaide Strikers)

- Adelaide Strikers won the toss and elected to bat.
- Broadcast by Cricket Network and Foxtel

Match 41
11 November 2021
12:55
Scorecard

Perth Scorchers; 2/184 (20 overs)	v	Sydney Thunder; 1/21 (2.3 overs)
Beth Mooney 83* (53); Hannah Darlington 1/32 (4 overs)		Smriti Mandhana 12* (8); Marizanne Kapp 1/8 (1.3 overs)

No result
Karen Rolton Oval, Adelaide
Umpires: D Bhatt and Nathan Johnstone

- Perth Scorchers won the toss and elected to bat.
- No further play was possible due to rain.
- Broadcast by Cricket Network and Foxtel

Match 46
14 November 2021
12:40
Scorecard

Sydney Sixers; 6/94 (20 overs)	v	Sydney Thunder; 4/96 (15.2 overs)
Ellyse Perry 40* (40); Hannah Darlington 2/15 (4 overs)		Smriti Mandhana 45 (39); Lauren Cheatle 3/15 (4 overs)

Sydney Thunder won by 6 wickets (with 28 balls remaining)
Harrup Park, Mackay
Umpires: Stephen Dionysius and David Taylor
Player of the match: Issy Wong (Sydney Thunder)

- Sydney Sixers won the toss and elected to bat.
- Broadcast by Seven Network and Foxtel
- Brisbane Heat qualified for finals.

Match 48
17 November 2021
18:05 (N)
Scorecard

Melbourne Renegades; 4/175 (20 overs)	v	Sydney Thunder; 2/171 (20 overs)
Harmanpreet Kaur 81* (55); Samantha Bates 2/21 (4 overs)		Smriti Mandhana 114* (64); Rhiann O'Donnell 1/25 (3 overs)

Melbourne Renegades won by 4 runs
Harrup Park, Mackay
Umpires: Joshua Adie and Nathan James
Player of the match: Smriti Mandhana (Sydney Thunder)

- Sydney Thunder won the toss and elected to field.
- Broadcast by Cricket Network and Foxtel
- Smriti Mandhana (Sydney Thunder) equalled the WBBL record for most runs scored in an innings.
- Sydney Thunder were eliminated from finals contention.

Match 50
19 November 2021
18:05 (D/N)
Scorecard

Sydney Thunder; 5/162 (20 overs)	v	Brisbane Heat; 9/153 (20 overs)
Sammy-Jo Johnson 52 (36); Nadine de Klerk 1/15 (3 overs)		Georgia Redmayne 54 (52); Deepti Sharma 2/21 (4 overs)

Sydney Thunder won by 9 runs
Harrup Park, Mackay
Umpires: Joshua Adie and Steven Farrell
Player of the match: Sammy-Jo Johnson (Sydney Thunder)

- Sydney Thunder won the toss and elected to bat.
- Broadcast by Cricket Network and Foxtel

Match 53
20 November 2021
14:40
Scorecard

Hobart Hurricanes; 5/147 (20 overs)	v	Sydney Thunder; 9/143 (20 overs)
Mignon du Preez 87* (61); Samantha Bates 2/22 (4 overs)		Sammy-Jo Johnson 39 (21); Belinda Vakarewa 3/8 (4 overs)

Hobart Hurricanes won by 4 runs
Harrup Park, Mackay
Umpires: Joshua Adie and Stephen Dionysius
Player of the match: Belinda Vakarewa (Hobart Hurricanes)

- Hobart Hurricanes won the toss and elected to bat.
- Broadcast by Cricket Network and Foxtel

== Statistics and awards ==
- Most runs: Smriti Mandhana – 377 (10th in the league)
- Highest score in an innings: Smriti Mandhana – 114* (64) vs Melbourne Renegades, 17 November 2021
- Most wickets: Hannah Darlington – 16 (equal 5th in the league)
- Best bowling figures in an innings: Deepti Sharma – 3/13 (4 overs) vs Hobart Hurricanes, 31 October 2021
- Most catches (fielder): Phoebe Litchfield – 9 (4th in the league)
- Player of the Match awards:
  - Samantha Bates, Sammy-Jo Johnson, Smriti Mandhana, Deepti Sharma, Issy Wong – 1 each
- WBBL|07 Team of the Tournament: Hannah Darlington
- WBBL|07 Young Gun Award: Phoebe Litchfield
- Alex Blackwell Medallist: Smriti Mandhana
