= 2022–23 Sydney Thunder WBBL season =

Women's Big Bash Cricket season

Sydney Thunder
2022–23 season
- Sydney Thunder 2022–23 cap logo
- Coach: Trevor Griffin
- Captain(s): Rachael Haynes
- Home ground: Blacktown ISP Oval
- League: WBBL
- Record: 1–10 (8th)
- Finals: DNQ
- Leading Run Scorer: Phoebe Litchfield – 280
- Leading Wicket Taker: Samantha Bates – 12
- Player of the Season: Phoebe Litchfield

The 2022–23 Sydney Thunder Women's season was the eighth in the team's history. Coached by Trevor Griffin, the Thunder finished the regular season of WBBL|08 in last place. After missing the entirety of WBBL|07 due to family reasons, captain Rachael Haynes returned to the team in 2022–23 for her final season, having announced her impending retirement from professional cricket.

== Squad ==
Each 2022–23 squad was made up of 15 active players. Teams could sign up to five 'marquee players', with a maximum of three of those from overseas. Marquees were defined as any overseas player, or a local player who holds a Cricket Australia national contract at the start of the WBBL|08 signing period.

Personnel changes made ahead of the season included:

- English marquee Issy Wong departed the Thunder, signing with the Hobart Hurricanes.
- Indian marquees Smriti Mandhana and Deepti Sharma did not re-sign with the Thunder.
- English marquee Tammy Beaumont returned to the Thunder after a season's absence.
- English marquee Amy Jones signed with the Thunder, having previously played for the Sydney Sixers and Perth Scorchers.
- South African marquee Chloe Tryon signed with the Thunder, having previously played for the Hobart Hurricanes.
- New Zealand marquee Lea Tahuhu signed with the Thunder as a replacement player, having previously played for the Melbourne Renegades.
- Kate Peterson departed the Thunder, signing with the Sydney Sixers.
- Belinda Vakarewa returned to the Thunder, departing the Hobart Hurricanes.
- Saskia Horley returned to the Thunder as a replacement player. Horley was approved as a local signing due to her permanent residence in Australia, despite having recently played international cricket for Scotland.

The table below lists the Thunder players and their key stats (including runs scored, batting strike rate, wickets taken, economy rate, catches and stumpings) for the season.

No.	Name	Nat.	Birth date	Batting style	Bowling style	G	R	SR	W	E	C	S	Notes
Batters
91	Tammy Beaumont	(England)	11 March 1991	Right-handed	–	12	194	119.01	–	–	0	–	Overseas marquee
29	Corinne Hall	(Australia)	12 October 1987	Right-handed	Right-arm off spin	–	–	–	–	–	–	–	
15	Rachael Haynes	(Australia)	26 December 1986	Left-handed	Left-arm medium	14	223	97.37	–	–	4	–	Captain, Australian marquee
4	Anika Learoyd	(Australia)	14 April 2002	Right-handed	Right-arm leg spin	3	45	60.00	–	–	1	–	
36	Phoebe Litchfield	(Australia)	18 April 2003	Left-handed	Right-arm leg spin	14	280	117.64	–	–	3	–	
All-rounders
23	Saskia Horley	(Australia)	23 February 2000	Right-handed	Right-arm off spin	–	–	–	–	–	–	–	Replacement player
58	Sammy-Jo Johnson	(Australia)	5 November 1992	Right-handed	Right-arm medium fast	14	134	89.93	9	8.33	4	–	
14	Olivia Porter	(Australia)	14 November 2001	Right-handed	Right-arm medium	10	55	112.24	0	10.00	4	–	
94	Chloe Tryon	(South Africa)	25 January 1994	Right-handed	Left-arm orthodox	10	97	96.03	5	6.26	2	–	Overseas marquee
Wicket-keepers
40	Amy Jones	(England)	13 June 1993	Right-handed	–	11	210	103.44	–	–	3	0	Overseas marquee; † × 5 inns
21	Tahlia Wilson	(Australia)	21 October 1999	Right-handed	–	10	85	75.89	–	–	2	3	† × 7 inns
Bowlers
34	Samantha Bates	(Australia)	17 August 1992	Right-handed	Left-arm orthodox	14	8	34.78	12	6.02	4	–	
25	Hannah Darlington	(Australia)	25 January 2002	Right-handed	Right-arm medium	7	42	135.48	7	8.43	1	–	
12	Jessica Davidson	(Australia)	3 May 2003	Right-handed	Right-arm medium fast	–	–	–	–	–	–	–	
2	Lauren Smith	(Australia)	6 October 1996	Right-handed	Right-arm off spin	13	29	74.35	11	6.54	2	–	
19	Lea Tahuhu	(New Zealand)	23 September 1990	Right-handed	Right-arm fast	9	17	62.96	4	7.00	1	–	Overseas marquee (replacement)
47	Belinda Vakarewa	(Australia)	22 January 1998	Right-handed	Right-arm medium fast	13	43	119.44	5	6.24	4	–	

== Ladder ==
Pos	Team	Pld	W	L	NR	Pts	NRR
1	Sydney Sixers (RU)	14	11	2	1	23	0.695
2	Adelaide Strikers (C)	14	8	5	1	17	0.390
3	Brisbane Heat (CF)	14	8	5	1	17	0.276
4	Hobart Hurricanes (EF)	14	7	6	1	15	0.457
5	Perth Scorchers	14	6	7	1	13	0.373
6	Melbourne Stars	14	5	6	3	13	−0.339
7	Melbourne Renegades	14	4	9	1	9	−1.042
8	Sydney Thunder	14	1	10	3	5	−1.000

Source: cricket.com.au, ESPN Cricinfo
- The top 4 teams advanced to the play-off phase

== Fixtures ==
All times are AEDT.

Match 2
14 October 2022
15:00
Scorecard

Hobart Hurricanes; 5/125 (20 overs)	v	Sydney Thunder; 9/106 (20 overs)
Mignon du Preez 33 (27); Chloe Tryon 2/14 (3 overs)		Tahlia Wilson 26 (30); Heather Graham 3/15 (4 overs)

Hobart Hurricanes won by 19 runs
Blacktown ISP Oval, Sydney
Umpires: Andrew Hamilton and Roberto Howard
Player of the match: Heather Graham (Hobart Hurricanes)

- Sydney Thunder won the toss and elected to field.
- Broadcast by cricket.com.au and Foxtel

Match 7
16 October 2022
17:00 (D/N)
Scorecard

Sydney Thunder; 8/88 (20 overs)	v	Perth Scorchers; 1/89 (14.5 overs)
Tahlia Wilson 28 (35); Lilly Mills 2/12 (4 overs)		Sophie Devine 44* (42); Chloe Tryon 1/8 (1 over)

Perth Scorchers won by 9 wickets (with 31 balls remaining)
Blacktown ISP Oval, Sydney
Umpires: Daniel Moran and Roberto Howard
Player of the match: Sophie Devine (Perth Scorchers)

- Sydney Thunder won the toss and elected to bat.
- Broadcast by cricket.com.au and Foxtel

Match 10
18 October 2022
19:05 (N)
Scorecard

Hobart Hurricanes; 7/144 (20 overs)	v	Sydney Thunder; 95 (18.1 overs)
Lizelle Lee 41 (29); Sammy-Jo Johnson 3/34 (4 overs)		Phoebe Litchfield 28 (21); Heather Graham 2/13 (3.1 overs)

Hobart Hurricanes won by 49 runs
Blacktown ISP Oval, Sydney
Umpires: Andrew Hamilton and Daniel Moran
Player of the match: Lizelle Lee (Hobart Hurricanes)

- Sydney Thunder won the toss and elected to field.
- Broadcast by cricket.com.au and Foxtel

Match 14
22 October 2022
14:30
Scorecard

Sydney Thunder; 4/166 (20 overs)	v	Perth Scorchers; 9/141 (20 overs)
Tammy Beaumont 77* (59); Alana King 1/22 (2 overs)		Marizanne Kapp 32 (23); Lauren Smith 5/17 (4 overs)

Sydney Thunder won by 25 runs
WACA Ground, Perth
Umpires: Ashlee Gibbons and Jarryd Buscall
Player of the match: Lauren Smith (Sydney Thunder)

- Perth Scorchers won the toss and elected to field.
- Broadcast by cricket.com.au and Foxtel

Match 15
23 October 2022
13:40
Scorecard

Sydney Thunder; 1/102 (13.4 overs)	v	Melbourne Stars
Phoebe Litchfield 50* (34)

No result
WACA Ground, Perth
Umpires: Jamie Thomas and Sue Redfern

- Melbourne Stars won the toss and elected to field.
- Broadcast by Seven Network and Foxtel
- Match reduced to 17 overs due to rain. No further play was possible due to rain.

Match 18
25 October 2022
18:15 (D/N)
Scorecard

Sydney Thunder; 7/139 (20 overs)	v	Brisbane Heat; 5/120 (17.2 overs)
Phoebe Litchfield 50 (38); Jess Jonassen 2/20 (4 overs)		Georgia Redmayne 33 (36); Lea Tahuhu 3/31 (4 overs)

Brisbane Heat won by 3 runs (DLS method)
Allan Border Field, Brisbane
Umpires: Benjamin Farrell and Tom Logan
Player of the match: Amelia Kerr (Brisbane Heat)

- Sydney Thunder won the toss and elected to bat.
- Brisbane Heat were set a revised target of 118 runs from 17.2 overs.
- Broadcast by cricket.com.au and Foxtel

Match 25
31 October 2022
15:00
Scorecard

Sydney Thunder; 2/79 (13.5 overs)	v	Melbourne Stars
Amy Jones 38 (35); Annabel Sutherland 1/7 (1.5 overs)

No result
Eastern Oval, Ballarat
Umpires: Daryl Brigham and Gaurav Bawa

- Melbourne Stars won the toss and elected to field.
- No further play was possible due to rain.
- Broadcast by cricket.com.au and Foxtel

Match 27
2 November 2022
19:05 (N)
Scorecard

Sydney Sixers; 6/163 (20 overs)	v	Sydney Thunder; 7/148 (20 overs)
Ashleigh Gardner 53 (37); Lauren Smith 2/22 (3 overs)		Rachael Haynes 37 (29); Lauren Cheatle 3/21 (4 overs)

Sydney Sixers won by 15 runs
North Sydney Oval, Sydney
Umpires: Andrew Hamilton and Roberto Howard
Player of the match: Ashleigh Gardner (Sydney Sixers)

- Sydney Sixers won the toss and elected to bat.
- Broadcast by cricket.com.au and Foxtel
- Venue changed from Blacktown ISP Oval to North Sydney Oval

Match 29
4 November 2022
15:30
Scorecard

Brisbane Heat; 3/163 (20 overs)	v	Sydney Thunder; 9/149 (20 overs)
Grace Harris 74 (54); Belinda Vakarewa 3/21 (4 overs)		Sammy-Jo Johnson 41 (41); Jess Jonassen 3/20 (4 overs)

Brisbane Heat won by 14 runs
Blundstone Arena, Hobart
Umpires: Jeremiah Matibiri and Simon Burns
Player of the match: Grace Harris (Brisbane Heat)

- Brisbane Heat won the toss and elected to bat.
- Broadcast by cricket.com.au and Foxtel

Match 33
6 November 2022
13:40
Scorecard

Sydney Thunder; 6/121 (20 overs)	v	Melbourne Renegades; 5/122 (18 overs)
Amy Jones 53 (48); Ella Hayward 2/14 (4 overs)		Sophie Molineux 55* (45); Hannah Darlington 2/22 (3 overs)

Melbourne Renegades won by 5 wickets (with 12 balls remaining)
Blundstone Arena, Hobart
Umpires: Eloise Sheridan and Muhammad Qureshi
Player of the match: Sophie Molineux (Melbourne Renegades)

- Sydney Thunder won the toss and elected to bat.
- Broadcast by Seven Network and Foxtel

Match 44
13 November 2022
15:00
Scorecard

Adelaide Strikers; 3/92 (14.3 overs)	v	Sydney Thunder
Katie Mack 29 (28); Samantha Bates 1/10 (2.3 overs)

No result
Centennial Park Oval, Nuriootpa
Umpires: Dhaval Bhatt and Kurt Miegel

- Sydney Thunder won the toss and elected to field.
- No further play was possible due to rain.
- Broadcast by cricket.com.au and Foxtel

Match 47
15 November 2022
19:10 (N)
Scorecard

Sydney Thunder; 95 (20 overs)	v	Melbourne Renegades; 2/98 (14.2 overs)
Tahlia Wilson 20 (27); Georgia Prestwidge 3/22 (4 overs)		Hayley Matthews 46* (40); Lauren Smith 1/12 (3 overs)

Melbourne Renegades won by 8 wickets (with 34 balls remaining)
Manuka Oval, Canberra
Umpires: Andrew Crozier and Dinusha Bandara
Player of the match: Georgia Prestwidge (Melbourne Renegades)

- Melbourne Renegades won the toss and elected to field.
- Broadcast by cricket.com.au and Foxtel

Match 51
18 November 2022
19:05 (N)
Scorecard

Sydney Sixers; 6/178 (20 overs)	v	Sydney Thunder; 7/160 (20 overs)
Ashleigh Gardner 85 (48); Samantha Bates 3/21 (4 overs)		Tammy Beaumont 51 (32); Kate Peterson 3/27 (4 overs)

Sydney Sixers won by 18 runs
North Sydney Oval, Sydney
Umpires: Claire Polosak and Roberto Howard
Player of the match: Ashleigh Gardner (Sydney Sixers)

- Sydney Thunder won the toss and elected to field.
- Broadcast by Seven Network and Foxtel

Match 56
20 November 2022
17:15 (D/N)
Scorecard

Adelaide Strikers; 4/144 (20 overs)	v	Sydney Thunder; 118 (19.3 overs)
Laura Wolvaardt 75* (56); Hannah Darlington 2/36 (4 overs)		Tammy Beaumont 37 (27); Megan Schutt 6/19 (3.3 overs)

Adelaide Strikers won by 26 runs
North Sydney Oval, Sydney
Umpires: Roberto Howard and Sharad Patel
Player of the match: Megan Schutt (Adelaide Strikers)

- Sydney Thunder won the toss and elected to field.
- Broadcast by Seven Network and Foxtel
- Megan Schutt (Adelaide Strikers) set a new WBBL record for best bowling figures in an innings.
- Former Australian player Rachael Haynes (Sydney Thunder) made her last WBBL appearance.

== Statistics and awards ==
- Most runs: Phoebe Litchfield – 280 (16th in the league)
- Highest score in an innings: Tammy Beaumont – 77* (59) vs Perth Scorchers, 22 October November 2022
- Most wickets: Samantha Bates – 12 (equal 18th in the league)
- Best bowling figures in an innings: Lauren Smith – 5/17 (4 overs) vs Perth Scorchers, 22 October 2022
- Most catches (fielder): Samantha Bates, Rachael Haynes, Olivia Porter, Chloe Tryon – 4 each (equal 31st in the league)
- Player of the Match awards: Lauren Smith – 1
- Alex Blackwell Medal: Phoebe Litchfield
