= 2019–20 Sydney Thunder WBBL season =

Sydney Thunder
2019–20 season
- Sydney Thunder 2019–20 cap logo
- Coach: Trevor Griffin
- Captain(s): Rachael Haynes
- Home ground: Drummoyne Oval
- League: WBBL
- Record: 5–8 (6th)
- Finals: DNQ
- Leading Run Scorer: Alex Blackwell – 317
- Leading Wicket Taker: Hannah Darlington – 16
- Player of the Season: Hannah Darlington

The 2019–20 Sydney Thunder Women's season was the fifth in the team's history. Coached by Trevor Griffin and captained by Rachael Haynes, Sydney placed sixth in WBBL|05 and failed to qualify for finals. Ending with the retirement of veterans Alex Blackwell and Rene Farrell, the season marked a changing of the guard for the Thunder through the unearthing of acclaimed young talent such as Hannah Darlington and Phoebe Litchfield.

== Squad ==
Each 2019–20 squad featured 15 active players, with an allowance of up to five marquee signings including a maximum of three from overseas. Australian marquees are players who held a national women's team contract at the time of signing for their WBBL|05 team.

Personnel changes made ahead of the season included:

- Trevor Griffin was appointed to the role of head coach, replacing Joanne Broadbent.
- Rachael Haynes assumed the captaincy, taking over from Alex Blackwell.
- Nicola Carey, Maisy Gibson and Belinda Vakarewa all departed the Thunder, joining the Hobart Hurricanes.
- After four seasons as an overseas marquee, Stafanie Taylor departed the Thunder and subsequently signed with the Adelaide Strikers.
- India marquee Harmanpreet Kaur did not return for WBBL|05 due to a conflicting national team schedule.
- Nida Dar filled the team's second overseas marquee position, making her the first Pakistani woman to sign a deal with an international cricket league.
- South Africa marquee Shabnim Ismail, returning to the competition for the first time since a short inaugural season stint with the Melbourne Renegades, filled the Thunder's final overseas player slot.

Changes made during the season included:

- On 1 November, Penrith batter Samantha Arnold was added to the squad as a local replacement player for an injured Kate Peterson (concussion).
- On 26 November, Olivia Porter was added to the squad as a local replacement player for Nida Dar who missed the end of the season due to national team commitments.

The table below lists the Thunder players and their key stats (including runs scored, batting strike rate, wickets taken, economy rate, catches and stumpings) for the season.

No.	Name	Nat.	Birth date	Batting style	Bowling style	G	R	SR	W	E	C	S	Notes
Batters
	Samantha Arnold	(Australia)		Right-handed	Right-arm medium	–	–	–	–	–	–	–	Local replacement player
2	Alex Blackwell	(Australia)	31 August 1983	Right-handed	Right-arm medium	13	317	108.56	–	–	2	–	
15	Rachael Haynes	(Australia)	26 December 1986	Left-handed	Left-arm medium	12	166	85.56	–	–	2	–	Captain, Australian marquee
36	Phoebe Litchfield	(Australia)	18 April 2003	Left-handed	–	11	187	96.89	–	–	3	–	
10	Naomi Stalenberg	(Australia)	18 April 1994	Right-handed	Right-arm medium	10	200	111.11	–	–	4	–	
All-rounders
23	Saskia Horley	(Australia)	23 February 2000	Right-handed	Right-arm off spin	4	27	108.00	0	10.00	0	–	
33	Kate Peterson	(Australia)		Right-handed	Right-arm medium fast	–	–	–	–	–	–	–	
14	Olivia Porter	(Australia)	14 November 2001	Right-handed	Right-arm medium	–	–	–	–	–	–	–	Local replacement player
8	Rachel Trenaman	(Australia)	18 April 2001	Right-handed	Right-arm leg spin	2	21	190.90	0	13.33	0	–	
Wicket-keepers
3	Rachel Priest	(New Zealand)	13 July 1985	Right-handed	–	13	296	124.36	–	–	5	8	Overseas marquee
21	Tahlia Wilson	(Australia)	21 October 1999	Right-handed	–	5	94	87.03	–	–	1	–	
Bowlers
34	Samantha Bates	(Australia)	7 August 1992	Right-handed	Left-arm orthodox	13	5	71.42	15	7.05	4	–	
4	Nida Dar	(Pakistan)	2 January 1987	Right-handed	Right-arm off spin	11	99	89.18	13	6.87	2	–	Overseas marquee
25	Hannah Darlington	(Australia)	25 January 2002	Right-handed	Right-arm medium fast	13	81	105.19	16	6.82	3	–	
88	Rene Farrell	(Australia)	13 January 1987	Right-handed	Right-arm medium	12	77	126.22	11	7.27	2	–	
54	Lisa Griffith	(Australia)	28 August 1992	Right-handed	Right-arm medium fast	11	36	102.85	2	9.26	2	–	
89	Shabnim Ismail	(South Africa)	5 October 1988	Left-handed	Right-arm fast	13	4	44.44	10	5.88	5	–	Overseas marquee

== Ladder ==
Pos	Team	Pld	W	L	NR	Pts	NRR
1	Brisbane Heat (C)	14	10	4	0	20	0.723
2	Adelaide Strikers (RU)	14	10	4	0	20	0.601
3	Perth Scorchers	14	9	5	0	18	0.026
4	Melbourne Renegades	14	8	6	0	16	0.117
5	Sydney Sixers	14	7	7	0	14	−0.076
6	Sydney Thunder	14	5	8	1	11	−0.487
7	Hobart Hurricanes	14	4	9	1	9	−0.197
8	Melbourne Stars	14	2	12	0	4	−0.734

- The four top ranked teams qualified for the play-off phase.

== Fixtures ==
All times are local time

Match 1
18 October 2019
19:40 (D/N)
Scorecard

Sydney Sixers; 6/192 (20 overs)	v	Sydney Thunder; 9/143 (20 overs)
Ellyse Perry 81 (48); Nida Dar 2/44 (4 overs)		Alex Blackwell 56 (38); Sarah Aley 3/28 (4 overs)

Sydney Sixers won by 49 runs
North Sydney Oval, Sydney
Attendance: 1,891
Umpires: Simon Lightbody and Marc Nickl
Player of the match: Ellyse Perry (Sydney Sixers)

- Sydney Sixers won the toss and elected to bat
- Broadcast by Seven Network and Fox Cricket

Match 6
20 October 2019
14:10
Scorecard

Brisbane Heat; 9/150 (20 overs)	v	Sydney Thunder; 3/153 (18.5 overs)
Jess Jonassen 42 (34); Samantha Bates 3/33 (4 overs)		Phoebe Litchfield 52* (48); Grace Harris 1/19 (3 overs)

Sydney Thunder won by 7 wickets (with 7 balls remaining)
North Sydney Oval, Sydney
Umpires: Troy Penman and Andrew Hamilton
Player of the match: Phoebe Litchfield (Sydney Thunder)

- Brisbane Heat won the toss and elected to bat
- Broadcast by Seven Network and Fox Cricket
- Phoebe Litchfield became the youngest player to score a half-century in the WBBL

Match 12
26 October 2019
19:00 (D/N)
Scorecard

Sydney Thunder; 8/132 (20 overs)	v	Melbourne Renegades; 8/129 (20 overs)
Rachael Haynes 36 (33); Maitlan Brown 3/22 (4 overs)		Jess Duffin 69 (56); Shabnim Ismail 3/14 (4 overs)

Sydney Thunder won by 3 runs
Blacktown International Sportspark, Sydney
Attendance: 925
Umpires: Roberto Howard and Andrew Hamilton
Player of the match: Shabnim Ismail (Sydney Thunder)

- Melbourne Renegades won the toss and elected to field
- Broadcast by Cricket Network

Match 15
27 October 2019
14:00
Scorecard

Melbourne Stars; 5/141 (20 overs)	v	Sydney Thunder; 6/142 (19.4 overs)
Elyse Villani 52 (47); Rene Farrell 1/18 (4 overs)		Alex Blackwell 45* (36); Madeline Penna 4/20 (4 overs)

Sydney Thunder won by 4 wickets (with 2 balls remaining)
Bankstown Oval, Sydney
Attendance: 606
Umpires: David Taylor and Claire Polosak
Player of the match: Alex Blackwell (Sydney Thunder)

- Sydney Thunder won the toss and elected to field
- Broadcast by Cricket Network

Match 17
2 November 2019
14:00
Scorecard

Hobart Hurricanes	v	Sydney Thunder

Match abandoned without a ball bowled
West Park Oval, Burnie
Umpires: Darren Close and G Beechey

- No toss was possible due to rain
- Broadcast by Cricket Network

Match 23
3 November 2019
11:00
Scorecard

Hobart Hurricanes; 6/148 (20 overs)	v	Sydney Thunder; 4/149 (18.1 overs)
Heather Knight 77 (49); Nida Dar 2/16 (4 overs)		Rachel Priest 50 (34); Maisy Gibson 2/28 (4 overs)

Sydney Thunder won by 6 wickets (with 11 balls remaining)
West Park Oval, Burnie
Umpires: Darren Close and Simon Burns
Player of the match: Rachel Priest (Sydney Thunder)

- Sydney Thunder won the toss and elected to field
- Broadcast by Cricket Network

Match 27
10 November 2019
10:00
Scorecard

Perth Scorchers; 5/151 (20 overs)	v	Sydney Thunder; 6/144 (20 overs)
Natalie Sciver 37 (22); Hannah Darlington 2/24 (4 overs)		Tahlia Wilson 47* (39); Heather Graham 3/22 (4 overs)

Perth Scorchers won by 7 runs
Karen Rolton Oval, Adelaide
Umpires: Harry Singh and Mary Waldron
Player of the match: Heather Graham (Perth Scorchers)

- Sydney Thunder won the toss and elected to field
- Broadcast by Cricket Network

Match 30
12 November 2019
17:30 (D/N)
Scorecard

Perth Scorchers; 6/116 (20 overs)	v	Sydney Thunder; 105 (19.4 overs)
Nat Sciver 27 (26); Rene Farrell 2/24 (4 overs)		Nida Dar 43 (39); Kim Garth 3/21 (4 overs)

Perth Scorchers won by 11 runs
WACA Ground, Perth
Umpires: Dean Trigg and James Hewitt
Player of the match: Nat Sciver (Perth Scorchers)

- Sydney Thunder won the toss and elected to field
- Broadcast by Cricket Network

Match 33
15 November 2019
19:10 (D/N)
Scorecard

Sydney Sixers; 3/152 (20 overs)	v	Sydney Thunder; 8/112 (20 overs)
Ellyse Perry 81 (70); Samantha Bates 1/20 (4 overs)		Rene Farrell 23 (16); Sarah Aley 2/16 (4 overs)

Sydney Sixers won by 40 runs
Drummoyne Oval, Sydney
Attendance: 1,517
Umpires: Ben Treloar and Marc Nickl
Player of the match: Ellyse Perry (Sydney Sixers)

- Sydney Thunder won the toss and elected to field
- Broadcast by Seven Network and Fox Cricket

Match 34
16 November 2019
19:10 (D/N)
Scorecard

Brisbane Heat; 8/128 (20 overs)	v	Sydney Thunder; 96 (19.1 overs)
Laura Harris 30 (22); Nida Dar 2/15 (4 overs)		Tahlia Wilson 19 (27); Jess Jonassen 4/13 (4 overs)

Brisbane Heat won by 32 runs
Drummoyne Oval, Sydney
Attendance: 921
Umpires: Troy Penman and Marc Nickl
Player of the match: Amelia Kerr (Brisbane Heat)

- Sydney Thunder won the toss and elected to field
- Broadcast by Seven Network and Fox Cricket

Match 40
20 November 2019
14:30
Scorecard

Sydney Thunder; 4/112 (20 overs)	v	Adelaide Strikers; 4/113 (19.1 overs)
Rachael Haynes 33 (27); Amanda-Jade Wellington 1/10 (2 overs)		Sophie Devine 62* (58); Nida Dar 2/21 (4 overs)

Adelaide Strikers won by 6 wickets (with 5 balls remaining)
North Dalton Park, Wollongong
Attendance: 892
Umpires: Andrew Hamilton and Bede Sajowitz
Player of the match: Sophie Devine (Adelaide Strikers)

- Sydney Thunder won the toss and elected to bat
- Broadcast by Cricket Network

Match 46
24 November 2019
10:00
Scorecard

Adelaide Strikers; 6/161 (20 overs)	v	Sydney Thunder; 6/161 (20 overs)
Sophie Devine 88 (56); Hannah Darlington 3/29 (4 overs)		Rachel Priest 48 (20); Amanda-Jade Wellington 3/17 (4 overs)

Adelaide Strikers won in a super over
Blundstone Arena, Hobart
Umpires: Muhammad Qureshi and Jeremiah Matibiri
Player of the match: Sophie Devine (Adelaide Strikers)

- Sydney Thunder won the toss and elected to field
- Broadcast by Cricket Network
- Adelaide Strikers qualified for finals

Match 49
27 November 2019
14:30
Scorecard

Sydney Thunder; 6/162 (20 overs)	v	Melbourne Stars; 5/144 (20 overs)
Alex Blackwell 65 (47); Annabel Sutherland 2/31 (4 overs)		Mignon du Preez 55 (50); Rene Farrell 2/28 (4 overs)

Sydney Thunder won by 18 runs
Manuka Oval, Canberra
Umpires: Andrew Scotford and Andrew Crozier
Player of the match: Alex Blackwell (Sydney Thunder)

- Melbourne Stars won the toss and elected to field
- Broadcast by Cricket Network

Match 53
1 December 2019
10:40
Scorecard

Melbourne Renegades; 6/151 (20 overs)	v	Sydney Thunder; 7/122 (20 overs)
Jess Duffin 53 (44); Samantha Bates 3/21 (4 overs)		Naomi Stalenberg 28 (30); Molly Strano 3/26 (4 overs)

Melbourne Renegades won by 29 runs
CitiPower Centre, Melbourne
Umpires: Claire Polosak and Mattis van Eck
Player of the match: Molly Strano (Melbourne Renegades)

- Sydney Thunder won the toss and elected to field
- Broadcast by Seven Network and Fox Cricket
- Melbourne Renegades qualified for finals, Sydney Sixers eliminated from finals contention
- Former Australian players Alex Blackwell and Rene Farrell made their last WBBL appearances

== Statistics and awards ==
- Most runs: Alex Blackwell – 317 (17th in the league)
- Highest score in an innings: Alex Blackwell – 65 (47) vs Melbourne Stars, 27 November
- Most wickets: Hannah Darlington – 16 (equal 8th in the league)
- Best bowling figures in an innings: Shabnim Ismail – 3/14 (4 overs) vs Melbourne Renegades, 26 October
- Most catches (fielder): Shabnim Ismail – 5 (equal 14th in the league)
- Player of the Match awards:
  - Alex Blackwell – 2
  - Shabnim Ismail, Phoebe Litchfield, Rachel Priest – 1 each
- Alex Blackwell Medal: (Note: Thunder Player of the Tournament) Hannah Darlington
- WBBL|05 Young Gun Award: Hannah Darlington (winner), Phoebe Litchfield (nominated), Tahlia Wilson (nominated)
