= 2024–25 Sydney Thunder WBBL season =

Women's Big Bash Cricket season

Sydney Thunder
2024–25 season
- Coach: Lisa Keightley
- Captain(s): Phoebe Litchfield
- Home ground: Drummoyne Oval
- League: WBBL

The 2024–25 Sydney Thunder Women's season was the team's 10th season of the Women's Big Bash League. They were coached by Lisa Keightley and captained by Phoebe Litchfield. The team finished the regular season in 3rd and lost the Challenger Final to the Brisbane Heat.

== Squads ==
The 2024–25 season saw the second WBBL Draft held on 1 September 2024 for overseas players. One international pre-signing per team was allowed to combat availability issues.

- Chamari Athapaththu was pre-signed by the Thunder, while English pair Heather Knight and Georgia Adams were also selected in the draft along with South African Shabnim Ismail, who had played for the Hobart Hurricanes the previous season.
- Georgia Voll moved to the Thunder from the Brisbane Heat.
- Taneale Peschel moved to the Thunder from the Perth Scorchers.
- Ella Briscoe and Sienna Eve were the other new domestic signings for the Thunder, earning their first WBBL contracts.
- Paris Bowdler was signed as a local replacement player.
- South African all-rounder Marizanne Kapp moved to the Melbourne Stars.
- Lauren Smith departed the club to the Hobart Hurricanes.
- Ebony Hoskin departed to the Perth Scorchers.
- English international Lauren Bell was not re-signed, along with domestic player Olivia Porter.

2024-25 Sydney Thunder squad:

- Players with international caps are listed in **bold**.

No.	Name	Nat.	Birth date	Batting style	Bowling style	Notes
Batters
55	**Georgia Adams**	(England)	4 October 1993	Right-handed	Right-arm off spin	Overseas Draft Pick (Bronze)
99	**Chamari Athapaththu**	(Sri Lanka)	9 February 1990	Left-handed	Right-arm off spin	Overseas Draft Pick (Silver)
5	**Heather Knight**	(England)	26 December 1990	Right-handed	Right-arm off spin	Overseas Draft Pick (Platinum)
4	Anika Learoyd	(Australia)	14 April 2002	Right-handed	Right-arm leg spin	
18	**Phoebe Litchfield**	(Australia)	18 April 2003	Left-handed	Right-arm leg spin	Captain
13	Georgia Voll	(Australia)	5 August 2003	Right-handed	Right-arm off spin	
All-rounders
35	Ella Briscoe	(Australia)	2 September 2005	Right-handed	Right-arm medium fast	
25	**Hannah Darlington**	(Australia)	25 January 2002	Right-handed	Right-arm medium	
19	Sienna Eve	(Australia)	18 February 2005	Right-handed	Left-arm orthodox	
23	Saskia Horley	(Australia)	23 February 2000	Right-handed	Right-arm off spin	
58	Sammy-Jo Johnson	(Australia)	5 November 1992	Right-handed	Right-arm medium fast	
85	Claire Moore	(Australia)	28 October 2003	Right-handed	Right-arm medium fast	
Wicket-keepers
12	Paris Bowdler	(Australia)	24 October 2004	Right-handed	–	Local Replacement Player
21	Tahlia Wilson	(Australia)	21 October 1999	Right-handed	–	
Bowlers
34	Samantha Bates	(Australia)	17 August 1992	Right-handed	Left-arm orthodox	
89	**Shabnim Ismail**	(South Africa)	5 October 1988	Left-handed	Right-arm fast	Overseas Draft Pick (Gold)
6	Taneale Peschel	(Australia)	29 August 1994	Right-handed	Right-arm medium	

== Standing ==
Pos	Team	Pld	W	L	T	NR	Pts	NRR	
1	Melbourne Renegades (C)	10	7	3	0	0	14	0.527	Advance to the play-off phase
2	Brisbane Heat (R)	10	7	3	0	0	14	0.384	Advance to the play-off phase
3	Sydney Thunder (3rd)	10	6	3	0	1	13	−0.002	Advance to the play-off phase
4	Hobart Hurricanes (4th)	10	5	5	0	0	10	0.189	Advance to the play-off phase
5	Perth Scorchers	10	4	5	1	0	9	−0.171	
6	Sydney Sixers	10	3	5	1	1	8	−0.477	
7	Adelaide Strikers	10	3	6	0	1	7	−0.357	
8	Melbourne Stars	10	2	7	0	1	5	−0.205	

Source: ESPNcricinfo
(C) Champions; (R) Runners-up
