= 2018–19 Sydney Thunder WBBL season =

Sydney Thunder
2018–19 season
- Sydney Thunder 2018–19 cap logo
- Coach: Joanne Broadbent
- Captain(s): Alex Blackwell
- Home ground: Spotless Stadium
- League: WBBL
- Record: 9–4 (2nd)
- Finals: Semi-finalists
- Leading Run Scorer: Rachael Haynes – 376
- Leading Wicket Taker: Stafanie Taylor – 19
- Player of the Season: Rachel Priest

The 2018–19 Sydney Thunder Women's season was the fourth in the team's history. Coached by Joanne Broadbent and captained by Alex Blackwell, the Thunder finished second in the regular season of WBBL|04 and qualified for the playoffs. In an "incredible" semi-final, notable for a catch taken by Haidee Birkett on the last ball of the game to dismiss Nicola Carey, Sydney suffered a four-run defeat at the hands of the Brisbane Heat and were consequently eliminated from the tournament. It was thus the second-straight year in which they lost a knockout game to a lower-ranked opponent.

== Squad ==
Each 2018–19 squad featured 15 active players, with an allowance of up to five marquee signings including a maximum of three from overseas. Under a new rule, Australian marquees were classed as players who held a national women's team contract at the time of signing on for their WBBL|04 team.

The Thunder made just one change to their squad from the previous season, adding Saskia Horley as their only new inclusion. Indian marquee Harmanpreet Kaur returned for her third campaign with the Thunder, but she was unavailable to play the first match and the semi-final due to national team commitments. In November 2019, the recurring issue of conflicting schedules with overseas players prompted newly appointed Cricket Australia board member Mel Jones to call for greater cooperation between nations to give the league a clearer window.

The table below lists the Thunder players and their key stats (including runs scored, batting strike rate, wickets taken, economy rate, catches and stumpings) for the season.

No.	Name	Nat.	Birth date	Batting style	Bowling style	G	R	SR	W	E	C	S	Notes
Batters
2	Alex Blackwell	(Australia)	31 August 1983	Right-handed	Right-arm medium	15	301	122.35	–	–	2	–	Captain, Australian marquee
15	Rachael Haynes	(Australia)	26 December 1986	Left-handed	Left-arm medium	13	376	114.63	–	–	1	–	Australian marquee
45	Harmanpreet Kaur	(India)	8 March 1989	Right-handed	Right-arm off spin	13	310	126.53	3	8.66	7	–	Overseas marquee
10	Naomi Stalenberg	(Australia)	18 April 1994	Right-handed	Right-arm medium	15	244	91.04	–	–	5	–	
All-rounders
5	Nicola Carey	(Australia)	10 September 1993	Left-handed	Right-arm medium	15	104	131.64	15	7.34	8	–	
23	Saskia Horley	(Australia)	23 February 2000	Right-handed	Right-arm off spin	–	–	–	–	–	–	–	
24	Stafanie Taylor	(Jamaica)	11 June 1991	Right-handed	Right-arm off spin	15	212	108.71	19	6.91	7	–	Overseas marquee
8	Rachel Trenaman	(Australia)	18 April 2001	Right-handed	Right-arm leg spin	5	12	133.33	3	6.22	0	–	
Wicket-keeper
3	Rachel Priest	(New Zealand)	13 July 1985	Right-handed	–	15	338	134.12	–	–	4	6	Overseas marquee
Bowlers
34	Samantha Bates	(Australia)	7 August 1992	Right-handed	Left-arm orthodox	15	–	–	9	6.31	3	–	
25	Hannah Darlington	(Australia)	25 January 2002	Right-handed	Right-arm medium	–	–	–	–	–	–	–	
88	Rene Farrell	(Australia)	13 January 1987	Right-handed	Right-arm medium	10	33	157.14	14	7.20	0	–	
13	Maisy Gibson	(Australia)	14 September 1996	Left-handed	Right-arm leg spin	12	5	71.42	12	7.30	5	–	
54	Lisa Griffith	(Australia)	28 August 1992	Right-handed	Right-arm medium fast	12	–	–	9	6.90	0	–	
47	Belinda Vakarewa	(Australia)	22 January 1998	Right-handed	Right-arm medium fast	10	–	–	3	6.91	2	–	

== Ladder ==
Pos	Team	Pld	W	L	NR	Pts	NRR
1	Sydney Sixers (RU)	14	10	4	0	20	0.509
2	Sydney Thunder	14	9	4	1	19	0.479
3	Brisbane Heat (C)	14	9	5	0	18	1.118
4	Melbourne Renegades	14	7	6	1	15	−0.079
5	Perth Scorchers	14	7	7	0	14	−0.476
6	Adelaide Strikers	14	5	8	1	11	−0.336
7	Melbourne Stars	14	5	8	1	11	−0.905
8	Hobart Hurricanes	14	2	12	0	4	−0.364

- The four top ranked teams qualified for the play-off phase

== Fixtures ==
All times are local time

=== Regular season ===
Match 4
2 December 2018
13:50
Scorecard

Melbourne Renegades; 8/98 (20 overs)	v	Sydney Thunder; 4/99 (16.5 overs)
Erica Kershaw 24 (27); Rene Farrell 3/17 (4 overs)		Rachael Haynes 27 (25); Tayla Vlaeminck 4/29 (3.5 overs)

Sydney Thunder won by 6 wickets (with 19 balls remaining)
CitiPower Centre, St Kilda
Umpires: Greg Azzopardi and David Shepard
Player of the match: Rene Farrell (Sydney Thunder)

- Sydney Thunder won the toss and elected to field
- Broadcast by Seven Network and Fox Cricket

Match 9
8 December 2018
19:10 (D/N)
Scorecard

Sydney Sixers; 4/168 (20 overs)	v	Sydney Thunder; 7/132 (20 overs)
Ellyse Perry 75* (66); Stafanie Taylor 2/16 (3 overs)		Harmanpreet Kaur 45 (28); Ellyse Perry 2/11 (3 overs)

Sydney Sixers won by 36 runs
North Sydney Oval No. 1
Umpires: Marc Nickl and Donovan Koch
Player of the match: Ellyse Perry (Sydney Sixers)

- Sydney Sixers won the toss and elected to bat
- Broadcast by Seven Network and Fox Cricket

Match 12
9 December 2018
14:50
Scorecard

Sydney Thunder; 4/192 (20 overs)	v	Brisbane Heat; 164 (18.5 overs)
Harmanpreet Kaur 56 (26); Sammy-Jo Johnson 2/30 (4 overs)		Grace Harris 54 (28); Maisy Gibson 3/18 (3 overs)

Sydney Thunder won by 28 runs
North Sydney Oval No. 1
Umpires: David Shepard and Marc Nickl
Player of the match: Harmanpreet Kaur (Sydney Thunder)

- Sydney Thunder won the toss and elected to bat
- Broadcast by Seven Network and Fox Cricket

Match 14
15 December 2018
14:20
Scorecard

Adelaide Strikers; 132 (20 overs)	v	Sydney Thunder; 4/134 (17.3 overs)
Suzie Bates 79* (60); Rene Farrell 3/12 (4 overs)		Rachel Priest 58* (46); Samantha Betts 1/18 (2 overs)

Sydney Thunder won by 6 wickets (with 15 balls remaining)
Blundstone Arena, Hobart
Umpires: Darren Close and Michael Graham-Smith
Player of the match: Suzie Bates (Adelaide Strikers)

- Sydney Thunder won the toss and elected to field
- Broadcast by Seven Network and Fox Cricket

Match 17
16 December 2018
10:10
Scorecard

Adelaide Strikers; 5/145 (20 overs)	v	Sydney Thunder; 5/146 (18.2 overs)
Bridget Patterson 36* (40); Stafanie Taylor 2/33 (4 overs)		Stafanie Taylor 55 (42); Danielle Hazell 1/20 (3 overs)

Sydney Thunder won by 5 wickets (with 10 balls remaining)
Blundstone Arena, Hobart
Umpires: Wade Stewart and Harvey Wolff
Player of the match: Stafanie Taylor (Sydney Thunder)

- Sydney Thunder won the toss and elected to field

Match 22
21 December 2018
13:50
Scorecard

Hobart Hurricanes; 9/153 (20 overs)	v	Sydney Thunder; 4/156 (17.2 overs)
Erin Fazackerley 35 (21); Stafanie Taylor 3/24 (4 overs)		Naomi Stalenberg 55 (39); Heather Knight 2/25 (3 overs)

Sydney Thunder won by 6 wickets (with 16 balls remaining)
Manuka Oval, Canberra
Umpires: Darren Close and Andrew Crozier
Player of the match: Stafanie Taylor (Sydney Thunder)

- Sydney Thunder won the toss and elected to field
- Broadcast by Seven Network and Fox Cricket

Match 29
24 December
14:15
Scorecard

Hobart Hurricanes; 135 (19.4 overs)	v	Sydney Thunder; 4/136 (16.4 overs)
Smriti Mandhana 35 (22); Rene Farrell 2/20 (3.4 overs)		Rachael Haynes 68* (48); Brooke Hepburn 1/13 (3 overs)

Sydney Thunder won by 6 wickets (with 20 balls remaining)
Spotless Stadium, Sydney
Umpires: Ryan Nelson and Andrew Hamilton
Player of the match: Rachael Haynes (Sydney Thunder)

- Sydney Thunder won the toss and elected to field

Match 33
29 December
10:00
Scorecard

Sydney Thunder; 5/179 (20 overs)	v	Perth Scorchers; 4/180 (19.5 overs)
Rachael Haynes 50 (40); Piepa Cleary 2/28 (4 overs)		Meg Lanning 76 (40); Nicola Carey 2/35 (4 overs)

Perth Scorchers won by 6 wickets (with 1 ball remaining)
Lilac Hill Park, Perth
Umpires: Ashlee Gibbons and James Hewitt
Player of the match: Meg Lanning (Perth Scorchers)

- Perth Scorchers won the toss and elected to field
- Perth Scorchers set a new record for the highest successful run chase in a WBBL match

The Thunder were catapulted to a score of 5/179 by a late 49-run partnership between Harmanpreet Kaur and Stafanie Taylor (which included 21 runs off the 18th over against the bowling of Taneale Peschel, who had taken 1/12 in her first three overs). Eight overs into the second innings, Meg Lanning had scored 71 of the Scorchers' 83 runs. Although Lanning was run out for 76 in the tenth over, Elyse Villani went on to score 66 not out, guiding the Scorchers to a six-wicket victory with one ball remaining. In doing so, the Scorchers set a new WBBL record for highest successful run chase.

Match 35
30 December
10:00
Scorecard

Perth Scorchers; 7/127 (20 overs)	v	Sydney Thunder; 5/124 (20 overs)
Nicole Bolton 50 (41); Lisa Griffith 2/17 (3 overs)		Alex Blackwell 37 (30); Heather Graham 2/8 (3 overs)

Perth Scorchers won by 3 runs
Lilac Hill Park, Perth
Umpires: Trent Steenholdt and J Paterson
Player of the match: Nicole Bolton (Perth Scorchers)

- Sydney Thunder won the toss and elected to field

Match 40
2 January
14:50
Scorecard

Sydney Sixers; 7/98 (20 overs)	v	Sydney Thunder; 2/101 (17.4 overs)
Marizanne Kapp 40 (41); Rachel Trenaman 2/11 (4 overs)		Naomi Stalenberg 44 (50); Marizanne Kapp 1/13 (4 overs)

Sydney Thunder won by 8 wickets (with 14 balls remaining)
Spotless Stadium, Sydney
Umpires: Ryan Nelson and Ben Treloar
Player of the match: Lisa Griffith (Sydney Thunder)

- Sydney Thunder won the toss and elected to field
- Broadcast by Seven Network and Fox Cricket

Match 42
5 January
14:00
Scorecard

Sydney Thunder; 3/92 (9.2 overs)	v	Melbourne Stars
Harmanpreet Kaur 21* (16); Holly Ferling 2/25 (3 overs)

No result
Blacktown International Sportspark, Sydney
Umpires: T Penman and Marc Nickl

- Sydney Thunder won the toss and elected to bat
- Match abandoned due to rain

Match 45
6 January
14:00
Scorecard

Sydney Thunder; 6/122 (20 overs)	v	Melbourne Stars; 9/117 (20 overs)
Nicola Carey 39* (32); Annabel Sutherland 2/17 (4 overs)		Angela Reakes 33 (38); Maisy Gibson 3/22 (4 overs)

Sydney Thunder won by 5 runs
Bankstown Oval, Sydney
Umpires: T Penman and Roberto Howard
Player of the match: Nicola Carey (Sydney Thunder)

- Melbourne Stars won the toss and elected to field

Match 47
8 January
13:50
Scorecard

Melbourne Renegades; 4/139 (20 overs)	v	Sydney Thunder; 4/141 (19.1 overs)
Danni Wyatt 59 (53); Nicola Carey 2/25 (3 overs)		Alex Blackwell 66* (48); Lea Tahuhu 1/23 (4 overs)

Sydney Thunder won by 6 wickets (with 5 balls remaining)
Spotless Stadium, Sydney
Umpires: T Penman and Donovan Koch
Player of the match: Alex Blackwell (Sydney Thunder)

- Sydney Thunder won the toss and elected to field
- Broadcast by Seven Network and Fox Cricket

Match 53
12 January
18:15
Scorecard

Sydney Thunder; 7/171 (20 overs)	v	Brisbane Heat; 7/172 (19.3 overs)
Rachael Haynes 57 (51); Delissa Kimmince 2/23 (4 overs)		Beth Mooney 102 (55); Harmanpreet Kaur 2/23 (3 overs)

Brisbane Heat won by 3 wickets (with 3 balls remaining)
Cazaly's Stadium, Cairns
Attendance: 4,673
Umpires: Donovan Koch and Stephen Dionysius
Player of the match: Beth Mooney (Brisbane Heat)

- Brisbane Heat won the toss and elected to field

Responding to the Thunder's first innings total of 7/171, Heat opener Beth Mooney recorded her maiden WBBL century but was then dismissed in the 17th over. With Brisbane still requiring 19 runs off the last twelve balls, Harmanpreet Kaur—having already claimed two wickets, including the stumping of Mooney, for just ten runs—came on to bowl her third over. The Heat, primarily through Delissa Kimmince, scored 13 runs off the over to swing the momentum once more. Laura Harris then hit the winning runs against the bowling of Nicola Carey with three wickets in hand and three balls remaining, making it Brisbane's highest successful run chase. The result helped to set up a semi-final encounter between the two teams on the following weekend.

=== Knockout stage ===
Semi-final 1
19 January
10:40
Scorecard

Brisbane Heat; 7/140 (20 overs)	v	Sydney Thunder; 7/136 (20 overs)
Sammy-Jo Johnson 33 (25); Stafanie Taylor 1/13 (2 overs)		Rachel Priest 44 (33); Jemma Barsby 3/23 (2 overs)

Brisbane Heat won by 4 runs
Drummoyne Oval, Sydney
Umpires: David Shepard and Darren Close
Player of the match: Sammy-Jo Johnson (Brisbane Heat)

- Sydney Thunder won the toss and elected to field
- Broadcast by Seven Network and Fox Cricket

The lower-ranked Heat posted a first innings total of 7/140, recovering from 5/78 after 12 overs through an unbeaten knock of 32 from 25 by Laura Harris. After struggling through the middle overs of the run chase, a late charge by the Thunder brought the hosts back into the contest to leave a required five runs off the final delivery for victory. The last ball, sent down by spinner Jess Jonassen, was struck flat and cleanly to deep square leg by batter Nicola Carey. Jonassen immediately signalled disappointment as the ball set sail for beyond the boundary rope, therefore scoring six runs and clinching the match for Sydney... However, Brisbane fielder Haidee Birkett made enough ground in time to take a "miracle" catch just inside the field of play to knock the Thunder out of the tournament. The match, in conjunction with the other semi-final played later in the day, was hailed as a showcase of "the irrefutable rise of women's cricket" and "sport with drama, skill and unpredictability – a potent recipe for success".

== Statistics and awards ==
- Most runs: Rachael Haynes – 376 (8th in the league)
- Highest score in an innings: Rachael Haynes – 68* (48) vs Hobart Hurricanes, 24 December 2018
- Most wickets: Stafanie Taylor – 19 (equal 5th in the league)
- Best bowling figures in an innings: Rene Farrell – 3/12 (4 overs) vs Adelaide Strikers, 15 December 2018
- Most catches (fielder): Nicola Carey – 8 (equal 5th in the league)
- Player of the Match awards:
  - Stafanie Taylor – 2
  - Alex Blackwell, Nicola Carey, Rene Farrell, Lisa Griffith, Rachael Haynes, Harmanpreet Kaur – 1 each
- Alex Blackwell Medal: (Note: Thunder Player of the Tournament) Rachel Priest
- WBBL|04 Team of the Tournament: Stafanie Taylor
