= 2021–22 Adelaide Strikers WBBL season =

Women's Big Bash team

Adelaide Strikers
2021–22 season
- Adelaide Strikers 2021–22 cap logo
- Coach: Luke Williams
- Captain(s): Tahlia McGrath
- Home ground: Karen Rolton Oval
- League: WBBL
- Record: 7–6 (4th)
- Finals: Runners-up
- Leading Run Scorer: Katie Mack – 513
- Leading Wicket Taker: Amanda-Jade Wellington – 23
- Player of the Season: Katie Mack

The 2021–22 Adelaide Strikers Women's season was the seventh in the team's history. Coached by Luke Williams and captained by Tahlia McGrath, the Strikers ended the regular season of WBBL|07 in fourth place, qualifying for the knockout stage of the tournament. They proceeded to defeat the Brisbane Heat and the Melbourne Renegades in sudden death encounters to book a place in the Final against the Perth Scorchers at Perth Stadium on 27 November 2021. In the championship decider, the Strikers were defeated by 12 runs, resulting in their second runners-up finish in three seasons.

== Squad ==
Each 2021–22 squad was made up of 15 active players. Teams could sign up to five 'marquee players', with a maximum of three of those from overseas. Marquees were defined as any overseas player, or a local player who holds a Cricket Australia national contract at the start of the WBBL|07 signing period.

Personnel changes made ahead of the season included:

- New Zealand marquee Suzie Bates and Jamaican marquee Stafanie Taylor did not re-sign for the Strikers, opting to sit out of the tournament. Tahlia McGrath was appointed captain, replacing the outgoing Bates (24–21 win–loss record).
- South African marquee Dane van Niekerk signed with the Strikers, departing the Sydney Sixers and having previously played for the Melbourne Renegades.
- Jemma Barsby signed with the Strikers, departing the Perth Scorchers and having previously played for the Brisbane Heat.
- Ellie Falconer departed the Strikers, signing with the Melbourne Renegades.
- Nell Bryson-Smith signed with the Strikers, having joined the Hobart Hurricanes in WBBL|06 as a replacement player.

Squad details during the season included:

- Megan Schutt did not partake in the Tasmanian leg of the tournament, missing the Strikers' first four games while on parental leave.

The table below lists the Strikers players and their key stats (including runs scored, batting strike rate, wickets taken, economy rate, catches and stumpings) for the season.

No.	Name	Nat.	Birth date	Batting style	Bowling style	G	R	SR	W	E	C	S	Notes
Batters
2	Katie Mack	(Australia)	14 September 1993	Right-handed	Right-arm leg spin	17	513	115.28	–	–	2	–	
5	Annie O'Neil	(Australia)	18 February 1999	Right-handed	Right-arm leg spin	–	–	–	–	–	–	–	
21	Bridget Patterson	(Australia)	4 December 1994	Right-handed	Right-arm medium	17	94	125.33	–	–	11	–	
8	Madeline Penna	(Australia)	30 August 2000	Right-handed	Right-arm leg spin	14	144	121.00	0	13.00	5	–	
6	Dane van Niekerk	(South Africa)	14 May 1993	Right-handed	Right-arm leg spin	17	356	117.10	4	7.76	3	–	Overseas marquee
14	Laura Wolvaardt	(South Africa)	26 April 1999	Right-handed	–	17	381	121.33	–	–	4	–	Overseas marquee
All-rounders
12	Meagan Dixon	(Australia)	23 April 1997	Right-handed	Right-arm medium	–	–	–	–	–	–	–	
9	Tahlia McGrath	(Australia)	10 November 1995	Right-handed	Right-arm medium	17	338	114.18	12	7.04	7	–	Captain, Australian marquee
Wicket-keeper
7	Tegan McPharlin	(Australia)	7 August 1988	Right-handed	–	17	37	100.00	–	–	11	6	
Bowlers
4	Jemma Barsby	(Australia)	4 October 1995	Left-handed	Right-arm off spin	9	–	–	4	6.07	3	–	
20	Darcie Brown	(Australia)	7 March 2003	Right-handed	Right-arm fast	15	–	–	20	6.07	5	–	Australian marquee
13	Nell Bryson-Smith	(Australia)	12 February 2002	Right-handed	Left-arm orthodox spin		–	–	–	–	–	–	
15	Sarah Coyte	(Australia)	30 March 1991	Right-handed	Right-arm medium fast	17	30	130.43	16	7.07	6	–	
27	Megan Schutt	(Australia)	15 January 1993	Right-handed	Right-arm medium fast	13	0	–	13	5.37	3	–	Australian marquee
10	Amanda-Jade Wellington	(Australia)	29 May 1997	Right-handed	Right-arm leg spin	17	51	113.33	23	6.56	10	–	

== Ladder ==
Pos	Team	Pld	W	L	NR	Pts	NRR
1	Perth Scorchers (C)	14	9	3	2	20	0.649
2	Melbourne Renegades (CF)	14	8	4	2	18	−0.149
3	Brisbane Heat (EF)	14	8	5	1	17	0.517
4	Adelaide Strikers (RU)	14	7	6	1	15	0.707
5	Melbourne Stars	14	5	7	2	12	−0.385
6	Hobart Hurricanes	14	5	8	1	11	−0.258
7	Sydney Thunder	14	4	8	2	10	−0.301
8	Sydney Sixers	14	4	9	1	9	−0.704

Source: cricket.com.au, ESPN Cricinfo
- The top 4 teams advanced to the play-off phase

== Fixtures ==
All times are local

=== Regular season ===
Match 3
16 October 2021
19:05 (N)
Scorecard

Adelaide Strikers; 7/140 (20 overs)	v	Sydney Thunder; 110 (19.2 overs)
Tahlia McGrath 42 (34); Lauren Smith 2/17 (2 overs)		Corinne Hall 38 (35); Tahlia McGrath 3/17 (4 overs)

Adelaide Strikers won by 30 runs
Blundstone Arena, Hobart
Umpires: Simon Lightbody and Mattis van Eck
Player of the match: Tahlia McGrath (Adelaide Strikers)

- Sydney Thunder won the toss and elected to field.
- Broadcast by Seven Network and Foxtel
- At 19 years and 264 days, Hannah Darlington (Sydney Thunder) became the youngest player to captain a team in a WBBL match.

Match 8
20 October 2021
13:25
Scorecard

Melbourne Renegades; 6/126 (20 overs)	v	Adelaide Strikers; 2/129 (17.3 overs)
Harmanpreet Kaur 41 (37); Sarah Coyte 3/20 (4 overs)		Tahlia McGrath 50* (39); Ellie Falconer 1/14 (1 over)

Adelaide Strikers won by 8 wickets (with 15 balls remaining)
Blundstone Arena, Hobart
Umpires: Muhammad Qureshi and David Taylor
Player of the match: Tahlia McGrath (Adelaide Strikers)

- Melbourne Renegades won the toss and elected to bat.
- Broadcast by Cricket Network and Foxtel

Match 10
23 October 2021
10:15
Scorecard

Hobart Hurricanes; 5/107 (16 overs)	v	Adelaide Strikers
Mignon du Preez 39 (35); Amanda-Jade Wellington 2/16 (3 overs)

No result
Invermay Park, Launceston
Umpires: Simon Burns and Roberto Howard

- Adelaide Strikers won the toss and elected to field.
- No further play was possible due to rain.
- Broadcast by Cricket Network and Foxtel

Match 14
24 October 2021
10:15
Scorecard

Brisbane Heat; 5/104 (11 overs)	v	Adelaide Strikers; 4/99 (11 overs)
Georgia Voll 31* (17); Darcie Brown 3/28 (3 overs)		Laura Wolvaardt 54 (30); Jess Jonassen 2/17 (2 overs)

Brisbane Heat won by 5 runs
Invermay Park, Launceston
Umpires: Roberto Howard and Muhammad Qureshi
Player of the match: Laura Wolvaardt (Adelaide Strikers)

- Adelaide Strikers won the toss and elected to field.
- The match was reduced to 11 overs per side after a wet outfield delayed the start of play.
- Broadcast by Cricket Network and Foxtel
- Darcie Brown became the sixth player to take a WBBL hat-trick.

Match 23
30 October 2021
13:50
Scorecard

Perth Scorchers; 5/121 (20 overs)	v	Adelaide Strikers; 8/121 (20 overs)
Beth Mooney 36 (33); Amanda-Jade Wellington 2/12 (4 overs)		Katie Mack 24 (30); Lilly Mills 2/18 (3 overs)

Match tied
(Perth Scorchers won the Super Over)
Lilac Hill Park, Perth
Umpires: Jarryd Buscall and Nathan Johnstone
Player of the match: Beth Mooney (Perth Scorchers)

- Perth Scorchers won the toss and elected to bat.
- Broadcast by Cricket Network and Foxtel
- Super Over: Adelaide Strikers 2/9 (1 over), Perth Scorchers 0/12 (0.2 overs)

Match 26
31 October 2021
10:25
Scorecard

Adelaide Strikers; 5/160 (20 overs)	v	Melbourne Renegades; 4/162 (19.4 overs)
Dane van Niekerk 62 (47); Harmanpreet Kaur 2/31 (4 overs)		Harmanpreet Kaur 73* (46); Megan Schutt 2/18 (4 overs)

Melbourne Renegades won by 6 wickets (with 2 balls remaining)
Lilac Hill Park, Perth
Umpires: Nathan Johnstone and Jamie Thomas
Player of the match: Harmanpreet Kaur (Melbourne Renegades)

- Adelaide Strikers won the toss and elected to bat.
- Broadcast by Cricket Network and Foxtel

Match 32
6 November 2021
13:10
Scorecard

Melbourne Stars; 4/126 (14 overs)	v	Adelaide Strikers; 8/89 (14 overs)
Meg Lanning 82 (45); Dane van Niekerk 2/15 (2 overs)		Katie Mack 14* (8); Rhys McKenna 2/3 (1 over)

Melbourne Stars won by 37 runs
Karen Rolton Oval, Adelaide
Umpires: Simon Lightbody and David Taylor
Player of the match: Meg Lanning (Melbourne Stars)

- Adelaide Strikers won the toss and elected to field.
- The match was reduced to 14 overs per side due to rain.
- Broadcast by Cricket Network and Foxtel

Match 38
9 November 2021
17:30 (D/N)
Scorecard

Adelaide Strikers; 4/176 (20 overs)	v	Sydney Thunder; 6/158 (20 overs)
Dane van Niekerk 58 (46); Sammy-Jo Johnson 2/25 (4 overs)		Issy Wong 43 (17); Tahlia McGrath 2/20 (4 overs)

Adelaide Strikers won by 18 runs
Karen Rolton Oval, Adelaide
Umpires: Nathan Johnstone and Simon Lightbody
Player of the match: Laura Wolvaardt (Adelaide Strikers)

- Adelaide Strikers won the toss and elected to bat.
- Broadcast by Cricket Network and Foxtel

Match 40
10 November 2021
16:20 (D/N)
Scorecard

Sydney Sixers; 4/142 (20 overs)	v	Adelaide Strikers; 2/148 (18.4 overs)
Shafali Verma 53* (43); Darcie Brown 2/34 (4 overs)		Katie Mack 67* (55); Maitlan Brown 1/30 (4 overs)

Adelaide Strikers won by 8 wickets (with 8 balls remaining)
Karen Rolton Oval, Adelaide
Umpires: Nathan Johnstone and David Taylor
Player of the match: Katie Mack (Adelaide Strikers)

- Sydney Sixers won the toss and elected to bat.
- Broadcast by Cricket Network and Foxtel

Match 43
13 November 2021
14:40
Scorecard

Adelaide Strikers; 4/142 (20 overs)	v	Hobart Hurricanes; 94 (18.2 overs)
Dane van Niekerk 44 (38); Molly Strano 2/23 (4 overs)		Mignon du Preez 21 (24); Darcie Brown 3/19 (4 overs)

Adelaide Strikers won by 48 runs
Harrup Park, Mackay
Umpires: Steven Farrell and Simon Lightbody
Player of the match: Darcie Brown (Adelaide Strikers)

- Hobart Hurricanes won the toss and elected to field.
- Broadcast by Seven Network and Foxtel
- Hobart Hurricanes were eliminated from finals contention.

Match 45
14 November 2021
9:15
Scorecard

Brisbane Heat; 7/94 (20 overs)	v	Adelaide Strikers; 2/98 (16.2 overs)
Laura Kimmince 22* (11); Amanda-Jade Wellington 2/21 (4 overs)		Katie Mack 54* (48); Courtney Sippel 2/22 (4 overs)

Adelaide Strikers won by 8 wickets (with 22 balls remaining)
Harrup Park, Mackay
Umpires: Steven Farrell and Claire Polosak
Player of the match: Katie Mack (Adelaide Strikers)

- Brisbane Heat won the toss and elected to bat.
- Broadcast by Seven Network and Foxtel
- Jess Jonassen (Brisbane Heat) became the first player to appear in 100 WBBL matches.

Match 47
17 November 2021
10:00
Scorecard

Perth Scorchers; 3/177 (20 overs)	v	Adelaide Strikers; 5/165 (20 overs)
Beth Mooney 78 (53); Sarah Coyte 1/27 (3 overs)		Katie Mack 84* (61); Sophie Devine 2/30 (4 overs); Heather Graham 2/30 (4 overs)

Perth Scorchers won by 12 runs
Karen Rolton Oval, Adelaide
Umpires: Harsimran Singh and David Taylor
Player of the match: Beth Mooney (Perth Scorchers)

- Perth Scorchers won the toss and elected to bat.
- Broadcast by Cricket Network and Foxtel
- Start time brought forward from 15:10
- Perth Scorchers qualified for finals.

Match 52
20 November 2021
13:10
Scorecard

Sydney Sixers; 82 (19.2 overs)	v	Adelaide Strikers; 2/84 (10.2 overs)
Lauren Cheatle 16 (16); Sarah Coyte 3/12 (3.2 overs)		Dane van Niekerk 33 (22); Maitlan Brown 1/13 (2 overs)

Adelaide Strikers won by 8 wickets (with 58 balls remaining)
Adelaide Oval, Adelaide
Umpires: Harsimran Singh and David Taylor
Player of the match: Darcie Brown (Adelaide Strikers)

- Sydney Sixers won the toss and elected to bat.
- Broadcast by Seven Network and Foxtel
- Sydney Sixers were eliminated from finals contention and Adelaide Strikers qualified for finals.

Match 56
21 November 2021
13:10
Scorecard

Adelaide Strikers; 3/175 (20 overs)	v	Melbourne Stars; 1/181 (19.3 overs)
Katie Mack 89* (67); Annabel Sutherland 2/33 (4 overs)		Elyse Villani 100* (65); Megan Schutt 1/20 (4 overs)

Melbourne Stars won by 9 wickets (with 3 balls remaining)
Adelaide Oval, Adelaide
Umpires: Shawn Craig and Claire Polosak
Player of the match: Elyse Villani (Melbourne Stars)

- Adelaide Strikers won the toss and elected to bat.
- Broadcast by Seven Network and Foxtel
- Former Australian player Erin Osborne made her last WBBL appearance.

=== Eliminator ===
24 November 2021
18:40 (N)
Scorecard

Brisbane Heat; 8/114 (20 overs)	v	Adelaide Strikers; 2/118 (16.3 overs)
Nicola Hancock 40 (26); Amanda-Jade Wellington 5/8 (4 overs)		Katie Mack 50* (42); Poonam Yadav 1/19 (3 overs)

Adelaide Strikers won by 8 wickets (with 21 balls remaining)
Adelaide Oval, Adelaide
Umpires: Claire Polosak and David Taylor
Player of the match: Amanda-Jade Wellington (Adelaide Strikers)

- Adelaide Strikers won the toss and elected to field.
- Broadcast by Seven Network and Foxtel
- Amanda-Jade Wellington (Adelaide Strikers) set a new WBBL record for best bowling figures in an innings.

=== Challenger ===
25 November 2021
18:40 (N)
Scorecard

Melbourne Renegades; 8/83 (20 overs)	v	Adelaide Strikers; 1/86 (10.5 overs)
Ella Hayward 18* (23); Darcie Brown 2/9 (4 overs)		Dane van Niekerk 43 (30); Carly Leeson 1/5 (1 over)

Adelaide Strikers won by 9 wickets (with 55 balls remaining)
Adelaide Oval, Adelaide
Umpires: Simon Lightbody and Eloise Sheridan
Player of the match: Darcie Brown (Adelaide Strikers)

- Adelaide Strikers won the toss and elected to field.
- Broadcast by Seven Network and Foxtel

=== Final ===
27 November 2021
16:10 (D/N)
Scorecard

Perth Scorchers; 5/146 (20 overs)	v	Adelaide Strikers; 6/134 (20 overs)
Sophie Devine 35 (33); Tahlia McGrath 1/14 (2 overs)		Tahlia McGrath 36 (29); Taneale Peschel 2/23 (4 overs)

Perth Scorchers won by 12 runs
Perth Stadium, Perth
Attendance: 15,511
Umpires: Nathan Johnstone and Simon Lightbody
Player of the match: Marizanne Kapp (Perth Scorchers)

- Adelaide Strikers won the toss and elected to field.
- Broadcast by Seven Network and Foxtel
- The crowd of 15,511 set a new attendance record for a standalone WBBL match.
- Perth Scorchers won their first WBBL title.

== Statistics and awards ==
- Most runs: Katie Mack – 513 (2nd in the league)
- Highest score in an innings: Katie Mack – 89* (67) vs Melbourne Stars, 21 November 2021
- Most wickets: Amanda-Jade Wellington – 23 (1st in the league)
- Best bowling figures in an innings: Amanda-Jade Wellington – 5/8 (4 overs) vs Brisbane Heat, 24 November 2021
- Most catches (fielder): Bridget Patterson – 11 (1st in the league)
- Player of the Match awards:
  - Darcie Brown – 3
  - Katie Mack, Tahlia McGrath, Laura Wolvaardt – 2 each
  - Amanda-Jade Wellington – 1
- WBBL|07 Team of the Tournament: Tahlia McGrath, Amanda-Jade Wellington, Darcie Brown
- Strikers Most Valuable Player: Katie Mack
