= Jessica Davidson =

Australian cricketer (born 2003)

Personal information
- Full name: Jessica Davidson
- Born: 3 May 2003 (age 23)
- Batting: Right-handed
- Bowling: Right-arm fast-medium
- Role: Bowler

Domestic team information
- Years: Team
- 2021/22–2022/23: Sydney Thunder
- 2022/23: New South Wales

Career statistics
Competition	WLA
Matches	2
Runs scored	–
Batting average	–
100s/50s	–
Top score	–
Balls bowled	24
Wickets	1
Bowling average	34.00
5 wickets in innings	0
10 wickets in match	0
Best bowling	1/14
Catches/stumpings	0/–
- Source: CricketArchive, 2 March 2023

Jessica Davidson (born 3 May 2003) is an Australian cricketer who currently plays as a right-arm fast-medium bowler. She has played for New South Wales.

== Domestic career ==
Davidson became part of the New South Wales pathway programme at the age of 14. She was signed by Sydney Thunder as a replacement for the injured Shabnim Ismail for the 2021–22 Women's Big Bash League season, but did not play a match. She made her debut for New South Wales on 30 September 2022, against Western Australia in the WNCL, taking 1/14 from her 2 overs. She went on to play one more match for the side that season.
