= Haidee Birkett =

Australian cricketer

Personal information
- Full name: Haidee Birkett
- Born: 23 May 1996 (age 30)
- Nickname: Birky
- Batting: Right-handed
- Bowling: Left-arm medium
- Role: All-rounder

Domestic team information
- Years: Team
- 2013–: Queensland Fire (squad no. 23)
- 2016–: Sydney Thunder (squad no. 23)
- Source: Cricinfo, 18 March 2017

Haidee Birkett is an Australian cricketer who plays as an all-rounder for Queensland Fire and Brisbane Heat.

Originally from Charters Towers, Birkett played her junior cricket there and in Townsville. She has been described by coaches and teachers as a natural born leader.

Birkett was involved in two campaigns with the Queensland under-15 team, including its national championship victory in 2010–11. Subsequently, she played for the Queensland under-18 team, including as its captain, and won the Youth Player of the Year award in 2012–13.

In December 2013, Birkett made her debut for Queensland Fire. She was a member of the Fire team that won the National Women's Twenty20 competition in 2014–15. However, during the following season she suffered a run of injury, including recurring back problems, a knee operation and a broken finger.

At the start of the 2016–17 season, Birkett was signed up by Brisbane Heat for its WBBL|02 campaign. She made her Heat debut on 11 December 2016 against the Sydney Sixers, and took her first WBBL wicket by dismissing Alyssa Healy caught and bowled.

During the Heat's match on 2 January 2017 against Sydney Thunder, Birkett caused a social media sensation by taking a spectacular catch to dismiss Naomi Stalenberg, and also took 2–25 in four overs.

Birkett is a member of Queensland Cricket's Game and Market Development team. In November 2018, she was named in Brisbane Heat's squad for the 2018–19 Women's Big Bash League season.
