= Meagan Dixon =

Australian cricketer

Personal information
- Full name: Meagan Rose Dixon
- Born: 23 April 1997 (age 29); Mount Isa, Queensland, Australia
- Batting: Right-handed
- Bowling: Right-arm medium
- Role: All-rounder

Domestic team information
- Years: Team
- 2018/19–2021/22: Queensland
- 2021/22–2022/23: Adelaide Strikers
- 2022/23: Australian Capital Territory

Career statistics
Competition	WLA
Matches	6
Runs scored	24
Batting average	24.00
100s/50s	0/0
Top score	23
Balls bowled	330
Wickets	7
Bowling average	31.71
5 wickets in innings	0
10 wickets in match	0
Best bowling	3/45
Catches/stumpings	0/–
- Source: CricketArchive, 28 March 2021

Meagan Rose Dixon (born 23 April 1997) is an Australian cricketer who currently plays for Adelaide Strikers in the Women's Big Bash League (WBBL). An all-rounder, she is a right-handed batter and right-arm medium bowler. She previously played for Queensland, making her debut for the side on 11 November 2018, scoring 1* and bowling seven overs for 22 runs without taking a wicket.
