= Lisa Griffith =

Australian cricketer (born 1992)

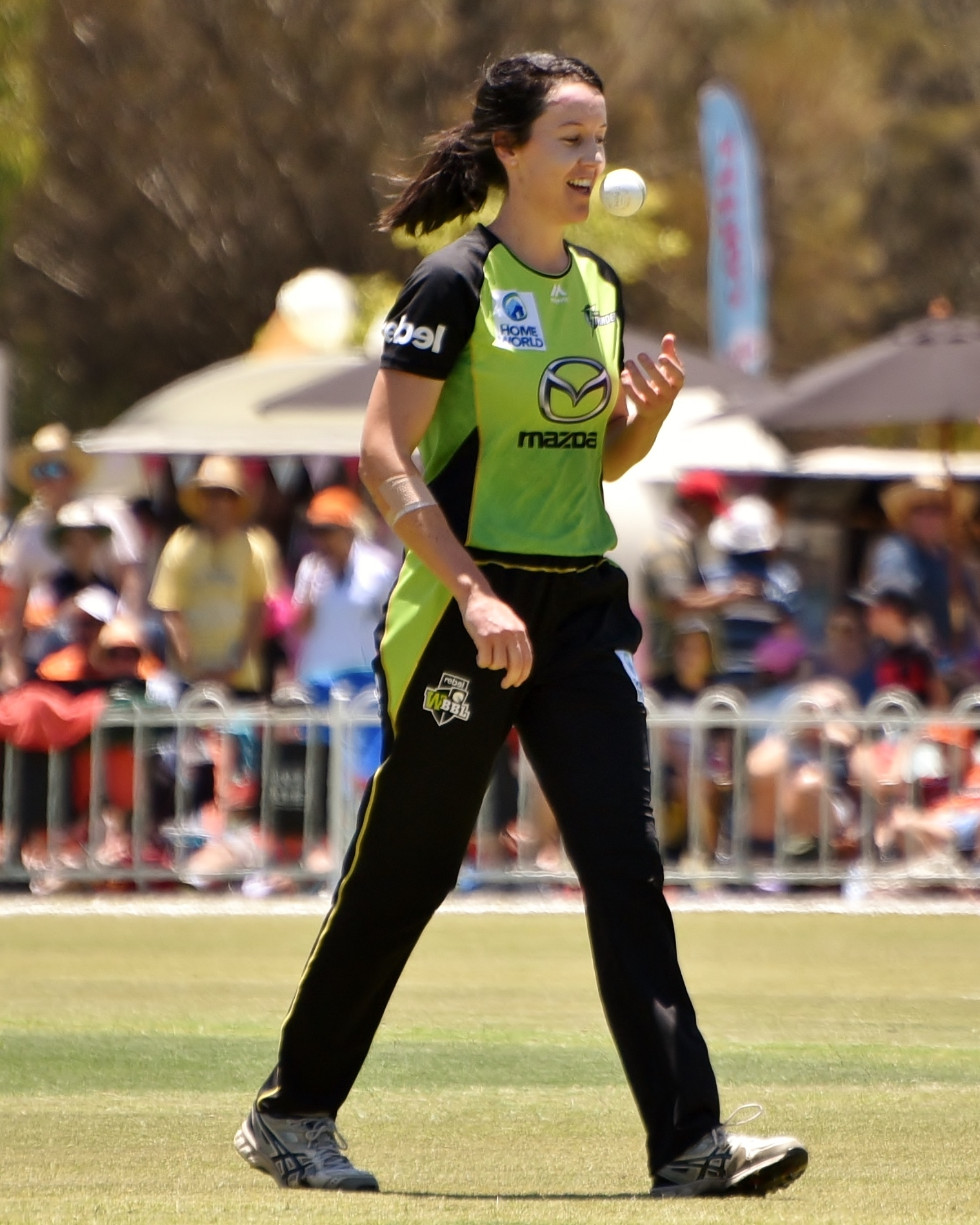
- Griffith getting ready to bowl for Sydney Thunder, 2018

Personal information
- Full name: Lisa Griffith
- Born: 28 August 1992 (age 34); Bathurst, New South Wales, Australia
- Batting: Right-handed
- Bowling: Right-arm medium
- Role: All-rounder

Domestic team information
- Years: Team
- 2010/11: New South Wales
- 2017/18–2020/21: New South Wales
- 2017/18–2019/20: Sydney Thunder
- 2018/19–2019/20: Otago
- 2020/21: Sydney Sixers
- 2021/22–present: Western Australia
- 2021/22: Perth Scorchers
- 2023/24–present: Perth Scorchers

Career statistics
Competition	WLA	WT20
Matches	36	61
Runs scored	601	177
Batting average	21.66	14.00
100s/50s	0/2	0/0
Top score	67	40
Balls bowled	258	681
Wickets	5	23
Bowling average	47.40	39.09
5 wickets in innings	0	0
10 wickets in match	–	–
Best bowling	2/44	3/10
Catches/stumpings	5/–	12/–
- Source: CricketArchive, 14 March 2021

Lisa Griffith is an Australian cricketer who plays as a right-handed batter and right-arm medium pace bowler. She made her professional debut for the New South Wales Breakers in the 2010–11 Women's National Cricket League before taking a five-year break from cricket. She worked on a family farm in her time away from the game. She returned to cricket for the 2017–18 season, joining Sydney Thunder for the Women's Big Bash League and returning to the Breakers for the Women's National Cricket League. She signed for Western Australia ahead of the 2021–22 Women's National Cricket League and Perth Scorchers ahead of the 2021–22 Women's Big Bash League.
