= Kate Peterson =

Australian cricketer

Personal information
- Full name: Kate E Peterson
- Born: 3 December 2002 (age 23)
- Batting: Right-handed
- Bowling: Right-arm fast-medium
- Role: Bowler

Domestic team information
- Years: Team
- 2019/20–2021/22: Sydney Thunder
- 2021/22–present: South Australia (squad no. 33)
- 2022/23–present: Sydney Sixers

Career statistics
Competition	WLA	WT20
Matches	39	42
Runs scored	179	133
Batting average	12.46	9.28
100s/50s	0/1	0/0
Top score	50	36*
Balls bowled	1,643	372
Wickets	41	17
Bowling average	32.76	31.59
5 wickets in innings	1	0
10 wickets in match	–	–
Best bowling	5/34	4/17
Catches/stumpings	8/–	13/–
- Source: CricketArchive, 18 February 2024

Kate E Peterson (born 3 December 2002) is an Australian cricketer who plays for South Australia in the Women's National Cricket League (WNCL) and Sydney Sixers in the Women's Big Bash League (WBBL). An all-rounder, she bowls right-arm fast-medium and bats right-handed.

Peterson joined Sydney Thunder ahead of the 2019–20 WBBL season, but had to wait until the following season to make her debut against Perth Scorchers on 4 November 2020. She did not bat or bowl in her only match for the season, which the Thunder won by 24 runs. On 18 May 2021, it was announced that she had joined South Australia ahead of the 2021–22 Women's National Cricket League season.
