= Nicola Carey =

Australian cricketer

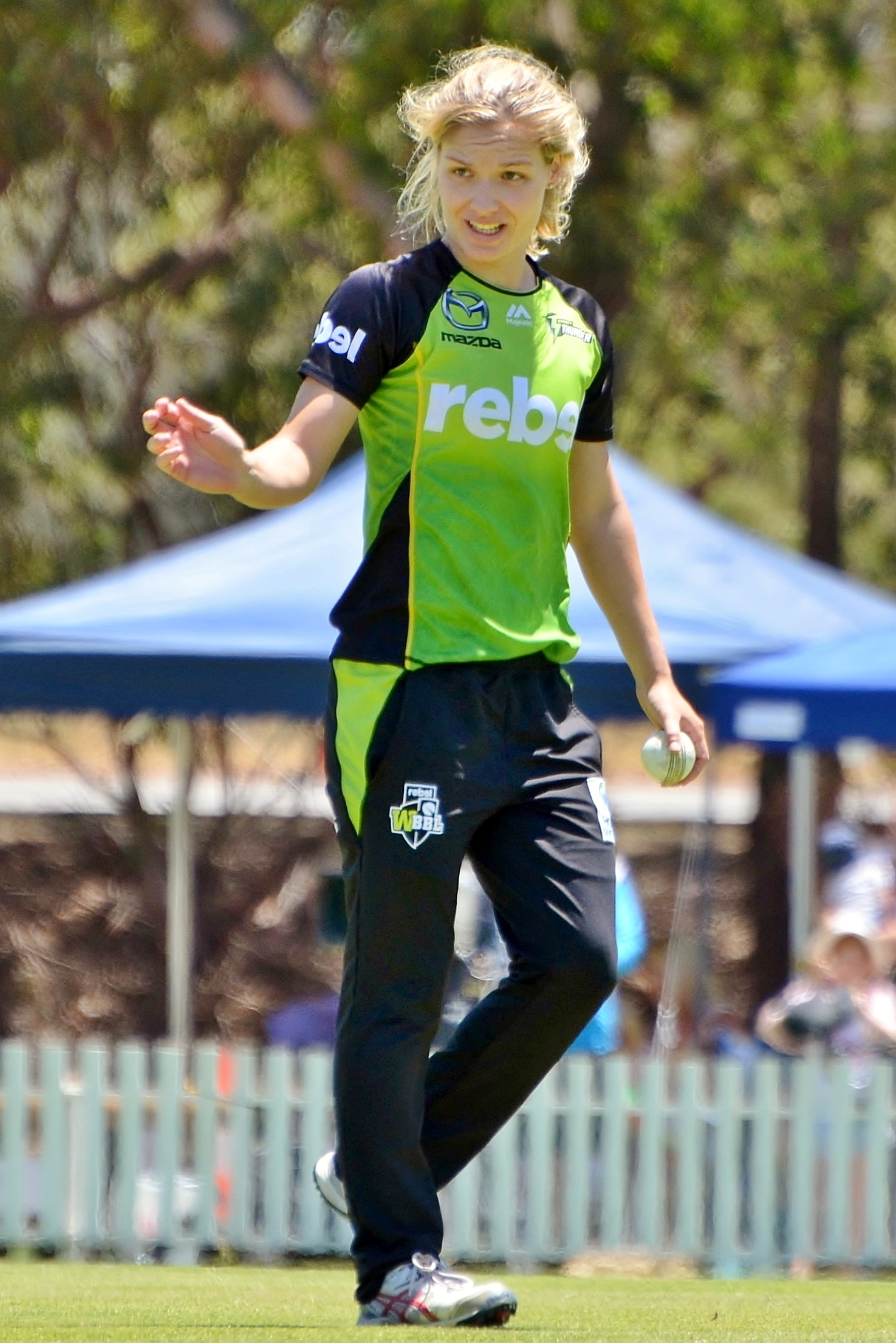
- Carey playing for the Sydney Thunder during WBBL03

Personal information
- Full name: Nicola Jane Carey
- Born: 10 September 1993 (age 33); Camperdown, New South Wales, Australia
- Height: 155 cm (5 ft 1 in)
- Batting: Left-handed
- Bowling: Right-arm medium
- Role: All-rounder

International information
- National side: Australia (2018–present)
- ODI debut (cap 137): 12 March 2018 v India
- Last ODI: 8 March 2022 v Pakistan
- ODI shirt no.: 16
- T20I debut (cap 49): 23 March 2018 v England
- Last T20I: 14 December 2022 v India

Domestic team information
- Years: Team
- 2010/11–2018/19: New South Wales
- 2015/16–2018/19: Sydney Thunder
- 2019/20–present: Hobart Hurricanes
- 2019/20–present: Tasmania
- 2022: Welsh Fire
- 2025: Northern Superchargers
- 2026–present: Mumbai Indians

Career statistics
Competition	WODI	WT20I	WLA	WT20
Matches	23	26	115	205
Runs scored	153	54	2,807	1,838
Batting average	25.50	27.00	24.41	8.97
100s/50s	0/0	0/0	5/18	0/4
Top score	39*	10*	113	77
Balls bowled	809	380	3,787	3,400
Wickets	17	18	109	172
Bowling average	32.41	23.77	24.75	23.38
5 wickets in innings	0	0	0	0
10 wickets in match	0	0	0	0
Best bowling	3/19	3/15	3/19	4/12
Catches/stumpings	8/–	15/–	34/–	57/–
Medal record
Women's Cricket
Representing Australia
Commonwealth Games
Gold medal – first place	2022 Birmingham
World Cup
Winner	2022 New Zealand
T20 World Cup
Winner	2018 West Indies
Winner	2020 Australia
Winner	2026 England & Wales
- Source: ESPNcricinfo, 23 July 2022

Nicola Jane Carey (born 10 September 1993) is an Australian cricketer who plays for the national cricket team as an all-rounder, batting left-handed and bowling right-arm medium pace. At the domestic level, she plays in the Women's National Cricket League for Tasmania and in the Women's Big Bash League for the Hobart Hurricanes. Until 2019, she played in those two competitions for the New South Wales Breakers and the Sydney Thunder, respectively.

== Career ==
Carey was a member of the victorious Southern Stars squad that won the 2012 Women's World Twenty20 title in Sri Lanka. Carey was part of two Women's T20 World Cup in 2012 and in 2016.

She made her Women's One Day International cricket (WODI) debut for Australia Women against India Women on 12 March 2018. Although she bowled well, and was praised by the team's coach, Matthew Mott, as having had "a fabulous debut", she did not take any wickets in her 10 overs, and was not required to bat. Her teammate Alyssa Healy commented that "... it was probably one of the most unlucky debuts I've ever seen."

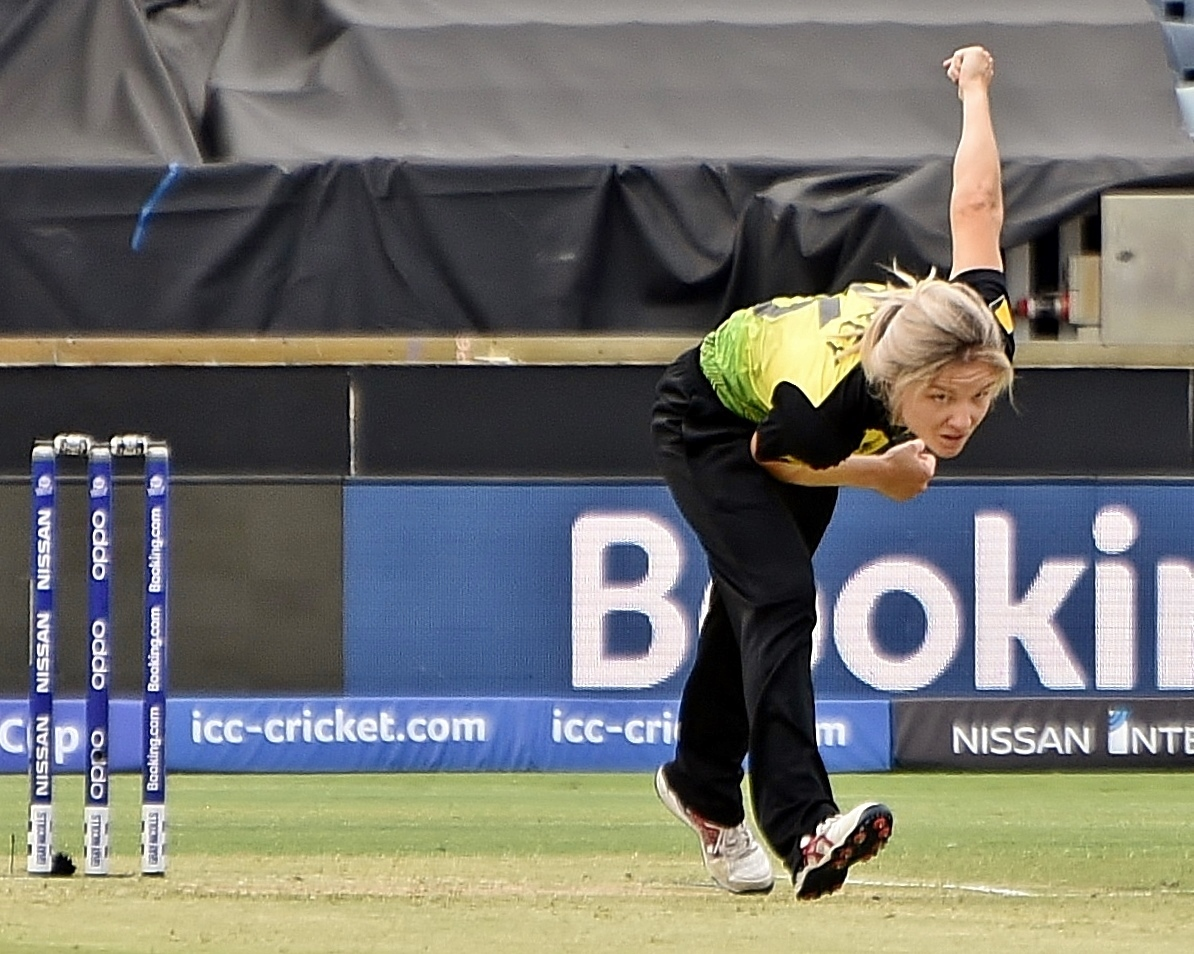
Carey bowling for Australia during the 2020 ICC Women's T20 World Cup

She made her Women's Twenty20 International cricket (WT20I) debut for Australia Women against England Women on 23 March 2018 in the 2017–18 India women's Tri-Nation Series.

In April 2018, she was one of the fourteen players to be awarded a national contract for the 2018–19 season by Cricket Australia. In October 2018, she was named in Australia's squad for the 2018 ICC Women's World Twenty20 tournament in the West Indies.

In November 2018, she was named in Sydney Thunder's squad for the 2018–19 Women's Big Bash League season. In April 2019, Cricket Australia awarded her with a contract ahead of the 2019–20 season. In June 2019, Cricket Australia named her in Australia's team for their tour to England to contest the Women's Ashes. In January 2020, she was named in Australia's squad for the 2020 ICC Women's T20 World Cup in Australia.

In August 2021, Carey was named in Australia's squad for their series against India, which included a one-off day/night Test match as part of the tour. In January 2022, Carey was named in Australia's squad for their series against England to contest the Women's Ashes. Later the same month, she was named in Australia's team for the 2022 Women's Cricket World Cup in New Zealand. In May 2022, Carey was named in Australia's team for the cricket tournament at the 2022 Commonwealth Games in Birmingham, England.
