= Sydney Thunder (WBBL) =

Australian women's Twenty20 cricket team

- League: Women's Big Bash League

Personnel
- Captain: Phoebe Litchfield
- Coach: Lisa Keightley

Team information
- City: Sydney
- Colours: Lime
- Home ground: Drummoyne Oval
- Secondary home ground(s): Blacktown ISP Oval, North Sydney Oval

History
- Twenty20 debut: 6 December 2015
- WBBL wins: 2: WBBL01, WBBL06
- Official website: Sydney Thunder
Regular kit
Indigenous kit

The Sydney Thunder are an Australian women's Twenty20 cricket team based in Sydney, New South Wales. They are one of two teams from Sydney to compete in the Women's Big Bash League, the other being the Sydney Sixers. The Thunder have claimed two WBBL titles, winning the league's inaugural championship and the 2020–21 title.

== History ==
=== Formation ===
One of eight founding WBBL teams, the Sydney Thunder are aligned with the men's team of the same name. At the official WBBL launch on 10 July 2015, Rene Farrell was unveiled as the team's first-ever player signing. Joanne Broadbent was appointed as inaugural coach, while Alex Blackwell became the inaugural captain.

The Thunder played their first game on 6 December against the Sydney Sixers at Howell Oval in Penrith, winning by nine wickets with 40 balls remaining.

=== Rivalries ===
==== Brisbane Heat ====
The Thunder have combined with the Brisbane Heat to produce several "thrillers", including:

- 12 January 2019, Cazaly's Stadium: Responding to the Thunder's first innings total of 7/171, Heat opener Beth Mooney recorded her maiden WBBL century but was then dismissed in the 17th over. With the Heat still requiring 19 runs off the last twelve balls, Harmanpreet Kaur—having already claimed two wickets, including the stumping of Mooney, for just ten runs—came on to bowl her third over. The Heat, primarily through Delissa Kimmince, scored 13 runs off the over to swing the momentum once more. Laura Harris then hit the winning runs against the bowling of Nicola Carey with three wickets in hand and three balls remaining, making it Brisbane's highest successful run chase. The result helped to set up a semi-final encounter between the two teams on the following weekend.
- 19 January 2019, Drummoyne Oval: In the WBBL|04 semi-finals, the lower-ranked Heat posted a first innings total of 7/140. After struggling through the middle overs of the run chase, a late charge by the Thunder brought them back into the contest to leave a required five runs off the final delivery for victory. The last ball, sent down by spinner Jess Jonassen, was struck flat and cleanly to deep square leg by batter Nicola Carey. Jonassen immediately signalled disappointment as the ball set sail for beyond the boundary rope, therefore scoring six runs and clinching the match for the Thunder. However, Heat fielder Haidee Birkett made enough ground in time to take a "miracle" catch just inside the field of play to knock the Thunder out of the tournament. The match, in conjunction with the other semi-final played later in the day, was hailed as a showcase of "the irrefutable rise of women's cricket" and "sport with drama, skill and unpredictability – a potent recipe for success".
- 20 October 2019, North Sydney Oval: Thunder batters Alex Blackwell and Phoebe Litchfield set a new WBBL record for highest fourth-wicket partnership in their pursuit of the Heat's 9/150. The unbeaten 97-run stand, which got the Thunder over the line with seven balls to spare, was noted for the 20-year age gap between the two batting partners. At 16 years and 185 days, Litchfield also set a new WBBL record as the youngest player to score a half-century.

==== Perth Scorchers ====
The Thunder and the Perth Scorchers have met in two semi-finals:

- 21 January 2016, Adelaide Oval: Defending a total of 6/118, the Thunder restricted the Scorchers to 9/110 and claimed victory by eight runs.
- 1 February 2018, Perth Stadium: In the first innings, the Scorchers posted a total of 2/148. The Thunder were reeling by the 11th over of the run chase, having lost five wickets for just 46 runs. Fran Wilson piled on 46 runs from 28 balls late in the match but Perth, led by Emma King's 3/17, easily defended the target to win by 27 runs.

Due to a scheduling quirk, the two teams did not meet in the Thunder's home state of New South Wales until the 2020–21 Women's Big Bash League season (when the season was played entirely in Sydney due to uncertainty surrounding state border closures during the COVID-19 pandemic). From 2017 to 2018, five of their regular season encounters were played at Lilac Hill Park and characterised by close finishes, including:

- 7 January 2018: The Scorchers were well poised to chase down their target of 146 until a catch on the boundary by Thunder fielder Lisa Griffith dismissed Nicole Bolton for 71 in the 18th over. On the last ball of the match, Scorchers batter Mathilda Carmichael was run out by a metre while attempting a game-tying run, therefore securing victory for the Thunder by the narrowest of margins.
- 29 December 2018: The Thunder were catapulted to a score of 5/179 by a late 49-run partnership between Harmanpreet Kaur and Stafanie Taylor (which included 21 runs off the 18th over against the bowling of Taneale Peschel, who had taken 1/12 in her first three overs). Eight overs into the second innings, captain Meg Lanning had scored 71 of the Scorchers' 83 runs. Although Lanning was run out for 76 in the tenth over, Elyse Villani went on to score 66 not out, guiding the Scorchers to a six-wicket victory with one ball remaining. In doing so, the Scorchers set a new WBBL record for highest successful run chase.

==== Sydney Sixers ====
At the WBBL 02 season launch, Thunder captain Alex Blackwell said the Sydney Sixers "desperately want to beat us and we desperately want to beat them. It's set up to be a really good rivalry." In a joint media conference ahead of WBBL 05, Sixers captain Ellyse Perry said she considers the Thunder "our biggest rivals" while the Thunder's Rachel Priest claimed "it was a really intense rivalry right when I started with the team". Noteworthy matches include:

- 24 January 2016, Melbourne Cricket Ground: Having lost their first six games of the season, the Sixers stormed into the WBBL|01 final by winning nine consecutive matches. Their streak would come to an end in a low-scoring championship decider plagued by "probably the worst fielding seen all tournament" from both teams. Ultimately the Thunder scraped home by three wickets with three balls remaining to claim the inaugural Women's Big Bash title. Erin Osborne earned Player of the Final honours for her bowling figures of 3/21 off four overs.
- 14 January 2017, Sydney Cricket Ground: Defending a first innings total of 138, Sixers off-spinner Lauren Smith conceded seven runs in the last over to tie the game. With scores still level after the subsequent super over, the Thunder were awarded the win on the boundary count back rule. Despite the intense rivalry between the two teams, the match was noted for a sporting gesture by Thunder captain Alex Blackwell who, suspecting she interfered with the batter, withdrew an appeal that would have led to the dismissal of the Sixers' Sara McGlashan.
- 15 November 2019, Drummoyne Oval: The Sixers cruised to a comfortable 40-run victory, having also defeated the Thunder by 49 runs in the season opener—Perry top-scoring with 81 on both occasions. This marked the first time either team would sweep their fellow Sydneysiders in the regular season.

== Captaincy records ==
There have been six captains in the Thunder's history, including matches featuring an acting captain.

Captain	Span	M	Won	Lost	Tied	NR	W–L%
Alex Blackwell	2015–2019	60	36	23	0	1	61.02
Rachael Haynes	2019–2022	42	15	22	0	5	40.54
Hannah Darlington	2021	13	4	8	0	1	33.33
Heather Knight	2023	14	7	6	0	1	53.85
Sammy-Jo Johnson	2023	1	0	1	0	0	0
Phoebe Litchfield	2024–25	22	11	9	0	2	55

== Season summaries ==
Chart of yearly table positions for Sydney Thunder in WBBL

Season	W–L	Pos.	Finals	Coach	Captain	Most Runs	Most Wickets	Most Valuable Player (Note: The player adjudged MVP for the Thunder each season is awarded the Alex Blackwell Medal)	Refs
2015–16	9–5*	1st*	C	Joanne Broadbent	Alex Blackwell	Alex Blackwell – 410	Rene Farrell – 26*	Stafanie Taylor	
2016–17	6–7	6th	DNQ	Joanne Broadbent	Alex Blackwell	Alex Blackwell – 386	Nicola Carey – 14	Harmanpreet Kaur	
2017–18	10–4	2nd	SF	Joanne Broadbent	Alex Blackwell	Rachael Haynes – 426	Carey, Farrell – 17	Rachael Haynes	
2018–19	9–4	2nd	SF	Joanne Broadbent	Alex Blackwell	Rachael Haynes – 376	Stafanie Taylor – 19	Rachel Priest	
2019	5–8	6th	DNQ	Trevor Griffin	Rachael Haynes (Note: Alex Blackwell stood in as acting captain for one game.)	Alex Blackwell – 317	Hannah Darlington – 16	Hannah Darlington	
2020	7–5	3rd	C	Trevor Griffin	Rachael Haynes	Heather Knight – 446	Sammy-Jo Johnson – 22*	Heather Knight	
2021	4–8	7th	DNQ	Trevor Griffin	Rachael Haynes (Note: Hannah Darlington was appointed as the stand-in captain in Haynes' absence.)	Smriti Mandhana – 377	Hannah Darlington – 16	Smriti Mandhana	
2022	1–10	8th	DNQ	Trevor Griffin	Rachael Haynes	Phoebe Litchfield – 280	Samantha Bates – 12	Phoebe Litchfield	
2023	7–6	4th	EF	Lisa Keightley	Heather Knight	Chamari Athapaththu – 552	Hannah Darlington – 22	Chamari Athapaththu*	
2024	6–3	3rd	CF	Lisa Keightley	Phoebe Litchfield	Phoebe Litchfield – 342	Samantha Bates – 20	Heather Knight	
2025	4–5	7th	DNQ	Lisa Keightley	Phoebe Litchfield	Phoebe Litchfield – 271	Shabnim Ismail – 12	Heather Knight	

Legend
DNQ	Did not qualify	SF	Semi-finalists	*	Led the league
EF	Lost the Eliminator	RU	Runners-up	^	League record
KF	Lost the Knockout	CF	Lost the Challenger	C	Champions

== Home grounds ==
Venue	Games hosted by season											
Venue	01	02	03	04	05	06	07	08	09	10	11	Total
Bankstown Oval	–	–	–	1	1	–	N/A (Note: No WBBL|07 matches were scheduled to be played in New South Wales and the ACT due to border restrictions related to the COVID-19 pandemic.)	–	–	–	–	2
Blacktown ISP Oval	–	4	–	1	1	2	N/A	3	–	–	–	11
Cricket Central	–	–	–	–	–	–	N/A	–	4	–	–	4
Drummoyne Oval	–	–	–	1	2	2	N/A	–	–	4	4	13
Howell Oval	1	2	1	–	–	–	N/A	–	–	–	–	4
Hurstville Oval	–	–	–	–	–	2	N/A	–	–	–	–	2
Lavington Sports Ground	–	1	1	–	–	–	N/A	–	–	–	–	2
Manuka Oval	–	–	1	1	1	–	N/A	1	–	–	–	4
North Dalton Park	–	–	–	–	1	–	N/A	–	–	–	–	1
North Sydney Oval	–	1	2	1	1	3	N/A	2	3	1	–	14
Robertson Oval	–	–	2	–	–	–	N/A	–	–	–	–	2
Sydney Showground Stadium	1	1	–	3	–	6	N/A	–	–	–	–	11
University Oval No. 1	1	–	–	–	–	–	N/A	–	–	–	–	1

== Current squad ==
The squad of the Sydney Thunder for the 2026 Women's Big Bash League season as of 25 October 2026.

- Players with international caps are listed in **bold**.

No.	Name	Nat.	Birth date	Batting style	Bowling style	Additional Info.
Batters
24	Laura Harris	Australia	18 August 1990 (age 36)	Right-handed	Right-arm medium	
5	**Heather Knight**	England	26 December 1990 (age 35)	Right-handed	Right-arm off spin	International Signing
4	Anika Learoyd	Australia	14 April 2002 (age 24)	Right-handed	Right-arm leg spin	
18	**Phoebe Litchfield**	Australia	18 April 2003 (age 23)	Left-handed	Right-arm leg spin	Captain
13	**Georgia Voll**	Australia	5 August 2003 (age 23)	Right-handed	Right-arm off spin	
All-rounders
25	**Hannah Darlington**	Australia	25 January 2002 (age 24)	Right-handed	Right-arm medium	
32	**Nadine de Klerk**	South Africa	16 January 2000 (age 26)	Right-handed	Right-arm medium	International Signing
81	Lucy Finn	Australia	1 February 2007 (age 19)	Right-handed	Right-arm medium	
9	Hasrat Gill	Australia	9 November 2005 (age 20)	Left-handed	Right-arm leg spin	
Wicket-keepers
21	**Tahlia Wilson**	Australia	21 October 1999 (age 27)	Right-handed	—N/a	
Bowlers
4	Jemma Barsby	Australia	4 October 1995 (age 31)	Left-handed	Right-arm off spin, Left-arm orthodox	
63	**Lauren Bell**	England	2 January 2001 (age 25)	Right-handed	Right-arm fast-medium	International Signing
34	Samantha Bates	Australia	17 August 1992 (age 34)	Right-handed	Left-arm orthodox	
44	Nicola Hancock	Australia	8 November 1995 (age 30)	Right-handed	Right-arm medium	

== Players ==
=== Australian representatives ===
(Australia) The following is a list of cricketers who have played for the Thunder after making their debut in the national women's team (the period they spent as both a Thunder squad member and an Australian-capped player is in brackets):

- Alex Blackwell (WBBL|01–05)
- Lauren Cheatle (WBBL|01–02)
- Rene Farrell (WBBL|01–05)
- Rachael Haynes (WBBL|01–08)
- Erin Osborne (WBBL|01–02)
- Naomi Stalenberg (WBBL|02–05)
- Belinda Vakarewa (WBBL|03–04, 08)
- Nicola Carey (WBBL|04)
- Hannah Darlington (WBBL|07–12)
- Phoebe Litchfield (WBBL|08–12)
- Georgia Voll (WBBL|11–12)
- Tahlia Wilson (WBBL|12)

=== Overseas marquees ===
- (Cricket West Indies) Stafanie Taylor (WBBL|01–04)
- (India) Harmanpreet Kaur (WBBL|02–04)
- (New Zealand) Rachel Priest (WBBL|03–05)
- (England) Fran Wilson (WBBL|03)
- (Pakistan) Nida Dar (WBBL|05)
- (South Africa) Shabnim Ismail (WBBL|05–06, 10–11)
- (England) Tammy Beaumont (WBBL|06, 08)
- (England) Heather Knight (WBBL|06, 09–12)
- (India) Smriti Mandhana (WBBL|07)
- (India) Deepti Sharma (WBBL|07)
- (England) Issy Wong (WBBL|07)
- (New Zealand) Lea Tahuhu (WBBL|08)
- (South Africa) Chloe Tryon (WBBL|08)
- (England) Amy Jones (WBBL|08)
- (Sri Lanka) Chamari Athapaththu (WBBL|09–11)
- (England) Lauren Bell (WBBL|09, 12)
- (South Africa) Marizanne Kapp (WBBL|09)
- (England) Georgia Adams (WBBL|10)
- (England) Emily Arlott (WBBL|11)
- (South Africa) Nadine de Klerk (WBBL|12)

=== Associate rookies ===
- (Thailand) Suleeporn Laomi (WBBL|01)
- (Papua New Guinea) Konio Oala (WBBL|02)
- (Netherlands) Sterre Kalis (WBBL|03)

== Honours ==
- Champions: 2 – WBBL|01, WBBL|06
- Runners-Up: 0
- Minor Premiers: 1 – WBBL|01
- Finals Appearances: 6 – WBBL|01, WBBL|03, WBBL|04, WBBL|06, WBBL|09, WBBL|10
- Wooden Spoons: 1 – WBBL|08

== Statistics and awards ==
=== Team stats ===
- Win–loss record:

Opposition	M	Won	Lost	Tied	NR	W–L%
Adelaide Strikers	20	7	10	0	3	41.18
Brisbane Heat	25	12	13	0	0	48
Hobart Hurricanes	22	12	8	0	2	60
Melbourne Renegades	21	11	10	0	0	52.38
Melbourne Stars	21	13	4	0	4	76.47
Perth Scorchers	23	10	12	0	1	45.45
Sydney Sixers	23	8	12	0	3	40
Total	155	73	69	0	13	51.41

- Highest score in an innings: 5/212 (20 overs) vs Adelaide Strikers, 1 November 2024
- Highest successful chase: 3/173 (19 overs) vs Perth Scorchers, 15 November 2024
- Lowest successful defence: 9/104 (20 overs) vs Melbourne Stars, 17 January 2016
- Largest victory:
  - Batting first: 64 runs vs Adelaide Strikers, 1 November 2024
  - Batting second: 50 balls remaining vs Melbourne Renegades, 27 December 2016
- Longest winning streak: 5 matches
- Longest losing streak: 6 matches

=== Individual stats ===
- Most runs: Rachael Haynes – 2,142
- Highest score in an innings: Smriti Mandhana – 114* (64) vs Melbourne Renegades, 17 November 2021
- Highest partnership: Smriti Mandhana and Tahlia Wilson – 125* vs Melbourne Renegades, 17 November 2021
- Most wickets: Samantha Bates – 128
- Best bowling figures in an innings: Hannah Darlington – 5/10 (4 overs) vs Melbourne Stars, 10 November 2023
- Most catches (fielder): Phoebe Litchfield – 44
- Most dismissals (wicket-keeper): Tahlia Wilson – 41 (24 catches, 17 stumpings)

=== Individual awards ===
- Player of the Match:
  - Stafanie Taylor – 8
  - Alex Blackwell – 7
  - Samantha Bates – 6
  - Chamari Athapaththu, Hannah Darlington, Rene Farrell, Rachael Haynes, and Heather Knight – 4
  - Shabnim Ismail, Sammy-Jo Johnson, Phoebe Litchfield, Naomi Stalenberg, Georgia Voll, and Tahlia Wilson – 3
  - Nicola Carey, Harmanpreet Kaur, and Rachel Priest – 2
  - Lauren Cheatle, Lisa Griffith, Smriti Mandhana, Erin Osborne, Deepti Sharma, Lauren Smith, Belinda Vakarewa, and Issy Wong – 1
- WBBL Player of the Final:
  - Erin Osborne – WBBL|01
  - Shabnim Ismail – WBBL|06
- WBBL Player of the Tournament:
  - Chamari Athapaththu – WBBL|09
- WBBL Team of the Tournament:
  - Samantha Bates (2) – WBBL|06, WBBL|10
  - Hannah Darlington (2) – WBBL|06, WBBL|07
  - Rene Farrell (2) – WBBL|01, WBBL|03
  - Phoebe Litchfield (2) – WBBL|10, WBBL|11
  - Alex Blackwell – WBBL|01
  - Stafanie Taylor – WBBL|04
  - Heather Knight – WBBL|06
  - Chamari Athapaththu – WBBL|09
  - Georgia Voll – WBBL|10
  - Shabnim Ismail – WBBL|11
- WBBL Young Gun Award:
  - Lauren Cheatle – WBBL|01
  - Hannah Darlington – WBBL|05
  - Phoebe Litchfield – WBBL|07

== Sponsors ==
Year	Kit manufacturer	Chest sponsor	Back sponsor	Breast sponsor	Sleeve sponsor
2015–16	Majestic Athletic	Rebel	XVenture	XVenture	Rebel
2016–17	Majestic Athletic	Rebel	Homeworld	Mazda	Rebel
2017–18	Majestic Athletic	Rebel	Homeworld	Mazda	Rebel
2018–19	Majestic Athletic	Mazda	Amart Furniture	Homeworld	Rebel
2019–20	Majestic Athletic	Mazda	Ring.com	Homeworld	Rebel
2020–21	Majestic Athletic	Mazda	Chamberlain	Homeworld	Chamberlain
2021–22	Nike	Chamberlain	Homeworld	Homeworld	What's Your Plan B?
2022–23	Nike	Homeworld	Homestar Finance	Sixt	What's Your Plan B?
2023–24	Nike	Homeworld	Homestar Finance	Sixt	What's Your Plan B?
2024–25	Nike	Homeworld	Homestar Finance		What's Your Plan B?
2025–26	New Balance	Homestar Finance	GWM	Carnival Cruise Line	What's Your Plan B?

== See also ==
- Cricket in New South Wales
- Cricket NSW
- New South Wales Breakers
- Sydney Sixers (WBBL)
