= Tahlia Wilson =

Australian cricketer

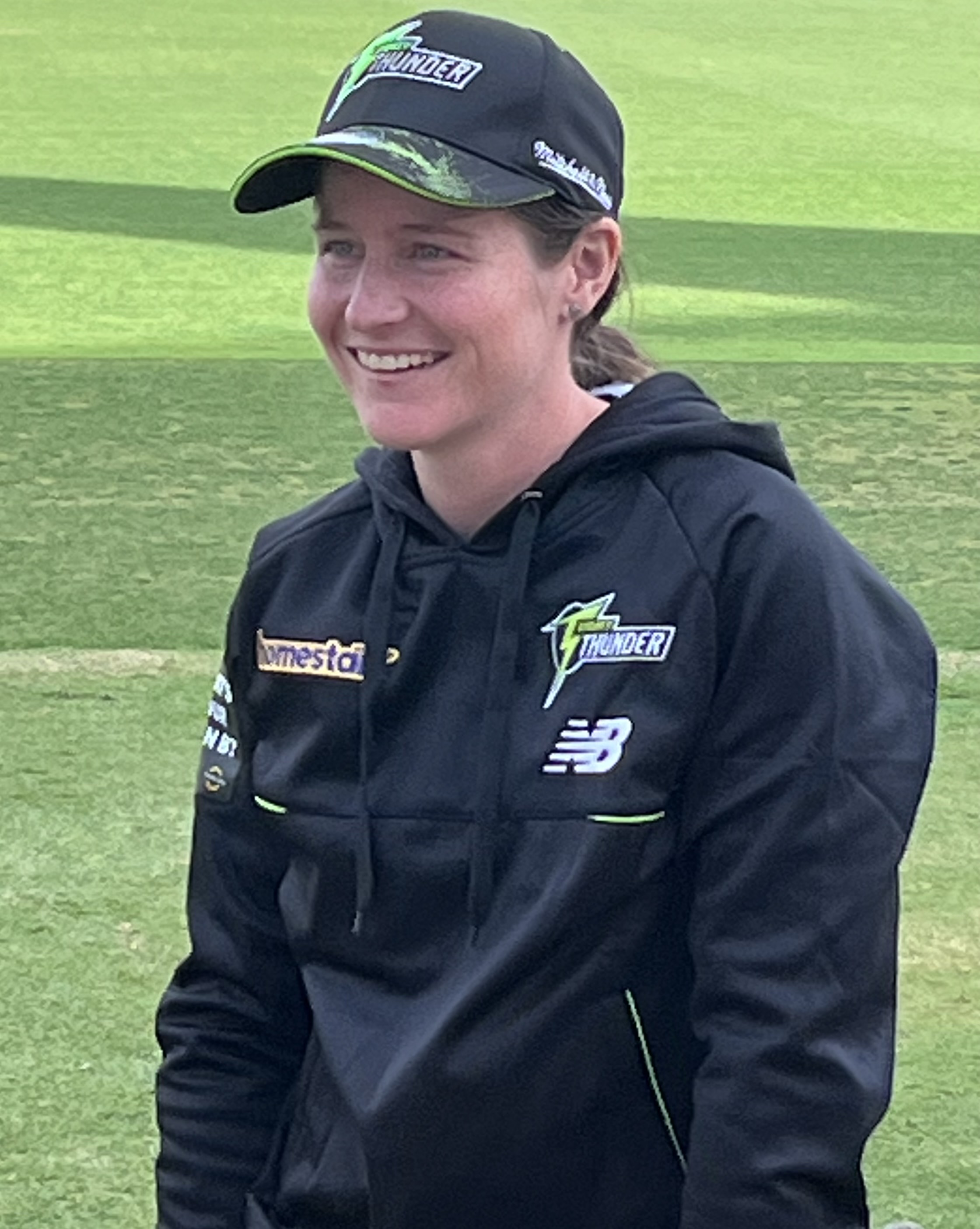
- Wilson in 2025

Personal information
- Full name: Tahlia Beverly Wilson
- Born: 21 October 1999 (age 27); Figtree, New South Wales, Australia
- Batting: Right-handed
- Bowling: Right-arm medium
- Role: Wicket-keeper

International information
- National side: Australia (2026-present)
- Only ODI (cap 152): 27 March 2026 v West Indies

Domestic team information
- Years: Team
- 2018/19: Auckland
- 2017/18–present: New South Wales
- 2018/19: Sydney Sixers
- 2019/20–present: Sydney Thunder

Career statistics
Competition	WLA	WT20
Matches	57	58
Runs scored	1,714	1,212
Batting average	25.00	16.71
100s/50s	3/12	0/7
Top score	112	83*
Catches/stumpings	5/0	6/5
- Source: CricketArchive, 28 March 2026

Tahlia Beverly Wilson (born 21 October 1999) is an Australian cricketer who plays for the New South Wales in the Women's National Cricket League and the Sydney Thunder in the Women's Big Bash League. She played her debut season in 2018-19 for the Sydney Sixers, whilst in Year 12 completing her HSC at St Joseph's Catholic High School as a 19-year-old. She is a wicketkeeper-batter, who has also played for Australia's under 19 teams, and was awarded the McDonald's Women's Premier Cricket Player of the Year for her 471 runs at an average of 235.5.
