= Lauren Smith (cricketer) =

Australian cricketer (born 1996)

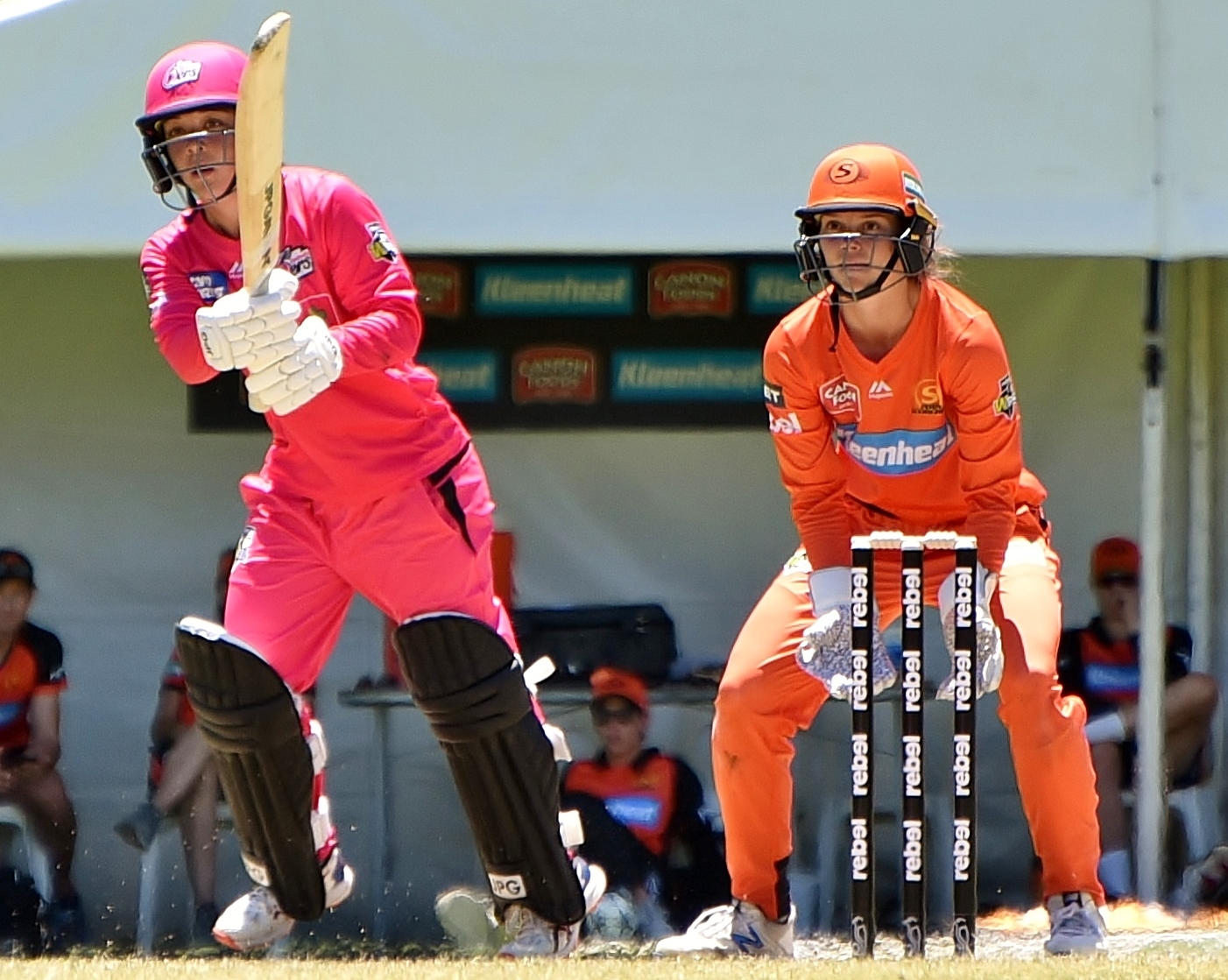
- Smith batting for Sydney Sixers in 2019

Personal information
- Full name: Lauren Georgia Smith
- Born: 6 October 1996 (age 30); Randwick, New South Wales, Australia
- Batting: Right-handed
- Bowling: Right-arm off break
- Role: Bowler

Domestic team information
- Years: Team
- 2014/15–2022/23: New South Wales
- 2015/16–2019/20: Sydney Sixers
- 2016: Lancashire
- 2020/21–2023: Sydney Thunder
- 2022: Suffolk
- 2022: South East Stars
- 2023/24–present: Tasmania
- 2024-present: Hobart Hurricanes

Career statistics
Competition	WLA	WT20
Matches	70	137
Runs scored	451	380
Batting average	16.95	17.75
100s/50s	0/1	0/1
Top score	73*	52
Balls bowled	2,631	1,744
Wickets	70	83
Bowling average	29.53	24.28
5 wickets in innings	0	1
10 wickets in match	0	0
Best bowling	4/25	5/17
Catches/stumpings	19/–	32/–
- Source: Cricket Archive, 5 October 2022

Lauren Georgia Smith (born 6 October 1996) is an Australian cricketer who plays as a right-arm off break bowler and right-handed batter. Smith was selected to play her first Women's National Cricket League (WNCL) match for the New South Wales Breakers at the age of 18. In her debut WNCL match she took four wickets for 36 runs in her ten overs.

Smith previously played for the Sydney Sixers in the Women's Big Bash League before being recruited to play for the Sydney Thunder ahead of the 2020–21 season. She also had a stint with Lancashire in 2016 and with Suffolk in 2022. Later in 2022, she joined the South East Stars squad, scoring 73* and taking 2/20 on debut against North West Thunder.
