= Phoebe Litchfield =

Australian cricketer (born 2003)

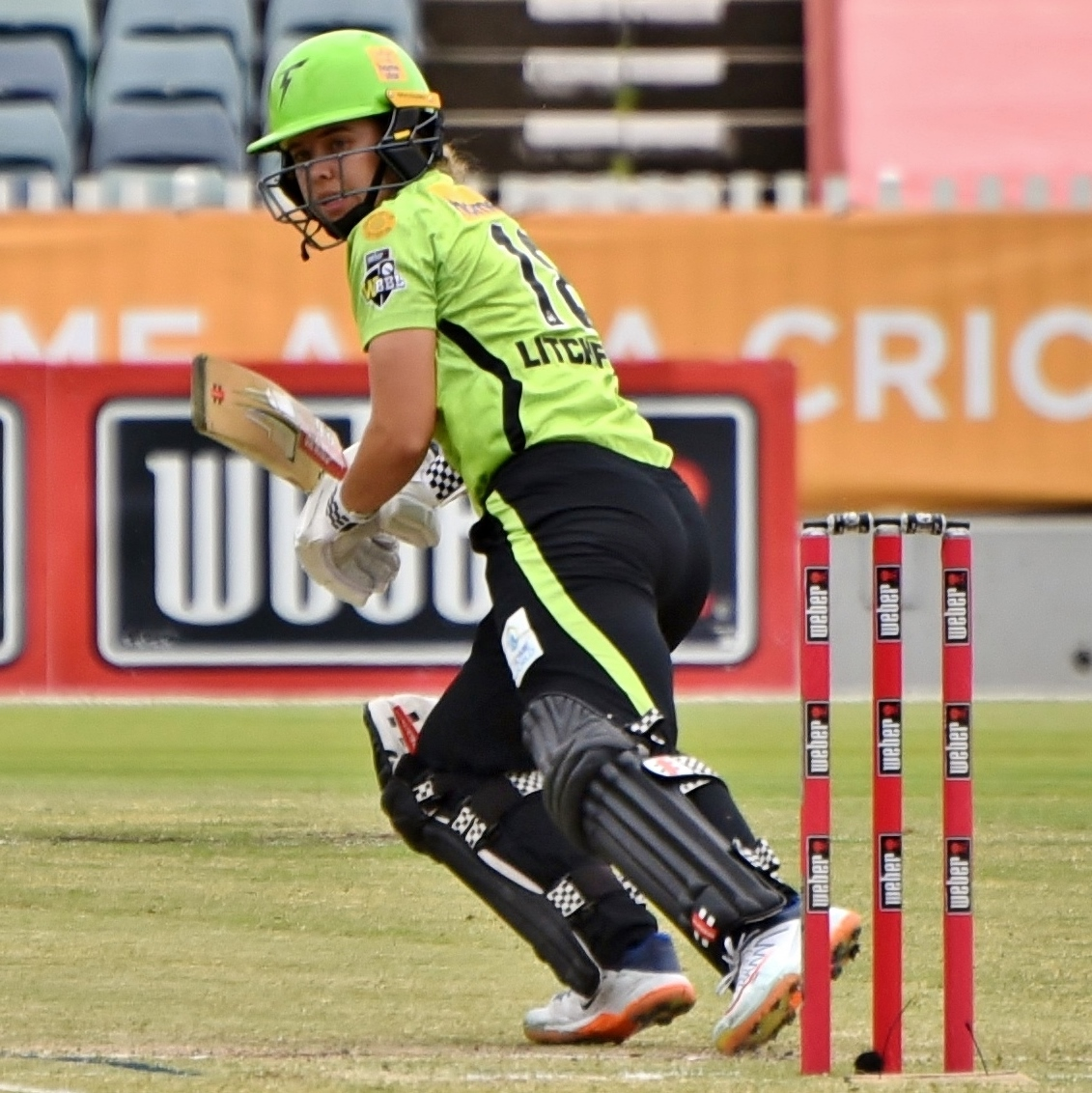
- Litchfield batting for Sydney Thunder in October 2022

Personal information
- Full name: Phoebe Elizabeth Susan Litchfield
- Born: 18 April 2003 (age 23); Orange, New South Wales, Australia
- Batting: Left-handed
- Role: Batter

International information
- National side: Australia (2022–present)
- Test debut (cap 183): 22 June 2023 v England
- Last Test: 6 March 2026 v India
- ODI debut (cap 148): 16 January 2023 v Pakistan
- Last ODI: 9 October 2026 v Bangladesh
- ODI shirt no.: 18
- T20I debut (cap 60): 11 December 2022 v India
- Last T20I: 5 July 2026 v England
- T20I shirt no.: 18

Domestic team information
- Years: Team
- 2019/20–present: New South Wales
- 2019/20–present: Sydney Thunder
- 2023–present: Sunrisers Leeds
- 2023–2025: Gujarat Giants
- 2026: UP Warriorz

Career statistics
Competition	WTest	WODI	WT20I
Matches	5	44	37
Runs scored	156	1,751	680
Batting average	22.28	46.07	28.33
100s/50s	0/0	3/13	0/3
Top score	46	119	64*
Catches/stumpings	4/–	28/–	7/–
Medal record
Women's Cricket
Representing Australia
T20 World Cup
Winner	2026 England & Wales
- Source: ESPNcricinfo, 12 November 2026

Phoebe Elizabeth Susan Litchfield (born 18 April 2003) is an Australian international cricketer who plays as a left-handed batter representing Australia in all three formats of the game. She plays for the New South Wales Breakers in the Women's National Cricket League (WNCL) and captains the Sydney Thunder in the Women's Big Bash League (WBBL). She also plays for the UP Warriorz (WPL) and Sunrisers Leeds (W100).

== Early and personal life ==
Phoebe Elizabeth Susan Litchfield was born and raised in Orange in the Central Tablelands region of New South Wales and attended Kinross Wolaroi School.

In February 2020, Litchfield batted at No.4 in the Bushfire relief match for the Ponting XI.

== Domestic career ==
In October 2019, she made her WBBL debut on 18 October 2019, aged 16, and scored 26 runs off 22 balls. In her second match for the Thunder, she became the youngest player to make a half century in the WBBL.

In November 2020, at 17 years of age, Litchfield played in the Sydney Thunder's WBBL 2020–21 title win. Although she did not get to bat, she took a catch dismissing Alana King for 0 of the bowling of Heather Knight.

In October 2024, Litchfield became the youngest player at 21 years, 193 days old, to captain a WBBL team as permanent captain.

== International career ==
In January 2022, Litchfield was named in Australia's A squad for their series against England A, with the matches being played alongside the Women's Ashes.

In November 2022, she was named in the T20I squad for their series against India. She made her WT20I debut in the 2nd WT20I of the series on 11 December 2022, but did not get to bat. In her second T20I, she scored 11 in the 5th T20I match. In December 2022, Litchfield was named in the Australian ODI squad for a series against Pakistan.

In January 2023, she made her ODI debut in the first match of the series on the 16 January 2023, opening the batting, she became the youngest Australian to score an ODI fifty, making 78 (not out) to chase down the total. In the second match of the series, Litchfield became the first Australian women's cricketer to start their ODI career with back to back 50s, hitting 67 (not out).

In March 2023, she was named in Australia's Test squad for the Ashes series against England. She was also named for the ODIs and T20Is. In April 2023, she received her first Cricket Australia national women's contract. In June 2023, she made her Test debut, opening the batting on 22 June 2023. Litchfield scored 23 in the first innings before being given out lbw. The ball was missing the stumps but Litchfield chose not to review. Litchfield scored 46 runs in the 2nd innings before being bowled. Litchfield did not feature in the T20Is. She opened the batting in the ODIs with scores of 34, 4 and 1.

In July 2023, in the third ODI against Ireland, Litchfield scored her maiden white-ball century, scoring 106 not out, and received the player of the match award. She became the second-youngest Australian woman to hit an ODI century.

In September 2023, Litchfield was named in the ODI and T20I squads to play the West Indies.

In October 2023, Litchfield returned to the T20I team in the first T20I but did not get to bat. In the 2nd T20I, Litchfield scored her first T20I half-century, she equalled Sophie Devine's record for the fastest fifty in a women's T20I off 18 balls, against the West Indies, batting at No.6.

In January 2024, Litchfield scored her second ODI hundred, scoring 119, against India at the Wankhede Stadium.

In August 2024, she was named in the Australia squad for the 2024 ICC Women's T20 World Cup.

In December 2024, Litchfield was included in the Australia squad for the 2025 Women's Ashes series.

=== International centuries ===
One Day International centuries
Runs	Match	Opponents	City	Venue	Year
106*	8	Ireland	Dublin, Ireland	Castle Avenue cricket ground	2023
119	14	India	Mumbai, India	Wankhede Stadium	2024
119	36	India	Navi Mumbai, India	DY Patil Stadium	2025
