= Sammy-Jo Johnson =

Australian cricketer

Personal information
- Full name: Sammy-Jo Johnson
- Born: 5 November 1992 (age 34); Lismore, New South Wales, Australia
- Batting: Right-handed
- Bowling: Right-arm medium-fast
- Role: All-rounder

Domestic team information
- Years: Team
- 2010: Cumbria
- 2011/12–2019/20: Queensland (squad no. 58)
- 2015/16–2019/20: Brisbane Heat (squad no. 58)
- 2020/21–present: Sydney Thunder
- 2020/21–present: New South Wales
- 2021: Trent Rockets

Career statistics
Competition	WLA	WT20
Matches	94	161
Runs scored	1,217	1,312
Batting average	18.72	14.10
100s/50s	0/3	0/3
Top score	67	52*
Balls bowled	3,802	2,667
Wickets	113	141
Bowling average	25.90	22.15
5 wickets in innings	1	0
10 wickets in match	0	0
Best bowling	5/20	4/15
Catches/stumpings	15/–	28/–
- Source: CricketArchive, 14 February 2025

Sammy-Jo Johnson (born 5 November 1992) is an Australian cricketer who plays as a right-arm medium-fast bowler and right-handed batter for New South Wales Breakers in the Women's National Cricket League and Sydney Thunder in the Women's Big Bash League. In the former competition, she played for Queensland Fire from 2011 to 2020 before joining the Breakers for 2020–21. In the latter competition, she played for Brisbane Heat from the first season of the competition in 2015–16, until she signed for the Thunder for 2020–21.

== Early life and career ==
From Lismore in New South Wales, Johnson attended Blue Hills College, Goonellabah. She started playing cricket at the age of 12, after having watched it since she "was a little kid". As a young cricketer, she was inspired by Brett Lee, and sometimes, after taking a wicket, she would emulate him by jumping in the air or doing "the chainsaw".

By the 2007–08 season, Johnson was regularly playing as the opening bowler for Clunes boys Under-16s team on Saturday mornings, and then for the Easts third grade men's team on Saturday afternoons. In February 2008, she was selected in the all-girls NSW Combined Independent Schools team, which, under the captaincy of Ellyse Perry, competed in the NSW Schoolgirls Championship the following month. Subsequently, Johnson was named in the NSW Under-16 girls All Schools team and the NSW Under-17 and Under-19 girls squads, and attended training with the Australian Under-18 girls talent squad.

== Adam Gilchrist scholarship ==
In 2010, Johnson became the second female player to receive the Adam Gilchrist scholarship, through which she travelled to the UK to play for five months for the Cumbria Women cricket team in the north of England. She was selected to play in the County Firsts and Northern Leagues Firsts teams, helped coach Under-10 and Under-13 county teams, and also attended school-based programs and holiday camps.

Soon after arriving in England, playing for Cumbria in a match against a leading junior boys representative side, Johnson took 3-22 from eight overs, and then recorded her first ever century, by scoring 110 in her team’s total of 173. Over the five months of her scholarship, she had much success, taking took more than 60 wickets, and compiling just under 1,000 runs. At about that time, however, she was told that there was no place for her in the star-studded NSW Breakers senior team.

== Senior domestic career ==
In the spring of 2011, Johnson was encouraged by Queensland Fire coach Andy Richards to become involved in Brisbane Grade cricket, with a view to winning Fire selection. Just three weeks after joining the Western Suburbs grade team, and at the age of 19 years, Johnson was selected to debut for the Fire in a Twenty20 match against the ACT Meteors. The match ended in a tie, with Johnson taking 1-18 off three overs; when the scores were still level after a super over, Queensland eventually won on a countback. In Johnson's next T20 match, also against the Meteors, she bagged 3-9 off four overs.

Later that season, in a match against the NSW Breakers that proved to be Johnson's season's highlight, she dismissed internationals Alyssa Healy, Alex Blackwell and Lisa Sthalekar in the space of two overs, and recorded the figures of 3-14 over four overs, as the Breakers made a record-low 9-82.

Johnson finished the 2011–12 T20 season with 10 wickets from eight matches at 12.50 and an economy rate of 5.43. In the Fire's one day campaign, she bowled 18 overs in four matches and took a combined 2-76, with a best performance of 2-28 off eight overs against the South Australian Scorpions.

Johnson has been a member of the Brisbane Heat squad since its inaugural WBBL01 season (2015–16). In November 2018, she was named in Brisbane Heat's squad for the 2018–19 Women's Big Bash League season. In 2021, she was drafted by Trent Rockets for the inaugural season of The Hundred. She was the leading wicket taker for Trent Rockets with 15 wickets.
