= Hannah Darlington =

Australian cricketer (born 2002)

Personal information
- Full name: Hannah Joy Darlington
- Born: 25 January 2002 (age 24); Sydney, New South Wales
- Batting: Right-handed
- Bowling: Right-arm medium
- Role: All-rounder

International information
- National side: Australia (2021–present)
- ODI debut (cap 145): 21 September 2021 v India
- Last ODI: 24 September 2021 v India
- T20I debut (cap 55): 7 October 2021 v India
- Last T20I: 9 October 2021 v India

Domestic team information
- Years: Team
- 2017–present: Sydney Thunder
- 2019–20: Otago
- 2019–present: New South Wales

Career statistics
Competition	WLA	WT20
Matches	31	90
Runs scored	265	406
Batting average	16.56	10.97
100s/50s	0/0	0/0
Top score	42	40*
Balls bowled	1,144	1,820
Wickets	27	109
Bowling average	38.70	19.87
5 wickets in innings	0	1
10 wickets in match	0	0
Best bowling	3/30	5/10
Catches/stumpings	8/–	29/–
- Source: , 16 January 2025

Hannah Joy Darlington (born 25 January 2002) is an Australian cricketer who made her debut for the national women's team in September 2021. A right-arm medium-pace bowler, Darlington previously was the captain of the Sydney Thunder in the Women's Big Bash League (WBBL) and vice-captain of the New South Wales Breakers in the Women's National Cricket League (WNCL). In 2021, she won the Betty Wilson Young Cricketer of the Year award.

== Early life and education ==
Hailing from Erskine Park in Western Sydney, Darlington has Indigenous heritage and identifies as a member of the Kamilaroi people. While in primary school, she accidentally hit a teacher in the head with a ball and was given a choice of attending detention or joining the cricket team, prompting her formal introduction to the sport. She completed her HSC at Westfields Sports High School.

== Domestic career ==
=== Women's Big Bash League ===
At 15 years of age, Darlington signed with the Sydney Thunder ahead of the 2017–18 Women's Big Bash League season. In 2018, she was selected as the captain for the Thunder's first female Indigenous XI.

Darlington earned her WBBL debut in the opening match of the 2019–20 season on the same day of her Year 12 English exam. She made her first major impression on the league in her third appearance by taking a difficult match-winning catch on the last ball of a three-run victory against the Melbourne Renegades at Blacktown ISP Oval. Primarily contributing to the team through her medium-pace bowling, Darlington claimed 16 wickets during the tournament at an economy rate of 6.82, leading to her winning the WBBL|05 Young Gun Award and being named the Thunder's Player of the Season.

After overcoming a lower-leg injury early in the 2020–21 season, Darlington affirmed her status as "one of the best death bowlers" in the league—on 8 November at Hurstville Oval, for example, she restricted the Hobart Hurricanes to nine runs off the final over of the match to help secure a one-run victory. The "level-headed" teenager then delivered her first Player of the Match performance in a "chaotic" semi-final against the Brisbane Heat, claiming figures of 3/19 and sparking a memorable comeback victory. The Thunder would go on to defeat the Melbourne Stars in the final, and Darlington was named in the WBBL|06 Team of the Tournament.

=== Women's Super Smash ===
Having missed out on a WNCL contract for the 2019–20 season, Darlington opted to spend much of the summer overseas playing for the Otago Sparks in New Zealand's domestic T20 competition, the Women's Super Smash. She took 13 wickets at an economy rate of 5.75 throughout the tournament while her team finished in third place, losing to the Auckland Hearts in an elimination final.

=== Women's National Cricket League ===
Darlington made her debut for the New South Wales Breakers during the 2019–20 Women's National Cricket League season, taking 2/29 from ten overs in a one-wicket victory against Tasmania. On 26 February 2021, at 19 years and 31 days, she became the youngest-ever captain in New South Wales' 165-year history of senior cricket teams, standing in for regular Breakers captain Alyssa Healy in a WNCL match against Tasmania which ended in a tie.

== International career ==
Darlington was selected for an Indigenous team which toured the United Kingdom in 2018 as a celebration of the 150th anniversary of the 1868 Aboriginal tour of England. In March 2019, she toured New Zealand as a member of the Australian Under-19 squad, though the trip ended prematurely due to the Christchurch terror attack.

Darlington was named in Australia's limited overs squad for their tour of New Zealand in March 2021, but was not selected in the playing XI during the six-match schedule. She was then named in Australia's squad for a multi-format series against India later in the year. During the series, Darlington made her Women's One Day International (WODI) debut on 21 September 2021, as well as her Women's Twenty20 International (WT20I) debut on 7 October 2021.

In January 2022, Darlington was named in Australia's squad for their series against England to contest the Women's Ashes. Later the same month, she was named as a reserve in Australia's team for the 2022 Women's Cricket World Cup in New Zealand. However, she subsequently withdrew from the squad to take a break from cricket, and was replaced by Heather Graham.
