= 2022–23 Melbourne Renegades WBBL season =

Australian cricket team season

Melbourne Renegades
2022–23 season
- Melbourne Renegades 2022–23 cap logo
- Coach: Simon Helmot
- Captain(s): Sophie Molineux
- Home ground: CitiPower Centre
- League: WBBL
- Record: 4–9 (7th)
- Finals: DNQ
- Leading Run Scorer: Hayley Matthews – 253
- Leading Wicket Taker: Ismail, Molineux – 11 each
- Player of the Season: Sophie Molineux

The 2022–23 Melbourne Renegades Women's season was the eighth in the team's history. Coached by Simon Helmot and captained by Sophie Molineux, the Renegades finished the regular season of WBBL|08 in seventh position and failed to qualify for the finals.

== Squad ==
Each 2022–23 squad was made up of 15 active players. Teams could sign up to five 'marquee players', with a maximum of three of those from overseas. Marquees are classed as any overseas player, or a local player who holds a Cricket Australia national contract at the start of the WBBL|08 signing period.

Personnel changes made ahead of the season included:

- Australian marquee Tayla Vlaeminck returned to the Renegades, departing the Hobart Hurricanes. Due to injury, Vlaeminck and fellow Australian marquee Georgia Wareham were unavailable for the tournament.
- Holly Ferling departed the Renegades, signing with the Perth Scorchers.
- Jess Duffin did not re-sign with the Renegades.
- Sarah Coyte signed with the Renegades, having previously played for the Adelaide Strikers and Sydney Sixers.
- Georgia Prestwidge signed with the Renegades, having previously played for the Brisbane Heat.
- Indian marquee Jemimah Rodrigues departed the Renegades, signing with the Melbourne Stars.
- Barbadian marquee Hayley Matthews signed with the Renegades, having previously played for the Hobart Hurricanes.
- South African marquee Shabnim Ismail returned to the Renegades for the first time since WBBL|01, having also previously played for the Sydney Thunder.
- English marquee Eve Jones did not initially return to the Renegades, but later signed as a replacement player.

Changes made during the season included:

- Sri Lankan marquee Chamari Athapaththu returned to the Renegades, having played for the side between WBBL|03 and WBBL|05, replacing the injured Harmanpreet Kaur.
- Paris Bowdler signed as a local replacement player, after Josie Dooley sustained a hip injury.
- Hayley Matthews stood in as acting captain for two games, after Sophie Molineux sustained a knee injury.

The table below lists the Renegades players and their key stats (including runs scored, batting strike rate, wickets taken, economy rate, catches and stumpings) for the season.

No.	Name	Nat.	Date of birth	Batting style	Bowling style	G	R	SR	W	E	C	S	Notes
Batters
50	Hayley Matthews	(Barbados)	19 March 1998	Right-handed	Right-arm off spin	14	253	109.52	9	7.04	3	–	Overseas marquee
11	Courtney Webb	(Australia)	30 November 1999	Right-handed	Right-arm medium	14	252	97.29	–	–	1	–	
All-rounders
58	Chamari Athapaththu	(Sri Lanka)	9 February 1990	Left-handed	Right-arm off break	10	133	90.47	–	–	2	–	Overseas marquee (replacement)
8	Evelyn Jones	(England)	8 August 1992	Left-handed	Left-arm medium	4	24	75.00	–	–	1	–	Overseas marquee (replacement)
7	Harmanpreet Kaur	(India)	8 March 1989	Right-handed	Right-arm off spin	–	–	–	–	–	–	–	Overseas marquee (unavailable)
74	Carly Leeson	(Australia)	9 November 1998	Right-handed	Right-arm medium	14	211	106.56	–	–	1	–	
Wicket-keeper
19	Paris Bowdler	(Australia)	24 November 2004	Right-handed	–	1	2	50.00	–	–	0	0	Replacement player; † × 1 inns
3	Josie Dooley	(Australia)	21 January 2000	Right-handed	–	11	185	105.11	–	–	9	0	† × 10 inns
15	Erica Kershaw	(Australia)	23 December 1991	Right-handed	Right-arm leg spin	9	100	119.04	–	–	1	0	† × 2 inns
Bowlers
25	Sarah Coyte	(Australia)	30 March 1991	Right-handed	Right-arm medium	13	48	106.66	10	7.20	4	–	
12	Ella Hayward	(Australia)	8 September 2003	Right-handed	Right-arm off spin	11	8	40.00	6	6.09	4	–	
89	Shabnim Ismail	(South Africa)	5 October 1988	Left-handed	Right-arm fast	13	8	53.33	11	6.95	1	–	Overseas marquee
23	Sophie Molineux	(Australia)	17 January 1998	Left-handed	Left-arm orthodox	12	130	89.65	11	7.17	2	–	Captain
26	Rhiann O'Donnell	(Australia)	14 April 1998	Right-handed	Right-arm medium	10	42	97.67	0	14.00	2		
16	Georgia Prestwidge	(Australia)	17 December 1997	Right-handed	Right-arm medium	13	13	70.73	5	8.20	2	–	
	Tayla Vlaeminck	(Australia)	27 October 1998	Right-handed	Right-arm fast	–	–	–	–	–	–	–	Australian marquee (unavailable)
32	Georgia Wareham	(Australia)	26 May 1999	Right-handed	Right-arm leg spin	–	–	–	–	–	–	–	Australian marquee (unavailable)

== Ladder ==
Pos	Team	Pld	W	L	NR	Pts	NRR
1	Sydney Sixers (RU)	14	11	2	1	23	0.695
2	Adelaide Strikers (C)	14	8	5	1	17	0.390
3	Brisbane Heat (CF)	14	8	5	1	17	0.276
4	Hobart Hurricanes (EF)	14	7	6	1	15	0.457
5	Perth Scorchers	14	6	7	1	13	0.373
6	Melbourne Stars	14	5	6	3	13	−0.339
7	Melbourne Renegades	14	4	9	1	9	−1.042
8	Sydney Thunder	14	1	10	3	5	−1.000

Source: cricket.com.au, ESPN Cricinfo
- The top 4 teams advanced to the play-off phase

== Fixtures ==
All times are AEDT.

Match 5
16 October 2022
10:15
Scorecard

Adelaide Strikers; 7/126 (20 overs)	v	Melbourne Renegades; 6/128 (19.5 overs)
Madeline Penna 36 (43); Sophie Molineux 4/23 (4 overs)		Sophie Molineux 32 (35); Megan Schutt 2/23 (4 overs)

Melbourne Renegades won by 4 wickets (with 1 ball remaining)
Great Barrier Reef Arena, Mackay
Umpires: David Taylor and Nathan James
Player of the match: Sophie Molineux (Melbourne Renegades)

- Melbourne Renegades won the toss and elected to field.
- Broadcast by Seven Network and Foxtel

Match 9
18 October 2022
15:30
Scorecard

Brisbane Heat; 1/180 (20 overs)	v	Melbourne Renegades; 6/159 (20 overs)
Georgia Redmayne 98* (67); Shabnim Ismail 1/31 (4 overs)		Hayley Matthews 35 (19); Amelia Kerr 2/27 (4 overs)

Brisbane Heat won by 21 runs
Great Barrier Reef Arena, Mackay
Umpires: Michael Mellifont and Nathan James
Player of the match: Georgia Redmayne (Brisbane Heat)

- Melbourne Renegades won the toss and elected to field.
- Broadcast by cricket.com.au and Foxtel

Match 12
21 October 2022
12:00
Scorecard

Brisbane Heat; 8/163 (20 overs)	v	Melbourne Renegades; 137 (19 overs)
Georgia Voll 52 (37); Shabnim Ismail 1/23 (4 overs)		Courtney Webb 47* (40); Charli Knott 3/19 (4 overs)

Brisbane Heat won by 26 runs
Karen Rolton Oval, Adelaide
Umpires: Harsimran Singh and James Cushway
Player of the match: Georgia Voll (Brisbane Heat)

- Melbourne Renegades won the toss and elected to field.
- Broadcast by cricket.com.au and Foxtel

Match 17
24 October 2022
15:30
Scorecard

Melbourne Renegades; 101 (19.5 overs)	v	Adelaide Strikers; 2/102 (17 overs)
Carly Leeson 35 (33); Amanda-Jade Wellington 5/8 (3.5 overs)		Deandra Dottin 55* (55); Sarah Coyte 2/19 (3 overs)

Adelaide Strikers won by 8 wickets (with 18 balls remaining)
Karen Rolton Oval, Adelaide
Umpires: Dhaval Bhatt and Eloise Sheridan
Player of the match: Amanda-Jade Wellington (Adelaide Strikers)

- Adelaide Strikers won the toss and elected to field.
- Broadcast by cricket.com.au and Foxtel
- Amanda-Jade Wellington (Adelaide Strikers) equalled the WBBL record for best bowling figures in an innings.

Match 22
29 October 2022
14:00
Scorecard

Melbourne Renegades; 91 (19 overs)	v	Melbourne Stars; 4/92 (17.3 overs)
Hayley Matthews 24 (24); Sophie Day 4/19 (4 overs)		Annabel Sutherland 42* (48); Shabnim Ismail 1/15 (4 overs)

Melbourne Stars won by 6 wickets (with 15 balls remaining)
Eastern Oval, Ballarat
Umpires: Lisa McCabe and Mattis van Eck
Player of the match: Annabel Sutherland (Melbourne Stars)

- Melbourne Stars won the toss and elected to field.
- Broadcast by cricket.com.au and Foxtel

Match 24
30 October 2022
15:00
Scorecard

Sydney Sixers; 3/188 (20 overs)	v	Melbourne Renegades; 9/151 (20 overs)
Alyssa Healy 78 (54); Sophie Molineux 2/38 (4 overs)		Carly Leeson 52 (32); Maitlan Brown 3/16 (4 overs)

Sydney Sixers won by 37 runs
Eastern Oval, Ballarat
Umpires: Daryl Brigham and Gaurav Bawa
Player of the match: Alyssa Healy (Sydney Sixers)

- Melbourne Renegades won the toss and elected to field.
- Broadcast by cricket.com.au and Foxtel

Match 28
3 November 2022
19:10 (N)
Scorecard

Melbourne Renegades; 5/133 (20 overs)	v	Hobart Hurricanes; 6/137 (18.1 overs)
Chamari Athapaththu 75* (59); Maisy Gibson 4/24 (4 overs)		Heather Graham 39* (26); Sophie Molineux 2/31 (3.1 overs)

Hobart Hurricanes won by 4 wickets (with 11 balls remaining)
Blundstone Arena, Hobart
Umpires: Muhammad Qureshi and Troy Penman
Player of the match: Maisy Gibson (Hobart Hurricanes)

- Hobart Hurricanes won the toss and elected to field.
- Broadcast by Seven Network and Foxtel

Match 33
6 November 2022
13:40
Scorecard

Sydney Thunder; 6/121 (20 overs)	v	Melbourne Renegades; 5/122 (18 overs)
Amy Jones 53 (48); Ella Hayward 2/14 (4 overs)		Sophie Molineux 55* (45); Hannah Darlington 2/22 (3 overs)

Melbourne Renegades won by 5 wickets (with 12 balls remaining)
Blundstone Arena, Hobart
Umpires: Eloise Sheridan and Muhammad Qureshi
Player of the match: Sophie Molineux (Melbourne Renegades)

- Sydney Thunder won the toss and elected to bat.
- Broadcast by Seven Network and Foxtel

Match 35
7 November 2022
19:10 (N)
Scorecard

Melbourne Renegades; 80 (17.2 overs)	v	Hobart Hurricanes; 2/82 (10.4 overs)
Courtney Webb 30 (36); Molly Strano 4/16 (4 overs)		Elyse Villani 41* (34); Sophie Molineux 2/20 (3 overs)

Hobart Hurricanes won by 8 wickets (with 56 balls remaining)
Blundstone Arena, Hobart
Umpires: Greg Beechey and Jeremiah Matibiri
Player of the match: Molly Strano (Hobart Hurricanes)

- Hobart Hurricanes won the toss and elected to field.
- Broadcast by cricket.com.au and Foxtel

Match 37
10 November 2022
15:00
Scorecard

Melbourne Renegades; 1/64 (11 overs)	v	Sydney Sixers
Hayley Matthews 40 (41); Ashleigh Gardner 1/21 (3 overs)

No result
CitiPower Centre, Melbourne
Umpires: Chris Grant and Greg Azzopardi

- Sydney Sixers won the toss and elected to field.
- No further play was possible due to rain.
- Broadcast by cricket.com.au and Foxtel

Match 39
12 November 2022
10:15
Scorecard

Perth Scorchers; 4/192 (20 overs)	v	Melbourne Renegades; 88 (17.3 overs)
Beth Mooney 90 (58); Georgia Prestwidge 1/37 (4 overs)		Erica Kershaw 25 (22); Piepa Cleary 2/6 (2 overs)

Perth Scorchers won by 104 runs
CitiPower Centre, Melbourne
Umpires: Mattis van Eck and Stephen Dionysius
Player of the match: Beth Mooney (Perth Scorchers)

- Melbourne Renegades won the toss and elected to field.
- Broadcast by Seven Network and Foxtel
- Perth Scorchers set a new WBBL record for greatest winning margin (by runs).

Match 43
13 November 2022
13:40
Scorecard

Melbourne Renegades; 8/148 (20 overs)	v	Melbourne Stars; 5/149 (20 overs)
Josie Dooley 54 (46); Sasha Moloney 4/15 (4 overs)		Annabel Sutherland 62* (29); Sarah Coyte 3/22 (4 overs)

Melbourne Stars won by 5 wickets (with 0 balls remaining)
CitiPower Centre, Melbourne
Umpires: Chris Grant and David Taylor
Player of the match: Annabel Sutherland (Melbourne Stars)

- Melbourne Stars won the toss and elected to field.
- Broadcast by Seven Network and Foxtel

In the 15th meeting between the two Melbourne teams—the first to take place in their home city since 30 November 2019—the Renegades lost three early wickets before Josie Dooley and Courtney Webb formed a 50-run partnership from 39 balls. Sarah Coyte hit two sixes off the bowling of Kim Garth in the 20th over, helping to set a target of 149 for victory.

The Stars began the run chase sluggishly, and failed to capitalise on several controversial umpiring decisions in their favour. Alice Capsey survived a close stumping chance but was ultimately dismissed for just eleven, while the Decision Review System overturned an LBW call for Garth who would nevertheless fall to the bowling of Coyte in the following over. Earlier in the innings, Coyte became the eighth player in WBBL history to claim 100 career wickets.

Annabel Sutherland breathed life into the contest as the Stars scored 22 runs from the 14th over against the previously economical Ella Hayward. The Renegades created several opportunities to effectively close out the match but put down key catching chances, which included an error in the field by Shabnim Ismail off her own bowling.

Needing an unlikely 23 runs from six balls to win, Sutherland promptly launched two sixes to dramatically shift the game's momentum. While delivering the third ball of the final over, Renegades captain Sophie Molineux suffered a knee injury which forced her from the field. Georgia Prestwidge was subsequently given the task of finishing the over, having not bowled throughout the innings up to that point. Sutherland proceeded to hit another six, and Stars captain Nicole Faltum then scored one run off the last delivery of the match to clinch her team's sixth win against their crosstown rivals.

Match 47
15 November 2022
19:10 (N)
Scorecard

Sydney Thunder; 95 (20 overs)	v	Melbourne Renegades; 2/98 (14.2 overs)
Tahlia Wilson 20 (27); Georgia Prestwidge 3/22 (4 overs)		Hayley Matthews 46* (40); Lauren Smith 1/12 (3 overs)

Melbourne Renegades won by 8 wickets (with 34 balls remaining)
Manuka Oval, Canberra
Umpires: Andrew Crozier and Dinusha Bandara
Player of the match: Georgia Prestwidge (Melbourne Renegades)

- Melbourne Renegades won the toss and elected to field.
- Broadcast by cricket.com.au and Foxtel

Match 53
20 November 2022
10:15
Scorecard

Perth Scorchers; 2/46 (8 overs)	v	Melbourne Renegades; 4/58 (7.3 overs)
Sophie Devine 24* (22); Shabnim Ismail 1/12 (2 overs)		Erica Kershaw 34* (18); Lilly Mills 3/9 (2 overs)

Melbourne Renegades won by 6 wickets (with 3 balls remaining) (DLS method)
Ted Summerton Reserve, Moe
Umpires: Daryl Brigham and Lisa McCabe
Player of the match: Erica Kershaw (Melbourne Renegades)

- Melbourne Renegades won the toss and elected to field.
- Match reduced to 8 overs per side due to rain. Melbourne Renegades were set a revised target of 57 for victory.
- Broadcast by cricket.com.au and Foxtel

== Statistics and awards ==
- Most runs: Hayley Matthews – 253 (24th in the league)
- Highest score in an innings: Chamari Athapaththu – 75* (59) vs Hobart Hurricanes, 3 November 2022
- Most wickets: Shabnim Ismail, Sophie Molineux – 11 each (equal 24th in the league)
- Best bowling figures in an innings: Sophie Molineux – 4/23 (4 overs) vs Adelaide Strikers, 16 October 2022
- Most catches (fielder): Sarah Coyte, Ella Hayward – 4 each (equal 31st in the league)
- Player of the Match awards:
  - Sophie Molineux – 2
  - Erica Kershaw, Georgia Prestwidge – 1 each
- WBBL|08 Player of the Tournament: Hayley Matthews (equal 9th)
- Renegades Player of the Season: Sophie Molineux
