= 2022–23 Adelaide Strikers WBBL season =

Women's Big Bash team

Adelaide Strikers
2022–23 season
- Adelaide Strikers 2022–23 cap logo
- Coach: Luke Williams
- Captain(s): Tahlia McGrath
- Home ground: Karen Rolton Oval
- League: WBBL
- Record: 8–5 (2nd)
- Finals: Champions
- Leading Run Scorer: Laura Wolvaardt – 403
- Leading Wicket Taker: Megan Schutt – 27
- Player of the Season: Megan Schutt

The 2022–23 Adelaide Strikers Women's season was the eighth in the team's history. Coached by Luke Williams and captained by Tahlia McGrath, the Strikers finished the regular season of WBBL|08 in second position. They subsequently defeated the Brisbane Heat in the Challenger, thereby qualifying for a third Final appearance in four seasons. In the championship decider, the Strikers pulled off an upset victory against the Sydney Sixers to claim their maiden Women's Big Bash League title.

== Squad ==
Each 2022–23 squad was made up of 15 active players. Teams could sign up to five 'marquee players', with a maximum of three of those from overseas. Marquees were defined as any overseas player, or a local player who holds a Cricket Australia national contract at the start of the WBBL|08 signing period.

Personnel changes made ahead of the season included:

- South African marquee Dane van Niekerk did not re-sign with the Strikers.
- Barbadian marquee Deandra Dottin signed with the Strikers, having previously played for the Perth Scorchers and Brisbane Heat.
- Sarah Coyte departed the Strikers, signing with the Melbourne Renegades.
- Anesu Mushangwe signed with the Strikers as a local player due to her permanent residence in Australia, despite having recently played international cricket for Zimbabwe.

Changes made during the season included:

- Megan Schutt stood in as acting captain for two games while Tahlia McGrath was rested with a back complaint.

The table below lists the Strikers players and their key stats (including runs scored, batting strike rate, wickets taken, economy rate, catches and stumpings) for the season.

No.	Name	Nat.	Birth date	Batting style	Bowling style	G	R	SR	W	E	C	S	Notes
Batters
2	Katie Mack	(Australia)	14 September 1993	Right-handed	Right-arm leg spin	16	350	108.69	–	–	5	–	
9	Tahlia McGrath	(Australia)	10 November 1995	Right-handed	Right-arm medium	14	244	117.87	3	8.71	7	–	Captain, Australian marquee
5	Annie O'Neil	(Australia)	18 February 1999	Right-handed	Right-arm leg spin	2	3	60.00	–	–	0	–	
21	Bridget Patterson	(Australia)	4 December 1994	Right-handed	Right-arm medium	16	216	114.28	–	–	12	–	
8	Madeline Penna	(Australia)	30 August 2000	Right-handed	Right-arm leg spin	16	271	105.44	0	6.00	8	–	
14	Laura Wolvaardt	(South Africa)	26 April 1999	Right-handed	–	16	403	106.05	–	–	4	–	Overseas marquee
All-rounders
12	Meagan Dixon	(Australia)	23 April 1997	Right-handed	Right-arm medium	–	–	–	–	–	–	–	
91	Deandra Dottin	(Barbados)	21 June 1991	Right-handed	Right-arm medium fast	16	362	114.19	14	7.53	6	–	Overseas marquee
Wicket-keeper
7	Tegan McPharlin	(Australia)	7 August 1988	Right-handed	–	16	43	138.70	–	–	5	8	
Bowlers
4	Jemma Barsby	(Australia)	4 October 1995	Left-handed	Right-arm off spin	16	4	44.44	18	5.86	8	–	
20	Darcie Brown	(Australia)	7 March 2003	Right-handed	Right-arm fast	16	3	75.00	16	6.54	4	–	Australian marquee
61	Anesu Mushangwe	(Zimbabwe)	25 February 1996	Right-handed	Right-arm medium	1	–	–	1	5.72	2	–	
27	Megan Schutt	(Australia)	15 January 1993	Right-handed	Right-arm medium fast	15	23	153.33	27	6.39	4	–	Australian marquee
10	Amanda-Jade Wellington	(Australia)	29 May 1997	Right-handed	Right-arm leg spin	16	40	86.95	23	6.85	8	–	
	Ella Wilson	(Australia)	17 November 2003	Right-handed	Right-arm medium fast	–	–	–	–	–	–	–	

== Ladder ==
Pos	Team	Pld	W	L	NR	Pts	NRR
1	Sydney Sixers (RU)	14	11	2	1	23	0.695
2	Adelaide Strikers (C)	14	8	5	1	17	0.390
3	Brisbane Heat (CF)	14	8	5	1	17	0.276
4	Hobart Hurricanes (EF)	14	7	6	1	15	0.457
5	Perth Scorchers	14	6	7	1	13	0.373
6	Melbourne Stars	14	5	6	3	13	−0.339
7	Melbourne Renegades	14	4	9	1	9	−1.042
8	Sydney Thunder	14	1	10	3	5	−1.000

Source: cricket.com.au, ESPN Cricinfo
- The top 4 teams advanced to the play-off phase

== Fixtures ==
All times are AEDT.

=== Regular season ===
Match 3
15 October 2022
15:40
Scorecard

Sydney Sixers; 2/151 (20 overs)	v	Adelaide Strikers; 9/134 (20 overs)
Suzie Bates 82* (67); Darcie Brown 1/20 (4 overs)		Katie Mack 34 (32); Sophie Ecclestone 4/17 (4 overs)

Sydney Sixers won by 17 runs
Great Barrier Reef Arena, Mackay
Umpires: Claire Polosak and Nathan James
Player of the match: Suzie Bates (Sydney Sixers)

- Sydney Sixers won the toss and elected to bat.
- Broadcast by Seven Network and Foxtel

Match 5
16 October 2022
10:15
Scorecard

Adelaide Strikers; 7/126 (20 overs)	v	Melbourne Renegades; 6/128 (19.5 overs)
Madeline Penna 36 (43); Sophie Molineux 4/23 (4 overs)		Sophie Molineux 32 (35); Megan Schutt 2/23 (4 overs)

Melbourne Renegades won by 4 wickets (with 1 ball remaining)
Great Barrier Reef Arena, Mackay
Umpires: David Taylor and Nathan James
Player of the match: Sophie Molineux (Melbourne Renegades)

- Melbourne Renegades won the toss and elected to field.
- Broadcast by Seven Network and Foxtel

Match 13
21 October 2022
15:25
Scorecard

Adelaide Strikers; 6/142 (20 overs)	v	Sydney Sixers; 8/139 (20 overs)
Madeline Penna 39* (25); Sophie Ecclestone 2/15 (4 overs)		Erin Burns 71 (38); Darcie Brown 3/17 (4 overs)

Adelaide Strikers won by 3 runs
Karen Rolton Oval, Adelaide
Umpires: Harsimran Singh and Kurt Miegel
Player of the match: Erin Burns (Sydney Sixers)

- Sydney Sixers won the toss and elected to field.
- Broadcast by cricket.com.au and Foxtel
- Ellyse Perry (Sydney Sixers) became the first player to captain 100 WBBL games.

Match 17
24 October 2022
15:30
Scorecard

Melbourne Renegades; 101 (19.5 overs)	v	Adelaide Strikers; 2/102 (17 overs)
Carly Leeson 35 (33); Amanda-Jade Wellington 5/8 (3.5 overs)		Deandra Dottin 55* (55); Sarah Coyte 2/19 (3 overs)

Adelaide Strikers won by 8 wickets (with 18 balls remaining)
Karen Rolton Oval, Adelaide
Umpires: Dhaval Bhatt and Eloise Sheridan
Player of the match: Amanda-Jade Wellington (Adelaide Strikers)

- Adelaide Strikers won the toss and elected to field.
- Broadcast by cricket.com.au and Foxtel
- Amanda-Jade Wellington (Adelaide Strikers) equalled the WBBL record for best bowling figures in an innings.

Match 19
27 October 2022
19:10 (N)
Scorecard

Adelaide Strikers; 8/140 (20 overs)	v	Brisbane Heat; 109 (16.4 overs)
Laura Wolvaardt 46 (40); Jess Jonassen 3/17 (4 overs)		Charli Knott 29 (29); Megan Schutt 4/11 (3.4 overs)

Adelaide Strikers won by 31 runs
Allan Border Field, Brisbane
Umpires: Joshua Adie and Sharad Patel
Player of the match: Darcie Brown (Adelaide Strikers)

- Brisbane Heat won the toss and elected to field.
- Broadcast by Seven Network and Foxtel

Match 20
28 October 2022
15:15
Scorecard

Perth Scorchers; 5/111 (20 overs)	v	Adelaide Strikers; 4/112 (18.3 overs)
Beth Mooney 34 (34); Amanda-Jade Wellington 2/13 (4 overs)		Katie Mack 47* (51); Lilly Mills 3/17 (3 overs)

Adelaide Strikers won by 6 wickets (with 9 balls remaining)
Allan Border Field, Brisbane
Umpires: Benjamin Farrell and Tom Logan
Player of the match: Katie Mack (Adelaide Strikers)

- Perth Scorchers won the toss and elected to bat.
- Broadcast by cricket.com.au and Foxtel

Match 26
2 November 2022
15:30
Scorecard

Melbourne Stars; 5/186 (20 overs)	v	Adelaide Strikers; 8/164 (20 overs)
Tess Flintoff 51* (16); Deandra Dottin 2/34 (4 overs)		Katie Mack 47 (38); Sasha Moloney 4/24 (4 overs)

Melbourne Stars won by 22 runs
North Sydney Oval, Sydney
Umpires: Bede Sajowitz and Daniel Moran
Player of the match: Tess Flintoff (Melbourne Stars)

- Adelaide Strikers won the toss and elected to field.
- Broadcast by cricket.com.au and Foxtel
- Venue changed from Blacktown ISP Oval to North Sydney Oval
- Tess Flintoff (Melbourne Stars) set a new WBBL record for the fastest half-century (16 balls).

Match 30
5 November 2022
13:00
Scorecard

Melbourne Stars; 8/112 (20 overs)	v	Adelaide Strikers; 5/113 (19.1 overs)
Annabel Sutherland 47 (41); Amanda-Jade Wellington 3/20 (4 overs)		Madeline Penna 56* (50); Annabel Sutherland 2/19 (4 overs)

Adelaide Strikers won by 5 wickets (with 5 balls remaining)
Lilac Hill Park, Perth
Umpires: Ashlee Gibbons and Jarryd Buscall
Player of the match: Madeline Penna (Adelaide Strikers)

- Adelaide Strikers won the toss and elected to field
- Broadcast by cricket.com.au and Foxtel

Match 34
6 November 2022
16:50
Scorecard

Perth Scorchers; 9/119 (20 overs)	v	Adelaide Strikers; 3/120 (16 overs)
Sophie Devine 37 (33); Megan Schutt 4/20 (4 overs)		Deandra Dottin 68 (51); Piepa Cleary 2/29 (3 overs)

Adelaide Strikers won by 7 wickets (with 24 balls remaining)
Lilac Hill Park, Perth
Umpires: Jarryd Buscall and Trent Steenholdt
Player of the match: Megan Schutt (Adelaide Strikers)

- Perth Scorchers won the toss and elected to bat.
- Broadcast by cricket.com.au and Foxtel

Match 38
11 November 2022
18:00 (D/N)
Scorecard

Hobart Hurricanes; 4/152 (20 overs)	v	Adelaide Strikers; 4/129 (20 overs)
Heather Graham 50 (34); Amanda-Jade Wellington 2/31 (4 overs)		Laura Wolvaardt 45 (38); Molly Strano 2/21 (4 overs)

Hobart Hurricanes won by 23 runs
Karen Rolton Oval, Adelaide
Umpires: Eloise Sheridan and Harsimran Singh
Player of the match: Heather Graham (Hobart Hurricanes)

- Adelaide Strikers won the toss and elected to field.
- Broadcast by cricket.com.au and Foxtel

Match 44
13 November 2022
15:00
Scorecard

Adelaide Strikers; 3/92 (14.3 overs)	v	Sydney Thunder
Katie Mack 29 (28); Samantha Bates 1/10 (2.3 overs)

No result
Centennial Park Oval, Nuriootpa
Umpires: Dhaval Bhatt and Kurt Miegel

- Sydney Thunder won the toss and elected to field.
- No further play was possible due to rain.
- Broadcast by cricket.com.au and Foxtel

Match 45
14 November 2022
18:00 (D/N)
Scorecard

Brisbane Heat; 6/114 (16 overs)	v	Adelaide Strikers; 115 (16 overs)
Amelia Kerr 32 (28); Megan Schutt 3/38 (4 overs)		Laura Wolvaardt 45 (38); Amelia Kerr 3/26 (4 overs)

Brisbane Heat won by 2 runs (DLS method)
Karen Rolton Oval, Adelaide
Umpires: Dhaval Bhatt and Harsimran Singh
Player of the match: Amelia Kerr (Brisbane Heat)

- Brisbane Heat won the toss and elected to bat.
- The match was reduced to 16 overs per side due to rain. Adelaide Strikers were set a revised target of 118 for victory.
- Broadcast by cricket.com.au and Foxtel

Match 50
18 November 2022
15:40
Scorecard

Hobart Hurricanes; 154 (19.4 overs)	v	Adelaide Strikers; 2/155 (14.5 overs)
Mignon du Preez 75 (47); Jemma Barsby 3/27 (4 overs)		Tahlia McGrath 93* (51); Nicola Carey 1/11 (2 overs)

Adelaide Strikers won by 8 wickets (with 31 balls remaining)
North Sydney Oval, Sydney
Umpires: Andrew Hamilton and Troy Penman
Player of the match: Tahlia McGrath (Adelaide Strikers)

- Adelaide Strikers won the toss and elected to field.
- Broadcast by Seven Network and Foxtel

Match 56
20 November 2022
17:15 (D/N)
Scorecard

Adelaide Strikers; 4/144 (20 overs)	v	Sydney Thunder; 118 (19.3 overs)
Laura Wolvaardt 75* (56); Hannah Darlington 2/36 (4 overs)		Tammy Beaumont 37 (27); Megan Schutt 6/19 (3.3 overs)

Adelaide Strikers won by 26 runs
North Sydney Oval, Sydney
Umpires: Roberto Howard and Sharad Patel
Player of the match: Megan Schutt (Adelaide Strikers)

- Sydney Thunder won the toss and elected to field.
- Broadcast by Seven Network and Foxtel
- Megan Schutt (Adelaide Strikers) set a new WBBL record for best bowling figures in an innings.
- Former Australian player Rachael Haynes (Sydney Thunder) made her last WBBL appearance.

=== Challenger ===
24 November 2022
19:10 (N)
Scorecard

Brisbane Heat; 8/154 (20 overs)	v	Adelaide Strikers; 4/156 (19.4 overs)
Amelia Kerr 43 (32); Megan Schutt 3/26 (4 overs)		Laura Wolvaardt 47 (45); Charli Knott 1/27 (3 overs)

Adelaide Strikers won by 6 wickets (with 2 balls remaining)
Karen Rolton Oval, Adelaide
Umpires: Troy Penman and Eloise Sheridan
Player of the match: Bridget Patterson (Adelaide Strikers)

- Brisbane Heat won the toss and elected to bat.
- Broadcast by Seven Network and Foxtel

=== Final ===
26 November 2022
17:20 (D/N)
Scorecard

Adelaide Strikers; 5/147 (20 overs)	v	Sydney Sixers; 137 (20 overs)
Deandra Dottin 52* (37); Sophie Ecclestone 2/19 (4 overs)		Maitlan Brown 34 (17); Darcie Brown 2/15 (4 overs)

Adelaide Strikers won by 10 runs
North Sydney Oval, Sydney
Attendance: 6,478
Umpires: Claire Polosak and Eloise Sheridan
Player of the match: Deandra Dottin (Adelaide Strikers)

- Adelaide Strikers won the toss and elected to bat.
- Broadcast by Seven Network and Foxtel
- Former Australian player Nicole Bolton (Sydney Sixers) made her last WBBL appearance.
- Adelaide Strikers won their first WBBL title.

== Statistics and awards ==
- Most runs: Laura Wolvaardt – 403 (3rd in the league)
- Highest score in an innings: Laura Wolvaardt – 75* (56) vs Sydney Thunder, 20 November 2022
- Most wickets: Megan Schutt – 27 (1st in the league)
- Best bowling figures in an innings: Megan Schutt – 6/19 (3.3 overs) vs Sydney Thunder, 20 November 2022
- Most catches (fielder): Bridget Patterson – 12 (equal 2nd in the league)
- Player of the Match awards:
  - Megan Schutt – 2
  - Darcie Brown, Deandra Dottin, Katie Mack, Tahlia McGrath, Bridget Patterson, Madeline Penna, Amanda-Jade Wellington – 1 each
- WBBL|08 Player of the Tournament: Megan Schutt (equal 3rd)
- WBBL|08 Team of the Tournament: Megan Schutt, Amanda-Jade Wellington
- Strikers Most Valuable Player: Megan Schutt
