= 2022–23 Brisbane Heat WBBL season =

Women's Big Bash cricket season

Brisbane Heat
2022–23 season
- Coach: Ashley Noffke
- Captain(s): Jess Jonassen
- Home ground: Allan Border Field
- League: WBBL
- Record: 8–5 (3rd)
- Finals: Lost the Challenger
- Leading Run Scorer: Georgia Redmayne – 354
- Leading Wicket Taker: Jess Jonassen – 25
- Player of the Season: Amelia Kerr

The 2022–23 Brisbane Heat Women's season was the eighth in the team's history. Coached by Ashley Noffke and captained by Jess Jonassen, the Heat finished the regular season of WBBL|08 in third position. For the second year in a row, they were eliminated from the tournament during the knockout phase by the Adelaide Strikers.

== Squad ==
Each 2022–23 squad was made up of 15 active players. Teams could sign up to five 'marquee players', with a maximum of three of those from overseas. Marquees were classed as any overseas player, or a local player who holds a Cricket Australia national contract at the start of the WBBL|08 signing period.

Personnel changes made ahead of the season included:

- South African marquees Anneke Bosch and Nadine de Klerk did not re-sign with the Heat.
- Indian marquee Poonam Yadav did not re-sign with the Heat.
- New Zealand marquee Amelia Kerr returned to the Heat, following a season's absence.
- English marquee Danni Wyatt signed with the Heat, having previously played four seasons for the Melbourne Renegades.
- Indian marquee Pooja Vastrakar signed with the Heat, marking her first appearance in the league.
- New Zealand marquee Jess Kerr signed as a replacement player, marking her first appearance in the league.
- Georgia Prestwidge departed the Heat, signing with the Melbourne Renegades.

The table below lists the Heat players and their key stats (including runs scored, batting strike rate, wickets taken, economy rate, catches and stumpings) for the season.

| No. | Name | Nat. | Birth date | Batting style | Bowling style | G | R | SR | W | E | C | S | Notes |
Batters
| 4 | Laura Harris | (Australia) | 18 August 1990 | Right-handed | – | 16 | 270 | 204.54 | – | – | 6 | – | |
| 14 | Mikayla Hinkley | (Australia) | 1 May 1998 | Right-handed | Right-arm medium | 2 | 1 | 50.00 | – | – | 1 | – | |
| 13 | Georgia Voll | (Australia) | 5 August 2003 | Right-handed | Right-arm off spin | 16 | 262 | 107.81 | 1 | 11.45 | 2 | – | |
| 28 | Danni Wyatt | (England) | 22 April 1991 | Right-handed | Right-arm off spin | 13 | 263 | 128.92 | – | – | 4 | – | Overseas marquee |
All-rounders
| 5 | Lucy Hamilton | (Australia) | 8 May 2006 | Left-handed | Left-arm fast | 2 | 5 | 71.42 | 0 | 8.25 | 0 | – | Replacement player |
| 44 | Nicola Hancock | (Australia) | 8 November 1995 | Right-handed | Right-arm medium | 16 | 28 | 127.27 | 22 | 8.41 | 8 | – | |
| 17 | Grace Harris | (Australia) | 18 September 1993 | Right-handed | Right-arm off spin | 16 | 297 | 110.40 | – | – | 6 | – | |
| 48 | Amelia Kerr | (New Zealand) | 13 October 2000 | Right-handed | Right-arm leg spin | 16 | 295 | 118.47 | 21 | 6.91 | 7 | – | Overseas marquee |
| 88 | Charli Knott | (Australia) | 5 May 2003 | Right-handed | Right-arm off spin | 16 | 143 | 112.59 | 7 | 7.07 | 3 | – | |
Wicket-keeper
| 77 | Ellie Johnston | (New Zealand) | 29 January 2003 | Right-handed | Right-arm leg spin | 7 | 68 | 121.42 | – | – | 0 | 0 | † × 4 inns |
| 8 | Georgia Redmayne | (Australia) | 8 December 1993 | Left-handed | – | 12 | 354 | 109.93 | – | – | 5 | 9 | † × 12 inns |
Bowlers
| 35 | Zoe Cooke | (Australia) | 17 September 1995 | Right-handed | Right-arm medium | – | – | – | – | – | – | – | |
| 21 | Jess Jonassen | (Australia) | 5 November 1992 | Left-handed | Left-arm orthodox | 16 | 148 | 134.54 | 25 | 6.94 | 5 | – | Captain, Australian marquee |
| 24 | Jess Kerr | (New Zealand) | 18 January 1998 | Right-handed | Right-arm medium | 9 | – | – | 6 | 6.16 | 7 | – | Overseas marquee (replacement) |
| 34 | Grace Parsons | (Australia) | 18 August 2003 | Right-handed | Right-arm leg spin | – | – | – | – | – | – | – | |
| 37 | Courtney Sippel | (Australia) | 27 April 2001 | Left-handed | Right-arm medium | 14 | 6 | 150.00 | 12 | 7.86 | 3 | – | |
| 25 | Pooja Vastrakar | (India) | 25 September 1999 | Right-handed | Right-arm medium | 7 | 32 | 177.77 | 2 | 8.15 | 1 | – | Overseas marquee |

== Ladder ==
| Pos | Team | Pld | W | L | NR | Pts | NRR |
|---|---|---|---|---|---|---|---|
| 1 | Sydney Sixers (RU) | 14 | 11 | 2 | 1 | 23 | 0.695 |
| 2 | Adelaide Strikers (C) | 14 | 8 | 5 | 1 | 17 | 0.390 |
| 3 | Brisbane Heat (CF) | 14 | 8 | 5 | 1 | 17 | 0.276 |
| 4 | Hobart Hurricanes (EF) | 14 | 7 | 6 | 1 | 15 | 0.457 |
| 5 | Perth Scorchers | 14 | 6 | 7 | 1 | 13 | 0.373 |
| 6 | Melbourne Stars | 14 | 5 | 6 | 3 | 13 | −0.339 |
| 7 | Melbourne Renegades | 14 | 4 | 9 | 1 | 9 | −1.042 |
| 8 | Sydney Thunder | 14 | 1 | 10 | 3 | 5 | −1.000 |

Source: cricket.com.au, ESPN Cricinfo
- The top 4 teams advanced to the play-off phase

== Fixtures ==
All times are AEDT.

=== Regular season ===
Match 1
13 October 2022
19:40 (N)
Scorecard

| Brisbane Heat; 8/141 (20 overs) | v | Sydney Sixers; 6/143 (19.5 overs) |
| Georgia Redmayne 49 (39); Maitlan Brown 3/20 (3 overs) | | Ellyse Perry 55 (48); Jess Kerr 2/17 (4 overs) |

Sydney Sixers won by 4 wickets (with 1 ball remaining)
Great Barrier Reef Arena, Mackay
Umpires: Claire Polosak and Nathan James
Player of the match: Ellyse Perry (Sydney Sixers)

- Sydney Sixers won the toss and elected to field.
- Broadcast by Seven Network and Foxtel

Match 4
15 October 2022
19:05 (N)
Scorecard

| Brisbane Heat; 3/179 (20 overs) | v | Melbourne Stars; 8/170 (20 overs) |
| Ellie Johnston 54 (34); Alice Capsey 1/19 (2 overs); Sophie Day 1/19 (2 overs) | | Lauren Winfield-Hill 74 (51); Jess Jonassen 3/36 (4 overs) |

Brisbane Heat won by 9 runs
Great Barrier Reef Arena, Mackay
Umpires: Claire Polosak and Michael Mellifont
Player of the match: Ellie Johnston (Brisbane Heat)

- Brisbane Heat won the toss and elected to bat.
- Broadcast by Seven Network and Foxtel

Match 9
18 October 2022
15:30
Scorecard

| Brisbane Heat; 1/180 (20 overs) | v | Melbourne Renegades; 6/159 (20 overs) |
| Georgia Redmayne 98* (67); Shabnim Ismail 1/31 (4 overs) | | Hayley Matthews 35 (19); Amelia Kerr 2/27 (4 overs) |

Brisbane Heat won by 21 runs
Great Barrier Reef Arena, Mackay
Umpires: Michael Mellifont and Nathan James
Player of the match: Georgia Redmayne (Brisbane Heat)

- Melbourne Renegades won the toss and elected to field.
- Broadcast by cricket.com.au and Foxtel

Match 12
21 October 2022
12:00
Scorecard

| Brisbane Heat; 8/163 (20 overs) | v | Melbourne Renegades; 137 (19 overs) |
| Georgia Voll 52 (37); Shabnim Ismail 1/23 (4 overs) | | Courtney Webb 47* (40); Charli Knott 3/19 (4 overs) |

Brisbane Heat won by 26 runs
Karen Rolton Oval, Adelaide
Umpires: Harsimran Singh and James Cushway
Player of the match: Georgia Voll (Brisbane Heat)

- Melbourne Renegades won the toss and elected to field.
- Broadcast by cricket.com.au and Foxtel

Match 18
25 October 2022
18:15 (D/N)
Scorecard

| Sydney Thunder; 7/139 (20 overs) | v | Brisbane Heat; 5/120 (17.2 overs) |
| Phoebe Litchfield 50 (38); Jess Jonassen 2/20 (4 overs) | | Georgia Redmayne 33 (36); Lea Tahuhu 3/31 (4 overs) |

Brisbane Heat won by 3 runs (DLS method)
Allan Border Field, Brisbane
Umpires: Benjamin Farrell and Tom Logan
Player of the match: Amelia Kerr (Brisbane Heat)

- Sydney Thunder won the toss and elected to bat.
- Brisbane Heat were set a revised target of 118 runs from 17.2 overs.
- Broadcast by cricket.com.au and Foxtel

Match 19
27 October 2022
19:10 (N)
Scorecard

| Adelaide Strikers; 8/140 (20 overs) | v | Brisbane Heat; 109 (16.4 overs) |
| Laura Wolvaardt 46 (40); Jess Jonassen 3/17 (4 overs) | | Charli Knott 29 (29); Megan Schutt 4/11 (3.4 overs) |

Adelaide Strikers won by 31 runs
Allan Border Field, Brisbane
Umpires: Joshua Adie and Sharad Patel
Player of the match: Darcie Brown (Adelaide Strikers)

- Brisbane Heat won the toss and elected to field.
- Broadcast by Seven Network and Foxtel

Match 23
29 October 2022
19:10 (N)
Scorecard

| Perth Scorchers; 7/140 (20 overs) | v | Brisbane Heat; 7/137 (20 overs) |
| Amy Edgar 36* (26); Jess Jonassen 3/22 (4 overs) | | Danni Wyatt 34 (29); Lilly Mills 2/19 (2 overs) |

Perth Scorchers won by 3 runs
Allan Border Field, Brisbane
Umpires: Eloise Sheridan and Nathan Jones
Player of the match: Amy Edgar (Perth Scorchers)

- Perth Scorchers won the toss and elected to bat.
- Broadcast by Seven Network and Foxtel

Match 29
4 November 2022
15:30
Scorecard

| Brisbane Heat; 3/163 (20 overs) | v | Sydney Thunder; 9/149 (20 overs) |
| Grace Harris 74 (54); Belinda Vakarewa 3/21 (4 overs) | | Sammy-Jo Johnson 41 (41); Jess Jonassen 3/20 (4 overs) |

Brisbane Heat won by 14 runs
Blundstone Arena, Hobart
Umpires: Jeremiah Matibiri and Simon Burns
Player of the match: Grace Harris (Brisbane Heat)

- Brisbane Heat won the toss and elected to bat.
- Broadcast by cricket.com.au and Foxtel

Match 32
6 November 2022
10:15
Scorecard

| Hobart Hurricanes; 7/164 (20 overs) | v | Brisbane Heat; 6/168 (19.4 overs) |
| Mignon du Preez 73* (54); Nicola Hancock 4/32 (4 overs) | | Laura Harris 68* (29); Molly Strano 2/17 (4 overs) |

Brisbane Heat won by 4 wickets (with 2 balls remaining)
Blundstone Arena, Hobart
Umpires: Eloise Sheridan and Jeremiah Matibiri
Player of the match: Laura Harris (Brisbane Heat)

- Brisbane Heat won the toss and elected to field.
- Broadcast by Seven Network and Foxtel

Match 36
9 November 2022
15:00
Scorecard

| Brisbane Heat; 7/153 (20 overs) | v | Perth Scorchers; 8/120 (20 overs) |
| Georgia Redmayne 28* (27); Alana King 2/24 (4 overs) | | Maddy Green 58 (53); Nicola Hancock 3/26 (4 overs) |

Brisbane Heat won by 33 runs
Lilac Hill Park, Perth
Umpires: Ashlee Gibbons and Jamie Thomas
Player of the match: Amelia Kerr (Brisbane Heat)

- Perth Scorchers won the toss and elected to field.
- Broadcast by cricket.com.au and Foxtel

Match 41
12 November 2022
18:00 (D/N)
Scorecard

| Brisbane Heat; 6/100 (13 overs) | v | Hobart Hurricanes; 4/101 (12.3 overs) |
| Grace Harris 41 (30); Hayley Jensen 1/9 (2 overs) | | Mignon du Preez 37 (29); Nicola Hancock 2/20 (2 overs) |

Hobart Hurricanes won by 6 wickets (with 3 balls remaining)
Karen Rolton Oval, Adelaide
Umpires: Dhaval Bhatt and Eloise Sheridan
Player of the match: Mignon du Preez (Hobart Hurricanes)

- Hobart Hurricanes won the toss and elected to field.
- Match reduced to 13 overs per side due to rain delay.
- Broadcast by cricket.com.au and Foxtel

Match 45
14 November 2022
18:00 (D/N)
Scorecard

| Brisbane Heat; 6/114 (16 overs) | v | Adelaide Strikers; 115 (16 overs) |
| Amelia Kerr 32 (28); Megan Schutt 3/38 (4 overs) | | Laura Wolvaardt 45 (38); Amelia Kerr 3/26 (4 overs) |

Brisbane Heat won by 2 runs (DLS method)
Karen Rolton Oval, Adelaide
Umpires: Dhaval Bhatt and Harsimran Singh
Player of the match: Amelia Kerr (Brisbane Heat)

- Brisbane Heat won the toss and elected to bat.
- The match was reduced to 16 overs per side due to rain. Adelaide Strikers were set a revised target of 118 for victory.
- Broadcast by cricket.com.au and Foxtel

Match 49
16 November 2022
19:10 (N)
Scorecard

| Brisbane Heat; 5/163 (20 overs) | v | Sydney Sixers; 5/164 (19.3 overs) |
| Jess Jonassen 38* (21); Kate Peterson 4/17 (4 overs) | | Erin Burns 51* (32); Jess Kerr 1/29 (4 overs) |

Sydney Sixers won by 5 wickets (with 3 balls remaining)
North Sydney Oval, Sydney
Umpires: Andrew Hamilton and Bede Sajowitz
Player of the match: Erin Burns (Sydney Sixers)

- Sydney Sixers won the toss and elected to field.
- Broadcast by cricket.com.au and Foxtel

Match 55
20 November 2022
14:00
Scorecard

| Brisbane Heat; 4/105 (10 overs) | v | Melbourne Stars; 1/49 (3.5 overs) |
| Danni Wyatt 52 (24); Sasha Moloney 2/12 (2 overs) | | Lauren Winfield-Hill 22* (13); Amelia Kerr 1/4 (0.5 overs) |

No result
Ted Summerton Reserve, Moe
Umpires: Chris Grant and Mattis van Eck

- Melbourne Stars won the toss and elected to field.
- Match reduced to 10 overs per side due to rain.
- No further play was possible due to rain.
- Broadcast by cricket.com.au and Foxtel

=== Eliminator ===
23 November 2022
19:10 (N)
Scorecard

| Brisbane Heat; 7/179 (20 overs) | v | Hobart Hurricanes; 9/135 (20 overs) |
| Danni Wyatt 52 (38); Amy Smith 3/21 (4 overs) | | Lizelle Lee 47 (42); Jess Jonassen 4/23 (4 overs) |

Brisbane Heat won by 44 runs
Karen Rolton Oval, Adelaide
Umpires: Claire Polosak and Stephen Dionysius
Player of the match: Laura Harris (Brisbane Heat)

- Hobart Hurricanes won the toss and elected to field.
- Broadcast by Seven Network and Foxtel

=== Challenger ===
24 November 2022
19:10 (N)
Scorecard

| Brisbane Heat; 8/154 (20 overs) | v | Adelaide Strikers; 4/156 (19.4 overs) |
| Amelia Kerr 43 (32); Megan Schutt 3/26 (4 overs) | | Laura Wolvaardt 47 (45); Charli Knott 1/27 (3 overs) |

Adelaide Strikers won by 6 wickets (with 2 balls remaining)
Karen Rolton Oval, Adelaide
Umpires: Troy Penman and Eloise Sheridan
Player of the match: Bridget Patterson (Adelaide Strikers)

- Brisbane Heat won the toss and elected to bat.
- Broadcast by Seven Network and Foxtel

== Statistics and awards ==
- Most runs: Georgia Redmayne – 354 (6th in the league)
- Highest score in an innings: Georgia Redmayne – 98* (67) vs Melbourne Renegades, 18 October 2022
- Most wickets: Jess Jonassen – 25 (2nd in the league)
- Best bowling figures in an innings: Jess Jonassen – 4/23 (4 overs) vs Hobart Hurricanes, 23 November 2022
- Most catches (fielder): Nicola Hancock – 8 (equal 8th in the league)
- Player of the Match awards:
  - Amelia Kerr – 3
  - Laura Harris – 2
  - Grace Harris, Ellie Johnston, Georgia Redmayne, Georgia Voll – 1 each
- WBBL|08 Player of the Tournament: Amelia Kerr (2nd)
- WBBL|08 Team of the Tournament: Nicola Hancock, Jess Jonassen, Amelia Kerr, Georgia Redmayne
- Brisbane Heat MVP: Amelia Kerr
