= 2022–23 Hobart Hurricanes WBBL season =

Hobart Hurricanes
2022–23 season
- Coach: Dan Marsh
- Captain(s): Elyse Villani
- Home ground: Blundstone Arena
- League: WBBL
- Record: 7–6 (4th)
- Finals: Lost the Eliminator
- Leading Run Scorer: Mignon du Preez – 380
- Leading Wicket Taker: Molly Strano – 18

The 2022–23 Hobart Hurricanes Women's season was the eighth in the team's history. Coached by Dan Marsh and captained by Elyse Villani, the Hurricanes finished the regular season of WBBL|08 in fourth place and qualified for the finals for the first time since WBBL|02. They were eliminated from the knockout phase of the tournament, losing to the Brisbane Heat in the Eliminator.

== Squad ==
Each 2022–23 squad was made up of 15 active players. Teams could sign up to five 'marquee players', with a maximum of three of those from overseas. Marquees were defined as any overseas player, or a local player who holds a Cricket Australia national contract at the start of the WBBL|08 signing period.

Personnel changes made ahead of the season included:

- Australian marquee Tayla Vlaeminck departed the Hurricanes, returning to the Melbourne Renegades.
- Belinda Vakarewa departed the Hurricanes, returning to the Sydney Thunder.
- New Zealand marquee Rachel Priest did not re-sign with the Hurricanes.
- Indian marquee Richa Ghosh did not re-sign with the Hurricanes.
- South African marquee Lizelle Lee signed with the Hurricanes, having previously played for the Melbourne Stars and Melbourne Renegades.
- English marquee Issy Wong signed with the Hurricanes, having previously played for the Sydney Thunder. Wong would be made unavailable to participate in the season due to injury.
- New Zealand marquee Hayley Jensen returned to the Hurricanes, signing as a replacement player.
- Sasha Moloney departed the Hurricanes, signing with the Melbourne Stars.
- Angelina Genford departed the Hurricanes, signing with the Sydney Sixers.
- Heather Graham signed with the Hurricanes, having previously played for the Perth Scorchers.
- Elyse Villani signed with the Hurricanes, having previously played for the Perth Scorchers and Melbourne Stars. Villani was also appointed captain of the team, replacing Rachel Priest.
- Hayley Silver-Holmes signed with the Hurricanes, having previously played for the Sydney Sixers.
- Dan Marsh was appointed head coach, replacing Salliann Beams.

The table below lists the Hurricanes players and their key stats (including runs scored, batting strike rate, wickets taken, economy rate, catches and stumpings) for the season.

No.	Name	Nat.	Birth date	Batting style	Bowling style	G	R	SR	W	E	C	S	Notes
Batters
22	Mignon du Preez	(South Africa)	13 June 1989	Right-handed	–	15	380	121.40	–	–	3	–	Overseas marquee
10	Naomi Stalenberg	(Australia)	18 April 1994	Right-handed	Right-arm medium	13	59	118.00	–	–	3	–	
8	Rachel Trenaman	(Australia)	18 April 2001	Right-handed	Right-arm leg spin	12	131	89.72	–	–	7	–	
2	Elyse Villani	(Australia)	6 October 1989	Right-handed	Right-arm medium	15	230	104.07	–	–	6	–	Captain
All-rounders
16	Nicola Carey	(Australia)	10 September 1993	Left-handed	Right-arm medium	15	169	115.75	14	8.31	3	–	Australian marquee
28	Ruth Johnston	(Australia)	28 February 2003	Right-handed	Right-arm off spin	14	103	122.61	5	6.50	3	–	
11	Heather Graham	(Australia)	10 May 1996	Right-handed	Right-arm medium	13	258	122.27	10	8.00	3	–	
Wicket-keeper
67	Lizelle Lee	(South Africa)	2 April 1992	Right-handed	–	15	296	117.92	–	–	6	2	Overseas marquee
21	Emma Manix-Geeves	(Australia)	12 August 2000	Right-handed	–	2	20	95.23	–	–	0	–	
Bowlers
	Julia Cavanough	(Australia)	17 March 2004	Right-handed	Left-arm fast medium	–	–	–	–	–	–	–	
13	Maisy Gibson	(Australia)	14 September 1996	Left-handed	Right-arm leg spin	14	7	89.47	12	6.57	4	–	
87	Hayley Jensen	(New Zealand)	7 October 1992	Right-handed	Right-arm fast medium	14	22	66.66	7	7.32	2	–	Overseas marquee (replacement)
4	Hayley Silver-Holmes	(Australia)	18 August 2003	Right-handed	Right-arm medium	–	–	–	–	–	–	–	
14	Amy Smith	(Australia)	16 November 2004	Right-handed	Right-arm leg spin	8	8	66.66	5	5.78	6	–	
26	Molly Strano	(Australia)	5 October 1992	Right-handed	Right-arm off spin	15	17	94.44	18	6.02	2	–	
	Issy Wong	(England)	15 May 2002	Right-handed	Right-arm fast medium	–	–	–	–	–	–	–	Overseas marquee (unavailable)

== Ladder ==
Pos	Team	Pld	W	L	NR	Pts	NRR
1	Sydney Sixers (RU)	14	11	2	1	23	0.695
2	Adelaide Strikers (C)	14	8	5	1	17	0.390
3	Brisbane Heat (CF)	14	8	5	1	17	0.276
4	Hobart Hurricanes (EF)	14	7	6	1	15	0.457
5	Perth Scorchers	14	6	7	1	13	0.373
6	Melbourne Stars	14	5	6	3	13	−0.339
7	Melbourne Renegades	14	4	9	1	9	−1.042
8	Sydney Thunder	14	1	10	3	5	−1.000

Source: cricket.com.au, ESPN Cricinfo
- The top 4 teams advanced to the play-off phase

== Fixtures ==
All times are AEDT.

=== Regular season ===
Match 2
14 October 2022
15:00
Scorecard

Hobart Hurricanes; 5/125 (20 overs)	v	Sydney Thunder; 9/106 (20 overs)
Mignon du Preez 33 (27); Chloe Tryon 2/14 (3 overs)		Tahlia Wilson 26 (30); Heather Graham 3/15 (4 overs)

Hobart Hurricanes won by 19 runs
Blacktown ISP Oval, Sydney
Umpires: Andrew Hamilton and Roberto Howard
Player of the match: Heather Graham (Hobart Hurricanes)

- Sydney Thunder won the toss and elected to field.
- Broadcast by cricket.com.au and Foxtel

Match 8
17 October 2022
19:05 (N)
Scorecard

Hobart Hurricanes; 9/109 (20 overs)	v	Perth Scorchers; 2/110 (14.1 overs)
Heather Graham 35 (28); Taneale Peschel 3/13 (4 overs)		Beth Mooney 38* (36); Ruth Johnston 1/13 (2 overs)

Perth Scorchers won by 8 wickets (with 35 balls remaining)
Blacktown ISP Oval, Sydney
Umpires: Andrew Hamilton and Roberto Howard
Player of the match: Maddy Green (Perth Scorchers)

- Perth Scorchers won the toss and elected to field.
- Broadcast by cricket.com.au and Foxtel

Match 10
18 October 2022
19:05 (N)
Scorecard

Hobart Hurricanes; 7/144 (20 overs)	v	Sydney Thunder; 95 (18.1 overs)
Lizelle Lee 41 (29); Sammy-Jo Johnson 3/34 (4 overs)		Phoebe Litchfield 28 (21); Heather Graham 2/13 (3.1 overs)

Hobart Hurricanes won by 49 runs
Blacktown ISP Oval, Sydney
Umpires: Andrew Hamilton and Daniel Moran
Player of the match: Lizelle Lee (Hobart Hurricanes)

- Sydney Thunder won the toss and elected to field.
- Broadcast by cricket.com.au and Foxtel

Match 16
23 October 2022
17:15
Scorecard

Perth Scorchers	v	Hobart Hurricanes

No result (abandoned with a toss)
WACA Ground, Perth
Umpires: Ashlee Gibbons and Sue Redfern

- Hobart Hurricanes won the toss and elected to field.
- Broadcast by Seven Network and Foxtel
- No play was possible due to rain.

Match 21
29 October 2022
10:15
Scorecard

Hobart Hurricanes; 8/95 (12 overs)	v	Sydney Sixers; 2/96 (10.5 overs)
Mignon du Preez 26 (19); Ashleigh Gardner 4/23 (3 overs)		Ashleigh Gardner 43 (22); Molly Strano 1/16 (3 overs)

Sydney Sixers won by 8 wickets (with 7 balls remaining)
Eastern Oval, Ballarat
Umpires: Chris Grant and Greg Azzopardi
Player of the match: Ashleigh Gardner (Sydney Sixers)

- Sydney Sixers won the toss and elected to field.
- Match reduced to 12 overs due to rain.
- Broadcast by cricket.com.au and Foxtel

Match 28
3 November 2022
19:10 (N)
Scorecard

Melbourne Renegades; 5/133 (20 overs)	v	Hobart Hurricanes; 6/137 (18.1 overs)
Chamari Athapaththu 75* (59); Maisy Gibson 4/24 (4 overs)		Heather Graham 39* (26); Sophie Molineux 2/31 (3.1 overs)

Hobart Hurricanes won by 4 wickets (with 11 balls remaining)
Blundstone Arena, Hobart
Umpires: Muhammad Qureshi and Troy Penman
Player of the match: Maisy Gibson (Hobart Hurricanes)

- Hobart Hurricanes won the toss and elected to field.
- Broadcast by Seven Network and Foxtel

Match 32
6 November 2022
10:15
Scorecard

Hobart Hurricanes; 7/164 (20 overs)	v	Brisbane Heat; 6/168 (19.4 overs)
Mignon du Preez 73* (54); Nicola Hancock 4/32 (4 overs)		Laura Harris 68* (29); Molly Strano 2/17 (4 overs)

Brisbane Heat won by 4 wickets (with 2 balls remaining)
Blundstone Arena, Hobart
Umpires: Eloise Sheridan and Jeremiah Matibiri
Player of the match: Laura Harris (Brisbane Heat)

- Brisbane Heat won the toss and elected to field.
- Broadcast by Seven Network and Foxtel

Match 35
7 November 2022
19:10 (N)
Scorecard

Melbourne Renegades; 80 (17.2 overs)	v	Hobart Hurricanes; 2/82 (10.4 overs)
Courtney Webb 30 (36); Molly Strano 4/16 (4 overs)		Elyse Villani 41* (34); Sophie Molineux 2/20 (3 overs)

Hobart Hurricanes won by 8 wickets (with 56 balls remaining)
Blundstone Arena, Hobart
Umpires: Greg Beechey and Jeremiah Matibiri
Player of the match: Molly Strano (Hobart Hurricanes)

- Hobart Hurricanes won the toss and elected to field.
- Broadcast by cricket.com.au and Foxtel

Match 38
11 November 2022
18:00 (D/N)
Scorecard

Hobart Hurricanes; 4/152 (20 overs)	v	Adelaide Strikers; 4/129 (20 overs)
Heather Graham 50 (34); Amanda-Jade Wellington 2/31 (4 overs)		Laura Wolvaardt 45 (38); Molly Strano 2/21 (4 overs)

Hobart Hurricanes won by 23 runs
Karen Rolton Oval, Adelaide
Umpires: Eloise Sheridan and Harsimran Singh
Player of the match: Heather Graham (Hobart Hurricanes)

- Adelaide Strikers won the toss and elected to field.
- Broadcast by cricket.com.au and Foxtel

Match 41
12 November 2022
18:00 (D/N)
Scorecard

Brisbane Heat; 6/100 (13 overs)	v	Hobart Hurricanes; 4/101 (12.3 overs)
Grace Harris 41 (30); Hayley Jensen 1/9 (2 overs)		Mignon du Preez 37 (29); Nicola Hancock 2/20 (2 overs)

Hobart Hurricanes won by 6 wickets (with 3 balls remaining)
Karen Rolton Oval, Adelaide
Umpires: Dhaval Bhatt and Eloise Sheridan
Player of the match: Mignon du Preez (Hobart Hurricanes)

- Hobart Hurricanes won the toss and elected to field.
- Match reduced to 13 overs per side due to rain delay.
- Broadcast by cricket.com.au and Foxtel

Match 46
15 November 2022
15:00
Scorecard

Hobart Hurricanes; 8/130 (20 overs)	v	Melbourne Stars; 6/132 (19.1 overs)
Nicola Carey 31 (33); Annabel Sutherland 3/18 (4 overs)		Alice Capsey 80* (52); Molly Strano 3/17 (4 overs)

Melbourne Stars won by 4 wickets (with 5 balls remaining)
Latrobe Recreation Ground, Latrobe
Umpires: Craig Seabourne and Muhammad Qureshi
Player of the match: Alice Capsey (Melbourne Stars)

- Melbourne Stars won the toss and elected to field.
- Broadcast by cricket.com.au and Foxtel

Match 48
16 November 2022
15:00
Scorecard

Hobart Hurricanes; 7/152 (20 overs)	v	Melbourne Stars; 6/114 (20 overs)
Mignon du Preez 50* (48); Alice Capsey 2/14 (3 overs)		Alice Capsey 38 (26); Hayley Jensen 2/24 (3 overs)

Hobart Hurricanes won by 38 runs
Latrobe Recreation Ground, Latrobe
Umpires: Craig Seabourne and Muhammad Qureshi
Player of the match: Mignon du Preez (Hobart Hurricanes)

- Melbourne Stars won the toss and elected to field.
- Broadcast by cricket.com.au and Foxtel

Match 50
18 November 2022
15:40
Scorecard

Hobart Hurricanes; 154 (19.4 overs)	v	Adelaide Strikers; 2/155 (14.5 overs)
Mignon du Preez 75 (47); Jemma Barsby 3/27 (4 overs)		Tahlia McGrath 93* (51); Nicola Carey 1/11 (2 overs)

Adelaide Strikers won by 8 wickets (with 31 balls remaining)
North Sydney Oval, Sydney
Umpires: Andrew Hamilton and Troy Penman
Player of the match: Tahlia McGrath (Adelaide Strikers)

- Adelaide Strikers won the toss and elected to field.
- Broadcast by Seven Network and Foxtel

Match 54
20 November 2022
13:40
Scorecard

Hobart Hurricanes; 156 (19.5 overs)	v	Sydney Sixers; 2/157 (18.5 overs)
Mignon du Preez 38 (29); Kate Peterson 3/31 (4 overs)		Ellyse Perry 56* (39); Ruth Johnston 1/30 (3.5 overs)

Sydney Sixers won by 8 wickets (with 7 balls remaining)
North Sydney Oval, Sydney
Umpires: Bede Sajowitz and Sharad Patel
Player of the match: Ellyse Perry (Sydney Sixers)

- Sydney Sixers won the toss and elected to field.
- Broadcast by Seven Network and Foxtel

=== Eliminator ===
23 November 2022
19:10 (N)
Scorecard

Brisbane Heat; 7/179 (20 overs)	v	Hobart Hurricanes; 9/135 (20 overs)
Danni Wyatt 52 (38); Amy Smith 3/21 (4 overs)		Lizelle Lee 47 (42); Jess Jonassen 4/23 (4 overs)

Brisbane Heat won by 44 runs
Karen Rolton Oval, Adelaide
Umpires: Claire Polosak and Stephen Dionysius
Player of the match: Laura Harris (Brisbane Heat)

- Hobart Hurricanes won the toss and elected to field.
- Broadcast by Seven Network and Foxtel

== Statistics and awards ==
- Most runs: Mignon du Preez – 380 (4th in the league)
- Highest score in an innings: Mignon du Preez – 75 (47) vs Adelaide Strikers, 18 November 2022
- Most wickets: Molly Strano – 18 (equal 10th in the league)
- Best bowling figures in an innings: Molly Strano – 4/16 (4 overs) vs Melbourne Renegades, 7 November 2022
- Most catches (fielder): Rachel Trenaman – 7 (equal 12th in the league)
- Player of the Match awards:
  - Mignon du Preez, Heather Graham – 2 each
  - Maisy Gibson, Lizelle Lee, Molly Strano – 1 each
- WBBL|08 Player of the Tournament: Mignon du Preez, Heather Graham (equal 6th)
- WBBL|08 Team of the Tournament: Molly Strano
