= 2022–23 Women's Big Bash League season =

Cricket tournament

2022–23 Women's Big Bash League
- Dates: 13 October 2022 – 26 November 2022
- Administrator: Cricket Australia
- Cricket format: Twenty20
- Tournament format(s): Double round-robin and knockout finals
- Champions: Adelaide Strikers (1st title)
- Runners-up: Sydney Sixers
- Participants: 8
- Matches: 59
- Player of the series: Ashleigh Gardner (SYS)
- Most runs: Beth Mooney (PRS) – 434
- Most wickets: Megan Schutt (ADS) – 27
- Official website: WBBL

The 2022–23 Women's Big Bash League season or WBBL|08 was the eighth season of the Women's Big Bash League (WBBL), the semi-professional women's Twenty20 domestic cricket competition in Australia. The tournament was played from 13 October to 26 November 2022. The Perth Scorchers entered the season as the defending champions, having won their maiden title in WBBL|07, but failed to qualify for the finals.

The Sydney Sixers won eleven games during the regular season—a new WBBL record—and finished on top of the points table for the fourth time in the team's history, thereby automatically qualifying (and earning host rights) for the Final. In the championship decider, played at North Sydney Oval, the Sixers were defeated in an upset by the Adelaide Strikers. Making a second-consecutive Final appearance, the Strikers won by ten runs to claim their first WBBL title. All-rounder Deandra Dottin was pivotal in her team's victory, contributing an unbeaten 52 runs with the bat and two wickets with the ball, and was subsequently named Player of the Match.

For the third-straight season, Perth Scorchers batter Beth Mooney was the competition's leading run-scorer. Adelaide Strikers fast bowler Megan Schutt led the league for wickets taken, and Sydney Sixers all-rounder Ashleigh Gardner became the first past-winner of the Young Gun Award to be named Player of the Tournament.

== Teams ==
Each squad is made up of 15 active players. Teams can sign up to five 'marquee players', with a maximum of three of those from overseas. Marquees are defined as any overseas player, or a local player who holds a Cricket Australia national contract at the start of the WBBL|08 signing period.

The table below lists each team's marquee players and other key details for the season.

Team	Home ground (Note: Number of games hosted at each venue is indicated in brackets)	Secondary grounds	Coach	Captain	Australian representatives (Note: Only includes players who debuted for Australia before the tournament)	Overseas players (Note: Kim Garth was classed as a local player for the Melbourne Stars in WBBL|08 due to her permanent residence in Australia and a lack of recent international cricket appearances for Ireland.; Anesu Mushangwe was approved as a local player for the Adelaide Strikers due to her permanent residence in Australia, despite having recently played international cricket for Zimbabwe.; Saskia Horley was approved as a local player for the Sydney Thunder due to her permanent residence in Australia, despite having recently played international cricket for Scotland.)
Adelaide; Strikers	Karen Rolton Oval (5)	Centennial Park Oval (1)	Luke Williams	Tahlia McGrath (Note: Megan Schutt stood in as acting captain for two games)	Darcie Brown; Tahlia McGrath; Megan Schutt; Amanda-Jade Wellington (Note: Player did not hold a Cricket Australia national contract at the beginning of the WBBL|08 signing period)	Deandra Dottin; Laura Wolvaardt
Brisbane; Heat	Allan Border Field (3)	Great Barrier Reef Arena (3)	Ashley Noffke	Jess Jonassen	Jess Jonassen; Grace Harris	Amelia Kerr; Jess Kerr; Pooja Vastrakar; Danni Wyatt
Hobart; Hurricanes	Blundstone Arena (3)	Latrobe Recreation Ground (2)	Dan Marsh	Elyse Villani	Nicola Carey; Heather Graham; Naomi Stalenberg; Molly Strano; Elyse Villani	Mignon du Preez; Hayley Jensen; Lizelle Lee; Issy Wong (Note: Unavailable for the season)
Melbourne; Renegades	CitiPower Centre (2)	Eastern Oval (2); Ted Summerton Reserve (1)	Simon Helmot	Sophie Molineux (Note: Hayley Matthews stood in as acting captain for two games)	Tayla Vlaeminck; Georgia Wareham; Sarah Coyte; Sophie Molineux	Chamari Athapaththu; Shabnim Ismail; Eve Jones; Harmanpreet Kaur; Hayley Matthews
Melbourne; Stars	CitiPower Centre (2)	Ted Summerton Reserve (2); Eastern Oval (1)	Jonathan Batty	Nicole Faltum	Meg Lanning; Annabel Sutherland	Alice Capsey; Bess Heath; Jemimah Rodrigues; Lauren Winfield-Hill
Perth; Scorchers	WACA Ground (3)	Lilac Hill Park (3)	Shelley Nitschke	Sophie Devine	Alana King; Beth Mooney; Holly Ferling	Sophie Devine; Maddy Green; Marizanne Kapp
Sydney; Sixers	North Sydney Oval (4)	–	Charlotte Edwards	Ellyse Perry	Ashleigh Gardner; Alyssa Healy; Ellyse Perry; Nicole Bolton; Erin Burns; Stella Campbell; Lauren Cheatle	Suzie Bates; Sophie Ecclestone
Sydney; Thunder	Blacktown ISP Oval (3)	North Sydney Oval (2); Manuka Oval (1)	Trevor Griffin	Rachael Haynes	Rachael Haynes; Hannah Darlington; Belinda Vakarewa	Tammy Beaumont; Amy Jones; Lea Tahuhu; Chloe Tryon

=== Personnel changes ===
==== Local players ====
The table below lists local player movements made ahead of the season.

Player	Departed	→	Joined	Notes	Ref(s)
Erin Osborne	Melbourne Stars	→	–	Retired	
Belinda Vakarewa	Hobart Hurricanes	→	Sydney Thunder	Returning to the Sydney Thunder	
Tayla Vlaeminck	Hobart Hurricanes	→	Melbourne Renegades	Australian marquee; Returning to the Melbourne Renegades; Unavailable for the season (injury)	
Heather Graham	Perth Scorchers	→	Hobart Hurricanes		
Sasha Moloney	Hobart Hurricanes	→	Melbourne Stars		
Elyse Villani	Melbourne Stars	→	Hobart Hurricanes	Third WBBL team (previously played for the Perth Scorchers)	
Jess Duffin	Melbourne Renegades	→	–	Unavailable for the season	
Hayley Silver-Holmes	Sydney Sixers	→	Hobart Hurricanes		
Sarah Coyte	Adelaide Strikers	→	Melbourne Renegades	Third WBBL team (previously played for the Sydney Sixers)	
Angelina Genford	Hobart Hurricanes	→	Sydney Sixers		
Holly Ferling	Melbourne Renegades	→	Perth Scorchers	Fourth WBBL team (previously played for the Brisbane Heat and Melbourne Stars)	
Georgia Prestwidge	Brisbane Heat	→	Melbourne Renegades		
Maddy Darke	Melbourne Stars	→	Perth Scorchers	Third WBBL team (previously played for the Sydney Sixers)	
Kate Peterson	Sydney Thunder	→	Sydney Sixers		
Saskia Horley	–	→	Sydney Thunder	Returning to the Sydney Thunder; Replacement player; Approved as local signing despite having recently played international cricket for Scotland	

==== Overseas players ====
The table below lists changes to overseas player allocations made before and during the season.

Player	Departed	→	Joined	Notes	Ref(s)
Amelia Kerr	–	→	Brisbane Heat	Returning to the Brisbane Heat	
Maddy Green	–	→	Perth Scorchers	Previously played for the Brisbane Heat	
Chamari Athapaththu	Perth Scorchers	→	Melbourne Renegades	Returning to the Melbourne Renegades; Replacement player	
Lizelle Lee	–	→	Hobart Hurricanes	Third WBBL team (previously played for the Melbourne Stars and Melbourne Renegades)	
Pooja Vastrakar	–	→	Brisbane Heat		
Deandra Dottin	–	→	Adelaide Strikers	Third WBBL team (previously played for the Perth Scorchers and Brisbane Heat)	
Issy Wong	Sydney Thunder	→	Hobart Hurricanes	Withdrew due to injury	
Hayley Matthews	–	→	Melbourne Renegades	Previously played for the Hobart Hurricanes	
Danni Wyatt	–	→	Brisbane Heat	Previously played for the Melbourne Renegades	
Shabnim Ismail	–	→	Melbourne Renegades	Returning to the Melbourne Renegades; Previously played for the Sydney Thunder	
Jemimah Rodrigues	Melbourne Renegades	→	Melbourne Stars		
Dane van Niekerk	Adelaide Strikers	→	–		
Anneke Bosch	Brisbane Heat	→	–		
Nadine de Klerk	Brisbane Heat	→	–		
Poonam Yadav	Brisbane Heat	→	–		
Rachel Priest	Hobart Hurricanes	→	–	Outgoing captain (5–8 win–loss record)	
Richa Ghosh	Hobart Hurricanes	→	–		
Eve Jones	–	→	Melbourne Renegades	Replacement player; Returning to the Melbourne Renegades	
Alice Capsey	–	→	Melbourne Stars		
Sophie Ecclestone	–	→	Sydney Sixers		
Tammy Beaumont	–	→	Sydney Thunder	Returning to the Sydney Thunder	
Suzie Bates	–	→	Sydney Sixers	Third WBBL team (previously played for the Perth Scorchers and Adelaide Strikers)	
Lauren Winfield-Hill	–	→	Melbourne Stars	Fourth WBBL team (previously played for the Brisbane Heat, Hobart Hurricanes and Adelaide Strikers)	
Chloe Tryon	–	→	Sydney Thunder	Previously played for the Hobart Hurricanes	
Amy Jones	–	→	Sydney Thunder	Third WBBL team (previously played for the Sydney Sixers and Perth Scorchers)	
Hayley Jensen	–	→	Hobart Hurricanes	Replacement player; Returning to the Hobart Hurricanes	
Jess Kerr	–	→	Brisbane Heat	Replacement player	
Lea Tahuhu	–	→	Sydney Thunder	Previously played for the Melbourne Renegades; Replacement player	
Maia Bouchier	Melbourne Stars	→	–		
Linsey Smith	Melbourne Stars	→	–		
Shafali Verma	Sydney Sixers	→	–		
Radha Yadav	Sydney Sixers	→	–		
Smriti Mandhana	Sydney Thunder	→	–		
Deepti Sharma	Sydney Thunder	→	–		
Bess Heath	–	→	Melbourne Stars	Replacement player	

==== Leadership ====
Coaching changes made ahead of the season included:

- Jonathan Batty was appointed head coach of the Melbourne Stars, replacing Jarrad Loughman.
- Charlotte Edwards was appointed head coach of the Sydney Sixers, replacing Ben Sawyer.
- Dan Marsh was appointed head coach the Hobart Hurricanes, replacing Salliann Beams.

Captaincy changes made ahead of the season included:

- Elyse Villani was appointed captain of the Hobart Hurricanes, replacing Rachel Priest (5–8 win–loss record).
- Nicole Faltum was appointed captain of the Melbourne Stars, replacing Meg Lanning (27–25 win–loss record).

Captaincy changes made during the season included:

- Hayley Matthews stood in as acting captain of the Melbourne Renegades for two games, after Sophie Molineux sustained a knee injury.
- Megan Schutt stood in as acting captain of the Adelaide Strikers for two games while Tahlia McGrath was rested with a back complaint.

== Media coverage ==
Seven Network were once again scheduled to broadcast 24 matches on free-to-air television, which will be simulcast on Foxtel. The remaining 35 matches will be broadcast by Foxtel, and will also be streamed live on cricket.com.au. All 59 matches will be available to watch live and on-demand via Kayo Sports.

== Standings ==
=== Points table ===
Pos	Team	Pld	W	L	NR	Pts	NRR
1	Sydney Sixers (RU)	14	11	2	1	23	0.695
2	Adelaide Strikers (C)	14	8	5	1	17	0.390
3	Brisbane Heat (CF)	14	8	5	1	17	0.276
4	Hobart Hurricanes (EF)	14	7	6	1	15	0.457
5	Perth Scorchers	14	6	7	1	13	0.373
6	Melbourne Stars	14	5	6	3	13	−0.339
7	Melbourne Renegades	14	4	9	1	9	−1.042
8	Sydney Thunder	14	1	10	3	5	−1.000

Source: cricket.com.au, ESPN Cricinfo
- The top 4 teams advanced to the play-off phase

=== Win–loss table ===
Below is a summary of results for each team's fourteen regular season matches, plus finals where applicable, in chronological order. A team's opponent for any given match is listed above the margin of victory/defeat.

Team	1	2	3	4	5	6	7	8	9	10	11	12	13	14	EF	CF	F	Pos.
Adelaide; Strikers (ADS)	SYS; 17 runs	MLR; 4 wkts	SYS; 3 runs	MLR; 8 wkts	BRH; 31 runs	PRS; 6 wkts	MLS; 22 runs	MLS; 5 wkts	PRS; 7 wkts	HBH; 23 runs	SYT; N/R	BRH; 2 runs	HBH; 8 wkts	SYT; 26 runs	→	BRH; 6 wkts	SYS; 10 runs	2nd (C)
Brisbane; Heat (BRH)	SYS; 4 wkts	MLS; 9 runs	MLR; 21 runs	MLR; 26 runs	SYT; 3 runs	ADS; 31 runs	PRS; 3 runs	SYT; 14 runs	HBH; 4 wkts	PRS; 33 runs	HBH; 6 wkts	ADS; 2 runs	SYS; 5 wkts	MLS; N/R	HBH; 44 runs	ADS; 6 wkts	X	3rd (CF)
Hobart; Hurricanes (HBH)	SYT; 19 runs	PRS; 8 wkts	SYT; 49 runs	PRS; N/R	SYS; 8 wkts	MLR; 4 wkts	BRH; 4 wkts	MLR; 8 wkts	ADS; 23 runs	BRH; 6 wkts	MLS; 4 wkts	MLS; 38 runs	ADS; 8 wkts	SYS; 8 wkts	BRH; 44 runs	X	X	4th (EF)
Melbourne; Renegades (MLR)	ADS; 4 wkts	BRH; 21 runs	BRH; 26 runs	ADS; 8 wkts	MLS; 6 wkts	SYS; 37 runs	HBH; 4 wkts	SYT; 5 wkts	HBH; 8 wkts	SYS; N/R	PRS; 104 runs	MLS; 5 wkts	SYT; 8 wkts	PRS; 6 wkts	X	X	X	7th
Melbourne; Stars (MLS)	BRH; 9 runs	SYS; 27 runs	PRS; 2 wkts	SYT; N/R	MLR; 6 wkts	SYT; N/R	ADS; 22 runs	ADS; 5 wkts	SYS; 45 runs	MLR; 5 wkts	HBH; 4 wkts	HBH; 38 runs	PRS; 6 runs	BRH; N/R	X	X	X	6th
Perth; Scorchers (PRS)	SYT; 9 wkts	HBH; 8 wkts	MLS; 2 wkts	SYT; 25 runs	HBH; N/R	ADS; 6 wkts	BRH; 3 runs	SYS; 9 wkts	ADS; 7 wkts	BRH; 33 runs	MLR; 104 runs	SYS; 6 wkts	MLS; 6 runs	MLR; 6 wkts	X	X	X	5th
Sydney; Sixers (SYS)	BRH; 4 wkts	ADS; 17 runs	MLS; 27 runs	ADS; 3 runs	HBH; 8 wkts	MLR; 37 runs	SYT; 15 runs	PRS; 9 wkts	MLR; N/R	MLS; 45 runs	PRS; 6 wkts	BRH; 5 wkts	SYT; 18 runs	HBH; 8 wkts	→	→	ADS; 10 runs	1st (RU)
Sydney; Thunder (SYT)	HBH; 19 runs	PRS; 9 wkts	HBH; 49 runs	PRS; 25 runs	MLS; N/R	BRH; 3 runs	MLS; N/R	SYS; 15 runs	BRH; 14 runs	MLR; 5 wkts	ADS; N/R	MLR; 8 wkts	SYS; 18 runs	ADS; 26 runs	X	X	X	8th

Team's results→	Won	Tied	Lost	N/R

== Fixtures ==
As per all previous seasons, WBBL|08 will consist of a 56-match double round-robin, followed by a finals series featuring the top four qualifiers.

=== Week 1 ===
Match 1
13 October 2022
19:40 (N)
Scorecard

Brisbane Heat; 8/141 (20 overs)	v	Sydney Sixers; 6/143 (19.5 overs)
Georgia Redmayne 49 (39); Maitlan Brown 3/20 (3 overs)		Ellyse Perry 55 (48); Jess Kerr 2/17 (4 overs)

Sydney Sixers won by 4 wickets (with 1 ball remaining)
Great Barrier Reef Arena, Mackay
Umpires: Claire Polosak and Nathan James
Player of the match: Ellyse Perry (Sydney Sixers)

- Sydney Sixers won the toss and elected to field.
- Broadcast by Seven Network and Foxtel

Match 2
14 October 2022
15:00
Scorecard

Hobart Hurricanes; 5/125 (20 overs)	v	Sydney Thunder; 9/106 (20 overs)
Mignon du Preez 33 (27); Chloe Tryon 2/14 (3 overs)		Tahlia Wilson 26 (30); Heather Graham 3/15 (4 overs)

Hobart Hurricanes won by 19 runs
Blacktown ISP Oval, Sydney
Umpires: Andrew Hamilton and Roberto Howard
Player of the match: Heather Graham (Hobart Hurricanes)

- Sydney Thunder won the toss and elected to field.
- Broadcast by cricket.com.au and Foxtel

Match 3
15 October 2022
15:40
Scorecard

Sydney Sixers; 2/151 (20 overs)	v	Adelaide Strikers; 9/134 (20 overs)
Suzie Bates 82* (67); Darcie Brown 1/20 (4 overs)		Katie Mack 34 (32); Sophie Ecclestone 4/17 (4 overs)

Sydney Sixers won by 17 runs
Great Barrier Reef Arena, Mackay
Umpires: Claire Polosak and Nathan James
Player of the match: Suzie Bates (Sydney Sixers)

- Sydney Sixers won the toss and elected to bat.
- Broadcast by Seven Network and Foxtel

Match 4
15 October 2022
19:05 (N)
Scorecard

Brisbane Heat; 3/179 (20 overs)	v	Melbourne Stars; 8/170 (20 overs)
Ellie Johnston 54 (34); Alice Capsey 1/19 (2 overs); Sophie Day 1/19 (2 overs)		Lauren Winfield-Hill 74 (51); Jess Jonassen 3/36 (4 overs)

Brisbane Heat won by 9 runs
Great Barrier Reef Arena, Mackay
Umpires: Claire Polosak and Michael Mellifont
Player of the match: Ellie Johnston (Brisbane Heat)

- Brisbane Heat won the toss and elected to bat.
- Broadcast by Seven Network and Foxtel

Match 5
16 October 2022
10:15
Scorecard

Adelaide Strikers; 7/126 (20 overs)	v	Melbourne Renegades; 6/128 (19.5 overs)
Madeline Penna 36 (43); Sophie Molineux 4/23 (4 overs)		Sophie Molineux 32 (35); Megan Schutt 2/23 (4 overs)

Melbourne Renegades won by 4 wickets (with 1 ball remaining)
Great Barrier Reef Arena, Mackay
Umpires: David Taylor and Nathan James
Player of the match: Sophie Molineux (Melbourne Renegades)

- Melbourne Renegades won the toss and elected to field.
- Broadcast by Seven Network and Foxtel

Match 6
16 October 2022
13:40
Scorecard

Sydney Sixers; 6/147 (20 overs)	v	Melbourne Stars; 9/120 (20 overs)
Alyssa Healy 43 (32); Kim Garth 2/21 (4 overs)		Bess Heath 37 (30); Maitlan Brown 3/25 (4 overs)

Sydney Sixers won by 27 runs
Great Barrier Reef Arena, Mackay
Umpires: Michael Mellifont and Sue Redfern
Player of the match: Ashleigh Gardner (Sydney Sixers)

- Melbourne Stars won the toss and elected to field.
- Broadcast by Seven Network and Foxtel

Match 7
16 October 2022
17:00 (D/N)
Scorecard

Sydney Thunder; 8/88 (20 overs)	v	Perth Scorchers; 1/89 (14.5 overs)
Tahlia Wilson 28 (35); Lilly Mills 2/12 (4 overs)		Sophie Devine 44* (42); Chloe Tryon 1/8 (1 over)

Perth Scorchers won by 9 wickets (with 31 balls remaining)
Blacktown ISP Oval, Sydney
Umpires: Daniel Moran and Roberto Howard
Player of the match: Sophie Devine (Perth Scorchers)

- Sydney Thunder won the toss and elected to bat.
- Broadcast by cricket.com.au and Foxtel

Match 8
17 October 2022
19:05 (N)
Scorecard

Hobart Hurricanes; 9/109 (20 overs)	v	Perth Scorchers; 2/110 (14.1 overs)
Heather Graham 35 (28); Taneale Peschel 3/13 (4 overs)		Beth Mooney 38* (36); Ruth Johnston 1/13 (2 overs)

Perth Scorchers won by 8 wickets (with 35 balls remaining)
Blacktown ISP Oval, Sydney
Umpires: Andrew Hamilton and Roberto Howard
Player of the match: Maddy Green (Perth Scorchers)

- Perth Scorchers won the toss and elected to field.
- Broadcast by cricket.com.au and Foxtel

Match 9
18 October 2022
15:30
Scorecard

Brisbane Heat; 1/180 (20 overs)	v	Melbourne Renegades; 6/159 (20 overs)
Georgia Redmayne 98* (67); Shabnim Ismail 1/31 (4 overs)		Hayley Matthews 35 (19); Amelia Kerr 2/27 (4 overs)

Brisbane Heat won by 21 runs
Great Barrier Reef Arena, Mackay
Umpires: Michael Mellifont and Nathan James
Player of the match: Georgia Redmayne (Brisbane Heat)

- Melbourne Renegades won the toss and elected to field.
- Broadcast by cricket.com.au and Foxtel

Match 10
18 October 2022
19:05 (N)
Scorecard

Hobart Hurricanes; 7/144 (20 overs)	v	Sydney Thunder; 95 (18.1 overs)
Lizelle Lee 41 (29); Sammy-Jo Johnson 3/34 (4 overs)		Phoebe Litchfield 28 (21); Heather Graham 2/13 (3.1 overs)

Hobart Hurricanes won by 49 runs
Blacktown ISP Oval, Sydney
Umpires: Andrew Hamilton and Daniel Moran
Player of the match: Lizelle Lee (Hobart Hurricanes)

- Sydney Thunder won the toss and elected to field.
- Broadcast by cricket.com.au and Foxtel

=== Week 2 ===
Match 11
20 October 2022
20:10 (D/N)
Scorecard

Melbourne Stars; 9/110 (20 overs)	v	Perth Scorchers; 8/111 (19.4 overs)
Tess Flintoff 40* (29); Piepa Cleary 2/8 (2 overs)		Beth Mooney 35 (44); Annabel Sutherland 2/20 (3 overs)

Perth Scorchers won by 2 wickets (with 2 balls remaining)
WACA Ground, Perth
Umpires: Stephen Dionysius and Trent Steenholdt
Player of the match: Beth Mooney (Perth Scorchers)

- Perth Scorchers won the toss and elected to field.
- Broadcast by Seven Network and Foxtel

Match 12
21 October 2022
12:00
Scorecard

Brisbane Heat; 8/163 (20 overs)	v	Melbourne Renegades; 137 (19 overs)
Georgia Voll 52 (37); Shabnim Ismail 1/23 (4 overs)		Courtney Webb 47* (40); Charli Knott 3/19 (4 overs)

Brisbane Heat won by 26 runs
Karen Rolton Oval, Adelaide
Umpires: Harsimran Singh and James Cushway
Player of the match: Georgia Voll (Brisbane Heat)

- Melbourne Renegades won the toss and elected to field.
- Broadcast by cricket.com.au and Foxtel

Match 13
21 October 2022
15:25
Scorecard

Adelaide Strikers; 6/142 (20 overs)	v	Sydney Sixers; 8/139 (20 overs)
Madeline Penna 39* (25); Sophie Ecclestone 2/15 (4 overs)		Erin Burns 71 (38); Darcie Brown 3/17 (4 overs)

Adelaide Strikers won by 3 runs
Karen Rolton Oval, Adelaide
Umpires: Harsimran Singh and Kurt Miegel
Player of the match: Erin Burns (Sydney Sixers)

- Sydney Sixers won the toss and elected to field.
- Broadcast by cricket.com.au and Foxtel
- Ellyse Perry (Sydney Sixers) became the first player to captain 100 WBBL games.

Match 14
22 October 2022
14:30
Scorecard

Sydney Thunder; 4/166 (20 overs)	v	Perth Scorchers; 9/141 (20 overs)
Tammy Beaumont 77* (59); Alana King 1/22 (2 overs)		Marizanne Kapp 32 (23); Lauren Smith 5/17 (4 overs)

Sydney Thunder won by 25 runs
WACA Ground, Perth
Umpires: Ashlee Gibbons and Jarryd Buscall
Player of the match: Lauren Smith (Sydney Thunder)

- Perth Scorchers won the toss and elected to field.
- Broadcast by cricket.com.au and Foxtel

Match 15
23 October 2022
13:40
Scorecard

Sydney Thunder; 1/102 (13.4 overs)	v	Melbourne Stars
Phoebe Litchfield 50* (34)

No result
WACA Ground, Perth
Umpires: Jamie Thomas and Sue Redfern

- Melbourne Stars won the toss and elected to field.
- Broadcast by Seven Network and Foxtel
- Match reduced to 17 overs due to rain.
- No further play was possible due to rain.

Match 16
23 October 2022
17:15
Scorecard

Perth Scorchers	v	Hobart Hurricanes

No result (abandoned with a toss)
WACA Ground, Perth
Umpires: Ashlee Gibbons and Sue Redfern

- Hobart Hurricanes won the toss and elected to field.
- Broadcast by Seven Network and Foxtel
- No play was possible due to rain.

Match 17
24 October 2022
15:30
Scorecard

Melbourne Renegades; 101 (19.5 overs)	v	Adelaide Strikers; 2/102 (17 overs)
Carly Leeson 35 (33); Amanda-Jade Wellington 5/8 (3.5 overs)		Deandra Dottin 55* (55); Sarah Coyte 2/19 (3 overs)

Adelaide Strikers won by 8 wickets (with 18 balls remaining)
Karen Rolton Oval, Adelaide
Umpires: Dhaval Bhatt and Eloise Sheridan
Player of the match: Amanda-Jade Wellington (Adelaide Strikers)

- Adelaide Strikers won the toss and elected to field.
- Broadcast by cricket.com.au and Foxtel
- Amanda-Jade Wellington (Adelaide Strikers) equalled the WBBL record for best bowling figures in an innings.

=== Week 3 ===
Match 18
25 October 2022
18:15 (D/N)
Scorecard

Sydney Thunder; 7/139 (20 overs)	v	Brisbane Heat; 5/120 (17.2 overs)
Phoebe Litchfield 50 (38); Jess Jonassen 2/20 (4 overs)		Georgia Redmayne 33 (36); Lea Tahuhu 3/31 (4 overs)

Brisbane Heat won by 3 runs (DLS method)
Allan Border Field, Brisbane
Umpires: Benjamin Farrell and Tom Logan
Player of the match: Amelia Kerr (Brisbane Heat)

- Sydney Thunder won the toss and elected to bat.
- Brisbane Heat innings curtailed at 17.2 overs due to rain; DLS par score was 117.
- Broadcast by cricket.com.au and Foxtel

Match 19
27 October 2022
19:10 (N)
Scorecard

Adelaide Strikers; 8/140 (20 overs)	v	Brisbane Heat; 109 (16.4 overs)
Laura Wolvaardt 46 (40); Jess Jonassen 3/17 (4 overs)		Charli Knott 29 (29); Megan Schutt 4/11 (3.4 overs)

Adelaide Strikers won by 31 runs
Allan Border Field, Brisbane
Umpires: Joshua Adie and Sharad Patel
Player of the match: Darcie Brown (Adelaide Strikers)

- Brisbane Heat won the toss and elected to field.
- Broadcast by Seven Network and Foxtel

Match 20
28 October 2022
15:15
Scorecard

Perth Scorchers; 5/111 (20 overs)	v	Adelaide Strikers; 4/112 (18.3 overs)
Beth Mooney 34 (34); Amanda-Jade Wellington 2/13 (4 overs)		Katie Mack 47* (51); Lilly Mills 3/17 (3 overs)

Adelaide Strikers won by 6 wickets (with 9 balls remaining)
Allan Border Field, Brisbane
Umpires: Benjamin Farrell and Tom Logan
Player of the match: Katie Mack (Adelaide Strikers)

- Perth Scorchers won the toss and elected to bat.
- Broadcast by cricket.com.au and Foxtel

Match 21
29 October 2022
10:15
Scorecard

Hobart Hurricanes; 8/95 (12 overs)	v	Sydney Sixers; 2/96 (10.5 overs)
Mignon du Preez 26 (19); Ashleigh Gardner 4/23 (3 overs)		Ashleigh Gardner 43 (22); Molly Strano 1/16 (3 overs)

Sydney Sixers won by 8 wickets (with 7 balls remaining)
Eastern Oval, Ballarat
Umpires: Chris Grant and Greg Azzopardi
Player of the match: Ashleigh Gardner (Sydney Sixers)

- Sydney Sixers won the toss and elected to field.
- Match reduced to 12 overs per side due to rain.
- Broadcast by cricket.com.au and Foxtel

Match 22
29 October 2022
14:00
Scorecard

Melbourne Renegades; 91 (19 overs)	v	Melbourne Stars; 4/92 (17.3 overs)
Hayley Matthews 24 (24); Sophie Day 4/19 (4 overs)		Annabel Sutherland 42* (48); Shabnim Ismail 1/15 (4 overs)

Melbourne Stars won by 6 wickets (with 15 balls remaining)
Eastern Oval, Ballarat
Umpires: Lisa McCabe and Mattis van Eck
Player of the match: Annabel Sutherland (Melbourne Stars)

- Melbourne Stars won the toss and elected to field.
- Broadcast by cricket.com.au and Foxtel

Match 23
29 October 2022
19:10 (N)
Scorecard

Perth Scorchers; 7/140 (20 overs)	v	Brisbane Heat; 7/137 (20 overs)
Amy Edgar 36* (26); Jess Jonassen 3/22 (4 overs)		Danni Wyatt 34 (29); Lilly Mills 2/19 (2 overs)

Perth Scorchers won by 3 runs
Allan Border Field, Brisbane
Umpires: Eloise Sheridan and Nathan Jones
Player of the match: Amy Edgar (Perth Scorchers)

- Perth Scorchers won the toss and elected to bat.
- Broadcast by Seven Network and Foxtel

Match 24
30 October 2022
15:00
Scorecard

Sydney Sixers; 3/188 (20 overs)	v	Melbourne Renegades; 9/151 (20 overs)
Alyssa Healy 78 (54); Sophie Molineux 2/38 (4 overs)		Carly Leeson 52 (32); Maitlan Brown 3/16 (4 overs)

Sydney Sixers won by 37 runs
Eastern Oval, Ballarat
Umpires: Daryl Brigham and Gaurav Bawa
Player of the match: Alyssa Healy (Sydney Sixers)

- Melbourne Renegades won the toss and elected to field.
- Broadcast by cricket.com.au and Foxtel

Match 25
31 October 2022
15:00
Scorecard

Sydney Thunder; 2/79 (13.5 overs)	v	Melbourne Stars
Amy Jones 38 (35); Annabel Sutherland 1/7 (1.5 overs)

No result
Eastern Oval, Ballarat
Umpires: Daryl Brigham and Gaurav Bawa

- Melbourne Stars won the toss and elected to field.
- No further play was possible due to rain.
- Broadcast by cricket.com.au and Foxtel

Match 26
2 November 2022
15:30
Scorecard

Melbourne Stars; 5/186 (20 overs)	v	Adelaide Strikers; 8/164 (20 overs)
Tess Flintoff 51* (16); Deandra Dottin 2/34 (4 overs)		Katie Mack 47 (38); Sasha Moloney 4/24 (4 overs)

Melbourne Stars won by 22 runs
North Sydney Oval, Sydney
Umpires: Bede Sajowitz and Daniel Moran
Player of the match: Tess Flintoff (Melbourne Stars)

- Adelaide Strikers won the toss and elected to field.
- Broadcast by cricket.com.au and Foxtel
- Venue changed from Blacktown ISP Oval to North Sydney Oval
- Tess Flintoff (Melbourne Stars) set a new WBBL record for the fastest half-century (16 balls).

Match 27
2 November 2022
19:05 (N)
Scorecard

Sydney Sixers; 6/163 (20 overs)	v	Sydney Thunder; 7/148 (20 overs)
Ashleigh Gardner 53 (37); Lauren Smith 2/22 (3 overs)		Rachael Haynes 37 (29); Lauren Cheatle 3/21 (4 overs)

Sydney Sixers won by 15 runs
North Sydney Oval, Sydney
Umpires: Andrew Hamilton and Roberto Howard
Player of the match: Ashleigh Gardner (Sydney Sixers)

- Sydney Sixers won the toss and elected to bat.
- Broadcast by cricket.com.au and Foxtel
- Venue changed from Blacktown ISP Oval to North Sydney Oval

=== Week 4 ===
Match 28
3 November 2022
19:10 (N)
Scorecard

Melbourne Renegades; 5/133 (20 overs)	v	Hobart Hurricanes; 6/137 (18.1 overs)
Chamari Athapaththu 75* (59); Maisy Gibson 4/24 (4 overs)		Heather Graham 39* (26); Sophie Molineux 2/31 (3.1 overs)

Hobart Hurricanes won by 4 wickets (with 11 balls remaining)
Blundstone Arena, Hobart
Umpires: Muhammad Qureshi and Troy Penman
Player of the match: Maisy Gibson (Hobart Hurricanes)

- Hobart Hurricanes won the toss and elected to field.
- Broadcast by Seven Network and Foxtel

Match 29
4 November 2022
15:30
Scorecard

Brisbane Heat; 3/163 (20 overs)	v	Sydney Thunder; 9/149 (20 overs)
Grace Harris 74 (54); Belinda Vakarewa 3/21 (4 overs)		Sammy-Jo Johnson 41 (41); Jess Jonassen 3/20 (4 overs)

Brisbane Heat won by 14 runs
Blundstone Arena, Hobart
Umpires: Jeremiah Matibiri and Simon Burns
Player of the match: Grace Harris (Brisbane Heat)

- Brisbane Heat won the toss and elected to bat.
- Broadcast by cricket.com.au and Foxtel

Match 30
5 November 2022
13:00
Scorecard

Melbourne Stars; 8/112 (20 overs)	v	Adelaide Strikers; 5/113 (19.1 overs)
Annabel Sutherland 47 (41); Amanda-Jade Wellington 3/20 (4 overs)		Madeline Penna 56* (50); Annabel Sutherland 2/19 (4 overs)

Adelaide Strikers won by 5 wickets (with 5 balls remaining)
Lilac Hill Park, Perth
Umpires: Ashlee Gibbons and Jarryd Buscall
Player of the match: Madeline Penna (Adelaide Strikers)

- Adelaide Strikers won the toss and elected to field
- Broadcast by cricket.com.au and Foxtel

Match 31
5 November 2022
16:25
Scorecard

Sydney Sixers; 5/155 (20 overs)	v	Perth Scorchers; 1/158 (18.3 overs)
Ellyse Perry 69* (58); Alana King 3/27 (4 overs)		Beth Mooney 99* (58); Ashleigh Gardner 1/19 (4 overs)

Perth Scorchers won by 9 wickets (with 9 balls remaining)
Lilac Hill Park, Perth
Umpires: Jamie Thomas and Trent Steenholdt
Player of the match: Beth Mooney (Perth Scorchers)

- Sydney Sixers won the toss and elected to bat.
- Broadcast by cricket.com.au and Foxtel

Match 32
6 November 2022
10:15
Scorecard

Hobart Hurricanes; 7/164 (20 overs)	v	Brisbane Heat; 6/168 (19.4 overs)
Mignon du Preez 73* (54); Nicola Hancock 4/32 (4 overs)		Laura Harris 68* (29); Molly Strano 2/17 (4 overs)

Brisbane Heat won by 4 wickets (with 2 balls remaining)
Blundstone Arena, Hobart
Umpires: Eloise Sheridan and Jeremiah Matibiri
Player of the match: Laura Harris (Brisbane Heat)

- Brisbane Heat won the toss and elected to field.
- Broadcast by Seven Network and Foxtel

Match 33
6 November 2022
13:40
Scorecard

Sydney Thunder; 6/121 (20 overs)	v	Melbourne Renegades; 5/122 (18 overs)
Amy Jones 53 (48); Ella Hayward 2/14 (4 overs)		Sophie Molineux 55* (45); Hannah Darlington 2/22 (3 overs)

Melbourne Renegades won by 5 wickets (with 12 balls remaining)
Blundstone Arena, Hobart
Umpires: Eloise Sheridan and Muhammad Qureshi
Player of the match: Sophie Molineux (Melbourne Renegades)

- Sydney Thunder won the toss and elected to bat.
- Broadcast by Seven Network and Foxtel

Match 34
6 November 2022
16:50
Scorecard

Perth Scorchers; 9/119 (20 overs)	v	Adelaide Strikers; 3/120 (16 overs)
Sophie Devine 37 (33); Megan Schutt 4/20 (4 overs)		Deandra Dottin 68 (51); Piepa Cleary 2/29 (3 overs)

Adelaide Strikers won by 7 wickets (with 24 balls remaining)
Lilac Hill Park, Perth
Umpires: Jarryd Buscall and Trent Steenholdt
Player of the match: Megan Schutt (Adelaide Strikers)

- Perth Scorchers won the toss and elected to bat.
- Broadcast by cricket.com.au and Foxtel

Match 35
7 November 2022
19:10 (N)
Scorecard

Melbourne Renegades; 80 (17.2 overs)	v	Hobart Hurricanes; 2/82 (10.4 overs)
Courtney Webb 30 (36); Molly Strano 4/16 (4 overs)		Elyse Villani 41* (34); Sophie Molineux 2/20 (3 overs)

Hobart Hurricanes won by 8 wickets (with 56 balls remaining)
Blundstone Arena, Hobart
Umpires: Greg Beechey and Jeremiah Matibiri
Player of the match: Molly Strano (Hobart Hurricanes)

- Hobart Hurricanes won the toss and elected to field.
- Broadcast by cricket.com.au and Foxtel

Match 36
9 November 2022
15:00
Scorecard

Brisbane Heat; 7/153 (20 overs)	v	Perth Scorchers; 8/120 (20 overs)
Georgia Redmayne 28* (27); Alana King 2/24 (4 overs)		Maddy Green 58 (53); Nicola Hancock 3/26 (4 overs)

Brisbane Heat won by 33 runs
Lilac Hill Park, Perth
Umpires: Ashlee Gibbons and Jamie Thomas
Player of the match: Amelia Kerr (Brisbane Heat)

- Perth Scorchers won the toss and elected to field.
- Broadcast by cricket.com.au and Foxtel

=== Week 5 ===
Match 37
10 November 2022
15:00
Scorecard

Melbourne Renegades; 1/64 (11 overs)	v	Sydney Sixers
Hayley Matthews 40 (41); Ashleigh Gardner 1/21 (3 overs)

No result
CitiPower Centre, Melbourne
Umpires: Chris Grant and Greg Azzopardi

- Sydney Sixers won the toss and elected to field.
- No further play was possible due to rain.
- Broadcast by cricket.com.au and Foxtel

Match 38
11 November 2022
18:00 (D/N)
Scorecard

Hobart Hurricanes; 4/152 (20 overs)	v	Adelaide Strikers; 4/129 (20 overs)
Heather Graham 50 (34); Amanda-Jade Wellington 2/31 (4 overs)		Laura Wolvaardt 45 (38); Molly Strano 2/21 (4 overs)

Hobart Hurricanes won by 23 runs
Karen Rolton Oval, Adelaide
Umpires: Eloise Sheridan and Harsimran Singh
Player of the match: Heather Graham (Hobart Hurricanes)

- Adelaide Strikers won the toss and elected to field.
- Broadcast by cricket.com.au and Foxtel

Match 39
12 November 2022
10:15
Scorecard

Perth Scorchers; 4/192 (20 overs)	v	Melbourne Renegades; 88 (17.3 overs)
Beth Mooney 90 (58); Georgia Prestwidge 1/37 (4 overs)		Erica Kershaw 25 (22); Piepa Cleary 2/6 (2 overs)

Perth Scorchers won by 104 runs
CitiPower Centre, Melbourne
Umpires: Mattis van Eck and Stephen Dionysius
Player of the match: Beth Mooney (Perth Scorchers)

- Melbourne Renegades won the toss and elected to field.
- Broadcast by Seven Network and Foxtel
- Perth Scorchers set a new WBBL record for greatest winning margin (by runs).

Match 40
12 November 2022
13:40
Scorecard

Sydney Sixers; 9/160 (20 overs)	v	Melbourne Stars; 115 (19.2 overs)
Alyssa Healy 31 (28); Kim Garth 2/9 (3 overs)		Kim Garth 18 (21); Ashleigh Gardner 4/27 (4 overs)

Sydney Sixers won by 45 runs
CitiPower Centre, Melbourne
Umpires: Lisa McCabe and Stephen Dionysius
Player of the match: Ashleigh Gardner (Sydney Sixers)

- Melbourne Stars won the toss and elected to field.
- Broadcast by Seven Network and Foxtel

Match 41
12 November 2022
18:00 (D/N)
Scorecard

Brisbane Heat; 6/100 (13 overs)	v	Hobart Hurricanes; 4/101 (12.3 overs)
Grace Harris 41 (30); Hayley Jensen 1/9 (2 overs)		Mignon du Preez 37 (29); Nicola Hancock 2/20 (2 overs)

Hobart Hurricanes won by 6 wickets (with 3 balls remaining)
Karen Rolton Oval, Adelaide
Umpires: Dhaval Bhatt and Eloise Sheridan
Player of the match: Mignon du Preez (Hobart Hurricanes)

- Hobart Hurricanes won the toss and elected to field.
- Match reduced to 13 overs per side due to rain.
- Broadcast by cricket.com.au and Foxtel

Match 42
13 November 2022
10:15
Scorecard

Perth Scorchers; 4/176 (20 overs)	v	Sydney Sixers; 4/180 (20 overs)
Beth Mooney 75* (51); Ashleigh Gardner 2/30 (4 overs)		Alyssa Healy 107* (64); Sophie Devine 2/29 (4 overs)

Sydney Sixers won by 6 wickets (with 0 balls remaining)
CitiPower Centre, Melbourne
Umpires: Daryl Brigham and David Taylor
Player of the match: Alyssa Healy (Sydney Sixers)

- Sydney Sixers won the toss and elected to field.
- Broadcast by Seven Network and Foxtel

Match 43
13 November 2022
13:40
Scorecard

Melbourne Renegades; 8/148 (20 overs)	v	Melbourne Stars; 5/149 (20 overs)
Josie Dooley 54 (46); Sasha Moloney 4/15 (4 overs)		Annabel Sutherland 62* (29); Sarah Coyte 3/22 (4 overs)

Melbourne Stars won by 5 wickets (with 0 balls remaining)
CitiPower Centre, Melbourne
Umpires: Chris Grant and David Taylor
Player of the match: Annabel Sutherland (Melbourne Stars)

- Melbourne Stars won the toss and elected to field.
- Broadcast by Seven Network and Foxtel

In the 15th meeting between the two Melbourne teams—the first to take place in their home city since 30 November 2019—the Renegades lost three early wickets before Josie Dooley and Courtney Webb formed a 50-run partnership from 39 balls. Sarah Coyte hit two sixes off the bowling of Kim Garth in the 20th over, helping to set a target of 149 for victory.

The Stars began the run chase sluggishly, and failed to capitalise on several controversial umpiring decisions in their favour. Alice Capsey survived a close stumping chance but was ultimately dismissed for just eleven, while the Decision Review System overturned an LBW call for Garth who would nevertheless fall to the bowling of Coyte in the following over. Earlier in the innings, Coyte became the eighth player in WBBL history to claim 100 career wickets.

Annabel Sutherland breathed life into the contest as the Stars scored 22 runs from the 14th over against the previously economical Ella Hayward. The Renegades created several opportunities to effectively close out the match but put down key catching chances, which included an error in the field by Shabnim Ismail off her own bowling.

Needing an unlikely 23 runs from six balls to win, Sutherland promptly launched two sixes to dramatically shift the game's momentum. While delivering the third ball of the final over, Renegades captain Sophie Molineux suffered a knee injury which forced her from the field. Georgia Prestwidge was subsequently given the task of finishing the over, having not bowled throughout the innings up to that point. Sutherland proceeded to hit another six, and Stars captain Nicole Faltum then scored one run off the last delivery of the match to clinch her team's sixth win against their crosstown rivals.

Match 44
13 November 2022
15:00
Scorecard

Adelaide Strikers; 3/92 (14.3 overs)	v	Sydney Thunder
Katie Mack 29 (28); Samantha Bates 1/10 (2.3 overs)

No result
Centennial Park Oval, Nuriootpa
Umpires: Dhaval Bhatt and Kurt Miegel

- Sydney Thunder won the toss and elected to field.
- No further play was possible due to rain.
- Broadcast by cricket.com.au and Foxtel

Match 45
14 November 2022
18:00 (D/N)
Scorecard

Brisbane Heat; 6/114 (16 overs)	v	Adelaide Strikers; 115 (16 overs)
Amelia Kerr 32 (28); Megan Schutt 3/38 (4 overs)		Laura Wolvaardt 45 (38); Amelia Kerr 3/26 (4 overs)

Brisbane Heat won by 2 runs (DLS method)
Karen Rolton Oval, Adelaide
Umpires: Dhaval Bhatt and Harsimran Singh
Player of the match: Amelia Kerr (Brisbane Heat)

- Brisbane Heat won the toss and elected to bat.
- Match reduced to 16 overs per side due to rain.
- Adelaide Strikers were set a revised target of 118 runs.
- Broadcast by cricket.com.au and Foxtel

=== Week 6 ===
Match 46
15 November 2022
15:00
Scorecard

Hobart Hurricanes; 8/130 (20 overs)	v	Melbourne Stars; 6/132 (19.1 overs)
Nicola Carey 31 (33); Annabel Sutherland 3/18 (4 overs)		Alice Capsey 80* (52); Molly Strano 3/17 (4 overs)

Melbourne Stars won by 4 wickets (with 5 balls remaining)
Latrobe Recreation Ground, Latrobe
Umpires: Craig Seabourne and Muhammad Qureshi
Player of the match: Alice Capsey (Melbourne Stars)

- Melbourne Stars won the toss and elected to field.
- Broadcast by cricket.com.au and Foxtel

Match 47
15 November 2022
19:10 (N)
Scorecard

Sydney Thunder; 95 (20 overs)	v	Melbourne Renegades; 2/98 (14.2 overs)
Tahlia Wilson 20 (27); Georgia Prestwidge 3/22 (4 overs)		Hayley Matthews 46* (40); Lauren Smith 1/12 (3 overs)

Melbourne Renegades won by 8 wickets (with 34 balls remaining)
Manuka Oval, Canberra
Umpires: Andrew Crozier and Dinusha Bandara
Player of the match: Georgia Prestwidge (Melbourne Renegades)

- Melbourne Renegades won the toss and elected to field.
- Broadcast by cricket.com.au and Foxtel

Match 48
16 November 2022
15:00
Scorecard

Hobart Hurricanes; 7/152 (20 overs)	v	Melbourne Stars; 6/114 (20 overs)
Mignon du Preez 50* (48); Alice Capsey 2/14 (3 overs)		Alice Capsey 38 (26); Hayley Jensen 2/24 (3 overs)

Hobart Hurricanes won by 38 runs
Latrobe Recreation Ground, Latrobe
Umpires: Craig Seabourne and Muhammad Qureshi
Player of the match: Mignon du Preez (Hobart Hurricanes)

- Melbourne Stars won the toss and elected to field.
- Broadcast by cricket.com.au and Foxtel

Match 49
16 November 2022
19:10 (N)
Scorecard

Brisbane Heat; 5/163 (20 overs)	v	Sydney Sixers; 5/164 (19.3 overs)
Jess Jonassen 38* (21); Kate Peterson 4/17 (4 overs)		Erin Burns 51* (32); Jess Kerr 1/29 (4 overs)

Sydney Sixers won by 5 wickets (with 3 balls remaining)
North Sydney Oval, Sydney
Umpires: Andrew Hamilton and Bede Sajowitz
Player of the match: Erin Burns (Sydney Sixers)

- Sydney Sixers won the toss and elected to field.
- Broadcast by cricket.com.au and Foxtel

Match 50
18 November 2022
15:40
Scorecard

Hobart Hurricanes; 154 (19.4 overs)	v	Adelaide Strikers; 2/155 (14.5 overs)
Mignon du Preez 75 (47); Jemma Barsby 3/27 (4 overs)		Tahlia McGrath 93* (51); Nicola Carey 1/11 (2 overs)

Adelaide Strikers won by 8 wickets (with 31 balls remaining)
North Sydney Oval, Sydney
Umpires: Andrew Hamilton and Troy Penman
Player of the match: Tahlia McGrath (Adelaide Strikers)

- Adelaide Strikers won the toss and elected to field.
- Broadcast by Seven Network and Foxtel

Match 51
18 November 2022
19:05 (N)
Scorecard

Sydney Sixers; 6/178 (20 overs)	v	Sydney Thunder; 7/160 (20 overs)
Ashleigh Gardner 85 (48); Samantha Bates 3/21 (4 overs)		Tammy Beaumont 51 (32); Kate Peterson 3/27 (4 overs)

Sydney Sixers won by 18 runs
North Sydney Oval, Sydney
Umpires: Claire Polosak and Roberto Howard
Player of the match: Ashleigh Gardner (Sydney Sixers)

- Sydney Thunder won the toss and elected to field.
- Broadcast by Seven Network and Foxtel

Match 52
19 November 2022
10:40
Scorecard

Melbourne Stars; 8/179 (20 overs)	v	Perth Scorchers; 7/173 (20 overs)
Lauren Winfield-Hill 36 (25); Amy Edgar 3/27 (4 overs)		Chloe Piparo 34 (27); Alice Capsey 3/37 (4 overs)

Melbourne Stars won by 6 runs
Ted Summerton Reserve, Moe
Umpires: Lisa McCabe and Mattis van Eck
Player of the match: Sasha Moloney (Melbourne Stars)

- Perth Scorchers won the toss and elected to field.
- Broadcast by cricket.com.au and Foxtel

Match 53
20 November 2022
10:15
Scorecard

Perth Scorchers; 2/46 (8 overs)	v	Melbourne Renegades; 4/58 (7.3 overs)
Sophie Devine 24* (22); Shabnim Ismail 1/12 (2 overs)		Erica Kershaw 34* (18); Lilly Mills 3/9 (2 overs)

Melbourne Renegades won by 6 wickets (with 3 balls remaining) (DLS method)
Ted Summerton Reserve, Moe
Umpires: Daryl Brigham and Lisa McCabe
Player of the match: Erica Kershaw (Melbourne Renegades)

- Melbourne Renegades won the toss and elected to field.
- Match reduced to 8 overs per side due to rain.
- Melbourne Renegades were set a revised target of 57 runs.
- Broadcast by cricket.com.au and Foxtel

Match 54
20 November 2022
13:40
Scorecard

Hobart Hurricanes; 156 (19.5 overs)	v	Sydney Sixers; 2/157 (18.5 overs)
Mignon du Preez 38 (29); Kate Peterson 3/31 (4 overs)		Ellyse Perry 56* (39); Ruth Johnston 1/30 (3.5 overs)

Sydney Sixers won by 8 wickets (with 7 balls remaining)
North Sydney Oval, Sydney
Umpires: Bede Sajowitz and Sharad Patel
Player of the match: Ellyse Perry (Sydney Sixers)

- Sydney Sixers won the toss and elected to field.
- Broadcast by Seven Network and Foxtel

Match 55
20 November 2022
14:00
Scorecard

Brisbane Heat; 4/105 (10 overs)	v	Melbourne Stars; 1/49 (3.5 overs)
Danni Wyatt 52 (24); Sasha Moloney 2/12 (2 overs)		Lauren Winfield-Hill 22* (13); Amelia Kerr 1/4 (0.5 overs)

No result
Ted Summerton Reserve, Moe
Umpires: Chris Grant and Mattis van Eck

- Melbourne Stars won the toss and elected to field.
- Match reduced to 10 overs per side due to rain.
- No further play was possible due to rain.
- Broadcast by cricket.com.au and Foxtel

Match 56
20 November 2022
17:15 (D/N)
Scorecard

Adelaide Strikers; 4/144 (20 overs)	v	Sydney Thunder; 118 (19.3 overs)
Laura Wolvaardt 75* (56); Hannah Darlington 2/36 (4 overs)		Tammy Beaumont 37 (27); Megan Schutt 6/19 (3.3 overs)

Adelaide Strikers won by 26 runs
North Sydney Oval, Sydney
Umpires: Roberto Howard and Sharad Patel
Player of the match: Megan Schutt (Adelaide Strikers)

- Sydney Thunder won the toss and elected to field.
- Broadcast by Seven Network and Foxtel
- Megan Schutt (Adelaide Strikers) set a new WBBL record for best bowling figures in an innings.
- Former Australian player Rachael Haynes (Sydney Thunder) made her last WBBL appearance.

== Knockout phase ==
Eliminator
3	Brisbane Heat	7/179
4	Hobart Hurricanes	9/135

Challenger
2	Adelaide Strikers	4/156
3	Brisbane Heat	8/154

Final
1	Sydney Sixers	137
2	Adelaide Strikers	5/147

=== Eliminator ===
23 November 2022
19:10 (N)

Brisbane Heat; 7/179 (20 overs)	v	Hobart Hurricanes; 9/135 (20 overs)
Danni Wyatt 52 (38); Amy Smith 3/21 (4 overs)		Lizelle Lee 47 (42); Jess Jonassen 4/23 (4 overs)

Brisbane Heat won by 44 runs
Karen Rolton Oval, Adelaide
Umpires: Claire Polosak and Stephen Dionysius
Player of the match: Laura Harris (Brisbane Heat)

- Hobart Hurricanes won the toss and elected to field.
- Broadcast by Seven Network and Foxtel

=== Challenger ===
24 November 2022
19:10 (N)
Scorecard

Brisbane Heat; 8/154 (20 overs)	v	Adelaide Strikers; 4/156 (19.4 overs)
Amelia Kerr 43 (32); Megan Schutt 3/26 (4 overs)		Laura Wolvaardt 47 (45); Charli Knott 1/27 (3 overs)

Adelaide Strikers won by 6 wickets (with 2 balls remaining)
Karen Rolton Oval, Adelaide
Umpires: Troy Penman and Eloise Sheridan
Player of the match: Bridget Patterson (Adelaide Strikers)

- Brisbane Heat won the toss and elected to bat.
- Broadcast by Seven Network and Foxtel

=== Final ===
==== Background ====
The Sydney Sixers reached their fifth WBBL Final, having appeared in each of the league's first four championship deciders. They became the second team in the competition's history (following the Melbourne Stars in WBBL|06) to reach the Final after finishing the previous season in last place. WBBL|08 Sixers squad members Erin Burns, Lauren Cheatle, Ashleigh Gardner, Alyssa Healy and Ellyse Perry were all part of the team's title-winning campaign in WBBL|03. Gardner, Healy and Perry were also part of the team's title-winning campaign in WBBL|02.

The Adelaide Strikers reached their second-consecutive WBBL Final, and third in four seasons. Suzie Bates, overseas marquee player for the Sydney Sixers in WBBL|08, was the captain of the Strikers in WBBL|05 when they were defeated in the championship decider by the Brisbane Heat. Jemma Barsby and Laura Wolvaardt are the only WBBL|08 Strikers squad members to have previously been part of a title-winning campaign, having played for the Heat when they defeated the Sixers in the WBBL|04 Final.

The Sixers and Strikers had never previously met in a championship decider. The only prior meeting in the knockout phase occurred during WBBL|03, when the Sixers recorded a 17-run semi-final defeat of the Strikers. The WBBL|08 Final would be the 18th overall encounter between the two teams, with the Sixers holding a 12–5 head-to-head edge. It would be the second Final held at North Sydney Oval, following the WBBL|06 Final between the Melbourne Stars and Sydney Thunder, making it the first venue to host multiple championship deciders.

Although the Sydney Sixers and Adelaide Strikers had never met in a WBBL Final before, several players from both sides were involved in the 2015–16 WNCL final between New South Wales (Cheatle, Healy and Perry) and South Australia (Tahlia McGrath, Tegan McPharlin, Bridget Patterson, Megan Schutt and Amanda-Jade Wellington). The match, which South Australia won by 54 runs, was notable for marking the end of New South Wales' ten-year championship streak in the national 50-over competition.

==== Match summary ====
26 November 2022
17:20 (D/N)
Scorecard

Adelaide Strikers; 5/147 (20 overs)	v	Sydney Sixers; 137 (20 overs)
Deandra Dottin 52* (37); Sophie Ecclestone 2/19 (4 overs)		Maitlan Brown 34 (17); Darcie Brown 2/15 (4 overs)

Adelaide Strikers won by 10 runs
North Sydney Oval, Sydney
Attendance: 6,478
Umpires: Claire Polosak and Eloise Sheridan
Player of the match: Deandra Dottin (Adelaide Strikers)

- Adelaide Strikers won the toss and elected to bat.
- Broadcast by Seven Network and Foxtel
- Former Australian player Nicole Bolton (Sydney Sixers) made her last WBBL appearance.
- Adelaide Strikers won their first WBBL title.

Laura Wolvaardt and Katie Mack put on a 51-run first-wicket stand for the Strikers, though both players were then removed within the space of six balls. Mack (31 off 26) became just the second batter in WBBL history (following Suzie Bates in WBBL|02) to be dismissed hit wicket. Deandra Dottin survived two close calls in the ninth over off the bowling of Kate Peterson—first a catch put down by Nicole Bolton at point, then a catch taken from a waist-high no ball. The next over Dottin was caught again, but this time she was granted a reprieve due to Ellyse Perry committing a front-foot no ball.

Scoring slowed notably between the 13th and 17th overs of the innings, and the trio of McGrath, Patterson and Madeline Penna all fell in that period. The Sixers were made to pay for their earlier missed opportunities when Dottin launched a six off Gardner in the 18th over, then hit a four and another six off the last two balls of the Peterson-delivered 19th over. Having set the favourites a target of 148 for victory, general consensus among commentators was the Strikers had been restricted to a below-par total.

The run chase began after an unusual twelve-minute delay, caused by a complaint from Sixers batter Suzie Bates about the setting sun impairing her vision. The Strikers quickly claimed ascendancy in the contest, as the hosts found themselves down 4/16 in the sixth over. Nicole Bolton (32 off 27) and Perry (33 off 32) helped their team recover via a 60-run partnership, though each batter would be bowled by McGrath and Darcie Brown in the 14th and 15th over respectively.

Sophie Ecclestone and Maitlan Brown combined to clear the rope four times late in the innings, while the Strikers made several errors in the field which kept the door ajar. Nevertheless, wickets continued to fall, and the task became too much for the Sixers after Ecclestone was deceived by a Megan Schutt slower ball. Facing Amanda-Jade Wellington's leg spin, Maitlan Brown hit the last delivery of the match in the air to long-on, which Wolvaardt successfully juggled and consequently sealed a ten-run victory for the Strikers.

==== Post-match ====
Barbadian marquee Deandra Dottin became the third-consecutive overseas signing to be named Player of the Match in a WBBL Final. The Strikers became the fifth team to win a WBBL title, leaving the Hobart Hurricanes, Melbourne Renegades and Melbourne Stars as the three remaining teams yet to claim a championship. Wicket-keeper Tegan McPharlin retired from cricket at the conclusion of the match, having played 109 WBBL matches for the Strikers and 86 WNCL matches for South Australia.

Adding insult to injury for the losing team, the Sixers were deemed to be one over behind the over rate for the match, which triggered an automatic one-game suspension for captain Ellyse Perry (to be served at the beginning of WBBL|09).

== Statistics ==
=== Highest totals ===
Team	Score	Against	Venue	Date
Perth Scorchers	4/192 (20 overs)	Melbourne Renegades	CitiPower Centre	12 November 2022
Sydney Sixers	3/188 (20 overs)	Melbourne Renegades	Eastern Oval	30 October 2022
Melbourne Stars	5/186 (20 overs)	Adelaide Strikers	North Sydney Oval	2 November 2022
Brisbane Heat	1/180 (20 overs)	Melbourne Renegades	Great Barrier Reef Arena	18 October 2022
Sydney Sixers	4/180 (20 overs)	Perth Scorchers	CitiPower Centre	13 November 2022

Source: CricInfo

=== Most runs ===
Player	Team	Runs
Beth Mooney	Perth Scorchers	434
Ellyse Perry	Sydney Sixers	408
Laura Wolvaardt	Adelaide Strikers	403
Mignon du Preez	Hobart Hurricanes	380
Deandra Dottin	Adelaide Strikers	362

- Source: CricInfo

=== Most wickets ===
Player	Team	Wickets
Megan Schutt	Adelaide Strikers	27
Jess Jonassen	Brisbane Heat	25
Amanda-Jade Wellington	Adelaide Strikers	23
Ashleigh Gardner	Sydney Sixers	23
Nicola Hancock	Brisbane Heat	22

- Source: CricInfo

== Awards ==
=== Player of the tournament ===
Player of the Tournament votes are awarded on a 3-2-1 basis by the two standing umpires at the conclusion of every match, meaning a player can receive a maximum of six votes per game.

Pos.	Player	Team	Votes
1st	Ashleigh Gardner	Sydney Sixers	33
2nd	Amelia Kerr	Brisbane Heat	25
=3rd	Beth Mooney	Perth Scorchers	21
=3rd	Megan Schutt	Adelaide Strikers	21
5th	Ellyse Perry	Sydney Sixers	20
=6th	Heather Graham	Hobart Hurricanes	18
=6th	Alyssa Healy	Sydney Sixers	18
=6th	Mignon du Preez	Hobart Hurricanes	18
=9th	Annabel Sutherland	Melbourne Stars	16
=9th	Hayley Matthews	Melbourne Renegades	16

=== Team of the tournament ===
The selection panel for the Team of the Tournament was made up of the head coaches of the eight WBBL clubs.

- Beth Mooney (Perth Scorchers)
- Georgia Redmayne (Brisbane Heat) – wicket-keeper
- Alyssa Healy (Sydney Sixers)
- Ashleigh Gardner (Sydney Sixers)
- Annabel Sutherland (Melbourne Stars)
- Erin Burns (Sydney Sixers)
- Amelia Kerr (Brisbane Heat)
- Jess Jonassen (Brisbane Heat) – captain
- Amanda-Jade Wellington (Adelaide Strikers)
- Nicola Hancock (Brisbane Heat)
- Megan Schutt (Adelaide Strikers)
- Molly Strano (Hobart Hurricanes) – 12th

=== Young gun award ===
Players under 21 years of age at the start of the season were eligible for the Young Gun Award. The winner was chosen by national selector Shawn Flegler.

Melbourne Stars all-rounder Tess Flintoff was named the Young Gun for WBBL|08, having scored 116 runs at an average of 23.20 and a strike rate of 165.71, and claimed four wickets during the season.

=== Most valuable players ===
Each team designated an award to adjudge and recognise their most outstanding contributor for the season.

- Adelaide Strikers: Megan Schutt
- Brisbane Heat: Amelia Kerr
- Melbourne Renegades: Sophie Molineux
- Melbourne Stars: Annabel Sutherland
- Perth Scorchers: Marizanne Kapp
- Sydney Sixers: Ashleigh Gardner
- Sydney Thunder: Phoebe Litchfield

== See also ==
- 2022–23 Big Bash League season
