= Paris Bowdler =

Australian cricketer

Personal information
- Full name: Paris Bowdler
- Born: 24 November 2004 (age 21)
- Batting: Right-handed
- Role: Wicket-keeper

Domestic team information
- Years: Team
- 2022/23: Melbourne Renegades
- 2023/24–present: Australian Capital Territory

Career statistics
Competition	WLA	WT20
Matches	27	10
Runs scored	460	64
Batting average	17.69	9.14
100s/50s	0/1	0/0
Top score	61	19
Catches/stumpings	7/1	1/0
- Source: CricketArchive, 18 March 2026

Paris Bowdler (born 24 November 2004) is an Australian cricketer who currently plays for Australian Capital Territory. She plays as a wicket-keeper and right-handed batter. She has previously played for Melbourne Renegades.

== Domestic career ==
In October 2022, Bowdler was called up to the Melbourne Renegades squad in the Women's Big Bash League as a replacement for injured wicket-keeper Josie Dooley. She had already impressed the Renegades set-up by reaching the final of Renegades Recruit earlier in 2022, a program that aimed to uncover upcoming cricket talent in Victoria. She made her debut for the side on 30 October 2022, against Sydney Sixers, in which she kept wicket and scored 2*.

== International career ==
In December 2022, Bowdler was selected in the Australia Under-19 squad for the 2023 ICC Under-19 Women's T20 World Cup. She went on to play two matches at the tournament.
