= Tess Flintoff =

Australian cricketer

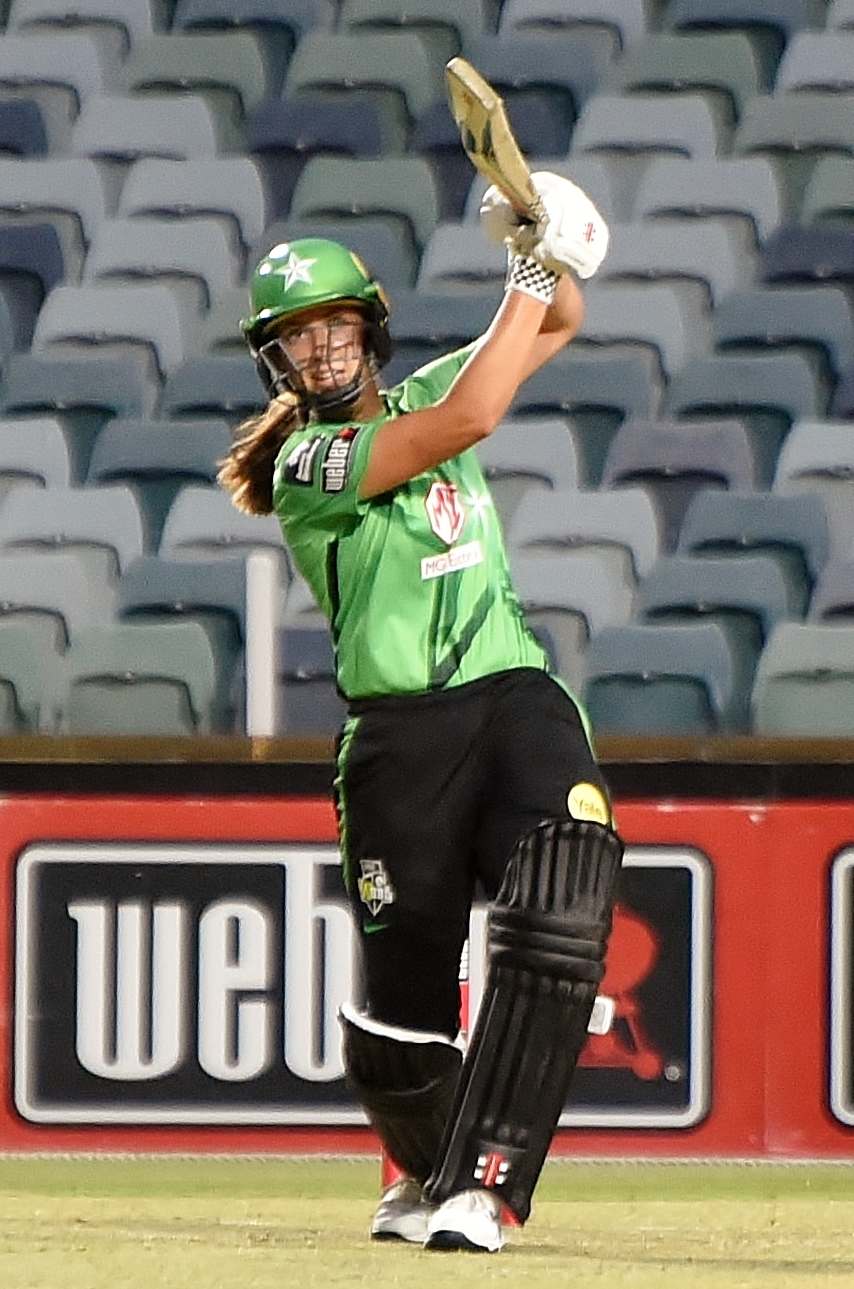
- Flintoff batting for Melbourne Stars in October 2022

Personal information
- Full name: Tess Flintoff
- Born: 31 March 2003 (age 23); Melbourne, Victoria, Australia
- Batting: Right-handed
- Bowling: Right-arm medium
- Role: All-rounder

Domestic team information
- Years: Team
- 2019/20–present: Victoria
- 2019/20–present: Melbourne Stars
- 2023–present: Birmingham Phoenix

Career statistics
Competition	WLA	WT20
Matches	67	97
Runs scored	998	670
Batting average	24.34	15.58
100s/50s	0/7	0/2
Top score	80	55
Balls bowled	1,718	1,627
Wickets	33	50
Bowling average	44.66	32.54
5 wickets in innings	0	0
10 wickets in match	0	0
Best bowling	3/32	3/13
Catches/stumpings	15/–	27/–
- Source: CricketArchive, 05 February 2026

Tess Flintoff (born 31 March 2003) is an Australian cricketer who plays for Victoria in the Women's National Cricket League (WNCL) and the Melbourne Stars in the Women's Big Bash League (WBBL). An all-rounder, she bats right-handed and bowls right-arm medium pace. In 2015, Flintoff was named in Cricket Australia's under-15 Talent Squad and in 2020 she was selected to play for Australia's under-19 team for a planned tour to South Africa.

In January 2022, Flintoff was named in Australia's A squad for their series against England A, with the matches being played alongside the Women's Ashes.

During the 2022-23 Women's Big Bash League, she hit a 16-ball fifty against Adelaide Strikers. It is the fastest fifty in Women's Big Bash League and the second-fastest recorded fifty Women's Twenty20 cricket after Marie Kelly's 15-ball fifty earlier in the same year. Her team Melbourne Stars scored 186/5 then, which is their highest total in Women's BBL.
