= Ella Hayward =

Australian cricketer (born 2003)

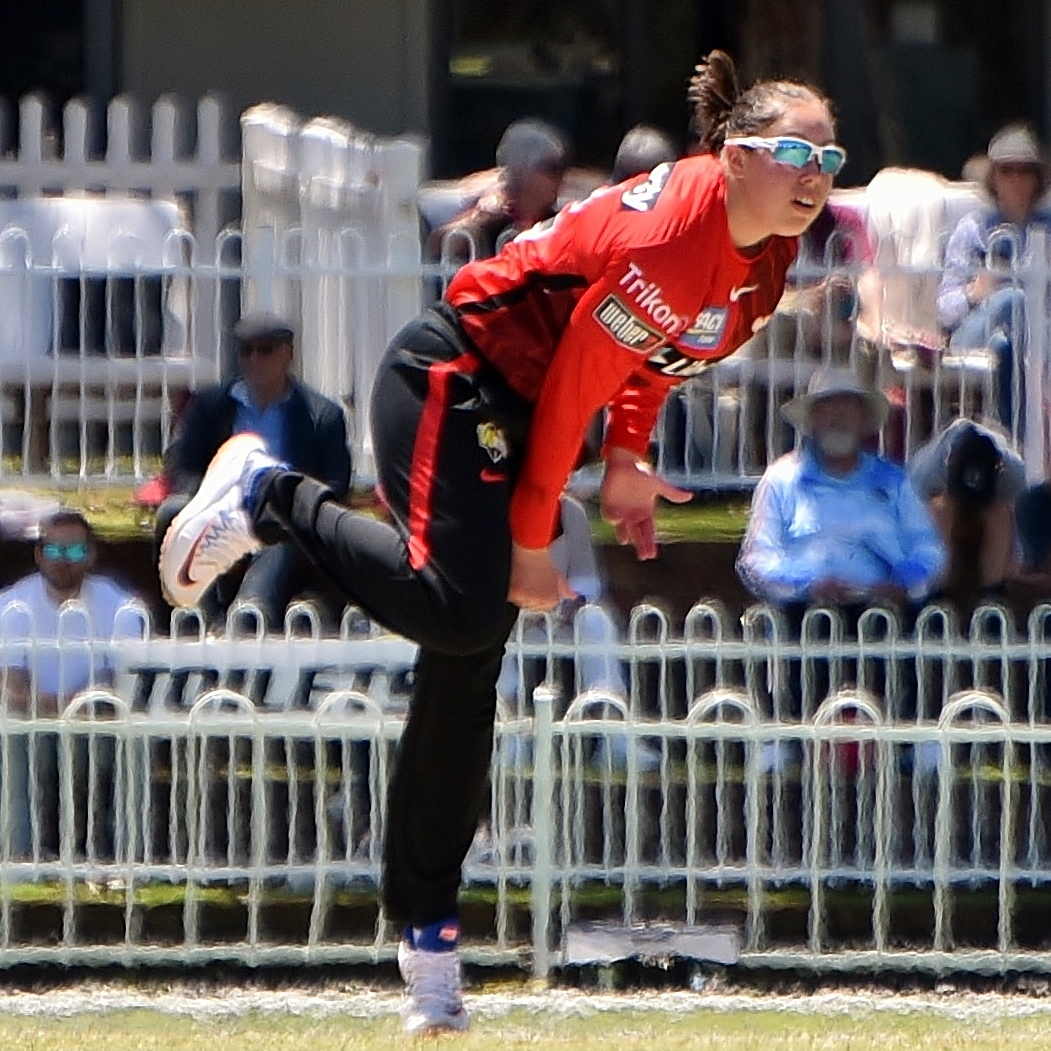
- Hayward bowling for Melbourne Renegades during WBBL|07

Personal information
- Full name: Ella Leigh Hayward
- Born: 8 September 2003 (age 23)
- Batting: Right-handed
- Bowling: Right-arm off break
- Role: All-rounder

Domestic team information
- Years: Team
- 2020/21–present: Melbourne Renegades
- 2020/21–present: Victoria

Career statistics
Competition	WLA	WT20
Matches	29	43
Runs scored	482	133
Batting average	21.00	–
100s/50s	0/1	0/0
Top score	57*	34
Balls bowled	1,010	744
Wickets	22	24
Bowling average	32.95	36.17
5 wickets in innings	0	0
10 wickets in match	0	0
Best bowling	4/21	4/16
Catches/stumpings	1/–	0/–
- Source: CricketArchive, 1 April 2021

Ella Leigh Hayward (born 8 September 2003) is an Australian cricketer who plays for the Hobart Hurricanes in the Women's Big Bash League (WBBL) and Tasmania in the Women's National Cricket League (WNCL). She played in eight matches for the Renegades in the 2020–21 Women's Big Bash League season. She made her Victoria debut on 18 March 2021, scoring four runs and bowling three overs for 19.

== International career ==
In December 2022, Hayward was selected in the Australia Under-19 squad for the 2023 ICC Under-19 Women's T20 World Cup.
