= Karen Rolton Oval =

Cricket ground in Adelaide, Australia

- Park 25
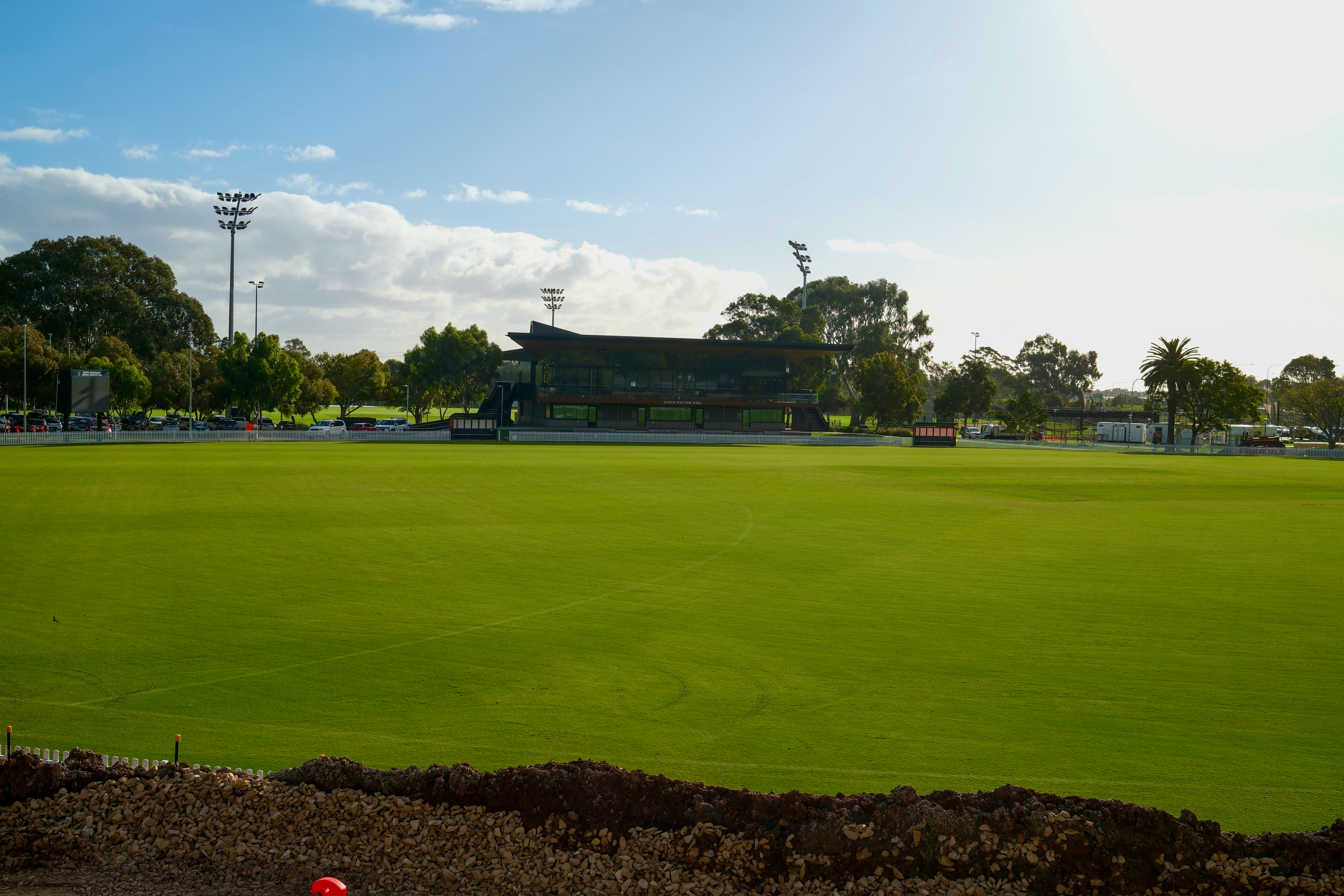
- The oval in 2026
- Interactive map of Karen Rolton Oval

Ground information
- Location: Adelaide, South Australia
- Country: Australia
- Coordinates: 34°55′21″S 138°35′07″E
- Establishment: 2018 (redevelopment)
- Capacity: 5,000

International information
- Only women's ODI: 24 February 2019: Australia v New Zealand
- As of 16 February 2025; Source: Cricinfo

Karen Rolton Oval is a cricket ground in Adelaide, South Australia, named after the Australian former cricketer Karen Rolton. It is located near the corner of West Terrace and Port Road, opposite the new Royal Adelaide Hospital, in the eastern end of Park 25 of the Adelaide Park Lands.

The Port Adelaide Football Club looked into buying the ground in 2014, although this was blocked by the SACA in 2015.

The venue hosted the Women's One Day International (WODI) match between Australia and New Zealand on 24 February 2019. It hosted its first first-class match from 20 to 23 March 2019, when South Australia played Victoria in the final round of the 2018-19 Sheffield Shield season.

The venue hosted the 2024–25 Sheffield Shield final between South Australia and Queensland, which saw South Australia win their first Sheffield Shield title in 29 years. South Australia fans stormed the field in celebration after Jason Sangha hit the winning runs.

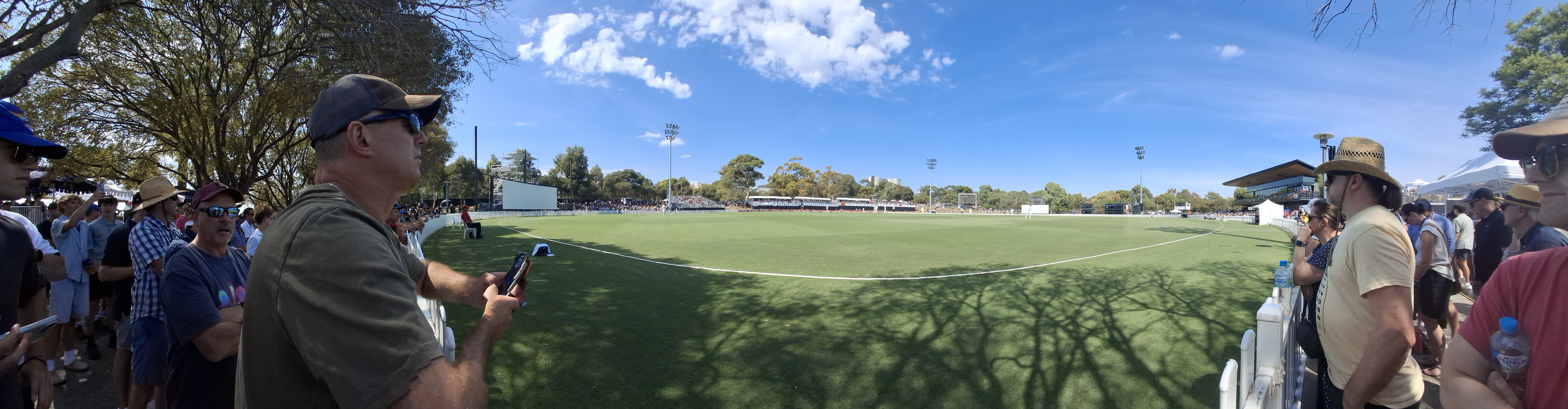
Karen Rolton Oval during Day 4 of the 2025 Sheffield Shield Final.
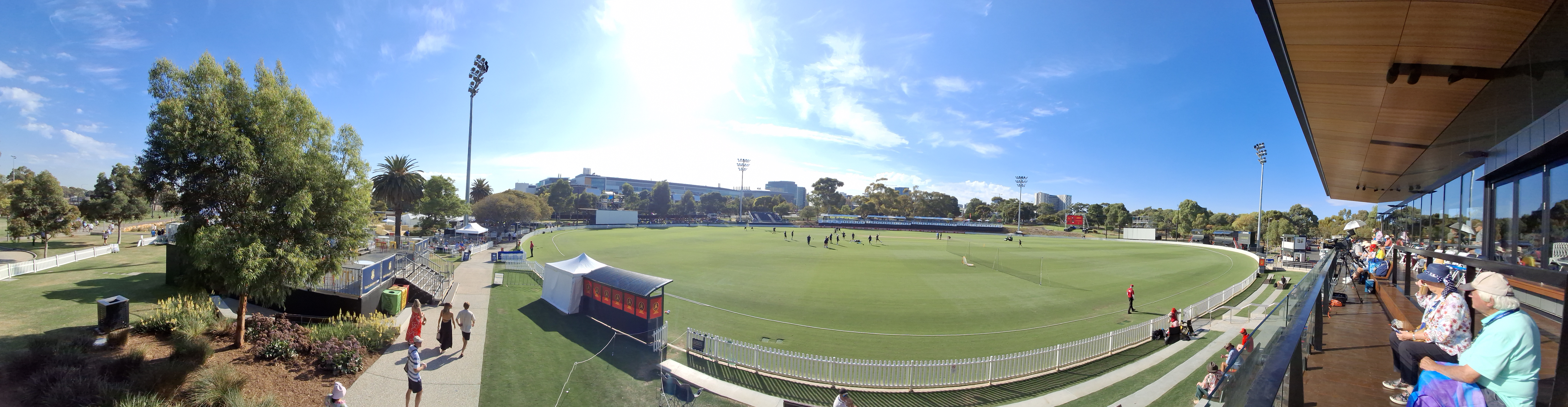
The view from the grandstand.

== See also ==
- List of cricket grounds in Australia
