= 2021–22 Perth Scorchers WBBL season =

Women's Big Bash season

Perth Scorchers
2021–22 season
- Perth Scorchers 2021–22 cap logo
- Coach: Shelley Nitschke
- Captain(s): Sophie Devine
- Home ground: WACA Ground
- League: WBBL
- Record: 9–3 (1st)
- Finals: Champions
- Leading Run Scorer: Beth Mooney – 547
- Leading Wicket Taker: Heather Graham – 18
- Player of the Season: Sophie Devine

The 2021–22 Perth Scorchers Women's season was the seventh in the team's history. Coached by Shelley Nitschke and captained by Sophie Devine, the Scorchers finished the regular season of WBBL|07 on top of the ladder to claim their first minor premiership. They hosted the championship decider at Perth Stadium on 27 November 2021, defeating the Adelaide Strikers by 12 runs to win a maiden WBBL title. Marizanne Kapp was named Player of the Final for her influential all-round performance, scoring 31* off 23 deliveries and producing bowling figures of 1/25 from four overs. For the second consecutive season, batter Beth Mooney was the league's leading run-scorer.

== Squad ==
Each 2021–22 squad was made up of 15 active players. Teams could sign up to five 'marquee players', with a maximum of three of those from overseas. Marquees were defined as any overseas player, or a local player who holds a Cricket Australia national contract at the start of the WBBL|07 signing period.

Personnel changes made ahead of the season included:

- English marquees Amy Jones and Sarah Glenn did not re-sign with the Scorchers in anticipation of a clashing schedule with national team duties.
- South African marquee Marizanne Kapp signed with the Scorchers, departing the Sydney Sixers.
- Sri Lankan marquee Chamari Athapaththu signed with the Scorchers, having previously played for the Melbourne Renegades.
- Nicole Bolton departed the Scorchers, signing with the Sydney Sixers.
- Alana King signed with the Scorchers, departing the Melbourne Stars.
- Jemma Barsby departed the Scorchers, signing with the Adelaide Strikers.
- Emma King departed the Scorchers, retiring from cricket after WBBL|06.
- Lisa Griffith signed with the Scorchers, departing the Sydney Sixers and having previously played for the Sydney Thunder.
- Lilly Mills signed with the Scorchers, departing the Brisbane Heat.
- Ashley Day signed with the Scorchers, having previously played for the Hobart Hurricanes.

The table below lists the Scorchers players and their key stats (including runs scored, batting strike rate, wickets taken, economy rate, catches and stumpings) for the season.

No.	Name	Nat.	Birth Date	Batting style	Bowling style	G	R	SR	W	E	C	S	Notes
Batters
58	Chamari Athapaththu	(Sri Lanka)	9 February 1990	Left-handed	Right-arm off spin	10	182	117.41	0	10.00	5	–	Overseas marquee
5	Mathilda Carmichael	(Australia)	4 April 1994	Right-handed	Right-arm medium	13	60	103.44	–	–	4	–	
64	Ashley Day	(Australia)	17 September 1999	Right-handed	Right-arm leg spin	–	–	–	–	–	–	–	
9	Amy Edgar	(Australia)	27 December 1997	Right-handed	Right-arm medium	1	–	–	–	–	0	–	
28	Chloe Piparo	(Australia)	5 September 1994	Right-handed	Right-arm off spin	14	216	107.46	–	–	6	–	
All-rounders
77	Sophie Devine	(New Zealand)	1 September 1989	Right-handed	Right-arm medium fast	14	442	128.48	10	7.25	3	–	Captain, overseas marquee
11	Heather Graham	(Australia)	10 May 1996	Right-handed	Right-arm medium	14	197	110.05	18	6.38	7	–	
7	Marizanne Kapp	(South Africa)	4 January 1990	Right-handed	Right-arm medium fast	14	106	99.06	12	5.27	5	–	Overseas marquee
Wicket-keeper
10	Beth Mooney	(Australia)	14 January 1994	Left-handed	–	14	547	128.70	–	–	5	2	Australian marquee
Bowlers
14	Samantha Betts	(Australia)	16 February 1996	Right-handed	Right-arm medium fast	4	0	0.00	1	11.50	0	–	
8	Piepa Cleary	(Australia)	17 July 1996	Right-handed	Right-arm medium fast	7	–	–	0	9.25	0	–	
18	Lisa Griffith	(Australia)	28 August 1992	Right-handed	Right-arm medium fast	7	–	–	3	7.07	3	–	
23	Alana King	(Australia)	22 November 1995	Left-handed	Right-arm leg spin	14	85	108.97	16	5.84	8	–	
56	Lilly Mills	(Australia)	2 January 2001	Right-handed	Right-arm off spin	14	6	50.00	16	6.83	4	–	
6	Taneale Peschel	(Australia)	29 August 1994	Right-handed	Right-arm medium fast	14	8	80.00	7	7.02	3	–	

== Ladder ==
Pos	Team	Pld	W	L	NR	Pts	NRR
1	Perth Scorchers (C)	14	9	3	2	20	0.649
2	Melbourne Renegades (CF)	14	8	4	2	18	−0.149
3	Brisbane Heat (EF)	14	8	5	1	17	0.517
4	Adelaide Strikers (RU)	14	7	6	1	15	0.707
5	Melbourne Stars	14	5	7	2	12	−0.385
6	Hobart Hurricanes	14	5	8	1	11	−0.258
7	Sydney Thunder	14	4	8	2	10	−0.301
8	Sydney Sixers	14	4	9	1	9	−0.704

Source: cricket.com.au, ESPN Cricinfo
- The top 4 teams advanced to the play-off phase

== Fixtures ==
All times are local

=== Regular season ===
Match 4
17 October 2021
13:40
Scorecard

Perth Scorchers; 7/137 (20 overs)	v	Brisbane Heat; 9/137 (20 overs)
Beth Mooney 40 (37); Jess Jonassen 3/16 (4 overs)		Grace Harris 41 (27); Lilly Mills 3/28 (4 overs)

Match tied
(Perth Scorchers won the Super Over)
Blundstone Arena, Hobart
Umpires: Claire Polosak and Mattie van Eck
Player of the match: Alana King (Perth Scorchers)

- Brisbane Heat won the toss and elected to field.
- Broadcast by Seven Network and Foxtel
- Start time swapped with Match 5
- Super Over: Brisbane Heat 2/12 (1 over), Perth Scorchers 0/14 (0.4 overs)

Match 7
19 October 2021
16:50 (D/N)
Scorecard

Brisbane Heat; 5/162 (20 overs)	v	Perth Scorchers; 103 (17.2 overs)
Georgia Redmayne 59* (52); Heather Graham 2/15 (4 overs)		Sophie Devine 18 (15); Grace Harris 3/16 (3.2 overs)

Brisbane Heat won by 59 runs
Blundstone Arena, Hobart
Umpires: Andrew Crozier and Jeremiah Matibiri
Player of the match: Georgia Redmayne (Brisbane Heat)

- Perth Scorchers won the toss and elected to field.
- Broadcast by Cricket Network and Foxtel

Match 13
23 October 2021
19:05 (N)
Scorecard

Perth Scorchers	v	Melbourne Renegades

Match abandoned
University of Tasmania Stadium, Launceston
Umpires: Simon Lightbody and Jeremiah Matibiri

- No toss
- No play was possible due to rain.
- Broadcast by Seven Network and Foxtel

Match 16
24 October 2021
17:15 (D/N)
Scorecard

Perth Scorchers; 2/186 (20 overs)	v	Sydney Thunder; 9/105 (20 overs)
Sophie Devine 101 (60); Issy Wong 1/24 (3 overs)		Phoebe Litchfield 24 (34); Alana King 4/11 (4 overs)

Perth Scorchers won by 81 runs
University of Tasmania Stadium, Launceston
Umpires: Andrew Crozier and Simon Lightbody
Player of the match: Sophie Devine (Perth Scorchers)

- Sydney Thunder won the toss and elected to field.
- Broadcast by Seven Network and Foxtel

Match 23
30 October 2021
13:50
Scorecard

Perth Scorchers; 5/121 (20 overs)	v	Adelaide Strikers; 8/121 (20 overs)
Beth Mooney 36 (33); Amanda-Jade Wellington 2/12 (4 overs)		Katie Mack 24 (30); Lilly Mills 2/18 (3 overs)

Match tied
(Perth Scorchers won the Super Over)
Lilac Hill Park, Perth
Umpires: Jarryd Buscall and Nathan Johnstone
Player of the match: Beth Mooney (Perth Scorchers)

- Perth Scorchers won the toss and elected to bat.
- Broadcast by Cricket Network and Foxtel
- Super Over: Adelaide Strikers 2/9 (1 over), Perth Scorchers 0/12 (0.2 overs)

Match 28
31 October 2021
13:50
Scorecard

Sydney Sixers; 3/161 (20 overs)	v	Perth Scorchers; 9/117 (20 overs)
Alyssa Healy 94* (57); Taneale Peschel 2/34 (4 overs)		Beth Mooney 30 (29); Nicole Bolton 3/11 (2 overs)

Sydney Sixers won by 44 runs
Lilac Hill Park, Perth
Umpires: Jarryd Buscall and Trent Steenholdt
Player of the match: Alyssa Healy (Sydney Sixers)

- Sydney Sixers won the toss and elected to bat.
- Broadcast by Cricket Network and Foxtel

Match 30
3 November 2021
13:50
Scorecard

Perth Scorchers; 2/194 (20 overs)	v	Melbourne Renegades; 6/154 (20 overs)
Beth Mooney 101* (63); Harmanpreet Kaur 1/32 (3 overs)		Courtney Webb 46 (34); Lilly Mills 4/25 (3 overs)

Perth Scorchers won by 40 runs
WACA Ground, Perth
Umpires: Jarryd Buscall and Nathan Johnstone
Player of the match: Beth Mooney (Perth Scorchers)

- Perth Scorchers won the toss and elected to bat.
- Broadcast by Cricket Network and Foxtel

Match 33
6 November 2021
13:50
Scorecard

Hobart Hurricanes; 8/137 (20 overs)	v	Perth Scorchers; 8/135 (20 overs)
Rachel Priest 54 (48); Alana King 2/20 (4 overs)		Chamari Atapattu 33 (31); Nicola Carey 2/17 (4 overs)

Hobart Hurricanes won by 2 runs
WACA Ground, Perth
Umpires: Nathan Johnstone and Dean Trigg
Player of the match: Rachel Priest (Hobart Hurricanes)

- Hobart Hurricanes won the toss and elected to bat.
- Broadcast by Cricket Network and Foxtel

Match 36
7 November 2021
13:50
Scorecard

Hobart Hurricanes; 96 (20 overs)	v	Perth Scorchers; 5/99 (15.3 overs)
Ruth Johnston 38 (40); Marizanne Kapp 4/10 (4 overs)		Chloe Piparo 29 (33); Tayla Vlaeminck 3/21 (4 overs)

Perth Scorchers won by 5 wickets (with 27 balls remaining)
WACA Ground, Perth
Umpires: Jarryd Buscall and Trent Steenholdt
Player of the match: Marizanne Kapp (Perth Scorchers)

- Hobart Hurricanes won the toss and elected to bat.
- Broadcast by Cricket Network and Foxtel

Match 39
10 November 2021
12:55
Scorecard

Melbourne Stars; 9/97 (20 overs)	v	Perth Scorchers; 0/98 (10.5 overs)
Kim Garth 31 (31); Sophie Devine 2/11 (3 overs)		Beth Mooney 57* (38)

Perth Scorchers won by 10 wickets (with 55 balls remaining)
Karen Rolton Oval, Adelaide
Umpires: D Bhatt and Simon Lightbody
Player of the match: Sophie Devine (Perth Scorchers)

- Melbourne Stars won the toss and elected to bat.
- Broadcast by Cricket Network and Foxtel

Match 41
11 November 2021
12:55
Scorecard

Perth Scorchers; 2/184 (20 overs)	v	Sydney Thunder; 1/21 (2.3 overs)
Beth Mooney 83* (53); Hannah Darlington 1/32 (4 overs)		Smriti Mandhana 12* (8); Marizanne Kapp 1/8 (1.3 overs)

No result
Karen Rolton Oval, Adelaide
Umpires: D Bhatt and Nathan Johnstone

- Perth Scorchers won the toss and elected to bat.
- No further play was possible due to rain.
- Broadcast by Cricket Network and Foxtel

Match 47
17 November 2021
10:00
Scorecard

Perth Scorchers; 3/177 (20 overs)	v	Adelaide Strikers; 5/165 (20 overs)
Beth Mooney 78 (53); Sarah Coyte 1/27 (3 overs)		Katie Mack 84* (61); Sophie Devine 2/30 (4 overs); Heather Graham 2/30 (4 overs)

Perth Scorchers won by 12 runs
Karen Rolton Oval, Adelaide
Umpires: Harsimran Singh and David Taylor
Player of the match: Beth Mooney (Perth Scorchers)

- Perth Scorchers won the toss and elected to bat.
- Broadcast by Cricket Network and Foxtel
- Start time brought forward from 15:10
- Perth Scorchers qualified for finals.

Match 51
20 November 2021
09:45
Scorecard

Melbourne Stars; 7/122 (20 overs)	v	Perth Scorchers; 6/123 (20 overs)
Elyse Villani 84 (66); Heather Graham 3/16 (4 overs)		Mathilda Carmichael 30 (20); Annabel Sutherland 2/20 (4 overs)

Perth Scorchers won by 4 wickets (with 0 balls remaining)
Adelaide Oval, Adelaide
Umpires: Claire Polosak and Eloise Sheridan
Player of the match: Heather Graham (Perth Scorchers)

- Perth Scorchers won the toss and elected to field.
- Broadcast by Seven Network and Foxtel
- Melbourne Stars were eliminated from finals contention.

Match 55
21 November 2021
09:45
Scorecard

Sydney Sixers; 4/128 (20 overs)	v	Perth Scorchers; 2/131 (17.1 overs)
Ellyse Perry 39* (37); Alana King 3/18 (4 overs)		Chloe Piparo 50* (39); Nicole Bolton 1/20 (3 overs)

Perth Scorchers won by 8 wickets (with 17 balls remaining)
Adelaide Oval, Adelaide
Umpires: Dhaval Bhatt and Simon Lightbody
Player of the match: Alana King (Perth Scorchers)

- Sydney Sixers won the toss and elected to bat.
- Broadcast by Seven Network and Foxtel

=== Final ===
27 November 2021
16:10 (D/N)
Scorecard

Perth Scorchers; 5/146 (20 overs)	v	Adelaide Strikers; 6/134 (20 overs)
Sophie Devine 35 (33); Tahlia McGrath 1/14 (2 overs)		Tahlia McGrath 36 (29); Taneale Peschel 2/23 (4 overs)

Perth Scorchers won by 12 runs
Perth Stadium, Perth
Attendance: 15,511
Umpires: Nathan Johnstone and Simon Lightbody
Player of the match: Marizanne Kapp (Perth Scorchers)

- Adelaide Strikers won the toss and elected to field.
- Broadcast by Seven Network and Foxtel
- The crowd of 15,511 set a new attendance record for a standalone WBBL match.
- Perth Scorchers won their first WBBL title.

== Statistics and awards ==
- Most runs: Beth Mooney – 547 (1st in the league)
- Highest score in an innings: Beth Mooney – 101* vs Melbourne Renegades, 3 November 2021
- Most wickets: Heather Graham – 18 (4th in the league)
- Best bowling figures in an innings: Marizanne Kapp – 4/10 (4 overs) vs Hobart Hurricanes, 7 November 2021
- Most catches (fielder): Alana King – 8 (equal 5th in the league)
- Player of the Match awards:
  - Beth Mooney – 3
  - Sophie Devine, Marizanne Kapp, Alana King – 2 each
  - Heather Graham – 1
- WBBL|07 Player of the Tournament: Sophie Devine (equal 2nd), Beth Mooney (equal 2nd)
- WBBL|07 Team of the Tournament: Sophie Devine (captain), Beth Mooney
- Scorchers Player of the Year: Sophie Devine
