= 2021–22 Women's Big Bash League season =

Cricket tournament

2021–22 Women's Big Bash League
- Dates: 14 October 2021 – 27 November 2021
- Administrator: Cricket Australia
- Cricket format: Twenty20
- Tournament format(s): Double round-robin and knockout finals
- Champions: Perth Scorchers (1st title)
- Runners-up: Adelaide Strikers
- Participants: 8
- Matches: 59
- Player of the series: Harmanpreet Kaur (MLR)
- Most runs: Beth Mooney (PRS) – 547
- Most wickets: Amanda-Jade Wellington (ADS) – 23
- Official website: WBBL

The 2021–22 Women's Big Bash League season or WBBL|07 was the seventh season of the Women's Big Bash League (WBBL), the semi-professional women's Twenty20 domestic cricket competition in Australia. The tournament was played from 14 October to 27 November 2021. The Sydney Thunder entered the season as the defending champions, having won their second title in WBBL|06, but failed to qualify for the knockout stage.

In the championship decider, played at Perth Stadium, the Perth Scorchers defeated the Adelaide Strikers by 12 runs. Marizanne Kapp was named Player of the Final for her influential all-round performance, scoring 31* off 23 deliveries and producing bowling figures of 1/25 from four overs to help the Scorchers claim their maiden WBBL title.

Indian marquee Harmanpreet Kaur was named Player of the Tournament in her first season with the Melbourne Renegades, marking the first time the award was not won by a player from Australia or New Zealand.

== Teams ==
Each squad was made up of 15 active players. Teams could sign up to five 'marquee players', with a maximum of three of those from overseas. Marquees were defined as any overseas player, or a local player who holds a Cricket Australia national contract at the start of the WBBL|07 signing period.

Due to state border restrictions brought about by the COVID-19 pandemic, Cricket Australia announced there would be no WBBL|07 matches played in New South Wales and Victoria. Consequently, half of the league's teams (the Melbourne Renegades, Melbourne Stars, Sydney Sixers and Sydney Thunder) were unable to host home games for the season. Due to renovation works on their regular primary ground at Allan Border Field, the Brisbane Heat played home games in Mackay for the season.

The table below lists each team's marquee players and other key details for the season.

Team	Home ground (Note: Number of games hosted at each venue is indicated in brackets)	Secondary grounds	Coach	Captain	Australian representatives (Note: Only includes players who debuted for Australia before the tournament)	Overseas players
Adelaide Strikers	Karen Rolton Oval (4)	Adelaide Oval (4)	Luke Williams	Tahlia McGrath	Darcie Brown; Tahlia McGrath; Megan Schutt; Sarah Coyte (Note: Player did not hold a Cricket Australia national contract at the beginning of the WBBL|07 signing period); Amanda-Jade Wellington	Dane van Niekerk; Laura Wolvaardt
Brisbane Heat	Harrup Park (4)	–	Ashley Noffke	Jess Jonassen	Jess Jonassen; Grace Harris	Anneke Bosch; Nadine de Klerk; Poonam Yadav
Hobart Hurricanes	Blundstone Arena (3)	UTAS Stadium (4); Invermay Park (1)	Salliann Beams	Rachel Priest	Nicola Carey; Tayla Vlaeminck; Naomi Stalenberg; Molly Strano; Belinda Vakarewa	Mignon du Preez; Richa Ghosh; Rachel Priest
Melbourne Renegades	–	–	Simon Helmot	Sophie Molineux	Sophie Molineux; Georgia Wareham; Jess Duffin; Holly Ferling	Evelyn Jones; Harmanpreet Kaur; Jemimah Rodrigues
Melbourne Stars	–	–	Jarrad Loughman	Meg Lanning	Meg Lanning; Annabel Sutherland; Erin Osborne; Elyse Villani	Maia Bouchier; Kim Garth; Linsey Smith
Perth Scorchers	WACA Ground (3)	Lilac Hill Park (2); Perth Stadium (1)	Shelley Nitschke	Sophie Devine	Beth Mooney; Heather Graham	Chamari Athapaththu; Sophie Devine; Marizanne Kapp
Sydney Sixers	–	–	Ben Sawyer	Ellyse Perry	Ashleigh Gardner; Alyssa Healy; Ellyse Perry; Nicole Bolton; Erin Burns; Stella Campbell; Lauren Cheatle	Shafali Verma; Radha Yadav
Sydney Thunder	–	–	Trevor Griffin	Rachael Haynes (Note: Hannah Darlington was appointed captain in the absence of Haynes.)	Rachael Haynes; Hannah Darlington	Smriti Mandhana; Deepti Sharma; Issy Wong

=== Personnel changes ===
==== Local players ====
The table below lists local player movements made ahead of the season.

Player	Departed	→	Joined	Notes	Ref(s)
Alana King	Melbourne Stars	→	Perth Scorchers		
Molly Strano	Melbourne Renegades	→	Hobart Hurricanes		
Nicole Bolton	Perth Scorchers	→	Sydney Sixers		
Holly Ferling	Melbourne Stars	→	Melbourne Renegades	Third WBBL team (previously played for the Brisbane Heat)	
Corinne Hall	Hobart Hurricanes	→	Sydney Thunder	Outgoing captain (7–27 win–loss record)	
Maitlan Brown	Melbourne Renegades	→	Sydney Sixers		
Rachel Trenaman	Sydney Thunder	→	Hobart Hurricanes	Unavailable for the season due to injury	
Sarah Aley	Sydney Sixers	→	–	Retired	
Delissa Kimmince	Brisbane Heat	→	–	Retired	
Emma King	Perth Scorchers	→	–	Retired	
Ellie Falconer	Adelaide Strikers	→	Melbourne Renegades		
Rhiann O'Donnell	–	→	Melbourne Renegades	Returning to the Melbourne Renegades; Previously played for the Hobart Hurricanes	
Jemma Barsby	Perth Scorchers	→	Adelaide Strikers	Third WBBL team (previously played for the Brisbane Heat)	
Nell Bryson-Smith	Hobart Hurricanes	→	Adelaide Strikers	Replacement player in WBBL|06	
Brooke Hepburn	Hobart Hurricanes	→	–	Retired	
Maddy Darke	Sydney Sixers	→	Melbourne Stars		
Lisa Griffith	Sydney Sixers	→	Perth Scorchers	Third WBBL team (previously played for the Sydney Thunder)	
Lilly Mills	Brisbane Heat	→	Perth Scorchers		
Ashley Day	–	→	Perth Scorchers	Previously played for the Hobart Hurricanes	

==== Overseas players ====
On 26 September 2021, the Sydney Thunder announced the signings of overseas marquees Smriti Mandhana and Deepti Sharma, meaning WBBL|07 would feature Indian players in the league for the first time since the 2018–19 season.

The table below lists changes to overseas player allocations made ahead of the season.

Player	Departed	→	Joined	Notes	Ref(s)
Marizanne Kapp	Sydney Sixers	→	Perth Scorchers		
Chamari Athapaththu	–	→	Perth Scorchers	Previously played for the Melbourne Renegades	
Dane van Niekerk	Sydney Sixers	→	Adelaide Strikers	Third WBBL team (previously played for the Melbourne Renegades)	
Kim Garth	–	→	Melbourne Stars	Previously played for the Sydney Sixers and Perth Scorchers	
Anneke Bosch	–	→	Brisbane Heat		
Mignon du Preez	Melbourne Stars	→	Hobart Hurricanes		
Amelia Kerr	Brisbane Heat	→	–		
Maia Bouchier	–	→	Melbourne Stars		
Evelyn Jones	–	→	Melbourne Renegades		
Lizelle Lee	Melbourne Renegades	→	–	Signed with the Hobart Hurricanes but withdrew from the tournament	
Smriti Mandhana	–	→	Sydney Thunder	Third WBBL team (previously played for the Brisbane Heat and the Hobart Hurricanes)	
Deepti Sharma	–	→	Sydney Thunder		
Heather Knight	Sydney Thunder	→	–		
Tammy Beaumont	Sydney Thunder	→	–		
Shafali Verma	–	→	Sydney Sixers		
Radha Yadav	–	→	Sydney Sixers		
Shabnim Ismail	Sydney Thunder	→	–	Withdrew due to knee injury	
Jemimah Rodrigues	–	→	Melbourne Renegades		
Harmanpreet Kaur	–	→	Melbourne Renegades	Previously played for the Sydney Thunder	
Amy Satterthwaite	Melbourne Renegades	→	–	Outgoing captain (17–23 win–loss record)	
Lea Tahuhu	Melbourne Renegades	→	–		
Suzie Bates	Adelaide Strikers	→	–	Outgoing captain (24–21 win–loss record)	
Richa Ghosh	–	→	Hobart Hurricanes		
Hayley Matthews	Hobart Hurricanes	→	–		
Chloe Tryon	Hobart Hurricanes	→	–		
Issy Wong	–	→	Sydney Thunder		
Katherine Brunt	Melbourne Stars	→	–		
Sarah Glenn	Perth Scorchers	→	–		
Amy Jones	Perth Scorchers	→	–		
Nat Sciver	Melbourne Stars	→	–		
Linsey Smith	–	→	Melbourne Stars		
Stafanie Taylor	Adelaide Strikers	→	–		
Poonam Yadav	–	→	Brisbane Heat		
Maddy Green	Brisbane Heat	→	–		

==== Leadership ====
Coaching changes made ahead of the season included:

- Simon Helmot was appointed head coach of the Melbourne Renegades, replacing Lachlan Stevens.
- Jarrad Loughman was appointed head coach of the Melbourne Stars, replacing Trent Woodhill.
- On 2 July 2021, the Sydney Sixers announced two-time championship coach Ben Sawyer would not return for WBBL|07, having instead taken on a full-time assistant role for the Australian national women's team. However, on 27 July, it was revealed Cricket Australia agreed to allow Sawyer to coach the Sixers for a seventh and final season.

Captaincy changes made ahead of the season included:

- Sophie Molineux was appointed captain of the Melbourne Renegades, replacing Amy Satterthwaite (17–23 win–loss record).
- Rachel Priest was appointed captain of the Hobart Hurricanes, replacing Corinne Hall (7–27 win–loss record).
- After Sydney Thunder captain Rachael Haynes announced she would be unlikely to participate in the season due to family reasons, Hannah Darlington was appointed to stand in as Haynes' replacement.
- Tahlia McGrath was appointed captain of the Adelaide Strikers, replacing Suzie Bates (24–21 win–loss record).

== Media coverage ==
Coverage of the league received a boost from the previous season with subscription channel Fox Cricket broadcasting an additional 23 matches, marking the first time every match would be televised. Seven Network would again broadcast 24 matches on free-to-air television, while the remaining 35 matches were free to stream live on cricket.com.au and the Cricket Australia Live app. All 59 matches were also available to watch live and on-demand via Kayo Sports.

== Standings ==
=== Points table ===
Pos	Team	Pld	W	L	NR	Pts	NRR
1	Perth Scorchers (C)	14	9	3	2	20	0.649
2	Melbourne Renegades (CF)	14	8	4	2	18	−0.149
3	Brisbane Heat (EF)	14	8	5	1	17	0.517
4	Adelaide Strikers (RU)	14	7	6	1	15	0.707
5	Melbourne Stars	14	5	7	2	12	−0.385
6	Hobart Hurricanes	14	5	8	1	11	−0.258
7	Sydney Thunder	14	4	8	2	10	−0.301
8	Sydney Sixers	14	4	9	1	9	−0.704

Source: cricket.com.au, ESPN Cricinfo
- The top 4 teams advanced to the play-off phase

=== Win–loss table ===
Below is a summary of results for each team's fourteen regular season matches, plus finals where applicable, in chronological order. A team's opponent for any given match is listed above the margin of victory/defeat.

Team	1	2	3	4	5	6	7	8	9	10	11	12	13	14	EF	CF	F	Pos.
Adelaide; Strikers (ADS)	SYT; 30 runs	MLR; 8 wkts	HBH; N/R	BRH; 5 runs	PRS; S/O	MLR; 6 wkts	MLS; 37 runs	SYT; 18 runs	SYS; 8 wkts	HBH; 48 runs	BRH; 8 wkts	PRS; 12 runs	SYS; 8 wkts	MLS; 9 wkts	BRH; 8 wkts	MLR; 9 wkts	PRS; 12 runs	4th (RU)
Brisbane; Heat (BRH)	PRS; S/O	PRS; 59 runs	MLS; N/R	ADS; 5 runs	HBH; 8 wkts	HBH; 14 runs	MLS; 8 wkts	MLR; 15 runs	SYT; 5 wkts	SYS; 8 wkts	SYS; 3 wkts	ADS; 8 wkts	SYT; 9 runs	MLR; 43 runs	ADS; 8 wkts	X	X	3rd (EF)
Hobart; Hurricanes (HBH)	MLR; 6 wkts	SYS; 5 wkts	MLS; 63 runs	ADS; N/R	BRH; 8 wkts	MLS; 6 wkts	BRH; 14 runs	SYT; 37 runs	SYS; 31 runs	PRS; 2 runs	PRS; 5 wkts	ADS; 48 runs	MLR; 52 runs	SYT; 4 runs	X	X	X	6th
Melbourne; Renegades (MLR)	HBH; 6 wkts	ADS; 8 wkts	PRS; N/R	SYS; 7 wkts	SYT; 9 runs	SYS; 12 runs	ADS; 6 wkts	PRS; 40 runs	BRH; 15 runs	MLS; 7 wkts	MLS; N/R	SYT; 4 runs	HBH; 52 runs	BRH; 43 runs	→	ADS; 9 wkts	X	2nd (CF)
Melbourne; Stars (MLS)	SYS; 6 wkts	HBH; 63 runs	SYS; 30 runs	BRH; N/R	SYT; 12 runs	HBH; 6 wkts	SYT; 19 runs	BRH; 8 wkts	ADS; 37 runs	MLR; 7 wkts	PRS; 10 wkts	MLR; N/R	PRS; 4 wkts	ADS; 9 wkts	X	X	X	5th
Perth; Scorchers (PRS)	BRH; S/O	BRH; 59 runs	MLR; N/R	SYT; 81 runs	ADS; S/O	SYS; 44 runs	MLR; 40 runs	HBH; 2 runs	HBH; 5 wkts	MLS; 10 wkts	SYT; N/R	ADS; 12 runs	MLS; 4 wkts	SYS; 8 wkts	→	→	ADS; 12 runs	1st (C)
Sydney; Sixers (SYS)	MLS; 6 wkts	HBH; 5 wkts	MLS; 30 runs	SYT; N/R	MLR; 7 wkts	MLR; 12 runs	PRS; 44 runs	HBH; 31 runs	BRH; 8 wkts	ADS; 8 wkts	BRH; 3 wkts	SYT; 6 wkts	ADS; 8 wkts	PRS; 8 wkts	X	X	X	8th
Sydney; Thunder (SYT)	ADS; 30 runs	SYS; N/R	PRS; 81 runs	MLS; 12 runs	MLR; 9 runs	MLS; 19 runs	HBH; 37 runs	BRH; 5 wkts	ADS; 18 runs	PRS; N/R	SYS; 6 wkts	MLR; 4 runs	BRH; 9 runs	HBH; 4 runs	X	X	X	7th

Team's results→	Won	Tied	Lost	N/R

== Fixtures ==
As per all previous seasons, WBBL|07 featured a 56-match double round-robin, followed by a finals series featuring the top four qualifiers. The original fixture was released on 8 July 2021, with Cricket Australia (CA) noting the schedule was subject to any changes that may be required in response to the COVID-19 pandemic.

On 16 September, CA announced the opening fortnight of the competition would be shifted to Tasmania. 20 games featuring all eight teams were scheduled to be played at three venues, beginning with Blundstone Arena in Hobart before moving to University of Tasmania Stadium and its neighbouring Invermay Park in Launceston. On 7 October, CA revealed the revised schedule for the remaining 36 regular season games, which consisted of blocks of matches in Perth, Launceston, Adelaide and Mackay.

On 8 November, CA confirmed the last week of the regular season (November 17–21) would be the inaugural WBBL First Nations Round, intending to mark the league's commitment to deepening education and meaningful connection with Indigenous People of Australia. During the round, teams wore Indigenous kits designed by Aboriginal and Torres Strait Islanders artists, and observed Welcome to Country and smoking ceremonies.

=== Week 1 ===
Match 1
14 October 2021
19:40 (N)
Scorecard

Melbourne Stars; 1/99 (11 overs)	v	Sydney Sixers; 4/100 (10.2 overs)
Elyse Villani 54* (31)		Alyssa Healy 57 (27); Rhys McKenna 1/9 (1 over)

Sydney Sixers won by 6 wickets (with 4 balls remaining)
Blundstone Arena, Hobart
Umpires: Roberto Howard and David Taylor
Player of the match: Alyssa Healy (Sydney Sixers)

- Sydney Sixers won the toss and elected to field.
- The match was reduced to 11 overs per side due to rain.
- Broadcast by Seven Network and Foxtel

Match 2
16 October 2021
15:40
Scorecard

Hobart Hurricanes; 121 (20 overs)	v	Melbourne Renegades; 125/4 (19.2 overs)
Naomi Stalenberg 28 (27); Georgia Wareham 3/13 (4 overs)		Jemimah Rodrigues 33 (34); Belinda Vakarewa 2/21 (4 overs)

Melbourne Renegades won by 6 wickets (with 4 balls remaining)
Blundstone Arena, Hobart
Umpires: Andrew Crozier and Claire Polosak
Player of the match: Georgia Wareham (Melbourne Renegades)

- Hobart Hurricanes won the toss and elected to bat.
- Broadcast by Seven Network and Foxtel

Match 3
16 October 2021
19:05 (N)
Scorecard

Adelaide Strikers; 7/140 (20 overs)	v	Sydney Thunder; 110 (19.2 overs)
Tahlia McGrath 42 (34); Lauren Smith 2/17 (2 overs)		Corinne Hall 38 (35); Tahlia McGrath 3/17 (4 overs)

Adelaide Strikers won by 30 runs
Blundstone Arena, Hobart
Umpires: Simon Lightbody and Mattis van Eck
Player of the match: Tahlia McGrath (Adelaide Strikers)

- Sydney Thunder won the toss and elected to field.
- Broadcast by Seven Network and Foxtel
- At 19 years and 264 days, Hannah Darlington (Sydney Thunder) became the youngest player to captain a team in a WBBL match.

Match 4
17 October 2021
13:40
Scorecard

Perth Scorchers; 7/137 (20 overs)	v	Brisbane Heat; 9/137 (20 overs)
Beth Mooney 40 (37); Jess Jonassen 3/16 (4 overs)		Grace Harris 41 (27); Lilly Mills 3/28 (4 overs)

Match tied
(Perth Scorchers won the Super Over)
Blundstone Arena, Hobart
Umpires: Claire Polosak and Mattis van Eck
Player of the match: Alana King (Perth Scorchers)

- Brisbane Heat won the toss and elected to field.
- Broadcast by Seven Network and Foxtel
- Start time swapped with Match 5
- Super Over: Brisbane Heat 2/12 (1 over), Perth Scorchers 0/14 (0.4 overs)

Match 5
17 October 2021
10:15
Scorecard

Hobart Hurricanes; 9/125 (20 overs)	v	Sydney Sixers; 5/129 (19.3 overs)
Richa Ghosh 46 (46); Ellyse Perry 2/9 (2 overs)		Shafali Verma 57 (50); Molly Strano 3/19 (4 overs)

Sydney Sixers won by 5 wickets (with 3 balls remaining)
Blundstone Arena, Hobart
Umpires: Roberto Howard and David Taylor
Player of the match: Shafali Verma (Sydney Sixers)

- Sydney Sixers won the toss and elected to field.
- Broadcast by Seven Network and Foxtel
- Start time swapped with Match 4

Match 6
19 October 2021
13:25
Scorecard

Hobart Hurricanes; 4/152 (20 overs)	v	Melbourne Stars; 89 (19.2 overs)
Rachel Priest 107* (68); Annabel Sutherland 2/22 (4 overs)		Meg Lanning 25 (28); Ruth Johnston 4/8 (3.2 overs)

Hobart Hurricanes won by 63 runs
Blundstone Arena, Hobart
Umpires: Simon Lightbody and Mattis van Eck
Player of the match: Rachel Priest (Hobart Hurricanes)

- Melbourne Stars won the toss and elected to field.
- Broadcast by Cricket Network and Foxtel

Match 7
19 October 2021
16:50 (D/N)
Scorecard

Brisbane Heat; 5/162 (20 overs)	v	Perth Scorchers; 103 (17.2 overs)
Georgia Redmayne 59* (52); Heather Graham 2/15 (4 overs)		Sophie Devine 18 (15); Grace Harris 3/16 (3.2 overs)

Brisbane Heat won by 59 runs
Blundstone Arena, Hobart
Umpires: Andrew Crozier and Jeremiah Matibiri
Player of the match: Georgia Redmayne (Brisbane Heat)

- Perth Scorchers won the toss and elected to field.
- Broadcast by Cricket Network and Foxtel

Match 8
20 October 2021
13:25
Scorecard

Melbourne Renegades; 6/126 (20 overs)	v	Adelaide Strikers; 2/129 (17.3 overs)
Harmanpreet Kaur 41 (37); Sarah Coyte 3/20 (4 overs)		Tahlia McGrath 50* (39); Ellie Falconer 1/14 (1 over)

Adelaide Strikers won by 8 wickets (with 15 balls remaining)
Blundstone Arena, Hobart
Umpires: Muhammad Qureshi and David Taylor
Player of the match: Tahlia McGrath (Adelaide Strikers)

- Melbourne Renegades won the toss and elected to bat.
- Broadcast by Cricket Network and Foxtel

Match 9
20 October 2021
16:50 (D/N)
Scorecard

Melbourne Stars; 3/139 (20 overs)	v	Sydney Sixers; 8/109 (20 overs)
Annabel Sutherland 57 (50); Ashleigh Gardner 2/16 (4 overs)		Ellyse Perry 40 (43); Kim Garth 3/17 (4 overs)

Melbourne Stars won by 30 runs
Blundstone Arena, Hobart
Umpires: Roberto Howard and Mattis van Eck
Player of the match: Annabel Sutherland (Melbourne Stars)

- Sydney Sixers won the toss and elected to field.
- Broadcast by Cricket Network and Foxtel

=== Week 2 ===
Match 10
23 October 2021
10:15
Scorecard

Hobart Hurricanes; 5/107 (16 overs)	v	Adelaide Strikers
Mignon du Preez 39 (35); Amanda-Jade Wellington 2/16 (3 overs)

No result
Invermay Park, Launceston
Umpires: Simon Burns and Roberto Howard

- Adelaide Strikers won the toss and elected to field.
- No further play was possible due to rain.
- Broadcast by Cricket Network and Foxtel

Match 11
23 October 2021
14:00
Scorecard

Melbourne Stars	v	Brisbane Heat

Match abandoned
Invermay Park, Launceston
Umpires: Andrew Crozier and Mattis van Eck

- No toss
- No play was possible due to rain.
- Broadcast by Cricket Network and Foxtel

Match 12
23 October 2021
15:40
Scorecard

Sydney Thunder	v	Sydney Sixers

Match abandoned
University of Tasmania Stadium, Launceston
Umpires: Claire Polosak and Muhammad Qureshi

- No toss
- No play was possible due to rain.
- Broadcast by Seven Network and Foxtel

Match 13
23 October 2021
19:05 (N)
Scorecard

Perth Scorchers	v	Melbourne Renegades

Match abandoned
University of Tasmania Stadium, Launceston
Umpires: Simon Lightbody and Jeremiah Matibiri

- No toss
- No play was possible due to rain.
- Broadcast by Seven Network and Foxtel

Match 14
24 October 2021
10:15
Scorecard

Brisbane Heat; 5/104 (11 overs)	v	Adelaide Strikers; 4/99 (11 overs)
Georgia Voll 31* (17); Darcie Brown 3/28 (3 overs)		Laura Wolvaardt 54 (30); Jess Jonassen 2/17 (2 overs)

Brisbane Heat won by 5 runs
Invermay Park, Launceston
Umpires: Roberto Howard and Muhammad Qureshi
Player of the match: Laura Wolvaardt (Adelaide Strikers)

- Adelaide Strikers won the toss and elected to field.
- The match was reduced to 11 overs per side after a wet outfield delayed the start of play.
- Broadcast by Cricket Network and Foxtel
- Darcie Brown (Adelaide Strikers) became the sixth player to take a WBBL hat-trick.

Match 15
24 October 2021
13:40
Scorecard

Sydney Sixers; 4/118 (20 overs)	v	Melbourne Renegades; 3/120 (17 overs)
Ellyse Perry 50* (51); Harmanpreet Kaur 2/17 (4 overs)		Evelyn Jones 38 (30); Radha Yadav 1/12 (2 overs)

Melbourne Renegades won by 7 wickets (with 18 balls remaining)
University of Tasmania Stadium, Launceston
Umpires: Shawn Craig and Mattis van Eck
Player of the match: Harmanpreet Kaur (Melbourne Renegades)

- Melbourne Renegades won the toss and elected to field.
- Broadcast by Seven Network and Foxtel

Match 16
24 October 2021
17:15 (D/N)
Scorecard

Perth Scorchers; 2/186 (20 overs)	v	Sydney Thunder; 9/105 (20 overs)
Sophie Devine 101 (60); Issy Wong 1/24 (3 overs)		Phoebe Litchfield 24 (34); Alana King 4/11 (4 overs)

Perth Scorchers won by 81 runs
University of Tasmania Stadium, Launceston
Umpires: Andrew Crozier and Simon Lightbody
Player of the match: Sophie Devine (Perth Scorchers)

- Sydney Thunder won the toss and elected to field.
- Broadcast by Seven Network and Foxtel

Match 17
26 October 2021
13:25
Scorecard

Melbourne Stars; 7/108 (20 overs)	v	Sydney Thunder; 5/96 (20 overs)
Elyse Villani 52 (63); Issy Wong 2/19 (4 overs)		Deepti Sharma 44* (48); Kim Garth 3/11 (4 overs)

Melbourne Stars won by 12 runs
University of Tasmania Stadium, Launceston
Umpires: Andrew Crozier and David Taylor
Player of the match: Kim Garth (Melbourne Stars)

- Melbourne Stars won the toss and elected to bat.
- Broadcast by Cricket Network and Foxtel

Match 18
26 October 2021
16:50 (N)
Scorecard

Hobart Hurricanes; 8/132 (20 overs)	v	Brisbane Heat; 2/138 (18.3 overs)
Ruth Johnston 47 (42); Jess Jonassen 3/14 (4 overs)		Grace Harris 57* (46); Nicola Carey 2/16 (3 overs)

Brisbane Heat won by 8 wickets (with 9 balls remaining)
University of Tasmania Stadium, Launceston
Umpires: Shawn Craig and Muhammad Qureshi
Player of the match: Grace Harris (Brisbane Heat)

- Brisbane Heat won the toss and elected to field.
- Broadcast by Cricket Network and Foxtel

Match 19
27 October 2021
13:25
Scorecard

Melbourne Renegades; 5/142 (20 overs)	v	Sydney Thunder; 8/133 (20 overs)
Jemimah Rodrigues 75* (56); Kate Peterson 1/10 (2 overs)		Smriti Mandhana 64 (44); Courtney Webb 3/21 (3 overs)

Melbourne Renegades won by 9 runs
University of Tasmania Stadium, Launceston
Umpires: Andrew Crozier and Roberto Howard
Player of the match: Jemimah Rodrigues (Melbourne Renegades)

- Melbourne Renegades won the toss and elected to bat.
- Broadcast by Cricket Network and Foxtel

Match 20
27 October 2021
16:50 (D/N)
Scorecard

Melbourne Stars; 4/144 (20 overs)	v	Hobart Hurricanes; 4/147 (19.2 overs)
Kim Garth 44* (29); Tayla Vlaeminck 3/27 (4 overs)		Mignon du Preez 62 (45); Sophie Day 1/17 (2 overs)

Hobart Hurricanes won by 6 wickets (with 4 balls remaining)
University of Tasmania Stadium, Launceston
Umpires: Simon Lightbody and Claire Polosak
Player of the match: Mignon du Preez (Hobart Hurricanes)

- Hobart Hurricanes won the toss and elected to field.
- Broadcast by Cricket Network and Foxtel

=== Week 3 ===
Match 21
30 October 2021
10:25
Scorecard

Melbourne Renegades; 7/142 (20 overs)	v	Sydney Sixers; 9/130 (20 overs)
Harmanpreet Kaur 43 (32); Ashleigh Gardner 2/8 (2 overs)		Maitlan Brown 31 (20); Ellie Falconer 2/28 (4 overs)

Melbourne Renegades won by 12 runs
Lilac Hill Park, Perth
Umpires: Trent Steenholdt and Jamie Thomas
Player of the match: Jess Duffin (Melbourne Renegades)

- Sydney Sixers won the toss and elected to field.
- Broadcast by Cricket Network and Foxtel

Match 22
30 October 2021
16:05 (D/N)
Scorecard

Sydney Thunder; 5/133 (20 overs)	v	Melbourne Stars; 8/114 (20 overs)
Tahlia Wilson 53 (53); Erin Osborne 2/25 (4 overs)		Elyse Villani 38 (31); Deepti Sharma 3/25 (4 overs)

Sydney Thunder won by 19 runs
University of Tasmania Stadium, Launceston
Umpires: Roberto Howard and Jeremiah Matibiri
Player of the match: Samantha Bates (Sydney Thunder)

- Sydney Thunder won the toss and elected to bat.
- Broadcast by Cricket Network and Foxtel

Match 23
30 October 2021
13:50
Scorecard

Perth Scorchers; 5/121 (20 overs)	v	Adelaide Strikers; 8/121 (20 overs)
Beth Mooney 36 (33); Amanda-Jade Wellington 2/12 (4 overs)		Katie Mack 24 (30); Lilly Mills 2/18 (3 overs)

Match tied
(Perth Scorchers won the Super Over)
Lilac Hill Park, Perth
Umpires: Jarryd Buscall and Nathan Johnstone
Player of the match: Beth Mooney (Perth Scorchers)

- Perth Scorchers won the toss and elected to bat.
- Broadcast by Cricket Network and Foxtel
- Super Over: Adelaide Strikers 2/9 (1 over), Perth Scorchers 0/12 (0.2 overs)

Match 24
30 October 2021
19:30 (N)
Scorecard

Brisbane Heat; 6/170 (20 overs)	v	Hobart Hurricanes; 9/156 (20 overs)
Grace Harris 75 (51); Ruth Johnston 2/30 (4 overs)		Mignon du Preez 73 (49); Jess Jonassen 3/25 (4 overs)

Brisbane Heat won by 14 runs
University of Tasmania Stadium, Launceston
Umpires: Simon Burns and Andrew Crozier
Player of the match: Grace Harris (Brisbane Heat)

- Hobart Hurricanes won the toss and elected to field.
- Broadcast by Cricket Network and Foxtel

Match 25
31 October 2021
10:15
Scorecard

Sydney Thunder; 6/146 (20 overs)	v	Hobart Hurricanes; 8/109 (20 overs)
Smriti Mandhana 50 (50); Nicola Carey 2/36 (4 overs)		Mignon du Preez 41 (39); Deepti Sharma 3/13 (4 overs)

Sydney Thunder won by 37 runs
University of Tasmania Stadium, Launceston
Umpires: Shawn Craig and Roberto Howard
Player of the match: Deepti Sharma (Sydney Thunder)

- Sydney Thunder won the toss and elected to bat.
- Broadcast by Seven Network and Foxtel

Match 26
31 October 2021
10:25
Scorecard

Adelaide Strikers; 5/160 (20 overs)	v	Melbourne Renegades; 4/162 (19.4 overs)
Dane van Niekerk 62 (47); Harmanpreet Kaur 2/31 (4 overs)		Harmanpreet Kaur 73* (46); Megan Schutt 2/18 (4 overs)

Melbourne Renegades won by 6 wickets (with 2 balls remaining)
Lilac Hill Park, Perth
Umpires: Nathan Johnstone and Jamie Thomas
Player of the match: Harmanpreet Kaur (Melbourne Renegades)

- Adelaide Strikers won the toss and elected to bat.
- Broadcast by Cricket Network and Foxtel

Match 27
31 October 2021
13:40
Scorecard

Brisbane Heat; 9/95 (20 overs)	v	Melbourne Stars; 2/99 (16.4 overs)
Grace Harris 28 (23); Annabel Sutherland 3/21 (4 overs)		Maia Bouchier 32* (34); Nicola Hancock 1/14 (3 overs)

Melbourne Stars won by 8 wickets (with 20 balls remaining)
University of Tasmania Stadium, Launceston
Umpires: Andrew Crozier and David Taylor
Player of the match: Tess Flintoff (Melbourne Stars)

- Brisbane Heat won the toss and elected to bat.
- Broadcast by Seven Network and Foxtel

Match 28
31 October 2021
13:50
Scorecard

Sydney Sixers; 3/161 (20 overs)	v	Perth Scorchers; 9/117 (20 overs)
Alyssa Healy 94* (57); Taneale Peschel 2/34 (4 overs)		Beth Mooney 30 (29); Nicole Bolton 3/11 (2 overs)

Sydney Sixers won by 44 runs
Lilac Hill Park, Perth
Umpires: Jarryd Buscall and Trent Steenholdt
Player of the match: Alyssa Healy (Sydney Sixers)

- Sydney Sixers won the toss and elected to bat.
- Broadcast by Cricket Network and Foxtel

=== Week 4 ===
Match 29
3 November 2021
10:25
Scorecard

Sydney Sixers; 4/141 (20 overs)	v	Hobart Hurricanes; 7/110 (20 overs)
Ashleigh Gardner 51 (49); Tayla Vlaeminck 1/22 (4 overs)		Rachel Priest 27 (29); Maitlan Brown 2/15 (4 overs)

Sydney Sixers won by 31 runs
WACA Ground, Perth
Umpires: Trent Steenholdt and Dean Trigg
Player of the match: Ashleigh Gardner (Sydney Sixers)

- Hobart Hurricanes won the toss and elected to field.
- Broadcast by Cricket Network and Foxtel

Match 30
3 November 2021
13:50
Scorecard

Perth Scorchers; 2/194 (20 overs)	v	Melbourne Renegades; 6/154 (20 overs)
Beth Mooney 101* (63); Harmanpreet Kaur 1/32 (3 overs)		Courtney Webb 46 (34); Lilly Mills 4/25 (3 overs)

Perth Scorchers won by 40 runs
WACA Ground, Perth
Umpires: Jarryd Buscall and Nathan Johnstone
Player of the match: Beth Mooney (Perth Scorchers)

- Perth Scorchers won the toss and elected to bat.
- Broadcast by Cricket Network and Foxtel

Match 31
6 November 2021
9:45
Scorecard

Melbourne Renegades; 4/207 (20 overs)	v	Brisbane Heat; 192 (20 overs)
Harmanpreet Kaur 65 (32); Grace Harris 1/29 (3 overs)		Laura Kimmince 42 (21); Ellie Falconer 4/29 (4 overs)

Melbourne Renegades won by 15 runs
Karen Rolton Oval, Adelaide
Umpires: Shawn Craig and Harsimran Singh
Player of the match: Harmanpreet Kaur (Melbourne Renegades)

- Brisbane Heat won the toss and elected to field.
- Broadcast by Cricket Network and Foxtel
- The combined team totals of 399 runs set a new record for highest match aggregate in WBBL history.

Match 32
6 November 2021
13:10
Scorecard

Melbourne Stars; 4/126 (14 overs)	v	Adelaide Strikers; 8/89 (14 overs)
Meg Lanning 82 (45); Dane van Niekerk 2/15 (2 overs)		Katie Mack 14* (8); Rhys McKenna 2/3 (1 over)

Melbourne Stars won by 37 runs
Karen Rolton Oval, Adelaide
Umpires: Simon Lightbody and David Taylor
Player of the match: Meg Lanning (Melbourne Stars)

- Adelaide Strikers won the toss and elected to field.
- The match was reduced to 14 overs per side due to rain.
- Broadcast by Cricket Network and Foxtel

Match 33
6 November 2021
13:50
Scorecard

Hobart Hurricanes; 8/137 (20 overs)	v	Perth Scorchers; 8/135 (20 overs)
Rachel Priest 54 (48); Alana King 2/20 (4 overs)		Chamari Atapattu 33 (31); Nicola Carey 2/17 (4 overs)

Hobart Hurricanes won by 2 runs
WACA Ground, Perth
Umpires: Nathan Johnstone and Dean Trigg
Player of the match: Rachel Priest (Hobart Hurricanes)

- Hobart Hurricanes won the toss and elected to bat.
- Broadcast by Cricket Network and Foxtel

Match 34
7 November 2021
9:45
Scorecard

Sydney Thunder; 7/143 (20 overs)	v	Brisbane Heat; 5/144 (18.2 overs)
Phoebe Litchfield 40 (32); Poonam Yadav 3/17 (4 overs)		Georgia Redmayne 57 (45); Hannah Darlington 3/21 (4 overs)

Brisbane Heat won by 5 wickets (with 10 balls remaining)
Adelaide Oval, Adelaide
Umpires: Claire Polosak and Harsimran Singh
Player of the match: Georgia Redmayne (Brisbane Heat)

- Sydney Thunder won the toss and elected to bat.
- Broadcast by Seven Network and Foxtel

Match 35
7 November 2021
13:10
Scorecard

Melbourne Stars; 103 (20 overs)	v	Melbourne Renegades; 3/104 (14.1 overs)
Kim Garth 32 (24); Harmanpreet Kaur 3/22 (4 overs)		Jemimah Rodrigues 45 (38); Kim Garth 2/23 (4 overs)

Melbourne Renegades won by 7 wickets (with 35 balls remaining)
Adelaide Oval, Adelaide
Umpires: Simon Lightbody and Eloise Sheridan
Player of the match: Sophie Molineux (Melbourne Renegades)

- Melbourne Stars won the toss and elected to bat.
- Broadcast by Seven Network and Foxtel

Match 36
7 November 2021
13:50
Scorecard

Hobart Hurricanes; 96 (20 overs)	v	Perth Scorchers; 5/99 (15.3 overs)
Ruth Johnston 38 (40); Marizanne Kapp 4/10 (4 overs)		Chloe Piparo 29 (33); Tayla Vlaeminck 3/21 (4 overs)

Perth Scorchers won by 5 wickets (with 27 balls remaining)
WACA Ground, Perth
Umpires: Jarryd Buscall and Trent Steenholdt
Player of the match: Marizanne Kapp (Perth Scorchers)

- Hobart Hurricanes won the toss and elected to bat.
- Broadcast by Cricket Network and Foxtel

=== Week 5 ===
Match 37
9 November 2021
14:05
Scorecard

Sydney Sixers; 2/159 (20 overs)	v	Brisbane Heat; 2/162 (18.3 overs)
Ashleigh Gardner 86* (52); Georgia Prestwidge 1/23 (3 overs)		Grace Harris 54 (39); Radha Yadav 1/33 (4 overs)

Brisbane Heat won by 8 wickets (with 9 balls remaining)
Karen Rolton Oval, Adelaide
Umpires: Dhaval Bhatt and David Taylor
Player of the match: Ashleigh Gardner (Sydney Sixers)

- Sydney Sixers won the toss and elected to bat.
- Broadcast by Cricket Network and Foxtel

Match 38
9 November 2021
17:30 (D/N)
Scorecard

Adelaide Strikers; 4/176 (20 overs)	v	Sydney Thunder; 6/158 (20 overs)
Dane van Niekerk 58 (46); Sammy-Jo Johnson 2/25 (4 overs)		Issy Wong 43 (17); Tahlia McGrath 2/20 (4 overs)

Adelaide Strikers won by 18 runs
Karen Rolton Oval, Adelaide
Umpires: Nathan Johnstone and Simon Lightbody
Player of the match: Laura Wolvaardt (Adelaide Strikers)

- Adelaide Strikers won the toss and elected to bat.
- Broadcast by Cricket Network and Foxtel

Match 39
10 November 2021
12:55
Scorecard

Melbourne Stars; 9/97 (20 overs)	v	Perth Scorchers; 0/98 (10.5 overs)
Kim Garth 31 (31); Sophie Devine 2/11 (3 overs)		Beth Mooney 57* (38)

Perth Scorchers won by 10 wickets (with 55 balls remaining)
Karen Rolton Oval, Adelaide
Umpires: Dhaval Bhatt and Simon Lightbody
Player of the match: Sophie Devine (Perth Scorchers)

- Melbourne Stars won the toss and elected to bat.
- Broadcast by Cricket Network and Foxtel

Match 40
10 November 2021
16:20 (D/N)
Scorecard

Sydney Sixers; 4/142 (20 overs)	v	Adelaide Strikers; 2/148 (18.4 overs)
Shafali Verma 53* (43); Darcie Brown 2/34 (4 overs)		Katie Mack 67* (55); Maitlan Brown 1/30 (4 overs)

Adelaide Strikers won by 8 wickets (with 8 balls remaining)
Karen Rolton Oval, Adelaide
Umpires: Nathan Johnstone and David Taylor
Player of the match: Katie Mack (Adelaide Strikers)

- Sydney Sixers won the toss and elected to bat.
- Broadcast by Cricket Network and Foxtel

Match 41
11 November 2021
12:55
Scorecard

Perth Scorchers; 2/184 (20 overs)	v	Sydney Thunder; 1/21 (2.3 overs)
Beth Mooney 83* (53); Hannah Darlington 1/32 (4 overs)		Smriti Mandhana 12* (8); Marizanne Kapp 1/8 (1.3 overs)

No result
Karen Rolton Oval, Adelaide
Umpires: Dhaval Bhatt and Nathan Johnstone

- Perth Scorchers won the toss and elected to bat.
- No further play was possible due to rain.
- Broadcast by Cricket Network and Foxtel

Match 42
11 November 2021
16:20 (D/N)
Scorecard

Melbourne Renegades	v	Melbourne Stars

Match abandoned
Karen Rolton Oval, Adelaide
Umpires: Eloise Sheridan and David Taylor

- No toss
- No play was possible due to rain.
- Broadcast by Cricket Network and Foxtel

Match 43
13 November 2021
14:40
Scorecard

Adelaide Strikers; 4/142 (20 overs)	v	Hobart Hurricanes; 94 (18.2 overs)
Dane van Niekerk 44 (38); Molly Strano 2/23 (4 overs)		Mignon du Preez 21 (24); Darcie Brown 3/19 (4 overs)

Adelaide Strikers won by 48 runs
Harrup Park, Mackay
Umpires: Steven Farrell and Simon Lightbody
Player of the match: Darcie Brown (Adelaide Strikers)

- Hobart Hurricanes won the toss and elected to field.
- Broadcast by Seven Network and Foxtel
- Hobart Hurricanes were eliminated from finals contention.

Match 44
13 November 2021
18:05 (N)
Scorecard

Sydney Sixers; 7/91 (20 overs)	v	Brisbane Heat; 7/92 (14.1 overs)
Nicole Bolton 25 (31); Jess Jonassen 3/15 (4 overs)		Georgia Redmayne 19 (16); Lauren Cheatle 3/16 (4 overs)

Brisbane Heat won by 3 wickets (with 35 balls remaining)
Harrup Park, Mackay
Umpires: Stephen Dionysius and Eloise Sheridan
Player of the match: Courtney Sippel (Brisbane Heat)

- Brisbane Heat won the toss and elected to field.
- Broadcast by Seven Network and Foxtel
- Melbourne Renegades qualified for finals.

Match 45
14 November 2021
9:15
Scorecard

Brisbane Heat; 7/94 (20 overs)	v	Adelaide Strikers; 2/98 (16.2 overs)
Laura Kimmince 22* (11); Amanda-Jade Wellington 2/21 (4 overs)		Katie Mack 54* (48); Courtney Sippel 2/22 (4 overs)

Adelaide Strikers won by 8 wickets (with 22 balls remaining)
Harrup Park, Mackay
Umpires: Steven Farrell and Claire Polosak
Player of the match: Katie Mack (Adelaide Strikers)

- Brisbane Heat won the toss and elected to bat.
- Broadcast by Seven Network and Foxtel
- Jess Jonassen (Brisbane Heat) became the first player to appear in 100 WBBL matches.

Match 46
14 November 2021
12:40
Scorecard

Sydney Sixers; 6/94 (20 overs)	v	Sydney Thunder; 4/96 (15.2 overs)
Ellyse Perry 40* (40); Hannah Darlington 2/15 (4 overs)		Smriti Mandhana 45 (39); Lauren Cheatle 3/15 (4 overs)

Sydney Thunder won by 6 wickets (with 28 balls remaining)
Harrup Park, Mackay
Umpires: Stephen Dionysius and David Taylor
Player of the match: Issy Wong (Sydney Thunder)

- Sydney Sixers won the toss and elected to bat.
- Broadcast by Seven Network and Foxtel
- Brisbane Heat qualified for finals.

=== Week 6 ===
Match 47
17 November 2021
10:00
Scorecard

Perth Scorchers; 3/177 (20 overs)	v	Adelaide Strikers; 5/165 (20 overs)
Beth Mooney 78 (53); Sarah Coyte 1/27 (3 overs)		Katie Mack 84* (61); Sophie Devine 2/30 (4 overs); Heather Graham 2/30 (4 overs)

Perth Scorchers won by 12 runs
Karen Rolton Oval, Adelaide
Umpires: Harsimran Singh and David Taylor
Player of the match: Beth Mooney (Perth Scorchers)

- Perth Scorchers won the toss and elected to bat.
- Broadcast by Cricket Network and Foxtel
- Start time brought forward from 15:10
- Perth Scorchers qualified for finals.

Match 48
17 November 2021
18:05 (N)
Scorecard

Melbourne Renegades; 4/175 (20 overs)	v	Sydney Thunder; 2/171 (20 overs)
Harmanpreet Kaur 81* (55); Samantha Bates 2/21 (4 overs)		Smriti Mandhana 114* (64); Rhiann O'Donnell 1/25 (3 overs)

Melbourne Renegades won by 4 runs
Harrup Park, Mackay
Umpires: Joshua Adie and Nathan James
Player of the match: Smriti Mandhana (Sydney Thunder)

- Sydney Thunder won the toss and elected to field.
- Broadcast by Cricket Network and Foxtel
- Smriti Mandhana (Sydney Thunder) equalled the WBBL record for most runs scored in an innings.
- Sydney Thunder were eliminated from finals contention.

Match 49
19 November 2021
14:40
Scorecard

Hobart Hurricanes; 5/161 (20 overs)	v	Melbourne Renegades; 109 (18 overs)
Ruth Johnston 63 (46); Courtney Webb 2/27 (4 overs)		Ellie Falconer 24* (12); Sasha Moloney 3/17 (3 overs)

Hobart Hurricanes won by 52 runs
Harrup Park, Mackay
Umpires: Stephen Dionysius and Nathan James
Player of the match: Ruth Johnston (Hobart Hurricanes)

- Melbourne Renegades won the toss and elected to field.
- Broadcast by Cricket Network and Foxtel

Match 50
19 November 2021
18:05 (D/N)
Scorecard

Sydney Thunder; 5/162 (20 overs)	v	Brisbane Heat; 9/153 (20 overs)
Sammy-Jo Johnson 52 (36); Nadine de Klerk 1/15 (3 overs)		Georgia Redmayne 54 (52); Deepti Sharma 2/21 (4 overs)

Sydney Thunder won by 9 runs
Harrup Park, Mackay
Umpires: Joshua Adie and Steven Farrell
Player of the match: Sammy-Jo Johnson (Sydney Thunder)

- Sydney Thunder won the toss and elected to bat.
- Broadcast by Cricket Network and Foxtel

Match 51
20 November 2021
09:45
Scorecard

Melbourne Stars; 7/122 (20 overs)	v	Perth Scorchers; 6/123 (20 overs)
Elyse Villani 84 (66); Heather Graham 3/16 (4 overs)		Mathilda Carmichael 30 (20); Annabel Sutherland 2/20 (4 overs)

Perth Scorchers won by 4 wickets (with 0 balls remaining)
Adelaide Oval, Adelaide
Umpires: Claire Polosak and Eloise Sheridan
Player of the match: Heather Graham (Perth Scorchers)

- Perth Scorchers won the toss and elected to field.
- Broadcast by Seven Network and Foxtel
- Melbourne Stars were eliminated from finals contention.

Match 52
20 November 2021
13:10
Scorecard

Sydney Sixers; 82 (19.2 overs)	v	Adelaide Strikers; 2/84 (10.2 overs)
Lauren Cheatle 16 (16); Sarah Coyte 3/12 (3.2 overs)		Dane van Niekerk 33 (22); Maitlan Brown 1/13 (2 overs)

Adelaide Strikers won by 8 wickets (with 58 balls remaining)
Adelaide Oval, Adelaide
Umpires: Harsimran Singh and David Taylor
Player of the match: Darcie Brown (Adelaide Strikers)

- Sydney Sixers won the toss and elected to bat.
- Broadcast by Seven Network and Foxtel
- Sydney Sixers were eliminated from finals contention and Adelaide Strikers qualified for finals.

Match 53
20 November 2021
14:40
Scorecard

Hobart Hurricanes; 5/147 (20 overs)	v	Sydney Thunder; 9/143 (20 overs)
Mignon du Preez 87* (61); Samantha Bates 2/22 (4 overs)		Sammy-Jo Johnson 39 (21); Belinda Vakarewa 3/8 (4 overs)

Hobart Hurricanes won by 4 runs
Harrup Park, Mackay
Umpires: Joshua Adie and Stephen Dionysius
Player of the match: Belinda Vakarewa (Hobart Hurricanes)

- Hobart Hurricanes won the toss and elected to bat.
- Broadcast by Cricket Network and Foxtel

Match 54
20 November 2021
18:05 (N)
Scorecard

Brisbane Heat; 5/156 (20 overs)	v	Melbourne Renegades; 113 (18.1 overs)
Georgia Redmayne 71 (51); Rhiann O'Donnell 2/26 (3 overs)		Josie Dooley 35 (27); Jess Jonassen 3/10 (3.1 overs)

Brisbane Heat won by 43 runs
Harrup Park, Mackay
Umpires: Steven Farrell and Nathan James
Player of the match: Georgia Redmayne (Brisbane Heat)

- Brisbane Heat won the toss and elected to bat.
- Broadcast by Cricket Network and Foxtel

Match 55
21 November 2021
09:45
Scorecard

Sydney Sixers; 4/128 (20 overs)	v	Perth Scorchers; 2/131 (17.1 overs)
Ellyse Perry 39* (37); Alana King 3/18 (4 overs)		Chloe Piparo 50* (39); Nicole Bolton 1/20 (3 overs)

Perth Scorchers won by 8 wickets (with 17 balls remaining)
Adelaide Oval, Adelaide
Umpires: Dhaval Bhatt and Simon Lightbody
Player of the match: Alana King (Perth Scorchers)

- Sydney Sixers won the toss and elected to bat.
- Broadcast by Seven Network and Foxtel

Match 56
21 November 2021
13:10
Scorecard

Adelaide Strikers; 3/175 (20 overs)	v	Melbourne Stars; 1/181 (19.3 overs)
Katie Mack 89* (67); Annabel Sutherland 2/33 (4 overs)		Elyse Villani 100* (65); Megan Schutt 1/20 (4 overs)

Melbourne Stars won by 9 wickets (with 3 balls remaining)
Adelaide Oval, Adelaide
Umpires: Shawn Craig and Claire Polosak
Player of the match: Elyse Villani (Melbourne Stars)

- Adelaide Strikers won the toss and elected to bat.
- Broadcast by Seven Network and Foxtel
- Former Australian player Erin Osborne made her last WBBL appearance.

== Knockout phase ==
On 7 September 2021, Cricket Australia announced the WBBL would use a new playoffs format for the 2021–22 season.

The WBBL|07 knockout phase would again feature the four highest-ranked teams at the conclusion of the regular season, though it would begin with an 'Eliminator' between the third and fourth seeds. The winner of the Eliminator would then play the second seed in the 'Challenger'. Both the Eliminator and Challenger matches would be played at the home ground of the second seed. The first seed would automatically qualify for the championship decider, simply known as the 'Final', with home ground advantage against the winner of the Challenger.

Alistair Dobson, Cricket Australia's General Manager of Big Bash Leagues, said "the League views the Final as a marquee moment in the summer" and the highest-ranked qualifier will not only "have a guaranteed path to the Final, they'll also have the backing of a strong home crowd, with fans given more time to secure their ticket to the Final".

Perth Stadium was selected as the venue for the Final after the Perth Scorchers finished the regular season on top of the points table. The second-placed Melbourne Renegades selected Adelaide Oval as the venue for the Eliminator and Challenger due to border restrictions preventing matches from being played in their home state of Victoria.

Eliminator
3	Brisbane Heat	8/114
4	Adelaide Strikers	2/118

Challenger
2	Melbourne Renegades	8/83
4	Adelaide Strikers	1/86

Final
1	Perth Scorchers	5/146
4	Adelaide Strikers	6/134

=== Eliminator ===
24 November 2021
18:40 (N)
Scorecard

Brisbane Heat; 8/114 (20 overs)	v	Adelaide Strikers; 2/118 (16.3 overs)
Nicola Hancock 40 (26); Amanda-Jade Wellington 5/8 (4 overs)		Katie Mack 50* (42); Poonam Yadav 1/19 (3 overs)

Adelaide Strikers won by 8 wickets (with 21 balls remaining)
Adelaide Oval, Adelaide
Umpires: Claire Polosak and David Taylor
Player of the match: Amanda-Jade Wellington (Adelaide Strikers)

- Adelaide Strikers won the toss and elected to field.
- Broadcast by Seven Network and Foxtel
- Amanda-Jade Wellington (Adelaide Strikers) set a new WBBL record for best bowling figures in an innings.

=== Challenger ===
25 November 2021
18:40 (N)
Scorecard

Melbourne Renegades; 8/83 (20 overs)	v	Adelaide Strikers; 1/86 (10.5 overs)
Ella Hayward 18* (23); Darcie Brown 2/9 (4 overs)		Dane van Niekerk 43 (30); Carly Leeson 1/5 (1 over)

Adelaide Strikers won by 9 wickets (with 55 balls remaining)
Adelaide Oval, Adelaide
Umpires: Simon Lightbody and Eloise Sheridan
Player of the match: Darcie Brown (Adelaide Strikers)

- Adelaide Strikers won the toss and elected to field.
- Broadcast by Seven Network and Foxtel

=== Final ===
==== Background ====
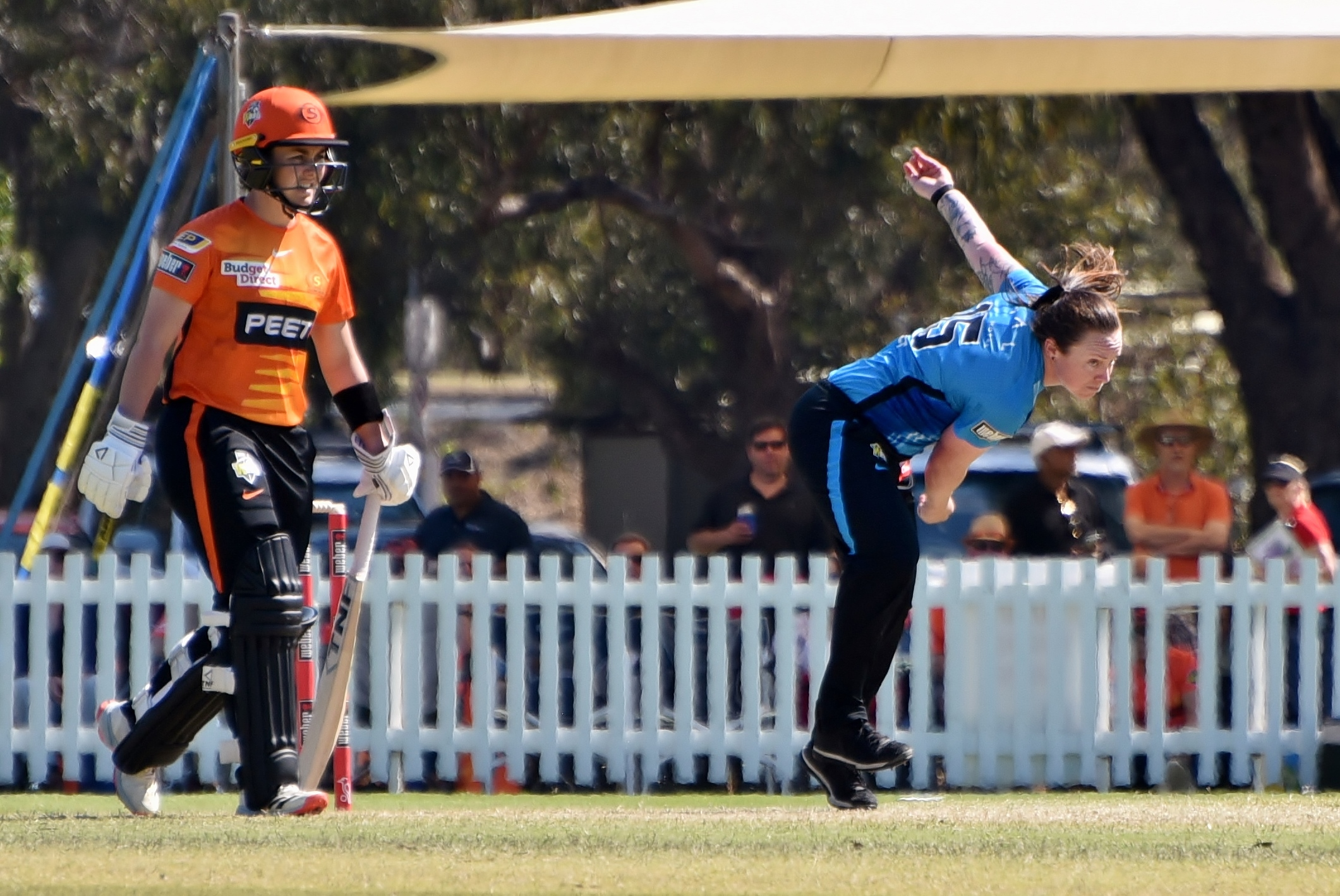
Sarah Coyte bowling for Adelaide Strikers against Perth Scorchers at Lilac Hill Park, Perth, on 30 October 2021. Batter Heather Graham looks on. The Scorchers won the match via Super Over.

Ending the regular season on top of the points table, the Perth Scorchers qualified for their third championship decider. They previously finished as runners-up in WBBL|02 and WBBL|03, losing to the Sydney Sixers on both occasions. Coach Shelley Nitschke, considered a legend of South Australian cricket, and captain Sophie Devine each played for the Adelaide Strikers in the league's inaugural and subsequent seasons before joining the Scorchers in WBBL|06.

After emphatic victories in the Eliminator and Challenger, the Adelaide Strikers qualified for their second championship decider. They previously finished as runners-up in WBBL|05, losing the final which was defined by a Player of the Match innings from then Brisbane Heat (and now Perth Scorchers) batter Beth Mooney. Members of the Strikers' squad to have won a WBBL title include Sarah Coyte, who was named Player of the Final when the Sixers defeated the Scorchers in 2017–18.

All-rounders Marizanne Kapp and Dane van Niekerk were also contributors to the Sixers' past championships but each player moved to new teams, the Scorchers and Strikers respectively, ahead of WBBL|07. They would be the first married couple to compete against one another in a WBBL final—a match-up which garnered media attention with van Niekerk, in an interview days beforehand, noting her own trepidation about facing Kapp's bowling.

While the smaller WACA Ground and Lilac Hill Park serve as their typical home venues, the Scorchers selected Perth Stadium to host the Final, where only two WBBL matches had previously been played. Although the Strikers held an overall 8–6 head-to-head edge coming into the Final, the Scorchers won both encounters earlier in the season—one via Super Over, and the other by 12 runs.

==== Match summary ====
27 November 2021
16:10 (D/N)
Scorecard

Perth Scorchers; 5/146 (20 overs)	v	Adelaide Strikers; 6/134 (20 overs)
Sophie Devine 35 (33); Tahlia McGrath 1/14 (2 overs)		Tahlia McGrath 36 (29); Taneale Peschel 2/23 (4 overs)

Perth Scorchers won by 12 runs
Perth Stadium, Perth
Attendance: 15,511
Umpires: Nathan Johnstone and Simon Lightbody
Player of the match: Marizanne Kapp (Perth Scorchers)

- Adelaide Strikers won the toss and elected to field.
- Broadcast by Seven Network and Foxtel
- The crowd of 15,511 set a new attendance record for a standalone WBBL match.
- Perth Scorchers won their first WBBL title.

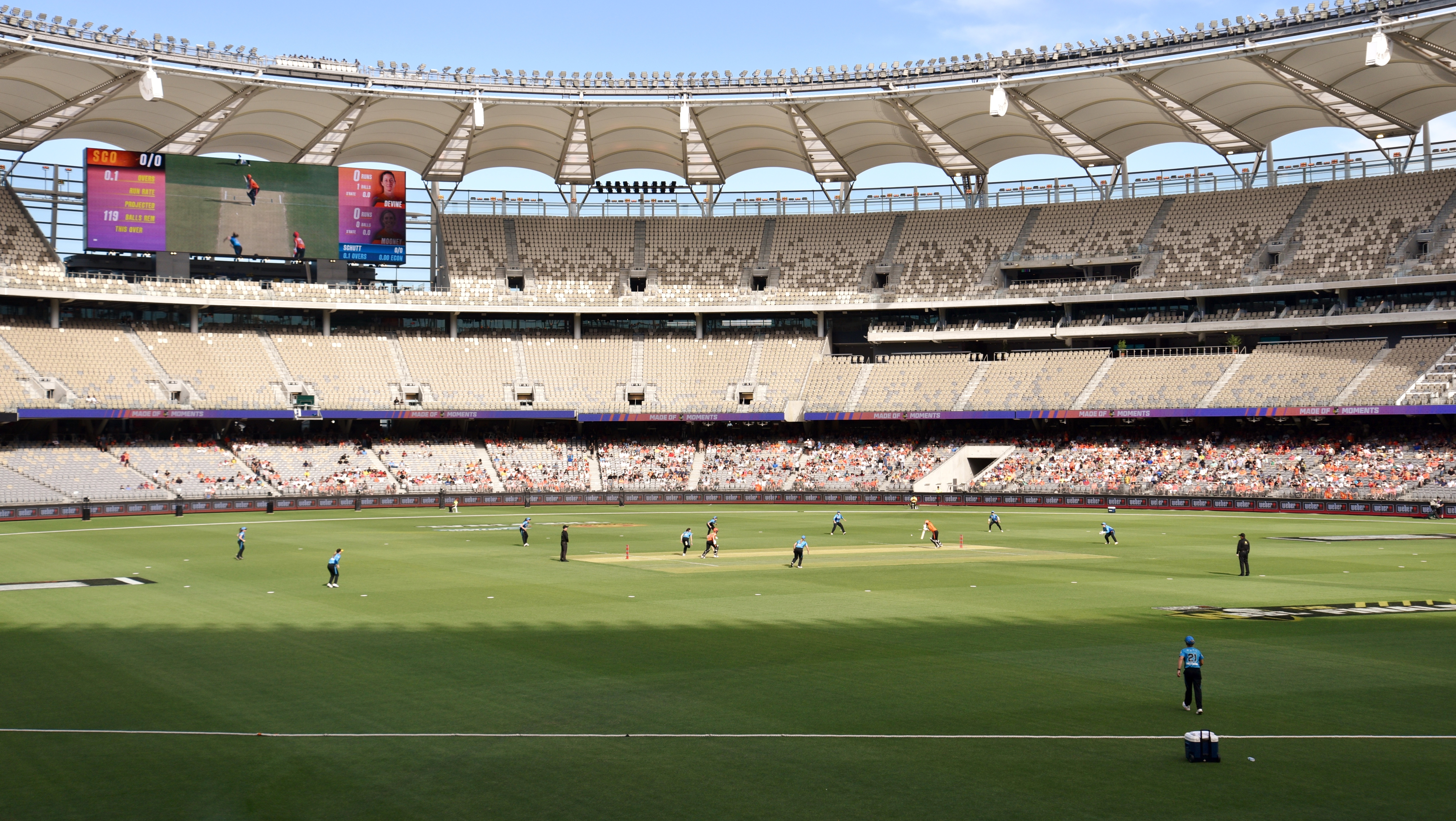
New Zealand marquee and Perth Scorchers captain Sophie Devine faces the first over of the Final, against Adelaide Strikers at Perth Stadium, on 27 November 2021.

Batting first, the Scorchers made a cautious start, scoring 18 from the opening four overs. With runs beginning to flow—Sophie Devine cutting the leading wicket-taker of the season, Amanda-Jade Wellington, for back-to-back boundaries in the seventh over—Strikers captain Tahlia McGrath brought herself on to bowl with immediate effect, claiming the prized wicket of Beth Mooney for 19. Then, having just reached the halfway point of the innings with her team at 1/65, Devine was run out from a direct hit by Dane van Niekerk. The following over, Chloe Piparo was removed for 19, edging a Darcie Brown outswinger which was caught by wicket-keeper Teagan McPharlin.

Heather Graham and Marizanne Kapp met at the crease in the 12th over, and they put on a partnership of 40 runs from the next 32 balls, ending when Graham was caught at cover for 23. Kapp, in her unbeaten innings of 31 from 23, proceeded to strike two boundaries in the 18th over against Sarah Coyte. Alana King managed similar in the 20th to take the Scorchers to a total of 5/146.

Beginning the run chase in "disarray", the Strikers scored just 12 runs in the first four overs, which included a maiden bowled by Kapp to van Niekerk who played-and-missed multiple times. The Strikers finished the powerplay at 2/16—their worst start to an innings for the tournament. Tahlia McGrath and Laura Wolvaardt combined for 61 off the next 45 balls, but the partnership ended in the 14th over when McGrath was caught at point off the bowling of Taneale Peschel.

In the 17th over Bridget Patterson, after hitting a six and a four, was dismissed by Kapp on the fourth ball, though Madeline Penna scored another boundary on the sixth ball to take 17 runs from the over. Now needing 36 off the last 18 deliveries, the Strikers "remained a late chance". However, Alana King and Heather Graham only conceded seven runs each in their subsequent overs, greatly reducing the chances of a Strikers victory. With her team requiring 22 from the final over, Penna could only muster one boundary while Peschel repeatedly beat the bat at the death to seal a 12-run win for the Scorchers.

==== Post-match ====
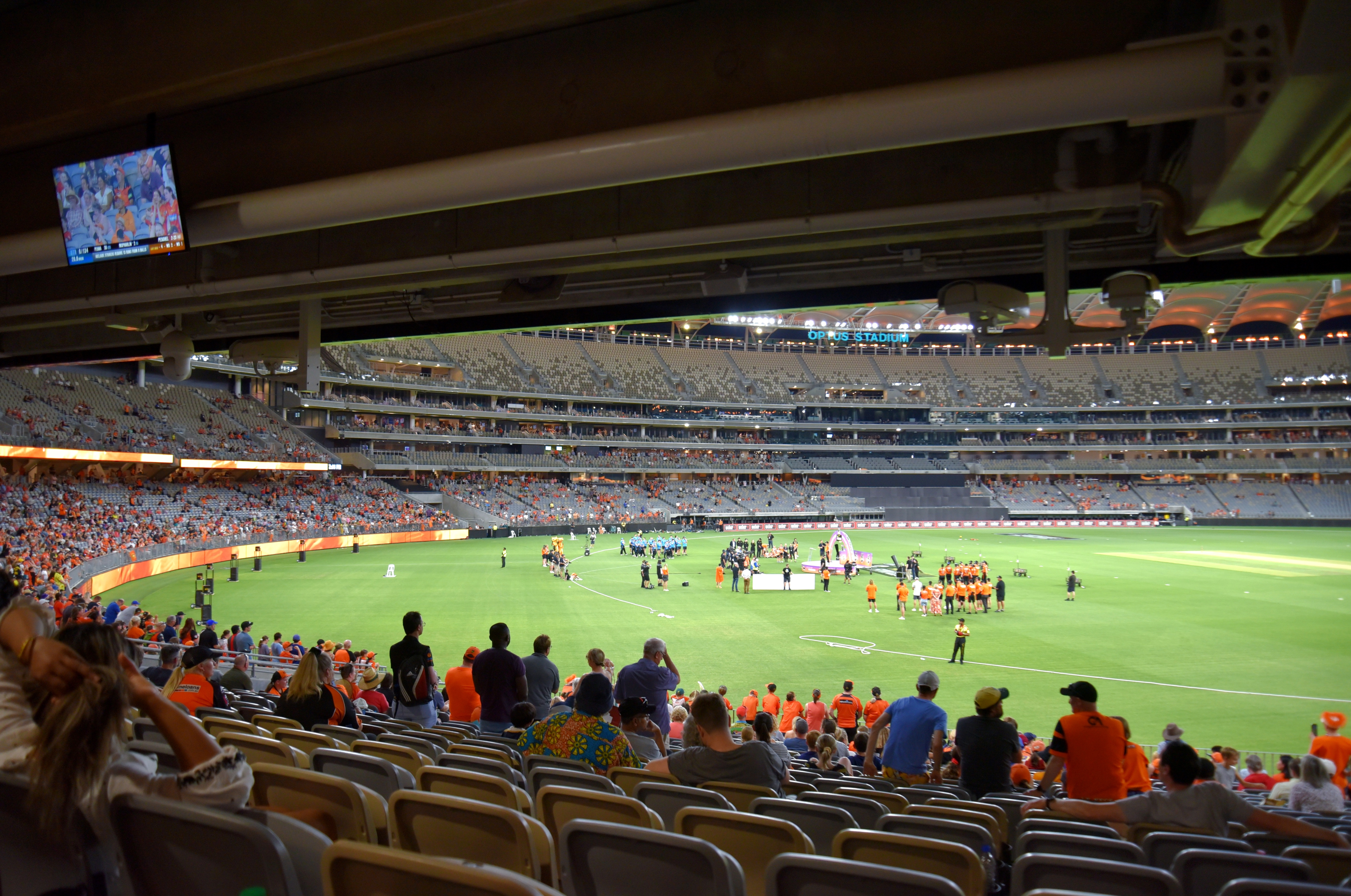
The post-match presentation to the winning Perth Scorchers, 27 November 2021.

The Perth Scorchers became the fourth team to hold the WBBL trophy aloft, following the Sydney Thunder, Sydney Sixers and Brisbane Heat. Writing for News.com.au, Tyson Otto said the Scorchers "never really looked like losing" despite "several dramatic moments", and that they were the "clear standout team of the tournament". Owen Leonard of The Sydney Morning Herald commended the "admirable resistance" of the Strikers' McGrath and Wolvaardt, but claimed the Scorchers' "flawless bowling power play" was "too deep to compensate for".

Having overcome illness during the week leading up to the final, Marizanne Kapp was named Player of the Match for her performance with bat and ball. Kapp and Mooney both claimed their third WBBL championships, a feat previously only achieved by Sammy-Jo Johnson and Lauren Smith.

The crowd of 15,511 spectators was the fourth-highest attendance for any WBBL match (the top three attendances were for matches played as double-headers with the BBL), and also the highest for a WBBL final. The most-watched game in the league's history, the Final rated a combined average audience of 535,000 across TV and streaming platforms, eclipsing the 506,000 audience for the WBBL|04 decider.

== Statistics ==
=== Highest totals ===
Team	Score	Against	Venue	Date
Melbourne Renegades	4/207 (20 overs)	Brisbane Heat	Karen Rolton Oval	6 November 2021
Perth Scorchers	2/194 (20 overs)	Melbourne Renegades	WACA Ground	3 November 2021
Brisbane Heat	192 (20 overs)	Melbourne Renegades	Karen Rolton Oval	6 November 2021
Perth Scorchers	2/186 (20 overs)	Sydney Thunder	University of Tasmania Stadium	24 October 2021
Perth Scorchers	2/184 (20 overs)	Sydney Thunder	Karen Rolton Oval	11 November 2021

- Source: CricInfo

=== Most runs ===
The Golden Bat award was introduced to the league in WBBL|07. Having already been added as a feature of the BBL in 2019–20, the award recognises the leading run-scorer of the tournament, with the top-ranked player at any given time wearing a distinctive gold-coloured cap rather than their official franchise headwear.

Player	Team	Runs
Beth Mooney	Perth Scorchers	547
Katie Mack	Adelaide Strikers	513
Sophie Devine	Perth Scorchers	442
Elyse Villani	Melbourne Stars	439
Georgia Redmayne	Brisbane Heat	437

- Source: CricInfo

=== Most wickets ===
The Golden Arm award was introduced to the league in WBBL|07. Having already been added as a feature of the BBL in 2019–20, the award recognises the leading wicket-taker of the tournament, with the top-ranked player at any given time wearing a distinctive gold-coloured cap rather than their official franchise headwear.

Player	Team	Wickets
Amanda-Jade Wellington	Adelaide Strikers	23
Jess Jonassen	Brisbane Heat	21
Darcie Brown	Adelaide Strikers	20
Heather Graham	Perth Scorchers	18
Lilly Mills	Perth Scorchers	16

- Source: CricInfo

== Awards ==
=== Player of the tournament ===
Player of the Tournament votes are awarded on a 3-2-1 basis by the two standing umpires at the conclusion of every match, meaning a player can receive a maximum of six votes per game.

Pos.	Player	Team	Votes
1st	Harmanpreet Kaur	Melbourne Renegades	31
=2nd	Sophie Devine	Perth Scorchers	28
=2nd	Beth Mooney	Perth Scorchers	28
4th	Grace Harris	Brisbane Heat	25
=5th	Georgia Redmayne	Brisbane Heat	24
=5th	Mignon du Preez	Hobart Hurricanes	24

=== Team of the tournament ===
The selection panel for the Team of the Tournament was made up of former players Lisa Sthalekar (Seven Network) and Mel Jones (Fox Cricket), cricket.com.au journalist Laura Jolly and national selector Shawn Flegler. The team is intended to mimic regular WBBL conditions such as a maximum of three overseas players, a realistic mix of batters and bowlers, as well as a captain, wicket-keeper and coach.

- Beth Mooney (Perth Scorchers)
- Sophie Devine (Perth Scorchers) – captain
- Georgia Redmayne (Brisbane Heat) – wicket-keeper
- Harmanpreet Kaur (Melbourne Renegades)
- Grace Harris (Brisbane Heat)
- Tahlia McGrath (Adelaide Strikers)
- Amanda-Jade Wellington (Adelaide Strikers)
- Jess Jonassen (Brisbane Heat)
- Hannah Darlington (Sydney Thunder)
- Darcie Brown (Adelaide Strikers)
- Tayla Vlaeminck (Hobart Hurricanes)
- Simon Helmot (Melbourne Renegades) – coach

=== Young gun award ===
Players under 21 years of age at the start of the season were eligible for the Young Gun Award. The winner was chosen by national selector Shawn Flegler.

Sydney Thunder batter Phoebe Litchfield was named the Young Gun for WBBL|07, having scored 263 runs during the season at an average of 21.91 and a strike rate of 109.12.

=== Most valuable players ===
Each team designated an award to adjudge and recognise their most outstanding contributor for the season.

- Adelaide Strikers: Katie Mack
- Brisbane Heat: Grace Harris
- Hobart Hurricanes: Tayla Vlaeminck
- Melbourne Renegades: Harmanpreet Kaur
- Melbourne Stars: Kim Garth
- Perth Scorchers: Sophie Devine
- Sydney Sixers: Nicole Bolton
- Sydney Thunder: Smriti Mandhana

== See also ==
- 2021–22 Big Bash League season
