= 2021–22 Melbourne Stars WBBL season =

Australian cricket team season

Melbourne Stars
2021–22 season
- Melbourne Stars 2021–22 cap logo
- Coach: Jarrad Loughman
- Captain(s): Meg Lanning
- Home ground: N/A
- League: WBBL
- Record: 5–7 (5th)
- Finals: Did not qualify
- Leading Run Scorer: Elyse Villani – 439
- Leading Wicket Taker: Kim Garth – 15
- Player of the Season: Kim Garth

The 2021–22 Melbourne Stars Women's season was the seventh in the team's history. Coached by Jarrad Loughman and captained by Meg Lanning, the Stars were not scheduled to play any WBBL|07 games in their home state of Victoria due to ongoing border restrictions related to the COVID-19 pandemic. They finished the regular season in fifth place on the ladder, failing to qualify for the knockout stage of the tournament.

== Squad ==
Each 2021–22 squad was made up of 15 active players. Teams could sign up to five 'marquee players', with a maximum of three of those from overseas. Marquees were classed as any overseas player, or a local player who holds a Cricket Australia national contract at the start of the WBBL|07 signing period.

Personnel changes made ahead of the season included:

- English marquees Katherine Brunt and Nat Sciver did not re-sign with the Stars in anticipation of a clashing schedule with national team duties.
- South African marquee Mignon du Preez departed the Stars, signing with the Hobart Hurricanes.
- Irish marquee Kim Garth signed with the Stars, having previously played in the league for the Sydney Sixers and Perth Scorchers.
- English marquees Maia Bouchier and Linsey Smith signed with the Stars, marking their first appearances in the league.
- Holly Ferling departed the Stars, signing with the Melbourne Renegades.
- Alana King departed the Stars, signing with the Perth Scorchers.
- Maddy Darke signed with the Stars, departing the Sydney Sixers.
- Jarrad Loughman was appointed head coach, replacing Trent Woodhill.

The table below lists the Stars players and their key stats (including runs scored, batting strike rate, wickets taken, economy rate, catches and stumpings) for the season.

No.	Name	Nat.	Birth date	Batting style	Bowling style	G	R	SR	W	E	C	S	Notes
Batters
14	Maia Bouchier	(England)	5 December 1998	Right-handed	Right-arm medium	12	185	95.36	–	–	3	–	Overseas marquee
9	Anna Lanning	(Australia)	25 March 1994	Right-handed	Right-arm medium	5	3	30.00	0	6.00	1	–	
7	Meg Lanning	(Australia)	25 March 1992	Right-handed	Right-arm medium	12	250	104.16	–	–	3	–	Captain, Australian marquee
2	Elyse Villani	(Australia)	6 October 1989	Right-handed	Right-arm medium	12	439	122.28	–	–	2	–	
All-rounders
24	Lucy Cripps	(Australia)	6 December 2001	Right-handed	Right-arm medium	1	–	–	0	12.50	0	–	
16	Georgia Gall	(Australia)	30 July 2004	Left-handed	Left-arm medium fast	–	–	–	–	–	–	–	
34	Kim Garth	(Republic of Ireland)	25 April 1996	Right-handed	Right-arm medium fast	12	164	106.49	15	6.24	5	–	Overseas marquee
11	Rhys McKenna	(Australia)	17 August 2004	Right-handed	Left-arm medium fast	8	10	100.00	3	7.83	1	–	
76	Erin Osborne	(Australia)	27 June 1989	Right-handed	Right-arm off spin	9	45	63.38	3	6.82	1	–	
3	Annabel Sutherland	(Australia)	12 October 2001	Right-handed	Right-arm medium fast	12	143	82.65	14	6.42	4	–	Australian marquee
Wicket-keepers
17	Maddy Darke	(Australia)	30 March 2001	Right-handed	Right-arm off spin	4	7	116.66	–	–	1	–	
4	Nicole Faltum	(Australia)	17 January 2000	Right-handed	–	12	17	62.96	–	–	3	2	
Bowlers
6	Sophie Day	(Australia)	2 September 1998	Left-handed	Left-arm orthodox spin	10	14	93.33	4	7.55	2	–	
25	Tess Flintoff	(Australia)	31 March 2003	Right-handed	Right-arm medium fast	12	43	93.47	9	7.02	2	–	
50	Linsey Smith	(England)	10 March 1995	Left-handed	Left-arm orthodox spin	11	18	78.26	6	5.80	5	–	Overseas marquee

== Ladder ==
Pos	Team	Pld	W	L	NR	Pts	NRR
1	Perth Scorchers (C)	14	9	3	2	20	0.649
2	Melbourne Renegades (CF)	14	8	4	2	18	−0.149
3	Brisbane Heat (EF)	14	8	5	1	17	0.517
4	Adelaide Strikers (RU)	14	7	6	1	15	0.707
5	Melbourne Stars	14	5	7	2	12	−0.385
6	Hobart Hurricanes	14	5	8	1	11	−0.258
7	Sydney Thunder	14	4	8	2	10	−0.301
8	Sydney Sixers	14	4	9	1	9	−0.704

Source: cricket.com.au, ESPN Cricinfo
- The top 4 teams advanced to the play-off phase

== Fixtures ==
All times are local

Match 1
14 October 2021
19:40 (N)
Scorecard

Melbourne Stars; 1/99 (11 overs)	v	Sydney Sixers; 4/100 (10.2 overs)
Elyse Villani 54* (31)		Alyssa Healy 57 (27); Rhys McKenna 1/9 (1 over)

Sydney Sixers won by 6 wickets (with 4 balls remaining)
Blundstone Arena, Hobart
Umpires: Roberto Howard and David Taylor
Player of the match: Alyssa Healy (Sydney Sixers)

- Sydney Sixers won the toss and elected to field.
- The match was reduced to 11 overs per side due to rain.
- Broadcast by Seven Network and Foxtel

Match 6
19 October 2021
13:25
Scorecard

Hobart Hurricanes; 4/152 (20 overs)	v	Melbourne Stars; 89 (19.2 overs)
Rachel Priest 107* (68); Annabel Sutherland 2/22 (4 overs)		Meg Lanning 25 (28); Ruth Johnston 4/8 (3.2 overs)

Hobart Hurricanes won by 63 runs
Blundstone Arena, Hobart
Umpires: Simon Lightbody and Mattis van Eck
Player of the match: Rachel Priest (Hobart Hurricanes)

- Melbourne Stars won the toss and elected to field.
- Broadcast by Cricket Network and Foxtel

Match 9
20 October 2021
16:50 (D/N)
Scorecard

Melbourne Stars; 3/139 (20 overs)	v	Sydney Sixers; 8/109 (20 overs)
Annabel Sutherland 57 (50); Ashleigh Gardner 2/16 (4 overs)		Ellyse Perry 40 (43); Kim Garth 3/17 (4 overs)

Melbourne Stars won by 30 runs
Blundstone Arena, Hobart
Umpires: Roberto Howard and Mattis van Eck
Player of the match: Annabel Sutherland (Melbourne Stars)

- Sydney Sixers won the toss and elected to field.
- Broadcast by Cricket Network and Foxtel

Match 11
23 October 2021
14:00
Scorecard

Melbourne Stars	v	Brisbane Heat

Match abandoned
Invermay Park, Launceston
Umpires: Andrew Crozier and Mattis van Eck

- No toss
- No play was possible due to rain.
- Broadcast by Cricket Network and Foxtel

Match 17
26 October 2021
13:25
Scorecard

Melbourne Stars; 7/108 (20 overs)	v	Sydney Thunder; 5/96 (20 overs)
Elyse Villani 52 (63); Issy Wong 2/19 (4 overs)		Deepti Sharma 44* (48); Kim Garth 3/11 (4 overs)

Melbourne Stars won by 12 runs
University of Tasmania Stadium, Launceston
Umpires: Andrew Crozier and David Taylor
Player of the match: Kim Garth (Melbourne Stars)

- Melbourne Stars won the toss and elected to bat.
- Broadcast by Cricket Network and Foxtel

Match 20
27 October 2021
16:50 (D/N)
Scorecard

Melbourne Stars; 4/144 (20 overs)	v	Hobart Hurricanes; 4/147 (19.2 overs)
Kim Garth 44* (29); Tayla Vlaeminck 3/27 (4 overs)		Mignon du Preez 62 (45); Sophie Day 1/17 (2 overs)

Hobart Hurricanes won by 6 wickets (with 4 balls remaining)
University of Tasmania Stadium, Launceston
Umpires: Simon Lightbody and Claire Polosak
Player of the match: Mignon du Preez (Hobart Hurricanes)

- Hobart Hurricanes won the toss and elected to field.
- Broadcast by Cricket Network and Foxtel

Match 22
30 October 2021
16:05 (D/N)
Scorecard

Sydney Thunder; 5/133 (20 overs)	v	Melbourne Stars; 8/114 (20 overs)
Tahlia Wilson 53 (53); Erin Osborne 2/25 (4 overs)		Elyse Villani 38 (31); Deepti Sharma 3/25 (4 overs)

Sydney Thunder won by 19 runs
University of Tasmania Stadium, Launceston
Umpires: Roberto Howard and Jeremiah Matibiri
Player of the match: Samantha Bates (Sydney Thunder)

- Sydney Thunder won the toss and elected to bat.
- Broadcast by Cricket Network and Foxtel

Match 27
31 October 2021
13:40
Scorecard

Brisbane Heat; 9/95 (20 overs)	v	Melbourne Stars; 2/99 (16.4 overs)
Grace Harris 28 (23); Annabel Sutherland 3/21 (4 overs)		Maia Bouchier 32* (34); Nicola Hancock 1/14 (3 overs)

Melbourne Stars won by 8 wickets (with 20 balls remaining)
University of Tasmania Stadium, Launceston
Umpires: Andrew Crozier and David Taylor
Player of the match: Tess Flintoff (Melbourne Stars)

- Brisbane Heat won the toss and elected to bat.
- Broadcast by Seven Network and Foxtel

Match 32
6 November 2021
13:10
Scorecard

Melbourne Stars; 4/126 (14 overs)	v	Adelaide Strikers; 8/89 (14 overs)
Meg Lanning 82 (45); Dane van Niekerk 2/15 (2 overs)		Katie Mack 14* (8); Rhys McKenna 2/3 (1 over)

Melbourne Stars won by 37 runs
Karen Rolton Oval, Adelaide
Umpires: Simon Lightbody and David Taylor
Player of the match: Meg Lanning (Melbourne Stars)

- Adelaide Strikers won the toss and elected to field.
- The match was reduced to 14 overs per side due to rain.
- Broadcast by Cricket Network and Foxtel

Match 35
7 November 2021
13:10
Scorecard

Melbourne Stars; 103 (20 overs)	v	Melbourne Renegades; 3/104 (14.1 overs)
Kim Garth 32 (24); Harmanpreet Kaur 3/22 (4 overs)		Jemimah Rodrigues 45 (38); Kim Garth 2/23 (4 overs)

Melbourne Renegades won by 7 wickets (with 35 balls remaining)
Adelaide Oval, Adelaide
Umpires: Simon Lightbody and Eloise Sheridan
Player of the match: Sophie Molineux (Melbourne Renegades)

- Melbourne Stars won the toss and elected to bat.
- Broadcast by Seven Network and Foxtel

Match 39
10 November 2021
12:55
Scorecard

Melbourne Stars; 9/97 (20 overs)	v	Perth Scorchers; 0/98 (10.5 overs)
Kim Garth 31 (31); Sophie Devine 2/11 (3 overs)		Beth Mooney 57* (38)

Perth Scorchers won by 10 wickets (with 55 balls remaining)
Karen Rolton Oval, Adelaide
Umpires: D Bhatt and Simon Lightbody
Player of the match: Sophie Devine (Perth Scorchers)

- Melbourne Stars won the toss and elected to bat.
- Broadcast by Cricket Network and Foxtel

Match 42
11 November 2021
16:20 (D/N)
Scorecard

Melbourne Renegades	v	Melbourne Stars

Match abandoned
Karen Rolton Oval, Adelaide
Umpires: Eloise Sheridan and David Taylor

- No toss
- No play was possible due to rain.
- Broadcast by Cricket Network and Foxtel

Match 51
20 November 2021
09:45
Scorecard

Melbourne Stars; 7/122 (20 overs)	v	Perth Scorchers; 6/123 (20 overs)
Elyse Villani 84 (66); Heather Graham 3/16 (4 overs)		Mathilda Carmichael 30 (20); Annabel Sutherland 2/20 (4 overs)

Perth Scorchers won by 4 wickets (with 0 balls remaining)
Adelaide Oval, Adelaide
Umpires: Claire Polosak and Eloise Sheridan
Player of the match: Heather Graham (Perth Scorchers)

- Perth Scorchers won the toss and elected to field.
- Broadcast by Seven Network and Foxtel
- Melbourne Stars were eliminated from finals contention.

Match 56
21 November 2021
13:10
Scorecard

Adelaide Strikers; 3/175 (20 overs)	v	Melbourne Stars; 1/181 (19.3 overs)
Katie Mack 89* (67); Annabel Sutherland 2/33 (4 overs)		Elyse Villani 100* (65); Megan Schutt 1/20 (4 overs)

Melbourne Stars won by 9 wickets (with 3 balls remaining)
Adelaide Oval, Adelaide
Umpires: Shawn Craig and Claire Polosak
Player of the match: Elyse Villani (Melbourne Stars)

- Adelaide Strikers won the toss and elected to bat.
- Broadcast by Seven Network and Foxtel
- Former Australian player Erin Osborne made her last WBBL appearance.

== Statistics and awards ==
- Most runs: Elyse Villani – 439 (4th in the league)
- Highest score in an innings: Elyse Villani – 100* (65) vs Adelaide Strikers, 21 November
- Most wickets: Kim Garth – 15 (equal 9th in the league)
- Best bowling figures in an innings: Kim Garth – 3/11 (4 overs) vs Sydney Thunder, 26 October
- Most catches (fielder): Kim Garth, Linsey Smith – 5 each (equal 16th in the league)
- Player of the Match awards: Tess Flintoff, Kim Garth, Meg Lanning, Annabel Sutherland, Elyse Villani – 1 each
- Stars Player of the Season: Kim Garth
