= Ellie Johnston =

Ellie Johnston may refer to:

- Ellie Johnston (rugby league)
- Ellie Johnston (cricketer)
