= Flegler =

Flegler is a surname. Notable people with the surname include:

- Shawn Flegler (born 1972), Australian cricketer
- Thomas Flegler (born 1999), Australian rugby league footballer
