= Ellie Johnston (cricketer) =

Australian cricketer

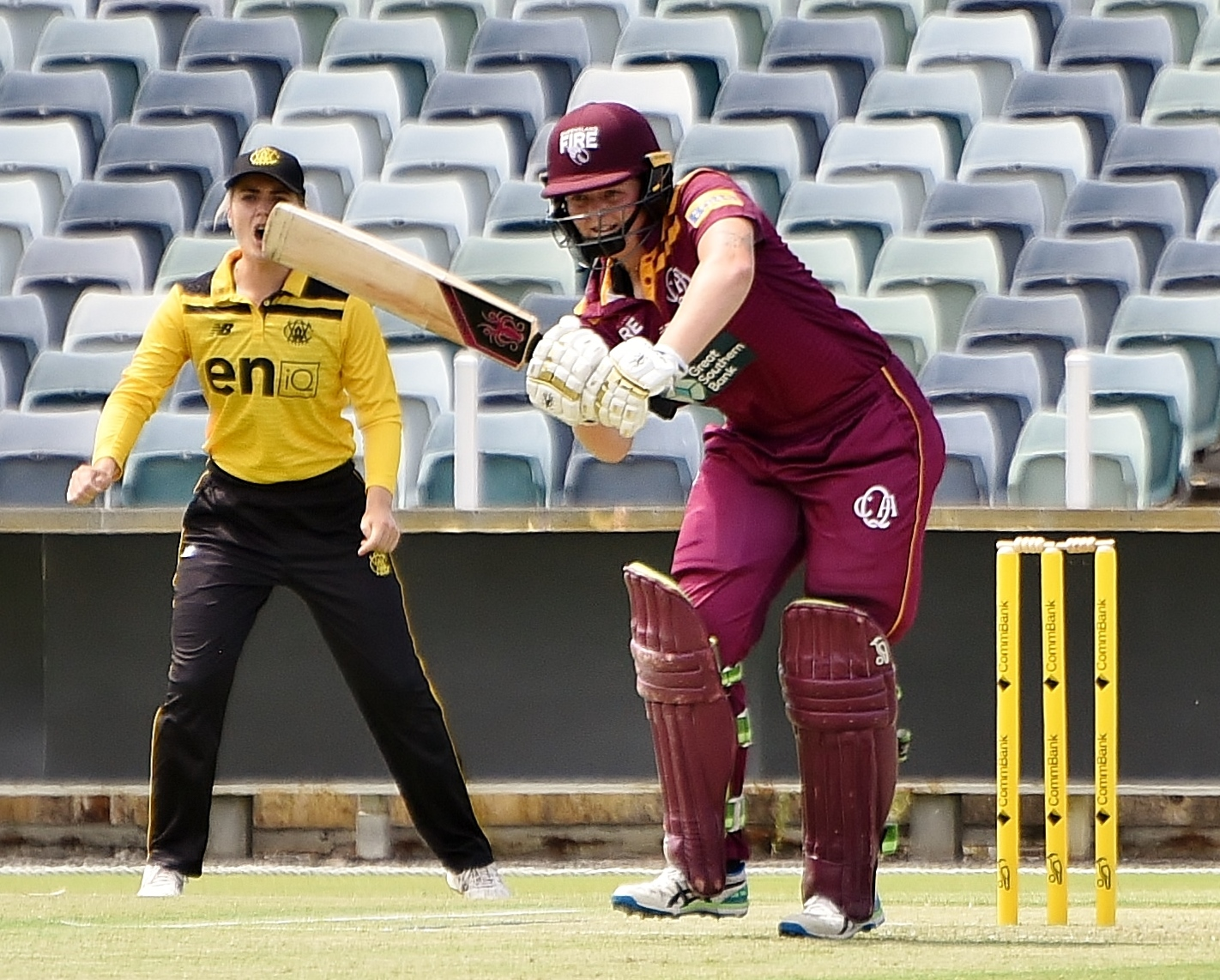
- Johnston batting for Queensland in December 2022

Personal information
- Full name: Ellie Renee Johnston
- Born: 29 January 2003 (age 23)
- Batting: Right-handed
- Bowling: Right-arm leg break
- Role: Wicket-keeper-batter
- Relatives: Ruth Johnston (cousin)

Domestic team information
- Years: Team
- 2020/21–2022/23: Queensland
- 2021/22–2023/24: Brisbane Heat (squad no. 77)
- 2024/25–present: South Australia (squad no. 77)
- 2024/25–present: Adelaide Strikers (squad no. 77)

Career statistics
Competition	WLA	WT20
Matches	30	17
Runs scored	394	174
Batting average	18.76	13.38
100s/50s	0/1	0/1
Top score	65*	54
Balls bowled	12	–
Wickets	0	–
Bowling average	–	–
5 wickets in innings	0	–
10 wickets in match	0	–
Best bowling	–	–
Catches/stumpings	17/0	3/0
- Source: CricketArchive, 20 October 2024

Ellie Renee Johnston (born 29 January 2003) is an Australian cricketer who plays for South Australia in the Women's National Cricket League (WNCL) and Adelaide Strikers in the Women's Big Bash League (WBBL). A wicket-keeper-batter, she bats right-handed and bowls right-arm leg spin. She is the cousin of Queensland player all-rounder Ruth Johnston.

== Career ==
Johnston made her professional debut in a WNCL match for Queensland against South Australia on 20 February 2021. On 24 October 2021, she made her Twenty20 debut for the Brisbane Heat against the Adelaide Strikers.
