= Lilly Mills =

Australian cricketer (born 2001)

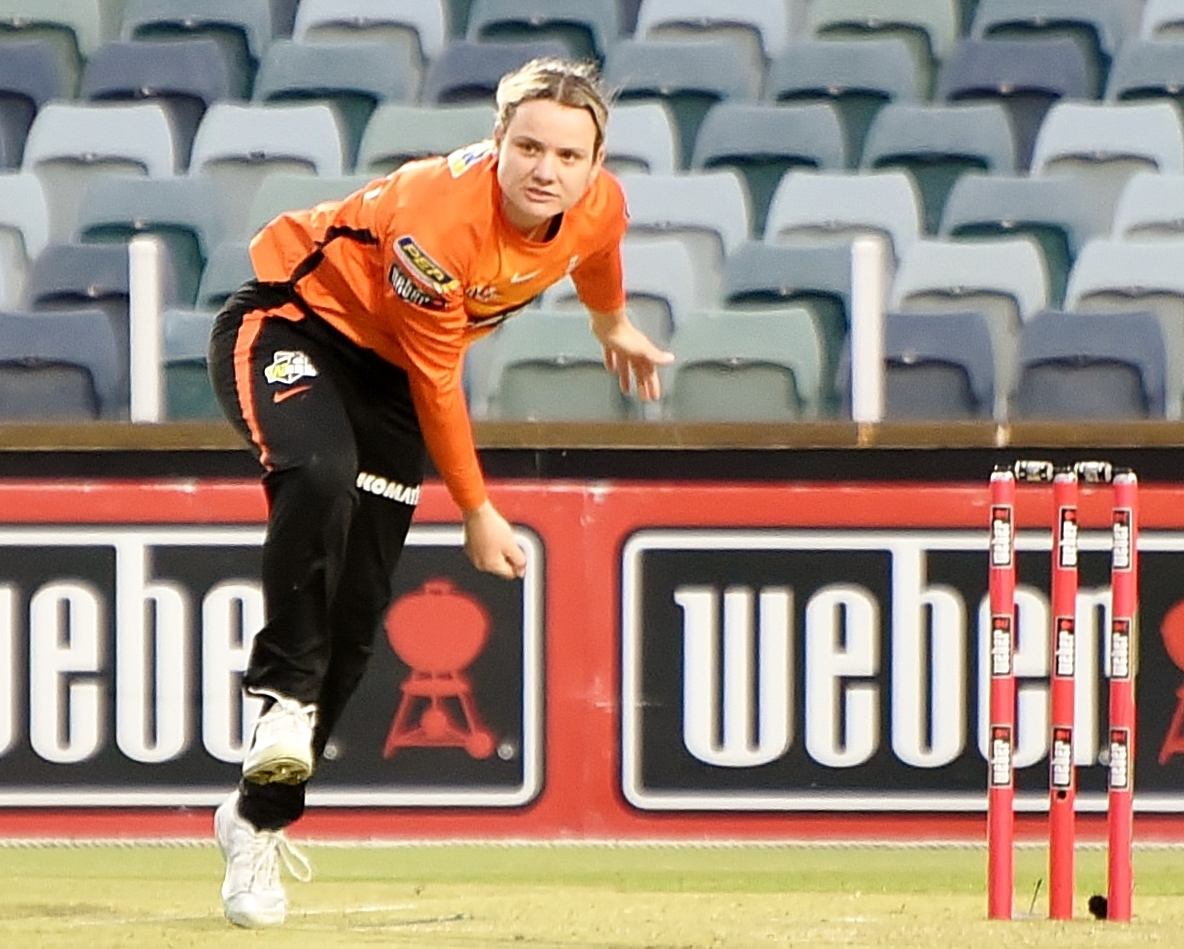
- Mills bowling for Perth Scorchers in October 2022

Personal information
- Born: 2 January 2001 (age 25)
- Batting: Right-handed
- Bowling: Right-arm off break
- Role: All-rounder

Domestic team information
- Years: Team
- 2019/20–2021/22: Queensland
- 2019/20–2020/21: Brisbane Heat
- 2021/22–present: Perth Scorchers
- 2022/23–present: Western Australia

Career statistics
Competition	WLA	WT20
Matches	31	45
Runs scored	124	60
Batting average	–	–
100s/50s	0/0	0/0
Top score	19*	15*
Balls bowled	1,528	665
Wickets	52	38
Bowling average	23.08	22.37
5 wickets in innings	2	0
10 wickets in match	0	0
Best bowling	5/36	4/25
Catches/stumpings	0/–	1/–
- Source: CricketArchive, 28 March 2021

Lilly Mills (born 2 January 2001) is an Australian cricketer who plays as an off spin bowler for Western Australia in the Women's National Cricket League (WNCL) and Perth Scorchers in the Women's Big Bash League (WBBL).

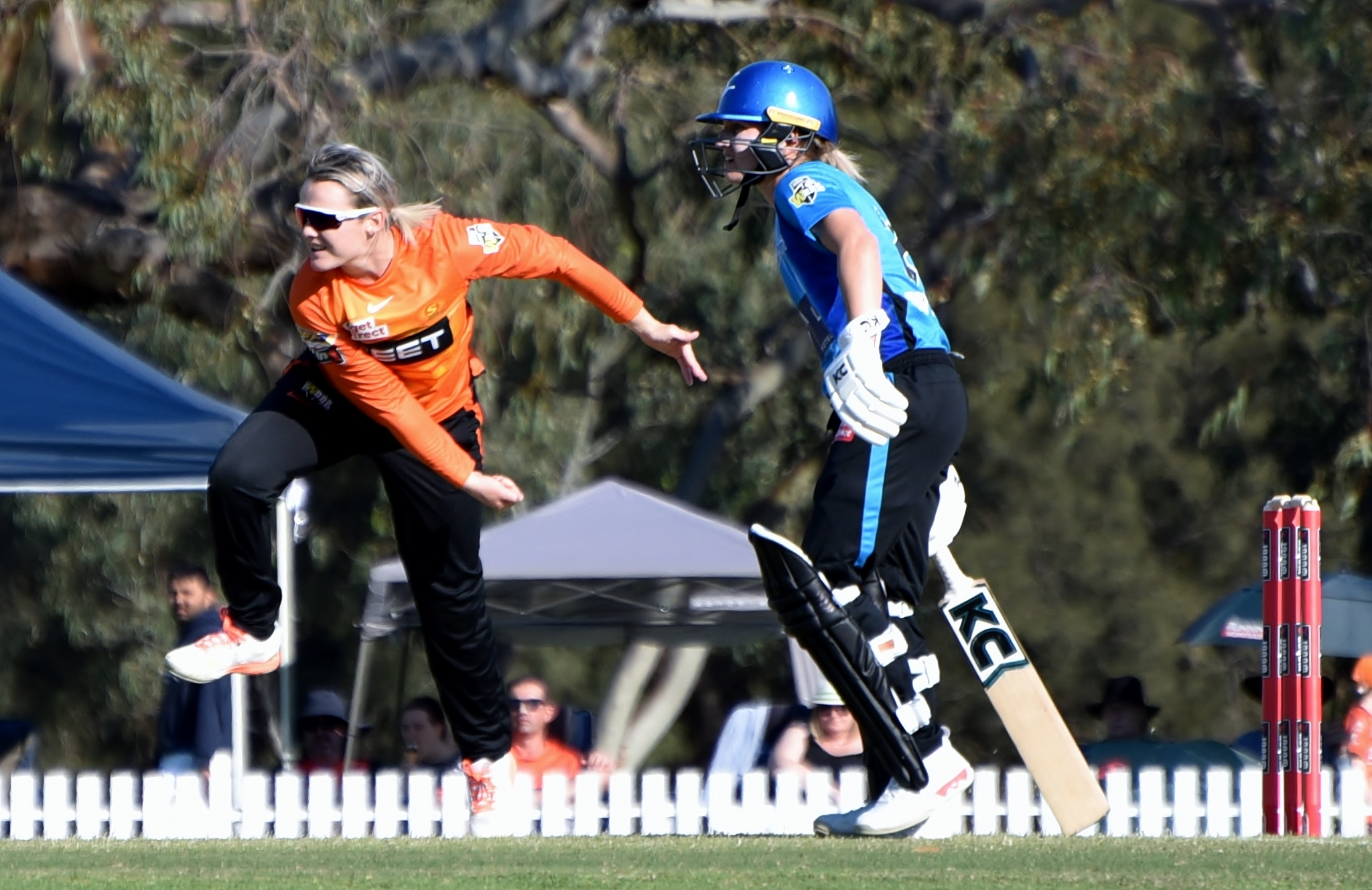
Mills bowling for Perth Scorchers during WBBL|07

Mills played in one match for Brisbane Heat in the 2019–20 Women's Big Bash League season. Her opportunities with the Heat were limited, as the team had a strong list of spin bowlers. She made her debut for Queensland against NSW at the end of the 2020–21 season, when Queensland captain Jess Jonassen left for Australia's tour of New Zealand. A week later, she took 3/36, including the key wicket of Elyse Villani, in the final against Victoria.

In her subsequent debut for the Scorchers against the Heat on 17 October 2021, Mills took another key wicket by bowling Jonassen, and also dismissed Mikayla Hinkley. The Scorchers' captain, Sophie Devine, then entrusted Mills with bowling the final over of the Heat's innings. During that over, Mills took a further wicket to finish with 3/28, and the Heat was only able to tie the score. The Scorchers then prevailed in the Super Over tiebreaker.
