= Ruth Johnston =

Australian cricketer

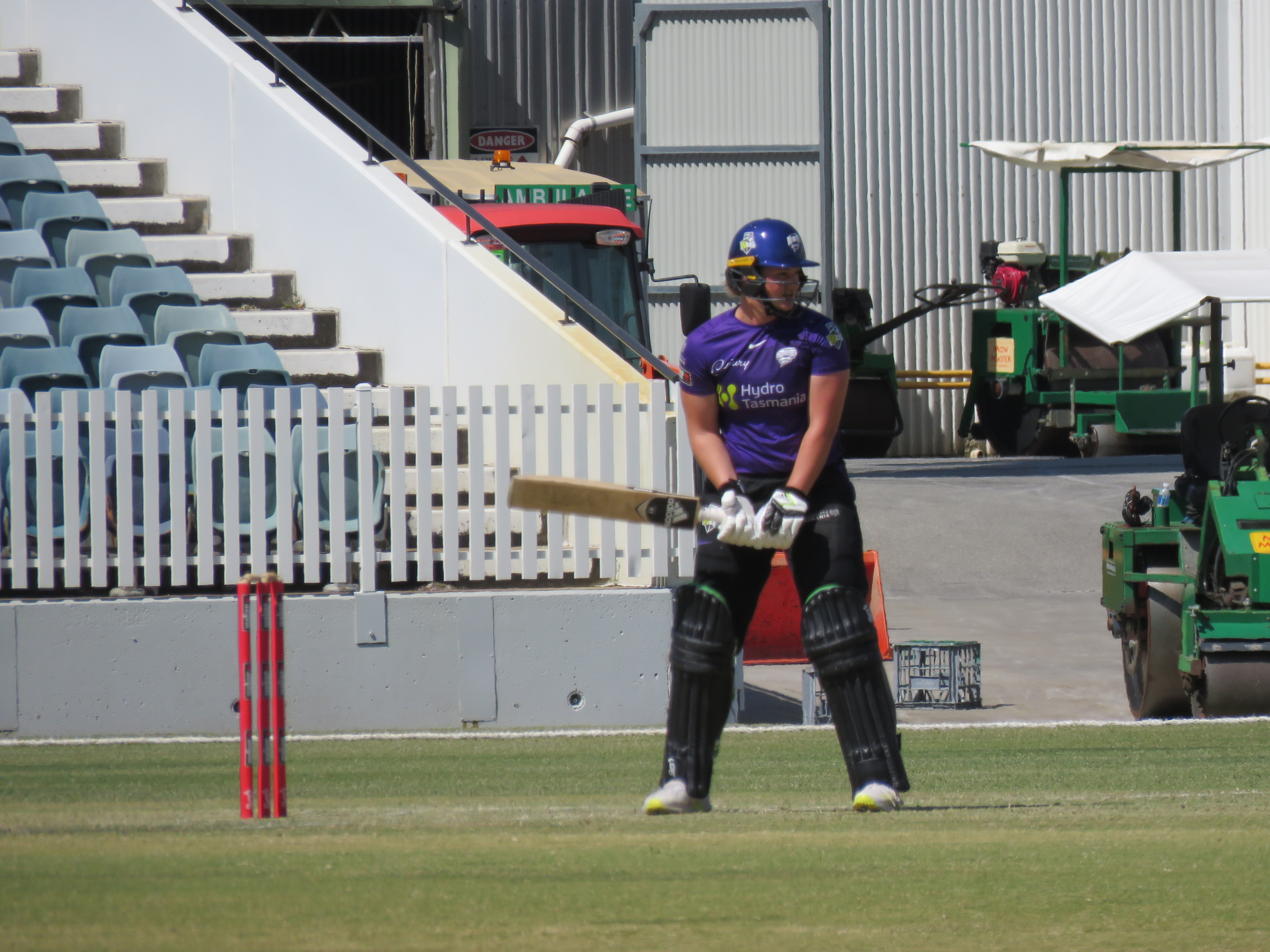
- Ruth Johnston batting against the Perth Scorchers at the WACA during WBBL|07

Personal information
- Full name: Ruth Johnston
- Born: 28 February 2003 (age 23)
- Batting: Right-handed
- Bowling: Right-arm off break
- Role: All-rounder
- Relatives: Ellie Johnston (cousin)

Domestic team information
- Years: Team
- 2020/21–present: Queensland
- 2021/22–present: Hobart Hurricanes

Career statistics
Competition	WLA	WT20
Matches	16	48
Runs scored	136	501
Batting average	10.46	13.91
100s/50s	0/0	0/2
Top score	35	63
Balls bowled	342	430
Wickets	8	23
Bowling average	345.50	20.34
5 wickets in innings	0	0
10 wickets in match	0	0
Best bowling	2–15	4–8
Catches/stumpings	5/–	12/–
- Source: , 19 February 2025

Ruth Johnston (born 28 February 2003) is an Australian cricketer who plays for Queensland Fire in the Women's National Cricket League (WNCL) and Hobart Hurricanes in the Women's Big Bash League (WBBL). An all-rounder, she bats right-handed and bowls right-arm off break. Johnston was called up to the Queensland squad during the 2020–21 WNCL, and while she did not play she was signed on a full contract ahead of the following season. She was signed by Hobart Hurricanes for the 2021–22 WBBL and made her debut in the side's opening game, a 6-wicket loss to Melbourne Renegades in which she scored 20 runs opening the batting. She is the cousin of her Queensland teammate Ellie Johnston.
