= Shawn Flegler =

Australian cricketer

Personal information
- Full name: Shawn Leonard Flegler
- Born: 23 March 1972 (age 54); Darwin, Northern Territory, Australia
- Batting: Left-handed
- Bowling: Slow left-arm orthodox
- Role: All-rounder

Domestic team information
- Years: Team
- 1994/95: Queensland
- 1997/98–1999/00: Victoria

Career statistics
Competition	First-class	List A
Matches	3	16
Runs scored	60	54
Batting average	10.00	10.80
100s/50s	0/0	0/0
Top score	16	23*
Balls bowled	342	412
Wickets	0	9
Bowling average	–	45.77
5 wickets in innings	–	0
10 wickets in match	–	0
Best bowling	–	3/21
Catches/stumpings	0/–	4/–
- Source: CricketArchive, 10 November 2012

Shawn Leonard Flegler (born 23 March 1972) is a former Australian cricketer who played domestically for Queensland and Victoria during the 1990s.

Born in Darwin, Northern Territory, Flegler grew up in Queensland, and played for the state at under-17, under-19, colts, and second XI level, as well as attending the Australian Cricket Academy. He made his first-class debut during the 1994–95 Sheffield Shield, playing for Queensland against New South Wales in November 1994 in what was to be his only appearance for the state team. Playing as an all-rounder who bowled slow left-arm orthodox spin, Flegler spent the 1995 and 1996 English cricket seasons playing for the Lowerhouse Cricket Club in the Lancashire League, as the club's designated professional. He scored the most runs and took the most wickets in both of the seasons he spent at the club.

Flegler transferred to Victoria for the 1997–98 Australian cricket season, and debuted for the Victorian cricket team in the 1997–98 Mutual Mercantile Cup. Although he only played first-class matches twice, both during the 1997–98 Sheffield Shield, Flegler regularly played limited overs matches for Victoria in the 1997–98, 1998–99, and 1999–2000 seasons, including in the team that won the 1998–99 competition. His last game for the state was in December 1999, against Western Australia. At grade cricket level, Flegler continued to play for University. In 2001 and 2002, he also played several games in Canada and Ireland as the professional for the Vancouver-based North Shore Cricket Club and the Dublin-based Merrion Cricket Club.

After his retirement from playing, Flegler was recruited by Cricket Victoria as a development coach, serving variously in roles at the Cricket Victoria Academy and the Victorian High Performance Academy. Flegler was the coach of the state under-23 side in the Futures League, and was Female High Performance Manager and Chair of the Women's National Selection Panel at Cricket Australia.
