= Ashley Day (Australian cricketer) =

Australian cricketer

Personal information
- Full name: Ashley Day
- Born: 17 September 1999 (age 27); Penrith, New South Wales, Australia
- Height: 1.78 m (5 ft 10 in)
- Batting: Right-handed
- Bowling: Right-arm leg break
- Role: Batter

Domestic team information
- Years: Team
- 2018/19: Tasmania
- 2018/19: Hobart Hurricanes
- 2019/20–present: Western Australia
- 2021/22: Perth Scorchers

Career statistics
Competition	WLA	WT20
Matches	30	2
Runs scored	392	9
Batting average	14.28	9.00
100s/50s	0/0	0/0
Top score	45	9
Catches/stumpings	2/–	0/–
- Source: CricketArchive, 26 March 2021

Ashley Day (born 17 September 1999) is an Australian cricketer who plays as a right-handed batter and right-arm leg break bowler for Western Australia in the Women's National Cricket League (WNCL). She previously played for Tasmania and Hobart Hurricanes.
