= Alana King =

Australian cricketer (born 1995)

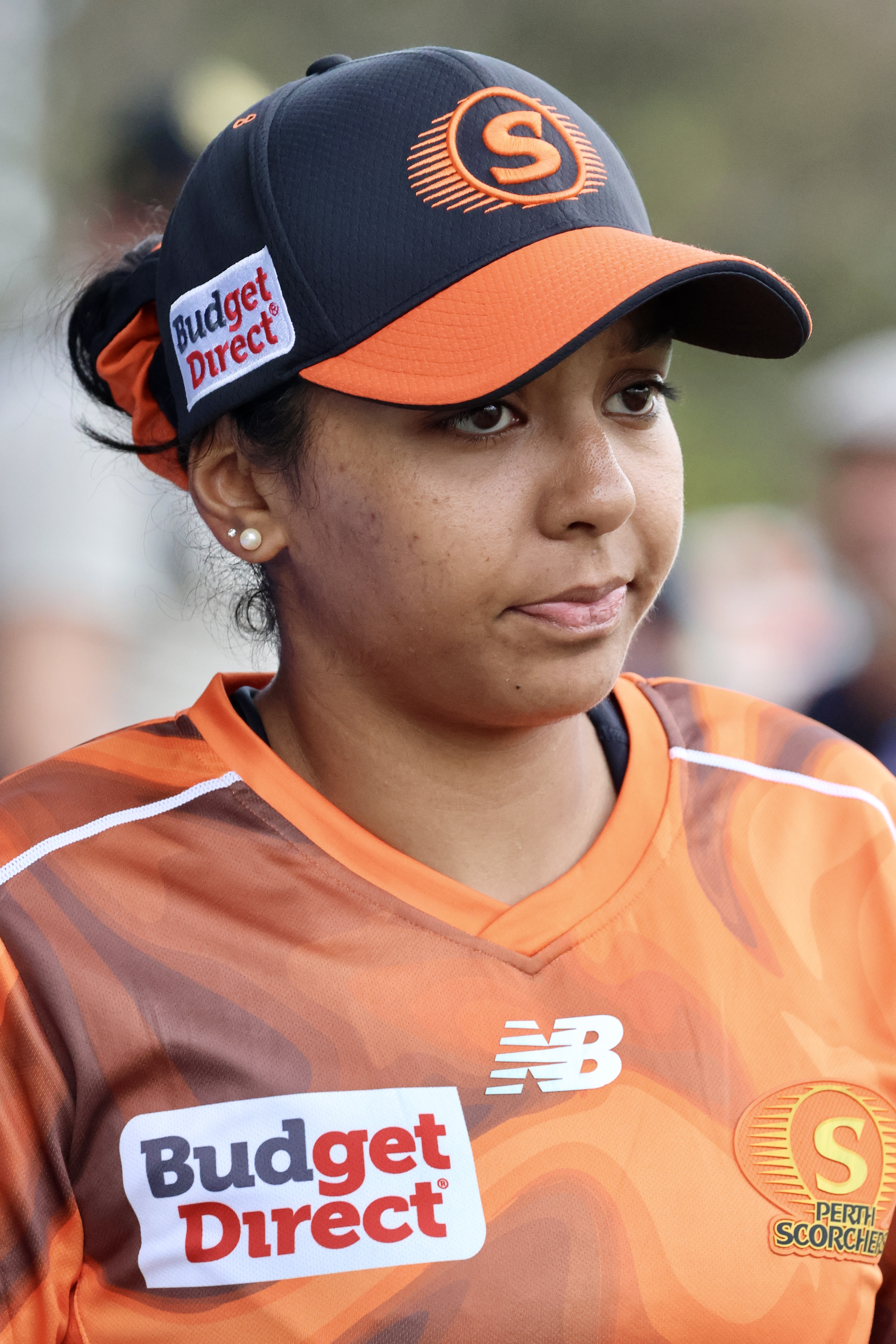
- King in 2025

Personal information
- Full name: Alana Maria King
- Born: 22 November 1995 (age 30); Clarinda, Victoria, Australia
- Height: 160 cm (5 ft 3 in)
- Batting: Right-handed
- Bowling: Right-arm leg break
- Role: Bowling all-rounder

International information
- National side: Australia (2022–present)
- Test debut (cap 181): 27 January 2022 v England
- Last Test: 30 January 2025 v England
- ODI debut (cap 147): 3 February 2022 v England
- Last ODI: 30 October 2025 v India
- ODI shirt no.: 27
- T20I debut (cap 57): 20 January 2022 v England
- Last T20I: 26 March 2025 v New Zealand
- T20I shirt no.: 27

Domestic team information
- Years: Team
- 2015/16–2020/21: Melbourne Stars
- 2016/17–2019/20: Victoria
- 2020/21–present: Western Australia
- 2021/22–present: Perth Scorchers
- 2022: Supernovas
- 2022–present: Trent Rockets
- 2025: UP Warriorz

Career statistics
Competition	WTest	WODI	WT20I	WLA
Matches	5	46	27	92
Runs scored	53	264	28	648
Batting average	8.83	18.85	14.00	16.20
100s/50s	0/0	0/1	0/0	0/1
Top score	21	51*	18*	51*
Balls bowled	774	1,850	469	3,747
Wickets	13	72	27	133
Bowling average	26.15	18.30	18.81	20.43
5 wickets in innings	1	2	0	3
10 wickets in match	0	0	0	0
Best bowling	5/53	7/18	4/8	7/18
Catches/stumpings	1/–	14/–	7/–	34/–
Medal record
Women's cricket
Representing Australia
Commonwealth Games
Gold medal – first place	2022 Birmingham
World Cup
Winner	2022 New Zealand
T20 World Cup
Winner	2023 South Africa
Winner	2026 England & Wales
- Source: CricketArchive, 29 October 2025

Alana Maria King (born 22 November 1995) is an Australian international cricketer. She also plays domestic cricket for Western Australia in the Women's National Cricket League (WNCL) and the Perth Scorchers in the Women's Big Bash League (WBBL). An all-rounder, she bowls right-arm leg spin and bats right-handed. She previously played for Victoria and Melbourne Stars.

== Early life ==
King was born on 22 November 1995 in Clarinda, Victoria. She is the daughter of Sharon and Leroy King; her parents are Anglo-Indians originally from Chennai. Her father first moved to Australia in 1984 and worked as a chef and tram driver.

King was raised in Melbourne's south-eastern suburbs and attended Our Lady of the Sacred Heart College, Bentleigh. She followed in her brother's footsteps by pursuing an interest in cricket after trying out different sports such as tennis, softball and baseball. Tennis was her first sport of choice as she took up the tennis racquet at the age of five and competed in the Tennis Victoria Pennant which was the largest tennis inter-club representative competition in Australia. She also served as a ball kid during the women's singles final of the 2011 Australian Open. She also had a brief stint with her school softball team and also turned up for Monash University Baseball Club.

== Domestic career ==
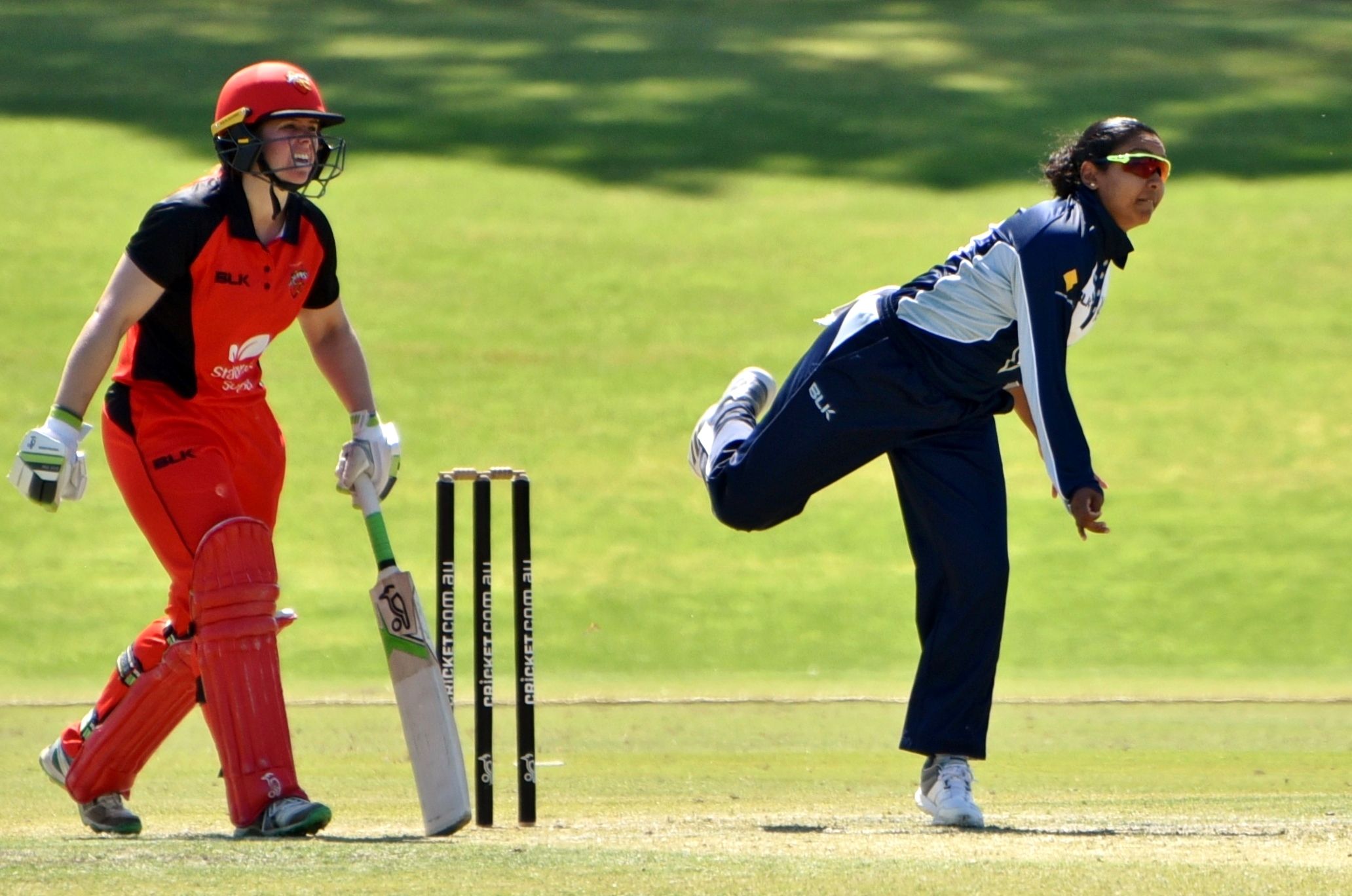
King bowling for Victoria in 2018

King was handed her first rookie contract at the age of 16 in 2012 with VicSpirit in the Women's National Cricket League and three years later down the line, she bagged a surprise call-up to Melbourne Stars for the inaugural edition of the WBBL in 2015–2016 season. She leapfrogged into the senior Victoria squad in 2016.

She also had a successful 2021–22 Women's Big Bash League season by emerging as the joint fifth highest wicket-taker in the season with 16 scalps.

In April 2022, King was bought by the Trent Rockets for the 2022 season of The Hundred in England. On 13 August 2022, during a group stage match between Trent Rockets and Manchester Originals, she claimed a hat-trick against Manchester Originals and became the first woman to take a hat-trick in The Hundred.

In the same month, during a group stage match between Oval Invincibles and Trent Rockets at the 2022 Hundred edition, King achieved a unique feat by delivering 10 consecutive dot balls to become the first player to achieve the milestone in the history of The Hundred.

In December 2024, King was bought by the UP Warriorz for the 2025 season of WPL

== International career ==
In April 2019, Cricket Australia awarded her with a contract with the National Performance Squad ahead of the 2019–20 season.

In January 2022, King was named in Australia's squad for their series against England to contest the Women's Ashes. She was included in Ashes squad as replacement to injured Georgia Wareham and Sophie Molineux but she was picked up in the squad over Amanda-Jade Wellington as a surprise package with selectors opted to leave out Amanda-Jade Wellington in order to allow her play for Australia A team. She made her Women's Twenty20 International (WT20I) debut on 20 January 2022, for Australia against England. Later the same month, she was named in Australia's team for the 2022 Women's Cricket World Cup in New Zealand.

She made her Women's Test match debut on 27 January 2022, for Australia against England in the one-off Women's Ashes Test. She made her Women's One Day International (WODI) debut on 3 February 2022, also for Australia against England in the Women's Ashes. Therefore, she earned her first cap in all three formats of international cricket in the space of fourteen days. In April 2022, she received her first contract with Cricket Australia after her splendid performances with the ball throughout the cricket summer.

She was the second highest wicket-taker for Australia during the successful 2022 World Cup campaign for the Aussies as she picked up 12 wickets in the tournament at 24.50 in nine matches including a spell of 3 for 64 against England in the all-important final. She was also the fourth joint highest wicket-taker during the tournament in what is considered to be a career defining performance for her which would later make her first-choice player in the Australian team.

In May 2022, King was named in Australia's team for the cricket tournament at the 2022 Commonwealth Games in Birmingham, England.

In January 2023, King was named in the Australian team for the 2023 Women's T20 World cup.

She was named in the Australia squad for the 2024 ICC Women's T20 World Cup and the 2025 Women's Ashes series.

She was named in the Australia squad for the 2025 Women's Cricket World Cup. On 25 October 2025, during Australia's final group stage game against South Africa, she became the first woman to take 7 wickets in a single ODI world cup match, taking 7–18. She finished the tournament with 13 wickets, and was named in the ICC team of the tournament for her performances.
