= 2017–18 Adelaide Strikers WBBL season =

Adelaide Strikers
2017–18 season
- Adelaide Strikers 2017–18 cap logo
- Coach: Andrea McCauley
- Captain(s): Suzie Bates
- Home ground: Adelaide Oval
- League: WBBL
- Record: 8–6 (4th)
- Finals: Semi-finalists
- Leading Run Scorer: Suzie Bates – 434
- Leading Wicket Taker: Devine, Wellington – 17
- Player of the Season: Sophie Devine

The 2017–18 Adelaide Strikers Women's season was the third in the team's history. Coached by Andrea McCauley and captained by Suzie Bates, the Strikers finished the regular season of WBBL|03 in fourth place. They were subsequently knocked out of the tournament via a 17-run semi-final loss to the Sydney Sixers at Adelaide Oval.

== Squad ==
Each WBBL|03 squad featured 15 active players, with an allowance of up to five marquee signings including a maximum of three from overseas. Australian marquees were defined as players who made at least ten limited-overs appearances for the national team in the three years prior to the cut-off date (24 April 2017).

Personnel changes made ahead of the season included:

- New Zealand marquee Suzie Bates signed with the Strikers, departing the Perth Scorchers. Bates was also appointed captain of the team, taking over the role from Tegan McPharlin (3–9 win–loss record).
- Sarah Coyte departed the Strikers, initially retiring from cricket before returning later in the season with the Sydney Sixers.
- England marquee Charlotte Edwards retired from cricket after WBBL|02 and took on assistant coaching role for the team.
- Former Australian players Sarah Elliott and Shelley Nitschke also retired from cricket after WBBL|02.
- Rhiannon Dick signed with the Strikers, departing the Sydney Sixers.

The table below lists the Strikers players and their key stats (including runs scored, batting strike rate, wickets taken, economy rate, catches and stumpings) for the season.

No.	Name	Nat.	Birth date	Batting style	Bowling style	G	R	SR	W	E	C	S	Notes
Batters
11	Suzie Bates	(New Zealand)	16 September 1987	Right-handed	Right-arm medium	15	434	109.59	7	7.70	12	–	Captain, overseas marquee
2	Tammy Beaumont	(England)	11 March 1991	Right-handed	–	15	301	90.39	–	–	2	–	Overseas marquee
5	Annie O'Neil	(Australia)	18 February 1999	Right-handed	Right-arm leg spin	–	–	–	–	–	–	–	
21	Bridget Patterson	(Australia)	4 December 1994	Right-handed	Right-arm medium	15	213	109.79	–	–	3	–	
13	Tabatha Saville	(Australia)	13 April 1998	Right-handed	Right-arm off spin	15	109	81.34	–	–	5	–	
All-rounders
	Kathryn Bryce	(Scotland)	17 November 1997	Right-handed	Right-arm medium	–	–	–	–	–	–	–	Associate rookie
77	Sophie Devine	(New Zealand)	1 September 1989	Right-handed	Right-arm medium	15	355	117.54	17	6.20	5	–	Overseas marquee
22	Rhiannon Dick	(Australia)	21 September 1990	Left-handed	Left-arm orthodox spin	3	6	60.00	1	8.25	1	–	
9	Tahlia McGrath	(Australia)	10 November 1995	Right-handed	Right-arm medium	15	229	106.01	13	6.12	5	–	
Wicket-keeper
7	Tegan McPharlin	(Australia)	7 August 1988	Right-handed	Right-arm medium	15	7	77.27	–	–	4	10	
Bowlers
14	Samantha Betts	(Australia)	16 February 1996	Right-handed	Right-arm medium fast	5	5	166.66	2	10.24	2	–	
3	Ellie Falconer	(Australia)	3 August 1999	Right-handed	Right-arm medium fast	–	–	–	–	–	–	–	
18	Katelyn Pope	(Australia)	29 March 1996	Right-handed	Left-arm medium	9	8	160.00	0	5.70	0	–	
12	Alex Price	(Australia)	5 November 1995	Right-handed	Right-arm off spin	13	41	97.61	7	6.16	4	–	
27	Megan Schutt	(Australia)	15 January 1993	Right-handed	Right-arm medium fast	15	91	118.18	12	5.74	2	–	Australian marquee
10	Amanda-Jade Wellington	(Australia)	29 May 1997	Right-handed	Right-arm leg spin	15	52	110.63	17	6.53	3	–	

== Ladder ==
Pos	Team	Pld	W	L	NR	Pts	NRR
1	Sydney Sixers (C)	14	10	4	0	20	0.890
2	Sydney Thunder	14	10	4	0	20	0.684
3	Perth Scorchers (RU)	14	8	6	0	16	0.266
4	Adelaide Strikers	14	8	6	0	16	0.250
5	Brisbane Heat	14	7	7	0	14	0.147
6	Melbourne Renegades	14	6	8	0	12	0.092
7	Melbourne Stars	14	5	9	0	10	−0.634
8	Hobart Hurricanes	14	2	12	0	4	−1.733

- The top four teams qualified for the play-off phase.

== Fixtures ==
All times are local time

=== Regular season ===
Match 2
9 December 2017
14:30
Scorecard

Adelaide Strikers; 3/183 (20 overs)	v	Hobart Hurricanes; 9/138 (20 overs)
Sophie Devine 46 (21); Brooke Hepburn 2/35 (4 overs)		Hayley Matthews 35 (27); Tahlia McGrath 2/15 (3 overs)

Adelaide Strikers won by 45 runs
Gliderol Stadium, Glenelg
Umpires: Steven Farrell and Luke Uthenwoldt
Player of the match: Sophie Devine (Strikers)

- Hobart Hurricanes won the toss and elected to field
- Streamed on cricket.com.au

Match 5
10 December 2017
12:30
Scorecard

Adelaide Strikers; 6/176 (20 overs)	v	Hobart Hurricanes; 93 (18.5 overs)
Suzie Bates 102 (65); Veronica Pyke 4/17 (4 overs)		Veda Krishnamurthy 21 (24); Amanda-Jade Wellington 3/9 (4 overs)

Adelaide Strikers won by 83 runs
Gliderol Stadium, Glenelg
Umpires: Craig Thomas and Luke Uthenwoldt
Player of the match: Suzie Bates (Strikers)

- Adelaide Strikers won the toss and elected to bat
- Streamed on cricket.com.au

Match 11
16 December 2017
14:00
Scorecard

Adelaide Strikers; 6/139 (20 overs)	v	Melbourne Renegades; 8/138 (20 overs)
Tammy Beaumont 45 (44); Hayley Jensen 1/17 (2 overs)		Amy Satterthwaite 56 (40); Tahlia McGrath 2/27 (4 overs)

Adelaide Strikers won by 1 run
Gliderol Stadium, Glenelg
Umpires: Craig Thomas and Luke Uthenwoldt
Player of the match: Tahlia McGrath (Strikers)

- Melbourne Renegades won the toss and elected to field
- Streamed on cricket.com.au

Match 13
17 December 2017
14:00
Scorecard

Melbourne Renegades; 5/160 (20 overs)	v	Adelaide Strikers; 9/151 (20 overs)
Amy Satterthwaite 49 (37); Sophie Devine 2/25 (4 overs)		Suzie Bates 63 (38); Lea Tahuhu 2/20 (4 overs)

Melbourne Renegades won by 9 runs
Gliderol Stadium, Glenelg
Umpires: Craig Thomas and Luke Uthenwoldt
Player of the match: Amy Satterthwaite (Renegades)

- Melbourne Renegades won the toss and elected to bat
- Streamed on cricket.com.au

Match 19
29 December 2017
14:30
Scorecard

Adelaide Strikers; 6/113 (20 overs)	v	Brisbane Heat; 1/114 (16 overs)
Bridget Patterson 32 (30); Deandra Dottin 2/13 (3 overs)		Beth Mooney 86* (57); Amanda-Jade Wellington 1/24 (4 overs)

Brisbane Heat won by 9 wickets (with 24 balls remaining)
Adelaide Oval, Adelaide
Umpires: Steven Farrell and Luke Uthenwoldt
Player of the match: Beth Mooney (Heat)

- Brisbane Heat won the toss and elected to field
- Streamed on cricket.com.au

Match 23
31 December 2017
13:45
Scorecard

Adelaide Strikers; 7/119 (20 overs)	v	Brisbane Heat; 2/122 (16.2 overs)
Bridget Patterson 37 (29); Haidee Birkett 3/15 (3 overs)		Beth Mooney 81* (48); Amanda-Jade Wellington 1/17 (3.2 overs)

Brisbane Heat won by 8 wickets (with 22 balls remaining)
Adelaide Oval, Adelaide
Umpires: Nathan Johnstone and Craig Thomas
Player of the match: Beth Mooney (Heat)

- Brisbane Heat won the toss and elected to field
- Broadcast by Network Ten

Match 26
3 January 2018
14:00
Scorecard

Adelaide Strikers; 5/144 (20 overs)	v	Melbourne Stars; 9/122 (20 overs)
Tammy Beaumont 46 (48); Georgia Elwiss 2/22 (4 overs)		Lizelle Lee 44 (42); Megan Schutt 2/23 (4 overs)

Adelaide Strikers won by 22 runs
Casey Fields No. 4, Melbourne
Umpires: Stephen Brne and Dale Ireland
Player of the match: Alex Price (Strikers)

- Melbourne Stars won the toss and elected to field
- Streamed on cricket.com.au

Match 32
6 January 2018
14:20
Scorecard

Melbourne Stars; 5/132 (20 overs)	v	Adelaide Strikers; 9/134 (20 overs)
Lizelle Lee 52 (52); Sophie Devine 2/28 (4 overs)		Tabatha Saville 28* (27); Annabel Sutherland 4/20 (4 overs)

Adelaide Strikers won by 1 wicket (with 0 balls remaining)
Adelaide Oval
Umpires: David Shepard and Craig Thomas
Player of the match: Tabatha Saville (Strikers)

- Melbourne Stars won the toss and elected to bat
- Streamed on cricket.com.au

The Strikers recorded the first-ever one-wicket victory in WBBL history, defeating the Stars on the last ball of the match. Requiring three runs with one delivery remaining, Tabatha Saville scored a boundary off leg-spinner Kristen Beams to clinch a narrow win for her team.

Match 34
13 January 2018
10:50
Scorecard

Perth Scorchers; 9/87 (16 overs)	v	Adelaide Strikers; 4/88 (15.5 overs)
Heather Graham 19 (17); Tahlia McGrath 3/17 (3 overs)		Suzie Bates 49* (47); Katherine Brunt 2/17 (4 overs)

Adelaide Strikers won by 6 wickets (with 1 ball remaining)
Traeger Park, Alice Springs
Umpires: Darren Close and Craig Thomas
Player of the match: Tahlia McGrath (Strikers)

- Adelaide Strikers won the toss and elected to field
- Match reduced to 16 overs per side due to rain delay
- Broadcast by Network Ten

Match 38
14 January 2018
16:30 (D/N)
Scorecard

Adelaide Strikers; 7/107 (20 overs)	v	Perth Scorchers; 76 (17.3 overs)
Tahlia McGrath 34 (28); Katherine Brunt 2/15 (4 overs)		Nicole Bolton 30 (38); Alex Price 2/4 (1.3 overs)

Adelaide Strikers won by 31 runs
Traeger Park, Alice Springs
Umpires: Craig Thomas and Ben Treloar
Player of the match: Tahlia McGrath (Strikers)

- Perth Scorchers won the toss and elected to field
- Streamed on cricket.com.au

Match 43
20 January 2018
14:00
Scorecard

Sydney Thunder; 4/148 (20 overs)	v	Adelaide Strikers; 111 (19.2 overs)
Rachel Priest 51 (27); Tahlia McGrath 2/16 (4 overs)		Bridget Patterson 30 (20); Samantha Bates 3/21 (4 overs)

Sydney Thunder won by 37 runs
Robertson Oval, Wagga Wagga
Umpires: Andrew Scotford and D Young
Player of the match: Rachel Priest (Thunder)

- Sydney Thunder won the toss and elected to bat
- Streamed on cricket.com.au

Match 47
21 January 2018
14:00
Scorecard

Adelaide Strikers; 5/114 (20 overs)	v	Sydney Thunder; 4/114 (20 overs)
Suzie Bates 40 (43); Rene Farrell 2/21 (4 overs)		Naomi Stalenberg 29 (24); Amanda-Jade Wellington 2/21 (4 overs)

Match Tied (Adelaide Strikers won the Super Over)
Robertson Oval, Wagga Wagga
Umpires: Andrew Scotford and D Young
Player of the match: Sophie Devine (Strikers)

- Adelaide Strikers won the toss and elected to bat
- Streamed on cricket.com.au

Match 50
27 January 2018
14:00
Scorecard

Adelaide Strikers; 4/149 (20 overs)	v	Sydney Sixers; 3/150 (19.2 overs)
Sophie Devine 70 (45); Sarah Coyte 2/14 (4 overs)		Alyssa Healy 106 (66); Megan Schutt 1/26 (4 overs)

Sydney Sixers won by 7 wickets (with 4 balls remaining)
Hurstville Oval, Sydney
Umpires: Anthony Hobson and T Penman
Player of the match: Alyssa Healy (Sixers)

- Adelaide Strikers won the toss and elected to bat
- Streamed on cricket.com.au

Match 55
28 January 2018
14:00
Scorecard

Adelaide Strikers; 9/111 (20 overs)	v	Sydney Sixers; 2/112 (18.1 overs)
Tammy Beaumont 28 (31); Sarah Coyte 3/18 (4 overs)		Alyssa Healy 63 (52); Alex Price 1/16 (2 overs)

Sydney Sixers won by 7 wickets (with 11 balls remaining)
Hurstville Oval, Sydney
Umpires: T Penman and G Stubbings
Player of the match: Sarah Coyte (Sixers)

- Adelaide Strikers won the toss and elected to bat
- Streamed on cricket.com.au

=== Knockout phase ===
Semi-final 2
2 February 2018
14:40
Scorecard

Sydney Sixers; 5/138 (20 overs)	v	Adelaide Strikers; 9/121 (20 overs)
Ashleigh Gardner 72 (45); Sophie Devine 2/21 (4 overs)		Tammy Beaumont 50 (46); Sarah Aley 4/18 (4 overs)

Sydney Sixers won by 17 runs
Adelaide Oval, Adelaide
Umpires: Michael Graham-Smith and John Ward
Player of the match: Sarah Aley (Sixers)

- Sydney Sixers won the toss and elected to bat
- Played as a double header with BBL semi-final 2
- Broadcast by Network Ten

== Statistics and awards ==
- Most runs: Suzie Bates – 434 (5th in the league)
- Highest score in an innings: Suzie Bates – 102 (65) vs Hobart Hurricanes, 10 December 2017
- Most wickets: Sophie Devine, Amanda-Jade Wellington – 17 each (equal 4th in the league)
- Best bowling figures in an innings: Amanda-Jade Wellington – 3/9 (4 overs) vs Hobart Hurricanes, 10 December 2017
- Most catches (fielder): Suzie Bates – 12 (2nd in the league)
- Player of the Match awards:
  - Tahlia McGrath – 3
  - Sophie Devine – 2
  - Suzie Bates, Alex Price, Tabatha Saville – 1 each
- Strikers Most Valuable Player: Sophie Devine
- WBBL|03 Player of the Tournament: Suzie Bates (equal 4th)
- WBBL|03 Team of the Tournament: Sophie Devine
- WBBL|03 Young Gun Award: Tabatha Saville (nominated)
