= 2016–17 Adelaide Strikers WBBL season =

Adelaide Strikers
2016–17 season
- Coach: (Australia) Andrea McCauley
- Captain(s): (Australia) Tegan McPharlin
- Home ground: Adelaide Oval
- WBBL Season: 8th
- WBBL Finals: DNQ

The 2016–17 Adelaide Strikers WBBL season was the second in the team's history. Coached by Andrea McCauley and captained by Tegan McPharlin, the team competed in the WBBL|02 tournament.

At the conclusion of the group stage, the Strikers team was last on the table, and therefore did not qualify for the knockout phase.

== Squad ==
The following is the Strikers women squad for WBBL|02. Players with international caps are listed in bold.

No.	Name	Nat.	Birth date	Batting style	Bowling style	Notes
Batsmen
2	**Tammy Beaumont**	(England)	11 March 1991 (age 34)	Right-handed		Overseas international
23	**Charlotte Edwards**	(England)	17 December 1979 (age 45)	Right-handed	Right arm leg spin	Overseas international
31	**Sarah Elliot**	(Australia)	4 January 1982 (age 43)	Right-handed	Right arm off spin	
21	Bridget Patterson	(Australia)	4 December 1994 (age 30)	Right-handed	Right-arm fast medium	
13	Tabatha Saville	(Australia)	(age 18)			
All-rounders
15	**Sarah Coyte**	(Australia)	30 March 1991 (age 34)	Right-handed	Right arm medium fast	
9	Tahlia McGrath	(Australia)	10 November 1995 (age 29)	Right-handed	Right-arm medium	
1	**Shelley Nitschke**	(Australia)	3 December 1976 (age 48)	Left-handed	Left-arm orthodox spin	Assistant coach
Wicketkeepers
7	Tegan McPharlin	(Australia)	7 August 1988 (age 37)	Right-handed	Right-arm fast medium	Captain
Pace bowlers
14	Samantha Betts	(Australia)	16 February 1996 (age 29)	Right-handed	Right-arm medium	
77	**Sophie Devine**	(New Zealand)	1 September 1989 (age 35)	Right-handed	Right-arm medium	Overseas international
18	Katelyn Pope	(Australia)	(age 20)	Right-handed	Left-arm medium	
27	**Megan Schutt**	(Australia)	15 January 1993 (age 32)	Right-handed	Right-arm medium fast	
	**Ravina Oa**	(Papua New Guinea)				Associate Rookie
Spin bowlers
12	Alex Price	(Australia)	5 November 1995 (age 29)	Right-handed	Right-arm off spin	
10	Amanda Wellington	(Australia)	29 May 1997 (age 28)	Right-handed	Right-arm leg spin	

== Ladder ==
Pos	Team	Pld	W	L	NR	Ded	Pts	NRR
1	Sydney Sixers (C)	14	9	5	0	0	18	0.442
2	Perth Scorchers (RU)	14	8	6	0	0	16	0.300
3	Brisbane Heat	14	8	6	0	0	16	0.046
4	Hobart Hurricanes	14	7	6	1	0	15	−0.034
5	Melbourne Stars	14	7	7	0	0	14	0.256
6	Sydney Thunder	14	6	7	1	0	13	−0.046
7	Melbourne Renegades	14	6	8	0	0.5	11.5	−0.519
8	Adelaide Strikers	14	3	9	2	0	8	−0.541

- The top four teams qualified for the play-off phase.

== Fixtures ==
=== Group stage ===
Match 2
10 December
13:45
Scorecard

Adelaide Strikers; 116 (19.3 overs)	v	Melbourne Renegades; 102 (19.1 overs)
Sophie Devine 43 (38); Molly Strano 3/17 (4 overs)		Sophie Molineux 37* (30); Alex Price 2/8 (1.1 overs)

Adelaide Strikers won by 14 runs
North Sydney Oval
Umpires: Simon Lightbody and Claire Polosak
Player of the match: Sophie Devine (Strikers)

- Melbourne Renegades won the toss and elected to field
- Streamed on cricket.com.au; broadcast by Network Ten

Match 4
11 December
10:00
Scorecard

Melbourne Renegades; 3/131 (19.3 overs)	v	Adelaide Strikers; 6/128 (20 overs)
Rachel Priest 44 (37); Shelley Nitschke 2/10 (4 overs)		Sophie Devine 41* (27); Sophie Molineux 4/18 (4 overs)

Melbourne Renegades won by 7 wickets (with 3 balls remaining)
North Sydney Oval No. 2
Umpires: Mark Nickl and Glen Stubbings
Player of the match: Sophie Molineux (Renegades)

- Adelaide Strikers won the toss and elected to bat
- Streamed on cricket.com.au

Match 9
16 December
14:00
Scorecard

Sydney Thunder	v	Adelaide Strikers

Match abandoned
Howell Oval, Sydney

- Persistent rain meant the match was abandoned without a ball bowled.
- Streamed on cricket.com.au

Match 12
17 December
14:00
Scorecard

Adelaide Strikers; 4/103 (17.5 overs)	v	Sydney Thunder; 5/102 (20 overs)
Sophie Devine 44 (33); Suzie Bates 2/14 (4 overs)		Rene Farrell 29* (26); Tahlia McGrath 2/21 (4 overs)

Adelaide Strikers won by 6 wickets (with 13 balls remaining)
Howell Oval, Sydney
Umpires: T Penman and Claire Polosak
Player of the match: Sophie Devine

- Sydney Thunder won the toss and elected to bat
- Streamed on cricket.com.au

Match 19
26 December
14:00
Scorecard

Adelaide Strikers; 3/146 (16.3 overs)	v	Hobart Hurricanes; 3/143 (20 overs)
Sophie Devine 103* (48); Veronica Pyke 1/21 (3 overs)		Holly Knight 69 (47); Megan Schutt 1/15 (4 overs)

Adelaide Strikers won by 7 wickets (with 21 balls remaining)
Gliderol Stadium, Adelaide
Umpires: Luke Uthenwoldt and Cain Kemp
Player of the match: Sophie Devine (Strikers)

- Adelaide Strikers won the toss and elected to field
- Streamed on cricket.com.au

Match 22
27 December
14:00
Scorecard

Hobart Hurricanes	v	Adelaide Strikers

Match abandoned
Gliderol Stadium, Adelaide

- Match was washed out, Strikers second washout for the season
- Streamed on cricket.com.au

Match 26
31 December
12:45
Scorecard

Adelaide Strikers; 9/82 (20 overs)	v	Perth Scorchers; 4/85 (15.5 overs)
Tahlia McGrath 27 (31); Heather Graham 2/12 (3 overs)		Nicole Bolton 28 (32); Megan Schutt 2/16 (3 overs)

Perth Scorchers won by 6 wickets (with 25 balls remaining)
Adelaide Oval
Umpires: Simon Lightbody and Luke Uthenwoldt
Player of the match: Katherine Brunt (Scorchers)

- Adelaide Strikers won the toss and elected to bat
- Double header with BBL game
- Streamed on cricket.com.au; broadcast by Network Ten

Match 29
2 January
12:30
Scorecard

Sydney Sixers; 3/161 (20 overs)	v	Adelaide Strikers; 5/142 (20 overs)
Alyssa Healy 51 (40); Sarah Coyte 2/34 (4 overs)		Tammy Beaumont 57 (56); Sarah Aley 1/18 (4 overs)

Sydney Sixers won by 19 runs
Adelaide Oval
Umpires: Craig Thomas and Luke Uthenwoldt
Player of the match: Alyssa Healy (Sixers)

- Sydney Sixers won the toss and elected to bat
- Streamed on cricket.com.au

Match 31
3 January
12:30
Scorecard

Adelaide Strikers; 10/94 (19.5 overs)	v	Sydney Sixers; 6/97 (17.5 overs)
Tammy Beaumont 30 (34); Lisa Sthalekar 3/12 (3.5 overs)		Ellyse Perry 48* (41); Amanda-Jade Wellington 2/16 (4 overs)

Sydney Sixers won by 4 wickets (with 13 balls remaining)
Adelaide Oval
Umpires: Cain Kemp and Craig Thomas
Player of the match: Ellyse Perry (Sixers)

- Adelaide Strikers won the toss and elected to bat
- Streamed on cricket.com.au

Match 40
10 January
15:05
Scorecard

Melbourne Stars; 4/96 (16.5 overs)	v	Adelaide Strikers; 9/94 (20 overs)
Katie Mack 31* (33); Megan Schutt 2/14 (4 overs)		Bridget Patterson 22* (24); Kristen Beams 3/12 (4 overs)

Melbourne Stars won by 6 wickets (with 19 balls remaining)
Melbourne Cricket Ground
Umpires: Daryl Brigham and Stephen Brne
Player of the match: Kristen Beams (Stars)

- Melbourne Stars won the toss and elected to field
- Double header with BBL game
- Streamed on cricket.com.au

Match 42
13 January
14:00
Scorecard

Adelaide Strikers; 88 (17.4 overs)	v	Melbourne Stars; 125 (19.3 overs)
Charlotte Edwards 35 (39); Kristen Beams 3/11 (3 overs)		Jess Cameron 42 (48); Megan Schutt 2/15 (4 overs)

Melbourne Stars won by 37 runs
Lilac Hill, Perth
Umpires: A Kovalevs and Todd Rann
Player of the match: Jess Cameron (Stars)

- Adelaide Strikers won the toss and elected to field
- Streamed on cricket.com.au

Match 45
14 January
13:35
Scorecard

Perth Scorchers; 3/122 (18 overs)	v	Adelaide Strikers; 6/120 (20 overs)
Heather Graham 39*(30); Tahlia McGrath 1/17 (4 overs)		Charlotte Edwards 31 (23); Piepa Cleary 3/21 (4 overs)

Perth Scorchers won by 7 wickets (with 12 balls remaining)
WACA Ground, Perth
Umpires: Nathan Johnstone and Trent Steenholdt
Player of the match: Heather Graham

- Perth Scorchers won the toss and elected to field
- Double header with BBL game
- Streamed by cricket.com.au

Match 49
20 January
14:05
Scorecard

Brisbane Heat; 1/142 (15 overs)	v	Adelaide Strikers; 5/139 (20 overs)
Beth Mooney 75* (47); Tahlia McGrath 1/18 (2 overs)		Tammy Beaumont 50* (42); Delissa Kimmince 2/18 (3 overs)

Brisbane Heat won by 9 wickets (with 30 balls remaining)
The Gabba, Brisbane
Umpires: Murray Branch and Stephen Dionysius
Player of the match: Beth Mooney (Heat)

- Brisbane Heat won the toss and elected to field
- Double header with BBL game
- Streamed by cricket.com.au

Match 53
21 January
10:00
Scorecard

Adelaide Strikers; 8/127 (20 overs)	v	Brisbane Heat; 6/127 (20 overs)
Tammy Beaumont 58 (54); Sammy-Jo Johnson 2/10 (2 overs)		Deandra Dottin 51 (41); Amanda-Jade Wellington 2/8 (4 overs)

Brisbane Heat won in Super Over
The Gabba, Brisbane
Umpires: Steven Farrell and David Taylor
Player of the match: Deandra Dottin (Heat)

- Adelaide Strikers won the toss and elected to field
- Streamed by cricket.com.au
