= 2016–17 Brisbane Heat WBBL season =

Brisbane Heat
2016–17 season
- Coach: (Australia) Andy Richards
- Captain(s): (Australia) Delissa Kimmince / (Australia) Kirby Short
- Home ground: The Gabba; Allan Border Field
- WBBL Season: 3rd
- WBBL Finals: Semi-finalist

The 2016–17 Brisbane Heat WBBL season was the second in the team's history. Captained by Delissa Kimmince until early January 2017 and by Kirby Short for the rest of the season, and coached by Andy Richards, the team competed in the WBBL|02 competition.

At the conclusion of the group stage, the Heat was third on the table. The Heat then lost to the Perth Scorchers in a semi-final to finish WBBL|02 in equal third place (with the Hobart Hurricanes).

== Squad ==
The following is the Heat women squad for WBBL|02. Players with international caps are listed in bold.

No.	Name	Nat.	Birth date	Batting style	Bowling style	Notes
Batsmen
36	Tess Cooper	(Australia)		Right-handed		
1	Laura Harris	(Australia)	18 August 1990 (age 36)			
	**Smriti Mandhana**	(India)	18 July 1996 (age 30)	Left-handed	Right arm medium	Overseas international
10	Kirby Short	(Australia)	3 November 1986 (age 40)	Right-handed	Right-arm off break	Captain from early Jan 2017
All-rounders
15	Jemma Barsby	(Australia)	4 October 1995 (age 31)	Left-handed	Right-arm medium	
23	Haidee Birkett	(Australia)		Right-handed	Right-arm medium	
5	**Deandra Dottin**	(Cricket West Indies)	21 June 1991 (age 35)	Right-handed	Right arm fast medium	Overseas international
21	**Jess Jonassen**	(Australia)	5 November 1992 (age 34)	Left-handed	Left-arm orthodox spin	
11	**Delissa Kimmince**	(Australia)	14 May 1989 (age 37)	Right-handed	Right-arm medium	Captain to early Jan 2017
Wicketkeepers
6	**Beth Mooney**	(Australia)	14 January 1994 (age 32)	Left-handed		
Pace bowlers
9	**Holly Ferling**	(Australia)	22 December 1995 (age 30)	Right-handed	Right-arm fast medium	
22	Courtney Hill	(Australia)	9 January 1987 (age 39)		Right-arm	
58	Sammy-Jo Johnson	(Australia)	5 November 1992 (age 34)	Right-handed	Right-arm medium fast	
16	Georgia Prestwidge	(Australia)	17 December 1997 (age 28)	Right-handed	Right-arm medium	
26	Kara Sutherland	(Australia)	26 September 1991 (age 35)	Left-handed	Left-arm fast medium	
Spin bowlers
	**Li Yingying**	(China)			Right-arm off spin	Associate Rookie

== Ladder ==
Pos	Team	Pld	W	L	NR	Ded	Pts	NRR
1	Sydney Sixers (C)	14	9	5	0	0	18	0.442
2	Perth Scorchers (RU)	14	8	6	0	0	16	0.300
3	Brisbane Heat	14	8	6	0	0	16	0.046
4	Hobart Hurricanes	14	7	6	1	0	15	−0.034
5	Melbourne Stars	14	7	7	0	0	14	0.256
6	Sydney Thunder	14	6	7	1	0	13	−0.046
7	Melbourne Renegades	14	6	8	0	0.5	11.5	−0.519
8	Adelaide Strikers	14	3	9	2	0	8	−0.541

- The top four teams qualified for the play-off phase.

== Fixtures ==
=== Group stage ===
Match 6
11 December
14:00
Scorecard

Sydney Sixers; 6/138 (20 overs)	v	Brisbane Heat; 5/142 (19.2 overs)
Alyssa Healy 48 (42); Jess Jonassen 2/25 (4 overs)		Deandra Dottin 60* (44); Sarah Aley 2/17 (4 overs)

Brisbane Heat won by 5 wickets (with 4 balls remaining)
North Sydney Oval
Umpires: Claire Polosak and Tony Wilds
Player of the match: Deandra Dottin (Heat)

- Sydney Sixers won the toss and elected to bat
- Streamed on cricket.com.au; broadcast by Network Ten

Match 7
12 December
18:00 (D/N)
Scorecard

Brisbane Heat; 9/83 (20 overs)	v	Sydney Sixers; 2/86 (16 overs)
Jemma Barsby 26* (31); Ashleigh Gardner 2/7 (3 overs)		Ellyse Perry 45* (43); Jess Jonassen 1/16 (4 overs)

Sydney Sixers won by 8 wickets (with 24 balls remaining)
Drummoyne Oval, Sydney
Umpires: Ben Treloar and Glen Stubbings
Player of the match: Ellyse Perry (Sixers)

- Brisbane Heat won the toss and elected to bat
- Streamed on cricket.com.au

Match 10
17 December
10:00
Scorecard

Brisbane Heat; 9/101 (20 overs)	v	Perth Scorchers; 2/102 (17.1 overs)
Smriti Mandhana 21 (25); Emma King 2/10 (4 overs)		Nicole Bolton 46* (43); Deandra Dottin 1/18 (4 overs)

Perth Scorchers won by 8 wickets (with 17 balls remaining)
WACA Ground, Perth
Umpires: Hennie Botes and John Taylor
Player of the match: Nicole Bolton

- Perth Scorchers won the toss and elected to field
- Streamed on cricket.com.au

Match 16
18 December
10:00
Scorecard

Perth Scorchers; 9/94 (20 overs)	v	Brisbane Heat; 2/95 (12.5 overs)
Elyse Villani 19 (23); Jemma Barsby 2/12 (4 overs)		Beth Mooney 67* (46); Emma King 2/30 (4 overs)

Brisbane Heat won by 8 wickets (with 43 balls remaining)
WACA Ground, Perth
Umpires: Trent Steenholdt and John Taylor
Player of the match: Beth Mooney

- Brisbane Heat won the toss and elected to field
- Streamed on cricket.com.au

Match 17
26 December
13:00
Scorecard

Melbourne Stars; 2/148 (20 overs)	v	Brisbane Heat; 7/94 (20 overs)
Meg Lanning 97* (72); Holly Ferling 1/19 (4 overs)		Kirby Short 27 (37); Morna Nielson 3/19 (4 overs)

Melbourne Stars won by 54 runs
Allan Border Field, Brisbane
Umpires: S Farrell and Murray Branch
Player of the match: Meg Lanning (Stars)

- Brisbane Heat won the toss and elected to field
- Streamed on cricket.com.au

Match 20
27 December
10:00
Scorecard

Brisbane Heat; 5/129 (20 overs)	v	Melbourne Stars; 6/124 (20 overs)
Beth Mooney 55 (50); Gemma Triscari 2/20 (4 overs)		Meg Lanning 50 (42); Smriti Mandhana 2/6 (2 overs)

Brisbane Heat won by 5 runs
Allan Border Field, Brisbane
Umpires: Stephen Dionysuis and Donovan Koch
Player of the match: Beth Mooney (Heat)

- Brisbane Heat won the toss and elected to bat
- Brisbane Heat player Deandra Dottin collided with a teammate while fielding a ball and received a head injury.
- Streamed on cricket.com.au

Match 28
2 January
13:00
Scorecard

Brisbane Heat; 9/129 (20 overs)	v	Sydney Thunder; 8/132 (20 overs)
Beth Mooney 34 (40); Nicola Carey & Samantha Bates 2/18 (4 overs)		Rachael Haynes 40 (29); Haidee Birkett 2/25 (4 overs)

Sydney Thunder won by 3 runs
Blacktown International Sportspark, Sydney
Umpires: Marc Nickl and T Penman
Player of the match: Samantha Bates (Heat)

- Brisbane Heat won the toss and elected to field
- Sydney Thunder was penalised 1 point for slow over rate
- Streamed on cricket.com.au

Match 30
3 January
13:00
Scorecard

Sydney Thunder; 8/115 (20 overs)	v	Brisbane Heat; 1/117 (18.5 overs)
Alex Blackwell 43 (49); Kara Sutherland 3/5 (2 overs)		Beth Mooney 75* (66)

Brisbane Heat won by 9 wickets (with 7 balls remaining)
Blacktown International Sportspark, Sydney
Umpires: Marc Nickl and T Penman
Player of the match: Beth Mooney (Heat)

- Sydney Thunder won the toss and elected to bat
- Streamed on cricket.com.au

Match 36
8 January
13:45
Scorecard

Hobart Hurricanes; 8/138 (20 overs)	v	Brisbane Heat; 2/153 (20 overs)
Amy Satterthwaite 57 (48); Jemma Barsby 3/34 (4 overs)		Beth Mooney 78* (60); Amy Satterthwaite 1/18 (4 overs)

Brisbane Heat won by 15 runs
Blundstone Arena, Hobart
Umpires: Darren Close and Simon Lightbody
Player of the match: Beth Mooney (Heat)

- Brisbane Heat won the toss and elected to bat.
- Double header with BBL game
- Streamed on cricket.com.au; broadcast by Network Ten

Match 39
9 January
18:30 (D/N)
Scorecard

Brisbane Heat; 122 (19.4 overs)	v	Hobart Hurricanes; 2/123 (18.2 overs)
Smriti Mandhana 40 (33); Hayley Matthews 5/19 (3.4 overs)		Georgia Redmayne 64* (50); Jess Jonassen 1/16 (4 overs)

Hobart Hurricanes won by 8 wickets (with 10 balls remaining)
Blundstone Arena, Hobart
Umpires: Darren Close and Muhammad Qureshi
Player of the match: Hayley Matthews (Hurricanes)

- Brisbane Heat won the toss and chose to bat
- Streamed on cricket.com.au

Match 43
14 January
10:00
Scorecard

Brisbane Heat; 5/105 (17.5 overs)	v	Melbourne Renegades; 102 (18.5 overs)
Beth Mooney 45 (39); Danielle Wyatt 2/12 (3 overs)		Kris Britt 32 (26); Jemma Barsby 4/13 (3 overs)

Brisbane Heat won by 5 wickets (with 13 balls remaining)
Allan Border Field, Brisbane
Umpires: Murray Branch and Steven Farrell
Player of the match: Jemma Barsby (Heat)

- Brisbane Heat won the toss and elected to field
- Streamed by cricket.com.au

Match 46
15 January
10:00
Scorecard

Melbourne Renegades; 3/102 (14 overs)	v	Brisbane Heat; 8/125 (20 overs)
Rachel Priest 44 (39); Jess Jonassen 2/6 (3 overs)		Delissa Kimmince 39 (31); Molly Strano 3/19 (4 overs)

Melbourne Renegades won by 7 wickets (D/L method)
Allan Border Field, Brisbane
Umpires: Stephen Dionysius and David Taylor
Player of the match: Rachel Priest (Renegades)

- Melbourne Renegades won the toss and elected to field
- Melbourne Renegades' target revised to 102 runs from 15 overs following a rain delay
- Streamed by cricket.com.au

Match 49
20 January
14:05
Scorecard

Brisbane Heat; 1/142 (15 overs)	v	Adelaide Strikers; 5/139 (20 overs)
Beth Mooney 75* (47); Tahlia McGrath 1/18 (2 overs)		Tammy Beaumont 50* (42); Delissa Kimmince 2/18 (3 overs)

Brisbane Heat won by 9 wickets (with 30 balls remaining)
The Gabba, Brisbane
Umpires: Murray Branch and Stephen Dionysius
Player of the match: Beth Mooney (Heat)

- Brisbane Heat won the toss and elected to field
- Double header with BBL game
- Streamed by cricket.com.au

Match 53
21 January
10:00
Scorecard

Adelaide Strikers; 8/127 (20 overs)	v	Brisbane Heat; 6/127 (20 overs)
Tammy Beaumont 58 (54); Sammy-Jo Johnson 2/10 (2 overs)		Deandra Dottin 51 (41); Amanda-Jade Wellington 2/8 (4 overs)

Brisbane Heat won in Super Over
The Gabba, Brisbane
Umpires: Steven Farrell and David Taylor
Player of the match: Deandra Dottin (Heat)

- Adelaide Strikers won the toss and elected to field
- Streamed by cricket.com.au

=== Knockout phase ===
==== Semi-final ====
24 January
11:40
Scorecard

Perth Scorchers; 1/125 (15.4 overs)	v	Brisbane Heat; 5/124 (20 overs)
Kirby Short 39 (49); Emma King 2/17 (4 overs)		Elyse Villani 52 (48)

Perth Scorchers won by 9 wickets (with 26 balls remaining)
WACA Ground, Perth
Umpires: Michael Graham-Smith and Damien Mealey
Player of the match: Emma King (Scorchers)

- Perth Scorchers won the toss and elected to field
- Was played as a double header prior to Semi Final 1 of the Men's BBL. Both matches were broadcast on Network Ten
