= 2016–17 Sydney Sixers WBBL season =

Sydney Sixers
2016–17 season
- Coach: (Australia) Ben Sawyer
- Captain(s): (Australia) Ellyse Perry
- Home ground: Sydney Cricket Ground
- WBBL Season: 1st
- WBBL Finals: Winner

The 2016–17 Sydney Sixers WBBL season was the second in the team's history. Coached by Ben Sawyer and captained by Ellyse Perry, the team competed in the WBBL|02 tournament.

At the conclusion of the group stage, the Sixers team was at the top of the table. The Sixers then defeated the Hobart Hurricanes in a semi-final, and the Perth Scorchers in the final, to emerge as the WBBL|02 champions.

== Squad ==
The following is the Sixers women squad for WBBL|02. Players with international caps are listed in bold.

No.	Name	Nat.	Birth date	Batting style	Bowling style	Notes
Batsmen
6	Ashleigh Gardner	(Australia)	15 April 1997 (age 28)	Right-handed	Right arm off spin	
All-rounders
15	Rhiannon Dick	(Australia)	21 September 1990 (age 35)	Left-handed	Left-arm orthodox spin	
	**Kim Garth**	(Ireland)	25 April 1995 (age 30)	Right-handed	Right-arm medium	Associate Rookie
4	Jodie Hicks	(Australia)	19 January 1997 (age 29)	Right-handed	Right arm medium	
17	**Marizanne Kapp**	(South Africa)	4 January 1990 (age 36)	Right-handed	Right arm medium	Overseas international
74	Carly Leeson	(Australia)	(age 18)	Right-handed	Right arm medium	
9	Emily Leys	(Australia)	18 February 1993 (age 32)	Right-handed	Left arm medium	
8	**Ellyse Perry**	(Australia)	3 November 1990 (age 35)	Right-handed	Right arm fast medium	Captain
7	**Lisa Sthalekar**	(Australia)	13 August 1979 (age 46)	Right-handed	Right arm off spin	
20	**Dane van Niekerk**	(South Africa)	14 May 1993 (age 32)	Right-handed	Right arm leg spin	Overseas international
Wicketkeepers
77	**Alyssa Healy**	(Australia)	24 March 1990 (age 35)	Right-handed		
28	**Sara McGlashan**	(New Zealand)	28 March 1982 (age 43)	Right-handed		Overseas international
Pace bowlers
3	Sarah Aley	(Australia)	3 June 1984 (age 41)	Right-handed	Right arm medium	
2	Lauren Smith	(Australia)	6 October 1996 (age 29)	Right-handed	Right arm medium	
Spin bowlers
33	Angela Reakes	(Australia)	27 December 1990 (age 35)	Right-handed	Right arm leg spin	

== Ladder ==
Pos	Team	Pld	W	L	NR	Ded	Pts	NRR
1	Sydney Sixers (C)	14	9	5	0	0	18	0.442
2	Perth Scorchers (RU)	14	8	6	0	0	16	0.300
3	Brisbane Heat	14	8	6	0	0	16	0.046
4	Hobart Hurricanes	14	7	6	1	0	15	−0.034
5	Melbourne Stars	14	7	7	0	0	14	0.256
6	Sydney Thunder	14	6	7	1	0	13	−0.046
7	Melbourne Renegades	14	6	8	0	0.5	11.5	−0.519
8	Adelaide Strikers	14	3	9	2	0	8	−0.541

- The top four teams qualified for the play-off phase.

== Fixtures ==
=== Group stage ===
Match 6
11 December
14:00
Scorecard

Sydney Sixers; 6/138 (20 overs)	v	Brisbane Heat; 5/142 (19.2 overs)
Alyssa Healy 48 (42); Jess Jonassen 2/25 (4 overs)		Deandra Dottin 60* (44); Sarah Aley 2/17 (4 overs)

Brisbane Heat won by 5 wickets (with 4 balls remaining)
North Sydney Oval
Umpires: Claire Polosak and Tony Wilds
Player of the match: Deandra Dottin (Heat)

- Sydney Sixers won the toss and elected to bat
- Streamed on cricket.com.au; broadcast by Network Ten

Match 7
12 December
18:00 (D/N)
Scorecard

Brisbane Heat; 9/83 (20 overs)	v	Sydney Sixers; 2/86 (16 overs)
Jemma Barsby 26* (31); Ashleigh Gardner 2/7 (3 overs)		Ellyse Perry 45* (43); Jess Jonassen 1/16 (4 overs)

Sydney Sixers won by 8 wickets (with 24 balls remaining)
Drummoyne Oval, Sydney
Umpires: Ben Treloar and Glen Stubbings
Player of the match: Ellyse Perry (Sixers)

- Brisbane Heat won the toss and elected to bat
- Streamed on cricket.com.au

Match 11
17 December
14:00
Scorecard

Sydney Sixers; 8/122 (20 overs)	v	Melbourne Stars; 3/124 (17.2 overs)
Sara McGlashan 40 (32); Emma Kearney 3/13 (4 overs)		Meg Lanning 66* (48); Marizanne Kapp 2/21 (4 overs)

Melbourne Stars won by 7 wickets (with 16 balls remaining)
Casey Fields No.4, Melbourne
Umpires: Dale Ireland and David Shepard
Player of the match: Meg Lanning

- Sydney Sixers won the toss and elected to bat
- Streamed on cricket.com.au

Match 14
17 December
10:00
Scorecard

Melbourne Stars; 3/115 (16.5 overs)	v	Sydney Sixers; 8/111 (20 overs)
Katie Mack 48* (33); Marizanne Kapp 2/13 (3.5 overs)		Ashleigh Gardner 43 (32); Danielle Hazell 2/15 (4 overs)

Melbourne Stars won by 7 wickets (with 19 balls remaining)
Casey Fields No.4, Melbourne
Umpires: Dale Ireland and David Shepard
Player of the match: Danielle Hazell

- Melbourne Stars won the toss and elected to field
- Streamed on cricket.com.au

Match 23
28 December
14:35
Scorecard

Sydney Thunder; 7/131 (20 overs)	v	Sydney Sixers; 3/164 (20 overs)
Erin Osborne 32 (30); Marizanne Kapp 2/29 (4 overs)		Alyssa Healy 55 (38); Rachael Haynes 1/11 (2 overs)

Sydney Sixers won by 33 runs
Spotless Stadium, Sydney
Umpires: Mark Nickl and T Penman
Player of the match: Alyssa Healy (Sixers)

- Sydney Thunder won the toss and chose to field
- Double header with BBL game
- Streamed on cricket.com.au

Match 24
29 December
14:30
Scorecard

Sydney Sixers; 3/110 (18.2 overs)	v	Hobart Hurricanes; 8/106 (20 overs)
Hayley Matthews 27 (33); Sarah Aley 3/13 (3 overs)		Ellyse Perry 44* (44); Hayley Matthews 2/20 (3.2 overs)

Sydney Sixers won by 7 wickets (with 10 balls remaining)
Hurstville Oval, Sydney
Umpires: Anthony Hobson and T Penman
Player of the match: Sarah Aley (Sixers)

- Hobart Hurricanes won the toss and elected to bat
- Streamed on cricket.com.au

Match 29
2 January
12:30
Scorecard

Sydney Sixers; 3/161 (20 overs)	v	Adelaide Strikers; 5/142 (20 overs)
Alyssa Healy 51 (40); Sarah Coyte 2/34 (4 overs)		Tammy Beaumont 57 (56); Sarah Aley 1/18 (4 overs)

Sydney Sixers won by 19 runs
Adelaide Oval
Umpires: Craig Thomas and Luke Uthenwoldt
Player of the match: Alyssa Healy (Sixers)

- Sydney Sixers won the toss and elected to bat
- Streamed on cricket.com.au

Match 31
3 January
12:30
Scorecard

Adelaide Strikers; 10/94 (19.5 overs)	v	Sydney Sixers; 6/97 (17.5 overs)
Tammy Beaumont 30 (34); Lisa Sthalekar 3/12 (3.5 overs)		Ellyse Perry 48* (41); Amanda-Jade Wellington 2/16 (4 overs)

Sydney Sixers won by 4 wickets (with 13 balls remaining)
Adelaide Oval
Umpires: Cain Kemp and Craig Thomas
Player of the match: Ellyse Perry (Sixers)

- Adelaide Strikers won the toss and elected to bat
- Streamed on cricket.com.au

Match 37
8 January
14:30
Scorecard

Perth Scorchers; 6/120 (20 overs)	v	Sydney Sixers; 6/132 (20 overs)
Suzie Bates 52 (53); Lauren Smith 2/23 (4 overs)		Ashleigh Gardner 40 (23); Anya Shrubsole 2/20 (4 overs)

Sydney Sixers won by 12 runs
Hurstville Oval, Sydney
Umpires: T Pennman and Tony Wilds
Player of the match: Ashleigh Gardner (Sixers)

- Sydney Sixers won the toss and elected to bat
- Streamed on cricket.com.au

Match 38
9 January
14:30
Scorecard

Sydney Sixers; 6/133 (19.3 overs)	v	Perth Scorchers; 9/129 (20 overs)
Alyssa Healy 46 (31); Katherine Brunt 2/25 (4 overs)		Lauren Ebsary 37 (28); Lauren Smith 4/23 (4 overs)

Sydney Sixers won by 4 wickets (with 3 balls remaining)
Sydney Cricket Ground
Umpires: G Stubbings and Ben Treloar
Player of the match: Alyssa Healy (Sixers)

- Perth Scorchers won the toss and elected to bat
- Double header with BBL game
- Streamed on cricket.com.au

Match 41
13 January
14:30
Scorecard

Hobart Hurricanes; 8/118 (20 overs)	v	Sydney Sixers; 6/134 (20 overs)
Corinne Hall 42 (43); Sarah Aley 3/20 (4 overs)		Ellyse Perry 60 (54); Julie Hunter 2/13 (4 overs)

Sydney Sixers won by 16 runs
North Sydney Oval
Umpires: G Stubbings and Ben Treloar
Player of the match: Ellyse Perry (Sixers)

- Hobart Hurricanes won the toss and elected to field
- Streamed on cricket.com.au

Match 44
14 January
13:45
Scorecard

Sydney Sixers; 7/138 (20 overs)	v	Sydney Thunder; 6/138 (20 overs)
Ashleigh Gardner 54 (41); Rene Farrell 3/26 (4 overs)		Stafanie Taylor 68 (51); Lisa Sthalekar 2/19 (2 overs)

Sydney Thunder won in Super Over
Sydney Cricket Ground
Umpires: Claire Polosak and Tony Wilds
Player of the match: Stafanie Taylor (Thunder)

- Sydney Sixers won the toss and elected to bat
- Double header with BBL game
- Broadcast by Network Ten

Match 52
20 January
14:30
Scorecard

Sydney Sixers; 5/148 (20 overs)	v	Melbourne Renegades; 4/150 (18.4 overs)
Ashleigh Gardner 56 (38); Molly Strano 2/27 (4 overs)		Rachel Priest 44 (40); Ashleigh Gardner 2/22 (4 overs)

Melbourne Renegades won by 6 wickets (with 8 balls remaining)
North Sydney Oval
Umpires: Anthony Hobson and Ben Treloar
Player of the match: Maitlan Brown (Renegades)

- Melbourne Renegades won the toss and elected to field
- Streamed by cricket.com.au

Match 55
21 January
14:30
Scorecard

Melbourne Renegades; 9/123 (20 overs)	v	Sydney Sixers; 5/158 (20 overs)
Sophie Molineux 24 (25); Sarah Aley 3/14 (4 overs)		Alyssa Healy 84 (56); Molly Strano 2/33 (4 overs)

Sydney Sixers won by 35 runs
North Sydney Oval
Umpires: Anthony Hobson and Ben Treloar
Player of the match: Alyssa Healy (Sixers)

- Melbourne Renegades won the toss and elected to field
- Streamed by cricket.com.au

=== Knockout phase ===
==== Semi-final ====
25 January
13:40
Scorecard

Sydney Sixers; 6/169 (20 overs)	v	Hobart Hurricanes; 66 (14.1 overs)
Alyssa Healy 77 (45); Erin Burns 2/26 (4 overs)		Erin Burns 14 (15); Ashleigh Gardner 2/9 (3 overs)

Sydney Sixers won by 103 runs
The Gabba, Brisbane
Umpires: Phillip Gillespie and Tony Wilds
Player of the match: Alyssa Healy (Sixers)

- Sydney Sixers won the toss and elected to bat
- Was played as a double header prior to Semi Final 2 of the Men's BBL. Both matches were broadcast by Network Ten.

==== Final ====
28 January
10:45
Scorecard

Perth Scorchers; 7/117 (20 overs)	v	Sydney Sixers; 5/124 (20 overs)
Katherine Brunt 35* (30); Sarah Aley 4/23 (4 overs)		Alyssa Healy 40 (27); Anya Shrubsole 2/17 (4 overs)

Sydney Sixers won by 7 runs
WACA Ground, Perth
Umpires: Shawn Craig and Greg Davidson
Player of the match: Sarah Aley (Sixers)

- Perth Scorchers won the toss and elected to field
- Sydney Sixers won their first WBBL title
