= 2016–17 Melbourne Renegades WBBL season =

Melbourne Renegades
2016–17 season
- Coach: Lachlan Stevens
- Captain(s): Rachel Priest
- Home ground: Etihad Stadium, Queen Elizabeth Oval, Camberwell Sports Ground

The 2016–17 Melbourne Renegades WBBL season was the second in the team's history. Coached by Lachlan Stevens and captained by Rachel Priest, they competed in the WBBL's 2016–17 season.

== Fixtures ==
=== Regular season ===
10 December
13:45
Scorecard

Adelaide Strikers; 116 (19.3 overs)	v	Melbourne Renegades; 102 (19.1 overs)
Sophie Devine 43 (38); Molly Strano 3/17 (4 overs)		Sophie Molineux 37* (30); Alex Price 2/8 (1.1 overs)

Adelaide Strikers won by 14 runs
North Sydney Oval
Umpires: Simon Lightbody and Claire Polosak
Player of the match: Sophie Devine (Strikers)

- Melbourne Renegades won the toss and elected to field
- Streamed on cricket.com.au; broadcast by Network Ten

11 December
10:00
Scorecard

Melbourne Renegades; 3/131 (19.3 overs)	v	Adelaide Strikers; 6/128 (20 overs)
Rachel Priest 44 (37); Shelley Nitschke 2/10 (4 overs)		Sophie Devine 41* (27); Sophie Molineux 4/18 (4 overs)

Melbourne Renegades won by 7 wickets
North Sydney Oval No. 2
Umpires: Mark Nickl and Glen Stubbings
Player of the match: Sophie Molineux (Renegades)

- Adelaide Strikers won the toss and elected to bat
- Streamed on cricket.com.au

17 December
16:10
Scorecard

Melbourne Renegades; 5/130 (20 overs)	v	Hobart Hurricanes; 4/133 (20 overs)
Kris Britt 51* (49); Amy Satterthwaite 2/22 (4 overs)		Amy Satterthwaite 45* (43); Grace Harris 1/15 (4 overs)

Hobart Hurricanes won by 3 runs
Queen Elizabeth Oval, Bendigo
Umpires: Daryl Brigham and Stephen Brne
Player of the match: Amy Satterthwaite

- Melbourne Renegades won the toss and elected to field
- Streamed on cricket.com.au

18 December
12:00
Scorecard

Hobart Hurricanes; 5/121 (20 overs)	v	Melbourne Renegades; 6/121 (20 overs)
Amy Satterthwaite 52* (41); Molly Strano 1/14 (4 overs)		Kris Britt 36 (37); Hayley Matthews 4/23 (4 overs)

Hobart Hurricanes won in the super over
Queen Elizabeth Oval, Bendigo
Umpires: Daryl Brigham and Stephen Brne
Player of the match: Amy Satterthwaite

- Melbourne Renegades won the toss and elected to field
- Streamed on cricket.com.au

26 December
14:00
Scorecard

Melbourne Renegades; 4/110 (20 overs)	v	Sydney Thunder; 2/114 (15.5 overs)
Kris Britt 50 (52); Samantha Bates 2/22 (4 overs)		Alex Blackwell 61* (38); Lea Tahunu 1/14 (4 overs)

Sydney Thunder won by 8 wickets
Blacktown International Sportspark, Sydney
Umpires: Anthony Hobson and Dinusha Bandara
Player of the match: Alex Blackwell (Thunder)

- Sydney Thunder won the toss and elected to field
- Streamed on cricket.com.au

27 December
14:00
Scorecard

Sydney Thunder; 2/96 (11.4 overs)	v	Melbourne Renegades; 6/93 (20 overs)
Danielle Wyatt 26 (21); Erin Osbourne 3/23 (4 overs)		Stafanie Taylor 48 (37); Molly Strano 3/15 (3 overs)

Sydney Thunder won by 8 wickets
Blacktown International Sportspark, Sydney
Umpires: Anthony Hobson and Yohan Ramasundara
Player of the match: Stafanie Taylor (Thunder)

- Sydney Thunder won the toss and elected to field
- Streamed on cricket.com.au

29 December
14:35
Scorecard

Melbourne Renegades; 7/123 (20 overs)	v	Perth Scorchers; 5/155 (20 overs)
Sophie Molineux 37 (37); Emma King 2/25 (4 overs)		Elyse Villani 60 (43); Molly Strano 2/25 (4 overs)

Perth Scorchers won by 32 runs
Etihad Stadium, Melbourne
Umpires: Daryl Brigham and Dale Ireland
Player of the match: Elyse Villani (Scorchers)

- Melbourne Renegades won the toss and elected to field
- Melbourne Renegades were penalised 0.5 points for slow over rate
- Double header with BBL game
- Streamed on cricket.com.au

1 January
13:45
Scorecard

Melbourne Stars; 3/127 (20 overs)	v	Melbourne Renegades; 1/52 (5.3 overs)
Meg Lanning 64 (53); Nicole Goodwin 1/29 (4 overs)		Rachel Priest 31 (19); Natalie Sciver 1/6 (1 over)

Melbourne Renegades won by 9 wickets (D/L method)
Melbourne Cricket Ground
Attendance: 24,547
Attendance: 24,547
Umpires: Stephen Brne and David Shepard
Player of the match: Rachel Priest (Renegades)

- Melbourne Stars won the toss and elected to bat
- Melbourne Renegades' target revised to 52 runs from 8 overs following a rain delay
- The match was played in front of a WBBL record crowd of 24,547
- Double header with BBL game
- Streamed on cricket.com.au; broadcast by Network Ten

4 January
13:00
Scorecard

Perth Scorchers; 7/131 (20 overs)	v	Melbourne Renegades; 5/132 (18.1 overs)
Heather Graham 30 (25); Molly Strano 2/18 (4 overs)		Danielle Wyatt 43 (42); Emma King 2/30 (4 overs)

Melbourne Renegades won by 5 wickets
Camberwell Sports Ground, Melbourne
Umpires: Daryl Brigham and Stephen Brne
Player of the match: Grace Harris (Renegades)

- Perth Scorchers won the toss and elected to bat
- Streamed on cricket.com.au

7 January
14:35
Scorecard

Melbourne Renegades; 5/128 (19.3 overs)	v	Melbourne Stars; 7/127 (20 overs)
Danielle Wyatt 40 (31); Gemma Triscari 1/17 (4 overs)		Natalie Sciver 37 (27); Molly Strano 2/20 (4 overs)

Melbourne Renegades won by 5 wickets
Etihad Stadium, Melbourne
Umpires: Stephan Brne and Dale Ireland
Player of the match: Danielle Wyatt (Renegades)

- Melbourne Renegades won the toss and elected to field
- Double header with BBL game
- Streamed on cricket.com.au

14 January
10:00
Scorecard

Brisbane Heat; 5/105 (17.5 overs)	v	Melbourne Renegades; 102 (18.5 overs)
Beth Mooney 45 (39); Danielle Wyatt 2/12 (3 overs)		Kris Britt 32 (26); Jemma Barsby 4/13 (3 overs)

Brisbane Heat won by 5 wickets
Allan Border Field, Brisbane
Umpires: Murray Branch and Steven Farrell
Player of the match: Jemma Barsby (Heat)

- Brisbane Heat won the toss and elected to field
- Streamed by cricket.com.au

15 January
10:00
Scorecard

Melbourne Renegades; 3/102 (14 overs)	v	Brisbane Heat; 8/125 (20 overs)
Rachel Priest 44 (39); Jess Jonassen 2/6 (3 overs)		Delissa Kimmince 39 (31); Molly Strano 3/19 (4 overs)

Melbourne Renegades won by 7 wickets (D/L method)
Allan Border Field, Brisbane
Umpires: Stephen Dionysius and David Taylor
Player of the match: Rachel Priest (Renegades)

- Melbourne Renegades won the toss and elected to field
- Melbourne Renegades' target revised to 102 runs from 15 overs following a rain delay
- Streamed by cricket.com.au

20 January
14:30
Scorecard

Sydney Sixers; 5/148 (20 overs)	v	Melbourne Renegades; 4/150 (18.4 overs)
Ashleigh Gardner 56 (38); Molly Strano 2/27 (4 overs)		Rachel Priest 44 (40); Ashleigh Gardner 2/22 (4 overs)

Melbourne Renegades won by 6 wickets
North Sydney Oval
Umpires: Anthony Hobson and Ben Treloar
Player of the match: Maitlan Brown (Renegades)

- Melbourne Renegades won the toss and elected to field
- Streamed by cricket.com.au

21 January
14:30
Scorecard

Melbourne Renegades; 9/123 (20 overs)	v	Sydney Sixers; 5/158 (20 overs)
Sophie Molineux 24 (25); Sarah Aley 3/14 (4 overs)		Alyssa Healy 84 (56); Molly Strano 2/33 (4 overs)

Sydney Sixers won by 35 runs
North Sydney Oval
Umpires: Anthony Hobson and Ben Treloar
Player of the match: Alyssa Healy (Sixers)

- Melbourne Renegades won the toss and elected to field
- Streamed by cricket.com.au

== Ladder ==
Pos	Team	Pld	W	L	NR	Ded	Pts	NRR
1	Sydney Sixers (C)	14	9	5	0	0	18	0.442
2	Perth Scorchers (RU)	14	8	6	0	0	16	0.300
3	Brisbane Heat	14	8	6	0	0	16	0.046
4	Hobart Hurricanes	14	7	6	1	0	15	−0.034
5	Melbourne Stars	14	7	7	0	0	14	0.256
6	Sydney Thunder	14	6	7	1	0	13	−0.046
7	Melbourne Renegades	14	6	8	0	0.5	11.5	−0.519
8	Adelaide Strikers	14	3	9	2	0	8	−0.541

- The top four teams qualified for the play-off phase.

== Squad ==
Each WBBL|02 squad featured 15 active players, with an allowance of up to five marquee signings including a maximum of three from overseas. Australian marquees are classed as players who made at least ten limited-overs appearances for the national team between 1 July 2013 and 1 July 2016. The table below lists the Renegades players and their key stats (including runs scored, batting strike rate, wickets taken, economy rate, catches and stumpings) for the season.

No.	Name	Nationality	Date of birth	Batting style	Bowling style	G	R	SR	W	E	C	S	Notes
Batters
8	Kris Britt	Australia	13 April 1984	Right-handed	Right-arm leg spin	14	290	93.54	–	–	4	–	
28	Danielle Wyatt	England	22 April 1991	Right-handed	Right-arm off spin	14	260	100.77	8	7.85	3	–	Overseas marquee
88	Amy Yates	Australia	30 September 1998	Right-handed	Right-arm medium	1	9	90.00	–	–	0	–	
All-rounders
17	Grace Harris	Australia	18 September 1993	Right-handed	Right-arm off spin	12	127	122.11	6	6.62	4	–	Australian marquee
23	Sophie Molineux	Australia	17 January 1998	Left-handed	Left-arm orthodox	14	256	99.61	8	6.69	2	–	
5	Molly Strano	Australia	5 October 1992	Right-handed	Right-arm off spin	14	149	98.67	21	5.92	3	–	
3	Annabel Sutherland	Australia	12 October 2001	Right-handed	Right-arm medium fast	4	13	68.42	–	–	0	–	
Wicketkeepers
13	Rachel Priest	New Zealand	13 July 1985	Right-handed	–	14	263	100.76	–	–	6	2	Captain, overseas marquee
Bowlers
77	Maitlan Brown	Australia	5 June 1997	Right-handed	Right-arm medium fast	14	56	124.44	4	6.94	5	–	
	Rubina Chhetri	Nepal	26 November 1993	Right-handed	Right-arm medium	–	–	–	–	–	–	–	Associate rookie
10	Nicole Goodwin	Australia	14 September 1984	Right-handed	Left-arm medium	13	8	61.53	5	7.03	3	–	
27	Kirsty Lamb	Australia	27 June 1994	Right-handed	Left-arm medium	–	–	–	–	–	–	–	
12	Natalie Plane	Australia	4 August 1996	Right-handed	Right-arm medium fast	13	13	81.25	2	10.05	4	–	
6	Lea Tahuhu	New Zealand	23 September 1990	Right-handed	Right-arm fast	13	20	74.07	9	5.75	4	–	Overseas marquee
7	Tayla Vlaeminck	Australia	27 October 1998	Right-handed	Right-arm fast	–	–	–	–	–	–	–	
32	Georgia Wareham	Australia	26 May 1999	Right-handed	Right-arm leg spin	14	44	75.86	0	12.00	5	–	
