= 2023–24 Adelaide Strikers WBBL season =

Cricket team season

Adelaide Strikers
2023-24 season
- Adelaide Strikers 2022–23 cap logo
- Coach: Luke Williams
- Captain(s): Tahlia McGrath
- Home ground: Karen Rolton Oval
- League: WBBL

The 2023–24 Adelaide Strikers Women's season was the ninth in the team's history. Strikers enter the tournament as reigning champions having won the final of last year's tournament by defeating Sydney Sixers by 10 runs.

== Squad ==
Tegan McPharlin (retired), Deandra Dottin and Meagan Dixon did not re-sign with Strikers. The 2023–24 season saw a players draft being held for the first time for Women's Big Bash League on 3 September 2023 for overseas players.

- Young English all-rounder Dannielle Gibson was their draft pick with South African opening batter Laura Wolvaardt was Strikers' retention pick while English all-rounder Georgia Adams was signed by direct nomination, skipping the draft.
- Local pacer Courtney Neale signed with Strikers for this season.

No.	Name	Nat.	Birth date	Batting style	Bowling style	G	R	SR	W	E	C	S	Notes
Batters
2	Katie Mack	(Australia)	14 September 1993	Right-handed	Right-arm leg spin								
5	Annie O'Neil	(Australia)	18 February 1999	Right-handed	Right-arm leg spin								
8	Madeline Penna	(Australia)	30 August 2000	Right-handed	Right-arm leg spin								
14	Laura Wolvaardt	(South Africa)	26 April 1999	Right-handed	–								Overseas
All-rounders
9	Tahlia McGrath	(Australia)	10 November 1995	Right-handed	Right-arm medium								Captain, Australian marquee
28	Danielle Gibson	(England)	30 April 2001	Right-handed	Right-arm medium								Overseas
1	Georgia Adams	(England)	4 October 1993	Right-handed	Right-arm off spin								Overseas
Wicket-keeper
21	Bridget Patterson	(Australia)	4 December 1994	Right-handed	Right-arm medium								
Bowlers
4	Jemma Barsby	(Australia)	4 October 1995	Left-handed	Right-arm off spin								
20	Darcie Brown	(Australia)	7 March 2003	Right-handed	Right-arm fast								Australian marquee
61	Anesu Mushangwe	(Zimbabwe)	25 February 1996	Right-handed	Right-arm medium								
27	Megan Schutt	(Australia)	15 January 1993	Right-handed	Right-arm medium fast								Australian marquee
10	Amanda-Jade Wellington	(Australia)	29 May 1997	Right-handed	Right-arm leg spin								
8	Ella Wilson	(Australia)	17 November 2003	Right-handed	Right-arm medium fast								
	Courtney Neale	(Australia)	4 July 1998	Right-handed	Right-arm medium								
