= 2016–17 Melbourne Stars WBBL season =

Melbourne Stars
2016–17 season
- Coach: (Bermuda) David Hemp
- Captain(s): (Australia) Meg Lanning
- Home ground: Melbourne Cricket Ground; Junction Oval; Albert Cricket Ground
- WBBL Season: 5th
- WBBL Finals: DNQ

The 2016–17 Melbourne Stars WBBL season was the second in the team's history. Coached by David Hemp and captained by Meg Lanning, the team competed in the WBBL|02 tournament.

At the conclusion of the group stage, the Stars were fifth on the ladder, and were therefore eliminated.

== Squad ==
The following is the Stars women squad for WBBL|02. Players with international caps are listed in bold.

| No. | Name | Nat. | Birth date | Batting style | Bowling style | Notes |
Batsmen
| 15 | Makinley Blows | (Australia) | 12 December 1997 (age 28) | Right-handed | Right arm medium | |
| 6 | **Jess Cameron** | (Australia) | 27 June 1989 (age 37) | Right-handed | Right arm leg spin | |
| 7 | **Meg Lanning** | (Australia) | 25 March 1992 (age 34) | Right-handed | Right arm medium | Captain |
All-rounders
| | **Kathryn Bryce** | (Scotland) | 17 November 1997 (age 28) | Right-handed | Right arm medium | Associate Rookie |
| 13 | Alana King | (Australia) | 22 November 1995 (age 30) | Right-handed | Right arm leg spin | |
| 9 | Anna Lanning | (Australia) | 25 March 1994 (age 32) | Right-handed | Right arm medium | |
| 2 | Katie Mack | (Australia) | 14 September 1993 (age 33) | Right-handed | Right arm leg spin | |
| 39 | **Natalie Sciver** | (England) | 20 August 1992 (age 34) | Right-handed | Right arm medium | Overseas international |
Wicketkeepers
| 10 | Lily Bardsley | (Australia) | 7 August 1995 (age 31) | Right-handed | Right arm leg spin | |
| 19 | Emma Inglis | (Australia) | 15 July 1988 (age 38) | Right-handed | | |
Pace bowlers
| 27 | Hayleigh Brennan | (Australia) | 5 March 1999 (age 27) | Right-handed | Right arm medium | |
| 87 | **Hayley Jensen** | (New Zealand) | 7 October 1992 (age 34) | Right-handed | Right arm medium | Overseas international |
| 22 | Emma Kearney | (Australia) | 24 September 1989 (age 37) | Right-handed | Right arm medium | |
| 23 | **Morna Nielsen** | (New Zealand) | 24 February 1990 (age 36) | Right-handed | Left arm medium, Left-arm orthodox spin | Overseas international |
| 8 | Gemma Triscari | (Australia) | 24 January 1990 (age 36) | Left-handed | Left arm fast medium | |
Spin bowlers
| 26 | **Kristen Beams** | (Australia) | 6 November 1984 (age 41) | Right-handed | Right arm leg spin | |

== Ladder ==
| Pos | Team | Pld | W | L | NR | Ded | Pts | NRR |
|---|---|---|---|---|---|---|---|---|
| 1 | Sydney Sixers (C) | 14 | 9 | 5 | 0 | 0 | 18 | 0.442 |
| 2 | Perth Scorchers (RU) | 14 | 8 | 6 | 0 | 0 | 16 | 0.300 |
| 3 | Brisbane Heat | 14 | 8 | 6 | 0 | 0 | 16 | 0.046 |
| 4 | Hobart Hurricanes | 14 | 7 | 6 | 1 | 0 | 15 | −0.034 |
| 5 | Melbourne Stars | 14 | 7 | 7 | 0 | 0 | 14 | 0.256 |
| 6 | Sydney Thunder | 14 | 6 | 7 | 1 | 0 | 13 | −0.046 |
| 7 | Melbourne Renegades | 14 | 6 | 8 | 0 | 0.5 | 11.5 | −0.519 |
| 8 | Adelaide Strikers | 14 | 3 | 9 | 2 | 0 | 8 | −0.541 |

- The top four teams qualified for the play-off phase.

== Fixtures ==
=== Group stage ===
Match 3
10 December
18:15 (D/N)
Scorecard

| Sydney Thunder; 4/141 (20 overs) | v | Melbourne Stars; 8/147 (20 overs) |
| Harmanpreet Kaur 47* (28); Alana King 2/21 (4 overs) | | Emma Inglis 46 (28); Erin Osborne 3/27 (4 overs) |

Melbourne Stars won by 6 runs
North Sydney Oval
Umpires: Claire Polosak and Tony Wilds
Player of the match: Emma Inglis (Stars)

- Melbourne Stars won the toss and elected to bat
- Streamed on cricket.com.au; broadcast by Network Ten

Match 8
13 December
10:00
Scorecard

| Melbourne Stars; 9/116 (20 overs) | v | Sydney Thunder; 2/121 (18.5 overs) |
| Jess Cameron 36 (39); Harmanpreet Kaur 4/27 (4 overs) | | Rachael Haynes 35 (31); Gemma Triscari 1/10 (3 overs) |

Sydney Thunder won by 8 wickets (with 7 balls remaining)
Lavington Sports Ground, Albury
Umpires: Kumar Jeyakkumar and Deanne Young
Player of the match: Harmanpreet Kaur (Stars)

- Melbourne Stars won the toss and elected to bat
- Streamed on cricket.com.au

Match 11
17 December
14:00
Scorecard

| Sydney Sixers; 8/122 (20 overs) | v | Melbourne Stars; 3/124 (17.2 overs) |
| Sara McGlashan 40 (32); Emma Kearney 3/13 (4 overs) | | Meg Lanning 66* (48); Marizanne Kapp 2/21 (4 overs) |

Melbourne Stars won by 7 wickets (with 16 balls remaining)
Casey Fields No.4, Melbourne
Umpires: Dale Ireland and David Shepard
Player of the match: Meg Lanning

- Sydney Sixers won the toss and elected to bat
- Streamed on cricket.com.au

Match 14
17 December
10:00
Scorecard

| Melbourne Stars; 3/115 (16.5 overs) | v | Sydney Sixers; 8/111 (20 overs) |
| Katie Mack 48* (33); Marizanne Kapp 2/13 (3.5 overs) | | Ashleigh Gardner 43 (32); Danielle Hazell 2/15 (4 overs) |

Melbourne Stars won by 7 wickets (with 19 balls remaining)
Casey Fields No.4, Melbourne
Umpires: Dale Ireland and David Shepard
Player of the match: Danielle Hazell

- Melbourne Stars won the toss and elected to field
- Streamed on cricket.com.au

Match 17
26 December
13:00
Scorecard

| Melbourne Stars; 2/148 (20 overs) | v | Brisbane Heat; 7/94 (20 overs) |
| Meg Lanning 97* (72); Holly Ferling 1/19 (4 overs) | | Kirby Short 27 (37); Morna Nielson 3/19 (4 overs) |

Melbourne Stars won by 54 runs
Allan Border Field, Brisbane
Umpires: S Farrell and Murray Branch
Player of the match: Meg Lanning (Stars)

- Brisbane Heat won the toss and elected to field
- Streamed on cricket.com.au

Match 20
27 December
10:00
Scorecard

| Brisbane Heat; 5/129 (20 overs) | v | Melbourne Stars; 6/124 (20 overs) |
| Beth Mooney 55 (50); Gemma Triscari 2/20 (4 overs) | | Meg Lanning 50 (42); Smriti Mandhana 2/6 (2 overs) |

Brisbane Heat won by 5 runs
Allan Border Field, Brisbane
Umpires: Stephen Dionysuis and Donovan Koch
Player of the match: Beth Mooney (Heat)

- Brisbane Heat won the toss and elected to bat
- Brisbane Heat player Deandra Dottin collided with a teammate while fielding a ball and received a head injury.
- Streamed on cricket.com.au

Match 27
1 January
13:45
Scorecard

| Melbourne Stars; 3/127 (20 overs) | v | Melbourne Renegades; 1/52 (5.3 overs) |
| Meg Lanning 64 (53); Nicole Goodwin 1/29 (4 overs) | | Rachel Priest 31 (19); Natalie Sciver 1/6 (1 over) |

Melbourne Renegades won by 9 wickets (D/L method)
Melbourne Cricket Ground
Attendance: 24,547
Attendance: 24,547
Umpires: Stephen Brne and David Shepard
Player of the match: Rachel Priest (Renegades)

- Melbourne Stars won the toss and elected to bat
- Melbourne Renegades' target revised to 52 runs from 8 overs following a rain delay
- The match was played in front of a WBBL record crowd of 24,547
- Double header with BBL game
- Streamed on cricket.com.au; broadcast by Network Ten

Match 33
5 January
13:00
Scorecard

| Perth Scorchers; 1/118 (16.1 overs) | v | Melbourne Stars; 6/117 (20 overs) |
| Elyse Villani 57 (44); Morna Nielsen 1/20 (3 overs) | | Meg Lanning 30 (27); Emma King 1/19 (4 overs) |

Perth Scorchers won by 9 wickets (with 23 balls remaining)
Toorak Park, Melbourne
Umpires: Dale Ireland and David Shepherd
Player of the match: Elyse Villani (Scorchers)

- Perth Scorchers won the toss and elected to field
- Streamed on cricket.com.au

Match 35
7 January
14:35
Scorecard

| Melbourne Renegades; 5/128 (19.3 overs) | v | Melbourne Stars; 7/127 (20 overs) |
| Danielle Wyatt 40 (31); Gemma Triscari 1/17 (4 overs) | | Natalie Sciver 37 (27); Molly Strano 2/20 (4 overs) |

Melbourne Renegades won by 5 wickets (with 3 balls remaining)
Etihad Stadium, Melbourne
Umpires: Stephan Brne and Dale Ireland
Player of the match: Danielle Wyatt (Renegades)

- Melbourne Renegades won the toss and elected to field
- Double header with BBL game
- Streamed on cricket.com.au

Match 40
10 January
15:05
Scorecard

| Melbourne Stars; 4/96 (16.5 overs) | v | Adelaide Strikers; 9/94 (20 overs) |
| Katie Mack 31* (33); Megan Schutt 2/14 (4 overs) | | Bridget Patterson 22* (24); Kristen Beams 3/12 (4 overs) |

Melbourne Stars won by 6 wickets (with 19 balls remaining)
Melbourne Cricket Ground
Umpires: Daryl Brigham and Stephen Brne
Player of the match: Kristen Beams (Stars)

- Melbourne Stars won the toss and elected to field
- Double header with BBL game
- Streamed on cricket.com.au

Match 42
13 January
14:00
Scorecard

| Adelaide Strikers; 88 (17.4 overs) | v | Melbourne Stars; 125 (19.3 overs) |
| Charlotte Edwards 35 (39); Kristen Beams 3/11 (3 overs) | | Jess Cameron 42 (48); Megan Schutt 2/15 (4 overs) |

Melbourne Stars won by 37 runs
Lilac Hill, Perth
Umpires: A Kovalevs and Todd Rann
Player of the match: Jess Cameron (Stars)

- Adelaide Strikers won the toss and elected to field
- Streamed on cricket.com.au

Match 47
15 January
10:00
Scorecard

| Melbourne Stars; 9/97 (20 overs) | v | Perth Scorchers; 4/130 (20 overs) |
| Natalie Sciver 31 (32); Anya Shrubsole 2/9 (3 overs) | | Lauren Ebsary 45* (53); Emma Kearney 1/11 (4 overs) |

Perth Scorchers won by 33 runs
Lilac Hill, Perth
Umpires: Hennie Botes and Nathan Johnstone
Player of the match: Katherine Brunt (Scorchers)

- Melbourne Stars won the toss and elected to field
- Streamed by cricket.com.au

Match 51
20 January
17:30 (D/N)
Scorecard

| Melbourne Stars; 6/98 (12 overs) | v | Hobart Hurricanes; 3/115 (14 overs) |
| Emma Inglis 51 (31); Brooke Hepburn 2/14 (2 overs) | | Heather Knight 45 (31); Emma Kearney 1/19 (3 overs) |

Melbourne Stars won by 4 wickets (D/L method)
Blundstone Arena, Hobart
Umpires: Darren Close and Harvey Wolff
Player of the match: Emma Inglis (Stars)

- Melbourne Stars won the toss and elected to field
- Melbourne Stars' target revised to 98 runs from 12 overs following a rain delay
- Streamed by cricket.com.au

Match 54
21 January
11:45
Scorecard

| Hobart Hurricanes; 6/136 (19.5 overs) | v | Melbourne Stars; 8/135 (20 overs) |
| Heather Knight 35 (26); Kristen Beams 3/11 (4 overs) | | Meg Lanning 81 (55); Hayley Matthews 2/23 (3 overs) |

Hobart Hurricanes won by 4 wickets (with 1 ball remaining)
Blundstone Arena, Hobart
Umpires: Muhammad Qureshi and David Shepard
Player of the match: Meg Lanning (Stars)

- Melbourne Stars won the toss and elected to bat
- Double header with BBL game
- Broadcast by Network Ten
