= 2016–17 Sydney Thunder WBBL season =

Sydney Thunder
2016–17 season
- Coach: (Australia) Joanne Broadbent
- Captain(s): (Australia) Alex Blackwell
- Home ground: Sydney Showground Stadium
- WBBL Season: 6th
- WBBL Finals: DNQ

The 2016–17 Sydney Thunder WBBL season was the second in the team's history. Coached by Joanne Broadbent and captained by Alex Blackwell, the team competed in the WBBL|02 tournament.

At the conclusion of the group stage, the Thunder team was sixth on the table, and therefore did not qualify for the knockout phase.

== Squad ==
The following is the Thunder women squad for WBBL|02. Players with international caps are listed in bold.

No.	Name	Nat.	Birth date	Batting style	Bowling style	Notes
Batsmen
	**Alex Blackwell**	(Australia)	31 August 1983 (age 42)	Right-handed	Right arm medium	Team's Captain
	Mikayla Hinkley	(Australia)	1 May 1998 (age 27)	Right-handed	Right arm medium	
	Konio Oala	(Papua New Guinea)				Associate Rookie
All-rounders
	**Nicola Carey**	(Australia)	10 September 1993 (age 32)	Left-handed	Right arm medium	
	Stefanie Daffara	(Australia)	13 June 1995 (age 30)	Right-handed	Right arm medium	
	**Rachael Haynes**	(Australia)	26 December 1986 (age 39)	Left-handed	Left arm medium	
	**Naomi Stalenberg**	(Australia)	18 April 1994 (age 31)	Right-handed	Right arm medium	
	**Stafanie Taylor**	(Jamaica)	11 June 1991 (age 34)	Right-handed	Right arm off spin	Overseas international
	**Harmanpreet Kaur**	(India)	8 March 1989 (age 37)	Right-handed	Right arm fast medium	Overseas international
Wicketkeepers
	Claire Koski	(Australia)	13 March 1991 (age 35)	Right-handed		
Pace bowlers
	**Lauren Cheatle**	(Australia)	6 November 1998 (age 27)	Left-handed	Left arm fast medium	
	**Rene Farrell**	(Australia)	13 January 1987 (age 39)	Right-handed	Right arm fast medium	
	**Belinda Vakarewa**	(Australia)	22 January 1998 (age 28)	Right-handed	Right arm fast medium	
Spin bowlers
	Samantha Bates	(Australia)		Left-handed	Left-arm orthodox spin	
	Maisy Gibson	(Australia)	14 September 1996 (age 29)	Left-handed	Leg spin	
	**Erin Osborne**	(Australia)	27 June 1989 (age 36)	Right-handed	Right arm off spin	

== Ladder ==
Pos	Team	Pld	W	L	NR	Ded	Pts	NRR
1	Sydney Sixers (C)	14	9	5	0	0	18	0.442
2	Perth Scorchers (RU)	14	8	6	0	0	16	0.300
3	Brisbane Heat	14	8	6	0	0	16	0.046
4	Hobart Hurricanes	14	7	6	1	0	15	−0.034
5	Melbourne Stars	14	7	7	0	0	14	0.256
6	Sydney Thunder	14	6	7	1	0	13	−0.046
7	Melbourne Renegades	14	6	8	0	0.5	11.5	−0.519
8	Adelaide Strikers	14	3	9	2	0	8	−0.541

- The top four teams qualified for the play-off phase.

== Fixtures ==
=== Group stage ===
Match 3
10 December
18:15 (D/N)
Scorecard

Sydney Thunder; 4/141 (20 overs)	v	Melbourne Stars; 8/147 (20 overs)
Harmanpreet Kaur 47* (28); Alana King 2/21 (4 overs)		Emma Inglis 46 (28); Erin Osborne 3/27 (4 overs)

Melbourne Stars won by 6 runs
North Sydney Oval
Umpires: Claire Polosak and Tony Wilds
Player of the match: Emma Inglis (Stars)

- Melbourne Stars won the toss and elected to bat
- Streamed on cricket.com.au; broadcast by Network Ten

Match 8
13 December
10:00
Scorecard

Melbourne Stars; 9/116 (20 overs)	v	Sydney Thunder; 2/121 (18.5 overs)
Jess Cameron 36 (39); Harmanpreet Kaur 4/27 (4 overs)		Rachael Haynes 35 (31); Gemma Triscari 1/10 (3 overs)

Sydney Thunder won by 8 wickets (with 7 balls remaining)
Lavington Sports Ground, Albury
Umpires: Kumar Jeyakkumar and Deanne Young
Player of the match: Harmanpreet Kaur (Stars)

- Melbourne Stars won the toss and elected to bat
- Streamed on cricket.com.au

Match 9
16 December
14:00
Scorecard

Sydney Thunder	v	Adelaide Strikers

Match abandoned
Howell Oval, Sydney

- Persistent rain meant the match was abandoned without a ball bowled.
- Streamed on cricket.com.au

Match 12
17 December
14:00
Scorecard

Adelaide Strikers; 4/103 (17.5 overs)	v	Sydney Thunder; 5/102 (20 overs)
Sophie Devine 44 (33); Suzie Bates 2/14 (4 overs)		Rene Farrell 29* (26); Tahlia McGrath 2/21 (4 overs)

Adelaide Strikers won by 6 wickets (with 13 balls remaining)
Howell Oval, Sydney
Umpires: T Penman and Claire Polosak
Player of the match: Sophie Devine

- Sydney Thunder won the toss and elected to bat
- Streamed on cricket.com.au

Match 18
26 December
14:00
Scorecard

Melbourne Renegades; 4/110 (20 overs)	v	Sydney Thunder; 2/114 (15.5 overs)
Kate Britt 50 (52); Samantha Bates 2/22 (4 overs)		Alex Blackwell 61* (38); Lea Tahuhu 1/14 (4 overs)

Sydney Thunder won by 8 wickets (with 25 balls remaining)
Blacktown International Sportspark, Sydney
Umpires: Anthony Hobson and Dinusha Bandara
Player of the match: Alex Blackwell (Thunder)

- Sydney Thunder won the toss and elected to field
- Streamed on cricket.com.au

Match 21
27 December
14:00
Scorecard

Sydney Thunder; 2/96 (11.4 overs)	v	Melbourne Renegades; 6/93 (20 overs)
Danielle Wyatt 26 (21); Erin Osborne 3/23 (4 overs)		Stafanie Taylor 48 (37); Molly Strano 3/15 (3 overs)

Sydney Thunder won by 8 wickets (with 56 balls remaining)
Blacktown International Sportspark, Sydney
Umpires: Anthony Hobson and Yohan Ramasundara
Player of the match: Stafanie Taylor (Thunder)

- Sydney Thunder won the toss and elected to field
- Streamed on cricket.com.au

Match 23
28 December
14:35
Scorecard

Sydney Thunder; 7/131 (20 overs)	v	Sydney Sixers; 3/164 (20 overs)
Erin Osborne 32 (30); Marizanne Kapp 2/29 (4 overs)		Alyssa Healy 55 (38); Rachael Haynes 1/11 (2 overs)

Sydney Sixers won by 33 runs
Spotless Stadium, Sydney
Umpires: Mark Nickl and T Penman
Player of the match: Alyssa Healy (Sixers)

- Sydney Thunder won the toss and chose to field
- Double header with BBL game
- Streamed on cricket.com.au

Match 28
2 January
13:00
Scorecard

Brisbane Heat; 9/129 (20 overs)	v	Sydney Thunder; 8/132 (20 overs)
Beth Mooney 34 (40); Nicola Carey & Samantha Bates 2/18 (4 overs)		Rachael Haynes 40 (29); Haidee Birkett 2/25 (4 overs)

Sydney Thunder won by 3 runs
Blacktown International Sportspark, Sydney
Umpires: Marc Nickl and T Penman
Player of the match: Samantha Bates (Heat)

- Brisbane Heat won the toss and elected to field
- Sydney Thunder was penalised 1 point for slow over rate
- Streamed on cricket.com.au

Match 30
3 January
13:00
Scorecard

Sydney Thunder; 8/115 (20 overs)	v	Brisbane Heat; 1/117 (18.5 overs)
Alex Blackwell 43 (49); Kara Sutherland 3/5 (2 overs)		Beth Mooney 75* (66)

Brisbane Heat won by 9 wickets (with 7 balls remaining)
Blacktown International Sportspark, Sydney
Umpires: Marc Nickl and T Penman
Player of the match: Beth Mooney (Heat)

- Sydney Thunder won the toss and elected to bat
- Streamed on cricket.com.au

Match 34
5 January
18:30 (D/N)
Scorecard

Sydney Thunder; 9/127 (20 overs)	v	Hobart Hurricanes; 3/171 (20 overs)
Harmanpreet Kaur 32 (32); Brooke Hepburn 2/20 (4 overs)		Heather Knight 47 (29); Rene Farrell 1/19 (3 overs)

Hobart Hurricanes won by 44 runs
University of Tasmania Stadium, Launceston
Umpires: Darren Close and Muhammad Qureshi
Player of the match: Heather Knight (Hurricanes)

- Hobart Hurricanes won the toss and elected to bat
- Streamed on cricket.com.au

Match 44
14 January
13:45
Scorecard

Sydney Sixers; 7/138 (20 overs)	v	Sydney Thunder; 6/138 (20 overs)
Ashleigh Gardner 54 (41); Rene Farrell 3/26 (4 overs)		Stafanie Taylor 68 (51); Lisa Sthalekar 2/19 (2 overs)

Sydney Thunder won in Super Over
Sydney Cricket Ground
Umpires: Claire Polosak and Tony Wilds
Player of the match: Stafanie Taylor (Thunder)

- Sydney Sixers won the toss and elected to bat
- Double header with BBL game
- Broadcast by Network Ten

Match 48
16 January
18:30 (D/N)
Scorecard

Hobart Hurricanes; 4/117 (18.2 overs)	v	Sydney Thunder; 9/115 (20 overs)
Erin Burns 38 (33); Harmanpreet Kaur 2/18 (4 overs)		Alex Blackwell 49 (50); Amy Satterthwaite 5/17 (4 overs)

Hobart Hurricanes won by 6 wickets (with 10 balls remaining)
Blundstone Arena, Hobart
Umpires: Muhammad Qureshi and Harvey Wolff
Player of the match: Amy Satterthwaite (Hurricanes)

- Sydney Thunder won the toss and elected to bat
- Streamed by cricket.com.au

Match 50
20 January
14:00
Scorecard

Perth Scorchers; 5/149 (20 overs)	v	Sydney Thunder; 6/145 (20 overs)
Elyse Villani 74 (55); Nicola Carey 2/15 (2 overs)		Harmanpreet Kaur 64* (37); Piepa Cleary 3/16 (4 overs)

Perth Scorchers won by 4 runs
Lilac Hill, Perth
Umpires: James Hewitt and Todd Rann
Player of the match: Elyse Villani (Scorchers)

- Sydney Thunder won the toss and elected to field
- Streamed by cricket.com.au

Match 56
21 January
14:00
Scorecard

Sydney Thunder; 5/134 (19.1 overs)	v	Perth Scorchers; 4/131 (20 overs)
Stafanie Taylor 62 (54); Elyse Villani 3/16 (2.1 overs)		Nicole Bolton 53 (43); Nicola Carey 2/30 (4 overs)

Sydney Thunder won by 5 wickets (with 5 balls remaining)
Lilac Hill, Perth
Umpires: James Hewitt and A Kovalevs
Player of the match: Stafanie Taylor (Thunder)

- Perth Scorchers won the toss and elected to bat
- Streamed by cricket.com.au
