= 2024–25 Adelaide Strikers WBBL season =

Adelaide Strikers
2024–25 season
- Adelaide Strikers 2022–23 cap logo
- Coach: Luke Williams
- Captain(s): Tahlia McGrath
- Home ground: Karen Rolton Oval
- League: WBBL
- Record: 7th

The 2024–25 Adelaide Strikers Women's season was the team's ninth season participating in the Women's Big Bash League. The team was coached by Luke Williams and captained by Tahlia McGrath. The Strikers came into the season having won the previous two editions of the tournament, looking to be the first WBBL to win the tournament three times in a row. The Strikers finished 7th for the season and did not play in the finals.

== Squad ==
As their pre-draft signing, the Strikers signed Indian batter Smriti Mandhana, making the Strikers the fourth WWBL team that Mandhana had played for, though she was set to miss the first few matches of the season due to an ODI series against New Zealand. The Strikers signed her in the silver category as opposed to the more lucrative platinum category. This meant that the Strikers were able to retain South African batter Laura Wolvaardt with their platinum selection in the WBBL draft when the Hobart Hurricanes tried to select her.

== Results ==
Match 1
27 October 2024
13:10 UTC+10:30
Scorecard

Adelaide Strikers; 5/133 (20 overs)	v	Brisbane Heat; 6/134 (18 overs)
Tahlia McGrath 51* (41); Shikha Pandey 2/14 (4 overs)		Charli Knott 44* (30); Megan Schutt 2/27 (4 overs)

Brisbane Heat won by 4 wickets
Adelaide Oval, Adelaide
Umpires: Eloise Sheridan (Aus) and Mary Waldron (Ire)
Player of the match: Charli Knott (Brisbane Heat)

- Brisbane Heat won the toss and elected to field.

The Strikers played in opening match of the season against the Brisbane Heat—a replay of the final from the previous season. The Strikers batted first, and Tahlia McGrath top-scored 51 not out, but the team struggled throughout the innings and only scored 133 runs in total. Brisbane chased the total down easily with 12 balls to spare.

Match 5
29 October 2024
18:10 UTC+11 (N)
Scorecard

Adelaide Strikers; 171 (20 overs)	v	Sydney Sixers; 9/160 (20 overs)
Bridget Patterson 44 (32); Ashleigh Gardner 4/32 (4 overs)		Sarah Bryce 62 (44); Anesu Mushangwe 3/27 (4 overs)

Adelaide Strikers won by 11 runs
North Sydney Oval, Sydney
Umpires: Roberto Howard (Aus) and Sharad Patel (Aus)
Player of the match: Amanda-Jade Wellington (Adelaide Strikers)

- Sydney Sixers won the toss and elected to field.

The Strikers secured their first win of the season against the Sydney Sixers, but at the cost of an injury to Bridget Patterson. While Patterson was wicket-keeping to the bowling of Darcie Brown, a delivery from Brown bounced awkwardly and struck Patterson near her right eye-socket. She left the ground and was replaced for the rest of the match by the Strikers' reserve wicket-keeper Ellie Johnston.

Match 8
1 November 2024
15:45 UTC+11 (D/N)
Scorecard

Sydney Thunder; 5/212 (20 overs)	v	Adelaide Strikers; 148 (19.2 overs)
Georgia Voll 92 (55); Orla Prendergast 3/35 (4 overs)		Katie Mack 51 (42); Samantha Bates 4/21 (4 overs)

Sydney Thunder won by 64 runs
North Sydney Oval, Sydney
Umpires: Mitchell Claydon (Aus) and Roberto Howard (Aus)
Player of the match: Georgia Voll (Sydney Thunder)

- Sydney Thunder won the toss and elected to bat.

Match 13
3 November 2024
13:40 UTC+11
Scorecard

Adelaide Strikers; 5/157 (20 overs)	v	Melbourne Renegades; 8/158 (20 overs)
Tahlia McGrath 64* (44); Sophie Molineux 2/39 (4 overs)		Sophie Molineux 64 (32); Jemma Barsby 2/17 (3 overs)

Melbourne Renegades won by 2 wickets
CitiPower Centre, Melbourne
Umpires: Clare Haysom (Aus) and Lisa McCabe (Aus)
Player of the match: Sophie Molineux (Melbourne Renegades)

- Adelaide Strikers won the toss and elected to bat.

Match 20
9 November 2024
18:15 UTC+10 (N)
Scorecard

Brisbane Heat; 6/175 (20 overs)	v	Adelaide Strikers; 4/167 (20 overs)
Jemimah Rodrigues 61 (40); Jemma Barsby 2/34 (4 overs)		Bridget Patterson 61* (47); Nadine de Klerk 1/6 (1 over)

Brisbane Heat won by 8 runs
The Gabba, Brisbane
Umpires: Stephen Dionysius (Aus) and Riki Wessels (Eng)
Player of the match: Jemimah Rodrigues (Brisbane Heat)

- Adelaide Strikers won the toss and elected to field.

Match 23
11 November 2024
17:40 UTC+10:30 (D/N)
Scorecard

Adelaide Strikers; 8/185 (20 overs)	v	Melbourne Renegades; 1/186 (17.1 overs)
Tahlia McGrath 49 (24); Hayley Matthews 2/28 (4 overs)		Hayley Matthews 85* (54); Darcie Brown 1/43 (4 overs)

Melbourne Renegades won by 9 wickets
Karen Rolton Oval, Adelaide
Umpires: Andrew Crozier (Aus) and Mary Waldron (Ire)
Player of the match: Hayley Matthews (Melbourne Renegades)

- Melbourne Renegades won the toss and elected to field.

Match 25
13 November 2024
18:10 UTC+11 (N)
Scorecard

Hobart Hurricanes; 2/191 (20 overs)	v	Adelaide Strikers; 3/163 (20 overs)
Lizelle Lee 103 (59); Megan Schutt 1/21 (4 overs)		Laura Wolvaardt 63* (40); Amy Smith 1/16 (4 overs)

Hobart Hurricanes won by 28 runs
Bellerive Oval, Hobart
Umpires: Claire Polosak (Aus) and David Taylor (Aus)
Player of the match: Lizelle Lee (Hobart Hurricanes)

- Adelaide Strikers won the toss and elected to field.

Match 29
16 November 2024
15:00 UTC+10:30 (D/N)
Scorecard

Adelaide Strikers; 7/140 (20 overs)	v	Hobart Hurricanes; 102 (15.2 overs)
Madeline Penna 60 (40); Amy Smith 3/18 (4 overs)		Elyse Villani 44 (39); Tahlia McGrath 4/13 (3.2 overs)

Adelaide Strikers won by 38 runs
Adelaide Oval, Adelaide
Umpires: Peter George (Aus) and Mary Waldron (Ire)
Player of the match: Madeline Penna (Adelaide Strikers)

- Adelaide Strikers won the toss and elected to bat.

Match 32
19 November 2024
17:40 UTC+10:30 (D/N)
Scorecard

Adelaide Strikers; 6/169 (20 overs)	v	Perth Scorchers; 8/139 (20 overs)
Laura Wolvaardt 48 (28); Alana King 3/29 (4 overs)		Brooke Halliday 47 (44); Megan Schutt 3/19 (4 overs)

Adelaide Strikers won by 30 runs
Karen Rolton Oval, Adelaide
Umpires: Daryl Brigham (Aus) and David Taylor (Aus)
Player of the match: Megan Schutt (Adelaide Strikers)

- Perth Scorchers won the toss and elected to field.

Match 39
24 November 2024
10:00 UTC+11
Scorecard

Melbourne Stars	v	Adelaide Strikers

Match abandoned
CitiPower Centre, Melbourne
Umpires: Chris Grant (Aus) and Lisa McCabe (Aus)

- No toss.
- Rain prevented any play.

== Standings ==
Pos	Team	Pld	W	L	T	NR	Pts	NRR	
1	Melbourne Renegades (C)	10	7	3	0	0	14	0.527	Advance to the play-off phase
2	Brisbane Heat (R)	10	7	3	0	0	14	0.384	Advance to the play-off phase
3	Sydney Thunder (3rd)	10	6	3	0	1	13	−0.002	Advance to the play-off phase
4	Hobart Hurricanes (4th)	10	5	5	0	0	10	0.189	Advance to the play-off phase
5	Perth Scorchers	10	4	5	1	0	9	−0.171	
6	Sydney Sixers	10	3	5	1	1	8	−0.477	
7	Adelaide Strikers	10	3	6	0	1	7	−0.357	
8	Melbourne Stars	10	2	7	0	1	5	−0.205	

Source: ESPNcricinfo
(C) Champions; (R) Runners-up
