= 2016–17 Hobart Hurricanes WBBL season =

Hobart Hurricanes
2016–17 season
- Coach: (Australia) Julia Price
- Captain(s): (England) Heather Knight
- Home ground: Aurora Stadium; Blundstone Arena; Kingston Twin Ovals
- WBBL Season: 4th
- WBBL Finals: Semi-finalist

The 2016–17 Hobart Hurricanes WBBL season was the second in the team's history. Coached by Julia Price and captained by Heather Knight, the team competed in the WBBL|02 competition.

At the conclusion of the group stage, the Hurricanes team was fourth on the ladder. The Hurricanes then lost to eventual WBBL|02 champions the Sydney Sixers in a semi-final to finish in equal third place (with the Brisbane Heat).

== Squad ==
The following is the Hurricanes women squad for WBBL|02. Players with international caps are listed in bold.

No.	Name	Nat.	Birth date	Batting style	Bowling style	Notes
Batsmen
	**Gaby Lewis**	(Ireland)	27 March 2001 (age 24)	Right-handed	Right-arm leg break	Associate Rookie
99	Sasha Moloney	(Australia)	14 July 1992 (age 33)	Right-handed		
20	**Amy Satterthwaite**	(New Zealand)	7 October 1986 (age 39)	Left-handed	Right-arm medium	Overseas international
74	Emma Thompson	(Australia)	2 December 1990 (age 35)	Right-handed	Right-arm medium	
All-rounders
29	Erin Burns	(Australia)	22 June 1988 (age 37)	Right-handed	Right-arm fast medium	
27	Corinne Hall	(Australia)	12 October 1987 (age 38)	Right-handed	Right-arm off break	
12	Brooke Hepburn	(Australia)	4 October 1990 (age 35)	Right-handed	Right-arm medium	
5	**Heather Knight**	(England)	26 December 1990 (age 35)	Right-handed	Right-arm medium	Captain / Overseas international
	**Hayley Matthews**	(Barbados)	19 March 1998 (age 27)	Right-handed	Right-arm off break	Overseas international
10	Meg Phillips	(Australia)	2 February 1996 (age 30)	Right-handed	Right-arm medium	
4	Veronica Pyke	(Australia)	4 November 1981 (age 44)	Right-handed	Left-arm medium	
2	Celeste Raack	(Australia)	18 May 1994 (age 31)	Right-handed	Right-arm leg break	
Wicketkeepers
	Georgia Redmayne	(Australia)	8 December 1993 (age 32)	Left-handed		
Bowlers
9	Katelyn Fryett	(Australia)	28 May 1992 (age 33)	Right-handed	Right-arm fast medium	
11	**Julie Hunter**	(Australia)	15 March 1984 (age 41)	Right-handed	Right-arm medium	

== Ladder ==
Pos	Team	Pld	W	L	NR	Ded	Pts	NRR
1	Sydney Sixers (C)	14	9	5	0	0	18	0.442
2	Perth Scorchers (RU)	14	8	6	0	0	16	0.300
3	Brisbane Heat	14	8	6	0	0	16	0.046
4	Hobart Hurricanes	14	7	6	1	0	15	−0.034
5	Melbourne Stars	14	7	7	0	0	14	0.256
6	Sydney Thunder	14	6	7	1	0	13	−0.046
7	Melbourne Renegades	14	6	8	0	0.5	11.5	−0.519
8	Adelaide Strikers	14	3	9	2	0	8	−0.541

- The top four teams qualified for the play-off phase.

== Fixtures ==
=== Group stage ===
Match 1
10 December
10:00
Scorecard

Hobart Hurricanes; 5/120 (19 overs)	v	Perth Scorchers; 6/119 (20 overs)
Hayley Matthews 48 (38); Suzie Bates 2/14 (3 overs)		Katherine Brunt 41 (24); Heather Knight 2/31 (4 overs)

Hobart Hurricanes won by 5 wickets (with 6 balls remaining)
North Sydney Oval No. 2
Umpires: Glen Stubbings and Marc Nickl
Player of the match: Hayley Matthews (Hurricanes)

- Hobart Hurricanes won the toss and elected to field
- Streamed on cricket.com.au

Match 5
11 December
10:45
Scorecard

Perth Scorchers; 4/142 (20 overs)	v	Hobart Hurricanes; 9/125 (20 overs)
Elyse Villani 54 (45); Hayley Matthews 2/19 (4 overs)		Veronica Pyke 27* (15); Katherine Brunt 2/18 (4 overs)

Perth Scorchers won by 17 runs
North Sydney Oval
Umpires: Donovan Koch and Simon Lightbody
Player of the match: Elyse Villani (Scorchers)

- Perth Scorchers won the toss and elected to bat
- Streamed on cricket.com.au; broadcast by Network Ten

Match 13
17 December
16:10
Scorecard

Melbourne Renegades; 5/130 (20 overs)	v	Hobart Hurricanes; 4/133 (20 overs)
Kris Britt 51* (49); Amy Satterthwaite 2/22 (4 overs)		Amy Satterthwaite 45* (43); Grace Harris 1/15 (4 overs)

Hobart Hurricanes won by 3 runs
Queen Elizabeth Oval, Bendigo
Umpires: Daryl Brigham and Stephen Brne
Player of the match: Amy Satterthwaite

- Melbourne Renegades won the toss and elected to field
- Streamed on cricket.com.au

Match 15
18 December
12:00
Scorecard

Hobart Hurricanes; 5/121 (20 overs)	v	Melbourne Renegades; 6/121 (20 overs)
Amy Satterthwaite 52* (41); Molly Strano 1/14 (4 overs)		Kris Britt 36 (37); Hayley Matthews 4/23 (4 overs)

Hobart Hurricanes won in the super over
Queen Elizabeth Oval, Bendigo
Umpires: Daryl Brigham and Stephen Brne
Player of the match: Amy Satterthwaite

- Melbourne Renegades won the toss and elected to field
- Streamed on cricket.com.au

Match 19
26 December
14:00
Scorecard

Adelaide Strikers; 3/146 (16.3 overs)	v	Hobart Hurricanes; 3/143 (20 overs)
Sophie Devine 103* (48); Veronica Pyke 1/21 (3 overs)		Holly Knight 69 (47); Megan Schutt 1/15 (4 overs)

Adelaide Strikers won by 7 wickets (with 21 balls remaining)
Gliderol Stadium, Adelaide
Umpires: Luke Uthenwoldt and Cain Kemp
Player of the match: Sophie Devine (Strikers)

- Adelaide Strikers won the toss and elected to field
- Streamed on cricket.com.au

Match 22
27 December
14:00
Scorecard

Hobart Hurricanes	v	Adelaide Strikers

Match abandoned
Gliderol Stadium, Adelaide

- Match was washed out, Strikers second washout for the season
- Streamed on cricket.com.au

Match 24
29 December
14:30
Scorecard

Sydney Sixers; 3/110 (18.2 overs)	v	Hobart Hurricanes; 8/106 (20 overs)
Hayley Matthews 27 (33); Sarah Aley 3/13 (3 overs)		Ellyse Perry 44* (44); Hayley Matthews 2/20 (3.2 overs)

Sydney Sixers won by 7 wickets (with 10 balls remaining)
Hurstville Oval, Sydney
Umpires: Anthony Hobson and T Penman
Player of the match: Sarah Aley (Sixers)

- Hobart Hurricanes won the toss and elected to bat
- Streamed on cricket.com.au

Match 34
5 January
18:30 (D/N)
Scorecard

Sydney Thunder; 9/127 (20 overs)	v	Hobart Hurricanes; 3/171 (20 overs)
Harmanpreet Kaur 32 (32); Brooke Hepburn 2/20 (4 overs)		Heather Knight 47 (29); Rene Farrell 1/19 (3 overs)

Hobart Hurricanes won by 44 runs
University of Tasmania Stadium, Launceston
Umpires: Darren Close and Muhammad Qureshi
Player of the match: Heather Knight (Hurricanes)

- Hobart Hurricanes won the toss and elected to bat
- Streamed on cricket.com.au

Match 36
8 January
13:45
Scorecard

Hobart Hurricanes; 8/138 (20 overs)	v	Brisbane Heat; 2/153 (20 overs)
Amy Satterthwaite 57 (48); Jemma Barsby 3/34 (4 overs)		Beth Mooney 78* (60); Amy Satterthwaite 1/18 (4 overs)

Brisbane Heat won by 15 runs
Blundstone Arena, Hobart
Umpires: Darren Close and Simon Lightbody
Player of the match: Beth Mooney (Heat)

- Brisbane Heat won the toss and elected to bat.
- Double header with BBL game
- Streamed on cricket.com.au; broadcast by Network Ten

Match 39
9 January
18:30 (D/N)
Scorecard

Brisbane Heat; 122 (19.4 overs)	v	Hobart Hurricanes; 2/123 (18.2 overs)
Smriti Mandhana 40 (33); Hayley Matthews 5/19 (3.4 overs)		Georgia Redmayne 64* (50); Jess Jonassen 1/16 (4 overs)

Hobart Hurricanes won by 8 wickets (with 10 balls remaining)
Blundstone Arena, Hobart
Umpires: Darren Close and Muhammad Qureshi
Player of the match: Hayley Matthews (Hurricanes)

- Brisbane Heat won the toss and chose to bat
- Streamed on cricket.com.au

Match 41
13 January
14:30
Scorecard

Hobart Hurricanes; 8/118 (20 overs)	v	Sydney Sixers; 6/134 (20 overs)
Corinne Hall 42 (43); Sarah Aley 3/20 (4 overs)		Ellyse Perry 60 (54); Julie Hunter 2/13 (4 overs)

Sydney Sixers won by 16 runs
North Sydney Oval
Umpires: G Stubbings and Ben Treloar
Player of the match: Ellyse Perry (Sixers)

- Hobart Hurricanes won the toss and elected to field
- Streamed on cricket.com.au

Match 48
16 January
18:30 (D/N)
Scorecard

Hobart Hurricanes; 4/117 (18.2 overs)	v	Sydney Thunder; 9/115 (20 overs)
Erin Burns 38 (33); Harmanpreet Kaur 2/18 (4 overs)		Alex Blackwell 49 (50); Amy Satterthwaite 5/17 (4 overs)

Hobart Hurricanes won by 6 wickets (with 10 balls remaining)
Blundstone Arena, Hobart
Umpires: Muhammad Qureshi and Harvey Wolff
Player of the match: Amy Satterthwaite (Hurricanes)

- Sydney Thunder won the toss and elected to bat
- Streamed by cricket.com.au

Match 51
20 January
17:30 (D/N)
Scorecard

Melbourne Stars; 6/98 (12 overs)	v	Hobart Hurricanes; 3/115 (14 overs)
Emma Inglis 51 (31); Brooke Hepburn 2/14 (2 overs)		Heather Knight 45 (31); Emma Kearney 1/19 (3 overs)

Melbourne Stars won by 4 wickets (D/L method)
Blundstone Arena, Hobart
Umpires: Darren Close and Harvey Wolff
Player of the match: Emma Inglis (Stars)

- Melbourne Stars won the toss and elected to field
- Melbourne Stars' target revised to 98 runs from 12 overs following a rain delay
- Streamed by cricket.com.au

Match 54
21 January
11:45
Scorecard

Hobart Hurricanes; 6/136 (19.5 overs)	v	Melbourne Stars; 8/135 (20 overs)
Heather Knight 35 (26); Kristen Beams 3/11 (4 overs)		Meg Lanning 81 (55); Hayley Matthews 2/23 (3 overs)

Hobart Hurricanes won by 4 wickets (with 1 ball remaining)
Blundstone Arena, Hobart
Umpires: Muhammad Qureshi and David Shepard
Player of the match: Meg Lanning (Stars)

- Melbourne Stars won the toss and elected to bat
- Double header with BBL game
- Broadcast by Network Ten

=== Knockout phase ===
==== Semi-final ====
25 January
13:40
Scorecard

Sydney Sixers; 6/169 (20 overs)	v	Hobart Hurricanes; 66 (14.1 overs)
Alyssa Healy 77 (45); Erin Burns 2/26 (4 overs)		Erin Burns 14 (15); Ashleigh Gardner 2/9 (3 overs)

Sydney Sixers won by 103 runs
The Gabba, Brisbane
Umpires: Phillip Gillespie and Tony Wilds
Player of the match: Alyssa Healy (Sixers)

- Sydney Sixers won the toss and elected to bat
- Was played as a double header prior to Semi Final 2 of the Men's BBL. Both matches were broadcast by Network Ten.
