= Courtney Neale =

Australian cricketer (born 1998)

Personal information
- Full name: Courtney Belle Neale
- Born: 4 July 1998 (age 28); Officer, Victoria, Australia
- Height: 1.78 m (5 ft 10 in)
- Batting: Right-handed
- Bowling: Right-arm medium-fast
- Role: Bowler

Domestic team information
- Years: Team
- 2018/19–2020/21: Victoria
- 2020/21: Melbourne Renegades
- 2023/24–present: South Australia (squad no. 86)
- 2024/25–present: Adelaide Strikers (squad no. 86)

Career statistics
Competition	WLA	WT20
Matches	21	7
Runs scored	44	9
Batting average	6.28	9.00
100s/50s	0/0	0/0
Top score	16*	5
Balls bowled	792	78
Wickets	16	7
Bowling average	41.06	16.00
5 wickets in innings	0	0
10 wickets in match	0	0
Best bowling	3/31	2/24
Catches/stumpings	5/–	3/–
- Source: CricketArchive, 20 October 2024

Courtney Belle Neale (born 4 July 1998) is an Australian cricketer who plays as a right-arm medium-fast bowler for South Australia and the Adelaide Strikers. In addition to cricket, Neale played Australian rules football for the Norwood Football Club women's team during the 2023 SANFLW season.

== Career ==
Neale played in three matches for Melbourne Renegades in the 2020–21 WBBL season and three matches for Victoria in the 2020–21 WNCL season. She was in the Western Australia squad for the 2021–22 WNCL season before reluctantly terminating her contract due to covid border closures.

Following a break from the game, Neale joined the South Australia women's squad for the 2023–24 Women's National Cricket League season. In October 2023, Neale was named in the Adelaide Strikers squad ahead of the 2023–24 Women's Big Bash League season.
