= Tess Cooper =

Australian cricketer

Personal information
- Full name: Tess Margaret Cooper
- Born: 27 September 1996 (age 30); Townsville, Queensland, Australia
- Batting: Right-handed
- Bowling: Right-arm medium
- Role: Batter

Domestic team information
- Years: Team
- 2016/17–2018/19: Queensland (squad no. 36)
- 2016/17–2017/18: Brisbane Heat (squad no. 36)
- 2020/21: Queensland (squad no. 36)
- 2021/22: Adelaide Strikers

Career statistics
Competition	WLA	WT20
Matches	10	1
Runs scored	130	1
Batting average	13.00	1.00
100s/50s	0/0	0/0
Top score	35	1
Catches/stumpings	1/–	0/–
- Source: CricketArchive, 17 March 2021

Tess Margaret Cooper (born 27 September 1996) is an Australian cricketer who played as a right-handed batter and occasional right-arm medium bowler for Queensland Fire in the Women's National Cricket League (WNCL) and Brisbane Heat in the Women's Big Bash League (WBBL).

Originally from Emerald, Queensland, Cooper spent much time as a child watching on television with her father. Her favourite players were Michael Hussey and Adam Gilchrist. At the age of 10, she started playing club cricket in Emerald, and she later played for Capricornia, followed by Queensland under-age teams.

At 15, Cooper moved to Brisbane, where she was selected in the Sandgate-Redcliffe first grade women's team. While in Year 12 at school, she was invited to several training sessions with Queensland Fire. For several years, she was named as a rookie with the squad, and in 2014–15 was a member of the Queensland Country women's team that finished third in the inaugural national championships. The following season, 2015–16, she was a Queensland Academy of Sport player.

In June 2016, Cooper was contracted by the Fire for the 2016–17 Women's National Cricket League season. In November 2016, she recorded her maiden century, a score of 118 for Sandgate-Redcliffe against Valleys in the Katherine Raymont Shield. Soon afterwards, she backed that up with 82 in the same competition. On 18 November 2016, she made her debut for the Fire, scoring 35 against the ACT Meteors. To cap off a whirlwind month, she was once again selected to play for the Queensland Country women's team in the national championships.

In December 2016, Cooper was signed up by Brisbane Heat for its WBBL|02 campaign. She made her Heat debut on 17 December 2016 against the Perth Scorchers.

She was released by Queensland Fire on 24 May 2021.

She was signed as a temporary replacement player by Adelaide Strikers during the 2021–22 WBBL.

Cooper is a granddaughter of rugby league and racing identity Les Geeves. As of 2016, she was studying physiotherapy at Australian Catholic University.
