= Rhiannon Dick =

Australian cricketer (born 1990)

Personal information
- Full name: Rhiannon Sarah Dick
- Born: 21 September 1990 (age 36); Bankstown, New South Wales, Australia
- Batting: Left-handed
- Bowling: Slow left-arm orthodox
- Role: All-rounder

Domestic team information
- Years: Team
- 2010/11–2014/15: Australian Capital Territory
- 2012: Kent
- 2015/16–2016/17: Sydney Sixers
- 2017/18: Adelaide Strikers

Career statistics
| Competition | WLA | WT20 |
|---|---|---|
| Matches | 34 | 75 |
| Runs scored | 394 | 501 |
| Batting average | 24.62 | 14.73 |
| 100s/50s | 0/2 | 0/1 |
| Top score | 62 | 71* |
| Balls bowled | 1,344 | 977 |
| Wickets | 36 | 42 |
| Bowling average | 23.80 | 23.33 |
| 5 wickets in innings | 0 | 1 |
| 10 wickets in match | 0 | 0 |
| Best bowling | 3/27 | 6/14 |
| Catches/stumpings | 9/– | 10/– |
- Source: CricketArchive, 29 June 2021

Rhiannon Sarah Dick (born 21 September 1990) is a former Australian cricketer. She is an all-rounder who bats left-handed and bowls slow left-arm orthodox. A member of the New South Wales cricket academy, Dick played List A and T20 cricket for the Australian Capital Territory (2010/11–2014/15) and Kent (2012). In the Women's Big Bash League (WBBL), she played for the Sydney Sixers during the 2015–16 and 2016–17 seasons, as well as the Adelaide Strikers during the 2017–18 season.

Dick lined up for Cricket Australia Women's XI for two T20 matches against the West Indies in 2014. She was also selected to represent an Australian XI against New Zealand for two T20 matches in 2015.

Dick was born in Bankstown, Sydney, New South Wales. As of 2020, she works as a physiotherapist.
