= Lily Bardsley =

Australian cricketer (born 1995)

Personal information
- Full name: Lily F Bardsley
- Born: 7 August 1995 (age 31); Newcastle, New South Wales, Australia
- Batting: Right-handed
- Role: Wicket-keeper

Domestic team information
- Years: Team
- 2015/16–2016/17: Australian Capital Territory
- 2016/17: Melbourne Stars

Career statistics
Competition	WLA	WT20
Matches	7	7
Runs scored	75	5
Batting average	15.00	2.50
100s/50s	0/0	0/0
Top score	38*	5
Catches/stumpings	1/0	1/0
- Source: CricketArchive, 29 June 2021

Lily F Bardsley (born 7 August 1995) is an Australian cricketer. She is a wicket-keeper and right-handed batter. During 2015/16–2016/17, Bardsley played seven List A matches for the Australian Capital Territory in the Women's National Cricket League (WNCL) and seven T20 matches for the Melbourne Stars in the Women's Big Bash League (WBBL).
