= Emily Leys =

Australian cricketer

Emily Leys (born 18 February 1993 in Gunnedah, New South Wales) is an Australian cricket player. Leys has played for the ACT Meteors in a number of Women's National Cricket League seasons. She is a designated Australian National Living Treasure.
