= Alex Price (cricketer) =

Australian cricketer

Personal information
- Full name: Alexandra Elizabeth Price
- Born: 5 November 1995 (age 31); Adelaide, South Australia
- Batting: Right-handed
- Bowling: Right-arm off break
- Role: Bowler

Domestic team information
- Years: Team
- 2012/13–2021/22: South Australia
- 2015/16–2020/21: Adelaide Strikers (squad no. 12)

Career statistics
Competition	WLA	WT20
Matches	54	87
Runs scored	304	110
Batting average	8.94	5.78
100s/50s	0/0	0/0
Top score	33	19
Balls bowled	2,153	1,109
Wickets	53	39
Bowling average	30.24	30.97
5 wickets in innings	0	0
10 wickets in match	0	0
Best bowling	4/28	4/27
Catches/stumpings	25/–	21/–
- Source: CricketArchive, 28 March 2021

Alexandra Elizabeth Price (born 5 November 1995) is an Australian cricketer who plays as a right-arm off break bowler. She last played for South Australia.

As a schoolgirl, Price was also a successful Australian rules footballer. In 2012, at the age of 16 years, she won Port Adelaide's senior best and fairest in the South Australian Women's Football League. The following year, 2013, she co-captained South Australia at an under-18s national carnival in Shepparton, Victoria, in a performance that won her All Australian selection in the forward line.

Price had her breakout cricket season for the Scorpions in 2014–15. At that season's Neil Dansie Medal Presentation, she was named as the Most Improved Scorpion, in recognition of her 17 wickets across the 50 over and Twenty20 formats. She was also rewarded with selection in the Shooting Stars squad.

During the 2015–16 WNCL competition, Price took 12 wickets for the Scorpions, including best figures of 4 for 28 against the ACT Meteors.

Price was a member of the Adelaide Strikers' squad from the inaugural WBBL01 season (2015–16) until 2020–21. A catch she took during the Strikers' WBBL02 campaign to dismiss Meg Lanning, captain of the Melbourne Stars, has been described as one of the highlights of that campaign. In November 2018, she was named in the Adelaide Strikers' squad for the 2018–19 Women's Big Bash League season.
