= Luke Williams (cricketer) =

Australian cricket coach (born 1979)

Personal information
- Born: 24 December 1979 (age 46); Adelaide, Australia
- Source: Cricinfo, 30 September 2020

Luke Williams (born 24 December 1979) is an Australian cricket coach and former cricketer.

== Career ==
Williams played in five first-class matches for South Australia in 2000/01.

In 2006, Williams received Bradman Medal for South Australian Grade Cricketer of the Year. Following his playing career, he became the coach of the South Australian Scorpions and the Adelaide Strikers in the Women's Big Bash League.

In 2023, Royal Challengers Bangalore appointed him as the head coach of their women's team for the second season of the Women's Premier League (WPL).

== See also ==
- List of South Australian representative cricketers
