= Kris Britt =

Australian cricketer

Personal information
- Full name: Kris Lynsey Britt
- Born: 13 April 1983 (age 43); Canberra, Australian Capital Territory
- Batting: Right-handed
- Bowling: Right-arm leg-spin
- Role: All-rounder

International information
- National side: Australia
- Only Test (cap 144): 22 February 2003 v England
- ODI debut (cap 96): 26 January 2003 v New Zealand
- Last ODI: 11 February 2008 v England
- T20I debut (cap 17): 19 July 2007 v New Zealand
- Last T20I: 1 February 2008 v England

Domestic team information
- Years: Team
- 2001/02–2008/09: South Australia
- 2009/10–2016/17: ACT Meteors
- 2015/16–2017/18: Melbourne Renegades

Career statistics
Competition	Test	ODI	T20I	LA
Matches	1	17	2	137
Runs scored	8	103	44	3,672
Batting average	4.00	19.36	22.00	33.08
100s/50s	0/0	0/0	0/0	2/21
Top score	5	34*	39	145*
Balls bowled	84	372	12	4,125
Wickets	1	11	0	108
Bowling average	40.00	24.54	–	26.97
5 wickets in innings	0	0	–	1
10 wickets in match	0	0	–	0
Best bowling	1/17	4/16	–	5/22
Catches/stumpings	0/–	11/–	0/–	84/–
- Source: CricketArchive, 6 August 2025

Kris Lynsey Britt (born 13 April 1984) is an Australian former cricketer. She debuted for the Australian women's cricket team in 2002 in the second test against England in Sydney, becoming the 144th woman to play Test cricket for Australia. She played 17 One Day Internationals and two Twenty20 Internationals for the Australian women's team, and was the 96th woman to play One Day International cricket for Australia.

Britt began her domestic cricket career with the South Australian Scorpions in 2001, and was their player of the year in 2006/2006. She started playing with the ACT Meteors in 2009. and went on to captain the side in the Women's National Cricket League.
