= Bridget Patterson =

Australian cricketer

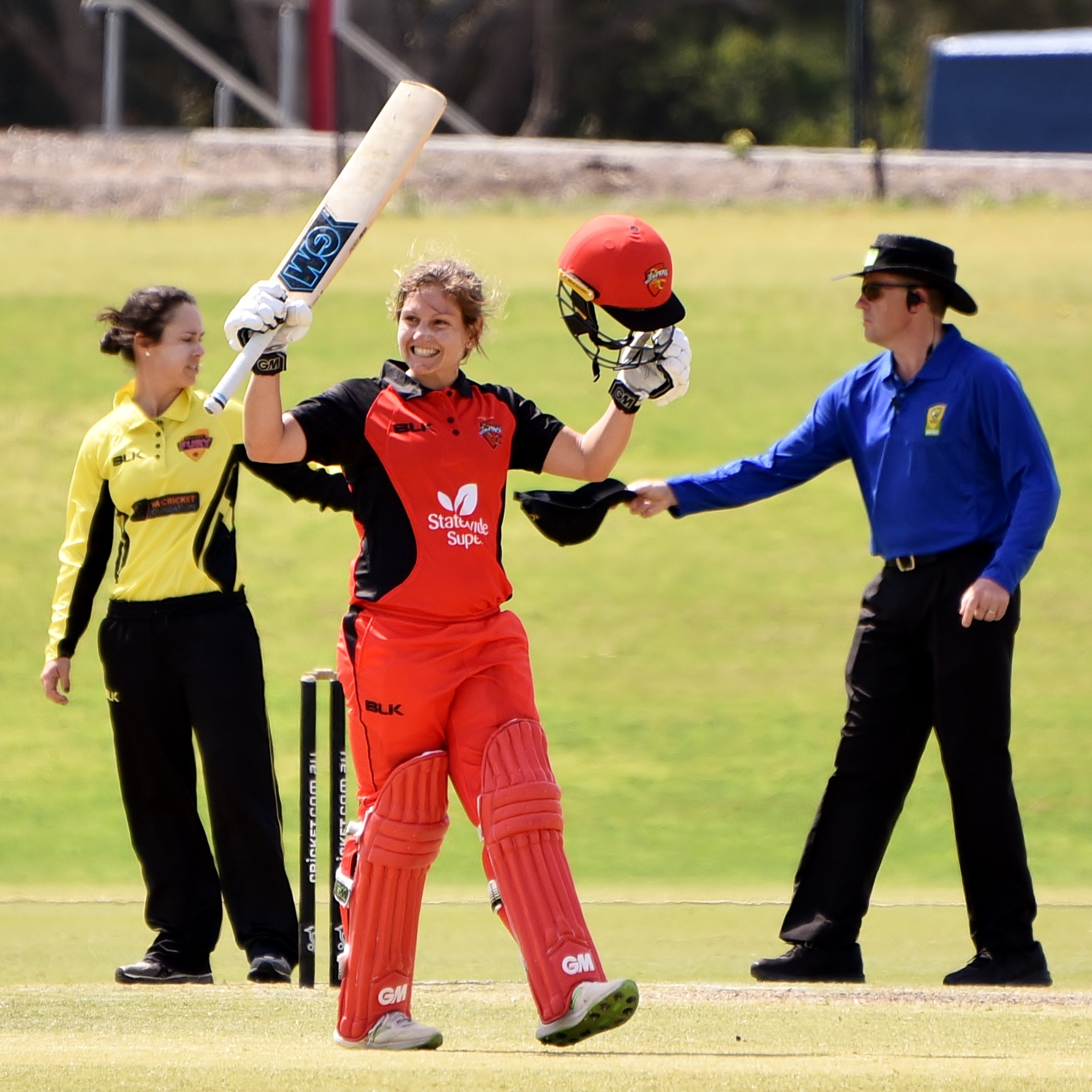
- Patterson celebrates her maiden century, 2018

Personal information
- Full name: Bridget Emma Patterson
- Born: 12 April 1994 (age 32); Kingscote, South Australia, Australia
- Batting: Right-handed
- Role: Wicket-keeper-batter

Domestic team information
- Years: Team
- 2012/13–present: South Australia (squad no. 21)
- 2015/16–present: Adelaide Strikers (squad no. 21)

Career statistics
Competition	WLA	WT20
Matches	99	172
Runs scored	2,800	2,395
Batting average	28.86	18.00
100s/50s	7/11	0/5
Top score	152	70
Catches/stumpings	42/0	75/12
- Source: CricketArchive, 20 October 2024

Bridget Emma Patterson (born 12 April 1994) is an Australian cricketer who plays as a right-handed batter for the South Australian Scorpions in the Women's National Cricket League (WNCL) and the Adelaide Strikers in the Women's Big Bash League (WBBL).

A daughter of lavender farmers at Emu Bay on Kangaroo Island, Patterson played childhood cricket against boys, and credits that experience for her rise in women's cricket.

In the final of the 2015–16 WNCL, Patterson scored 76 to anchor the Scorpions' innings of 7 for 264 against the New South Wales Breakers. The Scorpions won the match by 54 runs, thus ending New South Wales' 10-year grip on the WNCL trophy.

Patterson has been a member of the Adelaide Strikers squad since the inaugural WBBL season. Her run out of Molly Strano of the Melbourne Renegades during the Strikers' opening match of its WBBL02 campaign has been described as one of the highlights of that tournament.

In September 2018, Patterson achieved her maiden century for South Australia, scoring a player-of-the-match-winning 109 off 131 balls in the Scorpions' opening round 2018–19 WNCL victory over Western Australia.

Ahead of the WBBL|09 season, Patterson was named as the Strikers' wicket-keeper following the retirement of Tegan McPharlin.
