= Tegan McPharlin =

Australian cricketer (born 1988)

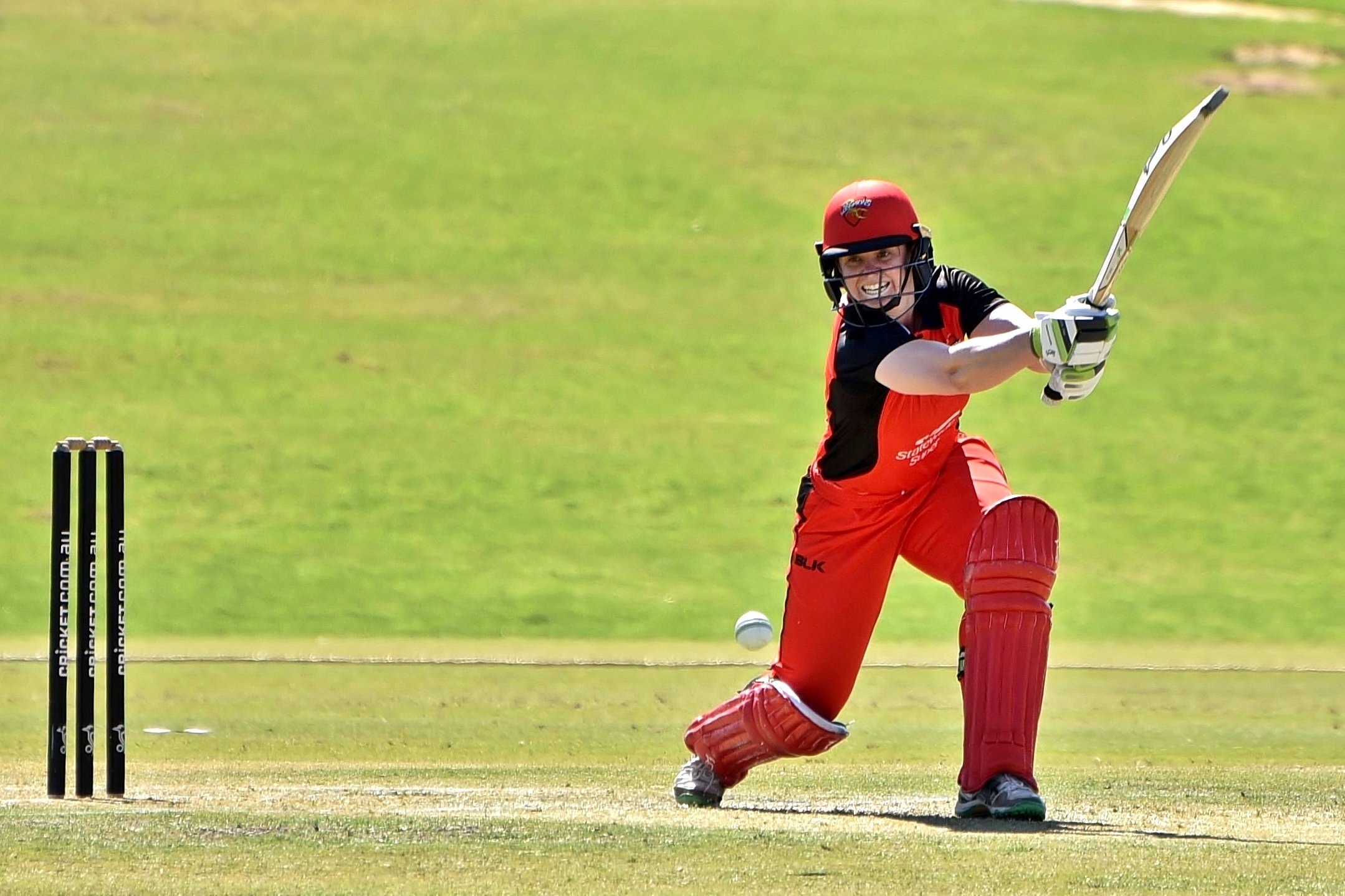
- McPharlin batting for South Australia, 2018

Personal information
- Full name: Tegan Jayne McPharlin
- Born: 7 August 1988 (age 38); Balaklava, South Australia
- Batting: Right-handed
- Bowling: Right-arm medium
- Role: Wicket-keeper

Domestic team information
- Years: Team
- 2007/08–2021/22: South Australian Scorpions (squad no. 7)
- 2015/16–2022/23: Adelaide Strikers (squad no. 7)

Career statistics
Competition	WLA	WT20
Matches	86	150
Runs scored	1,173	804
Batting average	15.43	12.96
100s/50s	0/5	0/0
Top score	69	12.96
Balls bowled	–	12
Wickets	–	1
Bowling average	–	16.00
5 wickets in innings	–	0
10 wickets in match	–	0
Best bowling	–	1/16
Catches/stumpings	59/25	62/50
- Source: CricketArchive, 21 October 2023

Tegan Jayne McPharlin (born 7 August 1988) is an Australian former cricketer who played as a right-handed batter and wicket-keeper. She played for South Australia and Adelaide Strikers. She announced her retirement from state cricket in 2022, and played one more season in the Women's Big Bash League.

McPharlin joined the South Australia squad in 2007. She was named in the Strikers' squad for its inaugural WBBL01 season (2015–16), and captained the side during the WBBL02 season (2016–17).

In November 2018, she was named in the Adelaide Strikers' squad for the 2018–19 Women's Big Bash League season.
