= Andrea McCauley =

Australian and State cricketer

Personal information
- Full name: Andrea McCauley
- Born: 23 September 1965 (age 61); Maitland, South Australia
- Batting: Right-handed
- Bowling: Right-arm medium
- Role: Bowler

International information
- National side: Australia (1990)
- Only Test (cap 116): 18 January 1990 v New Zealand
- Only ODI (cap 62): 6 February 1990 v New Zealand

Domestic team information
- Years: Team
- 1983/84–1995/96: South Australia

Career statistics
| Competition | WTest | WODI | WFC | WLA |
|---|---|---|---|---|
| Matches | 1 | 1 | 27 | 42 |
| Runs scored | 8 | 7 | 459 | 495 |
| Batting average | 8.00 | 7.00 | 18.36 | 15.96 |
| 100s/50s | 0/0 | 0/0 | 0/2 | 0/1 |
| Top score | 8 | 7 | 93 | 53 |
| Balls bowled | 96 | 42 | 2,025 | 1,230 |
| Wickets | 1 | 0 | 36 | 23 |
| Bowling average | 22.00 | – | 18.57 | 22.95 |
| 5 wickets in innings | 0 | 0 | 1 | 0 |
| 10 wickets in match | 0 | 0 | 0 | 0 |
| Best bowling | 1/22 | – | 6/27 | 3/15 |
| Catches/stumpings | 0/– | 0/– | 5/– | 16/– |
- Source: CricketArchive, 2 January 2023

Andrea McCauley (born 23 September 1965) is an Australian former cricketer and cricket coach. She appeared in one Test match and one One Day International for Australia in 1990, both against New Zealand. She played domestic cricket for South Australia, and was head coach of the side between 2014–15 and 2018–19.

== Cricket career ==
An outstanding all-rounder at State and Australian level from mid 1980s until 2000, McCauley captained South Australia in its most successful era to date where SA won three Women's National Cricket League titles during the mid-1990s. McCauley also represented Australia in Indoor Cricket and was named joint player of the Australian Indoor-Cricket Federation's National Master's Championship series in 1998. McCauley represented Olympics, Sturt and West Torrens during her extensive 20 year plus A grade career.

McCauley coached the SA Under 18 women's team, and was South Australian Scorpions assistant coach from 2007 until appointed Head Coach for 2013/14 season. McCauley was also head coach of West Torrens' women's teams. A major trophy named in McCauley's honor is awarded annually by the South Australian Cricket Association to the most outstanding South Australian women cricketer in the Women's National Cricket League.
