= Gemma Triscari =

Australian cricketer

Personal information
- Full name: Gemma Louise Triscari
- Born: 24 January 1990 (age 36); Subiaco, Western Australia
- Nickname: Trixie
- Height: 169 cm (5 ft 7 in)
- Batting: Right-handed
- Bowling: Left-arm fast-medium

Domestic team information
- Years: Team
- 2015–2017: Melbourne Stars Women (squad no. 8)
- Source: ESPNCricinfo, 26 October 2020

Gemma Louise Triscari (born 24 January 1990) is an Australian cricketer. A bowler, she is a current member of the Melbourne Stars Women and the Australian women's cricket team.

Triscari has been on the cusp and around the fringes of the Australian side since 2013 when she was selected in the Ashes squad, but is yet to represent the Southern Stars. She has, however, had numerous call-ups to the Shooting Stars (Australia’s top emerging women’s cricketers), showing she’s in the selectors’ minds.

Triscari made her state debut in 2007-08 as a 17-year-old and has since played 56 Twenty20 matches for the Western Fury, and over 100 matches across all formats.

At the conclusion of the 2011-12 season, Triscari won the highest honour for women’s cricket in WA, the Zoe Goss Medal. She took 15 T20 wickets that season at an economy rate of just six.

She took a hat-trick in 2015–16 Women's Big Bash League season against Sydney Thunder Women.

Away from cricket, Triscari is a high school teacher in Western Australia.

Her nickname is "Trixie".

== Awards ==
- Zoe Goss Medal - Western Australia Player of the year - 2011-12.
