= Adelaide Strikers (WBBL) =

Australian women's cricket team

- League: Women's Big Bash League

Personnel
- Captain: Tahlia McGrath
- Coach: Luke Williams

Team information
- City: Adelaide
- Colours: Blue
- Home ground: Karen Rolton Oval
- Secondary home ground: Adelaide Oval

History
- Twenty20 debut: 12 December 2015
- WBBL wins: 2 (WBBL08) ,(WBBL09)
- Official website: Adelaide Strikers

The Adelaide Strikers are an Australian women's Twenty20 cricket team based in Adelaide, South Australia. They compete in the Women's Big Bash League, and won their first championship in WBBL|08.

== History ==
=== Formation ===
One of eight founding WBBL teams, the Adelaide Strikers are aligned with the men's team of the same name. At the official WBBL launch on 10 July 2015, Megan Schutt was unveiled as the team's first-ever player signing. Andrea McCauley was appointed as the Strikers' inaugural coach, while Lauren Ebsary became the team's inaugural captain.

The Strikers played their first match on 12 December at Aurora Stadium against the Hobart Hurricanes, losing by two runs. Their first win came on 20 December at Allan Border Field against the Sydney Thunder, chasing down a target of 149 runs with six wickets in hand and six balls to spare.

=== Rivalries ===
==== Perth Scorchers ====
In the league's early years, the Strikers and the Perth Scorchers experienced several instances of senior members switching allegiances:

- Inaugural Strikers captain Lauren Ebsary joined the Scorchers after just one season.
- Former Scorchers captain Suzie Bates moved to the Strikers ahead of WBBL|03 and became the first player to lead two WBBL clubs.
- After scoring the most runs for Perth throughout WBBL|01, Charlotte Edwards transferred to Adelaide in her final year of cricket. The following season, Edwards assumed an assistant coaching role for the Strikers.
- Ahead of WBBL|06, former Adelaide all-rounder Shelley Nitschke was appointed to the position of head coach for the Scorchers.

Noteworthy matches between the two teams include:

- 13 January 2018, Traeger Park: In a match reduced to 16 overs per side due to a rain delay, the Scorchers could only muster a first innings score of 9/87. In the run chase, Suzie Bates played a lone hand of 49 not out to help the Strikers win by six wickets with one ball to spare.
- 9 November 2019, Karen Rolton Oval: An innings of 80 runs from 58 deliveries by Amy Jones helped Perth post a total of 3/173. Despite a slow start to the run chase, Adelaide finished strongly with Bridget Patterson scoring 60 off 32 balls. However, Heather Graham conceded just a single off the final ball to give the Scorchers a two-run win.
- 7 December 2019, Allan Border Field: In the WBBL|05 semi-finals, the Strikers comfortably reached the required total of 127 with eight wickets in hand and eleven balls remaining to eliminate the Scorchers from the tournament.

==== Brisbane Heat ====
Noteworthy matches between the Strikers and the Brisbane Heat include:

- 21 January 2017, The Gabba: Chasing a modest total of 6/127, the Strikers required three runs for victory with two balls remaining. Brisbane medium-pacer Deandra Dottin then bowled Tegan McPharlin before conceding two runs off the final delivery to force a tie. In the resulting super over, Dottin–who had earlier scored 51 runs with the bat–capped off a dominant all-round performance by taking two wickets and limiting Adelaide to just four runs. Beth Mooney scored the winning runs to secure the Heat's first finals appearance.
- 8 December 2019, Allan Border Field: In the WBBL|05 final, the Heat gained early ascendancy through quick bowler Georgia Prestwidge, who dismissed Player of the Tournament Sophie Devine for just five. A "superb" knock of 55 runs from 33 balls by Amanda-Jade Wellington helped the Strikers to recover to a competitive score of 7/161. The match swung heavily toward Brisbane's favour in the fifth over of the run chase when Sammy-Jo Johnson hit four sixes against the bowling of Devine, though Johnson would be out caught-and-bowled on the last ball of the over. When Devine returned to bowl the eleventh over of the innings, Heat batter Jess Jonassen was dropped by Wellington at extra cover. Jonassen then scored a boundary from each of the next three deliveries she faced, taking Brisbane's required scoring rate down to less than a run a ball. The Heat went on to win with six wickets in hand and eleven balls remaining, claiming their second consecutive championship. For her contribution of 56 not out, Beth Mooney was named Player of the Final.

== Captaincy records ==
There have been five captains in the Strikers' history, including matches featuring an acting captain.

Captain	Span	M	Won	Lost	Tied	NR	W–L%
Lauren Ebsary	2015–16	14	6	8	0	0	42.86
Tegan McPharlin	2016–17	14	3	9	0	2	25
Suzie Bates	2017–20	46	24	21	0	1	53.33
Megan Schutt	2020–22	15	8	6	0	1	57.14
Tahlia McGrath	2021–26	68	36	26	0	6	58.06

== Season summaries ==
Chart of yearly table positions for Adelaide Strikers in WBBL

Season	W–L	Pos.	Finals	Coach	Captain	Most Runs	Most Wickets	Most Valuable Player	Refs
2015–16	6–8	7th	DNQ	Andrea McCauley	Lauren Ebsary	Sarah Taylor – 393	Sarah Coyte – 14	Sarah Taylor	
2016–17	3–9	8th	DNQ	Andrea McCauley	Tegan McPharlin	Sophie Devine – 270	Megan Schutt – 13	Megan Schutt	
2017–18	8–6	4th	SF	Andrea McCauley	Suzie Bates	Suzie Bates – 434	Devine, Wellington – 17	Sophie Devine	
2018–19	5–8	6th	DNQ	Andrea McCauley	Suzie Bates	Sophie Devine – 556	Sophie Devine – 14	Sophie Devine	
2019	10–4	2nd	RU	Luke Williams	Suzie Bates	Sophie Devine – 769*	Coyte, Devine – 19	Sophie Devine*	
2020	6–7	6th	DNQ	Luke Williams	Suzie Bates (Note: Megan Schutt stood in as acting captain for 13 games)	Laura Wolvaardt – 347	Sarah Coyte – 18	Sarah Coyte	
2021	7–6	4th	RU	Luke Williams	Tahlia McGrath	Katie Mack – 513	Amanda-Jade Wellington – 23*	Katie Mack	
2022	8–5	2nd	C	Luke Williams	Tahlia McGrath (Note: Megan Schutt stood in as acting captain for 2 games)	Laura Wolvaardt – 403	Megan Schutt – 27*	Megan Schutt	
2023	11–3	1st	C	Luke Williams	Tahlia McGrath	Katie Mack – 452	Amanda-Jade Wellington – 23*	Megan Schutt	
2024	3–6	7th	DNQ	Luke Williams	Tahlia McGrath	Tahlia McGrath – 222	Megan Schutt – 13	Megan Schutt	
2025	3–4	6th	DNQ	Luke Williams	Tahlia McGrath	Laura Wolvaardt – 264	Darcie Brown – 11	Laura Wolvaardt	

Legend
DNQ	Did not qualify	SF	Semi-finalists	*	Led the league
EF	Lost the Eliminator	RU	Runners-up	^	League record
KF	Lost the Knockout	CF	Lost the Challenger	C	Champions

== Home grounds ==
Venue	Games hosted by season											
Venue	01	02	03	04	05	06	07	08	09	10	11	Total
Adelaide Oval	2	3	4	2	–	N/A (Note: All WBBL|06 matches were scheduled to be played in Sydney due to the COVID-19 pandemic)	4	–	2	2	1	20
Adelaide Oval No. 2	3	–	–	–	–	N/A	–	–	–	–	–	3
Albrecht Oval	–	–	–	2	–	N/A	–	–	–	–	–	2
Centennial Park Oval	–	–	–	–	1	N/A	–	1	–	–	–	2
Glenelg Oval	–	2	4	–	–	N/A	–	–	–	–	–	6
Karen Rolton Oval	–	–	–	3	4	N/A	4	5	4	2	3	25
Traeger Park	–	–	2	–	–	N/A	–	–	–	–	–	2

== Current squad ==
The squad of the Adelaide Strikers for the WBBL|12 as of 27 October 2026.

- Players with international caps are listed in **bold**.
- * denotes a player who is unavailable for rest of the season.

No.	Name	Nat.	Birth date	Batting style	Bowling style	Notes
Batters
22	**Maia Bouchier**	England	5 December 1998 (age 27)	Right-handed	Right-arm medium	International Signing
2	Emma de Broughe	Australia	6 September 2000 (age 26)	Right-handed	Right-arm medium	
14	**Laura Wolvaardt**	South Africa	26 April 1999 (age 27)	Right-handed	Right-arm medium	International Signing
All-rounders
35	Eleanor Larosa	Australia	26 November 2005 (age 20)	Left-handed	Left-arm medium	
9	**Tahlia McGrath**	Australia	10 November 1995 (age 30)	Right-handed	Right-arm medium	Captain
11	Maddie Penna	Australia	30 August 2000 (age 26)	Right-handed	Right-arm leg spin	
Wicket-keepers
77	Ellie Johnston	Australia	29 January 2003 (age 23)	Right-handed	—N/a	
21	Bridget Patterson	Australia	4 December 1994 (age 31)	Right-handed	—N/a	
Bowlers
20	**Darcie Brown**	Australia	7 March 2003 (age 23)	Right-handed	Right-arm fast	Ruled out through injury
7	Maggie Clark	Australia	15 March 2007 (age 19)	Left-handed	Right-arm fast-medium	
19	**Sophie Ecclestone**	England	6 May 1999 (age 27)	Right-handed	Left-arm orthodox	International Signing
61	**Anesu Mushangwe**	Zimbabwe Australia	25 February 1996 (age 30)	Right-handed	Right-arm leg spin	
27	**Megan Schutt**	Australia	15 January 1993 (age 33)	Right-handed	Right-arm fast	
10	**Amanda-Jade Wellington**	Australia	29 May 1997 (age 29)	Right-handed	Right-arm leg spin	
8	Ella Wilson	Australia	17 November 2003 (age 22)	Right-handed	Right-arm fast-medium	

== Players ==
=== Australian representatives ===
(Australia) The following is a list of cricketers who have played for the Strikers after making their debut in the national women's team (the period they spent as both a Strikers squad member and an Australian-capped player is in brackets):

- Sarah Coyte (WBBL|01–02, 04–07)
- Lauren Ebsary (WBBL|01)
- Shelley Nitschke (WBBL|01–02)
- Megan Schutt (WBBL|01–12)
- Sarah Elliott (WBBL|02)
- Tahlia McGrath (WBBL|02–12)
- Amanda-Jade Wellington (WBBL|02–12)
- Darcie Brown (WBBL|07–12)

=== Overseas marquees ===
- (New Zealand) Sophie Devine (WBBL|01–05)
- (Cricket West Indies) Stacy-Ann King (WBBL|01)
- (England) Sarah Taylor (WBBL|01)
- (England) Tammy Beaumont (WBBL|02–03, 11)
- (England) Charlotte Edwards (WBBL|02)
- (New Zealand) Suzie Bates (WBBL|03–06)
- (England) Danielle Hazell (WBBL|04)
- (Cricket West Indies) Stafanie Taylor (WBBL|05–06)
- (England) Lauren Winfield-Hill (WBBL|05)
- (South Africa) Laura Wolvaardt (WBBL|06–12)
- (New Zealand) Katie Perkins (WBBL|06)
- (South Africa) Dane van Niekerk (WBBL|07)
- (Cricket West Indies) Deandra Dottin (WBBL|08)
- (England) Georgia Adams (WBBL|09)
- (England) Danielle Gibson (WBBL|09)
- (Ireland) Orla Prendergast (WBBL|10)
- (India) Smriti Mandhana (WBBL|10)
- (England) Sophie Ecclestone (WBBL|11–12)
- (England) Maia Bouchier (WBBL|12)

=== Associate rookies ===
- (Netherlands) Miranda Veringmeier (WBBL|01)
- (Papua New Guinea) Ravina Oa (WBBL|02)
- (Scotland) Kathryn Bryce (WBBL|03)

== Honours ==
- Champions: 2 – WBBL|08, WBBL|09
- Runners-up: 2 – WBBL|05, WBBL|07
- Minor Premiers: 1 – WBBL|09
- Finals Appearances: 1 – WBBL|03, WBBL|05, WBBL|07, WBBL|08, WBBL|09
- Wooden Spoons: 1 – WBBL|02

== Statistics and awards ==
=== Team stats ===
- Win–loss record:

Opposition	M	Won	Lost	Tied	NR	W–L%
Brisbane Heat	27	12	15	0	0	44.44
Hobart Hurricanes	22	13	6	0	3	68.42
Melbourne Renegades	22	10	11	0	1	47.62
Melbourne Stars	21	10	9	0	2	52.63
Perth Scorchers	23	13	9	0	1	59.09
Sydney Sixers	22	9	13	0	0	40.91
Sydney Thunder	20	10	7	0	3	58.82
Total	157	77	70	0	10	52.38

- Highest score in an innings: 5/189 (20 overs) vs Hobart Hurricanes, 8 January 2019
- Highest successful chase: 4/169 (20 overs) vs Perth Scorchers, 5 November 2023
- Lowest successful defence: 7/107 (20 overs) vs Perth Scorchers, 14 January 2018
- Largest victory:
  - By runs: 148 runs vs Melbourne Stars, 21 October 2023
  - By wickets: 9 wickets vs Melbourne Renegades, 25 November 2021
  - By balls remaining: 58 balls remaining vs Sydney Sixers, 20 November 2021
- Longest winning streak: 6 matches
- Longest losing streak: 8 matches

=== Individual stats ===
- Most runs: Tahlia McGrath – 2,503
- Highest score in an innings: Sophie Devine – 103* (48) vs Hobart Hurricanes, 26 December 2016
- Highest partnership: Katie Mack and Laura Wolvaardt – 135 vs Melbourne Stars, 21 October 2023
- Most wickets: Amanda-Jade Wellington – 168
- Best bowling figures in an innings: Megan Schutt – 6/19 (3.3 overs) vs Sydney Thunder, 20 November 2022
- Hat-tricks taken: Darcie Brown vs Brisbane Heat, 24 October 2021
- Most catches (fielder): Bridget Patterson – 52
- Most dismissals (wicket-keeper): Tegan McPharlin – 91 (51 catches, 40 stumpings)

=== Individual awards ===
- Player of the Match:
  - Sophie Devine – 15
  - Tahlia McGrath – 11
  - Katie Mack and Laura Wolvaardt - 7
  - Amanda-Jade Wellington - 6
  - Darcie Brown and Bridget Patterson – 5
  - Sarah Coyte and Megan Schutt – 4
  - Suzie Bates and Madeline Penna – 3
  - Deandra Dottin, Lauren Ebsary, Tegan McPharlin, Anesu Mushangwe, Alex Price, Tabatha Saville, Sarah Taylor, and Stafanie Taylor – 1
- WBBL Player of the Final:
  - Deandra Dottin – WBBL|08
  - Amanda-Jade Wellington – WBBL|09
- WBBL Player of the Tournament:
  - Sophie Devine – WBBL|05
- WBBL Team of the Tournament:
  - Sophie Devine (4) – WBBL|02, WBBL|03, WBBL|04, WBBL|05
  - Darcie Brown (2) – WBBL|06, WBBL|07
  - Megan Schutt (2) – WBBL|05, WBBL|08
  - Amanda-Jade Wellington (2) – WBBL|07, WBBL|08, WBBL|09
  - Sarah Coyte – WBBL|06
  - Tahlia McGrath – WBBL|07
  - Katie Mack – WBBL|09
- WBBL Young Gun Award: Darcie Brown – WBBL|06

== Sponsors ==
Year	Kit Manufacturer	Chest Sponsor	Back Sponsor	Breast Sponsor	Sleeve Sponsor
2015–16	Majestic	Rebel	Websters Lawyers	Websters Lawyers	Websters Lawyers
2016–17	Majestic	Rebel	Statewide Super	Websters Lawyers	Rebel
2017–18	Majestic	Rebel	Statewide Super	Vodafone	Rebel
2018–19	Majestic	Vodafone	People's Choice	Statewide Super	Rebel
2019–20	Majestic	Vodafone	People's Choice	Statewide Super	Rebel
2020–21	Majestic	Vodafone	People's Choice	Statewide Super	Rebel
2021–22	Nike	Oval Hotel	Oval Hotel	People's Choice	
2022–23	Nike	Tool Kit Depot	Tool Kit Depot	People's Choice	
2023–24	Nike	Flinders University	Tool Kit Depot	People's Choice	
2024–25	Nike	Flinders University		People First Bank	

== See also ==
- South Australian Cricket Association
- South Australian Scorpions
