= 2022–23 Perth Scorchers WBBL season =

Women's Big Bash season

Perth Scorchers
2022–23 season
- Perth Scorchers 2022–23 cap logo
- Coach: Shelley Nitschke
- Captain(s): Sophie Devine
- Home ground: WACA Ground
- League: WBBL
- Record: 6–7 (5th)
- Finals: DNQ
- Leading Run Scorer: Beth Mooney – 434
- Leading Wicket Taker: Alana King – 17
- Player of the Season: Marizanne Kapp

The 2022–23 Perth Scorchers Women's season was the eighth in the team's history. Coached by Shelley Nitschke and captained by Sophie Devine, the Scorchers entered WBBL|08 as defending champions after claiming their maiden title in WBBL|07. They finished the regular season in fifth position and consequently failed to qualify for the finals.

== Squad ==
Each 2022–23 squad was made up of 15 active players. Teams could sign up to five 'marquee players', with a maximum of three of those from overseas. Marquees were defined as any overseas player, or a local player who holds a Cricket Australia national contract at the start of the WBBL|08 signing period.

Personnel changes made ahead of the season included:

- Heather Graham departed the Scorchers, signing with the Hobart Hurricanes.
- Holly Ferling signed with the Scorchers, having previously played for the Brisbane Heat, Melbourne Stars and Melbourne Renegades.
- Maddy Darke signed with the Scorchers, having previously played for the Sydney Sixers and Melbourne Stars.
- Sri Lankan marquee Chamari Athapaththu did not re-sign with the Scorchers.
- New Zealand marquee Maddy Green signed with the Scorchers, having previously played for the Brisbane Heat.

The table below lists the Scorchers players and their key stats (including runs scored, batting strike rate, wickets taken, economy rate, catches and stumpings) for the season.

No.	Name	Nat.	Birth Date	Batting style	Bowling style	G	R	SR	W	E	C	S	Notes
Batters
5	Mathilda Carmichael	(Australia)	4 April 1994	Right-handed	Right-arm medium	14	69	79.31	–	–	0	–	
9	Amy Edgar	(Australia)	27 December 1997	Right-handed	Right-arm medium	14	130	109.24	4	6.77	3	–	
25	Maddy Green	(New Zealand)	20 October 1992	Right-handed	Right-arm off spin	14	240	105.26	–	–	10	–	Overseas marquee
28	Chloe Piparo	(Australia)	5 September 1994	Right-handed	Right-arm off spin	14	174	95.08	–	–	5	–	
All-rounders
	Charis Bekker	(Australia)	14 March 2004	Right-handed	Left-arm orthodox	–	–	–	–	–	–	–	
77	Sophie Devine	(New Zealand)	1 September 1989	Right-handed	Right-arm medium fast	14	182	97.32	8	7.20	9	–	Captain, overseas marquee
7	Marizanne Kapp	(South Africa)	4 January 1990	Right-handed	Right-arm medium fast	14	229	143.12	12	5.74	–	–	Overseas marquee
Wicket-keeper
	Maddy Darke	(Australia)	30 March 2001	Right-handed	–	–	–	–	–	–	–	–	
10	Beth Mooney	(Australia)	14 January 1994	Left-handed	–	14	434	120.55	–	–	5	0	Australian marquee
Bowlers
8	Piepa Cleary	(Australia)	17 July 1996	Right-handed	Right-arm medium fast	14	53	120.45	11	8.03	5	–	
22	Holly Ferling	(Australia)	22 December 1995	Right-handed	Right-arm medium fast	5	8	200.00	1	7.75	1	–	
23	Alana King	(Australia)	22 November 1995	Left-handed	Right-arm leg spin	14	68	174.35	17	5.91	4	–	Australian marquee
56	Lilly Mills	(Australia)	2 January 2001	Right-handed	Right-arm off spin	14	3	50.00	15	6.81	5	–	
6	Taneale Peschel	(Australia)	29 August 1994	Right-handed	Right-arm medium fast	9	–	–	7	7.95	1	–	
	Georgia Wyllie	(Australia)	3 May 2002	Right-handed	Left-arm medium fast	–	–	–	–	–	–	–	

== Ladder ==
Pos	Team	Pld	W	L	NR	Pts	NRR
1	Sydney Sixers (RU)	14	11	2	1	23	0.695
2	Adelaide Strikers (C)	14	8	5	1	17	0.390
3	Brisbane Heat (CF)	14	8	5	1	17	0.276
4	Hobart Hurricanes (EF)	14	7	6	1	15	0.457
5	Perth Scorchers	14	6	7	1	13	0.373
6	Melbourne Stars	14	5	6	3	13	−0.339
7	Melbourne Renegades	14	4	9	1	9	−1.042
8	Sydney Thunder	14	1	10	3	5	−1.000

Source: cricket.com.au, ESPN Cricinfo
- The top 4 teams advanced to the play-off phase

== Fixtures ==
All times are AEDT.

Match 7
16 October 2022
17:00 (D/N)
Scorecard

Sydney Thunder; 8/88 (20 overs)	v	Perth Scorchers; 1/89 (14.5 overs)
Tahlia Wilson 28 (35); Lilly Mills 2/12 (4 overs)		Sophie Devine 44* (42); Chloe Tryon 1/8 (1 over)

Perth Scorchers won by 9 wickets (with 31 balls remaining)
Blacktown ISP Oval, Sydney
Umpires: Daniel Moran and Roberto Howard
Player of the match: Sophie Devine (Perth Scorchers)

- Sydney Thunder won the toss and elected to bat.
- Broadcast by cricket.com.au and Foxtel

Match 8
17 October 2022
19:05 (N)
Scorecard

Hobart Hurricanes; 9/109 (20 overs)	v	Perth Scorchers; 2/110 (14.1 overs)
Heather Graham 35 (28); Taneale Peschel 3/13 (4 overs)		Beth Mooney 38* (36); Ruth Johnston 1/13 (2 overs)

Perth Scorchers won by 8 wickets (with 35 balls remaining)
Blacktown ISP Oval, Sydney
Umpires: Andrew Hamilton and Roberto Howard
Player of the match: Maddy Green (Perth Scorchers)

- Perth Scorchers won the toss and elected to field.
- Broadcast by cricket.com.au and Foxtel

Match 11
20 October 2022
20:10 (D/N)
Scorecard

Melbourne Stars; 9/110 (20 overs)	v	Perth Scorchers; 8/111 (19.4 overs)
Tess Flintoff 40* (29); Piepa Cleary 2/8 (2 overs)		Beth Mooney 35 (44); Annabel Sutherland 2/20 (3 overs)

Perth Scorchers won by 2 wickets (with 2 balls remaining)
WACA Ground, Perth
Umpires: Stephen Dionysius and Trent Steenholdt
Player of the match: Beth Mooney (Perth Scorchers)

- Perth Scorchers won the toss and elected to field.
- Broadcast by Seven Network and Foxtel

Match 14
22 October 2022
14:30
Scorecard

Sydney Thunder; 4/166 (20 overs)	v	Perth Scorchers; 9/141 (20 overs)
Tammy Beaumont 77* (59); Alana King 1/22 (2 overs)		Marizanne Kapp 32 (23); Lauren Smith 5/17 (4 overs)

Sydney Thunder won by 25 runs
WACA Ground, Perth
Umpires: Ashlee Gibbons and Jarryd Buscall
Player of the match: Lauren Smith (Sydney Thunder)

- Perth Scorchers won the toss and elected to field.
- Broadcast by cricket.com.au and Foxtel

Match 16
23 October 2022
17:15
Scorecard

Perth Scorchers	v	Hobart Hurricanes

No result (abandoned with a toss)
WACA Ground, Perth
Umpires: Ashlee Gibbons and Sue Redfern

- Hobart Hurricanes won the toss and elected to field.
- Broadcast by Seven Network and Foxtel
- No play was possible due to rain.

Match 20
28 October 2022
15:15
Scorecard

Perth Scorchers; 5/111 (20 overs)	v	Adelaide Strikers; 4/112 (18.3 overs)
Beth Mooney 34 (34); Amanda-Jade Wellington 2/13 (4 overs)		Katie Mack 47* (51); Lilly Mills 3/17 (3 overs)

Adelaide Strikers won by 6 wickets (with 9 balls remaining)
Allan Border Field, Brisbane
Umpires: Benjamin Farrell and Tom Logan
Player of the match: Katie Mack (Adelaide Strikers)

- Perth Scorchers won the toss and elected to bat.
- Broadcast by cricket.com.au and Foxtel

Match 23
29 October 2022
19:10 (N)
Scorecard

Perth Scorchers; 7/140 (20 overs)	v	Brisbane Heat; 7/137 (20 overs)
Amy Edgar 36* (26); Jess Jonassen 3/22 (4 overs)		Danni Wyatt 34 (29); Lilly Mills 2/19 (2 overs)

Perth Scorchers won by 3 runs
Allan Border Field, Brisbane
Umpires: Eloise Sheridan and Nathan Jones
Player of the match: Amy Edgar (Perth Scorchers)

- Perth Scorchers won the toss and elected to bat.
- Broadcast by Seven Network and Foxtel

Match 31
5 November 2022
16:25
Scorecard

Sydney Sixers; 5/155 (20 overs)	v	Perth Scorchers; 1/158 (18.3 overs)
Ellyse Perry 69* (58); Alana King 3/27 (4 overs)		Beth Mooney 99* (58); Ashleigh Gardner 1/19 (4 overs)

Perth Scorchers won by 9 wickets (with 9 balls remaining)
Lilac Hill Park, Perth
Umpires: Jamie Thomas and Trent Steenholdt
Player of the match: Beth Mooney (Perth Scorchers)

- Sydney Sixers won the toss and elected to bat.
- Broadcast by cricket.com.au and Foxtel

Match 34
6 November 2022
16:50
Scorecard

Perth Scorchers; 9/119 (20 overs)	v	Adelaide Strikers; 3/120 (16 overs)
Sophie Devine 37 (33); Megan Schutt 4/20 (4 overs)		Deandra Dottin 68 (51); Piepa Cleary 2/29 (3 overs)

Adelaide Strikers won by 7 wickets (with 24 balls remaining)
Lilac Hill Park, Perth
Umpires: Jarryd Buscall and Trent Steenholdt
Player of the match: Megan Schutt (Adelaide Strikers)

- Perth Scorchers won the toss and elected to bat.
- Broadcast by cricket.com.au and Foxtel

Match 36
9 November 2022
15:00
Scorecard

Brisbane Heat; 7/153 (20 overs)	v	Perth Scorchers; 8/120 (20 overs)
Georgia Redmayne 28* (27); Alana King 2/24 (4 overs)		Maddy Green 58 (53); Nicola Hancock 3/26 (4 overs)

Brisbane Heat won by 33 runs
Lilac Hill Park, Perth
Umpires: Ashlee Gibbons and Jamie Thomas
Player of the match: Amelia Kerr (Brisbane Heat)

- Perth Scorchers won the toss and elected to field.
- Broadcast by cricket.com.au and Foxtel

Match 39
12 November 2022
10:15
Scorecard

Perth Scorchers; 4/192 (20 overs)	v	Melbourne Renegades; 88 (17.3 overs)
Beth Mooney 90 (58); Georgia Prestwidge 1/37 (4 overs)		Erica Kershaw 25 (22); Piepa Cleary 2/6 (2 overs)

Perth Scorchers won by 104 runs
CitiPower Centre, Melbourne
Umpires: Mattis van Eck and Stephen Dionysius
Player of the match: Beth Mooney (Perth Scorchers)

- Melbourne Renegades won the toss and elected to field.
- Broadcast by Seven Network and Foxtel
- Perth Scorchers set a new WBBL record for greatest winning margin (by runs).

Match 42
13 November 2022
10:15
Scorecard

Perth Scorchers; 4/176 (20 overs)	v	Sydney Sixers; 4/180 (20 overs)
Beth Mooney 75* (51); Ashleigh Gardner 2/30 (4 overs)		Alyssa Healy 107* (64); Sophie Devine 2/29 (4 overs)

Sydney Sixers won by 6 wickets (with 0 balls remaining)
CitiPower Centre, Melbourne
Umpires: Daryl Brigham and David Taylor
Player of the match: Alyssa Healy (Sydney Sixers)

- Sydney Sixers won the toss and elected to field.
- Broadcast by Seven Network and Foxtel

Match 52
19 November 2022
10:40
Scorecard

Melbourne Stars; 8/179 (20 overs)	v	Perth Scorchers; 7/173 (20 overs)
Lauren Winfield-Hill 36 (25); Amy Edgar 3/27 (4 overs)		Chloe Piparo 34 (27); Alice Capsey 3/37 (4 overs)

Melbourne Stars won by 6 runs
Ted Summerton Reserve, Moe
Umpires: Lisa McCabe and Mattis van Eck
Player of the match: Sasha Moloney (Melbourne Stars)

- Perth Scorchers won the toss and elected to field.
- Broadcast by cricket.com.au and Foxtel

Match 53
20 November 2022
10:15
Scorecard

Perth Scorchers; 2/46 (8 overs)	v	Melbourne Renegades; 4/58 (7.3 overs)
Sophie Devine 24* (22); Shabnim Ismail 1/12 (2 overs)		Erica Kershaw 34* (18); Lilly Mills 3/9 (2 overs)

Melbourne Renegades won by 6 wickets (with 3 balls remaining) (DLS method)
Ted Summerton Reserve, Moe
Umpires: Daryl Brigham and Lisa McCabe
Player of the match: Erica Kershaw (Melbourne Renegades)

- Melbourne Renegades won the toss and elected to field.
- Match reduced to 8 overs per side due to rain. Melbourne Renegades were set a revised target of 57 for victory.
- Broadcast by cricket.com.au and Foxtel

== Statistics and awards ==
- Most runs: Beth Mooney – 434 (1st in the league)
- Highest score in an innings: Beth Mooney – 99* (58) vs Sydney Sixers, 5 November 2022
- Most wickets: Alana King – 17 (12th in the league)
- Best bowling figures in an innings: Lilly Mills – 3/9 (2 overs) vs Melbourne Renegades, 20 November 2022
- Most catches (fielder): Maddy Green – 10 (6th in the league)
- Player of the Match awards:
  - Beth Mooney – 3
  - Sophie Devine, Amy Edgar, Maddy Green – 1 each
- WBBL|08 Player of the Tournament: Beth Mooney (equal 3rd)
- WBBL|08 Team of the Tournament: Beth Mooney
- Scorchers Player of the Year: Marizanne Kapp
