= 2024–25 Perth Scorchers WBBL season =

Women's Big Bash season

Perth Scorchers
2024–25 season
- Perth Scorchers 2022–23 cap logo
- Coach: Shelley Nitschke
- Captain(s): Sophie Devine
- Home ground: WACA Ground
- League: WBBL

The 2024–25 Perth Scorchers Women's season 10th season of the Women's Big Bash League. Coached by Shelley Nitschke and captained by Sophie Devine. They finished second in the previous season after losing the Challenger to Brisbane Heat.

== Squads ==
No.	Name	Nat.	Birth Date	Batting style	Bowling style	Notes
Batters
5	Mathilda Carmichael	(Australia)	4 April 1994	Right-handed	Right-arm medium	
9	Amy Edgar	(Australia)	27 December 1997	Right-handed	Right-arm medium	
25	Maddy Green	(New Zealand)	20 October 1992	Right-handed	Right-arm off spin	Overseas marquee
28	Chloe Piparo	(Australia)	5 September 1994	Right-handed	Right-arm off spin	
All-rounders
	Charis Bekker	(Australia)	14 March 2004	Right-handed	Left-arm orthodox	
77	Sophie Devine	(New Zealand)	1 September 1989	Right-handed	Right-arm medium fast	Captain, overseas marquee
7	Marizanne Kapp	(South Africa)	4 January 1990	Right-handed	Right-arm medium fast	Overseas marquee
Wicket-keeper
	Maddy Darke	(Australia)	30 March 2001	Right-handed	–	
10	Beth Mooney	(Australia)	14 January 1994	Left-handed	–	Australian marquee
Bowlers
8	Piepa Cleary	(Australia)	17 July 1996	Right-handed	Right-arm medium fast	
22	Holly Ferling	(Australia)	22 December 1995	Right-handed	Right-arm medium fast	
23	Alana King	(Australia)	22 November 1995	Left-handed	Right-arm leg spin	Australian marquee
56	Lilly Mills	(Australia)	2 January 2001	Right-handed	Right-arm off spin	
6	Taneale Peschel	(Australia)	29 August 1994	Right-handed	Right-arm medium fast	
	Georgia Wyllie	(Australia)	3 May 2002	Right-handed	Left-arm medium fast	

== Standing ==
Pos	Team	Pld	W	L	T	NR	Pts	NRR	
1	Melbourne Renegades (C)	10	7	3	0	0	14	0.527	Advance to the play-off phase
2	Brisbane Heat (R)	10	7	3	0	0	14	0.384	Advance to the play-off phase
3	Sydney Thunder (3rd)	10	6	3	0	1	13	−0.002	Advance to the play-off phase
4	Hobart Hurricanes (4th)	10	5	5	0	0	10	0.189	Advance to the play-off phase
5	Perth Scorchers	10	4	5	1	0	9	−0.171	
6	Sydney Sixers	10	3	5	1	1	8	−0.477	
7	Adelaide Strikers	10	3	6	0	1	7	−0.357	
8	Melbourne Stars	10	2	7	0	1	5	−0.205	

Source: ESPNcricinfo
(C) Champions; (R) Runners-up
