= 2020–21 Melbourne Renegades WBBL season =

Melbourne Renegades
2020–21 season
- Melbourne Renegades 2020–21 cap logo
- Coach: Lachlan Stevens
- Captain(s): Amy Satterthwaite
- League: WBBL
- Record: 4–8 (7th)
- Finals: DNQ
- Leading Run Scorer: Lizelle Lee – 261
- Leading Wicket Taker: Leeson, Molineux – 11
- Player of the Season: Courtney Webb

The 2020–21 Melbourne Renegades Women's season was the sixth in the team's history. Coached by Lachlan Stevens and captained by Amy Satterthwaite, the Renegades played the entirety of WBBL|06 in a bio-secure Sydney hub due to the COVID-19 pandemic. Suffering from a slew of fitness concerns throughout the tournament, it was the team's first campaign in which their performance on the points table did not improve from the previous year. The Renegades consequently finished the regular season in seventh place and failed to qualify for the finals.

== Squad ==
Each 2020–21 squad was made up of 15 active players. Teams could sign up to five 'marquee players', with a maximum of three of those from overseas. Marquees are classed as any overseas player, or a local player who holds a Cricket Australia national contract at the start of the WBBL|06 signing period.

Personnel changes made ahead of the season included:

- Erin Fazackerley signed with the Renegades, departing the Hobart Hurricanes.
- South African marquee player Lizelle Lee signed with the Renegades, departing the Melbourne Stars.
- New Zealand marquee player Amy Satterthwaite returned to the Renegades after a season's absence, having missed WBBL|05 while pregnant with her first child. Satterthwaite also resumed her role as captain, after Jess Duffin stepped into the position for a season.
- As part of Cricket Victoria's cost-cutting organisational restructure, the Renegades did not renew the contract of head coach Tim Coyle despite achieving two consecutive finals appearances. Lachlan Stevens, who coached the Renegades in their first two seasons, was announced as Coyle's replacement.
- On 25 September, the Renegades confirmed Jess Duffin would miss the WBBL|06 season following the birth of her first child in June. Explaining the decision, Duffin said: "The WBBL is such a high-quality competition with a lot of games in quick succession and unfortunately my body is just not ready for that at this point."

Changes made during the season included:

- New Zealand marquee Rosemary Mair was signed from the reserve player pool. She played five games for the Renegades from 3–14 November, replacing Lea Tahuhu (side strain).
- On 6 November, the Renegades announced Maitlan Brown would miss the remaining nine games of the season due to a hamstring injury.
- On 10 November, the Renegades announced Georgia Wareham would miss the remaining seven games of the season due to a "bone stress reaction" in her shin.
- Amy Yates was signed from the reserve player pool, replacing Georgia Wareham for six matches from 14 to 22 November.
- Rebecca Carter was signed from the reserve player pool, replacing Maitlan Brown for one game on 22 November.

The table below lists the Renegades players and their key stats (including runs scored, batting strike rate, wickets taken, economy rate, catches and stumpings) for the season.

No.	Name	Nat.	Date of birth	Batting style	Bowling style	G	R	SR	W	E	C	S	Notes
Batters
16	Rebecca Carter	(Australia)	16 July 1996	Left-handed	Right-arm medium	1	2	25.00	–	–	0	–	Replacement player
27	Jess Duffin	(Australia)	27 June 1989	Right-handed	Right-arm leg spin	–	–	–	–	–	–	–	Unavailable for the season
33	Erin Fazackerley	(Australia)	3 July 1998	Right-handed	Right-arm medium	6	5	27.77	–	–	1	–	
17	Amy Satterthwaite	(New Zealand)	7 October 1986	Left-handed	Right-arm off spin	13	204	78.16	1	11.00	5	–	Captain, overseas marquee
11	Courtney Webb	(Australia)	30 November 1999	Right-handed	Right-arm medium	13	246	112.32	1	8.33	2	–	
All-rounders
25	Makinley Blows	(Australia)	12 December 1997	Left-handed	Right-arm medium	10	12	63.15	4	8.00	0	–	
23	Sophie Molineux	(Australia)	17 January 1998	Left-handed	Left-arm orthodox	12	221	93.24	11	7.00	3	–	Australian marquee
32	Georgia Wareham	(Australia)	26 May 1999	Right-handed	Right-arm leg spin	6	139	146.31	3	7.60	2	–	Australian marquee
88	Amy Yates	(Australia)	30 September 1998	Right-handed	Right-arm medium	6	21	95.45	–	–	0	–	Replacement player
Wicket-keepers
3	Josie Dooley	(Australia)	21 January 2000	Right-handed	–	12	138	95.83	–	–	4	5	
67	Lizelle Lee	(South Africa)	2 April 1992	Right-handed	Right-arm medium	13	261	121.96	–	–	0	0	Overseas marquee
Bowlers
77	Maitlan Brown	(Australia)	5 June 1997	Right-handed	Right-arm medium fast	4	8	57.14	0	4.90	1	–	
12	Ella Hayward	(Australia)	8 September 2003	Right-handed	Right-arm off spin	8	12	70.58	5	7.29	0	–	
74	Carly Leeson	(Australia)	9 November 1998	Right-handed	Right-arm medium	13	78	114.70	11	7.00	5	–	
7	Rosemary Mair	(New Zealand)	7 November 1998	Right-handed	Right-arm medium fast	5	5	33.33	5	6.50	0	–	Overseas marquee (replacement)
8	Courtney Neale	(Australia)	4 July 1998	Right-handed	Right-arm medium fast	3	–	–	1	10.66	0	–	
5	Molly Strano	(Australia)	5 October 1992	Right-handed	Right-arm off spin	13	24	77.41	8	7.30	6	–	
6	Lea Tahuhu	(New Zealand)	23 September 1990	Right-handed	Right-arm fast	5	9	100.00	4	6.82	1	–	Overseas marquee

== Ladder ==
Pos	Team	Pld	W	L	NR	Pts	NRR
1	Melbourne Stars (RU)	14	8	3	3	19	0.965
2	Brisbane Heat	14	8	4	2	18	0.543
3	Sydney Thunder (C)	14	7	5	2	16	0.344
4	Perth Scorchers	14	6	6	2	14	0.355
5	Sydney Sixers	14	6	6	2	14	−0.084
6	Adelaide Strikers	14	6	7	1	13	0.135
7	Melbourne Renegades	14	4	8	2	10	−1.008
8	Hobart Hurricanes	14	3	9	2	8	−1.143

- The top 4 teams advance to the play-off phase

== Fixtures ==
All times are local time

Match 4
25 October 2020
14:30
Scorecard

Melbourne Stars; 4/127 (17 overs)	v	Melbourne Renegades
Meg Lanning 51* (50); Carly Leeson 2/28 (3 overs)

No result
Hurstville Oval
Umpires: Roberto Howard and Jerry Matibiri

- Melbourne Renegades won the toss and elected to field
- No further play was possible due to rain
- Broadcast by Cricket Network

Match 6
26 October 2020
09:30
Scorecard

Brisbane Heat	v	Melbourne Renegades

Match abandoned
Hurstville Oval
Umpires: David Taylor and Tony Wilds

- No toss
- No play was possible due to rain
- Broadcast by Cricket Network

Match 10
31 October 2020
14:30
Scorecard

Melbourne Renegades; 5/105 (20 overs)	v	Perth Scorchers; 0/62 (9.5 overs)
Courtney Webb 33 (44); Nicole Bolton 2/13 (4 overs)		Sophie Devine 31* (28)

Perth Scorchers won by 18 runs (DLS method)
Drummoyne Oval
Umpires: Bede Sajowitz and Stephen Dionysius
Player of the match: Sophie Devine (Perth Scorchers)

- Perth Scorchers won the toss and elected to field
- No further play was possible due to rain
- Broadcast by Cricket Network

Match 15
1 November 2020
13:45
Scorecard

Melbourne Renegades; 7/119 (18 overs)	v	Sydney Sixers; 2/121 (13.1 overs)
Georgia Wareham 54* (27); Stella Campbell 3/32 (4 overs)		Alyssa Healy 60 (31); Georgia Wareham 2/35 (3 overs)

Sydney Sixers won by 8 wickets (with 29 balls remaining) (DLS method)
Sydney Showground Stadium
Umpires: Greg Davidson and Bede Sajowitz
Player of the match: Alyssa Healy (Sydney Sixers)

- Sydney Sixers won the toss and elected to field
- Match reduced to 18 overs per side due to rain delay
- Broadcast by Seven Network and Fox Cricket

Match 17
3 November 2020
14:30
Scorecard

Melbourne Renegades; 81 (19.5 overs)	v	Hobart Hurricanes; 1/82 (12.3 overs)
Amy Satterthwaite 20 (28); Nicola Carey 3/14 (3.5 overs)		Naomi Stalenberg 35* (38); Amy Satterthwaite 1/11 (1 over)

Hobart Hurricanes won by 9 wickets (with 45 balls remaining)
Blacktown International Sportspark
Umpires: Roberto Howard and Jeremiah Matibiri
Player of the match: Nicola Carey (Hobart Hurricanes)

- Hobart Hurricanes won the toss and elected to field
- Broadcast by Fox Cricket and Cricket Network

Match 22
7 November 2020
14:30
Scorecard

Melbourne Renegades; 110 (20 overs)	v	Sydney Thunder; 7/108 (20 overs)
Sophie Molineux 34 (42); Sammy-Jo Johnson 4/26 (4 overs)		Rachel Trenaman 26 (28); Sophie Molineux 2/19 (4 overs)

Melbourne Renegades won by 2 runs
Hurstville Oval
Umpires: Roberto Howard and Bede Sajowitz
Player of the match: Sammy-Jo Johnson (Sydney Thunder)

- Sydney Thunder won the toss and elected to field
- Broadcast by Cricket Network

Match 26
8 November 2020
10:20
Scorecard

Adelaide Strikers; 9/127 (20 overs)	v	Melbourne Renegades; 8/121 (20 overs)
Stafanie Taylor 60 (48); Sophie Molineux 3/20 (4 overs)		Georgia Wareham 42 (32); Sarah Coyte 2/21 (4 overs)

Adelaide Strikers won by 6 runs
North Sydney Oval
Umpires: Nathan Johnstone and David Taylor
Player of the match: Stafanie Taylor (Adelaide Strikers)

- Adelaide Strikers won the toss and elected to bat
- Broadcast by Seven Network and Fox Cricket

Match 30
10 November 2020
19:05 (D/N)
Scorecard

Hobart Hurricanes; 7/143 (20 overs)	v	Melbourne Renegades; 5/134 (20 overs)
Rachel Priest 42 (37); Sophie Molineux 2/18 (4 overs)		Lizelle Lee 38 (31); Hayley Matthews 2/19 (4 overs)

Hobart Hurricanes won by 9 runs
Blacktown International Sportspark
Umpires: Steven Farrell and Sharad Patel
Player of the match: Hayley Matthews (Hobart Hurricanes)

- Melbourne Renegades won the toss and elected to field
- Broadcast by Fox Cricket and Cricket Network

Match 33
14 November 2020
12:15
Scorecard

Melbourne Renegades; 3/122 (20 overs)	v	Perth Scorchers; 1/123 (14.5 overs)
Amy Satterthwaite 48* (56); Taneale Peschel 2/17 (4 overs)		Sophie Devine 77* (54); Sophie Molineux 1/25 (2.5 overs)

Perth Scorchers won by 9 wickets (with 31 balls remaining)
Sydney Showground Stadium
Umpires: Steven Farrell and Ben Treloar
Player of the match: Sophie Devine (Perth Scorchers)

- Perth Scorchers won the toss and elected to field
- Broadcast by Seven Network and Fox Cricket
- Sophie Devine became the first player to hit 100 career sixes in the WBBL

Match 40
15 November 2020
13:45
Scorecard

Melbourne Stars; 8/165 (20 overs)	v	Melbourne Renegades; 7/165 (20 overs)
Meg Lanning 41 (29); Ella Hayward 4/16 (4 overs)		Courtney Webb 54* (33); Holly Ferling 2/21 (3 overs)

Match tied
Melbourne Renegades won the Super Over
Sydney Showground Stadium
Umpires: Greg Davidson and Sharad Patel
Player of the match: Courtney Webb (Melbourne Renegades)

- Melbourne Renegades won the toss and elected to field
- Broadcast by Seven Network and Fox Cricket
- Venue changed from Drummoyne Oval
- Super Over: Melbourne Renegades 0/16 (1 over), Melbourne Stars 0/12 (1 over)
- Molly Strano became the first player to take 100 career wickets in the WBBL

Match 44
17 November 2020
19:05 (D/N)
Scorecard

Melbourne Renegades; 7/126 (20 overs)	v	Sydney Thunder; 2/132 (14.3 overs)
Josephine Dooley 46 (44); Hannah Darlington 3/22 (4 overs)		Heather Knight 58* (32); Carly Leeson 1/20 (2 overs)

Sydney Thunder won by 8 wickets (with 33 balls remaining)
Sydney Showground Stadium
Umpires: David Taylor and Eloise Sheridan
Player of the match: Heather Knight (Sydney Thunder)

- Sydney Thunder won the toss and elected to field
- Broadcast by Fox Cricket and Cricket Network
- Venue changed from Blacktown International Sportspark

Match 47
18 November 2020
14:30
Scorecard

Adelaide Strikers; 6/122 (20 overs)	v	Melbourne Renegades; 3/123 (17.3 overs)
Laura Wolvaardt 36 (40); Carly Leeson 3/14 (4 overs)		Sophie Molineux 52 (43); Amanda-Jade Wellington 1/19 (2 overs)

Melbourne Renegades won by 7 wickets (with 15 balls remaining)
Sydney Showground Stadium
Umpires: Greg Davidson and Eloise Sheridan
Player of the match: Carly Leeson (Melbourne Renegades)

- Adelaide Strikers won the toss and elected to bat
- Broadcast by Fox Cricket and Cricket Network
- Venue changed from Blacktown International Sportspark

Match 52
21 November 2020
19:05 (D/N)
Scorecard

Sydney Sixers; 4/166 (20 overs)	v	Melbourne Renegades; 4/169 (19.1 overs)
Alyssa Healy 63 (38); Molly Strano 2/35 (4 overs)		Lizelle Lee 79 (45); Sarah Aley 2/31 (4 overs)

Melbourne Renegades won by 6 wickets (with 5 balls remaining)
North Sydney Oval
Umpires: Troy Penman and David Taylor
Player of the match: Lizelle Lee (Melbourne Renegades)

- Melbourne Renegades won the toss and elected to field
- Broadcast by Seven Network and Fox Cricket
- Brisbane Heat qualified for finals

In front of a sold out reduced-capacity home crowd, the Sydney Sixers put on a 104-run opening partnership which came to an end during the 13th over when Alyssa Healy was stumped by Josie Dooley off the bowling of Molly Strano for 63. Two balls later, Ellyse Perry was dismissed for 37 by a spectacular diving catch from Courtney Webb, lauded as a contender for the best of the season. Marizanne Kapp (22 not out from 17 balls) and Erin Burns (19 off 11) helped the Sixers finish their innings with a total of 4/166.

On the first ball of the run chase, Lizelle Lee was dropped at backward point off the bowling of Perry. At just 3/70 in the 11th over, Webb joined Lee in the middle for the Melbourne Renegades to form a rapid 73-run stand from 33 deliveries. Sixers veteran Sarah Aley eventually broke through in the 16th over, removing Lee for 79 via a Burns catch in the outfield. Requiring 24 runs from the remaining 26 balls, Webb (46 not out off 28) saw the Renegades across the line with six wickets in hand inside the last over, mirroring her finishing heroics of a similarly tight encounter between the two teams in WBBL|05. The loss dramatically decreased the Sixers' chances of qualifying for finals heading into the final day of the regular season.

The match was also shrouded in controversy, and the outcome potentially affected, due to an "administration error" self-reported by the Sixers before the commencement of the second innings. Hayley Silver-Holmes, who had missed several previous games due to injury, was named in the team line-up despite not having yet been granted approval by the W/BBL Technical Committee to be added back into the official squad. Upon discovering the mistake, the Sixers ensured Silver-Holmes took no active part in the game and Maddy Darke replaced her as a substitute fielder, leaving them a bowler short in what was essentially a must-win game. Cricket Australia (CA) fined the Sixers $25,000 ($15,000 suspended for twelve months) with CA's Head of Integrity and Security stating that the breach, "while serious in nature," had a "reduced impact due to the Club's actions" during the game.

Match 56
22 November 2020
13:45
Scorecard

Brisbane Heat; 6/114 (17 overs)	v	Melbourne Renegades; 76 (16.2 overs)
Amelia Kerr 35* (26); Lea Tahuhu 2/16 (4 overs)		Amy Satterthwaite 14 (13); Georgia Prestwidge 4/12 (3.2 overs)

Brisbane Heat won by 43 runs (DLS method)
Drummoyne Oval
Umpires: David Taylor and Andrew Crozier
Player of the match: Georgia Prestwidge (Brisbane Heat)

- Melbourne Renegades won the toss and elected to field
- Match reduced to 17 overs per side due to rain delay
- Melbourne Renegades were set a revised target of 120 from 17 overs due to rain delay
- Broadcast by Cricket Network
- Match originally scheduled to begin at 14:30, start time brought forward by 45 minutes

== Statistics and awards ==
- Most runs: Lizelle Lee – 261 (13th in the league)
- Highest score in an innings: Lizelle Lee – 79 (45) vs Sydney Sixers, 21 November
- Most wickets: Carly Leeson, Sophie Molineux – 11 each (equal 17th in the league)
- Best bowling figures in an innings: Ella Hayward – 4/16 (4 overs) vs Melbourne Stars, 15 November
- Most catches: Molly Strano – 6 (equal 11th in the league)
- Player of the Match awards:
  - Lizelle Lee, Carly Leeson, Courtney Webb – 1 each
- WBBL|06 Young Gun: Courtney Webb (week 4 nominee)
- Renegades Most Valuable Player: Courtney Webb
