= 2018–19 Perth Scorchers WBBL season =

Perth Scorchers
2018–19 season
- Perth Scorchers 2018–19 cap logo
- Coach: Lisa Keightley
- Captain(s): Meg Lanning
- Home ground: Lilac Hill Park
- League: WBBL
- Record: 7–7 (5th)
- Finals: DNQ
- Leading Run Scorer: Elyse Villani – 403
- Leading Wicket Taker: Heather Graham – 22
- Player of the Season: Heather Graham

The 2018–19 Perth Scorchers Women's season was the fourth in the team's history. Coached by Lisa Keightley and captained by Meg Lanning, they finished fifth in the regular season of WBBL|04 and consequently failed to qualify for the finals for the first time.

== Squad ==
Each 2018–19 squad featured 15 active players, with an allowance of up to five marquee signings including a maximum of three from overseas. Under a new rule, Australian marquees were classed as players who held a national women's team contract at the time of signing on for their WBBL|04 team.

Personnel changes before and during the season included:

- Overseas marquee Katherine Brunt, who had won the team's Most Valuable Player award for the first three seasons, and fellow English player Nat Sciver would not return for WBBL|04.
- The Scorchers filled their vacant marquee positions with England players Kate Cross and Amy Jones. Cross, who had previously played in the WBBL for the Brisbane Heat, and Jones, who had previously won a WBBL title as a replacement player with the Sydney Sixers, entered the season with cricket experience in Perth as members of the Western Fury in the WNCL.
- 19-year-old fast bowler Hayleigh Brennan joined the Scorchers, having played for the Melbourne Stars in the previous season.
- Meg Lanning assumed the captaincy, having missed the entirety of the previous season after undergoing shoulder surgery. She would, however, continue to deal with more injury issues throughout WBBL|04, leaving Elyse Villani to stand in as acting captain for five matches.
- Nicole Bolton withdrew from the squad for the last three games of the season for personal reasons.
- Hayley Jensen was signed as a replacement player for six games that Lanning and Bolton were collectively unavailable for. A permanent Australian resident, Jensen had played in the two previous WBBL seasons as a local player for the Melbourne Renegades. However, due to earning re-selection in her native New Zealand national team, she could only compete in WBBL|04 as an overseas marquee.
- Bhavisha Devchand joined the squad initially as a local replacement player for Amy Jones who would miss the first game of the season due to a resting policy enforced by the England and Wales Cricket Board. Devchand continued to serve as a replacement player throughout the season for Piepa Cleary, who would miss several games after undergoing surgery on a fractured and dislocated thumb sustained during a practice match, and later for Elyse Villani, who would sit out three games with a hamstring injury.

The table below lists the Scorchers players and their key stats (including runs scored, batting strike rate, wickets taken, economy rate, catches and stumpings) for the season.

No.	Name	Nat.	Birth Date	Batting style	Bowling style	G	R	SR	W	E	C	S	Notes
Batters
5	Mathilda Carmichael	(Australia)	4 April 1994	Right-handed	Right-arm medium	3	20	111.11	–	–	1	–	
22	Lauren Ebsary	(Australia)	15 March 1983	Right-handed	Right-arm medium	14	185	108.82	–	–	6	–	
7	Meg Lanning	(Australia)	25 March 1992	Right-handed	Right-arm medium	9	389	137.45	–	–	6	–	Captain, Australian marquee
28	Chloe Piparo	(Australia)	5 September 1994	Right-handed	Right-arm off spin	14	93	102.19	–	–	4	–	
3	Elyse Villani	(Australia)	6 October 1989	Right-handed	Right-arm medium	11	403	112.88	–	–	6	–	Australian marquee
All-rounders
12	Nicole Bolton	(Australia)	17 January 1989	Left-handed	Right-arm off spin	11	192	102.67	12	6.78	3	–	Australian marquee
11	Heather Graham	(Australia)	10 May 1996	Right-handed	Right-arm medium	14	161	87.50	22	7.36	6	–	
Wicket-keepers
4	Megan Banting	(Australia)	11 February 1996	Right-handed	–	–	–	–	–	–	–	–	
40	Amy Jones	(England)	13 June 1993	Right-handed	–	13	240	118.22	–	–	3	4	Overseas marquee
33	Emily Smith	(Australia)	9 January 1995	Right-handed	–	1	–	–	–	–	0	0	
Bowlers
27	Hayleigh Brennan	(Australia)	5 March 1999	Right-handed	Right-arm medium fast	9	11	100.00	1	8.14	1	–	
8	Piepa Cleary	(Australia)	17 July 1996	Right-handed	Right-arm medium fast	4	0	0.00	4	8.53	0	–	
61	Kate Cross	(England)	3 October 1991	Right-handed	Right-arm medium fast	14	70	109.37	6	7.29	7	–	Overseas marquee
24	Bhavisha Devchand	(Australia)	24 December 1992	Right-handed	Right-arm leg spin	4	17	77.27	1	9.60	1	–	Local replacement
31	Hayley Jensen	(New Zealand)	7 October 1992	Right-handed	Right-arm medium	6	30	96.77	8	7.95	1	–	Overseas marquee (replacement)
2	Emma King	(Australia)	25 March 1992	Right-handed	Right-arm off spin	14	8	72.72	8	7.05	2	–	
6	Taneale Peschel	(Australia)	29 August 1994	Right-handed	Right-arm medium fast	13	11	78.57	9	7.60	1	–	

== Ladder ==
Pos	Team	Pld	W	L	NR	Pts	NRR
1	Sydney Sixers (RU)	14	10	4	0	20	0.509
2	Sydney Thunder	14	9	4	1	19	0.479
3	Brisbane Heat (C)	14	9	5	0	18	1.118
4	Melbourne Renegades	14	7	6	1	15	−0.079
5	Perth Scorchers	14	7	7	0	14	−0.476
6	Adelaide Strikers	14	5	8	1	11	−0.336
7	Melbourne Stars	14	5	8	1	11	−0.905
8	Hobart Hurricanes	14	2	12	0	4	−0.364

- The four top ranked teams qualified for the play-off phase

== Fixtures ==
All times are local time

Match 1
1 December 2018
10:40
Scorecard

Hobart Hurricanes; 7/143 (20 overs)	v	Perth Scorchers; 4/147 (19.3 overs)
Georgia Redmayne 49 (48); Heather Graham 3/25 (4 overs)		Elyse Villani 58 (39); Sasha Moloney 2/19 (3 overs)

Perth Scorchers won by 6 wickets (with 3 balls remaining)
CitiPower Centre, St Kilda
Umpires: Daryl Brigham and Darren Close
Player of the match: Elyse Villani (Perth Scorchers)

- Perth Scorchers won the toss and elected to field
- Broadcast by Seven Network and Fox Cricket

Match 5
7 December 2018
19:10 (D/N)
Scorecard

Perth Scorchers; 9/167 (20.0 overs)	v	Sydney Sixers; 4/171 (18.4 overs)
Amy Jones 57 (29); Dane van Niekerk 3/32 (4 overs)		Ellyse Perry 102* (59); Heather Graham 2/33 (3.4 overs)

Sydney Sixers won by 6 wickets (with 8 balls remaining)
North Sydney Oval No. 1
Umpires: Simon Lightbody and Marc Nickl
Player of the match: Ellyse Perry (Sydney Sixers)

- Perth Scorchers won the toss and elected to bat
- Broadcast by Seven Network and Fox Cricket

Match 8
8 December 2018
14:50
Scorecard

Perth Scorchers; 8/103 (20 overs)	v	Brisbane Heat; 3/104 (12.5 overs)
Elyse Villani 45 (55); Sammy-Jo Johnson 2/9 (4 overs)		Jess Jonassen 28* (17); Kate Cross 2/26 (2.5 overs)

Brisbane Heat won by 7 wickets (with 43 balls remaining)
North Sydney Oval No. 1
Umpires: Andrew Hamilton and Ben Treloar
Player of the match: Sammy-Jo Johnson (Brisbane Heat)

- Brisbane Heat won the toss and elected to field
- Broadcast by Seven Network and Fox Cricket

Match 13
15 December 2018
10:00
Scorecard

Melbourne Stars; 9/124 (20 overs)	v	Perth Scorchers; 2/125 (19 overs)
Georgia Elwiss 26 (24); Emma King 2/12 (3 overs)		Elyse Villani 52* (49); Erin Osborne 1/19 (4 overs)

Perth Scorchers won by 8 wickets (with 6 balls remaining)
Casey Fields, Melbourne
Umpires: Dale Ireland and Mattis van Eck
Player of the match: Heather Graham (Perth Scorchers)

- Perth Scorchers won the toss and elected to field

Match 16
16 December 2018
10:00
Scorecard

Perth Scorchers; 7/90 (20 overs)	v	Melbourne Stars; 6/91 (15.3 overs)
Nicole Bolton 36 (44); Kristen Beams 3/13 (3 overs)		Katie Mack 33 (31); Hayley Jensen 2/16 (3 overs)

Melbourne Stars won by 4 wickets (with 27 balls remaining)
Casey Fields, Melbourne
Umpires: Dale Ireland and Mattis van Eck
Player of the match: Katie Mack (Melbourne Stars)

- Melbourne Stars won the toss and elected to field

Match 20
18 December 2018
12:00
Scorecard

Hobart Hurricanes; 7/173 (20 overs)	v	Perth Scorchers; 6/173 (20 overs)
Smriti Mandhana 38 (23); Nicole Bolton 3/20 (4 overs)		Heather Graham 44* (30); Brooke Hepburn 2/22 (4 overs)

Match tied (Perth Scorchers won the one over eliminator)
Blundstone Arena, Hobart
Umpires: Muhammad Qureshi and Jeremiah Matibiri
Player of the match: Heather Graham (Perth Scorchers)

- Hobart Hurricanes won the toss and elected to bat

Match 25
22 December
16:30
Scorecard

Perth Scorchers; 6/122 (20 overs)	v	Melbourne Renegades; 6/123 (17.1 overs)
Heather Graham 42 (41); Lea Tahuhu 2/12 (2 overs)		Jess Cameron 35 (31); Nicole Bolton 3/28 (4 overs)

Melbourne Renegades won by 4 wickets (with 17 balls remaining)
WACA Ground, Perth
Umpires: J Paterson and James Hewitt
Player of the match: Heather Graham (Perth Scorchers)

- Melbourne Renegades won the toss and elected to field

Match 28
23 December
14:00
Scorecard

Perth Scorchers; 2/172 (20 overs)	v	Melbourne Renegades; 6/157 (20 overs)
Meg Lanning 75 (50); Molly Strano 1/29 (3 overs)		Danielle Wyatt 42 (34); Heather Graham 2/32 (4 overs)

Perth Scorchers won by 15 runs
WACA Ground, Perth
Umpires: Dean Trigg and Ashlee Gibbons
Player of the match: Meg Lanning (Perth Scorchers)

- Melbourne Renegades won the toss and elected to field

Match 30
26 December
22:45
Scorecard

Perth Scorchers; 5/136 (20 overs)	v	Brisbane Heat; 5/139 (19.2 overs)
Meg Lanning 70 (56); Haidee Birkett 3/19 (4 overs)		Beth Mooney 35 (28); Nicole Bolton 2/12 (4 overs)

Brisbane Heat won by 5 wickets (with 4 balls remaining)
Optus Stadium, Perth
Attendance:14,983
Umpires: Nathan Johnstone and Trent Steenholdt
Player of the match: Haidee Birkett (Brisbane Heat)

- Brisbane Heat won the toss and elected to field
- Broadcast by Seven Network and Fox Cricket
- Played as a double-header after a men's BBL match

Match 33
29 December
10:00
Scorecard

Sydney Thunder; 5/179 (20 overs)	v	Perth Scorchers; 4/180 (19.5 overs)
Rachael Haynes 50 (40); Piepa Cleary 2/28 (4 overs)		Meg Lanning 76 (40); Nicola Carey 2/35 (4 overs)

Perth Scorchers won by 6 wickets (with 1 ball remaining)
Lilac Hill Park, Perth
Umpires: Ashlee Gibbons and James Hewitt
Player of the match: Meg Lanning (Perth Scorchers)

- Perth Scorchers won the toss and elected to field
- Perth Scorchers set a new record for the highest successful run chase in a WBBL match

The Thunder were catapulted to a score of 5/179 by a late 49-run partnership between Harmanpreet Kaur and Stafanie Taylor (which included 21 runs off the 18th over against the bowling of Taneale Peschel, who had taken 1/12 in her first three overs). Eight overs into the second innings, captain Meg Lanning had scored 71 of the Scorchers' 83 runs. Although Lanning was run out for 76 in the tenth over, Elyse Villani went on to score 66 not out, guiding the Scorchers to a six-wicket victory with one ball remaining. In doing so, the Scorchers set a new WBBL record for highest successful run chase.

Match 35
30 December
10:00
Scorecard

Perth Scorchers; 7/127 (20 overs)	v	Sydney Thunder; 5/124 (20 overs)
Nicole Bolton 50 (41); Lisa Griffith 2/17 (3 overs)		Alex Blackwell 37 (30); Heather Graham 2/8 (3 overs)

Perth Scorchers won by 3 runs
Lilac Hill Park, Perth
Umpires: Trent Steenholdt and J Paterson
Player of the match: Nicole Bolton (Perth Scorchers)

- Sydney Thunder won the toss and elected to field

Match 44
6 January
10:00
Scorecard

Sydney Sixers; 2/183 (20 overs)	v	Perth Scorchers; 151 (19.4 overs)
Ellyse Perry 80* (54); Piepa Cleary 1/27 (3 overs)		Meg Lanning 76 (51); Lauren Cheatle 2/19 (4 overs)

Sydney Sixers won by 32 runs
Lilac Hill Park, Perth
Umpires: Dean Trigg and Trent Steenholdt
Player of the match: Ellyse Perry (Sydney Sixers)

- Sydney Sixers won the toss and elected to bat

Match 51
12 January
10:50
Scorecard

Adelaide Strikers; 7/138 (20 overs)	v	Perth Scorchers; 108 (18.3 overs)
Sophie Devine 59 (48); Heather Graham 2/25 (4 overs)		Lauren Ebsary 38 (30); Danielle Hazell 3/20 (4 overs)

Adelaide Strikers won by 30 runs
Albrecht Oval, Alice Springs
Umpires: Harry Singh and Craig Thomas
Player of the match: Sophie Devine (Adelaide Strikers)

- Adelaide Strikers won the toss and elected to bat
- Venue changed to Albrecht Oval due to an unsafe outfield at Traeger Park

Match 54
13 January
10:50
Scorecard

Adelaide Strikers; 6/140 (20 overs)	v	Perth Scorchers; 0/144 (16.4 overs)
Suzie Bates 39 (35); Emma King 2/19 (4 overs)		Meg Lanning 70* (48); Sophie Devine 0/18 (3 overs)

Perth Scorchers won by 10 wickets (with 20 balls remaining)
Albrecht Oval, Alice Springs
Umpires: Harry Singh and Craig Thomas
Player of the match: Amy Jones (Perth Scorchers)

- Adelaide Strikers won the toss and elected to bat
- Venue changed to Albrecht Oval due to an unsafe outfield at Traeger Park
- Former Australian player Lauren Ebsary made her last WBBL appearance

== Statistics and awards ==
- Most runs: Elyse Villani – 403 (6th in the league)
- Highest score in an innings: Meg Lanning – 76 (40) vs Sydney Thunder, 29 December 2018
- Most wickets: Heather Graham – 22 (equal 1st in the league)
- Best bowling figures in an innings: Nicole Bolton – 3/20 (4 overs) vs Hobart Hurricanes, 18 December 2018
- Most catches (fielder): Kate Cross – 7 (equal 9th in the league)
- Player of the Match awards:
  - Heather Graham – 3
  - Meg Lanning – 2
  - Nicole Bolton, Amy Jones, Elyse Villani – 1 each
- Scorchers Player of the Year: Heather Graham
- WBBL|04 Player of the Tournament: Meg Lanning (equal 4th), Elyse Villani (7th)
- WBBL|04 Team of the Tournament: Heather Graham, Meg Lanning
