= 2020–21 Perth Scorchers WBBL season =

Perth Scorchers
2020–21 season
- Perth Scorchers 2020–21 cap logo
- Coach: Shelley Nitschke
- Captain(s): Sophie Devine
- League: WBBL
- Record: 6–6 (4th)
- Finals: Semi-finalists
- Leading Run Scorer: Beth Mooney – 551
- Leading Wicket Taker: Sarah Glenn – 17
- Player of the Season: Beth Mooney

The 2020–21 Perth Scorchers Women's season was the sixth in the team's history. Coached by Shelley Nitschke and captained by Sophie Devine, the Scorchers played the entirety of WBBL|06 in a bio-secure Sydney hub due to the COVID-19 pandemic and, for the second year in a row, were eliminated in the semi-finals. In her first season with the Scorchers, Devine was named the league-wide Player of the Tournament, earning the same award that she won in WBBL|05 while playing for the Adelaide Strikers.

== Squad ==
Each 2020–21 squad is to be made up of 15 active players. Teams can sign up to five 'marquee players', with a maximum of three of those from overseas. Marquees are classed as any overseas player, or a local player who holds a Cricket Australia national contract at the start of the WBBL|06 signing period.

Personnel changes made ahead of the season included:

- Shelley Nitschke was appointed head coach of the Scorchers, replacing Lisa Keightley who departed to take on the role as coach of England.
- Meg Lanning departed the Scorchers after three seasons, returning to the Melbourne Stars where she played the first two WBBL seasons.
- Beth Mooney signed a two-year contract with the Scorchers, departing the Brisbane Heat.
- New Zealand marquee Sophie Devine signed with the Scorchers, having played the five previous seasons with the Adelaide Strikers. Devine was also announced as the team's new captain.
- Georgia Redmayne departed the Scorchers, signing with the Brisbane Heat.
- England marquee Nat Sciver departed the Scorchers, returning to the Melbourne Stars where she played the first two WBBL seasons.
- England marquee Sarah Glenn signed with the Scorchers, marking her first appearance in the WBBL.
- New Zealand marquee Lauren Down was signed from the reserve player pool. She played five matches for the Scorchers from 1–11 November, replacing Amy Jones (quad injury).

The table below lists the Scorchers players and their key stats (including runs scored, batting strike rate, wickets taken, economy rate, catches and stumpings) for the season.

No.	Name	Nat.	Birth Date	Batting style	Bowling style	G	R	SR	W	E	C	S	Notes
Batters
4	Megan Banting	(Australia)	11 February 1996	Right-handed	–	11	44	102.32	–	–	1	–	
5	Mathilda Carmichael	(Australia)	4 April 1994	Right-handed	Right-arm medium	5	69	125.45	–	–	2	–	
18	Lauren Down	(New Zealand)	7 May 1995	Right-handed	Right-arm medium	7	26	96.29	–	–	3	–	Overseas marquee (replacement)
40	Amy Jones	(England)	13 June 1993	Right-handed	–	6	39	79.59	–	–	1	–	Overseas marquee
28	Chloe Piparo	(Australia)	5 September 1994	Right-handed	Right-arm off spin	14	117	106.36	–	–	2	–	
All-rounders
12	Nicole Bolton	(Australia)	17 January 1989	Left-handed	Right-arm off spin	14	134	92.41	10	7.04	3	–	
77	Sophie Devine	(New Zealand)	1 September 1989	Right-handed	Right-arm medium fast	12	460	126.37	6	7.28	7	–	Captain, overseas marquee
11	Heather Graham	(Australia)	10 May 1996	Right-handed	Right-arm medium	13	103	91.15	12	6.89	5	–	
	Georgia Wyllie	(Australia)	3 May 2002	Right-handed	Left-arm medium	–	–	–	–	–	–	–	
Wicket-keeper
10	Beth Mooney	(Australia)	14 January 1994	Left-handed	–	14	551	117.73	–	–	5	3	Australian marquee
Bowlers
15	Jemma Barsby	(Australia)	4 October 1995	Left-handed	Right-arm off spin	12	25	75.75	0	8.07	0	–	
14	Samantha Betts	(Australia)	16 February 1996	Right-handed	Right-arm medium fast	5	–	–	3	6.31	1	–	
8	Piepa Cleary	(Australia)	17 July 1996	Right-handed	Right-arm medium fast	13	3	75.00	3	7.33	2	–	
3	Sarah Glenn	(England)	27 August 1999	Right-handed	Right-arm leg spin	14	35	106.06	17	6.25	2	–	Overseas marquee
2	Emma King	(Australia)	25 March 1992	Right-handed	Right-arm off spin	–	–	–	–	–	–	–	
6	Taneale Peschel	(Australia)	29 August 1994	Right-handed	Right-arm medium fast	14	12	92.30	13	6.13	1	–	

== Ladder ==
Pos	Team	Pld	W	L	NR	Pts	NRR
1	Melbourne Stars (RU)	14	8	3	3	19	0.965
2	Brisbane Heat	14	8	4	2	18	0.543
3	Sydney Thunder (C)	14	7	5	2	16	0.344
4	Perth Scorchers	14	6	6	2	14	0.355
5	Sydney Sixers	14	6	6	2	14	−0.084
6	Adelaide Strikers	14	6	7	1	13	0.135
7	Melbourne Renegades	14	4	8	2	10	−1.008
8	Hobart Hurricanes	14	3	9	2	8	−1.143

- The top 4 teams advance to the play-off phase

== Fixtures ==
All times are local time

=== Regular season ===
Match 1
25 October 2020
10:20
Scorecard

Perth Scorchers; 7/132 (20 overs)	v	Brisbane Heat; 3/134 (17 overs)
Beth Mooney 37 (33); Nicola Hancock 2/25 (3 overs)		Grace Harris 53 (37); Heather Graham 1/14 (3 overs)

Brisbane Heat won by 7 wickets (with 18 balls remaining)
North Sydney Oval
Umpires: Nathan Johnstone and Greg Davidson
Player of the match: Grace Harris (Brisbane Heat)

- Brisbane Heat won the toss and elected to field
- Broadcast by Seven Network and Fox Cricket

Match 7
26 October 2020
14:30
Scorecard

Perth Scorchers	v	Hobart Hurricanes

Match abandoned
Hurstville Oval
Umpires: Simon Lightbody and Bede Sajowitz

- No toss
- No play was possible due to rain
- Broadcast by Cricket Network

Match 10
31 October 2020
14:30
Scorecard

Melbourne Renegades; 5/105 (20 overs)	v	Perth Scorchers; 0/62 (9.5 overs)
Courtney Webb 33 (44); Nicole Bolton 2/13 (4 overs)		Sophie Devine 31* (28)

Perth Scorchers won by 18 runs (DLS method)
Drummoyne Oval
Umpires: Bede Sajowitz and Stephen Dionysius
Player of the match: Sophie Devine (Perth Scorchers)

- Perth Scorchers won the toss and elected to field
- No further play was possible due to rain
- Broadcast by Cricket Network

Match 13
1 November 2020
09:30
Scorecard

Adelaide Strikers; 4/70 (10 overs)	v	Perth Scorchers; 1/25 (2.5 overs)
Stafanie Taylor 30 (16); Taneale Peschel 2/5 (2 overs)		Beth Mooney 12* (8); Darcie Brown 1/9 (1 over)

No result
Drummoyne Oval
Umpires: Muhammad Qureshi and Jeremiah Matibiri

- Perth Scorchers won the toss and elected to field
- Match reduced to 10 overs per side due to rain delay
- Perth Scorchers were set a revised target of 52 from 7 overs due to further rain delay
- No further play was possible due to rain
- Broadcast by Cricket Network

Match 19
4 November 2020
14:30
Scorecard

Sydney Thunder; 4/144 (20 overs)	v	Perth Scorchers; 120 (19.4 overs)
Rachael Haynes 61* (51); Piepa Cleary 1/8 (1 over)		Beth Mooney 61 (49); Samantha Bates 3/9 (4 overs)

Sydney Thunder won by 24 runs
Blacktown International Sportspark
Umpires: Roberto Howard and Stephen Dionysius
Player of the match: Rachael Haynes (Sydney Thunder)

- Perth Scorchers won the toss and elected to field
- Broadcast by Fox Cricket and Cricket Network

Match 24
7 November 2020
19:05 (D/N)
Scorecard

Perth Scorchers; 118 (20 overs)	v	Melbourne Stars; 2/120 (15.2 overs)
Heather Graham 29 (30); Alana King 2/16 (4 overs)		Meg Lanning 51* (38); Piepa Cleary 1/13 (2 overs)

Melbourne Stars won by 8 wickets (with 28 balls remaining)
North Sydney Oval
Umpires: Simon Lightbody and Stephen Dionysius
Player of the match: Nat Sciver (Melbourne Stars)

- Melbourne Stars won the toss and elected to field
- Broadcast by Seven Network and Fox Cricket

Match 28
8 November 2020
14:30
Scorecard

Perth Scorchers; 4/183 (20 overs)	v	Sydney Sixers; 5/147 (20 overs)
Sophie Devine 103 (68); Dane van Niekerk 2/33 (4 overs)		Marizanne Kapp 68* (53); Taneale Peschel 2/28 (4 overs)

Perth Scorchers won by 36 runs
Hurstville Oval
Umpires: Roberto Howard and Muhammad Qureshi
Player of the match: Sophie Devine (Perth Scorchers)

- Perth Scorchers won the toss and elected to bat
- Broadcast by Cricket Network

Match 31
11 November 2020
14:30
Scorecard

Sydney Sixers; 4/137 (20 overs)	v	Perth Scorchers; 5/138 (19.1 overs)
Ellyse Perry 62* (52); Nicole Bolton 1/19 (3 overs)		Beth Mooney 75* (64); Stella Campbell 1/17 (2 overs)

Perth Scorchers won by 5 wickets (with 5 balls remaining)
Blacktown International Sportspark
Umpires: Steven Farrell and Eloise Sheridan
Player of the match: Beth Mooney (Perth Scorchers)

- Sydney Sixers won the toss and elected to bat
- Broadcast by Fox Cricket and Cricket Network

Match 33
14 November 2020
12:15
Scorecard

Melbourne Renegades; 3/122 (20 overs)	v	Perth Scorchers; 1/123 (14.5 overs)
Amy Satterthwaite 48* (56); Taneale Peschel 2/17 (4 overs)		Sophie Devine 77* (54); Sophie Molineux 1/25 (2.5 overs)

Perth Scorchers won by 9 wickets (with 31 balls remaining)
Sydney Showground Stadium
Umpires: Steven Farrell and Ben Treloar
Player of the match: Sophie Devine (Perth Scorchers)

- Perth Scorchers won the toss and elected to field
- Broadcast by Seven Network and Fox Cricket
- Sophie Devine became the first player to hit 100 career sixes in the WBBL

Match 39
15 November 2020
10:20
Scorecard

Perth Scorchers; 8/131 (20 overs)	v	Sydney Thunder; 97 (18.3 overs)
Sophie Devine 45 (44); Hannah Darlington 3/21 (4 overs)		Heather Knight 44 (44); Heather Graham 3/22 (3.3 overs)

Perth Scorchers won by 34 runs
Sydney Showground Stadium
Umpires: Steven Farrell and Claire Polosak
Player of the match: Sophie Devine (Perth Scorchers)

- Perth Scorchers won the toss and elected to bat
- Broadcast by Seven Network and Fox Cricket

Match 42
17 November 2020
14:30
Scorecard

Melbourne Stars; 8/149 (20 overs)	v	Perth Scorchers; 8/143 (20 overs)
Meg Lanning 57 (39); Nicole Bolton 3/25 (4 overs)		Beth Mooney 45 (30); Sophie Day 3/16 (4 overs)

Melbourne Stars won by 6 runs
Hurstville Oval
Umpires: Claire Polosak and Andrew Crozier
Player of the match: Meg Lanning (Melbourne Stars)

- Perth Scorchers won the toss and elected to field
- Broadcast by Cricket Network
- Melbourne Stars qualified for finals

Match 45
18 November 2020
09:30
Scorecard

Perth Scorchers; 8/137 (20 overs)	v	Brisbane Heat; 6/139 (19.2 overs)
Beth Mooney 49 (39); Grace Harris 2/19 (3 overs)		Laura Kimmince 40* (17); Sarah Glenn 4/31 (4 overs)

Brisbane Heat won by 4 wickets (with 4 balls remaining)
Hurstville Oval
Umpires: Ben Treloar and Andrew Crozier
Player of the match: Laura Kimmince (Brisbane Heat)

- Brisbane Heat won the toss and elected to field
- Broadcast by Cricket Network

Match 51
21 November 2020
15:40
Scorecard

Hobart Hurricanes; 6/136 (20 overs)	v	Perth Scorchers; 0/140 (14.4 overs)
Nicola Carey 36 (31); Samantha Betts 2/24 (4 overs)		Sophie Devine 87* (53)

Perth Scorchers won by 10 wickets (with 32 balls remaining)
North Sydney Oval
Umpires: Claire Polosak and Eloise Sheridan
Player of the match: Sophie Devine (Perth Scorchers)

- Perth Scorchers won the toss and elected to field
- Broadcast by Seven Network and Fox Cricket
- Adelaide Strikers, Hobart Hurricanes and Melbourne Renegades were eliminated from finals contention

Match 54
22 November 2020
10:20
Scorecard

Adelaide Strikers; 6/159 (20 overs)	v	Perth Scorchers; 7/156 (20 overs)
Amanda-Jade Wellington 48 (25); Sarah Glenn 4/18 (4 overs)		Beth Mooney 60 (48); Alex Price 1/12 (2 overs)

Adelaide Strikers won by 3 runs
North Sydney Oval
Umpires: Ben Treloar and Sharad Patel
Player of the match: Amanda-Jade Wellington (Adelaide Strikers)

- Perth Scorchers won the toss and elected to field
- Broadcast by Seven Network and Fox Cricket

=== Knockout phase ===
Semi-final 1
25 November 2020
19:10 (D/N)
Scorecard

Perth Scorchers; 8/125 (20 overs)	v	Melbourne Stars; 3/127 (16.2 overs)
Nicole Bolton 32 (25); Alana King 3/16 (4 overs)		Nat Sciver 47* (45); Sophie Devine 1/17 (2.2 overs)

Melbourne Stars won by 7 wickets (with 22 balls remaining)
North Sydney Oval
Umpires: Troy Penman and Claire Polosak
Player of the match: Alana King (Melbourne Stars)

- Melbourne Stars won the toss and elected to field
- Broadcast by Seven Network and Fox Cricket

== Statistics and awards ==
- Most runs: Beth Mooney – 551 (1st in the league)
- Highest score in an innings: Sophie Devine – 103 (68) vs Sydney Sixers, 8 November
- Most wickets: Sarah Glenn – 17 (equal 6th in the league)
- Best bowling figures in an innings: Sarah Glenn – 4/18 (4 overs) vs Adelaide Strikers, 22 November
- Most catches: Sophie Devine – 7 (equal 6th in the league)
- Player of the Match awards:
  - Sophie Devine – 5
  - Beth Mooney – 1
- WBBL|06 Player of the Tournament: Sophie Devine (1st)
- WBBL|06 Team of the Tournament: Sophie Devine, Beth Mooney, Taneale Peschel
- Scorchers Most Valuable Player: Beth Mooney
