= 2020–21 Adelaide Strikers WBBL season =

Adelaide Strikers
2020–21 season
- Adelaide Strikers 2020–21 cap logo
- Coach: Luke Williams
- Captain(s): Suzie Bates
- League: WBBL
- Record: 6–7 (6th)
- Finals: DNQ
- Leading Run Scorer: Laura Wolvaardt – 347
- Leading Wicket Taker: Sarah Coyte – 18
- Player of the Season: Sarah Coyte

The 2020–21 Adelaide Strikers Women's season was the sixth in the team's history. Coached by Luke Williams and captained by Suzie Bates, the Strikers played the entirety of WBBL|06 in a bio-secure Sydney hub due to the COVID-19 pandemic. They finished the regular season in sixth place, missing out on qualifying for the finals.

== Squad ==
Each 2020–21 squad was made up of 15 active players. Teams could sign up to five 'marquee players', with a maximum of three of those from overseas. Marquees are classed as any overseas player, or a local player who holds a Cricket Australia national contract at the start of the WBBL|06 signing period.

Personnel changes made ahead of, and during, the season included:

- New Zealand marquee Sophie Devine departed the Strikers after five seasons with the team, signing with the Perth Scorchers.
- South Africa marquee Laura Wolvaardt returned to the league after a season's absence, signing with the Strikers. Wolvaardt had previously been a member of two WBBL campaigns with the Brisbane Heat.
- Madeline Penna signed with the Strikers, having played with the Melbourne Stars in WBBL|05 as an injury replacement.
- New Zealand marquee Katie Perkins was signed from the reserve player pool, replacing Suzie Bates (shoulder) for the match on 26 October.
- Megan Schutt stood in as captain for the first seven games of the season, replacing Suzie Bates who was sidelined with a shoulder injury originally sustained a month earlier during New Zealand's tour of Australia. Bates joined the line-up on 10 November against the Melbourne Stars but aggravated her shoulder injury during the match and was forced to the leave the field immediately. She was ruled out for the remainder of the tournament, and Schutt took over as acting captain again for the final six games of the season.

The table below lists the Strikers players and their key stats (including runs scored, batting strike rate, wickets taken, economy rate, catches and stumpings) for the season.

No.	Name	Nat.	Birth date	Batting style	Bowling style	G	R	SR	W	E	C	S	Notes
Batters
11	Suzie Bates	(New Zealand)	16 September 1987	Right-handed	Right-arm medium	1	28	121.73	–	–	0	–	Captain, overseas marquee
2	Katie Mack	(Australia)	14 September 1993	Right-handed	Right-arm leg spin	14	251	109.60	–	–	2	–	
5	Annie O'Neil	(Australia)	18 February 1999	Right-handed	Right-arm leg spin	1	2	40.00	–	–	–	–	
21	Bridget Patterson	(Australia)	4 December 1994	Right-handed	Right-arm medium	14	82	75.92	–	–	5	–	
31	Katie Perkins	(New Zealand)	7 July 1988	Right-handed	Right-arm medium	1	–	–	–	–	0	–	Overseas marquee (replacement)
14	Laura Wolvaardt	(South Africa)	26 April 1999	Right-handed	–	14	347	104.83	–	–	4	–	Overseas marquee
All-rounders
9	Tahlia McGrath	(Australia)	10 November 1995	Right-handed	Right-arm medium	14	227	82.24	10	6.97	5	–	Australian marquee
8	Madeline Penna	(Australia)	30 August 2000	Right-handed	Right-arm leg spin	14	173	120.97	3	9.25	4	–	
28	Stafanie Taylor	(Jamaica)	11 June 1991	Right-handed	Right-arm off spin	10	226	113.00	1	7.81	3	–	Overseas marquee
10	Amanda-Jade Wellington	(Australia)	29 May 1997	Right-handed	Right-arm leg spin	14	164	138.98	17	7.81	2	–	
Wicket-keepers
7	Tegan McPharlin	(Australia)	7 August 1988	Right-handed	–	14	80	137.93	–	–	9	5	
Bowlers
20	Darcie Brown	(Australia)	7 March 2003	Right-handed	Right-arm fast	12	0	–	10	5.52	1	–	
15	Sarah Coyte	(Australia)	30 March 1991	Right-handed	Right-arm medium fast	14	35	175.00	18	6.51	4	–	
3	Ellie Falconer	(Australia)	3 August 1999	Right-handed	Right-arm medium fast	–	–	–	–	–	–	–	
12	Alex Price	(Australia)	5 November 1995	Right-handed	Right-arm off spin	3	–	–	2	7.73	1	–	
27	Megan Schutt	(Australia)	15 January 1993	Right-handed	Right-arm medium fast	14	11	110.00	11	6.04	3	–	Australian marquee

== Ladder ==
Pos	Team	Pld	W	L	NR	Pts	NRR
1	Melbourne Stars (RU)	14	8	3	3	19	0.965
2	Brisbane Heat	14	8	4	2	18	0.543
3	Sydney Thunder (C)	14	7	5	2	16	0.344
4	Perth Scorchers	14	6	6	2	14	0.355
5	Sydney Sixers	14	6	6	2	14	−0.084
6	Adelaide Strikers	14	6	7	1	13	0.135
7	Melbourne Renegades	14	4	8	2	10	−1.008
8	Hobart Hurricanes	14	3	9	2	8	−1.143

- The top 4 teams advance to the play-off phase

== Fixtures ==
All times are local time

Match 2
25 October 2020
10:30
Scorecard

Hobart Hurricanes; 84 (16.3 overs)	v	Adelaide Strikers; 2/85 (14 overs)
Naomi Stalenberg 28 (28); Darcie Brown 3/13 (4 overs)		Laura Wolvaardt 51* (42); Chloe Tryon 1/13 (3 overs)

Adelaide Strikers won by 8 wickets (with 36 balls remaining)
Hurstville Oval
Umpires: Muhammad Qureshi and Bede Sajowitz
Player of the match: Laura Wolvaardt (Adelaide Strikers)

- Adelaide Strikers won the toss and elected to field
- Broadcast by Cricket Network

Match 8
26 October 2020
14:30
Scorecard

Adelaide Strikers; 7/68 (9 overs)	v	Sydney Sixers; 1/47 (5.4 overs)
Bridget Patterson 28 (14); Marizanne Kapp 3/14 (2 overs)		Alyssa Healy 27 (16); Sarah Coyte 1/10 (1 over)

Sydney Sixers won by 9 wickets (with 2 balls remaining) (D/L method)
North Sydney Oval
Umpires: Stephen Dionysius and Greg Davidson
Player of the match: Alyssa Healy (Sydney Sixers)

- Sydney Sixers won the toss and elected to field
- Match reduced to 9 overs per side due to rain
- Sydney Sixers were set a revised target of 46 runs from 6 overs due to further rain delays
- Broadcast by Cricket Network

Match 9
31 October 2020
12:15
Scorecard

Sydney Thunder; 6/190 (20 overs)	v	Adelaide Strikers; 8/132 (20 overs)
Heather Knight 83 (39); Sarah Coyte 3/32 (4 overs)		Tahlia McGrath 46 (37); Lauren Smith 3/26 (4 overs)

Sydney Thunder won by 58 runs
Sydney Showground Stadium
Umpires: Nathan Johnstone and Jeremiah Matibiri
Player of the match: Heather Knight (Sydney Thunder)

- Adelaide Strikers won the toss and elected to field
- Broadcast by Seven Network and Fox Cricket

Match 13
1 November 2020
09:30
Scorecard

Adelaide Strikers; 4/70 (10 overs)	v	Perth Scorchers; 1/25 (2.5 overs)
Stafanie Taylor 30 (16); Taneale Peschel 2/5 (2 overs)		Beth Mooney 12* (8); Darcie Brown 1/9 (1 over)

No result
Drummoyne Oval
Umpires: Muhammad Qureshi and Jeremiah Matibiri

- Perth Scorchers won the toss and elected to field
- Match reduced to 10 overs per side due to rain delay
- Perth Scorchers were set a revised target of 52 from 7 overs due to further rain delay
- No further play was possible due to rain
- Broadcast by Cricket Network

Match 18
3 November 2020
19:05 (D/N)
Scorecard

Adelaide Strikers; 6/154 (20 overs)	v	Melbourne Stars; 3/159 (19.4 overs)
Laura Wolvaardt 68 (50); Alana King 2/23 (4 overs)		Meg Lanning 69 (58); Madeline Penna 2/11 (2 overs)

Melbourne Stars won by 7 wickets (with 2 balls remaining)
Blacktown International Sportspark
Umpires: David Taylor and Simon Lightbody
Player of the match: Meg Lanning (Melbourne Stars)

- Melbourne Stars won the toss and elected to field
- Broadcast by Fox Cricket and Cricket Network

Match 21
7 November 2020
12:15
Scorecard

Adelaide Strikers; 8/153 (20 overs)	v	Brisbane Heat; 8/135 (20 overs)
Katie Mack 50 (37); Jess Jonassen 2/25 (4 overs)		Georgia Redmayne 65 (47); Amanda-Jade Wellington 2/19 (3 overs)

Adelaide Strikers won by 18 runs
North Sydney Oval
Umpires: David Taylor and Jeremiah Matibiri
Player of the match: Katie Mack (Adelaide Strikers)

- Brisbane Heat won the toss and elected to field
- Broadcast by Seven Network and Fox Cricket

Match 26
8 November 2020
10:20
Scorecard

Adelaide Strikers; 9/127 (20 overs)	v	Melbourne Renegades; 8/121 (20 overs)
Stafanie Taylor 60 (48); Sophie Molineux 3/20 (4 overs)		Georgia Wareham 42 (32); Sarah Coyte 2/21 (4 overs)

Adelaide Strikers won by 6 runs
North Sydney Oval
Umpires: Nathan Johnstone and David Taylor
Player of the match: Stafanie Taylor (Adelaide Strikers)

- Adelaide Strikers won the toss and elected to bat
- Broadcast by Seven Network and Fox Cricket

Match 29
10 November 2020
14:30
Scorecard

Adelaide Strikers; 7/140 (20 overs)	v	Melbourne Stars; 5/144 (19.3 overs)
Laura Wolvaardt 46 (40); Nat Sciver 4/29 (4 overs)		Mignon du Preez 61 (51); Sarah Coyte 2/16 (4 overs)

Melbourne Stars won by 5 wickets (with 3 balls remaining)
Blacktown International Sportspark
Umpires: Greg Davidson and Andrew Crozier
Player of the match: Nat Sciver (Melbourne Stars)

- Melbourne Stars won the toss and elected to field
- Broadcast by Fox Cricket and Cricket Network

Match 34
14 November 2020
14:30
Scorecard

Brisbane Heat; 7/136 (20 overs)	v	Adelaide Strikers; 7/122 (20 overs)
Laura Kimmince 41 (17); Amanda-Jade Wellington 4/24 (3 overs)		Tahlia McGrath 52 (62); Grace Harris 4/16 (3 overs)

Brisbane Heat won by 14 runs
Drummoyne Oval
Umpires: David Taylor and Sharad Patel
Player of the match: Laura Kimmince (Brisbane Heat)

- Adelaide Strikers won the toss and elected to field
- Broadcast by Cricket Network

Match 37
15 November 2020
09:30
Scorecard

Adelaide Strikers; 8/119 (20 overs)	v	Sydney Sixers; 9/105 (20 overs)
Tegan McPharlin 41* (26); Ellyse Perry 3/14 (4 overs)		Erin Burns 28 (24); Megan Schutt 3/7 (4 overs)

Adelaide Strikers won by 14 runs
Drummoyne Oval
Umpires: Tony Wilds and David Taylor
Player of the match: Tegan McPharlin (Adelaide Strikers)

- Sydney Sixers won the toss and elected to field
- Broadcast by Cricket Network
- Ashleigh Gardner (Sydney Sixers) was replaced by Maddy Darke during the match under the concussion sub rule

Match 41
17 November 2020
09:30
Scorecard

Adelaide Strikers; 6/141 (20 overs)	v	Hobart Hurricanes; 77 (16.4 overs)
Madeline Penna 56* (33); Brooke Hepburn 2/23 (3 overs)		Chloe Tryon 17 (17); Sarah Coyte 3/10 (3 overs)

Adelaide Strikers won by 64 runs
Hurstville Oval
Umpires: Troy Penman and Ben Treloar
Player of the match: Madeline Penna (Adelaide Strikers)

- Hobart Hurricanes won the toss and elected to field
- Broadcast by Cricket Network

Match 47
18 November 2020
14:30
Scorecard

Adelaide Strikers; 6/122 (20 overs)	v	Melbourne Renegades; 3/123 (17.3 overs)
Laura Wolvaardt 36 (40); Carly Leeson 3/14 (4 overs)		Sophie Molineux 52 (43); Amanda-Jade Wellington 1/19 (2 overs)

Melbourne Renegades won by 7 wickets (with 15 balls remaining)
Sydney Showground Stadium
Umpires: Greg Davidson and Eloise Sheridan
Player of the match: Carly Leeson (Melbourne Renegades)

- Adelaide Strikers won the toss and elected to bat
- Broadcast by Fox Cricket and Cricket Network
- Venue changed from Blacktown International Sportspark

Match 50
21 November 2020
14:30
Scorecard

Adelaide Strikers; 6/133 (20 overs)	v	Sydney Thunder; 5/136 (19.4 overs)
Katie Mack 58 (52); Sammy-Jo Johnson 3/25 (4 overs)		Rachel Trenaman 38 (40); Amanda-Jade Wellington 3/33 (4 overs)

Sydney Thunder won by 5 wickets (with 2 balls remaining)
Drummoyne Oval
Umpires: Andrew Crozier and Sharad Patel
Player of the match: Sammy-Jo Johnson (Sydney Thunder)

- Sydney Thunder won the toss and elected to field
- Broadcast by Cricket Network

Match 54
22 November 2020
10:20
Scorecard

Adelaide Strikers; 6/159 (20 overs)	v	Perth Scorchers; 7/156 (20 overs)
Amanda-Jade Wellington 48 (25); Sarah Glenn 4/18 (4 overs)		Beth Mooney 60 (48); Alex Price 1/12 (2 overs)

Adelaide Strikers won by 3 runs
North Sydney Oval
Umpires: Ben Treloar and Sharad Patel
Player of the match: Amanda-Jade Wellington (Adelaide Strikers)

- Perth Scorchers won the toss and elected to field
- Broadcast by Seven Network and Fox Cricket

== Statistics and awards ==
- Most runs: Laura Wolvaardt – 347 (11th in the league)
- Highest score in an innings: Laura Wolvaardt – 68 (50) vs Melbourne Stars, 3 November
- Most wickets: Sarah Coyte – 18 (equal 4th in the league)
- Best bowling figures in an innings: Amanda-Jade Wellington – 4/24 (3 overs) vs Brisbane Heat, 14 November
- Most catches: Tahlia McGrath, Bridget Patterson – 5 each (equal 16th in the league)
- Player of the Match awards: Madeline Penna, Katie Mack, Tegan McPharlin, Stafanie Taylor, Amanda-Jade Wellington, Laura Wolvaardt – 1 each
- WBBL|06 Team of the Tournament: Sarah Coyte, Darcie Brown (12th man)
- WBBL|06 Young Gun: Darcie Brown (winner)
- Strikers Most Valuable Player: Sarah Coyte
