= Amy Edgar =

Australian cricketer

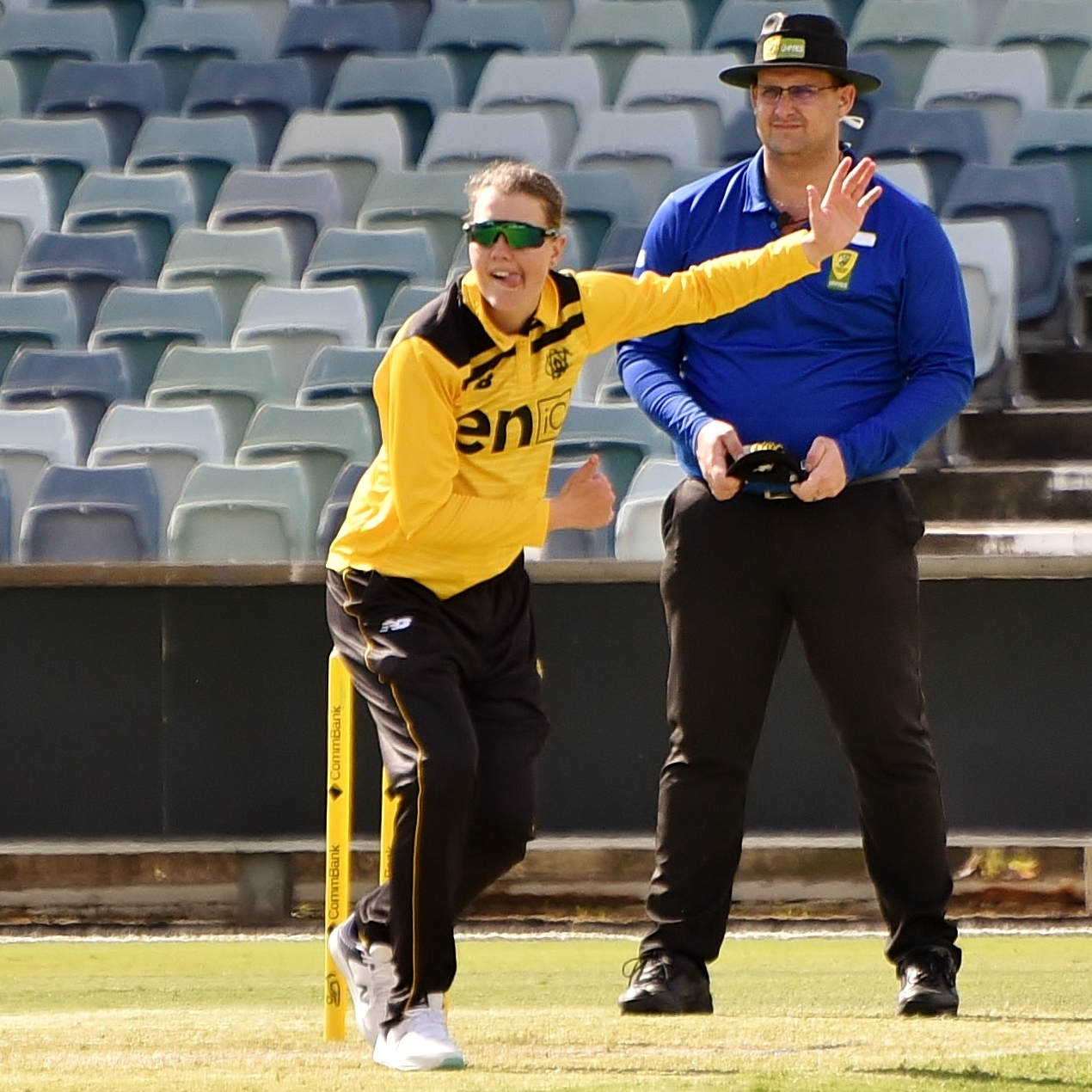
- Edgar bowling for WA in September 2022

Personal information
- Full name: Amy Louise Edgar
- Born: 27 December 1997 (age 28); Narrogin, Western Australia
- Batting: Right-handed
- Bowling: Right-arm off break
- Role: Batter

Domestic team information
- Years: Team
- 2018/19–present: Western Australia
- 2021/22–present: Perth Scorchers

Career statistics
Competition	FC	LA	T20
Matches	1	66	44
Runs scored	13	1,095	257
Batting average	13.00	20.66	14.27
100s/50s	0/0	0/3	0/0
Top score	13	85*	36*
Balls bowled	156	2,115	650
Wickets	6	69	37
Bowling average	14.50	22.43	20.37
5 wickets in innings	1	0	0
10 wickets in match	0	0	0
Best bowling	5/57	4/10	4/19
Catches/stumpings	1/–	25/–	12/–
- Source: CricketArchive, 5 October 2025

Amy Louise Edgar (born 27 December 1997) is an Australian cricketer who plays as a right-handed batter and right-arm off break bowler for Western Australia in the Women's National Cricket League (WNCL) and Perth Scorchers in the Women's Big Bash League (WBBL).

Edgar made her maiden WNCL half-century on 1 February 2019, scoring 67 in a 78-run loss to Tasmania. She spent part of the 2019–20 WBBL with the Perth Scorchers as a local replacement player but did not make an appearance. After a season away from the Scorchers, she made her debut for the side against Sydney Sixers in the 2021–22 WBBL
