= Perth Scorchers (WBBL) =

Women's cricket team

- League: Women's Big Bash League

Personnel
- Captain: Beth Mooney
- Coach: Becky Grundy

Team information
- City: Perth
- Colours: Orange
- Home ground: WACA Ground
- Secondary home ground: Lilac Hill Park

History
- Twenty20 debut: 11 December 2015
- WBBL wins: 1 (WBBL07)
- Official website: Perth Scorchers

The Perth Scorchers are an Australian women's Twenty20 cricket team based in Perth, Western Australia. (Note: Administrative and training base) They compete in the Women's Big Bash League, and won their first championship in WBBL|07.

== History ==
=== Formation ===
One of eight founding WBBL teams, the Perth Scorchers are aligned with the men's team of the same name. On 9 May 2015, the WACA announced Mark Atkinson as the Scorchers' inaugural coach. At the official WBBL launch on 10 July, Jess Cameron was unveiled as the team's first-ever player signing. Nicole Bolton was appointed as Perth's inaugural captain.

The Scorchers faced almost immediate turmoil, however, with Cameron taking an indefinite break from cricket in October (she would return to the league the following season, albeit with the Melbourne Stars). Then, days before the beginning of WBBL|01, Atkinson was replaced in the head coaching role by Lisa Keightley. Despite these unexpected obstacles, the team rallied in their first match on 11 December at Aquinas College to defeat the Brisbane Heat by two runs.

=== Rivalries ===
==== Sydney Thunder ====
The Scorchers and Sydney Thunder have met in two semi-finals:

- 21 January 2016, Adelaide Oval: Defending a total of 6/118, the Thunder restricted the Scorchers to 9/110 and claimed victory by eight runs. The Thunder would go on to win the inaugural WBBL championship.
- 1 February 2018, Perth Stadium: In the first innings, the Scorchers posted a total of 2/148. The Thunder were reeling by the 11th over of the run chase, having lost five wickets for just 46 runs. Fran Wilson piled on 46 runs from 28 balls late in the match but Perth, led by Emma King's 3/17, easily defended the target to win by 27 runs.

A scheduling quirk, the two teams did not meet in the Thunder's home state of New South Wales until WBBL|06 when the entire tournament was played in Sydney due to the COVID-19 pandemic. From 2017 to 2018, five of their regular season encounters were played at Lilac Hill Park and characterised by close finishes, including:

- 7 January 2018: The Scorchers were well poised to chase down their target of 146 until a catch on the boundary by Thunder fielder Lisa Griffith dismissed Nicole Bolton for 71 in the 18th over. On the last ball of the match, Scorchers batter Mathilda Carmichael was run out by a metre while attempting a game-tying run, therefore securing victory for the Thunder by the narrowest of margins.
- 29 December 2018: The Thunder were catapulted to a score of 5/179 by a late 49-run partnership between Harmanpreet Kaur and Stafanie Taylor (which included 21 runs off the 18th over against the bowling of Taneale Peschel, who had taken 1/12 in her first three overs). Eight overs into the second innings, captain Meg Lanning had scored 71 of the Scorchers' 83 runs. Although Lanning was run out for 76 in the tenth over, Elyse Villani went on to score 66 not out, guiding the Scorchers to a six-wicket victory with one ball remaining. In doing so, the Scorchers set a new WBBL record for highest successful run chase.

==== Sydney Sixers ====
The Sydney Sixers have met, and defeated, the Scorchers in two championship deciders:

- 28 January 2017, WACA Ground: With Sydney captain Ellyse Perry sidelined due to a hamstring injury, the Sixers posted a modest total of 5/124 in the first innings. An unbeaten knock of 35 from 30 balls by Katherine Brunt was not enough to secure victory for the Scorchers, as the Sixers "fielded like demons and bowled dry" in a "veritable classic" to win by a narrow seven-run margin and claim their maiden title. Sarah Aley earned Player of the Final honours for her bowling figures of 4/23 off four overs.
- 4 February 2018, Adelaide Oval: Electing to bat first, the Scorchers were steamrolled for 99 all out. The Sixers experienced little difficulty in the run chase, mowing down the required target with nine wickets in hand and 30 balls remaining to claim a second consecutive WBBL title. Sarah Coyte earned Player of the Final honours for her bowling figures of 3/17 off four overs.

==== Brisbane Heat ====
Noteworthy matches between the Scorchers and the Brisbane Heat include:

- 11 December 2015, Aquinas College: The Scorchers, in their first-ever game, successfully defended a total of just 9/106 by bowling out the Heat for 104. Katherine Brunt finished with bowling figures of 4/17 and was also credited for the run out of Holly Ferling on the last ball of the match, securing a two-run victory for the Scorchers.
- 24 January 2017, WACA Ground: In the WBBL|02 semi-finals, Perth chased down the target of 125 with 26 balls remaining. In what was a thumping defeat, the only wicket Brisbane managed to take was that of Elyse Villani, for 52, via run out.
- 26 December 2018, Perth Stadium: Played as a double-header after a men's match in front of a reported crowd of 14,983 spectators (setting a new attendance record for a WBBL game in Western Australia), the Scorchers' total of 5/136 was chased down by the Heat with five wickets in hand and four balls remaining.

==== Adelaide Strikers ====
In the league's early years, the Scorchers and Adelaide Strikers experienced several instances of senior members switching allegiances:

- Inaugural Strikers captain Lauren Ebsary joined the Scorchers after just one season.
- Former Scorchers captain Suzie Bates moved to the Strikers ahead of WBBL|03 and became the first player to lead two WBBL clubs.
- After scoring the most runs for Perth throughout WBBL|01, Charlotte Edwards transferred to Adelaide in her final year of cricket. The following season, Edwards assumed an assistant coaching role for the Strikers.
- Ahead of WBBL|06, former Adelaide all-rounder Shelley Nitschke was appointed to the position of head coach for the Scorchers.

Noteworthy matches between the two teams include:

- 13 January 2018, Traeger Park: In a match reduced to 16 overs per side due to a rain delay, the Scorchers could only muster a first innings score of 9/87. In the run chase, Suzie Bates played a lone hand of 49 not out to help the Strikers win by six wickets with one ball to spare.
- 9 November 2019, Karen Rolton Oval: An innings of 80 runs from 58 deliveries by Amy Jones helped Perth post a total of 3/173. Despite a slow start to the run chase, Adelaide finished strongly with Bridget Patterson scoring 60 off 32 balls. However, Heather Graham conceded just a single off the final ball to give the Scorchers a two-run win.
- 7 December 2019, Allan Border Field: In the WBBL|05 semi-finals, the Strikers comfortably reached the required total of 127 with eight wickets in hand and eleven balls remaining to eliminate the Scorchers from the tournament.

== Captaincy records ==
There have been six captains in the Scorchers' history, including matches featuring an acting captain.

Captain	Span	M	Won	Lost	Tied	NR	W–L%
Nicole Bolton	2015–16	15	7	8	0	0	46.67
Suzie Bates	2016–17	16	9	7	0	0	56.25
Elyse Villani	2017–18	21	11	10	0	0	52.38
Meg Lanning	2018–19	24	14	10	0	0	58.33
Sophie Devine	2020–25	79	41	32	1	5	56.16
Beth Mooney	2020–24	3	1	2	0	0	33.33

Source: (Note: ESPNcricinfo erroneously credited Beth Mooney as the Scorchers' captain for a match on 21 November 2020.)

== Season summaries ==
Chart of yearly table positions for Perth Scorchers in WBBL

Season	W–L	Pos.	Finals	Coach	Captain	Most Runs	Most Wickets	Most Valuable Player	Refs
2015–16	7–7	4th	SF	Lisa Keightley	Nicole Bolton	Charlotte Edwards – 462	Brunt, Shaw – 16	Katherine Brunt	
2016–17	8–6	2nd	RU	Lisa Keightley	Suzie Bates	Elyse Villani – 442	Emma King – 17	Katherine Brunt	
2017–18	8–6	3rd	RU	Lisa Keightley	Elyse Villani	Elyse Villani – 535	Katherine Brunt – 23*	Katherine Brunt	
2018–19	7–7	5th	DNQ	Lisa Keightley	Meg Lanning (Note: Elyse Villani stood in as acting captain for five games.)	Elyse Villani – 403	Heather Graham – 22*	Heather Graham	
2019	9–5	3rd	SF	Lisa Keightley	Meg Lanning	Meg Lanning – 531	Heather Graham – 15	Nat Sciver	
2020	6–6	4th	SF	Shelley Nitschke	Sophie Devine (Note: Beth Mooney stood in as acting captain for two games.)	Beth Mooney – 551*	Sarah Glenn – 17	Beth Mooney	
2021	9–3*	1st*	C	Shelley Nitschke	Sophie Devine	Beth Mooney – 547*	Heather Graham – 18	Sophie Devine	
2022	6–7	5th	DNQ	Shelley Nitschke	Sophie Devine	Beth Mooney – 434*	Alana King – 17	Marizanne Kapp	
2023	8–6	2nd	CF	Becky Grundy	Sophie Devine	Beth Mooney – 557*	Amy Edgar – 20	Sophie Devine	
2024	4–5	5th	DNQ	Becky Grundy	Sophie Devine (Note: Beth Mooney stood in as acting captain for one game.)	Beth Mooney – 386	Alana King – 20*	Alana King	
2025	6–4	3rd	RU	Becky Grundy	Sophie Devine	Beth Mooney – 549*	Sophie Devine – 15	Beth Mooney	

Legend
DNQ	Did not qualify	SF	Semi-finalists	*	Led the league
EF	Lost the Eliminator	RU	Runners-up	^	League record
KF	Lost the Knockout	CF	Lost the Challenger	C	Champions

== Home grounds ==
Venue	Games hosted by season											
Venue	01	02	03	04	05	06	07	08	09	10	11	Total
Aquinas College	2	–	–	–	–	N/A (Note: All WBBL|06 matches were played in Sydney due to the COVID-19 pandemic.)	–	–	–	–	–	2
Lilac Hill Park	–	3	3	3	4	N/A	2	3	–	–	–	18
Optus Stadium	–	–	1	1	–	N/A	1	–	–	–	–	3
WACA Ground	5	5	4	2	3	N/A	3	3	6	4	5	40

== Current squad ==
The squad of the Perth Scorchers for the WBBL|12 as of 28 October 2026.

- Players with international caps are listed in **bold**.

No.	Name	Nat.	Birth Date	Batting style	Bowling style	Notes
Batters
4	Mikayla Hinkley	Australia	1 May 1998 (age 28)	Right-handed	Right-arm medium	
2	Katie Mack	Australia	14 September 1993 (age 33)	Right-handed	Right-arm leg spin	
28	Chloe Piparo	Australia	5 September 1994 (age 32)	Right-handed	Right-arm off spin	
All-rounders
77	**Sophie Devine**	New Zealand	1 September 1989 (age 37)	Right-handed	Right-arm medium	International Signing
9	Amy Edgar	Australia	27 December 1997 (age 28)	Right-handed	Right-arm off spin	
6	**Freya Kemp**	England	21 April 2005 (age 21)	Left-handed	Left-arm medium	International Signing
14	**Fatima Sana**	Pakistan	8 November 2001 (age 24)	Right-handed	Right-arm medium-fast	International Signing
Wicket-keeper
55	**Ines McKeon**	Australia	19 April 2007 (age 19)	Right-handed	—N/a	
10	**Beth Mooney**	Australia	14 January 1994 (age 32)	Left-handed	—N/a	Captain
Bowlers
44	Chloe Ainsworth	Australia	14 September 2005 (age 21)	Right-handed	Right-arm medium	
14	Ebony Hoskin	Australia	23 March 2003 (age 23)	Right-handed	Right-arm fast	
23	**Alana King**	Australia	22 November 1995 (age 30)	Right-handed	Right-arm leg spin	
56	Lilly Mills	Australia	2 January 2001 (age 25)	Right-handed	Right-arm off spin	
6	Taneale Peschel	Australia	29 August 1994 (age 32)	Right-handed	Right-arm medium-fast	
25	Ruby Strange	Australia	25 November 2002 (age 23)	Right-handed	Right-arm medium	

== Players ==
=== Australian representatives ===
(Australia) The following is a list of cricketers who have played for the Scorchers after making their debut in the national women's team (the period they spent as both a Scorchers squad member and an Australian-capped player is in brackets):

- Nicole Bolton (WBBL|01–06)
- Elyse Villani (WBBL|01–04)
- Lauren Ebsary (WBBL|02–04)
- Heather Graham (WBBL|05–07)
- Beth Mooney (WBBL|06–12)
- Holly Ferling (WBBL|08)
- Alana King (WBBL|08–12)
- Stella Campbell (WBBL|09–10)

=== Overseas marquees ===
The following is a list of cricketers who have played for the Scorchers as overseas marquees: (Note: Englishwoman Nicky Shaw was classed as a local player when signing for the Scorchers due to her permanent residence in Australia and having made a lack of recent international cricket appearances.)

- (New Zealand) Suzie Bates (WBBL|01–02)
- (Cricket West Indies) Deandra Dottin (WBBL|01)
- (England) Charlotte Edwards (WBBL|01)
- (England) Katherine Sciver-Brunt (WBBL|01–03)
- (England) Rebecca Grundy (WBBL|02)
- (England) Anya Shrubsole (WBBL|02)
- (New Zealand) Thamsyn Newton (WBBL|03)
- (England) Nat Sciver-Brunt (WBBL|03, 05, 09)
- (England) Kate Cross (WBBL|04)
- (New Zealand) Hayley Jensen (WBBL|04)
- (England) Amy Jones (WBBL|04–06, 09-10)
- (Ireland) Kim Garth (WBBL|05)
- (New Zealand) Sophie Devine (WBBL|06–12)
- (New Zealand) Lauren Down (WBBL|06)
- (England) Sarah Glenn (WBBL|06)
- (Sri Lanka) Chamari Athapaththu (WBBL|07)
- (South Africa) Marizanne Kapp (WBBL|07–08)
- (New Zealand) Maddy Green (WBBL|08)
- (England) Lauren Winfield-Hill (WBBL|09)
- (New Zealand) Hollie Armitage (WBBL|10)
- (India) Dayalan Hemalatha (WBBL|10)
- (England) Freya Kemp (WBBL|11–12)
- (England) Paige Scholfield (WBBL|11)
- (Pakistan) Fatima Sana (WBBL|12)

=== Associate rookies ===
- (Ireland) Laura Delany (WBBL|01)
- (Hong Kong) Emma Lai (WBBL|02)
- (Papua New Guinea) Ravina Oa (WBBL|03)
- (Indonesia) Ni Made Putri Suwandewi (WBBL|10)

== Honours ==
- Champions: 1 – WBBL|07
- Runners-Up: 3 – WBBL|02, WBBL|03, WBBL|11
- Minor Premiers: 1 – WBBL|07
- Finals Appearances: 7 – WBBL|01, WBBL|02, WBBL|03, WBBL|05, WBBL|06, WBBL|07, WBBL|09, WBBL|11
- Wooden Spoons: 0

== Statistics and awards ==
=== Team stats ===
- Win–loss record:

Opposition	M	Won	Lost	Tied	NR	W–L%
Adelaide Strikers	23	9	13	0	1	40.91
Brisbane Heat	23	11	12	0	0	47.83
Hobart Hurricanes	22	12	8	0	2	60
Melbourne Renegades	22	15	6	0	1	71.43
Melbourne Stars	22	12	10	0	0	54.55
Sydney Sixers	23	12	10	1	0	53.55
Sydney Thunder	23	12	10	0	1	54.55
Total	158	83	69	1	5	54.61

- Highest score in an innings: 2/194 (20 overs) vs Melbourne Renegades, 3 November 2021
- Highest successful chase: 4/180 (19.5 overs) vs Sydney Thunder, 29 December 2018
- Lowest successful defence: 9/106 (20 overs) vs Brisbane Heat, 11 December 2015
- Largest victory:
  - Batting first: 104 runs vs Melbourne Renegades, 12 November 2022
  - Batting second: 55 balls remaining vs Melbourne Stars, 10 November 2021
- Longest winning streak: 7 matches (17 November 2021 – 20 October 2022)
- Longest losing streak: 4 matches

=== Individual stats ===
- Most runs: Beth Mooney – 3,024
- Highest score in an innings: Sophie Devine – 106 (62) vs Brisbane Heat, 9 November 2023
- Highest partnership: Sophie Devine and Beth Mooney – 173 vs Sydney Thunder, 24 October 2021
- Most wickets: Heather Graham – 102
- Best bowling figures in an innings: Alana King – 5/16 (4 overs) vs Brisbane Heat, 5 November 2024
- Hat-tricks taken: Nicole Bolton vs Hobart Hurricanes, 19 December 2015
- Most catches (fielder): Chloe Piparo – 36
- Most dismissals (wicket-keeper): Beth Mooney – 57 (36 catches, 21 stumpings)

=== Individual awards ===
- Player of the Match:
  - Sophie Devine – 15
  - Beth Mooney – 14
  - Elyse Villani – 10
  - Heather Graham – 6
  - Nicole Bolton and Meg Lanning – 5
  - Katherine Sciver-Brunt, Charlotte Edwards, Amy Jones, Alana King – 4
  - Chloe Ainsworth and Nat Sciver-Brunt – 3
  - Amy Edgar, Marizanne Kapp, and Emma King – 2
  - Maddy Green and Katie-Jane Hartshorn – 1
- WBBL Player of the Final:
  - Marizanne Kapp – WBBL|07
- WBBL Player of the Tournament:
  - Sophie Devine – WBBL|06
- WBBL Team of the Tournament:
  - Beth Mooney (6) – WBBL|06, WBBL|07, WBBL|08, WBBL|09, WBBL|10, WBBL|11
  - Sophie Devine (4) – WBBL|06, WBBL|07, WBBL|09, WBBL|11
  - Katherine Brunt (2) – WBBL|02, WBBL|03
  - Meg Lanning (2) – WBBL|04, WBBL|05
  - Chloe Ainsworth (2) – WBBL|09, WBBL|10
  - Charlotte Edwards – WBBL|01
  - Nicole Bolton – WBBL|03
  - Elyse Villani – WBBL|03
  - Heather Graham – WBBL|04
  - Taneale Peschel – WBBL|06
  - Amy Edgar – WBBL|09
  - Alana King – WBBL|10
- WBBL Young Gun Award:
  - Chloe Ainsworth – WBBL|10

== Sponsors ==
Year	Kit Manufacturer	Chest Sponsor	Back Sponsor	Breast Sponsor	Sleeve Sponsor
2015–16	Majestic	Rebel	Alcohol. Think Again	Alcohol. Think Again	Rebel
2016–17	Majestic	Rebel	Kleenheat	Kleenheat	Rebel
2017–18	Majestic	Rebel	Kleenheat	Kleenheat	Rebel
2018–19	Majestic	Kleenheat	Kleenheat	Holman	Rebel
2019–20	Majestic	Kleenheat	Canon Foods	Canon Foods	Peet
2020–21	Majestic	REIWA	Canon Foods	Canon Foods	Peet
2021–22	Nike	Peet	PEP Transport	Budget Direct	PEP Transport
2022–23	Nike	Peet	PEP Transport	Budget Direct	PEP Transport
2023–24	Nike	Peet	PEP Transport	Budget Direct	PEP Transport
2024–25	Nike	Peet		Budget Direct	BMD Group
2025–26	New Balance	Peet	Westside Auto Wholesale	Budget Direct	BMD Group

== See also ==
- Cricket in Western Australia
- Western Australian Cricket Association
- Western Fury
