= Nicole Bolton =

Australian cricketer

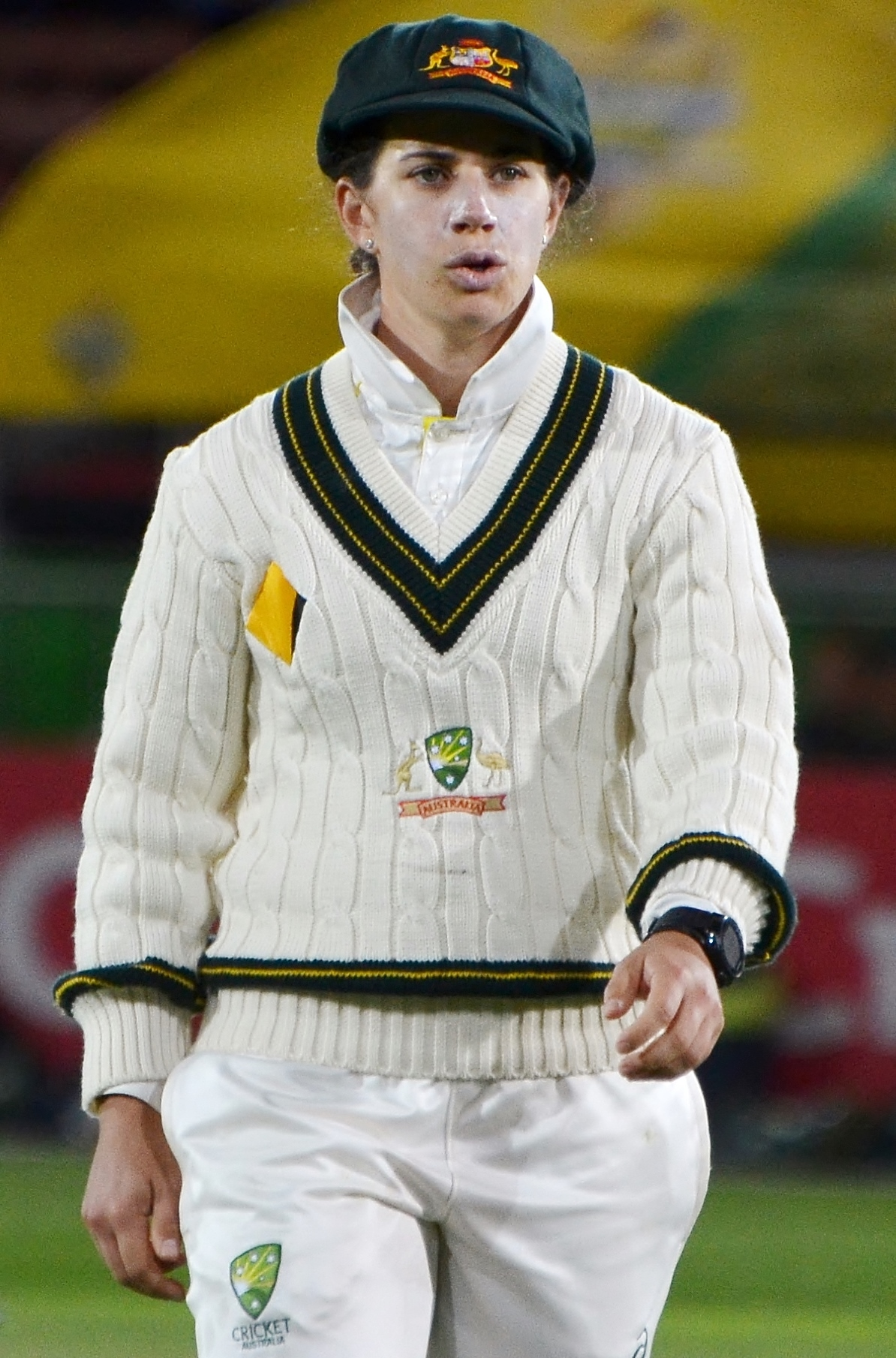
- Bolton during the 2017–18 Women's Ashes Test

Personal information
- Full name: Nicole Elizabeth Bolton
- Born: 17 January 1989 (age 37); Subiaco, Western Australia
- Height: 159 cm (5 ft 3 in)
- Batting: Left-handed
- Bowling: Right-arm off break
- Role: Batter

International information
- National side: Australia
- Test debut (cap 169): 11 August 2015 v England
- Last Test: 18 July 2019 v England
- ODI debut (cap 127): 23 January 2014 v England
- Last ODI: 7 July 2019 v England
- ODI shirt no.: 12
- T20I debut (cap 38): 2 February 2014 v England
- Last T20I: 27 September 2016 v Sri Lanka

Domestic team information
- Years: Team
- 2004/05–2013/14: Western Australia
- 2012/13–2013/14: Otago
- 2014/15: Victoria
- 2015/16–2020/21: Western Australia
- 2015/16–2020/21: Perth Scorchers
- 2018: Lancashire Thunder
- 2021/22–2022/23: Sydney Sixers

Career statistics
Competition	Test	ODI	T20I	LA
Matches	3	50	2	156
Runs scored	91	1,896	6	5,459
Batting average	22.75	41.21	6.00	38.71
100s/50s	0/0	4/12	0/0	13/28
Top score	36	124	6	170*
Balls bowled	30	30	–	2,118
Wickets	0	2	–	57
Bowling average	–	18.00	–	28.68
5 wickets in innings	–	0	–	0
10 wickets in match	–	0	–	0
Best bowling	–	2/18	–	4/15
Catches/stumpings	1/–	14/–	3/–	66/–
- Source: CricketArchive, 6 August 2025

Nicole Elizabeth Bolton is an Australian former cricketer who played as a left-handed batter and right-arm off break bowler for Australia and a number of domestic teams in Australia, New Zealand and England.

== Early life and education ==
Bolton was born in Subiaco, an inner western suburb of Perth, where she was raised and has lived most of her life. Between 1993 and 2003, she went to school at Newman College, Perth, and from 2003 to 2006 she attended Methodist Ladies' College in the Perth suburb of Claremont.

As a young child, Bolton played cricket with her brothers in the back yard of the family home. However, she did not take up the game seriously until she was 15 years old, when she started playing for MLC in an organised competition. She also played at junior level for the Subiaco Marist Cricket Club.

From 2008 to 2011, Bolton studied for a Bachelor of Event, Sport and Recreation Management at Edith Cowan University. In 2016, she completed a Graduate Diploma in Teaching and Learning, Education, at Charles Darwin University.

== Cricket career ==
Bolton made her international debut on 23 January 2014, when she scored 124 runs off 152 balls. She joined Victoria in 2014 but returned to Western Australia in 2015.

In June 2015, she was named as one of Australia's touring party for the 2015 Women's Ashes in England, as a Test and ODI specialist who was not expected to play in the T20 internationals.

In April 2018, she was one of the fourteen players to be awarded a national contract for the 2018–19 season by Cricket Australia. In October 2018, she was named in Australia's squad for the 2018 ICC Women's World Twenty20 tournament in the West Indies.

In November 2018, she was named in the Perth Scorchers' squad for the 2018–19 Women's Big Bash League season. In April 2019, Cricket Australia awarded her with a contract ahead of the 2019–20 season. In June 2019, Cricket Australia named her in Australia's team for their tour to England to contest the Women's Ashes. She returned to the Australian squad, after taking a five-month break from the game dealing with a mental health issue. In October 2021, Bolton announced her retirement from playing state cricket. On 26 November 2022, she retired from all forms of cricket after playing in the Women's Big Bash League final. Bolton is widely considered the best female cricketer from Western Australia.

== One Day International centuries ==
On 23 January 2014, Bolton scored a century during her international debut, in a Women's Ashes multiple format series One Day International (ODI) match against England at the Melbourne Cricket Ground. She was the first Australian woman to score a century on ODI debut, and the first woman of any nationality to score such a century against a team fielded by a Full Member of the International Cricket Council (ICC).

Subsequently, Bolton scored three other ODI centuries, against three other Full Member teams, in three other countries. Her third ODI century was reached during Australia's opening match of the 2017 Women's Cricket World Cup; the other three were scored in bilateral series. Of all the women who have scored four or more ODI centuries, Bolton had the shortest career by number of ODIs, at just 50 matches between 2014 and 2019.

One Day International centuries
Runs	Match	Opponents	City	Venue	Year
124	1	England	Melbourne, Australia	Melbourne Cricket Ground	2014
113	22	Sri Lanka	Colombo, Sri Lanka	R. Premadasa Stadium	2016
107*	31	West Indies	Taunton, England	County Ground	2017
100*	42	India	Vadodara, India	Reliance Stadium	2018

- Source: CricInfo

== Post-retirement ==
=== West Australian Football Commission ===
At the time of her retirement as a player for Western Australia in 2021, Bolton made a conscious decision to avoid becoming a cricket coach immediately. Instead, she accepted an appointment as the Women & Girls Community Football Manager for the West Australian Football Commission.

=== Coaching ===
In December 2022, Bolton was invited by Luke Williams, coach of South Australia and Adelaide Strikers, to become the assistant coach of those teams from June 2023, in place of Jude Coleman, who had been appointed as head coach of Tasmania. After considering the invitation, and joining in South Australia's training and planning sessions while the team was in Perth in January 2023, Bolton decided to take on the role.

== Personal life ==
Bolton's skills as a cook have been praised by her fellow international cricketer Harmanpreet Kaur as "pretty impressive". During Kaur's debut season with Lancashire Thunder in the Kia Super League, the two players shared an apartment. Kaur later told ESPNcricinfo:

"After a point, Bolton realised I couldn't cook (laughs), so she taught me a few egg dishes. That was really nice of her to do."

== See also ==
- List of centuries in women's One Day International cricket
