= Holly Ferling =

Australian cricketer

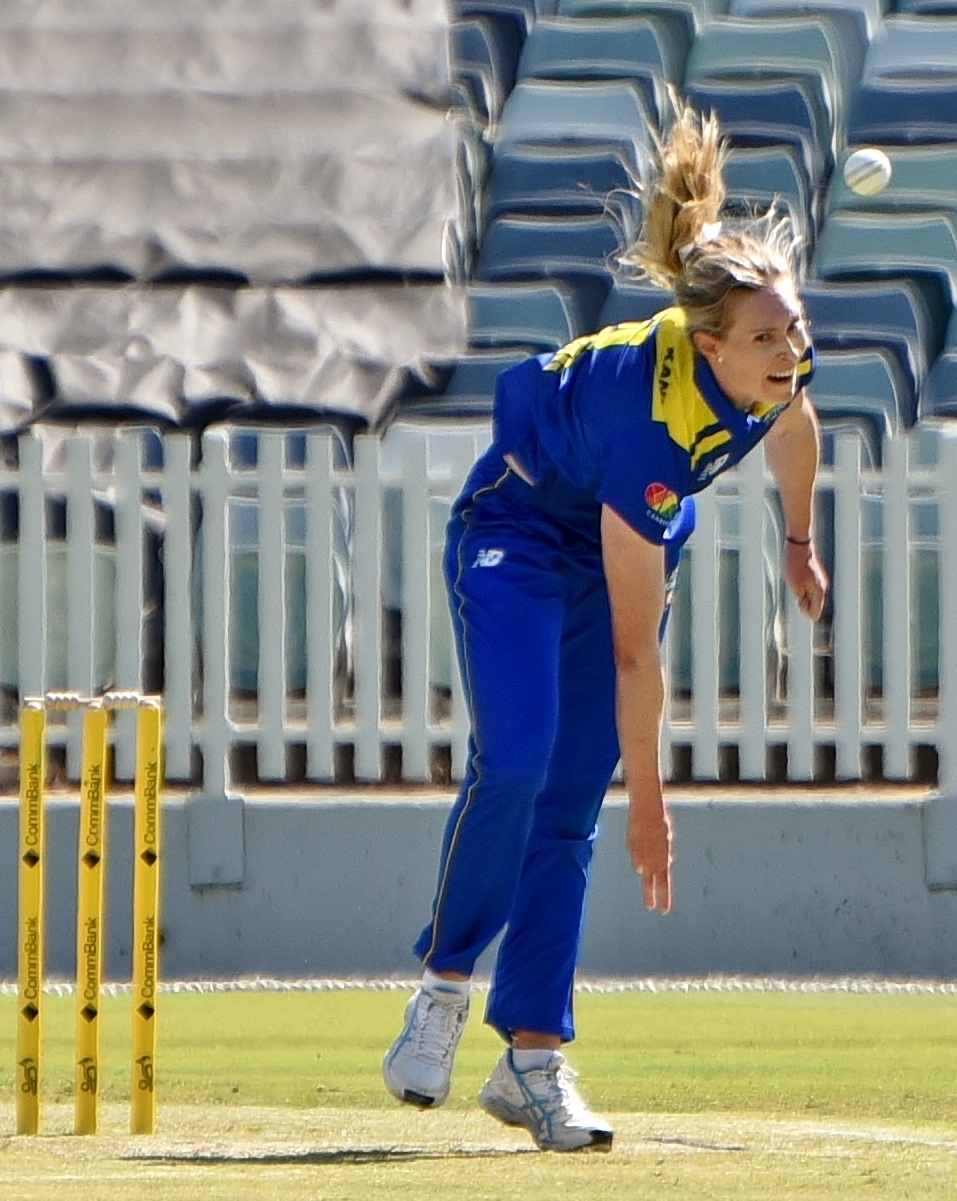
- Ferling bowling for ACT Meteors in September 2022

Personal information
- Full name: Holly Lee Ferling
- Born: 22 December 1995 (age 30); Kingaroy, Queensland, Australia
- Nickname: Bambi
- Height: 180 cm (5 ft 11 in)
- Batting: Right-handed
- Bowling: Right-arm fast-medium
- Role: Bowler
- Website: hollyferling.com

International information
- National side: Australia (2013–2016)
- Test debut (cap 163): 11 August 2013 v England
- Last Test: 11 August 2015 v England
- ODI debut (cap 125): 1 February 2013 v Pakistan
- Last ODI: 20 November 2016 v South Africa
- T20I debut (cap 37): 29 August 2013 v England
- Last T20I: 31 January 2016 v India

Domestic team information
- Years: Team
- 2012/13–2021/22: Queensland
- 2015/16: Northern Districts
- 2015/16–2017/18: Brisbane Heat
- 2018/19–2020/21: Melbourne Stars
- 2021/22: Melbourne Renegades
- 2022/23–present: Australian Capital Territory
- 2022/23: Perth Scorchers

Career statistics
| Competition | Test | ODI | T20I | LA |
|---|---|---|---|---|
| Matches | 3 | 22 | 9 | 110 |
| Runs scored | 5 | 9 | 0 | 384 |
| Batting average | – | 3.00 | 0.00 | 9.84 |
| 100s/50s | 0/0 | 0/0 | 0/0 | 0/0 |
| Top score | 5* | 4 | 0 | 47* |
| Balls bowled | 396 | 721 | 162 | 4,620 |
| Wickets | 3 | 24 | 5 | 110 |
| Bowling average | 64.33 | 22.00 | 28.40 | 30.71 |
| 5 wickets in innings | 0 | 0 | 0 | 0 |
| 10 wickets in match | 0 | 0 | 0 | 0 |
| Best bowling | 2/59 | 3/4 | 2/14 | 4/54 |
| Catches/stumpings | 0/– | 9/– | 0/– | 23/– |
- Source: Cricinfo, 6 August 2025

Holly Lee Ferling (born 22 December 1995) is an Australian professional cricketer who made her debut for the Australia national women's cricket team in 2013 and currently plays for Australian Capital Territory in Australia's domestic competitions. She is a right-arm fast-medium bowler and right-handed batter.

== Cricket ==
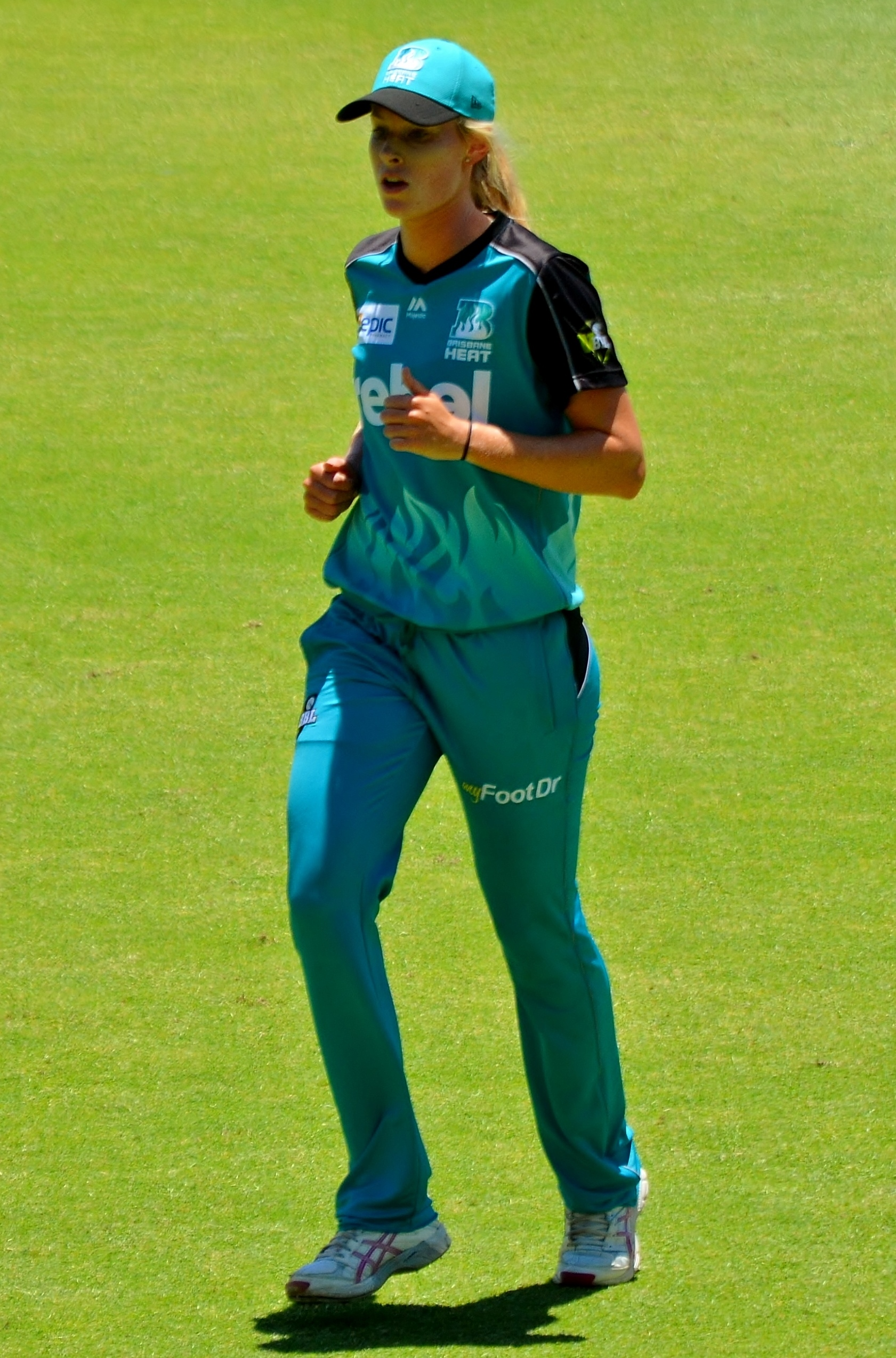
Ferling fielding for Brisbane Heat during WBBL–02

A right-arm fast-medium paced bowler, Ferling made four appearances during the 2013 Women's Cricket World Cup, taking nine wickets at an average of 10.55; placing her second on the bowling averages tables. She was named as the twelfth player in the team of the tournament, selected by an ICC panel.

At the age of 14, Ferling made her debut in men's grade cricket in Queensland, and took a hat-trick with her first three balls. She later became the first woman to be named as the Queensland Junior Cricketer of the Year. Ferling developed her game playing alongside men, something she feels has helped her to teach her where to bowl.

In June 2015, she was named as one of Australia's touring party for the 2015 Women's Ashes in England, after a period of injury.

In July 2015, Ferling was named as the first signing for the Brisbane Heat in the inaugural Women's Big Bash League. She also played for Northern Districts Spirit in New Zealand during the 2015–16 season.

Ferling was dropped from the Australian squad in November 2016, and subsequently required surgery on an elbow injury that ruled her out of contention for a recall ahead of the 2017 World Cup.

In November 2018, she was named in the Melbourne Stars' squad for the 2018–19 Women's Big Bash League season. In August 2021, she joined their local rivals, the Melbourne Renegades.

== Netball ==
Ferling was also an accomplished netball player. Predominantly known as a defensive player, she rose to represent the Wide Bay Thundercats in the Queensland State Netball League.

== Media work ==
Ferling presents a podcast on women in sport called Girls & Glory, launched in 2020.

In January 2021, Ferling was a guest presenter on Channel Seven's coverage of the Fourth Test between Australia and India at The Gabba, with the regular commentary team unable to be present on the ground due to the COVID-19 pandemic. Her performance attracted widespread praise from viewers.

== Personal life ==
Ferling's nickname is "Bambi". In 2015, she explained to The Saturday Paper: "It's because I fall over all the time."
