= Heather Graham (cricketer) =

Australian cricketer

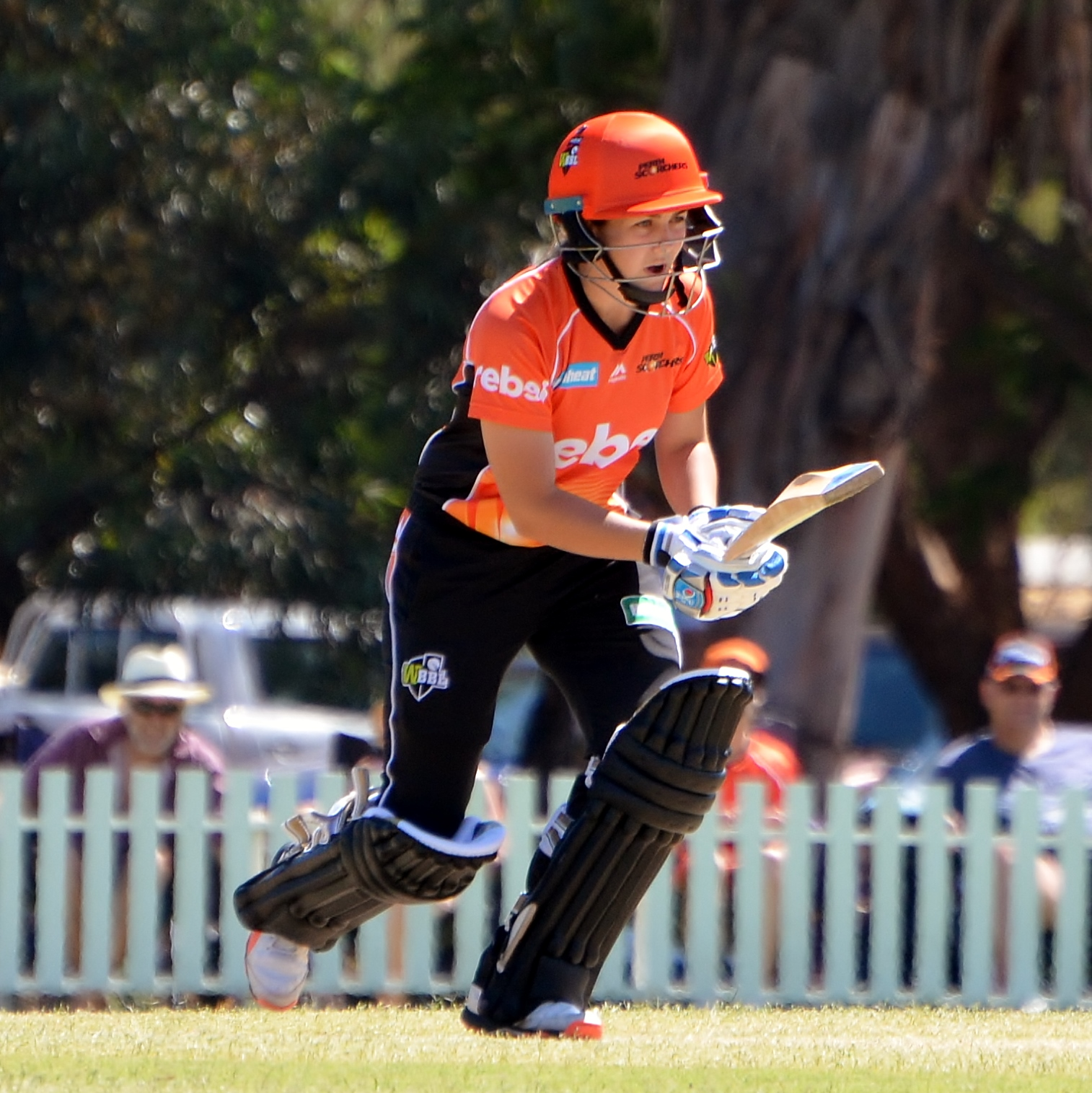
- Graham batting for Perth Scorchers during WBBL02.

Personal information
- Full name: Heather Louise Graham
- Born: 10 May 1996 (age 30); Subiaco, Western Australia
- Batting: Right-handed
- Bowling: Right-arm medium-fast
- Role: All-rounder

International information
- National side: Australia
- Only ODI (cap 142): 7 October 2019 v Sri Lanka
- T20I debut (cap 59): 11 December 2022 v India
- Last T20I: 19 September 2024 v New Zealand
- T20I shirt no.: 11

Domestic team information
- Years: Team
- 2011/12–2019/20: Western Australia
- 2014: Essex
- 2015/16–2021/22: Perth Scorchers
- 2020/21–2024/25: Tasmania
- 2021: Trent Rockets
- 2022–2023: Northern Superchargers
- 2022/23–present: Hobart Hurricanes
- 2023: Mumbai Indians
- 2024: The Blaze
- 2025/26-present: Western Australia

Career statistics
Competition	WODI	WLA	WT20
Matches	1	91	205
Runs scored	4	2,214	2,463
Batting average	–	26.05	18.35
100s/50s	0/0	4/14	0/4
Top score	4*	116	68
Balls bowled	48	3,110	2,971
Wickets	1	101	171
Bowling average	29.00	23.59	20.45
5 wickets in innings	0	2	0
10 wickets in match	0	0	0
Best bowling	1/29	6/39	4/8
Catches/stumpings	2/–	/–	35/–
- Source: CricketArchive, 31 December 2022

Heather Louise Graham (born 10 May 1996) is an Australian cricketer who plays for Western Australia and Hobart Hurricanes.

== Domestic career ==
In November 2018, she was named in the Perth Scorchers' squad for the 2018–19 Women's Big Bash League season. In April 2019, Cricket Australia awarded her with a contract with the National Performance Squad ahead of the 2019–20 season. In 2020, Graham moved to the Tasmanian Tigers so she could spend more time with her partner, all-rounder Emily Smith, who had moved to Tasmania in the previous season.

In 2021, she was drafted by Trent Rockets for the inaugural season of The Hundred. In November 2021, Graham reached 2 milestones in the Women's Big Bash League, during the same game against Sydney Sixers, she had scored 1000 runs and taken 100 wickets in her WBBL career.

== International career ==
In August 2019, Graham was named in Australia's squad for their series against the West Indies. The following month, Graham was again named in Australia's squad, this time for their series against Sri Lanka. She made her Women's One Day International (WODI) debut for Australia, against Sri Lanka, on 7 October 2019.

In January 2022, Graham was named in Australia's A squad for their series against England A, with the matches being played alongside the Women's Ashes. The following month, Graham was named as a reserve in Australia's team for the 2022 Women's Cricket World Cup in New Zealand, replacing Hannah Darlington. Graham was eventually added to Australia's squad for the World Cup as a temporary replacement for Ashleigh Gardner, after Gardner gave a positive test for COVID-19.

In July 2022, Graham was added to Australia's Women's Twenty20 International (WT20I) squad for the 2022 Ireland women's Tri-Nation Series.

Graham was drafted into the Australia squad during the 2024 ICC Women's T20 World Cup as a replacement for the injured Tayla Vlaeminck.
