= Maddy Darke =

Australian cricketer (born 2001)

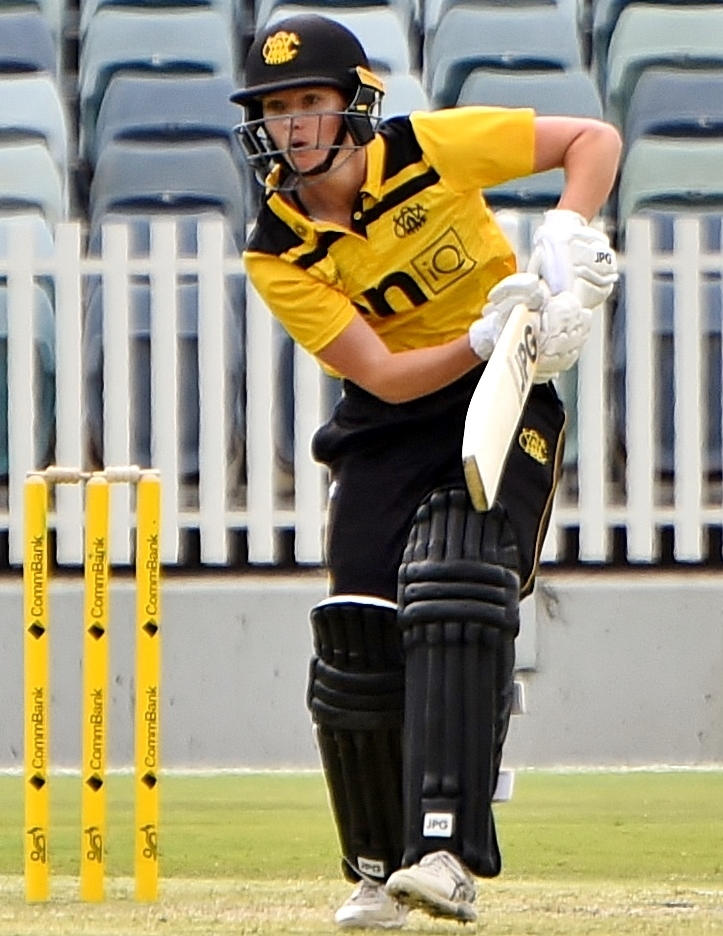
- Darke batting for WA in September 2022

Personal information
- Full name: Madeleine Darke
- Born: 30 March 2001 (age 25); Bondi, New South Wales, Australia
- Batting: Right-handed
- Bowling: Right-arm off break
- Role: Wicket-keeper

Domestic team information
- Years: Team
- 2019/20–2020/21: Sydney Sixers
- 2019/20–2020/21: New South Wales
- 2021/22: Melbourne Stars
- 2021/22–present: Western Australia
- 2022/23–present: Perth Scorchers

Career statistics
Competition	WLA	WT20
Matches	41	42
Runs scored	1,515	369
Batting average	43.28	14.19
100s/50s	2/11	0/0
Top score	133	45*
Catches/stumpings	43/8	9/–
- Source: CricketArchive, 28 January 2024

Madeleine Darke (born 30 March 2001) is an Australian cricketer who plays as a wicket-keeper and right-handed batter for Western Australia in the Women's National Cricket League (WNCL) and Perth Scorchers in the Women's Big Bash League (WBBL).

Darke previously played for Sydney Sixers, New South Wales and Melbourne Stars, and appeared for Australia A during their tour of England in 2023.

On 15 November 2020, in the WBBL match against the Adelaide Strikers, Darke replaced Ashleigh Gardner as a concussion substitute.
