= Chloe Piparo =

Australian-Italian cricketer (born 1994)

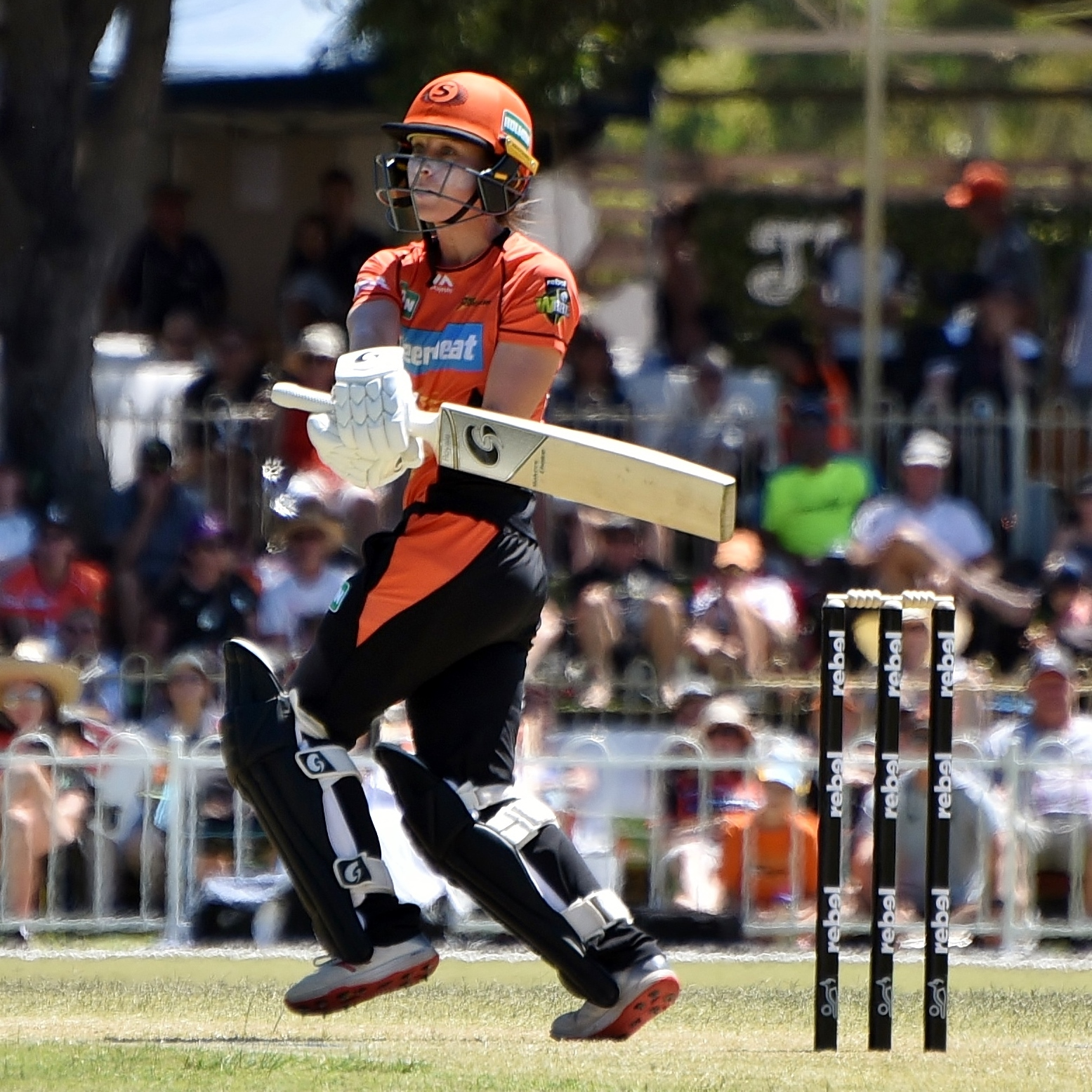
- Piparo batting for Perth Scorchers in December 2018

Personal information
- Full name: Chloe Lee Piparo
- Born: 5 September 1994 (age 32); Bunbury, Western Australia
- Batting: Right-handed
- Bowling: Right-arm off break
- Role: Batter

International information
- National side: Italy (2025–present)
- T20I debut (cap 30): 25 May 2025 v Jersey
- Last T20I: 29 May 2025 v Spain

Domestic team information
- Years: Team
- 2011/12–present: Western Australia
- 2015/16–present: Perth Scorchers (squad no. 28)
- 2016: Worcestershire

Career statistics
Competition	WLA	WT20	WT20I
Matches	98	154	5
Runs scored	2,150	1,229	133
Batting average	29.96	10.65	133.00
100s/50s	3/23	0/2	0/0
Top score	119	82*	74*
Balls bowled	-	-	6
Wickets	-	-	0
Bowling average	-	-	-
5 wickets in innings	-	-	0
10 wickets in match	-	-	0
Best bowling	-	-	-
Catches/stumpings	25/–	24/–	5/–
- Source: CricketArchive, 30 May 2025

Chloe Lee Piparo (born 5 September 1994) is an Australian-Italian cricketer who plays as a right-handed batter for Western Australia in the Women's National Cricket League (WNCL) and Perth Scorchers in the Women's Big Bash League (WBBL). She also plays for the Italian women's national team.

== Biography ==
A pint-sized, small framed and technically sound player, Piparo was raised in Bunbury, Western Australia. She attended the WACA's Regional Junior Program and South West Cricket Academy, and represented WA at Under-15 and Under-18 level. She also captained Australia's women's Under-18 team, for which she made a century against Papua New Guinea in September 2013.

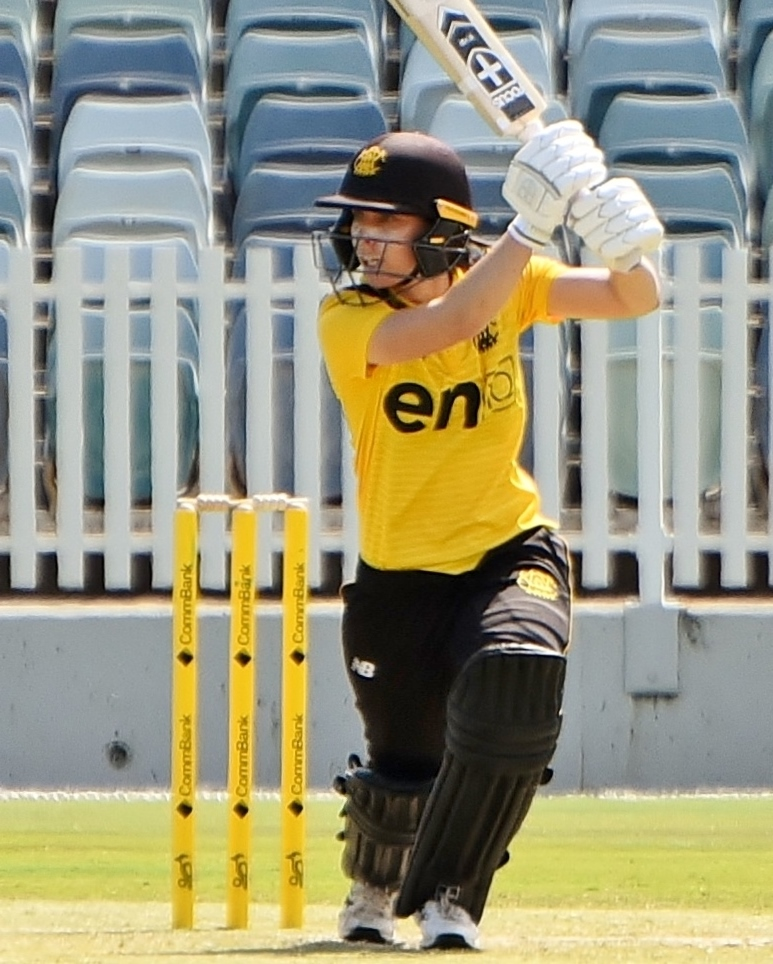
Piparo batting for Western Australia in September 2022

In 2011–12, Piparo made her WNCL debut for Western Australia. The following season, 2012–13, she scored 154 runs at an average of 25.66. In 2013–14, she performed solidly once again, with an average of 30.8 and a career highest score of 95no against Queensland Fire in Toowoomba.

Piparo was named in the Scorchers squad for the inaugural 2015–16 WBBL, and played in every Scorchers game that season. In February 2016, she was signed by Worcestershire as their overseas player for that year's English summer. During her fourth game for Worcestershire in June 2016, she scored a match-winning half-century against Essex.

In November 2016, Piparo stood in as skipper of Western Australia, and scored her maiden WNCL century, against Tasmania at the WACA Ground in Perth. However, her efforts were not enough to win the match. Later that season, she played in the Scorchers' WBBL|02 campaign (2016–17).

In August 2018, Piparo was appointed captain of Western Australia for the WNCL 2018–19 season. In November 2018, she was named in the Perth Scorchers' squad for the 2018–19 WBBL season.

Piparo considers Matthew Hayden to be her cricket role model, "... because he was everything I wasn’t! A left handed, big bodied, power hitter (something I can only ever dream of being!)" She also claims to be able to lick her elbow, which, she says, is supposed to be impossible.
