= Taneale Peschel =

Australian cricketer (born 1994)

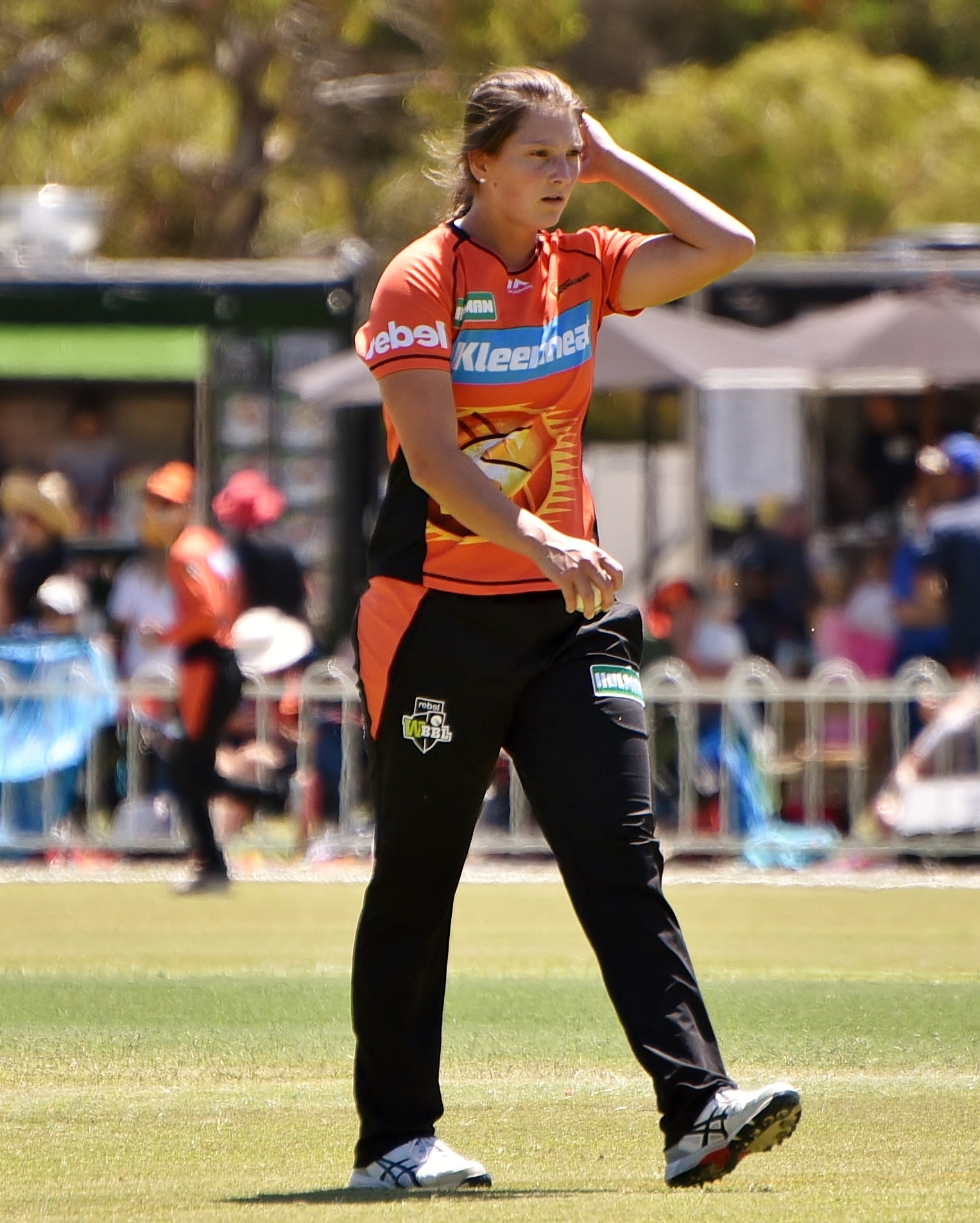
- Peschel during WBBL|04, 2018

Personal information
- Full name: Taneale Christy Jane Peschel
- Born: 29 August 1994 (age 32); Rockingham, Western Australia
- Batting: Right-handed
- Bowling: Right-arm medium
- Role: Bowler

Domestic team information
- Years: Team
- 2013/14: Western Australia
- 2016/17–present: Western Australia
- 2017/18–present: Perth Scorchers

Career statistics
Competition	WLA	WT20
Matches	60	81
Runs scored	396	78
Batting average	11.50	6.14
100s/50s	0/1	0/0
Top score	50*	12*
Balls bowled	1,697	1,338
Wickets	39	53
Bowling average	37.62	29.85
5 wickets in innings	0	0
10 wickets in match	0	0
Best bowling	4/37	3/13
Catches/stumpings	5/–	2/–
- Source: CricketArchive, 27 March 2021

Taneale Christy Jane Peschel (born 29 August 1994) is an Australian cricketer who plays as a right-arm medium pace bowler and right-handed batter for Western Australia in the Women's National Cricket League (WNCL) and the Perth Scorchers in the Women's Big Bash League (WBBL). She made her debut for Western Australia on 26 October 2013 against Queensland. After a period away, she returned to Western Australia ahead of the 2016–17 WNCL season, and made her maiden half-century in her second game back against South Australia. She made her WBBL debut for the Perth Scorchers in the 2017–18 WBBL season. Peschel has also represented Australia in indoor cricket.
