= 2017–18 Perth Scorchers WBBL season =

Australian women's cricket season

Perth Scorchers
2017–18 season
- Perth Scorchers 2017–18 cap logo
- Coach: Lisa Keightley
- Captain(s): Elyse Villani
- Home ground: WACA Ground
- League: WBBL
- Record: 8–6 (3rd)
- Finals: Runners-up
- Leading Run Scorer: Elyse Villani – 535
- Leading Wicket Taker: Katherine Brunt – 23
- Player of the Season: Katherine Brunt

The 2017–18 Perth Scorchers Women's season was the third in the team's history. Coached by Lisa Keightley and captained by Elyse Villani, the Scorchers ended the regular season of WBBL|03 in third place. They then defeated the Sydney Thunder by 27 runs in a semi-final at Optus Stadium to set up a re-match of the previous year's final against the Sydney Sixers. In the championship decider, held at Adelaide Oval, the Scorchers suffered a heavy nine-wicket loss to once again finish the tournament as runners-up.

== Squad ==
Each WBBL|03 squad featured 15 active players, with an allowance of up to five marquee signings including a maximum of three from overseas. Australian marquees were defined as players who made at least ten limited-overs appearances for the national team in the three years prior to the cut-off date (24 April 2017).

Personnel changes ahead of the season included:

- New Zealand marquee Suzie Bates departed the Scorchers, signing with the Adelaide Strikers.
- Meg Lanning signed with the Scorchers, departing the Melbourne Stars. However, due to a shoulder injury, Lanning would be unavailable for the entire season. New Zealand's Thamsyn Newton was subsequently signed as a marquee replacement player.
- Due to the departure of Bates (outgoing captain with a 9–7 win–loss record) and the unavailability of Lanning, Elyse Villani assumed the captaincy for the season.
- England marquee Nat Sciver signed with the Scorchers, departing the Melbourne Stars.
- Mikayla Hinkley signed with the Scorchers, departing the Sydney Thunder.

Changes made during the season included the signing of Taneale Peschel as a local replacement player. Peschel played two games in the absence of Katherine Brunt who was sidelined with a back injury.

The table below lists the Scorchers players and their key stats (including runs scored, batting strike rate, wickets taken, economy rate, catches and stumpings) for the season.

No.	Name	Nat.	Birth date	Batting style	Bowling style	G	R	SR	W	E	C	S	Notes
Batters
22	Lauren Ebsary	(Australia)	15 March 1983	Right-handed	Right-arm medium	16	159	116.05	–	–	6	–	
1	Mikayla Hinkley	(Australia)	1 May 1998	Right-handed	Right-arm medium	5	11	73.33	–	–	3	–	
7	Meg Lanning	(Australia)	25 March 1992	Right-handed	Right-arm medium	–	–	–	–	–	–	–	Australian marquee
28	Chloe Piparo	(Australia)	5 September 1994	Right-handed	Right-arm off spin	2	2	40.00	–	–	0	–	
39	Natalie Sciver	(England)	20 August 1992	Right-handed	Right-arm medium fast	16	339	118.53	4	7.78	13	–	Overseas marquee
3	Elyse Villani	(Australia)	6 October 1989	Right-handed	Right-arm medium	16	535	125.88	0	6.00	9	–	Captain, Australian marquee
All-rounders
12	Nicole Bolton	(Australia)	17 January 1989	Left-handed	Right-arm off spin	16	482	101.47	8	6.33	4	–	Australian marquee
5	Mathilda Carmichael	(Australia)	4 April 1994	Right-handed	Right-arm medium fast	6	40	95.23	–	–	2	–	
11	Heather Graham	(Australia)	5 October 1996	Right-handed	Right-arm medium	15	136	89.47	14	6.96	4	–	
	Ravina Oa	(Papua New Guinea)	24 April 1995	Right-handed	Right-arm medium	–	–	–	–	–	–	–	Associate rookie
Wicket-keepers
4	Megan Banting	(Australia)	11 February 1996	Right-handed	Right-arm medium	6	11	47.82	–	–	0	–	
33	Emily Smith	(Australia)	9 January 1995	Right-handed	Right-arm medium	16	0	0.00	–	–	2	3	
Bowlers
26	Katherine Brunt	(England)	2 July 1985	Right-handed	Right-arm fast	14	104	83.87	23	4.83	4	–	Overseas marquee
8	Piepa Cleary	(Australia)	17 July 1996	Right-handed	Right-arm medium fast	15	43	97.72	13	6.12	3	–	
16	Katie-Jane Hartshorn	(Australia)	20 June 1994	Right-handed	Left-arm wrist spin	1	–	–	0	9.75	0	–	
2	Emma King	(Australia)	25 March 1992	Right-handed	Right-arm off spin	16	9	64.28	15	6.00	2	–	
79	Thamsyn Newton	(New Zealand)	3 June 1995	Right-handed	Right-arm medium fast	14	50	96.15	6	9.43	1	–	Overseas marquee (replacement)
6	Taneale Peschel	(Australia)	29 August 1994	Right-handed	Right-arm medium fast	2	–	–	1	9.20	0	–	Local replacement

== Ladder ==
Pos	Team	Pld	W	L	NR	Pts	NRR
1	Sydney Sixers (C)	14	10	4	0	20	0.890
2	Sydney Thunder	14	10	4	0	20	0.684
3	Perth Scorchers (RU)	14	8	6	0	16	0.266
4	Adelaide Strikers	14	8	6	0	16	0.250
5	Brisbane Heat	14	7	7	0	14	0.147
6	Melbourne Renegades	14	6	8	0	12	0.092
7	Melbourne Stars	14	5	9	0	10	−0.634
8	Hobart Hurricanes	14	2	12	0	4	−1.733

- The top four teams qualified for the play-off phase.

== Fixtures ==
All times are local time

=== Regular season ===
Match 4
10 December 2017
10:45
Scorecard

Perth Scorchers; 6/188 (20 overs)	v	Brisbane Heat; 9/170 (20 overs)
Natalie Sciver 84 (46); Sammy-Jo Johnson 2/24 (4 overs)		Delissa Kimmince 87* (54); Katherine Brunt 3/23 (4 overs)

Perth Scorchers won by 18 runs
North Sydney Oval No. 2
Umpires: Ryan Nelson and David Shepard
Player of the match: Natalie Sciver (Scorchers)

- Perth Scorchers won the toss and elected to bat
- Broadcast by Network Ten

Match 7
12 December 2017
12:00
Scorecard

Sydney Sixers; 8/122 (20 overs)	v	Perth Scorchers; 1/123 (18.2 overs)
Erin Burns 33 (25); Katherine Brunt, Emma King 2/19 (4 overs)		Elyse Villani 74* (61); Sarah Aley 1/22 (4 overs)

Perth Scorchers won by 9 wickets (with 10 balls remaining)
North Dalton Park, Wollongong
Umpires: Ryan Nelson and Marc Nickl
Player of the match: Elyse Villani (Scorchers)

- Perth Scorchers won the toss and elected to field
- Streamed on cricket.com.au

Match 9
15 December 2017
14:00
Scorecard

Perth Scorchers; 7/112 (20 overs)	v	Brisbane Heat; 4/116 (18.5 overs)
Katherine Brunt 29 (32); Delissa Kimmince 2/17 (4 overs)		Kirby Short 50* (48); Katherine Brunt 2/17 (4 overs)

Brisbane Heat won by 6 wickets (with 7 balls remaining)
Allan Border Field, Brisbane
Umpires: Murray Branch and Steven Farrell
Player of the match: Deandra Dottin (Heat)

- Perth Scorchers won the toss and elected to bat
- Streamed on cricket.com.au

Match 17
26 December 2017
11:20
Scorecard

Melbourne Stars; 4/163 (20 overs)	v	Perth Scorchers; 1/164 (18.3 overs)
Lizelle Lee 76 (62); Emma King 2/24 (4 overs)		Elyse Villani 84* (53); Erin Osborne 1/24 (4 overs)

Perth Scorchers won by 9 wickets (with 9 balls remaining)
WACA Ground, Perth
Umpires: Ashlee Kovalevs and John Taylor
Player of the match: Nicole Bolton (Scorchers)

- Perth Scorchers won the toss and elected to field
- Streamed on cricket.com.au
- Double header with Match 7 of the Men's BBL

Match 18
27 December 2017
11:30
Scorecard

Melbourne Stars; 6/149 (20 overs)	v	Perth Scorchers; 4/137 (20 overs)
Georgia Elwiss 25 (24); Katherine Brunt 2/13 (3 overs)		Elyse Villani 72 (44); Alana King 1/11 (2 overs)

Melbourne Stars won by 12 runs
WACA Ground, Perth
Umpires: James Hewitt and John Taylor
Player of the match: Elyse Villani (Scorchers)

- Melbourne Stars won the toss and elected to bat
- Streamed on cricket.com.au

Match 20
30 December 2017
13:00
Scorecard

Sydney Sixers; 138 (19.5 overs)	v	Perth Scorchers; 4/139 (18.5 overs)
Ellyse Perry 45 (47); Nicole Bolton 2/15 (3 overs)		Elyse Villani 63 (43); Dane van Niekerk 2/24 (4 overs)

Perth Scorchers won by 6 wickets (with 7 balls remaining)
Lilac Hill, Perth
Umpires: John Taylor and Trent Steenholdt
Player of the match: Nicole Bolton (Scorchers)

- Sydney Sixers won the toss and elected to bat
- Streamed on cricket.com.au

Match 29
7 January 2018
10:00
Scorecard

Sydney Thunder; 6/145 (20 overs)	v	Perth Scorchers; 6/144 (20 overs)
Rachel Priest 42 (32); Piepa Cleary 3/19 (3 overs)		Nicole Bolton 71 (57); Rene Farrell 2/19 (4 overs)

Sydney Thunder won by 1 run
Lilac Hill, Perth
Umpires: A Kovalevs and Trent Steenholdt
Player of the match: Rene Farrell (Thunder)

- Sydney Thunder won the toss and elected to bat
- Streamed on cricket.com.au

Match 31
8 January 2018
13:30
Scorecard

Sydney Thunder; 4/134 (20 overs)	v	Perth Scorchers; 2/136 (18.1 overs)
Alex Blackwell 81* (58); Katherine Brunt 1/13 (4 overs)		Natalie Sciver 61* (50); Maisy Gibson 1/18 (4 overs)

Perth Scorchers won by 8 wickets (with 11 balls remaining)
WACA Ground, Perth
Umpires: James Hewitt and A Kovalevs
Player of the match: Alex Blackwell (Thunder)

- Perth Scorchers won the toss and elected to field
- Streamed on cricket.com.au

Match 34
13 January 2018
10:50
Scorecard

Perth Scorchers; 9/87 (16 overs)	v	Adelaide Strikers; 4/88 (15.5 overs)
Heather Graham 19 (17); Tahlia McGrath 3/17 (3 overs)		Suzie Bates 49* (47); Katherine Brunt 2/17 (4 overs)

Adelaide Strikers won by 6 wickets (with 1 ball remaining)
Traeger Park, Alice Springs
Umpires: Darren Close and Craig Thomas
Player of the match: Tahlia McGrath (Strikers)

- Adelaide Strikers won the toss and elected to field
- Match reduced to 16 overs per side due to rain delay
- Broadcast by Network Ten

Match 38
14 January 2018
16:30 (D/N)
Scorecard

Adelaide Strikers; 7/107 (20 overs)	v	Perth Scorchers; 76 (17.3 overs)
Tahlia McGrath 34 (28); Katherine Brunt 2/15 (4 overs)		Nicole Bolton 30 (38); Alex Price 2/4 (1.3 overs)

Adelaide Strikers won by 31 runs
Traeger Park, Alice Springs
Umpires: Craig Thomas and Ben Treloar
Player of the match: Tahlia McGrath (Strikers)

- Perth Scorchers won the toss and elected to field
- Streamed on cricket.com.au

Match 44
20 January 2018
13:30
Scorecard

Hobart Hurricanes; 4/122 (20 overs)	v	Perth Scorchers; 1/126 (16 overs)
Isobel Joyce 52* (47); Piepa Cleary 2/11 (3 overs)		Elyse Villani 70* (48); Nicola Hancock 1/25 (4 overs)

Perth Scorchers won by 9 wickets (with 24 balls remaining)
WACA Ground, Perth
Umpires: J Paterson and Trent Steenholdt
Player of the match: Elyse Villani (Scorchers)

- Perth Scorchers won the toss and elected to field
- Streamed on cricket.com.au

Match 45
21 January 2018
14:00
Scorecard

Hobart Hurricanes; 7/130 (20 overs)	v	Perth Scorchers; 4/134 (18.5 overs)
Georgia Redmayne 53 (49); Thamsyn Newton 1/7 (1 over)		Nicole Bolton 60* (61); Katelyn Fryett 2/20 (4 overs)

Perth Scorchers won by 6 wickets (with 7 balls remaining)
Lilac Hill Park, Perth
Umpires: James Hewitt and J Paterson
Player of the match: Nicole Bolton (Scorchers)

- Perth Scorchers won the toss and elected to field
- Streamed on cricket.com.au

Match 51
27 January 2018
14:00
Scorecard

Perth Scorchers; 7/124 (20 overs)	v	Melbourne Renegades; 6/125 (19.2 overs)
Lauren Ebsary 61* (44); Maitlan Brown 2/18 (4 overs)		Sophie Molineux 62 (45); Emma King 2/14 (3 overs)

Melbourne Renegades won by 4 wickets (with 4 balls remaining)
Camberwell Sports Ground, Melbourne
Umpires: Andrew Crozier and Dale Ireland
Player of the match: Sophie Molineux (Renegades)

- Melbourne Renegades won the toss and elected to field
- Streamed on cricket.com.au

Match 54
28 January 2018
14:00
Scorecard

Melbourne Renegades; 9/112 (20 overs)	v	Perth Scorchers; 6/113 (16.1 overs)
Emma Inglis 28 (19); Katherine Brunt 3/11 (4 overs)		Natalie Sciver 39* (33); Georgia Wareham 3/19 (4 overs)

Perth Scorchers won by 4 wickets (with 23 balls remaining)
Camberwell Sports Ground, Melbourne
Umpires: Daryl Brigham and Andrew Crozier
Player of the match: Katherine Brunt (Scorchers)

- Perth Scorchers won the toss and elected to field
- Streamed on cricket.com.au
- Former Australian player Kris Britt made her last WBBL appearance

=== Knockout phase ===
Semi-final 1
1 February 2018
12:10
Scorecard

Perth Scorchers; 2/148 (20 overs)	v	Sydney Thunder; 8/121 (20 overs)
Natalie Sciver 38 (28); Stafanie Taylor 1/23 (4 overs)		Fran Wilson 46 (28); Emma King 3/17 (4 overs)

Perth Scorchers won by 27 runs
Optus Stadium, Perth
Umpires: Geoff Joshua and Tony Wilds
Player of the match: Emma King (Scorchers)

- Sydney Thunder won the toss and elected to field
- Played as a double header with BBL semi-final 1
- Broadcast by Network Ten

Final
4 February 2018
11:50
Scorecard

Perth Scorchers; 99 (20 overs)	v	Sydney Sixers; 1/100 (15 overs)
Piepa Cleary 18* (14); Sarah Coyte 4/17 (3 overs)		Alyssa Healy 41 (32); Emma King 1/26

Sydney Sixers won by 9 wickets (with 30 balls remaining)
Adelaide Oval, Adelaide
Umpires: Greg Davidson and John Ward
Player of the match: Sarah Coyte (Sixers)

- Perth Scorchers won the toss and elected to bat
- Sydney Sixers won their second WBBL title
- Played as a double header with BBL final
- Broadcast by Network Ten

== Statistics and awards ==
- Most runs: Elyse Villani – 535 (2nd in the league)
- Highest score in an innings: Elyse Villani – 84* (53) vs Melbourne Stars, 26 December 2017
- Most wickets: Katherine Brunt – 23 (equal 1st in the league)
- Best bowling figures in an innings: Katherine Brunt – 3/11 (4 overs) vs Melbourne Renegades, 28 January 2018
- Most catches (fielder): Nat Sciver – 13 (1st in the league)
- Player of the Match awards:
  - Nicole Bolton, Elyse Villani – 3 each
  - Katherine Brunt, Emma King, Nat Sciver – 1 each
- Scorchers Player of the Year: Katherine Brunt
- WBBL|03 Player of the Tournament: Elyse Villani (2nd)
- WBBL|03 Team of the Tournament: Nicole Bolton, Katherine Brunt, Elyse Villani
