= 2016–17 Perth Scorchers WBBL season =

Perth Scorchers
2016–17 season
- Coach: (Australia) Lisa Keightley
- Captain(s): (New Zealand) Suzie Bates
- Home ground: WACA Ground, Lilac Hill Park
- WBBL Season: 2nd
- WBBL Finals: 2nd

The 2016–17 Perth Scorchers WBBL season was the second in the team's history. Coached by Lisa Keightley and captained by Suzie Bates, the team competed in the WBBL|02 competition.

At the conclusion of the group stage, the Scorchers team was second on the table. The Scorchers then defeated the Brisbane Heat in a semi-final, but lost to the Sydney Sixers in the final, to emerge as the WBBL|02 runners-up.

== Squad ==
The following is the Scorchers women squad for WBBL|02. Players with international caps are listed in bold.

No.	Name	Nat.	Birth date	Batting style	Bowling style	Notes
Batsmen
12	**Nicole Bolton**	(Australia)	17 January 1989 (age 37)	Left-handed	Right arm off spin	
22	**Lauren Ebsary**	(Australia)	15 March 1983 (age 43)	Right-handed	Right-arm medium	
11	Heather Graham	(Australia)	5 October 1996 (age 29)	Right-handed	Right arm medium fast	
28	Chloe Piparo	(Australia)	5 September 1994 (age 31)	Right-handed	Right arm off spin	
3	**Elyse Villani**	(Australia)	6 October 1989 (age 36)	Right-handed	Right arm fast medium	
All-rounders
10	**Suzie Bates**	(New Zealand)	16 September 1987 (age 38)	Right-handed	Right arm medium	Captain / Overseas international
5	Mathilda Carmichael	(Australia)	4 April 1994 (age 32)	Right-handed	Right arm fast medium	
	**Emma Lai**	(Hong Kong)	14 March 1988 (age 38)	Right-handed	Right arm medium	Associate Rookie
Wicketkeepers
4	Megan Banting	(Australia)	11 February 1996 (age 30)	Right-handed	Right arm medium	
33	Emily Smith	(Australia)	9 January 1995 (age 31)	Right-handed	Right arm medium	
Pace bowlers
20	Emma Biss	(Australia)	31 May 1990 (age 36)	Right-handed	Right arm medium	
26	**Katherine Brunt**	(England)	2 July 1985 (age 41)	Right-handed	Right arm medium fast	Overseas international
8	Piepa Cleary	(Australia)	17 July 1996 (age 30)	Right-handed	Right arm medium	
16	Katie-Jane Hartshorn	(Australia)	20 June 1994 (age 32)	Right-handed	Slow left-arm wrist-spin	
41	**Anya Shrubsole**	(England)	7 December 1991 (age 34)	Right-handed	Right arm medium	Overseas international / fifth game onwards
Spin bowlers
14	**Rebecca Grundy**	(England)	12 July 1990 (age 36)	Left-handed	Left-arm orthodox spin	Overseas international / first four games
2	Emma King	(Australia)	25 March 1992 (age 34)	Right-handed	Right arm off spin	

== Ladder ==
Pos	Team	Pld	W	L	NR	Ded	Pts	NRR
1	Sydney Sixers (C)	14	9	5	0	0	18	0.442
2	Perth Scorchers (RU)	14	8	6	0	0	16	0.300
3	Brisbane Heat	14	8	6	0	0	16	0.046
4	Hobart Hurricanes	14	7	6	1	0	15	−0.034
5	Melbourne Stars	14	7	7	0	0	14	0.256
6	Sydney Thunder	14	6	7	1	0	13	−0.046
7	Melbourne Renegades	14	6	8	0	0.5	11.5	−0.519
8	Adelaide Strikers	14	3	9	2	0	8	−0.541

- The top four teams qualified for the play-off phase.

== Fixtures ==
=== Group stage ===
Match 1
10 December
10:00
Scorecard

Hobart Hurricanes; 5/120 (19 overs)	v	Perth Scorchers; 6/119 (20 overs)
Hayley Matthews 48 (38); Suzie Bates 2/14 (3 overs)		Katherine Brunt 41 (24); Heather Knight 2/31 (4 overs)

Hobart Hurricanes won by 5 wickets (with 6 balls remaining)
North Sydney Oval No. 2
Umpires: Glen Stubbings and Marc Nickl
Player of the match: Hayley Matthews (Hurricanes)

- Hobart Hurricanes won the toss and elected to field
- Streamed on cricket.com.au

Match 5
11 December
10:45
Scorecard

Perth Scorchers; 4/142 (20 overs)	v	Hobart Hurricanes; 9/125 (20 overs)
Elyse Villani 54 (45); Hayley Matthews 2/19 (4 overs)		Veronica Pyke 27* (15); Katherine Brunt 2/18 (4 overs)

Perth Scorchers won by 17 runs
North Sydney Oval
Umpires: Donovan Koch and Simon Lightbody
Player of the match: Elyse Villani (Scorchers)

- Perth Scorchers won the toss and elected to bat
- Streamed on cricket.com.au; broadcast by Network Ten

Match 10
17 December
10:00
Scorecard

Brisbane Heat; 9/101 (20 overs)	v	Perth Scorchers; 2/102 (17.1 overs)
Smriti Mandhana 21 (25); Emma King 2/10 (4 overs)		Nicole Bolton 46* (43); Deandra Dottin 1/18 (4 overs)

Perth Scorchers won by 8 wickets (with 17 balls remaining)
WACA Ground, Perth
Umpires: Hennie Botes and John Taylor
Player of the match: Nicole Bolton

- Perth Scorchers won the toss and elected to field
- Streamed on cricket.com.au

Match 16
18 December
10:00
Scorecard

Perth Scorchers; 9/94 (20 overs)	v	Brisbane Heat; 2/95 (12.5 overs)
Elyse Villani 19 (23); Jemma Barsby 2/12 (4 overs)		Beth Mooney 67* (46); Emma King 2/30 (4 overs)

Brisbane Heat won by 8 wickets (with 43 balls remaining)
WACA Ground, Perth
Umpires: Trent Steenholdt and John Taylor
Player of the match: Beth Mooney

- Brisbane Heat won the toss and elected to field
- Streamed on cricket.com.au

Match 25
29 December
14:35
Scorecard

Melbourne Renegades; 7/123 (20 overs)	v	Perth Scorchers; 5/155 (20 overs)
Sophie Molineux 37 (37); Emma King 2/25 (4 overs)		Elyse Villani 60 (43); Molly Strano 2/25 (4 overs)

Perth Scorchers won by 32 runs
Etihad Stadium, Melbourne
Umpires: Daryl Brigham and Dale Ireland
Player of the match: Elyse Villani (Scorchers)

- Melbourne Renegades won the toss and elected to field
- Melbourne Renegades were penalised 0.5 points for slow over rate
- Double header with BBL game
- Streamed on cricket.com.au

Match 26
31 December
12:45
Scorecard

Adelaide Strikers; 9/82 (20 overs)	v	Perth Scorchers; 4/85 (15.5 overs)
Tahlia McGrath 27 (31); Heather Graham 2/12 (3 overs)		Nicole Bolton 28 (32); Megan Schutt 2/16 (3 overs)

Perth Scorchers won by 6 wickets (with 25 balls remaining)
Adelaide Oval
Umpires: Simon Lightbody and Luke Uthenwoldt
Player of the match: Katherine Brunt (Scorchers)

- Adelaide Strikers won the toss and elected to bat
- Double header with BBL game
- Streamed on cricket.com.au; broadcast by Network Ten

Match 32
4 January
13:00
Scorecard

Perth Scorchers; 7/131 (20 overs)	v	Melbourne Renegades; 5/132 (18.1 overs)
Heather Graham 30 (25); Molly Strano 2/18 (4 overs)		Danielle Wyatt 43 (42); Emma King 2/30 (4 overs)

Melbourne Renegades won by 5 wickets (with 11 balls remaining)
Camberwell Sports Ground, Melbourne
Umpires: Daryl Brigham and Stephen Brne
Player of the match: Grace Harris (Renegades)

- Perth Scorchers won the toss and elected to bat
- Streamed on cricket.com.au

Match 33
5 January
13:00
Scorecard

Perth Scorchers; 1/118 (16.1 overs)	v	Melbourne Stars; 6/117 (20 overs)
Elyse Villani 57 (44); Morna Nielsen 1/20 (3 overs)		Meg Lanning 30 (27); Emma King 1/19 (4 overs)

Perth Scorchers won by 9 wickets (with 23 balls remaining)
Toorak Park, Melbourne
Umpires: Dale Ireland and David Shepherd
Player of the match: Elyse Villani (Scorchers)

- Perth Scorchers won the toss and elected to field
- Streamed on cricket.com.au

Match 37
8 January
14:30
Scorecard

Perth Scorchers; 6/120 (20 overs)	v	Sydney Sixers; 6/132 (20 overs)
Suzie Bates 52 (53); Lauren Smith 2/23 (4 overs)		Ashleigh Gardner 40 (23); Anya Shrubsole 2/20 (4 overs)

Sydney Sixers won by 12 runs
Hurstville Oval, Sydney
Umpires: T Pennman and Tony Wilds
Player of the match: Ashleigh Gardner (Sixers)

- Sydney Sixers won the toss and elected to bat
- Streamed on cricket.com.au

Match 38
9 January
14:30
Scorecard

Sydney Sixers; 6/133 (19.3 overs)	v	Perth Scorchers; 9/129 (20 overs)
Alyssa Healy 46 (31); Katherine Brunt 2/25 (4 overs)		Lauren Ebsary 37 (28); Lauren Smith 4/23 (4 overs)

Sydney Sixers won by 4 wickets (with 3 balls remaining)
Sydney Cricket Ground
Umpires: G Stubbings and Ben Treloar
Player of the match: Alyssa Healy (Sixers)

- Perth Scorchers won the toss and elected to bat
- Double header with BBL game
- Streamed on cricket.com.au

Match 45
14 January
13:35
Scorecard

Perth Scorchers; 3/122 (18 overs)	v	Adelaide Strikers; 6/120 (20 overs)
Heather Graham 39*(30); Tahlia McGrath 1/17 (4 overs)		Charlotte Edwards 31 (23); Piepa Cleary 3/21 (4 overs)

Perth Scorchers won by 7 wickets (with 12 balls remaining)
WACA Ground, Perth
Umpires: Nathan Johnstone and Trent Steenholdt
Player of the match: Heather Graham

- Perth Scorchers won the toss and elected to field
- Double header with BBL game
- Streamed by cricket.com.au

Match 47
15 January
10:00
Scorecard

Melbourne Stars; 9/97 (20 overs)	v	Perth Scorchers; 4/130 (20 overs)
Natalie Sciver 31 (32); Anya Shrubsole 2/9 (3 overs)		Lauren Ebsary 45* (53); Emma Kearney 1/11 (4 overs)

Perth Scorchers won by 33 runs
Lilac Hill, Perth
Umpires: Hennie Botes and Nathan Johnstone
Player of the match: Katherine Brunt (Scorchers)

- Melbourne Stars won the toss and elected to field
- Streamed by cricket.com.au

Match 50
20 January
14:00
Scorecard

Perth Scorchers; 5/149 (20 overs)	v	Sydney Thunder; 6/145 (20 overs)
Elyse Villani 74 (55); Nicola Carey 2/15 (2 overs)		Harmanpreet Kaur 64* (37); Piepa Cleary 3/16 (4 overs)

Perth Scorchers won by 4 runs
Lilac Hill, Perth
Umpires: James Hewitt and Todd Rann
Player of the match: Elyse Villani (Scorchers)

- Sydney Thunder won the toss and elected to field
- Streamed by cricket.com.au

Match 56
21 January
14:00
Scorecard

Sydney Thunder; 5/134 (19.1 overs)	v	Perth Scorchers; 4/131 (20 overs)
Stafanie Taylor 62 (54); Elyse Villani 3/16 (2.1 overs)		Nicole Bolton 53 (43); Nicola Carey 2/30 (4 overs)

Sydney Thunder won by 5 wickets (with 5 balls remaining)
Lilac Hill, Perth
Umpires: James Hewitt and A Kovalevs
Player of the match: Stafanie Taylor (Thunder)

- Perth Scorchers won the toss and elected to bat
- Streamed by cricket.com.au

=== Knockout phase ===
==== Semi-final ====
24 January
11:40
Scorecard

Perth Scorchers; 1/125 (15.4 overs)	v	Brisbane Heat; 5/124 (20 overs)
Kirby Short 39 (49); Emma King 2/17 (4 overs)		Elyse Villani 52 (48)

Perth Scorchers won by 9 wickets (with 26 balls remaining)
WACA Ground, Perth
Umpires: Michael Graham-Smith and Damien Mealey
Player of the match: Emma King (Scorchers)

- Perth Scorchers won the toss and elected to field
- Was played as a double header prior to Semi Final 1 of the Men's BBL. Both matches were broadcast on Network Ten

==== Final ====
28 January
10:45
Scorecard

Perth Scorchers; 7/117 (20 overs)	v	Sydney Sixers; 5/124 (20 overs)
Katherine Brunt 35* (30); Sarah Aley 4/23 (4 overs)		Alyssa Healy 40 (27); Anya Shrubsole 2/17 (4 overs)

Sydney Sixers won by 7 runs
WACA Ground, Perth
Umpires: Shawn Craig and Greg Davidson
Player of the match: Sarah Aley (Sixers)

- Perth Scorchers won the toss and elected to field
- Sydney Sixers won their first WBBL title
