= 2018–19 Women's National Cricket League season =

Cricket tournament

Women's National Cricket League 2018–19 season
- Dates: 21 September 2018 – 9 February 2019
- Administrator: Cricket Australia
- Cricket format: Limited overs cricket (50 overs)
- Tournament format(s): Round-robin and final
- Champions: New South Wales (20th title)
- Runners-up: Queensland
- Participants: 7
- Matches: 22
- Player of the series: (Tasmania) Georgia Redmayne
- Most runs: (Western Australia) Heather Graham (294)
- Most wickets: (New South Wales) Rene Farrell (17)
- Official website: cricket.com.au

The 2018–19 Women's National Cricket League season was the 23rd season of the Women's National Cricket League, the women's domestic limited overs cricket competition in Australia. The tournament started on 21 September 2018 and finished on 9 February 2019. Defending champions New South Wales Breakers won the tournament for the 20th time after topping the ladder and beating Queensland Fire in the final.

== Ladder ==
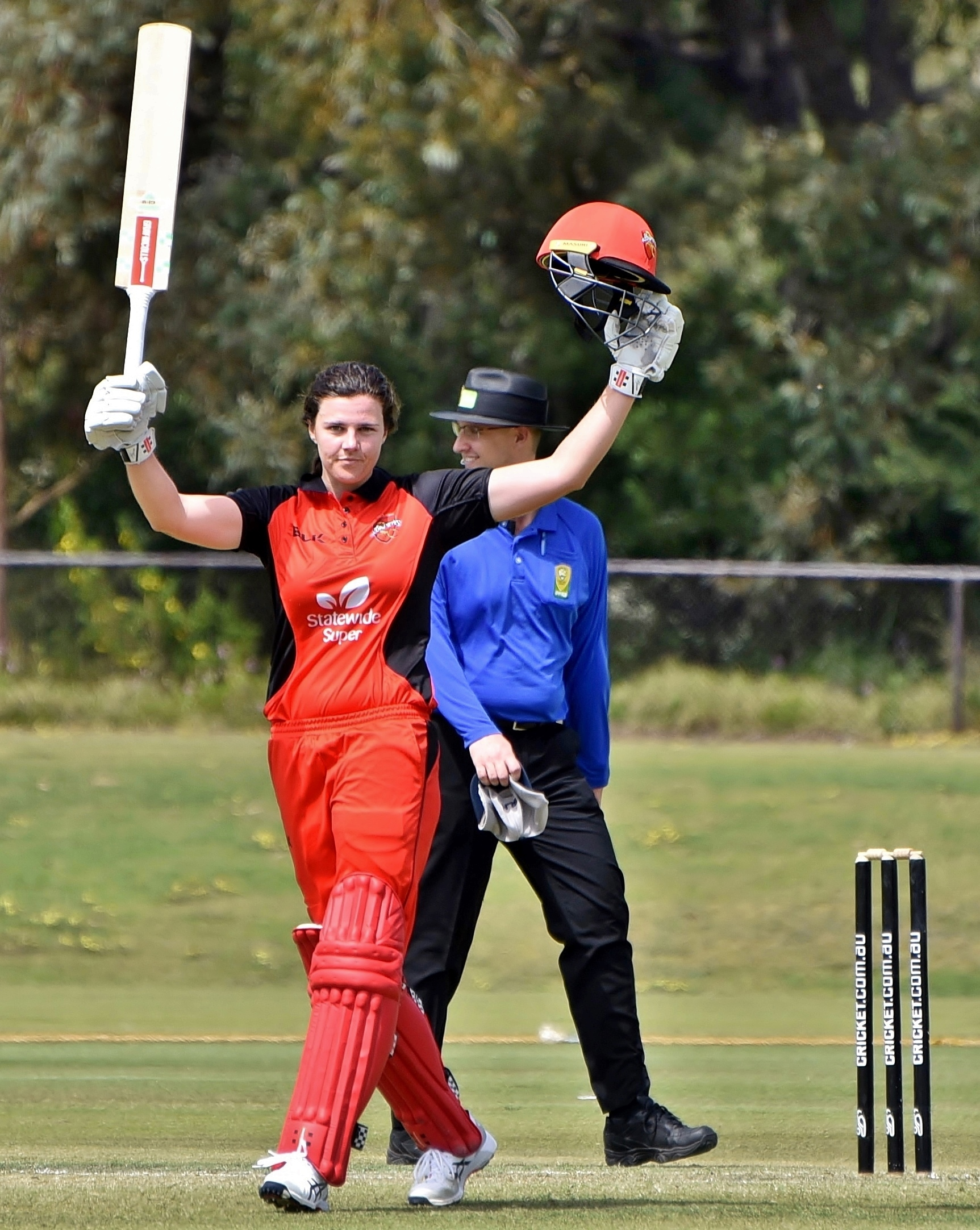
McGrath 109

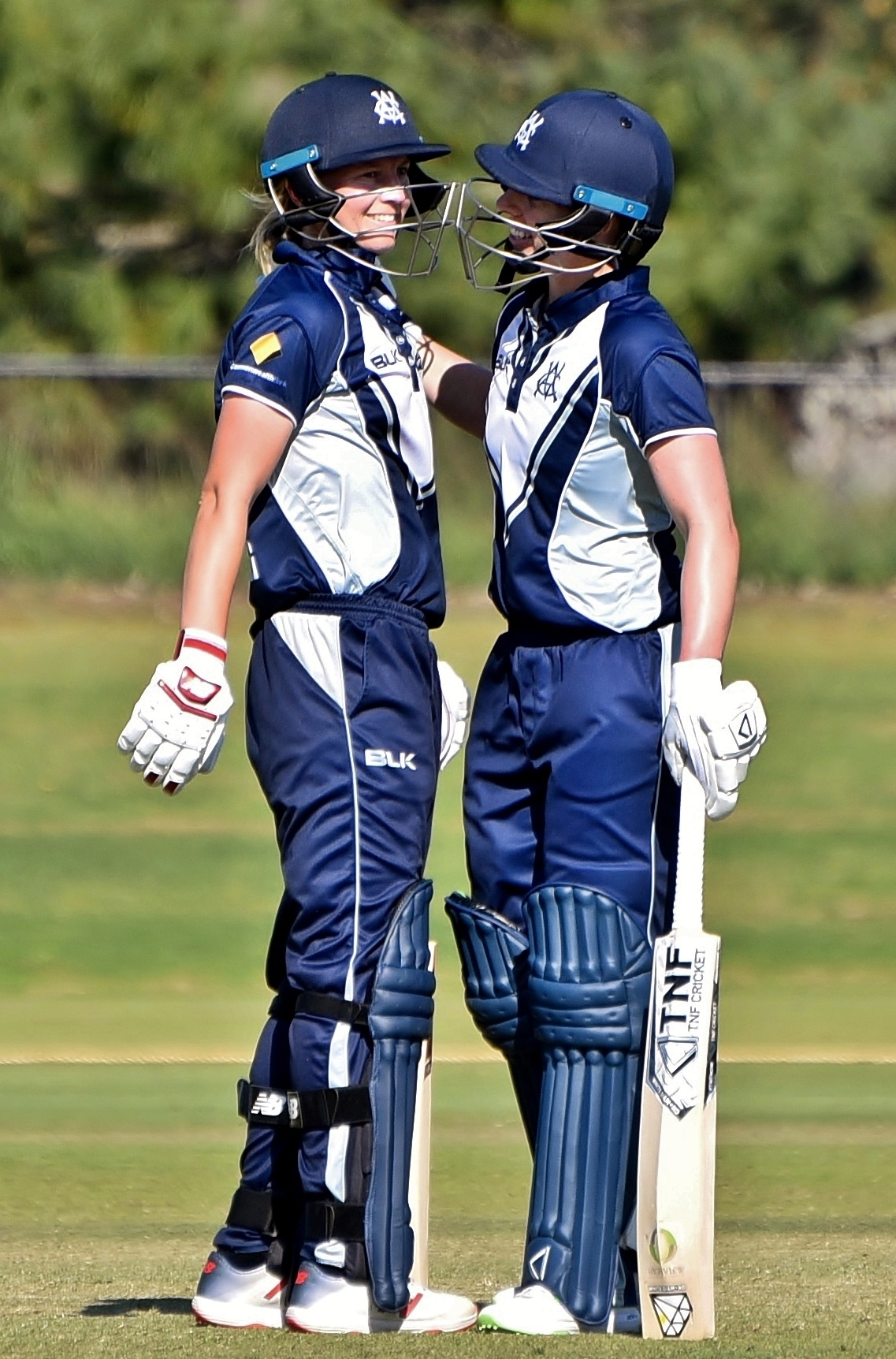
Lanning 120*

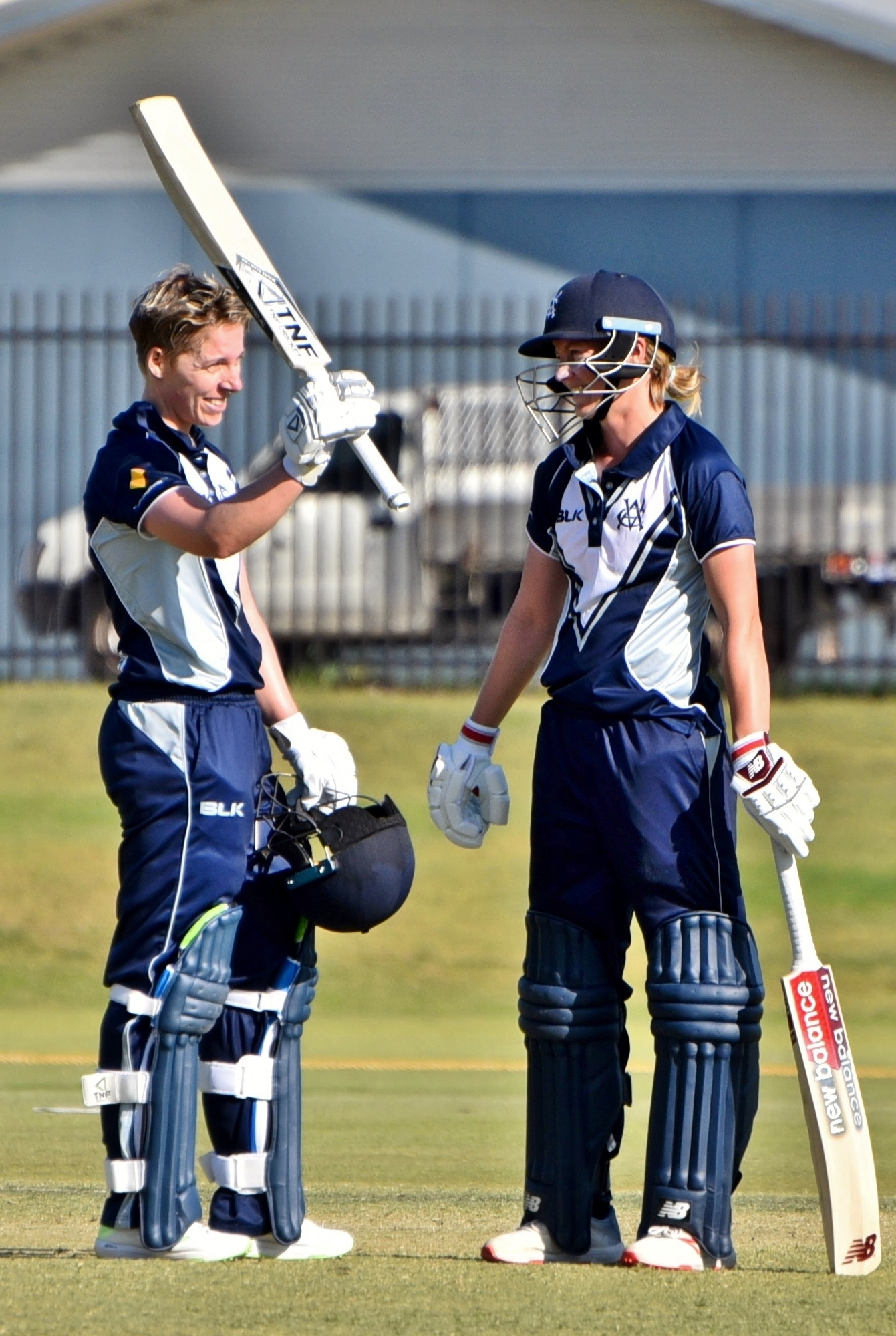
Villani 106

Three centuries were scored during the Victoria v South Australia match in round 1.

As of 3 February 2019

Pos	Team	Pld	W	L	T	NR	BP	Pts	NRR
1	New South Wales	6	4	2	0	0	6	22	1.455
2	Queensland	6	4	2	0	0	3	19	1.083
3	Tasmania	6	4	2	0	0	2	18	−0.139
4	Australian Capital Territory	6	3	3	0	0	0	12	−0.199
5	Victoria	6	2	4	0	0	1	9	−0.403
6	Western Australia	6	2	4	0	0	0	8	−0.811
7	South Australia	6	2	4	0	0	0	8	−1.005

Updated to match(es) played on 3 February 2019. Source:
Rules for classification: The top two ranked teams qualified for the final.
- Points system: 4 for a win, 2 each for a tie or a no result, 0 for a loss, 1 each for an abandoned match.
- Bonus point system: 2 for win with a run rate twice that of the opposition, 1 for win with a run rate 1.25 times that of the opposition.

== Fixtures ==
=== Round 1 ===
Match 1
21 September 2018
09:30
Scorecard

New South Wales; 149 (36 overs)	v	Queensland (home team); 9/150 (40.1 overs)
Alyssa Healy 24 (23); Jemma Barsby 3/6 (6 overs)		Sammy-Jo Johnson 67 (90); Rene Farrell 6/17 (9 overs)

Queensland won by 1 wicket (with 59 balls remaining)
Bill Pippen Oval, Gold Coast
Umpires: David Taylor and N James
Player of the match: Sammy-Jo Johnson (Queensland)

- New South Wales won the toss and elected to bat.
- Points: Queensland 4, New South Wales 0

Match 2
21 September 2018
09:30
Scorecard

Australian Capital Territory; 218 (46.4 overs)	v	Tasmania; 5/222 (46 overs)
Katie Mack 57 (80); Meg Phillips 3/37 (8.4 overs)		Corinne Hall 86 (98); Maitlan Brown 2/30 (8 overs)

Tasmania won by 5 wickets (with 24 balls remaining)
Allan Border Field, Brisbane
Umpires: Stephen Dionysius and S Farrell
Player of the match: Corinne Hall (Tasmania)

- Australian Capital Territory won the toss and elected to bat.
- Points: Tasmania 4, ACT 0

Match 3
21 September 2018
09:30
Scorecard

(home team) Western Australia; 270 (49 overs)	v	Victoria; 224 (47.1 overs)
Heather Graham 60 (71); Georgia Wareham 3/46 (9 overs)		Sophie Molineux 73 (96); Taneale Peschel 3/38 (8 overs)

Western Australia won by 56 runs
Murdoch University, Perth
Umpires: James Hewitt and J Paterson
Player of the match: Heather Graham (Western Australia)

- Victoria won the toss and elected to field.
- Points: Western Australia 4, Victoria 0

Match 4
22 September 2018
09:30
Scorecard

South Australia; 6/251 (50 overs)	v	Victoria; 3/252 (38.5 overs)
Tahlia McGrath 105 (116); Makinley Blows 2/38 (7 overs)		Meg Lanning 120* (108); Ellie Falconer 1/31 (3 overs)

Victoria won by 7 wickets (with 67 balls remaining)
Murdoch University, Perth
Umpires: A Kovalevs and Trent Steenholdt
Player of the match: Meg Lanning (Victoria)

- Victoria won the toss and elected to field.
- Points: Victoria 5, South Australia 0

Match 5
23 September 2018
09:30

New South Wales; 5/344 (50 overs)	v	Tasmania; 158 (39 overs)
Rachael Haynes 89 (86); Veronica Pyke 2/59 (10 overs)		Amy Satterthwaite 39 (70); Ellyse Perry 3/25 (8 overs)

New South Wales won by 186 runs
Bill Pippen Oval, Gold Coast
Umpires: N James and S Farrell
Player of the match: Ellyse Perry (New South Wales)

- New South Wales won the toss and elected to bat.
- Points: New South Wales 6, Tasmania 0

Match 6
23 September 2018
09:30
Scorecard

(home team) Queensland; 218 (46.4 overs)	v	Australian Capital Territory; 5/222 (46 overs)
Beth Mooney 47 (50); Erin Osborne 3/21 (10 overs)		Katie Mack 46 (75); Haidee Birkett 2/25 (8 overs)

ACT won by 4 wickets (with 26 balls remaining)
Allan Border Field, Brisbane
Umpires: Stephen Dionysius and David Taylor
Player of the match: Erin Osborne (ACT)

- Queensland won the toss and elected to bat.
- Points: ACT 4, Queensland 0

Match 7
23 September 2018
09:30
Scorecard

South Australia; 8/254 (50 overs)	v	Western Australia (home team); 205 (45.4 overs)
Bridget Patterson 109 (131); Emma King 4/48 (10 overs)		Heather Graham 70 (102); Amanda-Jade Wellington 3/43 (10 overs)

South Australia won by 49 runs
Murdoch University, Perth
Umpires: J Hewitt and Dean Trigg
Player of the match: Bridget Patterson (South Australia)

- Western Australia won the toss and elected to field.
- Points: South Australia 4, Western Australia 0

=== Round 2 ===
Match 8
9 November 2018
10:00
Scorecard

(home team) Tasmania; 6/247 (50 overs)	v	Queensland; 237 (49.2 overs)
Stefanie Daffara 75 (86); Haidee Birkett 2/48 (10 overs)		Kirby Short 83* (126); Alex Hartley 2/28 (10 overs)

Tasmania won by 10 runs
TCA Ground, Hobart
Umpires: Muhammad Qureshi and G Beechey
Player of the match: Meg Phillips (Tasmania)

- Tasmania won the toss and elected to bat.
- Points: Tasmania 4, Queensland 0.

Match 9
9 November 2018
10:00
Scorecard

Western Australia; 213 (46.2 overs)	v	New South Wales (home team); 9/181 (50 overs)
Heather Graham 101 (119); Rene Farrell 3/22 (8 overs)		Rene Farrell 45* (69); Heather Graham 3/14 (10 overs)

Western Australia won by 32 runs
Blacktown International Sportspark, Sydney
Umpires: Andrew Hamilton and Marc Nickl
Player of the match: Heather Graham (Western Australia)

- New South Wales won the toss and elected to field.
- Points: Western Australia 4, New South Wales 0.

Match 10
9 November 2018
14:30
Scorecard

(home team) Australian Capital Territory; 5/277 (50 overs)	v	Victoria; 229 (49.2 overs)
Erin Osborne 106 (124); Rhiann O'Donnell 2/49 (8 overs)		Makinley Blows 50 (62); Samantha Bates 2/34 (10 overs)

Australian Capital Territory won by 48 runs
Manuka Oval, Canberra
Umpires: Andrew Scotford and Andrew Crozier
Player of the match: Erin Osborne (Australian Capital Territory)

- Victoria won the toss and elected to field.
- Points: Australian Capital Territory 4, Victoria 0.

Match 11
10 November 2018
10:00
Scorecard

South Australia; 157 (48 overs)	v	Tasmania (home team); 4/158 (39.2 overs)
Tegan McPharlin 37 (48); Brooke Hepburn 2/25 (8 overs)		Georgia Redmayne 56 (96); Tahlia McGrath 1/15 (10 overs)

Tasmania won by 6 wickets (with 64 balls remaining)
TCA Ground, Hobart
Umpires: Muhammad Qureshi and Harvey Wulff
Player of the match: Georgia Redmayne (Tasmania)

- Tasmania won the toss and elected to field.
- Points: Tasmania 5, South Australia 0.

Match 12
11 November 2018
10:00
Scorecard

(home team) Australian Capital Territory; 253 (50 overs)	v	Western Australia; 220 (48.4 overs)
Claire Koski 82 (105); Heather Graham 3/42 (10 overs)		Bhavi Devchand 57 (74); Erin Burns 5/36 (10 overs)

Australian Capital Territory won by 33 runs
Manuka Oval, Canberra
Umpires: Andrew Scotford and D Young
Player of the match: Erin Burns (Australian Capital Territory)

- Australian Capital Territory won the toss and elected to bat.
- Points: Australian Capital Territory 4, Western Australia 0.

Match 13
11 November 2018
10:00
Scorecard

(home team) New South Wales; 8/190 (50 overs)	v	Victoria; 119 (40 overs)
Lisa Griffith 44 (82); Alana King 4/45 (10 overs)		Makinley Blows 34 (67); Maisy Gibson 4/28 (10 overs)

New South Wales won by 71 runs
Blacktown International Sportspark, Sydney
Umpires: Andrew Hamilton and Marc Nickl
Player of the match: Maisy Gibson (New South Wales)

- Victoria won the toss and elected to field.
- Points: New South Wales 5, Victoria 0.

Match 14
11 November 2018
10:00
Scorecard

Queensland; 326 (50 overs)	v	South Australia; 8/203 (50 overs)
Grace Harris 162 (114); Samantha Betts 5/69 (10 overs)		Eliza Doddridge 54* (85); Grace Harris 5/18 (10 overs)

Queensland won by 123 runs
TCA Ground, Hobart
Umpires: Wade Stewart and Darren Close
Player of the match: Grace Harris (Queensland)

- Queensland won the toss and elected to bat.
- Points: Queensland 5, South Australia 0.

=== Round 3 ===
Match 15
1 February 2019
10:00
Scorecard

(home team) South Australia; 106 (29 overs)	v	New South Wales; 4/107 (18.1 overs)
Annie O'Neill 30 (46); Ashleigh Gardner 2/15 (4 overs)		Rachael Haynes 37 (39); Megan Schutt 2/26 (6 overs)

New South Wales won by 6 wickets
Karen Rolton Oval, Adelaide
Umpires: E. Sheridan & C. Thomas
Player of the match: Kirby Short (Queensland)

- New South Wales won the toss and elected to field.
- Points: New South Wales 6, South Australia 0.

Match 16
1 February 2019
10:00
Scorecard

(home team) Victoria; 7/196 (50 overs)	v	Queensland; 9/197 (46 overs)
Molly Strano 44* (57); Jess Jonassen 2/16 (10 overs)		Kirby Short 45 (50); Alana King 3/42 (10 overs)

Queensland won by 1 wicket
Junction Oval, St Kilda
Umpires: M. van Eck and D. Brigham
Player of the match: Kirby Short (Queensland)

- Queensland won the toss and elected to field.
- Points: Queensland 4, Victoria 0.

Match 17
1 February 2019
10:00
Scorecard

Tasmania; 9/242 (50 overs)	v	Western Australia; 164 (44.1 overs)
Georgia Redmayne 77 (98); Kath Hempenstall 3/39 (7 overs)		Amy Edgar 67 (112); Alex Hartley 3/27 (10 overs)

Tasmania won by 78 runs
Casey Fields, Cranbourne East
Umpires: G. Azzopardi and D. Ireland
Player of the match: Georgia Redmayne (Tasmania)

- Western Australia won the toss and elected to field.
- Points: Tasmania 5, Western Australia 0.

Match 18
2 February 2019
10:00
Scorecard

Australian Capital Territory; 195 (42.4 overs)	v	New South Wales; 5/196 (30.3 overs)
Angela Reakes 61 (67); Lauren Cheatle 4/42 (10 overs)		Alyssa Healy 60 (46); Erin Burns 2/31 (6 overs)

New South Wales won by 5 wickets
Karen Rolton Oval, Adelaide
Umpires: E. Sheridan and C. Thomas
Player of the match: Lauren Cheatle (NSW)

- ACT won the toss and elected to bat.
- Points: New South Wales 5, ACT 0.

Match 19
3 February 2019
9:00
Scorecard

Western Australia; 100 (37.5 overs)	v	Queensland; 2/101 (16.0 overs)
Bhavi Devchand 33 (42); Jemma Barsby 4/11 (8 overs)		Beth Mooney 44* (49); Emma King 1/23 (5 overs)

Queensland won by 8 wickets
Casey Fields, Cranbourne East
Umpires: M. van Eck and D. Ireland
Player of the match: Jemma Barsby (Queensland)

- Queensland won the toss and elected to field.
- Points: Queensland 6, Western Australia 0.

Match 20
3 February 2019
10:00
Scorecard

(home team) Victoria; 7/260 (50 overs)	v	Tasmania; 246 (50 overs)
Meg Lanning 105 (101); Sasha Maloney 2/31 (8 overs)		Veronica Pyke 53 (45); Alana King 2/39 (9 overs)

Victoria won by 14 runs
Junction Oval, St Kilda
Umpires: G. Azzopardi and D. Brigham
Player of the match: Meg Lanning (Victoria)

- Victoria won the toss and elected to bat.
- Points: Victoria 4, Tasmania 0

Match 21
3 February 2019
9:30
Scorecard

South Australia; 245 (49.4 overs)	v	Australian Capital Territory; 198 (43.1 overs)
Bridget Patterson 113 (134); Hayley Jensen 4/45 (10 overs)		Claire Koski 55 (58); Amanda Wellington 4/35 (10 overs)

South Australia won by 47 runs
Karen Rolton Oval, Adelaide
Umpires: H. Singh and C. Thomas
Player of the match: Bridget Patterson (SA)

- South Australia won the toss and elected to bat.
- Points: South Australia 4, ACT 0

== Final ==
Final
9 February 2019
10:00
Scorecard

(home team) New South Wales; 7/259 (50 overs)	v	Queensland; 228 (47.2 overs)
Rachael Haynes 79 (105); Haidee Birkett 2/19 (5 overs)		Delissa Kimmince 44 (41); Nicola Carey 3/39 (8.2 overs)

New South Wales won by 31 runs
North Sydney Oval, North Sydney
Umpires: Nathan Johnstone and Darren Close
Player of the match: Nicola Carey (NSW)

- Queensland won the toss and elected to field.
- New South Wales won the 2018–19 Women's National Cricket League.

== Statistics ==
=== Highest totals ===
Team	Score	Against	Venue	Date
New South Wales	5/344	Tasmania	Bill Pippen Oval	23 September 2018
Queensland	326	South Australia	TCA Ground	11 November 2018
Australian Capital Territory	5/277	Victoria	Manuka Oval	9 November 2018
Western Australia	270	Victoria	Murdoch University	21 September 2018
Victoria	7/260	Tasmania	Junction Oval	3 February 2019

=== Most runs ===
Player	Team	Mat	Inns	NO	Runs	HS	Ave	BF	SR	100	50
Heather Graham	Western Australia	6	6	0	294	101	49.00	389	75.57	1	3
Meg Lanning	Victoria	4	4	1	290	120*	96.66	286	101.39	2	0
Claire Koski	Australian Capital Territory	6	6	0	276	82	46.00	312	88.46	0	3
Georgia Redmayne	Tasmania	6	6	0	275	77	45.83	442	62.21	0	3
Bridget Patterson	South Australia	6	6	0	262	113	43.66	351	74.64	2	0

=== Most wickets ===
Player	Team	Mat	Inns	Overs	Mdns	Runs	Wkts	BBI	Ave	SR	4WI
Rene Farrell	New South Wales	7	7	56.0	5	197	17	6/17	11.58	19.7	1
Emma King	Western Australia	6	6	55.0	2	218	12	4/48	18.16	27.5	1
Heather Graham	Western Australia	6	6	52.0	7	220	11	3/14	20.00	28.3	0
Erin Burns	Australian Capital Territory	6	6	42.2	3	192	10	5/36	19.20	25.4	1
Amanda-Jade Wellington	South Australia	6	6	42.1	1	193	10	4/35	19.30	25.3	1
