= 2016–17 Women's Big Bash League season =

2016–17 Women's Big Bash League
- Logo of the 2016–17 Women's Big Bash League season
- Dates: 10 December 2016 – 28 January 2017
- Administrator: Cricket Australia
- Cricket format: Twenty20
- Tournament format(s): Double round-robin and knockout finals
- Champions: Sydney Sixers (1st title)
- Participants: 8
- Matches: 59
- Attendance: 121,000 (2,051 per match)
- Player of the series: Beth Mooney (BRH)
- Most runs: Meg Lanning (MLS) – 502
- Most wickets: Sarah Aley (SYS) – 28

The 2016–17 Women's Big Bash League season or WBBL|02 was the second season of the Women's Big Bash League (WBBL), the semi-professional women's Twenty20 domestic cricket competition in Australia. The tournament ran from 10 December 2016 to 28 January 2017.

The Sydney Sixers finished the round-robin stage of the tournament in first place and, despite a late-season injury to captain Ellyse Perry, went on to claim their maiden championship. In the final, held at the WACA, Sydney defeated the Perth Scorchers by seven runs in a "veritable classic". Sixers medium-pace bowler Sarah Aley was named Player of the Final, managing figures of 4/23 in the decider and also clinching the title of WBBL|02 leading wicket-taker.

Brisbane Heat wicket-keeper Beth Mooney was named Player of the Tournament, while Melbourne Stars captain Meg Lanning topped the leading run-scorer table for the second-straight season.

== Teams ==
Each squad featured 15 active players, with an allowance of up to five marquee signings including a maximum of three from overseas. Australian marquees were defined as players who made at least ten limited-overs appearances for the national team between 1 July 2013 and 1 July 2016.

The table below lists each team's marquee players and other key details for the season.

Team	Home ground (Note: Number of games hosted at each venue is indicated in brackets)	Secondary grounds	Coach	Captain	Australian representatives (Note: Only includes players who debuted for Australia before the tournament)	Overseas marquee players (Note: New Zealander Hayley Jensen was classed as a local player for the Melbourne Stars in WBBL|02 due to her permanent residence in Australia and a lack of recent international cricket appearances.)
Adelaide Strikers	Adelaide Oval (3)	Gliderol Stadium (2)	Andrea McCauley	Tegan McPharlin	Sarah Coyte; Megan Schutt; Sarah Elliott (Note: Did not qualify as a marquee player); Tahlia McGrath; Shelley Nitschke; Amanda-Jade Wellington	Tammy Beaumont; Sophie Devine; Charlotte Edwards
Brisbane Heat	Allan Border Field (4)	The Gabba (2)	Andy Richards	Delissa Kimmince (Note: Kirby Short assumed the captaincy during the season.)	Holly Ferling; Jess Jonassen; Beth Mooney; Delissa Kimmince	Deandra Dottin; Smriti Mandhana; Lauren Winfield (Note: Replacement player)
Hobart Hurricanes	Blundstone Arena (5)	UTAS Stadium (1)	Julia Price	Heather Knight	Julie Hunter	Heather Knight; Hayley Matthews; Amy Satterthwaite; Isobel Joyce
Melbourne Renegades	Etihad Stadium (2)	Camberwell Sports Ground (2); Queen Elizabeth Oval (2)	Lachlan Stevens	Rachel Priest	Grace Harris; Kris Britt	Rachel Priest; Lea Tahuhu; Danielle Wyatt
Melbourne Stars	Melbourne Cricket Ground (2)	Casey Fields (2); Toorak Park (1)	David Hemp	Meg Lanning (Note: Kristen Beams stood in as acting captain for one game.)	Kristen Beams; Jess Cameron; Meg Lanning	Morna Nielsen; Nat Sciver; Danielle Hazell
Perth Scorchers	WACA Ground (5)	Lilac Hill Park (3)	Lisa Keightley	Suzie Bates	Nicole Bolton; Elyse Villani; Lauren Ebsary	Suzie Bates; Katherine Brunt; Anya Shrubsole; Rebecca Grundy
Sydney Sixers	North Sydney Oval (4)	Hurstville Oval (2); Sydney Cricket Ground (2); Drummoyne Oval (1)	Ben Sawyer	Ellyse Perry (Note: Alyssa Healy stood in as acting captain for three games.)	Alyssa Healy; Ellyse Perry; Lisa Sthalekar	Marizanne Kapp; Sara McGlashan; Dane van Niekerk; Amy Jones
Sydney Thunder	Blacktown ISP Oval (4)	Howell Oval (2); Lavington Sports Ground (1); North Sydney Oval (1); Spotless Stadium (1)	Joanne Broadbent	Alex Blackwell	Alex Blackwell; Rene Farrell; Erin Osborne; Lauren Cheatle; Rachael Haynes; Naomi Stalenberg	Harmanpreet Kaur; Stafanie Taylor

=== Personnel changes ===
==== Local players ====
The table below lists local player movements made ahead of the season.

Player	Departed	→	Joined	Notes	Ref
Lauren Ebsary	Adelaide Strikers	→	Perth Scorchers	Outgoing captain (6–8 win–loss record)	
Sarah Elliott	Melbourne Renegades	→	Adelaide Strikers	Outgoing captain (3–7 win–loss record)	
Kara Sutherland	Sydney Sixers	→	Brisbane Heat		
Ashleigh Barty	Brisbane Heat	→	–	Retired	
Jodie Fields	Brisbane Heat	→	–	Retired	
Grace Harris	Brisbane Heat	→	Melbourne Renegades	Australian marquee	
Megan White	Brisbane Heat	→	–	Retired	
Emily Smith	Hobart Hurricanes	→	Perth Scorchers		
Jess Duffin	–	→	Melbourne Stars	Australian marquee; Withdrew from the Perth Scorchers ahead of WBBL|01	
Hayley Jensen	–	→	Melbourne Stars	Overseas marquee replacement player in WBBL|01; Returning to the Melbourne Stars as a local player	
Nicky Shaw	Perth Scorchers	→	–	Retired	
Jenny Wallace	Perth Scorchers	→	–	Retired	

==== Overseas players ====
The table below lists changes to overseas marquee allocations made ahead of the season.

Player	Departed	→	Joined	Notes	Ref(s)
Charlotte Edwards	Perth Scorchers	→	Adelaide Strikers		
Sarah Taylor	Adelaide Strikers	→	–		
Tammy Beaumont	–	→	Adelaide Strikers		
Stacy-Ann King	Adelaide Strikers	→	–		
Smriti Mandhana	–	→	Brisbane Heat		
Deandra Dottin	Perth Scorchers	→	Brisbane Heat	Replacement player in WBBL|01	
Lauren Winfield	Brisbane Heat	→	–	Returned to the Brisbane Heat as a replacement player during the season	
Kate Cross	Brisbane Heat	→	–		
Lea Tahuhu	–	→	Melbourne Renegades		
Shabnim Ismail	Melbourne Renegades	→	–	Replacement player in WBBL|01	
Dane van Niekerk	Melbourne Renegades	→	Sydney Sixers		
Mignon du Preez	Melbourne Stars	→	–		
Hayley Jensen	Melbourne Stars	→	–	Replacement player in WBBL|01; Returning to the Melbourne Stars as a local player	
Anya Shrubsole	–	→	Perth Scorchers		
Laura Marsh	Sydney Sixers	→	–		
Harmanpreet Kaur	–	→	Sydney Thunder		

Changes made during the season included:

- England marquee Lauren Winfield returned to the Brisbane Heat as a replacement player.
- Ireland marquee Isobel Joyce signed with the Hobart Hurricanes as a replacement player.
- England marquee Danielle Hazell signed with the Melbourne Stars as a replacement player.
- England marquee Rebecca Grundy signed with the Perth Scorchers as a replacement player.
- England marquee Amy Jones signed with the Sydney Sixers as a replacement player.

==== Leadership ====
Captaincy changes made ahead of the season included:

- Tegan McPharlin was appointed captain of the Adelaide Strikers, replacing Lauren Ebsary (6–8 win–loss record).
- Rachel Priest was appointed captain of the Melbourne Renegades, replacing Sarah Elliott (3–7 win–loss record).
- Suzie Bates was appointed captain of the Perth Scorchers, replacing Nicole Bolton (7–8 win–loss record).

Captaincy changes made during the season included:

- Kirby Short assumed the captaincy of the Brisbane Heat, replacing Delissa Kimmince (11–11 win–loss record).
- Kristen Beams stood in as acting captain of the Melbourne Stars for one game, replacing Meg Lanning who was sidelined with a hamstring injury.

== Standings ==
=== Points table ===
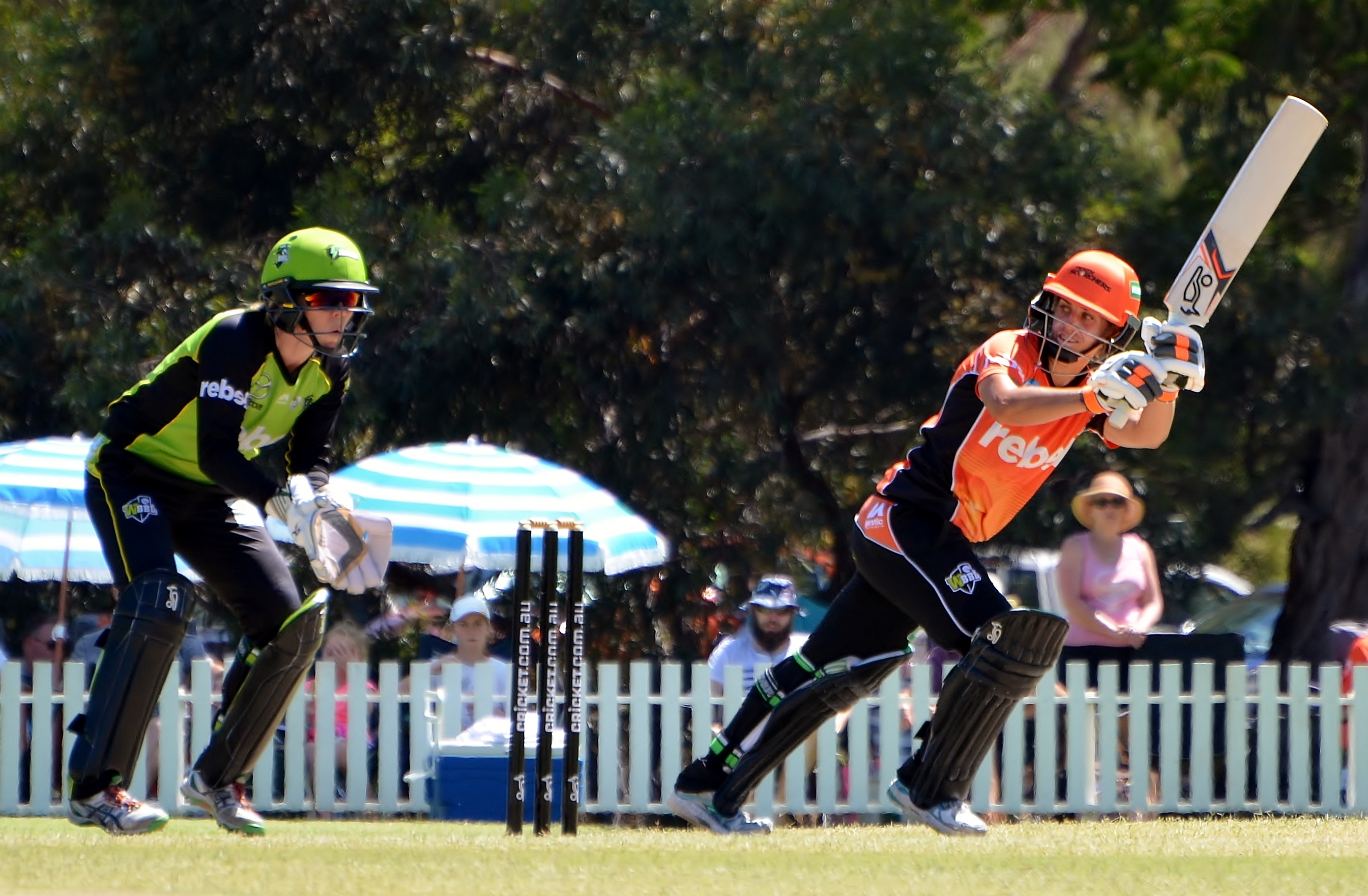
Nicole Bolton on her way to top scoring with 53 for Perth Scorchers against Sydney Thunder at Lilac Hill Park, Perth, on 21 January 2017. The wicketkeeper is Alex Blackwell.

Pos	Team	Pld	W	L	NR	Ded	Pts	NRR
1	Sydney Sixers (C)	14	9	5	0	0	18	0.442
2	Perth Scorchers (RU)	14	8	6	0	0	16	0.300
3	Brisbane Heat	14	8	6	0	0	16	0.046
4	Hobart Hurricanes	14	7	6	1	0	15	−0.034
5	Melbourne Stars	14	7	7	0	0	14	0.256
6	Sydney Thunder	14	6	7	1	0	13	−0.046
7	Melbourne Renegades	14	6	8	0	0.5	11.5	−0.519
8	Adelaide Strikers	14	3	9	2	0	8	−0.541

- The top four teams qualified for the play-off phase.

=== Win–loss table ===
Below is a summary of results for each team's fourteen regular season matches, plus finals where applicable, in chronological order. A team's opponent for any given match is listed above the margin of victory/defeat.

Team	1	2	3	4	5	6	7	8	9	10	11	12	13	14	SF	F	Pos.
Adelaide Strikers (ADS)	MLR; 14 runs	MLR; 7 wkts	SYT; N/R	SYT; 6 wkts	HBH; 7 wkts	HBH; N/R	PRS; 6 wkts	SYS; 19 runs	SYS; 4 wkts	MLS; 6 wkts	MLS; 37 runs	PRS; 7 wkts	BRH; 9 wkts	BRH; S/O	X	X	8th
Brisbane Heat (BRH)	SYS; 5 wkts	SYS; 8 wkts	PRS; 8 wkts	PRS; 8 wkts	MLS; 54 runs	MLS; 5 runs	SYT; 3 runs	SYT; 9 wkts	HBH; 15 runs	HBH; 8 wkts	MLR; 5 wkts	MLR; 7 wkts	ADS; 9 wkts	ADS; S/O	PRS; 9 wkts	X	3rd (SF)
Hobart Hurricanes (HBH)	PRS; 5 wkts	PRS; 17 runs	MLR; 3 runs	MLR; S/O	ADS; 7 wkts	ADS; N/R	SYS; 7 wkts	SYT; 44 runs	BRH; 15 runs	BRH; 8 wkts	SYS; 16 runs	SYT; 6 wkts	MLS; 4 wkts	MLS; 4 wkts	SYS; 103 runs	X	4th (SF)
Melbourne Renegades (MLR)	ADS; 14 runs	ADS; 7 wkts	HBH; 3 runs	HBH; S/O	SYT; 8 wkts	SYT; 8 wkts	PRS; 32 runs	MLS; 9 wkts	PRS; 5 wkts	MLS; 5 wkts	BRH; 5 wkts	BRH; 7 wkts	SYS; 6 wkts	SYS; 35 runs	X	X	7th
Melbourne Stars (MLS)	SYT; 6 runs	SYT; 8 wkts	SYS; 7 wkts	SYS; 7 wkts	BRH; 54 runs	BRH; 5 runs	MLR; 9 wkts	PRS; 9 wkts	MLR; 5 wkts	ADS; 6 wkts	ADS; 37 runs	PRS; 33 runs	HBH; 4 wkts	HBH; 4 wkts	X	X	5th
Perth Scorchers (PRS)	HBH; 5 wkts	HBH; 17 runs	BRH; 8 wkts	BRH; 8 wkts	MLR; 32 runs	ADS; 6 wkts	MLR; 5 wkts	MLS; 9 wkts	SYS; 12 runs	SYS; 4 wkts	ADS; 7 wkts	MLS; 33 runs	SYT; 4 runs	SYT; 5 wkts	BRH; 9 wkts	SYS; 7 runs	2nd (RU)
Sydney Sixers (SYS)	BRH; 5 wkts	BRH; 8 wkts	MLS; 7 wkts	MLS; 7 wkts	SYT; 33 runs	HBH; 7 wkts	ADS; 19 runs	ADS; 4 wkts	PRS; 12 runs	PRS; 4 wkts	HBH; 16 runs	SYT; B/C	MLR; 6 wkts	MLR; 35 runs	HBH; 103 runs	PRS; 7 runs	1st (C)
Sydney Thunder (SYT)	MLS; 6 runs	MLS; 8 wkts	ADS; N/R	ADS; 6 wkts	MLR; 8 wkts	MLR; 8 wkts	SYS; 33 runs	BRH; 3 runs	BRH; 9 wkts	HBH; 44 runs	SYS; B/C	HBH; 6 wkts	PRS; 4 runs	PRS; 5 wkts	X	X	6th

Team's results→	Won	Tied	Lost	N/R

== Fixtures ==
Format of the group stage was a double round-robin tournament, with teams playing each other twice. Some matches were played in neutral cities as a result of occasional carnival weekends where as many as all eight teams were scheduled at the same venue. There were 14 double header fixtures with the men's Big Bash League, and the semi-finals and final were also played as a double header.

=== Week 1 ===
Match 1
10 December
10:00
Scorecard

Perth Scorchers; 6/119 (20 overs)	v	Hobart Hurricanes; 5/120 (19 overs)
Katherine Brunt 41 (24); Heather Knight 2/31 (4 overs)		Hayley Matthews 48 (38); Suzie Bates 2/14 (3 overs)

Hobart Hurricanes won by 5 wickets (with 6 balls remaining)
North Sydney Oval No. 2
Umpires: Glen Stubbings and Marc Nickl
Player of the match: Hayley Matthews (Hurricanes)

- Hobart Hurricanes won the toss and elected to field
- Broadcast by cricket.com.au

Match 2
10 December
13:45
Scorecard

Adelaide Strikers; 116 (19.3 overs)	v	Melbourne Renegades; 102 (19.1 overs)
Sophie Devine 43 (38); Molly Strano 3/17 (4 overs)		Sophie Molineux 37* (30); Alex Price 2/8 (1.1 overs)

Adelaide Strikers won by 14 runs
North Sydney Oval
Umpires: Simon Lightbody and Claire Polosak
Player of the match: Sophie Devine (Strikers)

- Melbourne Renegades won the toss and elected to field
- Broadcast by Network Ten

Match 3
10 December
18:15 (D/N)
Scorecard

Melbourne Stars; 8/147 (20 overs)	v	Sydney Thunder; 4/141 (20 overs)
Emma Inglis 46 (28); Erin Osborne 3/27 (4 overs)		Harmanpreet Kaur 47* (28); Alana King 2/21 (4 overs)

Melbourne Stars won by 6 runs
North Sydney Oval
Umpires: Claire Polosak and Tony Wilds
Player of the match: Emma Inglis (Stars)

- Melbourne Stars won the toss and elected to bat
- Broadcast by Network Ten

Match 4
11 December
10:00
Scorecard

Adelaide Strikers; 6/128 (20 overs)	v	Melbourne Renegades; 3/131 (19.3 overs)
Sophie Devine 41* (27); Sophie Molineux 4/18 (4 overs)		Rachel Priest 44 (37); Shelley Nitschke 2/10 (4 overs)

Melbourne Renegades won by 7 wickets (with 3 balls remaining)
North Sydney Oval No. 2
Umpires: Mark Nickl and Glen Stubbings
Player of the match: Sophie Molineux (Renegades)

- Adelaide Strikers won the toss and elected to bat
- Broadcast by cricket.com.au

Match 5
11 December
10:45
Scorecard

Perth Scorchers; 4/142 (20 overs)	v	Hobart Hurricanes; 9/125 (20 overs)
Elyse Villani 54 (45); Hayley Matthews 2/19 (4 overs)		Veronica Pyke 27* (15); Katherine Brunt 2/18 (4 overs)

Perth Scorchers won by 17 runs
North Sydney Oval
Umpires: Donovan Koch and Simon Lightbody
Player of the match: Elyse Villani (Scorchers)

- Perth Scorchers won the toss and elected to bat
- Broadcast by Network Ten

Match 6
11 December
14:00
Scorecard

Sydney Sixers; 6/138 (20 overs)	v	Brisbane Heat; 5/142 (19.2 overs)
Alyssa Healy 48 (42); Jess Jonassen 2/25 (4 overs)		Deandra Dottin 60* (44); Sarah Aley 2/17 (4 overs)

Brisbane Heat won by 5 wickets (with 4 balls remaining)
North Sydney Oval
Umpires: Claire Polosak and Tony Wilds
Player of the match: Deandra Dottin (Heat)

- Sydney Sixers won the toss and elected to bat
- Broadcast by Network Ten

Match 7
12 December
18:00 (D/N)
Scorecard

Brisbane Heat; 9/83 (20 overs)	v	Sydney Sixers; 2/86 (16 overs)
Jemma Barsby 26* (31); Ashleigh Gardner 2/7 (3 overs)		Ellyse Perry 45* (43); Jess Jonassen 1/16 (4 overs)

Sydney Sixers won by 8 wickets (with 24 balls remaining)
Drummoyne Oval, Sydney
Umpires: Ben Treloar and Glen Stubbings
Player of the match: Ellyse Perry (Sixers)

- Brisbane Heat won the toss and elected to bat
- Broadcast by cricket.com.au

Match 8
13 December
10:00
Scorecard

Melbourne Stars; 9/116 (20 overs)	v	Sydney Thunder; 2/121 (18.5 overs)
Jess Cameron 36 (39); Harmanpreet Kaur 4/27 (4 overs)		Rachael Haynes 35 (31); Gemma Triscari 1/10 (3 overs)

Sydney Thunder won by 8 wickets (with 7 balls remaining)
Lavington Sports Ground, Albury
Umpires: Kumar Jeyakkumar and Deanne Young
Player of the match: Harmanpreet Kaur (Stars)

- Melbourne Stars won the toss and elected to bat
- Broadcast by cricket.com.au

=== Week 2 ===
Match 9
16 December
14:00
Scorecard

Sydney Thunder	v	Adelaide Strikers

Match abandoned
Howell Oval, Sydney

- No toss
- Persistent rain meant the match was abandoned without a ball bowled
- Broadcast by cricket.com.au

Match 10
17 December
10:00
Scorecard

Brisbane Heat; 9/101 (20 overs)	v	Perth Scorchers; 2/102 (17.1 overs)
Smriti Mandhana 21 (25); Emma King 2/10 (4 overs)		Nicole Bolton 46* (43); Deandra Dottin 1/18 (4 overs)

Perth Scorchers won by 8 wickets (with 17 balls remaining)
WACA Ground, Perth
Umpires: Hennie Botes and John Taylor
Player of the match: Nicole Bolton (Scorchers)

- Perth Scorchers won the toss and elected to field
- Broadcast by cricket.com.au

Match 11
17 December
14:00
Scorecard

Sydney Sixers; 8/122 (20 overs)	v	Melbourne Stars; 3/124 (17.2 overs)
Sara McGlashan 40 (32); Emma Kearney 3/13 (4 overs)		Meg Lanning 66* (48); Marizanne Kapp 2/21 (4 overs)

Melbourne Stars won by 7 wickets (with 16 balls remaining)
Casey Fields No.4, Melbourne
Umpires: Dale Ireland and David Shepard
Player of the match: Meg Lanning (Stars)

- Sydney Sixers won the toss and elected to bat
- Broadcast by cricket.com.au

Match 12
17 December
14:00
Scorecard

Sydney Thunder; 5/102 (20 overs)	v	Adelaide Strikers; 4/103 (17.5 overs)
Rene Farrell 29* (26); Tahlia McGrath 2/21 (4 overs)		Sophie Devine 44 (33); Samantha Bates 2/14 (4 overs)

Adelaide Strikers won by 6 wickets (with 13 balls remaining)
Howell Oval, Sydney
Umpires: T Penman and Claire Polosak
Player of the match: Sophie Devine (Strikers)

- Sydney Thunder won the toss and elected to bat
- Broadcast by cricket.com.au

Match 13
17 December
16:10
Scorecard

Hobart Hurricanes; 4/133 (20 overs)	v	Melbourne Renegades; 5/130 (20 overs)
Amy Satterthwaite 45* (43); Grace Harris 1/15 (4 overs)		Kris Britt 51* (49); Amy Satterthwaite 2/22 (4 overs)

Hobart Hurricanes won by 3 runs
Queen Elizabeth Oval, Bendigo
Umpires: Daryl Brigham and Stephen Brne
Player of the match: Amy Satterthwaite (Hurricanes)

- Melbourne Renegades won the toss and elected to field
- Broadcast by cricket.com.au

Match 14
17 December
10:00
Scorecard

Sydney Sixers; 8/111 (20 overs)	v	Melbourne Stars; 3/115 (16.5 overs)
Ashleigh Gardner 43 (32); Danielle Hazell 2/15 (4 overs)		Katie Mack 48* (33); Marizanne Kapp 2/13 (3.5 overs)

Melbourne Stars won by 7 wickets (with 19 balls remaining)
Casey Fields No.4, Melbourne
Umpires: Dale Ireland and David Shepard
Player of the match: Danielle Hazell (Stars)

- Melbourne Stars won the toss and elected to field
- Broadcast by cricket.com.au

Match 15
18 December
12:00
Scorecard

Hobart Hurricanes; 5/121 (20 overs)	v	Melbourne Renegades; 6/121 (20 overs)
Amy Satterthwaite 52* (41); Molly Strano 1/14 (4 overs)		Kris Britt 36 (37); Hayley Matthews 4/23 (4 overs)

Hobart Hurricanes won in the super over
Queen Elizabeth Oval, Bendigo
Umpires: Daryl Brigham and Stephen Brne
Player of the match: Amy Satterthwaite (Hurricanes)

- Melbourne Renegades won the toss and elected to field
- Broadcast by cricket.com.au

Match 16
18 December
10:00
Scorecard

Perth Scorchers; 9/94 (20 overs)	v	Brisbane Heat; 2/95 (12.5 overs)
Elyse Villani 19 (23); Jemma Barsby 2/12 (4 overs)		Beth Mooney 67* (46); Emma King 2/30 (4 overs)

Brisbane Heat won by 8 wickets (with 43 balls remaining)
WACA Ground, Perth
Umpires: Trent Steenholdt and John Taylor
Player of the match: Beth Mooney (Heat)

- Brisbane Heat won the toss and elected to field
- Broadcast by cricket.com.au

=== Week 3 ===
Match 17
26 December
13:00
Scorecard

Melbourne Stars; 2/148 (20 overs)	v	Brisbane Heat; 7/94 (20 overs)
Meg Lanning 97* (72); Holly Ferling 1/19 (4 overs)		Kirby Short 27 (37); Morna Nielsen 3/19 (4 overs)

Melbourne Stars won by 54 runs
Allan Border Field, Brisbane
Umpires: S Farrell and Murray Branch
Player of the match: Meg Lanning (Stars)

- Brisbane Heat won the toss and elected to field
- Broadcast by cricket.com.au

Match 18
26 December
14:00
Scorecard

Melbourne Renegades; 4/110 (20 overs)	v	Sydney Thunder; 2/114 (15.5 overs)
Kris Britt 50 (52); Samantha Bates 2/22 (4 overs)		Alex Blackwell 61* (38); Lea Tahuhu 1/14 (4 overs)

Sydney Thunder won by 8 wickets (with 25 balls remaining)
Blacktown International Sportspark, Sydney
Umpires: Anthony Hobson and Dinusha Bandara
Player of the match: Alex Blackwell (Thunder)

- Sydney Thunder won the toss and elected to field
- Broadcast by cricket.com.au

Match 19
26 December
14:00
Scorecard

Hobart Hurricanes; 3/143 (20 overs)	v	Adelaide Strikers; 3/146 (16.3 overs)
Heather Knight 69 (47); Megan Schutt 1/15 (4 overs)		Sophie Devine 103* (48); Veronica Pyke 1/21 (3 overs)

Adelaide Strikers won by 7 wickets (with 21 balls remaining)
Gliderol Stadium, Adelaide
Umpires: Luke Uthenwoldt and Cain Kemp
Player of the match: Sophie Devine (Strikers)

- Adelaide Strikers won the toss and elected to field
- Broadcast by cricket.com.au

Match 20
27 December
10:00
Scorecard

Brisbane Heat; 5/129 (20 overs)	v	Melbourne Stars; 6/124 (20 overs)
Beth Mooney 55 (50); Gemma Triscari 2/20 (4 overs)		Meg Lanning 50 (42); Smriti Mandhana 2/6 (2 overs)

Brisbane Heat won by 5 runs
Allan Border Field, Brisbane
Umpires: Stephen Dionysuis and Donovan Koch
Player of the match: Beth Mooney (Heat)

- Brisbane Heat won the toss and elected to bat
- Play was delayed when Brisbane Heat's Deandra Dottin sustained a head injury while fielding
- Broadcast by cricket.com.au

Match 21
27 December
14:00
Scorecard

Melbourne Renegades; 6/93 (20 overs)	v	Sydney Thunder; 2/96 (11.4 overs)
Danielle Wyatt 26 (21); Erin Osborne 3/23 (4 overs)		Stafanie Taylor 48* (37); Molly Strano 2/15 (3 overs)

Sydney Thunder won by 8 wickets (with 56 balls remaining)
Blacktown International Sportspark, Sydney
Umpires: Anthony Hobson and Yohan Ramasundara
Player of the match: Stafanie Taylor (Thunder)

- Sydney Thunder won the toss and elected to field
- Broadcast by cricket.com.au

Match 22
27 December
14:00
Scorecard

Hobart Hurricanes	v	Adelaide Strikers

Match abandoned
Gliderol Stadium, Adelaide

- Match was washed out, Strikers' second washout for the season
- Broadcast by cricket.com.au

Match 23
28 December
14:35
Scorecard

Sydney Sixers; 3/164 (20 overs)	v	Sydney Thunder; 7/131 (20 overs)
Alyssa Healy 55 (38); Rachael Haynes 1/11 (2 overs)		Erin Osborne 32 (30); Marizanne Kapp 2/29 (4 overs)

Sydney Sixers won by 33 runs
Spotless Stadium, Sydney
Umpires: Mark Nickl and T Penman
Player of the match: Alyssa Healy (Sixers)

- Sydney Thunder won the toss and chose to field
- Double header with BBL game
- Broadcast by cricket.com.au

Match 24
29 December
14:30
Scorecard

Hobart Hurricanes; 8/106 (20 overs)	v	Sydney Sixers; 3/110 (18.2 overs)
Hayley Matthews 27 (33); Sarah Aley 3/13 (3 overs)		Ellyse Perry 44* (44); Hayley Matthews 2/20 (3.2 overs)

Sydney Sixers won by 7 wickets (with 10 balls remaining)
Hurstville Oval, Sydney
Umpires: Anthony Hobson and T Penman
Player of the match: Sarah Aley (Sixers)

- Hobart Hurricanes won the toss and elected to bat
- Broadcast by cricket.com.au

Match 25
29 December
14:35
Scorecard

Perth Scorchers; 5/155 (20 overs)	v	Melbourne Renegades; 7/123 (20 overs)
Elyse Villani 60 (43); Molly Strano 2/25 (4 overs)		Sophie Molineux 37 (37); Emma King 2/25 (4 overs)

Perth Scorchers won by 32 runs
Etihad Stadium, Melbourne
Umpires: Daryl Brigham and Dale Ireland
Player of the match: Elyse Villani (Scorchers)

- Melbourne Renegades won the toss and elected to field
- Melbourne Renegades were penalised 0.5 points for slow over rate
- Double header with BBL game
- Broadcast by cricket.com.au

=== Week 4 ===
Match 26
31 December
12:45
Scorecard

Adelaide Strikers; 9/82 (20 overs)	v	Perth Scorchers; 4/85 (15.5 overs)
Tahlia McGrath 27 (31); Heather Graham 2/12 (3 overs)		Nicole Bolton 28 (32); Megan Schutt 2/16 (3 overs)

Perth Scorchers won by 6 wickets (with 25 balls remaining)
Adelaide Oval
Umpires: Simon Lightbody and Luke Uthenwoldt
Player of the match: Katherine Brunt (Scorchers)

- Adelaide Strikers won the toss and elected to bat
- Double header with BBL game
- Broadcast by Network Ten

Match 27
1 January
13:45
Scorecard

Melbourne Stars; 3/127 (20 overs)	v	Melbourne Renegades; 1/52 (5.3 overs)
Meg Lanning 64 (53); Nicole Goodwin 1/29 (4 overs)		Rachel Priest 31 (19); Natalie Sciver 1/6 (1 over)

Melbourne Renegades won by 9 wickets (D/L method)
Melbourne Cricket Ground
Attendance: 24,547
Attendance: 24,547
Umpires: Stephen Brne and David Shepard
Player of the match: Rachel Priest (Renegades)

- Melbourne Stars won the toss and elected to bat
- Melbourne Renegades' target revised to 52 runs from 8 overs following a rain delay
- The match was played in front of a WBBL record crowd of 24,547
- Double header with BBL game
- Broadcast by Network Ten

Match 28
2 January
13:00
Scorecard

Sydney Thunder; 8/132 (20 overs)	v	Brisbane Heat; 9/129 (20 overs)
Rachael Haynes 40 (29); Haidee Birkett 2/25 (4 overs)		Beth Mooney 34 (40); Nicola Carey, Samantha Bates 2/18 (4 overs)

Sydney Thunder won by 3 runs
Blacktown International Sportspark, Sydney
Umpires: Marc Nickl and T Penman
Player of the match: Samantha Bates (Thunder)

- Brisbane Heat won the toss and elected to field
- Sydney Thunder was penalised 1 point for slow over rate
- Broadcast by cricket.com.au

Match 29
2 January
12:30
Scorecard

Sydney Sixers; 3/161 (20 overs)	v	Adelaide Strikers; 5/142 (20 overs)
Alyssa Healy 51 (40); Sarah Coyte 2/34 (4 overs)		Tammy Beaumont 57 (56); Sarah Aley 1/18 (4 overs)

Sydney Sixers won by 19 runs
Adelaide Oval
Umpires: Craig Thomas and Luke Uthenwoldt
Player of the match: Alyssa Healy (Sixers)

- Sydney Sixers won the toss and elected to bat
- Broadcast by cricket.com.au

Match 30
3 January
13:00
Scorecard

Sydney Thunder; 8/115 (20 overs)	v	Brisbane Heat; 1/117 (18.5 overs)
Alex Blackwell 43 (49); Kara Sutherland 3/5 (2 overs)		Beth Mooney 75* (66)

Brisbane Heat won by 9 wickets (with 7 balls remaining)
Blacktown International Sportspark, Sydney
Umpires: Marc Nickl and T Penman
Player of the match: Beth Mooney (Heat)

- Sydney Thunder won the toss and elected to bat
- Broadcast by cricket.com.au

Match 31
3 January
12:30
Scorecard

Adelaide Strikers; 94 (19.5 overs)	v	Sydney Sixers; 6/97 (17.5 overs)
Tammy Beaumont 30 (34); Lisa Sthalekar 3/12 (3.5 overs)		Ellyse Perry 48* (41); Amanda-Jade Wellington 2/16 (4 overs)

Sydney Sixers won by 4 wickets (with 13 balls remaining)
Adelaide Oval
Umpires: Cain Kemp and Craig Thomas
Player of the match: Ellyse Perry (Sixers)

- Adelaide Strikers won the toss and elected to bat
- Broadcast by cricket.com.au

Match 32
4 January
13:00
Scorecard

Perth Scorchers; 7/131 (20 overs)	v	Melbourne Renegades; 5/132 (18.1 overs)
Heather Graham 30 (25); Molly Strano 2/18 (4 overs)		Danielle Wyatt 43 (42); Emma King 2/30 (4 overs)

Melbourne Renegades won by 5 wickets (with 11 balls remaining)
Camberwell Sports Ground, Melbourne
Umpires: Daryl Brigham and Stephen Brne
Player of the match: Grace Harris (Renegades)

- Perth Scorchers won the toss and elected to bat
- Broadcast by cricket.com.au

Match 33
5 January
13:00
Scorecard

Melbourne Stars; 6/117 (20 overs)	v	Perth Scorchers; 1/118 (16.1 overs)
Meg Lanning 30 (27); Emma King 1/19 (4 overs)		Elyse Villani 57 (44); Morna Nielsen 1/20 (3 overs)

Perth Scorchers won by 9 wickets (with 23 balls remaining)
Toorak Park, Melbourne
Umpires: Dale Ireland and David Shepard
Player of the match: Elyse Villani (Scorchers)

- Perth Scorchers won the toss and elected to field
- Broadcast by cricket.com.au

Match 34
5 January
18:30 (D/N)
Scorecard

Hobart Hurricanes; 3/171 (20 overs)	v	Sydney Thunder; 9/127 (20 overs)
Heather Knight 47 (29); Rene Farrell 1/19 (3 overs)		Harmanpreet Kaur 32 (32); Brooke Hepburn 2/20 (4 overs)

Hobart Hurricanes won by 44 runs
University of Tasmania Stadium, Launceston
Umpires: Darren Close and Muhammad Qureshi
Player of the match: Heather Knight (Hurricanes)

- Hobart Hurricanes won the toss and elected to bat
- Broadcast by cricket.com.au

=== Week 5 ===
Match 35
7 January
14:35
Scorecard

Melbourne Stars; 7/127 (20 overs)	v	Melbourne Renegades; 5/128 (19.3 overs)
Natalie Sciver 37 (27); Molly Strano 2/20 (4 overs)		Danielle Wyatt 40 (31); Gemma Triscari 1/17 (4 overs)

Melbourne Renegades won by 5 wickets (with 3 balls remaining)
Etihad Stadium, Melbourne
Umpires: Stephan Brne and Dale Ireland
Player of the match: Danielle Wyatt (Renegades)

- Melbourne Renegades won the toss and elected to field
- Double header with BBL game
- Broadcast by cricket.com.au

Match 36
8 January
13:45
Scorecard

Brisbane Heat; 2/153 (20 overs)	v	Hobart Hurricanes; 8/138 (20 overs)
Beth Mooney 78* (60); Amy Satterthwaite 1/18 (4 overs)		Amy Satterthwaite 57 (48); Jemma Barsby 3/34 (4 overs)

Brisbane Heat won by 15 runs
Blundstone Arena, Hobart
Umpires: Darren Close and Simon Lightbody
Player of the match: Beth Mooney (Heat)

- Brisbane Heat won the toss and elected to bat
- Double header with BBL game
- Broadcast by Network Ten

Match 37
8 January
14:30
Scorecard

Sydney Sixers; 6/132 (20 overs)	v	Perth Scorchers; 6/120 (20 overs)
Ashleigh Gardner 40 (23); Anya Shrubsole 2/20 (4 overs)		Suzie Bates 52 (53); Lauren Smith 2/23 (4 overs)

Sydney Sixers won by 12 runs
Hurstville Oval, Sydney
Umpires: T Pennman and Tony Wilds
Player of the match: Ashleigh Gardner (Sixers)

- Sydney Sixers won the toss and elected to bat
- Broadcast by cricket.com.au

Match 38
9 January
14:30
Scorecard

Perth Scorchers; 9/129 (20 overs)	v	Sydney Sixers; 6/133 (19.3 overs)
Lauren Ebsary 37 (28); Lauren Smith 4/23 (4 overs)		Alyssa Healy 46 (31); Katherine Brunt 2/25 (4 overs)

Sydney Sixers won by 4 wickets (with 3 balls remaining)
Sydney Cricket Ground
Umpires: G Stubbings and Ben Treloar
Player of the match: Alyssa Healy (Sixers)

- Perth Scorchers won the toss and elected to bat
- Double header with BBL game
- Broadcast by cricket.com.au

Match 39
9 January
18:30 (D/N)
Scorecard

Brisbane Heat; 122 (19.4 overs)	v	Hobart Hurricanes; 2/123 (18.2 overs)
Smriti Mandhana 40 (33); Hayley Matthews 5/19 (3.4 overs)		Georgia Redmayne 64* (50); Jess Jonassen 1/16 (4 overs)

Hobart Hurricanes won by 8 wickets (with 10 balls remaining)
Blundstone Arena, Hobart
Umpires: Darren Close and Muhammad Qureshi
Player of the match: Hayley Matthews (Hurricanes)

- Brisbane Heat won the toss and elected to bat
- Broadcast by cricket.com.au

Match 40
10 January
15:05
Scorecard

Adelaide Strikers; 9/94 (20 overs)	v	Melbourne Stars; 4/96 (16.5 overs)
Bridget Patterson 22* (24); Kristen Beams 3/12 (4 overs)		Katie Mack 31* (33); Megan Schutt 2/14 (4 overs)

Melbourne Stars won by 6 wickets (with 19 balls remaining)
Melbourne Cricket Ground
Umpires: Daryl Brigham and Stephen Brne
Player of the match: Kristen Beams (Stars)

- Melbourne Stars won the toss and elected to field
- Double header with BBL game
- Broadcast by cricket.com.au
- Former Australian player Sarah Elliott made her last WBBL appearance

=== Week 6 ===
Match 41
13 January
14:30
Scorecard

Sydney Sixers; 6/134 (20 overs)	v	Hobart Hurricanes; 8/118 (20 overs)
Ellyse Perry 60 (54); Julie Hunter 2/13 (4 overs)		Corinne Hall 42 (43); Sarah Aley 3/20 (4 overs)

Sydney Sixers won by 16 runs
North Sydney Oval
Umpires: G Stubbings and Ben Treloar
Player of the match: Ellyse Perry (Sixers)

- Hobart Hurricanes won the toss and elected to field
- Broadcast by cricket.com.au

Match 42
13 January
14:00
Scorecard

Melbourne Stars; 125 (19.3 overs)	v	Adelaide Strikers; 88 (17.4 overs)
Jess Cameron 42 (48); Megan Schutt 2/15 (4 overs)		Charlotte Edwards 35 (39); Kristen Beams 3/11 (3 overs)

Melbourne Stars won by 37 runs
Lilac Hill, Perth
Umpires: A Kovalevs and Todd Rann
Player of the match: Jess Cameron (Stars)

- Adelaide Strikers won the toss and elected to field
- Broadcast by cricket.com.au

Match 43
14 January
10:00
Scorecard

Melbourne Renegades; 102 (18.5 overs)	v	Brisbane Heat; 5/105 (17.5 overs)
Kris Britt 32 (26); Jemma Barsby 4/13 (3 overs)		Beth Mooney 45 (39); Danielle Wyatt 2/12 (3 overs)

Brisbane Heat won by 5 wickets (with 13 balls remaining)
Allan Border Field, Brisbane
Umpires: Murray Branch and Steven Farrell
Player of the match: Jemma Barsby (Heat)

- Brisbane Heat won the toss and elected to field
- Broadcast by cricket.com.au

Match 44
14 January
13:45
Scorecard

Sydney Sixers; 7/138 (20 overs)	v	Sydney Thunder; 6/138 (20 overs)
Ashleigh Gardner 54 (41); Rene Farrell 3/26 (4 overs)		Stafanie Taylor 68 (51); Lisa Sthalekar 2/19 (2 overs)

Sydney Thunder won on boundary count
Sydney Cricket Ground
Umpires: Claire Polosak and Tony Wilds
Player of the match: Stafanie Taylor (Thunder)

- Sydney Sixers won the toss and elected to bat
- Double header with BBL game
- Broadcast by Network Ten

Match 45
14 January
13:35
Scorecard

Adelaide Strikers; 6/120 (20 overs)	v	Perth Scorchers; 3/122 (18 overs)
Charlotte Edwards 31 (23); Piepa Cleary 3/21 (4 overs)		Heather Graham 39*(30); Tahlia McGrath 1/17 (4 overs)

Perth Scorchers won by 7 wickets (with 12 balls remaining)
WACA Ground, Perth
Umpires: Nathan Johnstone and Trent Steenholdt
Player of the match: Heather Graham (Scorchers)

- Perth Scorchers won the toss and elected to field
- Double header with BBL game
- Broadcast by cricket.com.au
- Former Australian player Shelley Nitschke made her last WBBL appearance

Match 46
15 January
10:00
Scorecard

Brisbane Heat; 8/125 (20 overs)	v	Melbourne Renegades; 3/102 (14 overs)
Delissa Kimmince 39 (31); Molly Strano 3/19 (4 overs)		Rachel Priest 44 (39); Jess Jonassen 2/6 (3 overs)

Melbourne Renegades won by 7 wickets (with 6 balls remaining) (D/L method)
Allan Border Field, Brisbane
Umpires: Stephen Dionysius and David Taylor
Player of the match: Rachel Priest (Renegades)

- Melbourne Renegades won the toss and elected to field
- Melbourne Renegades' target revised to 102 runs from 15 overs following a rain delay
- Broadcast by cricket.com.au

Match 47
15 January
10:00
Scorecard

Perth Scorchers; 4/130 (20 overs)	v	Melbourne Stars; 9/97 (20 overs)
Lauren Ebsary 45* (53); Emma Kearney 1/11 (4 overs)		Natalie Sciver 31 (32); Anya Shrubsole 2/9 (3 overs)

Perth Scorchers won by 33 runs
Lilac Hill, Perth
Umpires: Hennie Botes and Nathan Johnstone
Player of the match: Katherine Brunt (Scorchers)

- Melbourne Stars won the toss and elected to field
- Broadcast by cricket.com.au

Match 48
16 January
18:30 (D/N)
Scorecard

Sydney Thunder; 9/115 (20 overs)	v	Hobart Hurricanes; 4/117 (18.2 overs)
Alex Blackwell 49 (50); Amy Satterthwaite 5/17 (4 overs)		Erin Burns 38 (33); Harmanpreet Kaur 2/18 (4 overs)

Hobart Hurricanes won by 6 wickets (with 10 balls remaining)
Blundstone Arena, Hobart
Umpires: Muhammad Qureshi and Harvey Wolff
Player of the match: Amy Satterthwaite (Hurricanes)

- Sydney Thunder won the toss and elected to bat
- Broadcast by cricket.com.au
- Amy Satterthwaite became the third player to take a WBBL hat-trick

=== Week 7 ===
Match 49
20 January
14:05
Scorecard

Adelaide Strikers; 5/139 (20 overs)	v	Brisbane Heat; 1/142 (15 overs)
Tammy Beaumont 50* (42); Delissa Kimmince 2/18 (3 overs)		Beth Mooney 75* (47); Tahlia McGrath 1/18 (2 overs)

Brisbane Heat won by 9 wickets (with 30 balls remaining)
The Gabba, Brisbane
Umpires: Murray Branch and Stephen Dionysius
Player of the match: Beth Mooney (Heat)

- Brisbane Heat won the toss and elected to field
- Double header with BBL game
- Broadcast by cricket.com.au

Match 50
20 January
14:00
Scorecard

Perth Scorchers; 5/149 (20 overs)	v	Sydney Thunder; 6/145 (20 overs)
Elyse Villani 74 (55); Nicola Carey 2/15 (2 overs)		Harmanpreet Kaur 64* (37); Piepa Cleary 3/16 (4 overs)

Perth Scorchers won by 4 runs
Lilac Hill, Perth
Umpires: James Hewitt and Todd Rann
Player of the match: Elyse Villani (Scorchers)

- Sydney Thunder won the toss and elected to field
- Broadcast by cricket.com.au

Match 51
20 January
17:30 (D/N)
Scorecard

Hobart Hurricanes; 3/115 (14 overs)	v	Melbourne Stars; 6/98 (12 overs)
Heather Knight 45 (31); Emma Kearney 1/19 (3 overs)		Emma Inglis 51 (31); Brooke Hepburn 2/14 (2 overs)

Melbourne Stars won by 4 wickets (with 0 balls remaining) (D/L method)
Blundstone Arena, Hobart
Umpires: Darren Close and Harvey Wolff
Player of the match: Emma Inglis (Stars)

- Melbourne Stars won the toss and elected to field
- Hobart Hurricanes' innings reduced to 14 overs due to rain delay
- Melbourne Stars' target revised to 98 runs from 12 overs
- Broadcast by cricket.com.au

Match 52
20 January
14:30
Scorecard

Sydney Sixers; 5/148 (20 overs)	v	Melbourne Renegades; 4/150 (18.4 overs)
Ashleigh Gardner 56 (38); Molly Strano 2/27 (4 overs)		Rachel Priest 44 (40); Ashleigh Gardner 2/22 (4 overs)

Melbourne Renegades won by 6 wickets (with 8 balls remaining)
North Sydney Oval
Umpires: Anthony Hobson and Ben Treloar
Player of the match: Maitlan Brown (Renegades)

- Melbourne Renegades won the toss and elected to field
- Broadcast by cricket.com.au
- Former Australian player Lisa Sthalekar made her last WBBL appearance

Match 53
21 January
10:00
Scorecard

Brisbane Heat; 6/127 (20 overs)	v	Adelaide Strikers; 8/127 (20 overs)
Deandra Dottin 51 (41); Amanda-Jade Wellington 2/8 (4 overs)		Tammy Beaumont 58 (54); Sammy-Jo Johnson 2/10 (2 overs)

Brisbane Heat won in Super Over
The Gabba, Brisbane
Umpires: Steven Farrell and David Taylor
Player of the match: Deandra Dottin (Heat)

- Adelaide Strikers won the toss and elected to field
- Broadcast by cricket.com.au

Match 54
21 January
11:45
Scorecard

Melbourne Stars; 8/135 (20 overs)	v	Hobart Hurricanes; 6/136 (19.5 overs)
Meg Lanning 81 (55); Hayley Matthews 2/23 (3 overs)		Heather Knight 35 (26); Kristen Beams 3/11 (4 overs)

Hobart Hurricanes won by 4 wickets (with 1 ball remaining)
Blundstone Arena, Hobart
Umpires: Muhammad Qureshi and David Shepard
Player of the match: Meg Lanning (Stars)

- Melbourne Stars won the toss and elected to bat
- Double header with BBL game
- Broadcast by Network Ten

Match 55
21 January
14:30
Scorecard

Sydney Sixers; 5/158 (20 overs)	v	Melbourne Renegades; 9/123 (20 overs)
Alyssa Healy 84 (56); Molly Strano 2/33 (4 overs)		Sophie Molineux 24 (25); Sarah Aley 3/14 (4 overs)

Sydney Sixers won by 35 runs
North Sydney Oval
Umpires: Anthony Hobson and Ben Treloar
Player of the match: Alyssa Healy (Sixers)

- Melbourne Renegades won the toss and elected to field
- Broadcast by cricket.com.au

Match 56
21 January
14:00
Scorecard

Perth Scorchers; 4/131 (20 overs)	v	Sydney Thunder; 5/134 (19.1 overs)
Nicole Bolton 53 (43); Nicola Carey 2/30 (4 overs)		Stafanie Taylor 62 (54); Elyse Villani 3/16 (2.1 overs)

Sydney Thunder won by 5 wickets (with 5 balls remaining)
Lilac Hill, Perth
Umpires: James Hewitt and A Kovalevs
Player of the match: Stafanie Taylor (Thunder)

- Perth Scorchers won the toss and elected to bat
- Broadcast by cricket.com.au

== Knockout phase ==
Semifinals
1	Sydney Sixers	6/169
4	Hobart Hurricanes	66
2	Perth Scorchers	1/125
3	Brisbane Heat	5/124

Finals
2	Perth Scorchers	7/117
1	Sydney Sixers	5/124

=== Semi-finals ===
Semi-final 1
24 January
11:40
Scorecard

Brisbane Heat; 5/124 (20 overs)	v	Perth Scorchers; 1/125 (15.4 overs)
Kirby Short 39 (49); Emma King 2/17 (4 overs)		Elyse Villani 52 (48)

Perth Scorchers won by 9 wickets (with 26 balls remaining)
WACA Ground, Perth
Umpires: Michael Graham-Smith and Damien Mealey
Player of the match: Emma King (Scorchers)

- Perth Scorchers won the toss and elected to field
- Played as a double header with BBL semi-final 1
- Broadcast by Network Ten

Semi-final 2
25 January
13:40
Scorecard

Sydney Sixers; 6/169 (20 overs)	v	Hobart Hurricanes; 66 (14.1 overs)
Alyssa Healy 77 (45); Erin Burns 2/26 (4 overs)		Erin Burns 14 (15); Ashleigh Gardner 2/9 (3 overs)

Sydney Sixers won by 103 runs
The Gabba, Brisbane
Umpires: Phillip Gillespie and Tony Wilds
Player of the match: Alyssa Healy (Sixers)

- Sydney Sixers won the toss and elected to bat
- Played as a double header with BBL semi-final 2
- Broadcast by Network Ten
- Hobart Hurricanes set a new record for lowest all out WBBL team score
- Sydney Sixers set a new record for biggest WBBL winning margin (by runs)
- Former Australian player Julie Hunter made her last WBBL appearance

=== Final ===
28 January
10:45
Scorecard

Sydney Sixers; 5/124 (20 overs)	v	Perth Scorchers; 7/117 (20 overs)
Alyssa Healy 40 (27); Anya Shrubsole 2/17 (4 overs)		Katherine Brunt 35* (30); Sarah Aley 4/23 (4 overs)

Sydney Sixers won by 7 runs
WACA Ground, Perth
Umpires: Shawn Craig and Greg Davidson
Player of the match: Sarah Aley (Sixers)

- Perth Scorchers won the toss and elected to field
- Played as a double header with BBL final
- Sydney Sixers won their first WBBL title
- Broadcast by Network Ten

== Statistics ==
=== Highest totals ===
Team	Score	Against	Venue	Date
Hobart Hurricanes	3/171 (20 overs)	Sydney Thunder	UTAS Stadium	5 January 2017
Sydney Sixers	6/169 (20 overs)	Hobart Hurricanes	The Gabba	25 January 2017
Sydney Sixers	3/164 (20 overs)	Sydney Thunder	Spotless Stadium	28 December 2016
Sydney Sixers	6/161 (20 overs)	Adelaide Strikers	Adelaide Oval	2 January 2017
Sydney Sixers	5/158 (20 overs)	Melbourne Renegades	North Sydney Oval	21 January 2017

- Source: CricInfo

=== Most runs ===
Player	Team	Runs
Meg Lanning	Melbourne Stars	502
Beth Mooney	Brisbane Heat	482
Alyssa Healy	Sydney Sixers	479
Elyse Villani	Perth Scorchers	442
Ashleigh Gardner	Sydney Sixers	414

- Source: CricInfo

=== Most wickets ===
Player	Team	Wickets
Sarah Aley	Sydney Sixers	28
Molly Strano	Melbourne Renegades	21
Hayley Matthews	Hobart Hurricanes	20
Jess Jonassen	Brisbane Heat	18
Emma King	Perth Scorchers	17

- Source: CricInfo

== Awards ==
=== Player of the tournament ===
Player of the Tournament votes are awarded on a 3-2-1 basis by the two standing umpires at the conclusion of every match, meaning a player can receive a maximum of six votes per game.

Pos.	Player	Team	Votes
1st	Beth Mooney	Brisbane Heat	34
2nd	Amy Satterthwaite	Hobart Hurricanes	29
3rd	Ashleigh Gardner	Sydney Sixers	26
=4th	Meg Lanning	Melbourne Stars	24
=4th	Alyssa Healy	Sydney Sixers	24

Source: WBBL|02 Player of the tournament

=== Team of the tournament ===
An honorary XI recognising the standout performers of WBBL|02 was named by bigbash.com.au:

- Meg Lanning (Melbourne Stars)
- Beth Mooney (Brisbane Heat)
- Ellyse Perry (Sydney Sixers)
- Ashleigh Gardner (Sydney Sixers)
- Sophie Devine (Adelaide Strikers)
- Jess Jonassen (Brisbane Heat)
- Katherine Brunt (Perth Scorchers)
- Marizanne Kapp (Sydney Sixers)
- Sarah Aley (Sydney Sixers)
- Kristen Beams (Melbourne Stars)
- Molly Strano (Melbourne Renegades)

=== Young gun award ===
Players under 21 years of age at the start of the season are eligible for the Young Gun Award. Weekly winners are selected over the course of the season by a panel of Cricket Australia officials based on match performance, on-field and off-field attitude, and their demonstration of skill, tenacity and good sportsmanship. Each weekly winner receives a $500 Rebel gift card and the overall winner receives a $5000 cash prize, as well as access to a learning and mentor program.

The nominees for the WBBL|02 Young Gun were:

- Week 1: Sophie Molineux (Melbourne Renegades)
- Week 2: Ashleigh Gardner (Sydney Sixers) – winner
- Week 3: Tahlia McGrath (Adelaide Strikers)
- Week 4: Heather Graham (Perth Scorchers)
- Week 5: Lauren Smith (Sydney Sixers)
- Week 6: Jemma Barsby (Brisbane Heat)
- Week 7: Amanda-Jade Wellington (Adelaide Strikers)

Sydney Sixers all-rounder Ashleigh Gardner was named the Young Gun of WBBL|02, having scored 414 runs with the bat and claiming ten wickets with the ball throughout the season.

== Audience ==
There was greater television coverage than the previous season, with twelve games aired live by Network Ten, including four stand-alone games on the opening weekend. This included the Sydney Thunder vs Melbourne Stars match, which was shown on Network Ten's primary channel during prime time—a first for a stand-alone women's sporting match in Australia. The remaining 47 games were streamed live through Cricket Australia's Live app and Website, and the WBBL Facebook page.

Below are the Australian television ratings for the season.

Match No	Teams	Average TV Ratings			
Match No	Teams	National		5 metro cities	
Match No	Teams	Session 1	Session 2	Session 1	Session 2
2	Adelaide Strikers vs Melbourne Renegades	224,000	310,000	148,000	193,000
3	Sydney Thunder vs Melbourne Stars	340,000	432,000	222,000	286,000
5	Perth Scorchers vs Hobart Hurricanes	146,000	237,000	98,000	161,000
6	Sydney Sixers vs Brisbane Heat	332,000	371,000	219,000	251,000
26	Adelaide Strikers vs Perth Scorchers	179,000	247,000	126,000	159,000
27	Melbourne Stars vs Melbourne Renegades	242,000	320,000	151,000	223,000
36	Hobart Hurricanes vs Brisbane Heat	206,000	298,000	124,000	183,000
44	Sydney Sixers vs Sydney Thunder	179,000	268,000	112,000	180,000
54	Hobart Hurricanes vs Melbourne Stars	100,000	182,000	60,000	117,000
SF1	Perth Scorchers vs Brisbane Heat	75,000	103,000	53,000	76,000
SF2	Sydney Sixers vs Hobart Hurricanes	94,000	100,000	66,000	70,000
Final	Perth Scorchers vs Sydney Sixers	325,000	500,000	210,000	339,000
