= Kara Sutherland =

Australian cricketer

Personal information
- Full name: Kara Sutherland
- Born: 26 September 1991 (age 35); Ballina, New South Wales
- Batting: Left-handed
- Bowling: Left-arm fast-medium
- Role: Bowler

Domestic team information
- Years: Team
- 2010–15: New South Wales Breakers
- 2015–: Queensland Fire
- 2015–16: Sydney Sixers
- 2016–: Brisbane Heat (squad no. 26)
- Source: Cricinfo, 15 March 2017

Kara Sutherland (born 26 September 1991) is an Australian cricketer who plays, mainly as a pace bowler, for Queensland Fire and Brisbane Heat. Previously, she took the field for New South Wales Breakers and Sydney Sixers.

Born in Grafton, New South Wales, Sutherland began playing cricket when she was nine years old. Although her South Grafton school did not have enough girl players to make up a girls cricket team, she was later a prominent member of the NSW Youth squads.

On her debut for the New South Wales Breakers in October 2010, Sutherland earned a Player of the Match award. During the 2010–11 season, she played a major role in the Breakers' Twenty20 squad, and also a bit-part in its WNCL 50-over matches. The following season, her on-field results were disappointing, and she played only one WNCL match. However, she also received the Bradman Scholarship from the Bradman Foundation and a Ben Lexcen Scholarship from the University of New South Wales, and toured New Zealand with the Shooting Stars.

During pre-season training for the 2012–13 season, Sutherland was diagnosed with Plantar fasciitis, or "jogger's heel", initially in one of her feet, but later in both. The jogger's heel put her at a disadvantage against most of her team mates, but eventually she fought back to resume her place in the Breakers squad. In 2013–14, Sutherland played in all the Breakers' WNCL games apart from the first one, which she missed due to a broken thumb, and took a bag full of wickets in the Twenty20 competition. At the end of that season, she was once again selected for a Shooting Stars tour, to Sri Lanka.

In 2014–15, Sutherland played for the Breakers in the WNCL semi-final against Victorian Spirit, but was not selected for the final against the South Australian Scorpions. She then joined English county side Kent, for which she achieved her best bowling figures for the year of 3-17 against Lancashire.

At the start of the 2015–16 season, Sutherland moved to the Queensland Fire, where she sought more opportunities to break into the Southern Stars team. However, she also joined the Sydney Sixers squad for its inaugural WBBL01 season (2015–16). Explaining her choice of WBBL club, she told The Daily Examiner, "Sydney's a great city. The colour of the team helped and I guess the rest of the squad that we have was the major drawcard to play for the Sixers." In June 2016, Sutherland injured her knee ligaments in a fall; the injury caused her to concentrate on her batting while she was recovering. Despite that setback, she played for Queensland Fire in its last three matches of the 2016–17 WNCL competition, including the final, and was signed by Brisbane Heat for the WBBL02 season.

Sutherland is a cousin of Mitchell Aubusson, who won an NRL premiership with the Sydney Roosters in 2013. When not playing cricket, she is a member of Queensland Cricket's Game and Market Development team, and has also played soccer.
