= Sarah Aley =

Australian cricketer

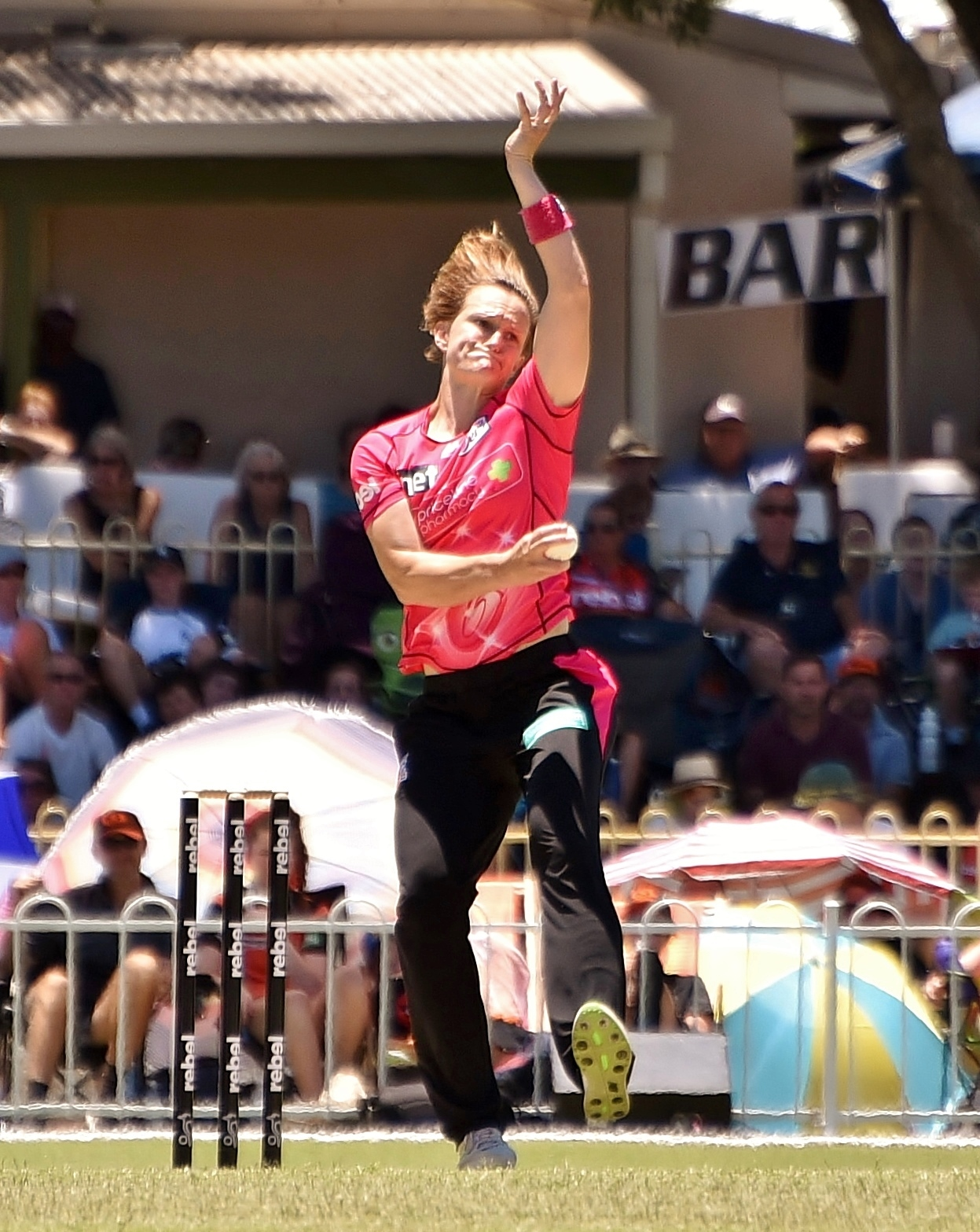
- Aley bowling for the Sydney Sixers

Personal information
- Full name: Sarah Elizabeth Aley
- Born: 3 June 1984 (age 42); Sydney, New South Wales, Australia
- Batting: Right-handed
- Bowling: Right arm medium
- Role: Bowler

International information
- National side: Australia (2017)
- Only ODI (cap 136): 5 July 2017 v Pakistan
- T20I debut (cap 47): 17 November 2017 v England
- Last T20I: 19 November 2017 v England

Domestic team information
- Years: Team
- 2004/05–2019/20: New South Wales
- 2007–2011: Warwickshire
- 2015/16–2020/21: Sydney Sixers

Career statistics
Competition	WODI	WT20I	LA	T20
Matches	1	2	141	145
Runs scored	15	1	1,021	366
Batting average	–	1.00	16.73	8.51
100s/50s	0/0	0/0	1/1	0/0
Top score	15*	1	125	41
Balls bowled	60	24	4,537	2,312
Wickets	2	0	116	139
Bowling average	14.50	–	25.70	17.33
5 wickets in innings	0	–	0	0
10 wickets in match	0	–	0	0
Best bowling	2/29	–	4/35	4/8
Catches/stumpings	1/–	0/–	56/–	25/–
- Source: CricketArchive, 6 August 2025

Sarah Elizabeth Aley (born 3 June 1984) is an Australian former cricketer. She played domestic cricket for New South Wales in the Women's National Cricket League (WNCL) and the Sydney Sixers in the Women's Big Bash League (WBBL). In 2017 she played three matches for the Australian national cricket team. She retired from all forms of cricket in 2020.

== Cricket career ==
Aley played domestic cricket for New South Wales, making her state debut in the 2004/05 season. Her only international call-up in the first part of her career was for Australia's under-23 team in 2004. Women's cricket at state level was still amateur, without player contracts, while Aley was in her 20s, so she worked full-time at the University of Sydney to earn money while playing cricket. Aley struggled with injuries in her late 20s, so she considered retiring from the sport until Cricket Australia introduced contracts for state players.

Aley had her breakout season in the 2016/17 summer. Playing for the Sydney Sixers, she was the leading wicket-taker in the second season of the Women's Big Bash League (WBBL) and was the player of the match in the tournament final. She took four wickets to help the Sixers defend a total that was seen as below par. At the end of the season she had more wickets in the WBBL than any other bowler. As a reward for her form, she received a call-up to join the Australian national cricket team squad for a Twenty20 International (T20I) series against New Zealand, but she did not play a match.

Aley was again included in Australia's squad for the 2017 Women's Cricket World Cup. During the World Cup, she made her One Day International (ODI) debut against Pakistan, becoming the oldest women's Australian player to make their ODI debut in nearly 45 years. In November 2017, Aley was included in the Australian squad for the T20I portion of the Women's Ashes Series. During this series, she made her T20I debut.

While playing for the Sydney Sixers in the 2017–18 WBBL season, Aley scored two runs off the final ball of a match against the Melbourne Renegades to tie the score and force the game into a Super Over. Initially, Aley only scored a single run, but Renegades wicket-keeper Emma Inglis caught the ball without standing over the stumps and waiting for confirmation that the ball was dead. Inglis threw the ball into the air and allowed it to hit the ground, keeping the ball live, so Aley ran a second run. The Sixers still lost the match in the Super Over.

In May 2020, Aley announced her retirement from one-day cricket and the NSW Breakers. In November 2020, Aley also announced her retirement from the WBBL.
