= Claire Koski =

Australian cricketer (born 1991)

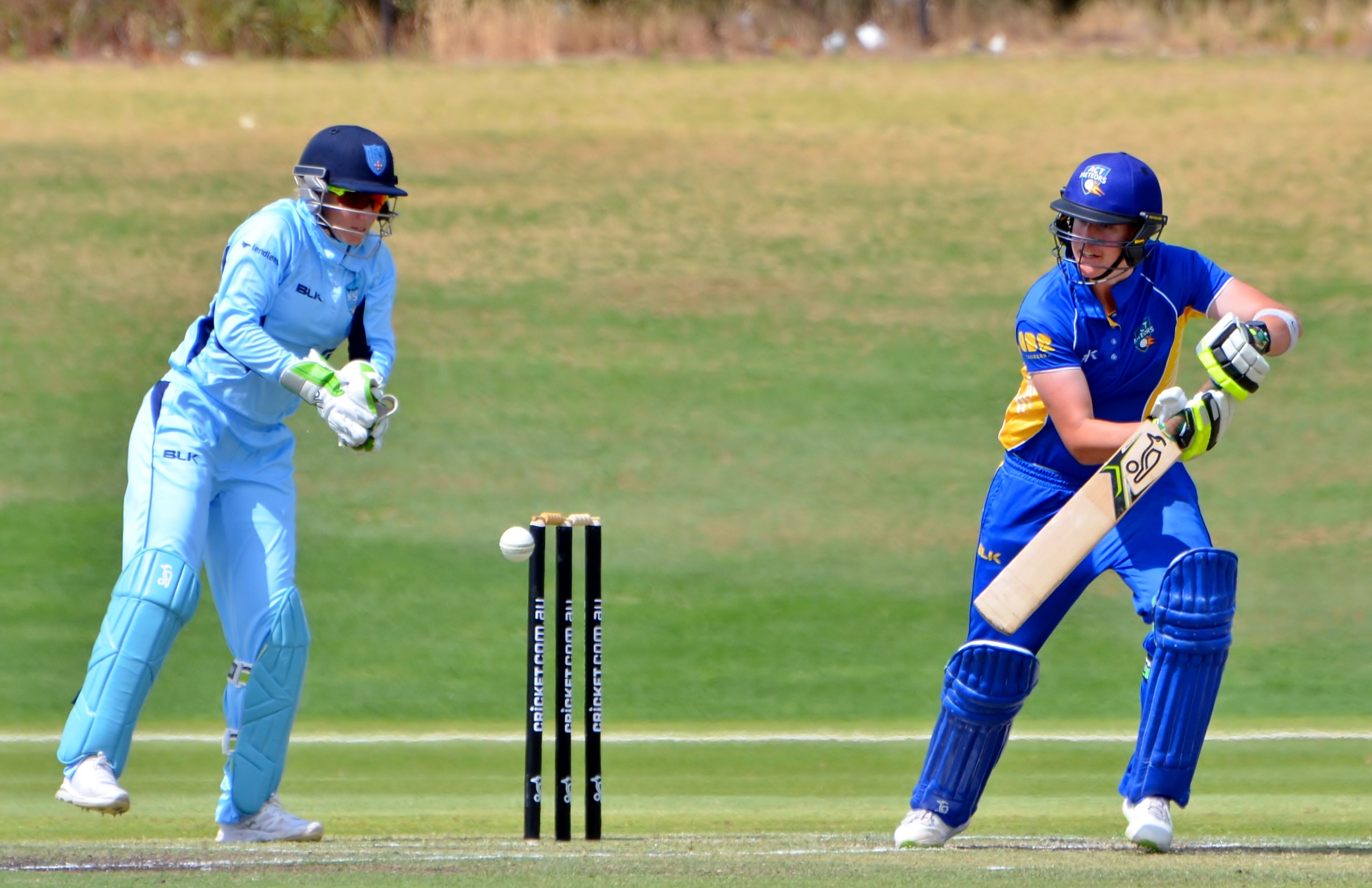
- Koski batting for the ACT Meteors, 2017

Personal information
- Full name: Claire Jennifer Koski
- Born: 13 March 1991 (age 35); Campbelltown, New South Wales
- Batting: Right-handed
- Bowling: Right-arm medium fast
- Role: All-rounder / Wicket-keeper

Domestic team information
- Years: Team
- New South Wales Breakers
- 2015–: ACT Meteors
- 2015–2017: Sydney Thunder
- 2017–: Melbourne Renegades
- Source: Cricinfo, 4 August 2018

Claire Jennifer Koski (born 13 March 1991) is an Australian cricketer who plays for the ACT Meteors and the Melbourne Renegades. She has previously played for the New South Wales Breakers and Sydney Thunder, and was a member of Australia's 2014 World Cup-winning women's indoor cricket team. Claire was educated at Macarthur Anglican School in Camden where she was the only female team member who played in the school's 1st Eleven.

In November 2018, she was named in the Melbourne Renegades' squad for the 2018–19 Women's Big Bash League season.
