= Emma Inglis =

Australian cricketer (born 1988)

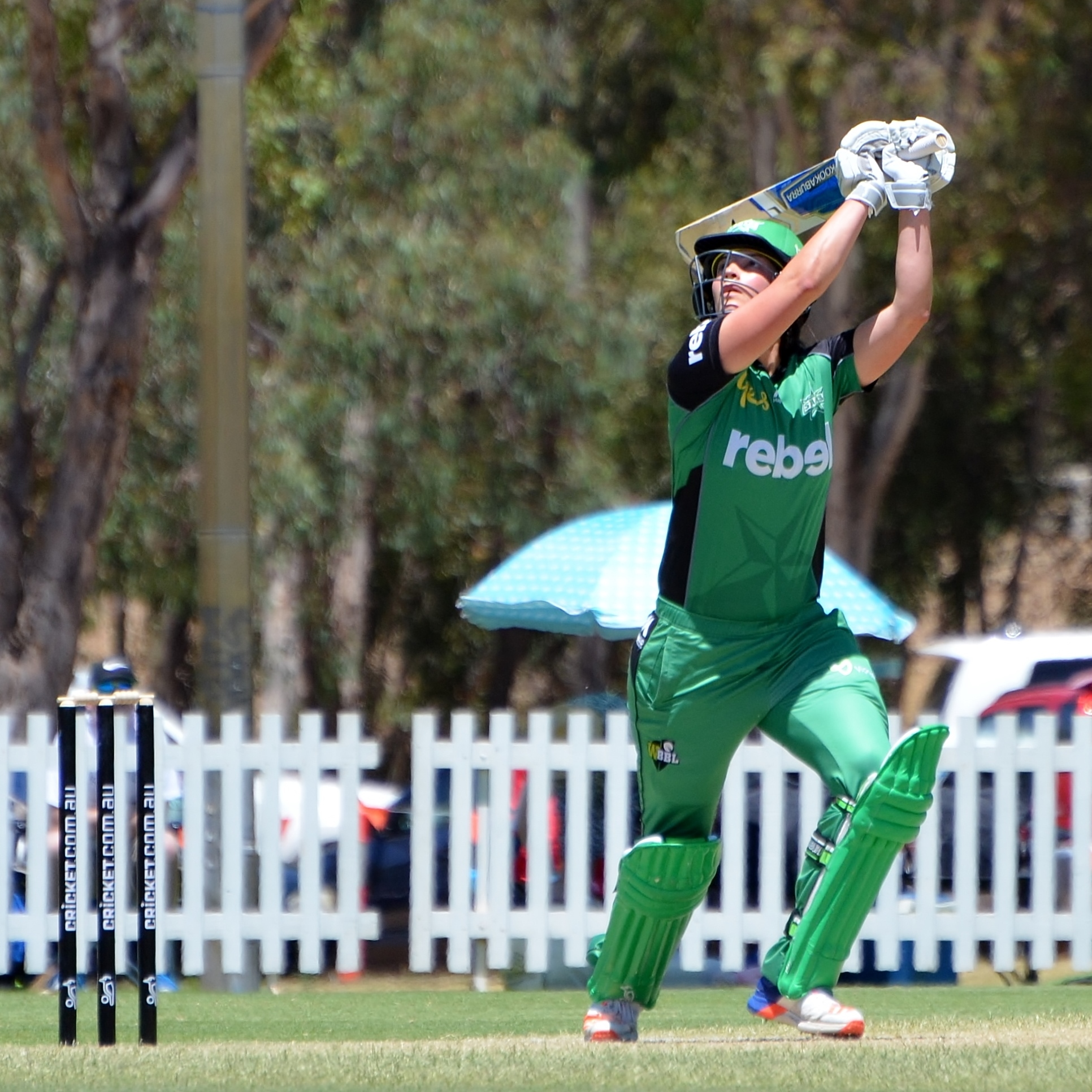
- Inglis batting for Melbourne Stars during WBBL02.

Personal information
- Full name: Emma Jane Inglis
- Born: 15 July 1988 (age 38); Fitzroy, Victoria, Australia
- Batting: Right-handed
- Role: Wicket-keeper

Domestic team information
- Years: Team
- Victorian Spirit
- 2015–: Melbourne Stars (squad no. 19)
- Source: Cricinfo, 4 March 2017

Emma Jane Inglis (born 15 July 1988) is an Australian cricketer. She plays as a wicket-keeper and right-handed batter for Victorian Spirit and Melbourne Stars. In November 2018, she was named in the Melbourne Renegades' squad for the 2018–19 Women's Big Bash League season.
