= Megan Banting =

Australian cricketer

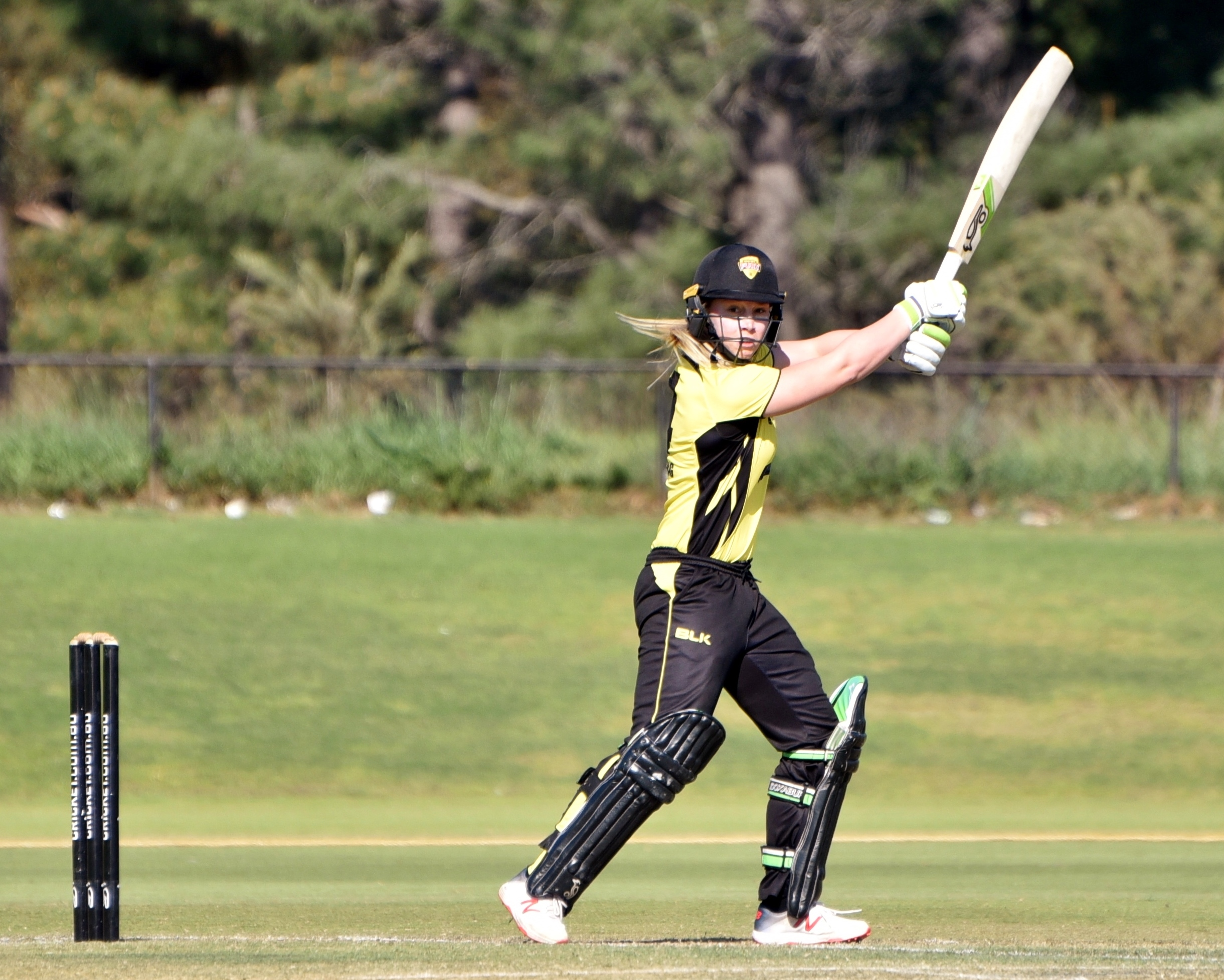
- Banting batting for Western Australia, 2018

Personal information
- Full name: Megan Peta Banting
- Born: 11 February 1996 (age 30); Subiaco, Western Australia
- Batting: Right-handed
- Role: Wicket-keeper

Domestic team information
- Years: Team
- 2013/14–2020/21: Western Australia
- 2015/16–2018/19: Perth Scorchers
- 2020/21: Perth Scorchers

Career statistics
Competition	WLA	WT20
Matches	43	34
Runs scored	499	130
Batting average	16.09	7.22
100s/50s	0/2	0/0
Top score	57*	18
Catches/stumpings	16/8	3/1
- Source: CricketArchive, 27 March 2021

Megan Peta Banting (born 11 February 1996) is an Australian cricketer who plays as a wicket-keeper and right-handed batter.

Banting was raised in the Perth suburb of Tuart Hill. She made a memorable debut for Western Australia as a 14-year old in the Under 15s, in a match in which the WA team defeated New South Wales. At the 2012 Under 18 national titles, she scored 86 runs for WA, including 26 in the fifth-place final against South Australia.

After making her Fury debut in 2014–15, Banting was selected in the Shooting Stars squad to tour to Dubai in March–April 2015. She then became the Fury's number one keeper, ahead of veteran Jenny Wallace, for its 2015–16 WNCL campaign, and also kept wickets for the Scorchers in four matches during its inaugural WBBL|01 season (2015–16).

In February 2016, Banting was named in a Shooting Stars 13-player development squad to face Sri Lanka and England in a limited-overs tri-series in Sri Lanka beginning the following month. In August 2016, she was again selected for the Shooting Stars, this time to attend a talent camp at the National Cricket Centre in Brisbane. In the first of the matches at the camp, she starred as a batter, with a score of 96 runs.

During the 2016–17 season, Banting was once again the Fury wicketkeeper, and kept wickets for the Scorchers in December 2016. However, she was then replaced in the Scorchers team by Emily Smith, who had been the Hobart Hurricanes keeper during the WBBL|01 season.

In November 2018, she was named in the Perth Scorchers' squad for the 2018–19 Women's Big Bash League season.
