= Emma King (cricketer) =

Australian cricketer (born 1992)

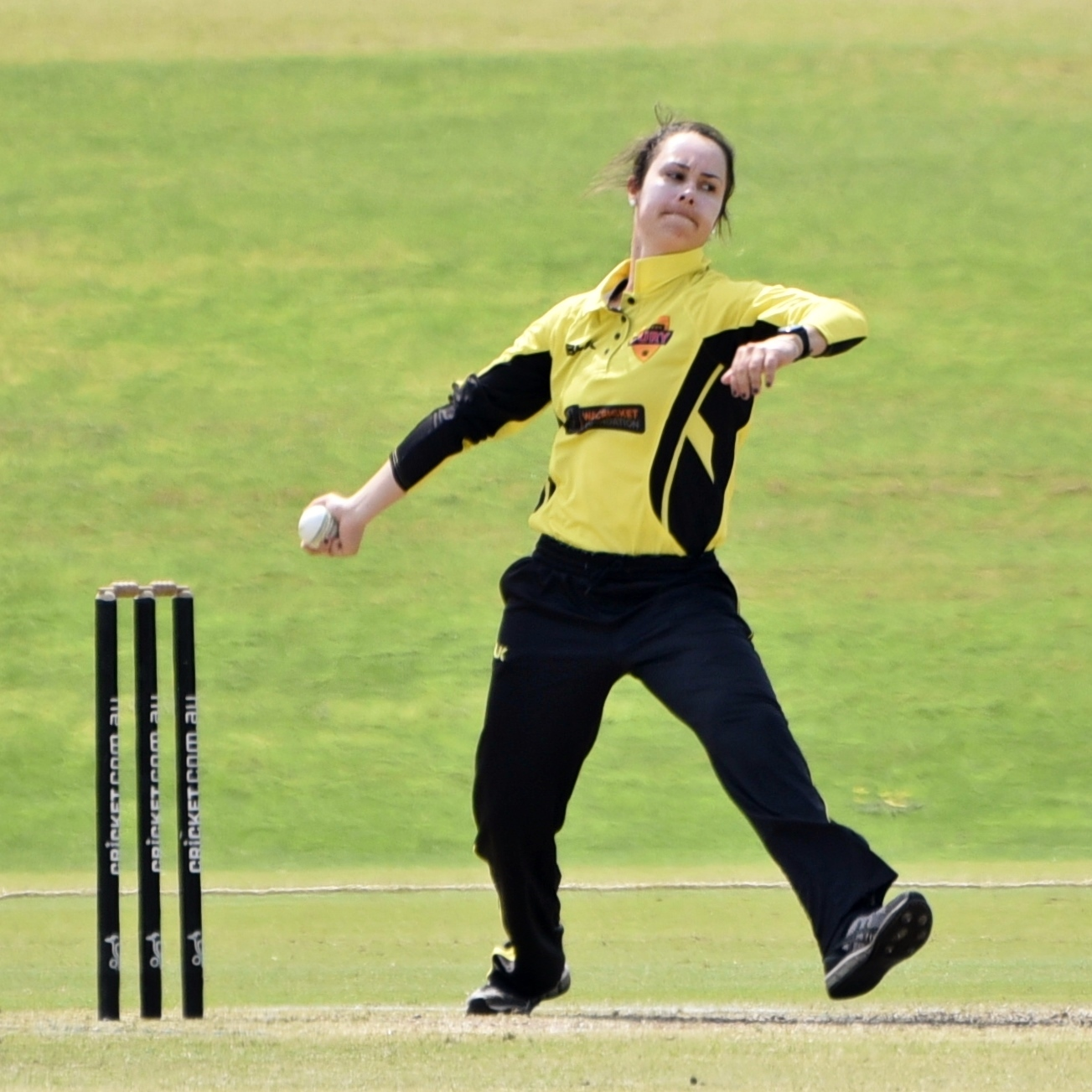
- King bowling for Western Fury, 2018

Personal information
- Full name: Emma Louise King
- Born: 25 March 1992 (age 34); Subiaco, Perth, Western Australia
- Batting: Right-handed
- Bowling: Right-arm off-break
- Role: Bowler

Domestic team information
- Years: Team
- 2009/10–2020/21: Western Australia (squad no. 2)
- 2015/16–2020/21: Perth Scorchers (squad no. 2)

Career statistics
Competition	WLA	WT20
Matches	67	102
Runs scored	349	170
Batting average	9.43	11.33
100s/50s	0/0	0/0
Top score	42	20*
Balls bowled	3,128	1,683
Wickets	76	68
Bowling average	29.38	25.51
5 wickets in innings	0	0
10 wickets in match	0	0
Best bowling	4/17	4/9
Catches/stumpings	20/–	15/–
- Source: CricketArchive, 27 March 2021

Emma Louise King (born 25 March 1992) is an Australian former cricketer who played as a right-arm off-break bowler and right-handed batter. She played domestic cricket for Western Australia from her debut in the 2009–10 season. In the 2013–14 Australian Women's Twenty20 Cup, she was the leading wicket-taker with 13 wickets which included a performance of 4/9 against the New South Wales Breakers. More recently she claimed six wickets in the 2016-17 WNCL tournament. She also played for the Perth Scorchers in both the first season and second season of the Women's Big Bash League Twenty20 competition.

As of December 2016, King was employed as a physical education teacher at St Hilda's Anglican School for Girls in Mosman Park, a suburb of Perth.

In November 2018, she was named in the Perth Scorchers squad for the 2018–19 Women's Big Bash League season.

On 20 March 2021, King announced her retirement from professional cricket.
