= Kirby Short =

Australian cricketer

Personal information
- Full name: Kirby Short
- Born: 3 November 1986 (age 40); Brisbane, Queensland
- Batting: Right-handed
- Bowling: Right-arm off break
- Role: Batter
- Relatives: Mick Harvey (grandfather)

Domestic team information
- Years: Team
- 2005/06–2019/20: Queensland Fire (squad no. 10)
- 2015/16–2019/20: Brisbane Heat (squad no. 10)
- Source: Cricinfo, 9 March 2017

Kirby Short (born 3 November 1986) is an Australian former cricketer who played for and captained the Queensland Fire and Brisbane Heat.

== Early life and career ==
Short was born into a sporting family. Her mother represented Australia at softball and her grandfather, Mick Harvey, played first class cricket for Victoria and Queensland, and was later a Test cricket umpire. Mick Harvey's brothers, Merv and Neil Harvey, were both Australian Test cricketers; the latter came to prominence as the youngest member of the legendary Invincibles touring team.

Short played under-17 and under-19 indoor cricket for Queensland, and also represented Queensland at youth level in volleyball and softball.

== Cricket career ==
In December 2005, Short made her debut for Queensland Fire. She was a member of the Brisbane Heat squad from its inaugural WBBL|01 season (2015–16). In January 2017, she became Brisbane Heat's captain, replacing Delissa Kimmince who had stepped down. She later captained the Heat to consecutive WBBL titles in the WBBL|04 (2018–19) and WBBL|05 (2019–20) tournaments. Members of the Heat squads for those two seasons later told cricket.com.au that in their opinion, Short was far and away the greatest behind-the-scenes influence on the team's victories.

Short retired from representative cricket at the end of the 2019–20 WNCL season.

== Personal life ==
Following Short's retirement, she has been a commentator on radio for the Australian Broadcasting Commission and television on Seven Sport and Fox Cricket. She has worked as a physical education teacher, and has returned to teaching after her retirement from cricket. In 2019 she became deputy principal at MacGregor State High School in Brisbane.
