= 2015–16 Melbourne Renegades WBBL season =

Melbourne Renegades
2015–16 season
- Coach: Lachlan Stevens
- Captain(s): Sarah Elliott
- Home ground: Etihad Stadium, Junction Oval
- WBBL Season: 8th
- WBBL Finals: DNQ
- Leading Run Scorer: Dane van Niekerk (275)
- Leading Wicket Taker: Molly Strano (18)
- Highest home attendance: 14,611

The 2015–16 Melbourne Renegades WBBL season was the inaugural in the team's history. Coached by Lachlan Stevens and captained by Sarah Elliott, they competed in the WBBL's 2015–16 season.

== Fixtures ==
=== Regular season ===
11 December
19:00 (D/N)
CA Scorecard
Cricinfo Scorecard

Melbourne Renegades; 10/86 (18 overs)	v	Hobart Hurricanes; 5/121 (20 overs)
Sarah Elliot 27 (33); Nicola Hancock 1/13 (2 overs)		Amy Satterthwaite 36 (35); Veronica Pyke 2/12 (4 overs)

Hobart Hurricanes won by 35 runs
Aurora Stadium, Launceston
Umpires: D Close, H Wolff
Player of the match: Corinne Hall (Hurricanes)

- Hobart Hurricanes won the toss and elected to bat.

12 December
13:30
CA Scorecard
Cricinfo Scorecard

Hobart Hurricanes; 7/125 (20 overs)	v	Melbourne Renegades; 7/121 (20 overs)
Heather Knight 38 (38); Veronica Pyke 3/19 (4 overs)		Dane van Niekerk 45 (44); Jenny Taffs 1/6 (1 overs)

Hobart Hurricanes won by 4 runs
Aurora Stadium, Launceston
Umpires: D Close, M Qureshi
Player of the match: Heather Knight (Hurricanes)

- Hobart Hurricanes won the toss and elected to bat.

18 December
10:00
CA Scorecard
Cricinfo Scorecard

Melbourne Renegades; 10/124 (19.5 overs)	v	Brisbane Heat; 4/151 (20 overs)
Sarah Elliott 49 (37); Danielle Wyatt 2/21 (4 overs)		Beth Mooney 64 (51); Delissa Kimmince 3/23 (3 overs)

Brisbane Heat won by 27 runs
Allan Border Field, Brisbane
Umpires: M Brnch, J Ruddick-Collins
Player of the match: Beth Mooney (Heat)

- Brisbane Heat won the toss and elected to bat.

19 December
10:00
CA Scorecard
Cricinfo Scorecard

Sydney Thunder; 4/130 (19.3 overs)	v	Melbourne Renegades; 9/128 (20 overs)
Stafanie Taylor 35 (27); Lauren Cheatle 3/28 (4 overs)		Rachel Priest 47 (39); Briana Binch 1/15 (3 overs)

Sydney Thunder won by 6 wickets
Allan Border Field, Brisbane
Umpires: M Branch, B Farrell
Player of the match: Lauren Cheatle (Thunder)

- Melbourne Renegades won the toss and elected to bat.

20 December
10:00
CA Scorecard
Cricinfo Scorecard

Brisbane Heat; 10/110 (19.1 overs)	v	Melbourne Renegades; 3/112 (16.5 overs)
Beth Mooney 50 (38); Delissa Kimmince 3/19 (3.5 overs)		Rachel Priest 29 (34); Danielle Wyatt 4/13 (4 overs)

Melbourne Renegades won by 7 wickets
The Gabba, Brisbane
Umpires: MS Branch, BR Farrell
Player of the match: Danielle Wyatt (Renegades)

- Brisbane Heat won the toss and elected to bat.

2 January
13:40
CA Scorecard
Cricinfo Scorecard

Melbourne Stars; 9/85 (20 overs)	v	Melbourne Renegades; 5/86 (19.5 overs)
Mignon du Preez 36 (48); Natalie Sciver 1/4 (3 overs)		Sophie Molineux 30 (46); Molly Strano 5/15 (4 overs)

Melbourne Renegades won by 5 wickets
Melbourne Cricket Ground
Attendance: 12,901
Umpires: D Ireland, DJ Shepard
Player of the match: Molly Strano (Renegades)

- Melbourne Stars won the toss and elected to bat.
- Double header with BBL.

3 January
14:30
CA Scorecard
Cricinfo Scorecard

Melbourne Renegades; 8/112 (20 overs)	v	Melbourne Stars; 4/120 (20 overs)
Molly Strano 29* (16); Sophie Molineux 1/5 (1 overs)		Meg Lanning 77* (58); Hayley Jensen 3/25 (4 overs)

Melbourne Stars won by 8 runs
Melbourne Cricket Ground
Umpires: D Brigham, S Brne
Player of the match: Meg Lanning (Stars)

- Melbourne Stars won the toss and elected to bat.

8 January
14:00
CA Scorecard
Cricinfo Scorecard

Melbourne Renegades; 8/139 (20 overs)	v	Sydney Sixers; 5/164 (20 overs)
Kris Britt 36 (31); Sophie Molineux 3/31 (4 overs)		Alyssa Healy 81 (54); Sarah Aley 3/17 (4 overs)

Sydney Sixers won by 25 runs
Junction Oval, Melbourne
Umpires: D Ireland, D Brigham
Player of the match: Alyssa Healy (Sixers)

- Sydney Sixers won the toss and elected to bat.

9 January
14:40
CA Scorecard
Cricinfo Scorecard

Melbourne Renegades; 8/139 (20 overs)	v	Sydney Thunder; 10/103 (19.4 overs)
Rachel Priest 57 (55); Sophie Molineux 3/18 (4 overs)		Alex Blackwell 45 (41); Belinda Vakarewa 2/13 (3 overs)

Melbourne Renegades won by 36 runs
Etihad Stadium, Melbourne
Attendance: 14,611
Umpires: D Shepard, S Lightbody
Player of the match: Rachel Priest (Renegades)

- Melbourne Renegades won the toss and elected to bat.
- Double header with BBL.

10 January
14:30
CA Scorecard
Cricinfo Scorecard

Sydney Sixers; 2/129 (14.4 overs)	v	Melbourne Renegades; 6/128 (20 overs)
Ellyse Perry 67* (46); Marizanne Kapp 2/13 (4 overs)		Dane van Niekerk 38 (41); Kirsty Lamb 1/13 (1.4 overs)

Sydney Sixers won by 8 wickets
Junction Oval, Melbourne
Umpires: D Brigham, S Brne
Player of the match: Ellyse Perry (Sixers)

- Melbourne Renegades won the toss and elected to bat.

15 January
14:30
CA Scorecard
Cricinfo Scorecard

Adelaide Strikers; 10/141 (19.3 overs)	v	Melbourne Renegades; 8/141 (20 overs)
Danielle Wyatt 55 (45); Briana Binch 3/17 (2 overs)		Lauren Ebsary 49* (39); Sarah Coyte 3/32 (4 overs)

Adelaide Strikers won in Super Over
Adelaide Oval No.2
Umpires: C Black, C Thomas

- Melbourne Renegades won the toss and elected to bat.
- Melbourne Renegades was eliminated from the season as a result of this match.

16 January
14:30
CA Scorecard
Cricinfo Scorecard

Perth Scorchers; 1/133 (16 overs)	v	Melbourne Renegades; 6/130 (20 overs)
Elyse Villani 72 (50); Katherine Brunt 2/12 (3 overs)		Dane van Niekerk 52 (44); Danielle Wyatt 1/14 (2 overs)

Perth Scorchers won by 9 wickets
Adelaide Oval No.2
Umpires: C Black, C Thomas
Player of the match: Elyse Villani (Scorchers)

- Melbourne Renegades won the toss and elected to bat.

17 January
10:00
CA Scorecard
Cricinfo Scorecard

Melbourne Renegades; 8/128 (20 overs)	v	Adelaide Strikers; 10/113 (19 overs)
Danielle Wyatt 48 (37); Danielle Wyatt 3/20 (4 overs)		Sarah Taylor 32 (31); Amanda Wellington 3/16 (4 overs)

Melbourne Renegades won by 15 runs
Adelaide Oval No.2
Umpires: C Black, C Kemp
Player of the match: Danielle Wyatt (Renegades)

- Melbourne Renegades won the toss and elected to bat.
- Adelaide Strikers was eliminated from the season as a result of this match.

17 January
14:30
CA Scorecard
Cricinfo Scorecard

Melbourne Renegades; 8/108 (20 overs)	v	Perth Scorchers; 1/111 (15.2 overs)
Cassie Brock 31 (29); Briana Binch 1/15 (3 overs)		Charlotte Edwards 63 (51); Nicky Shaw 3/28 (4 overs)

Perth Scorchers won by 9 wickets
Adelaide Oval No.2
Umpires: C Thomas, L Uthenwoldt
Player of the match: Charlotte Edwards (Scorchers)

- Perth Scorchers won the toss and elected to bowl.
- Perth Scorchers qualified for the semi-finals as a result of this match.
- Melbourne Stars was eliminated from the season as a result of this match.

== Ladder ==
Pos	Team	Pld	W	L	NR	Pts	NRR
1	Sydney Thunder (C)	14	9	5	0	18	0.358
2	Hobart Hurricanes	14	8	6	0	16	0.190
3	Sydney Sixers (RU)	14	8	6	0	16	−0.070
4	Perth Scorchers	14	7	7	0	14	0.166
5	Melbourne Stars	14	7	7	0	14	0.034
6	Brisbane Heat	14	7	7	0	14	−0.094
7	Adelaide Strikers	14	6	8	0	12	−0.131
8	Melbourne Renegades	14	4	10	0	8	−0.463

- The top four teams qualified for the play-off phase.

== Squad ==
Each WBBL|01 squad featured 14 active players, with an allowance of up to five marquee signings including a maximum of three from overseas. Australian marquees are defined as players who made at least ten limited-overs appearances for the national team between 1 July 2012 and 1 July 2015. The table below lists the Renegades players and their key stats (including runs scored, batting strike rate, wickets taken, economy rate, catches and stumpings) for the season.

No.	Name	Nationality	Date of birth	Batting style	Bowling style	G	R	SR	W	E	C	S	Notes
Batters
8	Kris Britt	Australia	13 April 1984	Right-handed	Right-arm leg spin	14	191	87.21	7	6.66	2	–	
31	Cassie Brock	Australia	30 January 1991	Right-handed	Right-arm leg spin	10	58	81.69	0	9.00	3	–	
23	Sarah Elliot	Australia	4 January 1982	Right-handed	Right-arm off spin	14	206	92.37	4	6.37	8	–	Captain
All-rounders
	Makinley Blows	Australia	12 December 1997	Right-handed	Right-arm medium	–	–	–	–	–	–	–	Development rookie
	Mariko Hill	Hong Kong	20 November 1995	Right-handed	Right-arm medium	–	–	–	–	–	–	–	Associate rookie
5	Molly Strano	Australia	5 October 1992	Right-handed	Right-arm off spin	14	116	103.57	18	6.12	3	–	
9	Jenny Taffs	Australia	18 June 1995	Right-handed	Right-arm leg spin	13	61	75.30	1	6.00	5	–	
20	Dane van Niekerk	South Africa	14 May 1993	Right-handed	Right-arm leg spin	14	275	99.27	9	6.95	0	–	Overseas marquee
28	Danielle Wyatt	England	22 April 1991	Right-handed	Right-arm off spin	13	249	104.18	14	5.69	2	–	Overseas marquee
Wicketkeepers
15	Erica Kershaw	Australia	23 December 1991	Left-handed	–	7	27	100.00	–	–	3	0	
13	Rachel Priest	New Zealand	13 July 1985	Right-handed	–	12	249	103.31	–	–	4	10	Overseas marquee
Bowlers
12	Briana Binch	Australia	18 June 1987	Right-handed	Right-arm medium	13	21	72.41	9	7.37	0	–	
4	Nicola Hancock	Australia	8 November 1995	Right-handed	Right-arm fast medium	9	32	82.05	1	8.12	2	–	
2	Shabnim Ismail	South Africa	5 October 1988	Left-handed	Right-arm fast	2	11	57.89	3	4.00	1	–	Overseas marquee (replacement)
27	Kirsty Lamb	Australia	27 June 1994	Right-handed	Left-arm medium	8	7	70.00	1	9.60	0	–	
25	Sophie Molineux	Australia	17 January 1998	Left-handed	Left-arm orthodox	10	49	76.56	8	5.88	4	–	
32	Georgia Wareham	Australia	26 May 1999	Right-handed	Right-arm leg spin	1	–	–	0	10.00	1	–	
