= 2015–16 Women's National Cricket League season =

Cricket tournament

Women's National Cricket League 2015–16 season
- Dates: 9 October 2015 – 29 November 2015
- Administrator: Cricket Australia
- Cricket format: Limited overs cricket (50 overs)
- Tournament format(s): Round-robin and final
- Champions: South Australia (1st title)
- Runners-up: New South Wales
- Participants: 7
- Matches: 24
- Player of the series: (New South Wales) Ellyse Perry
- Most runs: (New South Wales) Ellyse Perry (403)
- Most wickets: (South Australia) Megan Schutt (14)
- Official website: cricket.com.au

The 2015–16 Women's National Cricket League season was the 20th season of the Women's National Cricket League, the women's domestic limited overs cricket competition in Australia. The tournament started on 9 October 2015 and finished on 29 November 2015. South Australian Scorpions won the title for the first time after finishing second on the ladder and beating defending champions New South Wales Breakers in the final, ending the Breakers' 10-tournament winning streak. Ellyse Perry was named player of the tournament.

== Ladder ==
As of 22 November 2015

Pos	Team	Pld	W	L	T	NR	BP	Pts	NRR
1	New South Wales	6	5	1	0	0	4	24	1.437
2	South Australia	6	5	1	0	0	1	21	0.499
3	Queensland	6	3	3	0	0	2	14	−0.018
4	Australian Capital Territory	6	3	3	0	0	1	13	−0.169
5	Victoria	6	3	3	0	0	1	13	−0.172
6	Western Australia	6	2	4	0	0	0	8	−0.423
7	Tasmania	6	0	6	0	0	0	0	−1.085

Updated to match(es) played on 22 November 2015. Source:
Rules for classification: The top two ranked teams qualified for the final.
- Points system: 4 for a win, 2 each for a tie or a no result, 0 for a loss, 1 each for an abandoned match.
- Bonus point system: 2 for win with a run rate twice that of the opposition, 1 for win with a run rate 1.25 times that of the opposition.

== Fixtures ==
=== Round 1 ===
Match 1
9 October 2015
10:00
Scorecard

(home team) Western Australia; 5/219 (50 overs)	v	New South Wales; 9/220 (49.5 overs)
Nicole Bolton 104 (141); Lauren Smith 2/45 (10 overs)		Rachael Haynes 72 (90); Nicky Shaw 4/29 (10 overs)

New South Wales won by 1 wicket (with 1 ball remaining)
WACA Ground, Perth
Umpires: James Hewitt and Nathan Johnstone
Player of the match: Nicky Shaw (Western Australia)

- Western Australia won the toss and elected to bat.
- Points: New South Wales 4, Western Australia 0.

Match 2
9 October 2015
10:00
Scorecard

(home team) Queensland; 7/245 (50 overs)	v	Victoria; 4/246 (48.4 overs)
Grace Harris 67 (56); Danni Wyatt 3/40 (10 overs)		Meg Lanning 89* (94); Jemma Barsby 2/50 (10 overs)

Victoria won by 6 wickets (with 8 balls remaining)
Allan Border Field, Brisbane
Umpires: Claire Polosak and Murray Branch
Player of the match: Meg Lanning (Victoria)

- Victoria won the toss and elected to field.
- Points: Victoria 5, Queensland 0.

Match 3
9 October 2015
10:00
Scorecard

Tasmania; 182 (49.2 overs)	v	Australian Capital Territory; 3/184 (37.5 overs)
Corinne Hall 64 (93); Erin Osborne 2/35 (10 overs)		Katie Mack 67 (113); Amy Satterthwaite 1/26 (3 overs)

ACT won by 7 wickets (with 73 balls remaining)
The Gabba, Brisbane
Umpires: Donovan Koch and Wade Stewart
Player of the match: Sara McGlashan (Australian Capital Territory)

- Tasmania won the toss and elected to bat.
- Points: Australian Capital Territory 4, Tasmania 0.

Match 4
10 October 2015
10:00
Scorecard

South Australia; 5/281 (50 overs)	v	New South Wales; 7/280 (50 overs)
Sarah Taylor 101 (103); Rene Farrell 2/65 (10 overs)		Alex Blackwell 118* (139); Megan Schutt 4/42 (10 overs)

South Australia won by 1 run
WACA Ground, Perth
Umpires: James Hewitt and Todd Rann

- South Australia won the toss and elected to bat.
- Points: South Australia 4, New South Wales 0.

Match 5
10 October 2015
10:00
Scorecard

(home team) Queensland; 6/255 (50 overs)	v	Australian Capital Territory; 9/245 (50 overs)
Delissa Kimmince 72 (104); Samantha Bates 2/37 (8 overs)		Katie Mack 61 (106); Sammy-Jo Johnson 3/37 (10 overs)

Queensland won by 10 runs
Allan Border Field, Brisbane
Umpires: Benjamin Farrell and Wade Stewart

- Queensland won the toss and elected to bat.
- Points: Queensland 4, ACT 0.

Match 6
10 October 2015
10:00
Scorecard

Tasmania; 110 (44 overs)	v	Victoria; 8/111 (38.5 overs)
Brooke Hepburn 23 (50); Kristen Beams 3/24 (10 overs)		Sarah Elliot 30 (98); Veronica Pyke 3/21 (10 overs)

Victoria won by 2 wickets (with 67 balls remaining)
The Gabba, Brisbane
Umpires: Claire Polosak and Jayvan Ruddick-Collins

- Victoria won the toss and elected to field.
- Points: Victoria 4, Tasmania 0.

Match 7
11 October 2015
10:00
Scorecard

South Australia; 246 (49.5 overs)	v	Western Australia (home team); 156 (43.2 overs)
Sophie Devine 56 (54); Gemma Triscari 3/36 (8.5 overs)		Nicole Bolton 71 (99); Sophie Devine 4/16 (8.2 overs)

South Australia won by 90 runs
WACA Ground, Perth
Umpires: Nathan Johnstone and Todd Rann

- South Australia won the toss and elected to bat.
- Points: South Australia 4, Western Australia 0.

Match 8
12 October 2015
10:00
Scorecard

Tasmania; 101 (45.2 overs)	v	Queensland (home team); 0/102 (15.4 overs)
Veronica Pyke 28 (66); Jess Jonassen 3/19 (9.2 overs)		Beth Mooney 49* (42); Katelyn Fryett 0/25 (4 overs)

Queensland won by 10 wickets (with 206 balls remaining)
The Gabba, Brisbane
Umpires: Claire Polosak and Wade Stewart

- Queensland won the toss and elected to field.
- Points: Queensland 4, Tasmania 0.

Match 9
12 October 2015
10:00
Scorecard

Australian Capital Territory; 6/218 (50 overs)	v	Victoria; 4/220 (43.5 overs)
Erin Osborne 48 (69); Briana Binch 2/44 (9 overs)		Meg Lanning 100* (117); Angela Reakes 2/44 (7 overs)

Victoria won by 6 wickets (with 37 balls remaining)
Allan Border Field, Brisbane
Umpires: Benjamin Farrell and Murray Branch

- Australian Capital Territory won the toss and elected to bat.
- Points: Victoria 4, Australian Capital Territory 0.

=== Round 2 ===
Match 10
31 October 2015
10:00
Scorecard

South Australia; 190 (33 overs)	v	Victoria (home team); 8/188 (33 overs)
Bridget Patterson 71 (86); Sarah Elliott 3/36 (5 overs)		Hayley Jensen 50 (60); Samantha Betts 3/39 (7 overs)

South Australia won by 2 runs
Junction Oval, Melbourne
Umpires: Ang Sammartino and Daryl Brigham
Player of the match: Bridget Patterson (South Australia)

- Victoria won the toss and elected to field.
- Points: South Australia 5, Victoria 0.

Match 11
31 October 2015
10:00
Scorecard

Western Australia; 161 (39.1 overs)	v	Australian Capital Territory; 8/166 (42.2 overs)
Nicole Bolton 44 (51); Samantha Bates 3/25 (9 overs)		Katie Mack 38 (66); Heather Graham 3/28 (9 overs)

ACT won by 2 wickets (with 46 balls remaining)
Camberwell Sports Ground, Melbourne
Umpires: David Shepard and Stephen Brne
Player of the match: Erin Osborne (Australian Capital Territory)

- Australian Capital Territory won the toss and elected to field.
- Points: Australian Capital Territory 5, Western Australia 0.

Match 12
1 November 2015
10:00
Scorecard

Western Australia; 2/301 (50 overs)	v	Victoria (home team); 7/285 (50 overs)
Elyse Villani 142 (143); Sarah Elliott 1/47 (8 overs)		Sarah Elliott 101 (126); Heather Graham 3/41 (10 overs)

Western Australia won by 16 runs
Junction Oval, Melbourne
Umpires: Ang Sammartino and D Shepherd
Player of the match: Elyse Villani (Western Australia)

- Western Australia won the toss and elected to bat.
- Points: Western Australia 4, Victoria 0.

Match 13
1 November 2015
10:00
Scorecard

Australian Capital Territory; 169 (44.5 overs)	v	South Australia; 151 (45.4 overs)
Sara Hungerford 37 (73); Amanda-Jade Wellington 4/22 (9 overs)		Sarah Taylor 42 (40); Angela Reakes 4/35 (10 overs)

ACT won by 18 runs
Camberwell Sports Ground, Melbourne
Umpires: Dale Ireland and Stephen Brne
Player of the match: Angela Reakes (Australian Capital Territory)

- Australian Capital Territory won the toss and elected to bat.
- Points: Australian Capital Territory 4, South Australia 0.

Match 14
1 November 2015
10:00
Scorecard

(home team) New South Wales; 7/277 (50 overs)	v	Queensland; 138 (42.4 overs)
Alyssa Healy 124 (138); Jess Jonassen 2/43 (8 overs)		Beth Mooney 33 (55); Laura Marsh 4/27 (10 overs)

New South Wales won by 139 runs
Hurstville Oval, Sydney
Umpires: Ben Treloar and Tony Wilds
Player of the match: Alyssa Healy (New South Wales)

- New South Wales won the toss and elected to bat.
- Points: New South Wales 5, Queensland 0.

=== Round 3 ===
Match 15
14 November 2015
14:15 (D/N)
Scorecard

New South Wales; 5/273 (50 overs)	v	Tasmania (home team); 240 (49.1 overs)
Ellyse Perry 86 (84); Julie Hunter 1/21 (10 overs)		Heather Knight 48 (76); Lauren Smith 3/10 (3.1 overs)

New South Wales won by 33 runs
Bellerive Oval, Hobart
Umpires: Muhammed Qureshi and Wade Stewart
Player of the match: Ellyse Perry (NSW)

- Tasmania won the toss and elected to field.
- Points: New South Wales 5, Tasmania 0.

Match 16
21 November 2015
10:00
Scorecard

Western Australia; 9/192 (50 overs)	v	Tasmania; 185 (48.2 overs)
Jess Cameron 51 (67); Meg Phillips 4/16 (5 overs)		Emma Thompson 50 (62); Bhavi Devchand 3/56 (10 overs)

Western Australia won by 7 runs
Park 10, Adelaide
Umpires: Cain Kemp and Craig Thomas

- Western Australia won the toss and elected to bat.
- Points: Western Australia 4, Tasmania 0.

Match 17
21 November 2015
10:00
Scorecard

Queensland; 145 (45.1 overs)	v	South Australia; 9/146 (42.1 overs)
Delissa Kimmince 34 (70); Megan Schutt 3/23 (10 overs)		Tahlia McGrath 24 (47); Delissa Kimmince 5/40 (10 overs)

South Australia won by 1 wicket (with 47 balls remaining)
Railways Oval, Adelaide
Umpires: Cory Black and Luke Uthenwoldt
Player of the match: Megan Schutt (SA)

- Queensland won the toss and elected to bat.
- Points: South Australia 4, Queensland 0.

Match 18
21 November 2015
10:00
Scorecard

New South Wales; 6/312 (50 overs)	v	Australian Capital Territory; 192 (47.4 overs)
Ellyse Perry 126 (115); Erin Osborne 2/50 (10 overs)		Rebecca Maher 58* (52); Lauren Cheatle 2/24 (8 overs)

New South Wales won by 120 runs
Manuka Oval, Canberra
Umpires: D Young and Dinusha Bandara

- New South Wales won the toss and elected to bat.
- Points: New South Wales 4, Australian Capital Territory 0.

Match 19
22 November 2015
10:00
Scorecard

(home team) South Australia; 8/191 (50 overs)	v	Tasmania; 160 (44.1 overs)
Tahlia McGrath 58 (118); Julie Hunter 3/21 (10 overs)		Erin Burns 40 (61); Sarah Coyte 2/22 (10 overs)

South Australia won by 31 runs
University Oval, Adelaide
Umpires: Cain Kemp and Luke Uthenwoldt
Player of the match: Tahlia McGrath (South Australia)

- Points: South Australia 4, Tasmania 0.

Match 20
22 November 2015
10:00
Scorecard

Queensland; 9/242 (50 overs)	v	Western Australia; 9/224 (50 overs)
Grace Harris 97 (91); Nicole Bolton 3/40 (7 overs)		Elyse Villani 79 (112); Jemma Barsby 3/42 (10 overs)

Queensland won by 18 runs
Karen Rolton Oval, Adelaide
Umpires: Cory Black and Craig Thomas
Player of the match: Grace Harris (Queensland)

- Queensland won the toss and elected to bat.
- Points: Queensland 4, Western Australia 1.

Match 21
22 November 2015
10:00
Scorecard

Victoria; 132 (45.2 overs)	v	New South Wales; 134 (25 overs)
Emma Inglis 34 (57); Sarah Aley 3/21 (7 overs)		Alyssa Healy 65* (82); Hayley Jensen 0/12 (4 overs)

New South Wales won by 10 wickets (with 150 balls remaining)
Manuka Oval, Canberra
Umpires: A Dolin and Chris Cassin
Player of the match: Sarah Aley (New South Wales)

- Victoria won the toss and elected to bat.
- Points: New South Wales 5, Victoria 0.

== Final ==
29 November 2015
10:00
Scorecard

South Australia; 7/264 (50 overs)	v	New South Wales (home team); 210 (46 overs)
Sarah Taylor 110 (106); Laura Marsh 2/41 (7 overs)		Naomi Stalenberg 58 (38); Amanda-Jade Wellington 2/34 (7 overs)

South Australia won by 54 runs
Hurstville Oval, Sydney
Umpires: Sam Nogajski and Tony Wilds
Player of the match: Sarah Taylor (South Australia)

- South Australia won the toss and elected to bat.
- South Australia won the 2015–16 Women's National Cricket League.

== Statistics ==
=== Highest totals ===
Team	Score	Against	Venue	Date
New South Wales	6/312	Australian Capital Territory	Manuka Oval, Canberra	21 November 2016
Western Australia	2/301	Victoria	Junction Oval, St Kilda	1 November 2015
Victoria	7/285	Western Australia	Junction Oval, St Kilda	1 November 2015
South Australia	5/281	New South Wales	WACA Ground, Perth	10 October 2015
New South Wales	7/280	South Australia	WACA Ground, Perth	10 October 2015

=== Most runs ===
Player	Team	Mat	Inns	NO	Runs	HS	Ave	BF	SR	100	50
Ellyse Perry	New South Wales	7	6	0	403	126	67.16	455	88.57	1	3
Nicole Bolton	Western Australia	6	6	0	383	128	63.83	484	79.13	2	1
Sarah Taylor	South Australia	7	7	0	323	110	46.14	347	93.08	2	0
Alyssa Healy	New South Wales	7	7	1	316	124	52.66	401	78.80	1	1
Meg Lanning	Victoria	6	6	2	307	100*	76.75	350	87.71	1	2

=== Most wickets ===
Player	Team	Mat	Inns	Overs	Mdns	Runs	Wkts	BBI	Ave	SR	4WI
Megan Schutt	South Australia	7	7	63.5	10	243	14	4/42	17.35	27.3	1
Amanda-Jade Wellington	South Australia	7	7	50.0	3	214	13	4/22	16.46	23.0	1
Alex Price	South Australia	7	7	44.2	3	216	12	4/28	18.00	22.1	1
Rene Farrell	New South Wales	7	7	60.4	4	257	12	3/32	21.41	30.3	0
Lauren Smith	New South Wales	6	6	42.3	3	178	11	3/10	16.18	23.1	0
