= 2016–17 Women's National Cricket League season =

Cricket tournament

Women's National Cricket League 2016–17 season
- Dates: 13 October 2016 – 3 December 2016
- Administrator: Cricket Australia
- Cricket format: Limited overs cricket (50 overs)
- Tournament format(s): Round-robin and final
- Champions: New South Wales (18th title)
- Runners-up: Queensland
- Participants: 7
- Matches: 22
- Player of the series: (Victoria (state)) Meg Lanning
- Most runs: (Victoria (state)) Meg Lanning (359)
- Most wickets: (Victoria (state)) Molly Strano (13)
- Official website: cricket.com.au

The 2016–17 Women's National Cricket League season was the 21st season of the Women's National Cricket League, the women's domestic limited overs cricket competition in Australia. The tournament started on 13 October 2016 and finished on 3 December 2016. Defending champions South Australian Scorpions finished fourth. New South Wales Breakers won the tournament for the 18th time after finishing second on the ladder and beating Queensland Fire in the final. Meg Lanning was named player of the tournament.

== Ladder ==
As of 20 November 2016

Pos	Team	Pld	W	L	T	NR	BP	Pts	NRR
1	Queensland	6	4	1	1	0	1	19	0.531
2	New South Wales	6	4	2	0	0	3	19	0.915
3	Victoria	6	4	2	0	0	2	18	0.688
4	South Australia	6	3	2	1	0	2	16	0.416
5	Australian Capital Territory	6	3	3	0	0	2	14	0.219
6	Tasmania	6	2	4	0	0	0	8	−1.805
7	Western Australia	6	0	6	0	0	0	0	−1.030

Updated to match(es) played on 20 November 2016. Source:
Rules for classification: The top two ranked teams qualified for the final.
- Points system: 4 for a win, 2 each for a tie or a no result, 0 for a loss, 1 each for an abandoned match.
- Bonus point system: 2 for win with a run rate twice that of the opposition, 1 for win with a run rate 1.25 times that of the opposition.

== Fixtures ==
=== Round 1 ===
Match 1
13 October 2016
10:00
Scorecard

South Australia; 9/215 (50 overs)	v	New South Wales; 9/216 (48.2 overs)
Amanda-Jade Wellington 37 (34); Rene Farrell 3/33 (10 overs)		Alex Blackwell 70 (113); Tahlia McGrath 3/36 (9.2 overs)

New South Wales won by 1 wicket (with 10 balls remaining)
The Gabba, Brisbane
Umpires: Steven Farrell and Andrew Crozier
Player of the match: Alex Blackwell (New South Wales)

- South Australia won the toss and elected to bat.
- Points: New South Wales 4, South Australia 0.

Match 2
13 October 2016
10:00
Scorecard

Tasmania; 151 (50 overs)	v	Queensland (home team); 4/152 (27.2 overs)
Brooke Hepburn 38 (53); Georgia Prestwidge 3/25 (7 overs)		Beth Mooney 53 (43); Brooke Hepburn 2/28 (6 overs)

Queensland won by 6 wickets (with 136 balls remaining)
Allan Border Field, Brisbane
Umpires: Murray Branch and David Taylor
Player of the match: Jess Jonassen (Queensland)

- Queensland won the toss and elected to field.
- Points: Queensland 5, Tasmania 0.

Match 3
14 October 2016
10:00
Scorecard

(home team) Queensland; 267 (50 overs)	v	South Australia; 9/267 (50 overs)
Jemma Barsby 53 (67); Amanda-Jade Wellington 3/30 (10 overs)		Charlotte Edwards 100 (107); Delissa Kimmince 3/37 (7 overs)

Match tied
Allan Border Field, Brisbane
Umpires: Murray Branch and Stephen Dionysius
Player of the match: Charlotte Edwards (South Australia)

- Queensland won the toss and elected to bat.
- Points: Queensland 2, South Australia 2.

Match 4
14 October 2016
10:00
Scorecard

New South Wales; 3/377 (50 overs)	v	Tasmania; 170 (46.5 overs)
Alyssa Healy 159 (115); Brooke Hepburn 1/67 (9 overs)		Isobel Joyce 35 (36); Ashleigh Gardner 3/31 (8.5 overs)

New South Wales won by 207 runs
The Gabba, Brisbane
Umpires: David Taylor and Craig Thomas
Player of the match: Alyssa Healy (New South Wales)

- New South Wales won the toss and elected to bat.
- Points: New South Wales 6, Tasmania 0.

Match 5
14 October 2016
10:00
Scorecard

Australian Capital Territory; 8/195 (50 overs)	v	Western Australia (home team); 170 (47.2 overs)
Kris Britt 72 (104); Natasha Farrant 3/36 (10 overs)		Heather Graham 35 (62); Samantha Bates 3/16 (9.2 overs)

ACT won by 25 runs
WACA Ground, Perth
Umpires: Trent Steenholdt and James Hewitt
Player of the match: Kris Britt (ACT)

- Western Australia won the toss and elected to field.
- Points: ACT 4, Western Australia 0.

Match 6
15 October 2016
10:00
Scorecard

Australian Capital Territory; 6/226 (50 overs)	v	Victoria; 1/227 (44.3 overs)
Angela Reakes 58* (64); Kristen Beams 2/43 (10 overs)		Meg Lanning 107 (113); Nicole Goodwin 1/31 (10 overs)

Victoria won by 9 wickets (with 33 balls remaining)
WACA Ground, Perth
Umpires: Nathan Johnstone and A Kovalevs
Player of the match: Meg Lanning (Victoria)

- Victoria won the toss and elected to field.
- Points: Victoria 4, ACT 0.

Match 7
16 October 2016
10:00
Scorecard

(home team) Queensland; 3/318 (50 overs)	v	New South Wales; 5/264 (50 overs)
Delissa Kimmince 93* (62); Lauren Smith 1/44 (6 overs)		Alex Blackwell 113 (117); Jess Jonassen 2/40 (10 overs)

Queensland won by 54 runs
The Gabba, Brisbane
Umpires: Murray Branch and T Penman
Player of the match: Grace Harris (Queensland)

- Queensland won the toss and elected to bat.
- Points: Queensland 4, New South Wales 0.

Match 8
16 October 2016
10:00
Scorecard

South Australia; 241 (50 overs)	v	Tasmania; 190 (46.4 overs)
Charlotte Edwards 57 (68); Brooke Hepburn 5/39 (9 overs)		Erin Burns 45 (56); Alex Price 3/29 (10 overs)

South Australia won by 51 runs
Allan Border Field, Brisbane
Umpires: Steven Farrell and Stephen Dionysius
Player of the match: Brooke Hepburn (Tasmania)

- South Australia won the toss and elected to bat.
- Points: South Australia 4, Tasmania 0.

Match 9
16 October 2016
10:00
Scorecard

(home team) Western Australia; 151 (44.5 overs)	v	Victoria; 3/155 (28.3 overs)
Elyse Villani 81 (95); Sophie Molineux 3/41 (10 overs)		Meg Lanning 60 (59); Emma Biss 1/4 (3 overs)

Victoria won by 7 wickets (with 129 balls remaining)
WACA Ground, Perth
Umpires: Todd Rann and Hennie Botes
Player of the match: Meg Lanning (Victoria)

- Victoria won the toss and elected to field.
- Points: Victoria 5, Western Australia 0.

=== Round 2 ===
Match 10
28 October 2016
10:00
Scorecard

South Australia; 7/217 (50 overs)	v	Victoria; 155 (48.5 overs)
Tegan McPharlin 46 (68); Makinley Blows 2/7 (3 overs)		Emma Inglis 36 (50); Alex Price 3/38 (10 overs)

South Australia won by 62 runs
Lindisfarne Oval, Hobart
Umpires: Harvey Wolff and G Beechey
Player of the match: Sarah Coyte (South Australia)

- Victoria won the toss and elected to field.
- Points: South Australia 5, Victoria 0.

Match 11
28 October 2016
14:15 (D/N)
Scorecard

Australian Capital Territory; 245 (50 overs)	v	Tasmania (home team); 6/246 (50 overs)
Kris Britt 64 (97); Veronica Pyke 3/36 (10 overs)		Georgia Redmayne 114* (147); Nicole Goodwin 3/41 (10 overs)

Tasmania won by 4 wickets (with 0 balls remaining)
Bellerive Oval, Hobart
Umpires: Darren Close and W Braid
Player of the match: Georgia Redmayne (Tasmania)

- Tasmania won the toss and elected to field.
- Points: Tasmania 4, ACT 0.

Match 12
29 October 2016
10:00
Scorecard

(home team) New South Wales; 7/250 (50 overs)	v	Western Australia; 143 (43.3 overs)
Ellyse Perry 103 (120); Emma King 2/38 (10 overs)		Heather Graham 57 (74); Rene Farrell 3/20 (9 overs)

New South Wales won by 107 runs
Blacktown International Sportspark, Sydney
Umpires: G Stubbings and Marc Nickl
Player of the match: Ellyse Perry (New South Wales)

- New South Wales won the toss and elected to bat.
- Points: New South Wales 5, Western Australia 0.

Match 13
29 October 2016
14:15 (D/N)
Scorecard

Victoria; 3/320 (50 overs)	v	Tasmania (home team); 163 (40.4 overs)
Meg Lanning 190 (153); Katelyn Fryett 1/50 (10 overs)		Corinne Hall 47 (53); Alana King 4/28 (6 overs)

Victoria won by 157 runs
Bellerive Oval, Hobart
Umpires: Muhammad Qureshi and Darren Close
Player of the match: Meg Lanning (Victoria)

- Victoria won the toss and elected to bat.
- Points: Victoria 5, Tasmania 0.

Match 14
30 October 2016
10:00
Scorecard

Queensland; 7/264 (50 overs)	v	Western Australia; 9/258 (50 overs)
Kirby Short 64 (103); Tash Farrant 3/59 (10 overs)		Heather Graham 73 (85); Holly Ferling 3/34 (10 overs)

Queensland won by 6 runs
Blacktown International Sportspark, Sydney
Umpires: Troy Penman and Marc Nickl
Player of the match: Holly Ferling (Queensland)

- Queensland won the toss and elected to bat.
- Points: Queensland 4, Western Australia 0.

Match 15
30 October 2016
14:15 (D/N)
Scorecard

(home team) Australian Capital Territory; 133 (39 overs)	v	South Australia; 100 (33.5 overs)
Angela Reakes 37 (54); Amanda-Jade Wellington 3/36 (9 overs)		Bridget Patterson 24 (27); Erin Osborne 4/24 (10 overs)

ACT won by 33 runs (D/L method)
Manuka Oval, Canberra
Umpires: Yohan Ramasundara and D Young
Player of the match: Erin Osborne (ACT)

- ACT won the toss and elected to bat.
- Points: ACT 5, South Australia 0.

=== Round 3 ===
Match 16
18 November 2016
10:00
Scorecard

New South Wales; 193 (45 overs)	v	Victoria; 7/194 (48.2 overs)
Naomi Stalenberg 63 (53); Alana King 4/20 (6 overs)		Sarah Elliott 53 (103); Maisy Gibson 1/20 (4 overs)

Victoria won by 3 wickets (with 10 balls remaining)
Casey Fields No. 4, Melbourne
Umpires: Dale Ireland and David Shepard
Player of the match: Emma Kearney (Victoria)

- New South Wales won the toss and elected to bat.
- Points: Victoria 4, New South Wales 0.

Match 17
18 November 2016
10:00
Scorecard

Queensland; 9/211 (50 overs)	v	Australian Capital Territory; 4/213 (39.5 overs)
Jemma Barsby 56 (104); Nicole Goodwin 3/34 (10 overs)		Katie Mack 73 (108); Haidee Birkett 2/36 (6.5 overs)

ACT won by 6 wickets (with 61 balls remaining)
Jubilee Park, Melbourne
Umpires: Daryl Brigham and Stephen Brne
Player of the match: Katie Mack (ACT)

- Queensland won the toss and elected to bat.
- Points: ACT 4, Queensland 0.

Match 18
19 November 2016
10:00
Scorecard

Queensland; 7/251 (50 overs)	v	Victoria; 8/222 (50 overs)
Beth Mooney 146 (144); Molly Strano 4/44 (10 overs)		Sophie Molineux 55 (90); Jemma Barsby 2/37 (10 overs)

Queensland won by 29 runs
Casey Fields No. 4, Melbourne
Umpires: David Shepard and Daryl Brigham
Player of the match: Beth Mooney (Queensland)

- Queensland won the toss and elected to bat.
- Points: Queensland 4, Victoria 0.

Match 19
19 November 2016
10:00
Scorecard

(home team) South Australia; 6/267 (50 overs)	v	Western Australia; 5/215 (50 overs)
Charlotte Edwards 104 (114); Piepa Cleary 4/50 (10 overs)		Taneale Peschel 50* (75); Alex Price 2/37 (10 overs)

South Australia won by 52 runs
Woodville Oval, Adelaide
Umpires: Cain Kemp and Craig Thomas
Player of the match: Charlotte Edwards (South Australia)

- South Australia won the toss and elected to bat.
- Points: South Australia 4, Western Australia 0.

Match 20
20 November 2016
10:00
Scorecard

(home team) New South Wales; 8/201 (50 overs)	v	Australian Capital Territory; 188 (39.3 overs)
Rachael Haynes 55 (74); Erin Osborne 2/33 (10 overs)		Erin Osborne 78 (100); Sarah Aley 3/33 (9 overs)

New South Wales won by 13 runs
Blacktown International Sportspark, Sydney
Umpires: Marc Nickl and another
Player of the match: Angela Reakes (ACT)

- New South Wales won the toss and elected to bat.
- Points: New South Wales 4, Australian Capital Territory 1.

Match 21
20 November 2016
10:00
Scorecard

Western Australia; 8/275 (50 overs)	v	Tasmania; 163 (40.4 overs)
Chloe Piparo 119 (140); Katelyn Fryett 2/45 (10 overs)		Georgia Redmayne 116 (119); Emma Biss 3/50 (10 overs)

Tasmania won by 6 wickets (with 6 balls remaining)
Woodville Oval, Adelaide
Umpires: Craig Thomas and Luke Uthenwoldt
Player of the match: Georgia Redmayne (Tasmania)

- Western Australia won the toss and elected to bat.
- Points: Tasmania 4, Western Australia 0.

== Final ==
3 December 2016
10:00
Scorecard

(home team) Queensland; 119 (41.1 overs)	v	New South Wales; 1/123 (24 overs)
Jemma Barsby 30 (57); Rene Farrell 3/20 (7 overs)		Alyssa Healy 56* (69); Grace Harris 1/8 (2 overs)

New South Wales won by 9 wickets (with 156 balls remaining)
Allan Border Field, Brisbane
Umpires: Michael Graham-Smith and Claire Polosak
Player of the match: Rene Farrell (New South Wales)

- Queensland won the toss and elected to bat.
- New South Wales won the 2016–17 Women's National Cricket League.

== Statistics ==
=== Highest totals ===
Team	Score	Against	Venue	Date
New South Wales	3/377	Tasmania	Brisbane Cricket Ground	14 October 2016
Victoria	3/320	Tasmania	Bellerive Oval	29 October 2016
Queensland	3/318	New South Wales	Brisbane Cricket Ground	16 October 2016
Tasmania	4/276	Western Australia	Woodville Oval, Adelaide	20 November 2016
Western Australia	8/275	Tasmania	Woodville Oval, Adelaide	20 November 2016

=== Most runs ===
Player	Team	Mat	Inns	NO	Runs	HS	Ave	BF	SR	100	50
Meg Lanning	Victoria	4	4	1	359	190	119.66	336	106.84	2	1
Beth Mooney	Queensland	7	7	0	325	146	46.42	353	92.06	1	1
Alex Blackwell	New South Wales	5	5	2	318	113*	106.00	365	87.12	1	2
Charlotte Edwards	South Australia	6	6	0	312	104	52.00	394	79.18	2	1
Georgia Redmayne	Tasmania	6	6	1	295	116	59.00	376	78.45	2	0

=== Most wickets ===
Player	Team	Mat	Inns	Overs	Mdns	Runs	Wkts	BBI	Ave	SR	4WI
Molly Strano	Victoria	6	6	54.3	5	210	13	4/44	16.15	25.1	1
Amanda-Jade Wellington	South Australia	6	6	58.0	5	229	13	3/30	17.61	26.7	0
Brooke Hepburn	Tasmania	6	6	54.0	1	310	13	5/39	23.84	24.9	1
Nicole Goodwin	Australian Capital Territory	6	6	48.5	7	171	12	3/12	14.25	24.4	0
Sarah Aley	New South Wales	7	7	58.3	4	225	11	3/31	20.45	31.9	0
