= 2015–16 Women's Big Bash League season =

2015–16 Women's Big Bash League
- Logo of the 2015–16 Women's Big Bash League season
- Dates: 5 December 2015 – 24 January 2016
- Administrator: Cricket Australia
- Cricket format: Twenty20
- Tournament format(s): Double round robin and knockout finals
- Champions: Sydney Thunder (1st title)
- Participants: 8
- Matches: 59
- Player of the series: Meg Lanning (MLS)
- Most runs: Meg Lanning (MLS) – 560
- Most wickets: Rene Farrell (SYT) – 26
- Official website: bigbash.com.au/wbbl

The 2015–16 Women's Big Bash League season or WBBL|01 was the first season of the Women's Big Bash League (WBBL), the semi-professional women's Twenty20 domestic cricket competition in Australia. The tournament ran from 5 December 2015 to 24 January 2016.

In the final at the Melbourne Cricket Ground, the Sydney Thunder defeated cross-town rivals, the Sydney Sixers, to win the inaugural championship title. Thunder all-rounder Erin Osborne managed bowling figures of 3/21 in the decider and was named Player of the Final.

Melbourne Stars captain Meg Lanning was the leading run-scorer of WBBL|01 and was consequently named Player of the Tournament, although her team narrowly missed out on qualifying for finals. Sydney Thunder medium-pace bowler Rene Farrell was the tournament's leading wicket-taker.

== Teams ==
Teams were aligned with franchises in the men's Big Bash League and each squad consisted of 14 players, with an allowance of up to five marquee signings including a maximum of three from overseas. Australian marquees were defined as players who made at least ten limited-overs appearances for the national team between 1 July 2012 and 1 July 2015.

Team	Home ground (Note: Number of games hosted at each venue is indicated in brackets)	Secondary grounds	Coach	Captain	Australian representatives (Note: Only includes players who debuted for Australia before the tournament)	Overseas marquee players (Note: Englishwoman Nicky Shaw was classed as a local player when signing for the Scorchers due to her permanent residence in Australia and having made a lack of recent international cricket appearances)
Adelaide Strikers	Adelaide Oval No. 2 (3)	Adelaide Oval (2)	Andrea McCauley	Lauren Ebsary	Sarah Coyte; Megan Schutt; Lauren Ebsary (Note: Did not qualify as a marquee player); Shelley Nitschke	Sophie Devine; Stacy-Ann King; Sarah Taylor
Brisbane Heat	The Gabba (4)	Allan Border Field (1)	Andy Richards	Delissa Kimmince	Holly Ferling; Jodie Fields; Jess Jonassen; Grace Harris; Delissa Kimmince; Megan White	Kate Cross; Lauren Winfield
Hobart Hurricanes	Aurora Stadium (4)	Blundstone Arena (2); Kingston Twin Ovals (2)	Julia Price	Heather Knight	Julie Hunter	Heather Knight; Hayley Matthews; Amy Satterthwaite
Melbourne Renegades	Junction Oval (2)	Etihad Stadium (1)	Lachlan Stevens	Sarah Elliott	Kris Britt; Sarah Elliott	Rachel Priest; Dane van Niekerk; Danielle Wyatt; Shabnim Ismail (Note: Replacement player)
Melbourne Stars	Junction Oval (4)	Melbourne Cricket Ground (2)	David Hemp	Meg Lanning	Kristen Beams; Meg Lanning	Mignon du Preez; Morna Nielsen; Nat Sciver; Hayley Jensen
Perth Scorchers	WACA Ground (5)	Aquinas College (2)	Lisa Keightley	Nicole Bolton	Nicole Bolton; Elyse Villani	Suzie Bates; Katherine Brunt; Charlotte Edwards; Deandra Dottin
Sydney Sixers	Sydney Cricket Ground (2)	Drummoyne Oval (2); Hurstville Oval (1); Waverley Oval (1)	Ben Sawyer	Ellyse Perry	Alyssa Healy; Ellyse Perry; Lisa Sthalekar	Laura Marsh; Marizanne Kapp; Sara McGlashan
Sydney Thunder	Sydney Showground Stadium (1)	Howell Oval (1); University Oval No.1 (1)	Joanne Broadbent	Alex Blackwell	Alex Blackwell; Rene Farrell; Rachael Haynes; Erin Osborne	Stafanie Taylor

== Standings ==
=== Points table ===
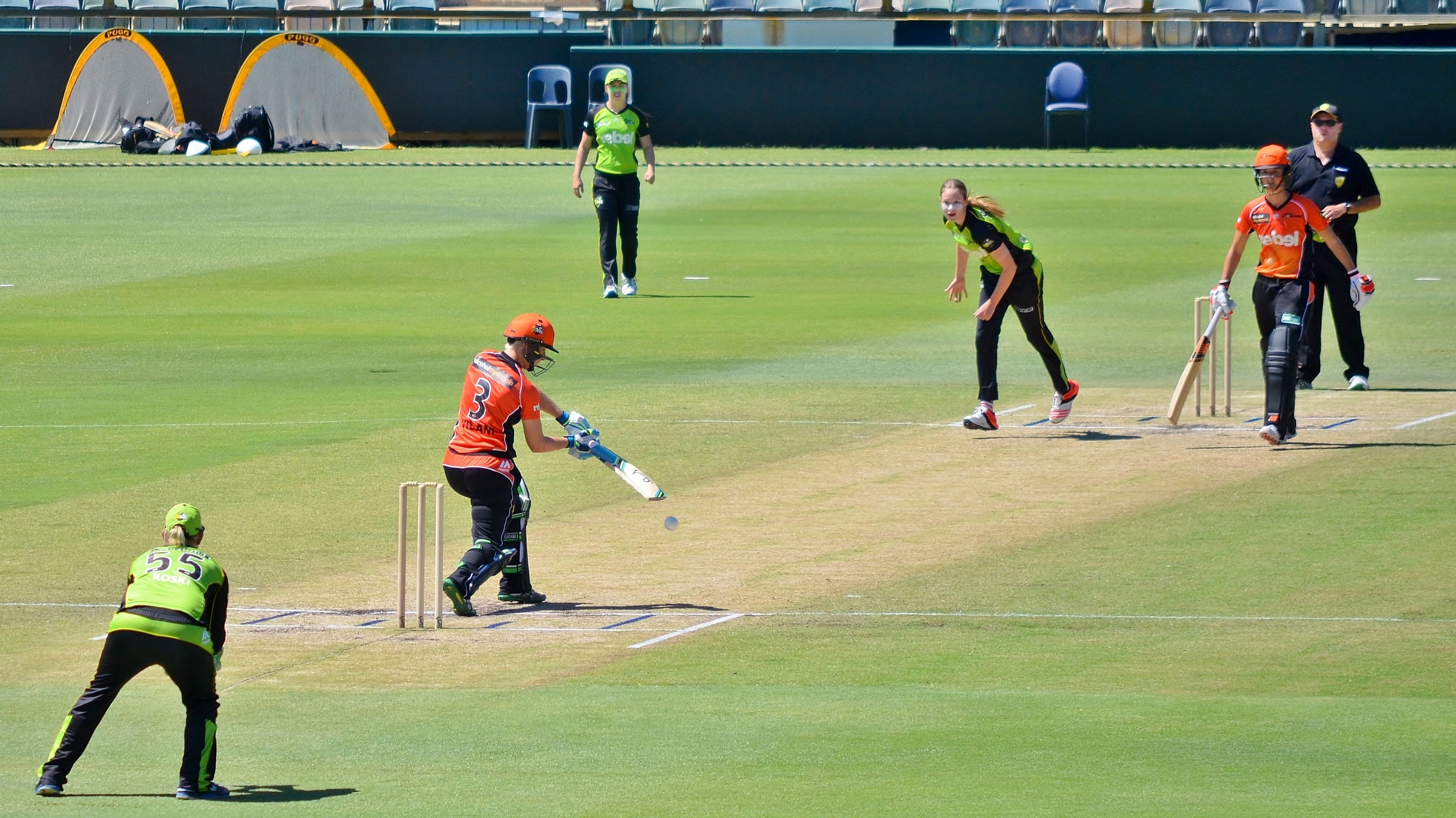
Lauren Cheatle of Sydney Thunder bowls to Elyse Villani of Perth Scorchers during the Scorchers v Thunder match at the WACA Ground, Perth, on 28 December 2015. The other batter is Charlotte Edwards, and the wicket-keeper is Claire Koski.

Pos	Team	Pld	W	L	NR	Pts	NRR
1	Sydney Thunder (C)	14	9	5	0	18	0.358
2	Hobart Hurricanes	14	8	6	0	16	0.190
3	Sydney Sixers (RU)	14	8	6	0	16	−0.070
4	Perth Scorchers	14	7	7	0	14	0.166
5	Melbourne Stars	14	7	7	0	14	0.034
6	Brisbane Heat	14	7	7	0	14	−0.094
7	Adelaide Strikers	14	6	8	0	12	−0.131
8	Melbourne Renegades	14	4	10	0	8	−0.463

- The top four teams qualified for the play-off phase.

=== Win–loss table ===
Below is a summary of results for each team's fourteen regular season matches, plus finals where applicable, in chronological order. A team's opponent for any given match is listed above the margin of victory/defeat.

Team	1	2	3	4	5	6	7	8	9	10	11	12	13	14	SF	F	Pos.
Adelaide Strikers (ADS)	HBH; 2 runs	HBH; 9 wkts	SYT; 18 runs	BRH; 8 wkts	SYT; 6 wkts	PRS; 35 runs	PRS; 6 wkts	MLS; 19 runs	SYS; 23 runs	SYS; 36 runs	MLS; 50 runs	MLR; S/O	BRH; 6 runs	MLR; 15 runs	X	X	7th
Brisbane Heat (BRH)	MLS; 20 runs	MLS; 10 runs	PRS; 2 runs	SYS; 35 runs	SYS; 9 wkts	PRS; 5 wkts	MLR; 27 runs	ADS; 8 wkts	MLR; 7 wkts	SYT; 14 runs	HBH; 33 runs	SYT; 5 wkts	HBH; 6 wkts	ADS; 6 runs	X	X	6th
Hobart Hurricanes (HBH)	MLR; 35 runs	MLR; 4 runs	ADS; 2 runs	ADS; 9 wkts	PRS; 1 run	PRS; 4 wkts	MLS; 30 runs	BRH; 33 runs	SYT; 8 runs	SYT; 26 runs	BRH; 6 wkts	SYS; 25 runs	MLS; 6 wkts	SYS; 2 wkts	SYS; 10 wkts	X	2nd (SF)
Melbourne Renegades (MLR)	HBH; 35 runs	HBH; 4 runs	BRH; 27 runs	SYT; 6 wkts	BRH; 7 wkts	MLS; 5 wkts	MLS; 8 runs	SYS; 25 runs	SYT; 36 runs	SYS; 8 wkts	ADS; S/O	PRS; 9 wkts	ADS; 15 runs	PRS; 9 wkts	X	X	8th
Melbourne Stars (MLS)	BRH; 20 runs	BRH; 10 runs	SYS; 9 wkts	SYS; 7 wkts	HBH; 30 runs	PRS; 6 wkts	PRS; 8 wkts	MLR; 5 wkts	MLR; 8 runs	ADS; 19 runs	ADS; 50 runs	SYT; 14 runs	HBH; 6 wkts	SYT; 6 runs	X	X	5th
Perth Scorchers (PRS)	BRH; 2 runs	SYS; 9 wkts	BRH; 5 wkts	HBH; 1 run	HBH; 4 wkts	SYS; 5 wkts	MLS; 6 wkts	MLS; 8 wkts	SYT; 22 runs	SYT; 8 wkts	ADS; 35 runs	ADS; 6 wkts	MLR; 9 wkts	MLR; 9 wkts	SYT; 8 runs	X	4th (SF)
Sydney Sixers (SYS)	SYT; 9 wkts	PRS; 9 wkts	BRH; 35 runs	BRH; 9 wkts	MLS; 9 wkts	MLS; 7 wkts	PRS; 5 wkts	MLR; 25 runs	ADS; 23 runs	ADS; 36 runs	MLR; 8 wkts	HBH; 25 runs	SYT; 21 runs	HBH; 2 wkts	HBH; 10 wkts	SYT; 3 wkts	3rd (RU)
Sydney Thunder (SYT)	SYS; 9 wkts	ADS; 18 runs	MLR; 6 wkts	ADS; 6 wkts	BRH; 14 runs	PRS; 22 runs	PRS; 8 wkts	BRH; 5 wkts	HBH; 8 runs	HBH; 26 runs	MLR; 36 runs	MLS; 14 runs	SYS; 21 runs	PRS; 6 runs	PRS; 8 runs	SYS; 3 wkts	1st (C)

Team's results→	Won	Tied	Lost	N/R

== Fixtures ==
The format of the group stage was a double round-robin tournament. Several matches were scheduled at neutral venues with as many as five teams playing multiple matches in one city on the same weekend. There were 8 double-header regular season fixtures with the men's Big Bash League, as well as the semi-finals and final.

=== Weekend 1 ===
Match 1
5 December
10:00
Scorecard

Melbourne Stars; 7/156 (20 overs)	v	Brisbane Heat; 136 (19.4 overs)
Meg Lanning 90 (58); Delissa Kimmince 3/25 (4 overs)		Grace Harris 42 (21); Kristen Beams 3/20 (4 overs)

Melbourne Stars won by 20 runs
Junction Oval, Melbourne
Attendance: 1,500
Umpires: AJ Sammartino, D Brigham
Player of the match: Meg Lanning (Stars)

- Melbourne Stars won the toss and elected to bat

Match 2
5 December
14:30
Scorecard

Melbourne Stars; 4/147 (20 overs)	v	Brisbane Heat; 7/137 (20 overs)
Meg Lanning 75* (56); Jemma Barsby 1/17 (4 overs)		Jess Jonassen 52* (48); Kristen Beams 2/24 (4 overs)

Melbourne Stars won by 10 runs
Junction Oval, Melbourne
Attendance: 1,500
Umpires: AJ Sammartino, D Brigham
Player of the match: Meg Lanning (Stars)

- Melbourne Stars won the toss and elected to bat

Match 3
6 December
14:30
Scorecard

Sydney Sixers; 9/101 (20 overs)	v	Sydney Thunder; 1/103 (13.2 overs)
Marizanne Kapp 21 (28); Lauren Cheatle 4/20 (4 overs)		Stafanie Taylor 59* (38); Marizanne Kapp 1/7 (3 overs)

Sydney Thunder won by 9 wickets (with 40 balls remaining)
Howell Oval, Sydney
Attendance: 1,000
Umpires: K Knight, M Nickl
Player of the match: Stafanie Taylor (Thunder)

- Sydney Sixers won the toss and elected to bat

=== Weekend 2 ===
Match 4
11 December
10:00
Scorecard

Perth Scorchers; 9/106 (20 overs)	v	Brisbane Heat; 104 (20 overs)
Nicole Bolton 19 (18); Holly Ferling 4/8 (3 overs)		Bethany Mooney 22 (35); Katherine Brunt 4/17 (4 overs)

Perth Scorchers won by 2 runs
Aquinas College, Perth
Umpires: W Barron, H Botes
Player of the match: Katherine Brunt (Scorchers)

- Perth Scorchers won the toss and elected to bat
- Played as double header with Perth Scorchers exhibition game

Match 5
11 December
19:00 (D/N)
Scorecard

Hobart Hurricanes; 5/121 (20 overs)	v	Melbourne Renegades; 86 (18 overs)
Amy Satterthwaite 36 (35); Nicola Hancock 1/13 (2 overs)		Sarah Elliot 27 (33); Veronica Pyke 2/12 (4 overs)

Hobart Hurricanes won by 35 runs
Aurora Stadium, Launceston
Umpires: D Close, H Wolff
Player of the match: Corinne Hall (Hurricanes)

- Hobart Hurricanes won the toss and elected to bat
- Sophie Molineux (Melbourne Renegades) made her women's Twenty20 debut

Match 6
12 December
10:00
Scorecard

Sydney Sixers; 81 (18.4 overs)	v	Perth Scorchers; 1/82 (13.1 overs)
Sarah Aley 29 (28); Heather Graham 3/19 (3.4 overs)		Charlotte Edwards 39* (40); Laura Marsh 1/19 (3 overs)

Perth Scorchers won by 9 wickets (with 41 balls remaining)
Aquinas College, Perth
Umpires: T Rann, J Hewitt
Player of the match: Charlotte Edwards (Scorchers)

- Sydney Sixers won the toss and elected to bat

Match 7
12 December
13:30
Scorecard

Hobart Hurricanes; 7/125 (20 overs)	v	Melbourne Renegades; 7/121 (20 overs)
Heather Knight 38 (38); Jenny Taffs 1/6 (1 over)		Dane van Niekerk 45 (44); Veronica Pyke 3/19 (4 overs)

Hobart Hurricanes won by 4 runs
Aurora Stadium, Launceston
Umpires: D Close, M Qureshi
Player of the match: Veronica Pyke (Hurricanes)

- Hobart Hurricanes won the toss and elected to bat

Match 8
12 December
14:30
Scorecard

Brisbane Heat; 3/190 (20 overs)	v	Sydney Sixers; 7/155 (20 overs)
Grace Harris 103 (55); Laura Marsh 3/17 (3 overs)		Sara McGlashan 61 (29); Grace Harris 4/15 (2 overs)

Brisbane Heat won by 35 runs
Aquinas College, Perth
Umpires: W Barron, T Steenholdt
Player of the match: Grace Harris (Heat)

- Brisbane Heat won the toss and elected to bat
- Grace Harris scored the first WBBL century

Match 9
12 December
18:00 (D/N)
Scorecard

Hobart Hurricanes; 7/117 (20 overs)	v	Adelaide Strikers; 6/115 (20 overs)
Heather Knight 50 (49); Megan Schutt 3/8 (4 overs)		Bridget Patterson 37 (44); Amy Satterthwaite 2/23 (4 overs)

Hobart Hurricanes won by 2 runs
Aurora Stadium, Launceston
Umpires: D Close, H Wolff
Player of the match: Heather Knight (Hurricanes)

- Hobart Hurricanes won the toss and elected to bat

Match 10
13 December
11:00
Scorecard

Adelaide Strikers; 83 (18.5 overs)	v	Hobart Hurricanes; 1/84 (16.2 overs)
Sophie Devine 15 (20); Julie Hunter 3/12 (4 overs)		Erin Burns 29 (43); Tahlia McGrath 1/17 (4 overs)

Hobart Hurricanes won by 9 wickets (with 22 balls remaining)
Aurora Stadium, Launceston
Umpires: D Close, M Qureshi
Player of the match: Julie Hunter (Hurricanes)

- Adelaide Strikers won the toss and elected to bat

Match 11
13 December
9:30
Scorecard

Sydney Sixers; 7/114 (20 overs)	v	Brisbane Heat; 1/115 (18 overs)
Lisa Sthalekar 31 (35); Grace Harris 3/22 (4 overs)		Beth Mooney 50* (54); Angela Reakes 1/24 (4 overs)

Brisbane Heat won by 9 wickets (with 12 balls remaining)
Aquinas College, Perth
Umpires: H Botes, N Johnstone
Player of the match: Grace Harris (Heat)

- Sydney Sixers won the toss and elected to bat

Match 12
13 December
14:30
Scorecard

Perth Scorchers; 8/119 (20 overs)	v	Brisbane Heat; 5/122 (19.1 overs)
Suzie Bates 47 (45); Holly Ferling 2/17 (4 overs)		Lauren Winfield 48* (41); Suzie Bates 2/24 (3.1 overs)

Brisbane Heat won by 5 wickets (with 5 balls remaining)
WACA Ground, Perth
Umpires: T Rann, J Taylor
Player of the match: Lauren Winfield (Heat)

- Perth Scorchers won the toss and elected to bat

=== Weekend 3 ===
Match 13
18 December
10:00
Scorecard

Brisbane Heat; 4/151 (20 overs)	v	Melbourne Renegades; 124 (19.5 overs)
Beth Mooney 64 (51); Danielle Wyatt 2/21 (4 overs)		Sarah Elliott 49 (37); Delissa Kimmince 3/23 (3 overs)

Brisbane Heat won by 27 runs
Allan Border Field, Brisbane
Umpires: M Brnch, J Ruddick-Collins
Player of the match: Beth Mooney (Heat)

- Brisbane Heat won the toss and elected to bat

Match 14
18 December
14:30
Scorecard

Sydney Sixers; 9/101 (20 overs)	v	Melbourne Stars; 1/104 (16.1 overs)
Ellyse Perry 45 (51); Kristen Beams 4/11 (4 overs)		Meg Lanning 58 (50); Ellyse Perry 1/10 (3 overs)

Melbourne Stars won by 9 wickets (with 23 balls remaining)
Drummoyne Oval, Sydney
Umpires: D Taylor, B Treloar
Player of the match: Meg Lanning (Stars)

- Sydney Sixers won the toss and elected to bat

Match 15
18 December
14:00
Scorecard

Sydney Thunder; 5/121 (20 overs)	v	Adelaide Strikers; 9/103 (20 overs)
Alex Blackwell 44* (42); Amanda Wellington 1/17 (4 overs)		Sophie Devine 29 (31); Rene Farrell 3/23 (4 overs)

Sydney Thunder won by 18 runs
Allan Border Field, Brisbane
Umpires: B Farrell, D Koch
Player of the match: Rene Farrell (Thunder)

- Sydney Thunder won the toss and elected to bat

Match 16
19 December
10:00
Scorecard

Hobart Hurricanes; 6/133 (20 overs)	v	Perth Scorchers; 7/132 (20 overs)
Heather Knight 74 (59); Nicole Bolton 3/24 (4 overs)		Nicole Bolton 45 (47); Veronica Pyke 2/23 (4 overs)

Hobart Hurricanes won by 1 run
Blacktown International Sportspark, Sydney
Umpires: K Knight, D Taylor
Player of the match: Heather Knight (Hurricanes)

- Hobart Hurricanes won the toss and elected to bat
- Nicole Bolton took the first WBBL hat-trick

Match 17
19 December
10:00
Scorecard

Melbourne Renegades; 9/128 (20 overs)	v	Sydney Thunder; 4/130 (19.3 overs)
Rachel Priest 47 (39); Lauren Cheatle 3/28 (4 overs)		Stafanie Taylor 35 (27); Briana Binch 1/15 (3 overs)

Sydney Thunder won by 6 wickets (with 3 balls remaining)
Allan Border Field, Brisbane
Umpires: M Branch, B Farrell
Player of the match: Lauren Cheatle (Thunder)

- Melbourne Renegades won the toss and elected to bat

Match 18
19 December
14:30
Scorecard

Sydney Sixers; 9/80 (20 overs)	v	Melbourne Stars; 3/81 (15.5 overs)
Ellyse Perry 28 (48); Morna Nielsen 3/12 (4 overs)		Meg Lanning 37* (38); Laura Marsh 2/20 (3 overs)

Melbourne Stars won by 7 wickets (with 25 balls remaining)
Drummoyne Oval, Sydney
Umpires: A Hobson, B Treloar
Player of the match: Meg Lanning (Stars)

- Sydney Sixers won the toss and elected to bat

Match 19
19 December
14:30
Scorecard

Hobart Hurricanes; 8/109 (20 overs)	v	Perth Scorchers; 6/110 (19 overs)
Corinne Hall 53* (44); Katie-Jane Hartshorn 4/34 (4 overs)		Suzie Bates 42* (34); Erin Burns 2/22 (4 overs)

Perth Scorchers won by 4 wickets (with 6 balls remaining)
Blacktown International Sportspark, Sydney
Umpires: M Nickl, M Wilds
Player of the match: Katie-Jane Hartshorn (Scorchers)

- Hobart Hurricanes won the toss and elected to bat

Match 20
19 December
13:40
Scorecard

Adelaide Strikers; 9/125 (20 overs)	v	Brisbane Heat; 2/128 (19 overs)
Sarah Taylor 37 (33); Jess Jonassen 3/11 (4 overs)		Jess Jonassen 67* (52); Sarah Coyte 1/19 (3 overs)

Brisbane Heat won by 8 wickets (with 6 balls remaining)
The Gabba, Brisbane
Umpires: D Koch, D Measley
Player of the match: Jess Jonassen (Heat)

- Adelaide Strikers won the toss and elected to bat
- Double header with men's BBL match

Match 21
20 December
10:00
Scorecard

Hobart Hurricanes; 6/144 (20 overs)	v	Melbourne Stars; 114 (19.2 overs)
Hayley Matthews 77 (51); Morna Nielsen 3/28 (4 overs)		Katie Mack 34 (32); Amy Satterthwaite 2/13 (3.2 overs)

Hobart Hurricanes won by 30 runs
Blacktown International Sportspark, Sydney
Umpires: KA Knight, D Taylor
Player of the match: Hayley Matthews (Hurricanes)

- Hobart Hurricanes won the toss and elected to bat

Match 22
20 December
10:00
Scorecard

Brisbane Heat; 110 (19.1 overs)	v	Melbourne Renegades; 3/112 (16.5 overs)
Beth Mooney 50 (38); Danielle Wyatt 4/13 (4 overs)		Rachel Priest 29 (34); Delissa Kimmince 3/19 (3.5 overs)

Melbourne Renegades won by 7 wickets (with 19 balls remaining)
The Gabba, Brisbane
Umpires: MS Branch, BR Farrell
Player of the match: Danielle Wyatt (Renegades)

- Brisbane Heat won the toss and elected to bat

Match 23
20 December
10:00
Scorecard

Sydney Thunder; 6/148 (20 overs)	v	Adelaide Strikers; 4/149 (19 overs)
Naomi Stalenberg 39 (19); Hannah Perry 3/21 (4)		Sarah Taylor 71 (47); Rene Farrell 1/24 (4 overs); Stafanie Taylor 1/24 (4 overs)

Adelaide Strikers won by 6 wickets (with 6 balls remaining)
Allan Border Field, Brisbane
Umpires: SJ Farrell, DM Koch
Player of the match: Sarah Taylor (Strikers)

- Sydney Thunder won the toss and elected to bat

Match 24
20 December
11:40
Scorecard

Perth Scorchers; 8/107 (20 overs)	v	Sydney Sixers; 5/108 (18.5 overs)
Suzie Bates 51 (47); Marizanne Kapp 3/9 (4 overs)		Ellyse Perry 32 (43); Katie-Jane Hartshorn 1/9 (4 overs)

Sydney Sixers won by 5 wickets (with 7 balls remaining)
Sydney Cricket Ground
Attendance: 2,000
Umpires: A Hobson, CA Polosak
Player of the match: Marizanne Kapp (Sixers)

- Sydney Sixers won the toss and elected to field
- Double header with men's BBL match

Match 25
20 December
14:30
Scorecard

Brisbane Heat; 8/141 (20 overs)	v	Sydney Thunder; 9/127 (20 overs)
Jess Jonassen 47 (44); Rene Farrell 2/26 (4 overs)		Stafanie Taylor 43 (47); Holly Ferling 3/21 (4 overs)

Brisbane Heat won by 14 runs
The Gabba, Brisbane
Umpires: DB Mealey, J Ruddick-Collins
Player of the match: Holly Ferling (Heat)

- Brisbane Heat won the toss and elected to bat

=== Weekend 4 ===
Match 26
26 December
11:15
Scorecard

Melbourne Stars; 6/102 (20 overs)	v	Perth Scorchers; 4/103 (19.2 overs)
Katie Mack 32 (30); Katherine Brunt 2/11 (4 overs)		Charlotte Edwards 61 (56); Natalie Sciver 2/16 (4 overs)

Perth Scorchers won by 6 wickets (with 4 balls remaining)
WACA Ground, Perth
Umpires: TR Rann, T Steenholdt
Player of the match: Charlotte Edwards (Scorchers)

- Melbourne Stars won the toss and elected to bat
- Double header with men's BBL match

Match 27
27 December
10:00
Scorecard

Melbourne Stars; 6/127 (20 overs)	v	Perth Scorchers; 2/130 (17.1 overs)
Emma Inglis 42 (30); Nicky Shaw 2/26 (4 overs)		Charlotte Edwards 61 (50); Hayley Jensen 2/14 (3 overs)

Perth Scorchers won by 8 wickets (with 17 balls remaining)
WACA Ground, Perth
Umpires: H Botes, J Hewitt
Player of the match: Elyse Villani (Scorchers)

- Perth Scorchers won the toss and elected to field

Match 28
27 December
14:30
Scorecard

Sydney Thunder; 3/139 (20 overs)	v	Perth Scorchers; 117 (19.1 overs)
Stafanie Taylor 59 (49); Katherine Brunt 2/20 (4 overs)		Deandra Dottin 25 (20); Rene Farrell 2/17 (3.1 overs)

Sydney Thunder won by 22 runs
WACA Ground, Perth
Umpires: NR Johnstone, D Krieg
Player of the match: Stafanie Taylor (Thunder)

- Sydney Thunder won the toss and elected to bat

Match 29
28 December
10:00
Scorecard

Perth Scorchers; 3/152 (20 overs)	v	Sydney Thunder; 2/156 (19.4 overs)
Charlotte Edwards 88 (66); Nicola Carey 1/18 (4 overs)		Rachael Haynes 66 (59); Deandra Dottin 1/25 (3 overs)

Sydney Thunder won by 8 wickets (with 2 balls remaining)
WACA Ground, Perth
Umpires: W Barron, T Steenholdt
Player of the match: Charlotte Edwards (Scorchers)

- Perth Scorchers won the toss and elected to bat

=== Weekend 5 ===
Match 30
31 December
14:10
Scorecard

Adelaide Strikers; 6/135 (20 overs)	v	Perth Scorchers; 100 (19.2 overs)
Sarah Taylor 48 (37); Katie-Jane Hartshorn 2/20 (4 overs)		Jenny Wallace 29 (33); Megan Schutt 3/11 (4 overs)

Adelaide Strikers won by 35 runs
Adelaide Oval
Attendance: 10,500
Umpires: L Uthenwoldt, AK Wilds
Player of the match: Megan Schutt (Strikers)

- Adelaide Strikers won the toss and elected to bat
- Double header with men's BBL match

Match 31
1 January
14:30
Scorecard

Perth Scorchers; 6/136 (20 overs)	v	Adelaide Strikers; 4/139 (18.3 overs)
Charlotte Edwards 41* (31); Amanda Wellington 2/30 (3 overs)		Sarah Coyte 52 (38); Nicole Bolton 2/24 (4 overs)

Adelaide Strikers won by 6 wickets (with 9 balls remaining)
Adelaide Oval
Umpires: C Kemp, DB Mealey
Player of the match: Sarah Coyte (Strikers)

- Perth Scorchers won the toss and elected to bat

Match 32
1 January
14:40
Scorecard

Hobart Hurricanes; 5/130 (20 overs)	v	Brisbane Heat; 97 (18.5 overs)
Corinne Hall 39 (41); Grace Harris 1/15 (3 overs)		Jodie Fields 21 (20); Veronica Pyke 3/30 (4 overs)

Hobart Hurricanes won by 33 runs
Blundstone Arena, Hobart
Attendance: 4,283
Umpires: DR Close, CA Polosak
Player of the match: Erin Burns (Hurricanes)

- Hobart Hurricanes won the toss and elected to bat
- Double header with men's BBL match
- Former Australian player Jodie Fields made her last WBBL appearance

Match 33
2 January
12:00
Scorecard

Brisbane Heat; 94 (20 overs)	v	Sydney Thunder; 5/97 (12.4 overs)
Ashleigh Barty 17 (17); Maisy Gibson 3/14 (4 overs)		Naomi Stalenberg 42 (24); Jess Jonassen 2/18 (4 overs)

Sydney Thunder won by 5 wickets (with 44 balls remaining)
Kingston Twin Ovals, Hobart
Umpires: CA Polosak, M Qureshi
Player of the match: Naomi Stalenberg (Thunder)

- Brisbane Heat won the toss and elected to bat

Match 34
2 January
13:40
Scorecard

Melbourne Stars; 9/85 (20 overs)	v	Melbourne Renegades; 5/86 (19.5 overs)
Mignon du Preez 36 (48); Molly Strano 5/15 (4 overs)		Sophie Molineux 30 (46); Natalie Sciver 1/4 (3 overs)

Melbourne Renegades won by 5 wickets (with 1 ball remaining)
Melbourne Cricket Ground
Attendance: 12,901
Umpires: D Ireland, DJ Shepard
Player of the match: Molly Strano (Renegades)

- Melbourne Stars won the toss and elected to bat
- Double header with men's BBL match
- Molly Strano took the first five-wicket haul in the WBBL

Match 35
2 January
18:00 (D/N)
Scorecard

Sydney Thunder; 7/135 (20 overs)	v	Hobart Hurricanes; 8/127 (20 overs)
Naomi Stalenberg 37 (16); Julie Hunter 2/27 (3 overs)		Heather Knight 26 (32); Rene Farrell 2/15 (4 overs)

Sydney Thunder won by 8 runs
Blundstone Arena, Hobart
Umpires: W Stewart, H Wolff
Player of the match: Naomi Stalenberg (Thunder)

- Sydney Thunder won the toss and elected to bat

Match 36
3 January
15:00
Scorecard

Sydney Thunder; 5/121 (20 overs)	v	Hobart Hurricanes; 95 (18.2 overs)
Alex Blackwell 44* (44); Veronica Pyke 1/10 (2 overs)		Erin Burns 34 (29); Nicola Carey 4/12 (3.2 overs)

Sydney Thunder won by 26 runs
Kingston Twin Ovals, Hobart
Umpires: W Stewart, H Wolff
Player of the match: Alex Blackwell (Thunder)

- Sydney Thunder won the toss and elected to bat
- Former Australian player Megan White made her last WBBL appearance

Match 37
3 January
14:30
Scorecard

Melbourne Stars; 4/120 (20 overs)	v	Melbourne Renegades; 8/112 (20 overs)
Meg Lanning 77* (58); Sophie Molineux 1/5 (1 over)		Molly Strano 29* (16); Hayley Jensen 3/25 (4 overs)

Melbourne Stars won by 8 runs
Melbourne Cricket Ground
Umpires: D Brigham, S Brne
Player of the match: Meg Lanning (Stars)

- Melbourne Stars won the toss and elected to bat

Match 38
3 January
11:00
Scorecard

Hobart Hurricanes; 4/107 (20 overs)	v	Brisbane Heat; 4/110 (18.5 overs)
Corinne Hall 33 (34); Jess Jonassen 2/14 (4 overs)		Beth Mooney 48* (49); Heather Knight 1/8 (3 overs)

Brisbane Heat won by 6 wickets (with 7 balls remaining)
Kingston Twin Ovals, Hobart
Umpires: M Qureshi, W Stewart
Player of the match: Beth Mooney (Heat)

- Hobart Hurricanes won the toss and elected to bat

=== Weekend 6 ===
Match 39
8 January
10:00
Scorecard

Melbourne Stars; 1/158 (20 overs)	v	Adelaide Strikers; 5/139 (20 overs)
Meg Lanning 84* (61)		Sarah Taylor 78* (55); Morna Nielsen 2/19 (4 overs)

Melbourne Stars won by 19 runs
Junction Oval, Melbourne
Umpires: D Ireland, S Brne
Player of the match: Meg Lanning (Stars)

- Melbourne Stars won the toss and elected to bat

Match 40
8 January
14:00
Scorecard

Sydney Sixers; 5/164 (20 overs)	v	Melbourne Renegades; 8/139 (20 overs)
Alyssa Healy 81 (54); Sophie Molineux 3/31 (4 overs)		Kris Britt 36 (31); Sarah Aley 3/17 (4 overs)

Sydney Sixers won by 25 runs
Junction Oval, Melbourne
Umpires: D Ireland, D Brigham
Player of the match: Alyssa Healy (Sixers)

- Sydney Sixers won the toss and elected to bat

Match 41
9 January
10:00
Scorecard

Sydney Sixers; 4/156 (20 overs)	v	Adelaide Strikers; 133 (20 overs)
Ellyse Perry 65 (53); Sophie Devine 2/19 (2 overs)		Sarah Taylor 47 (46); Lisa Sthalekar 4/23 (4 overs)

Sydney Sixers won by 23 runs
Junction Oval, Melbourne
Umpires: S Brne, D Ireland
Player of the match: Ellyse Perry (Sixers)

- Sydney Sixers won the toss and elected to bat

Match 42
9 January
14:40
Scorecard

Melbourne Renegades; 8/139 (20 overs)	v	Sydney Thunder; 103 (19.4 overs)
Rachel Priest 57 (55); Belinda Vakarewa 2/13 (3 overs)		Alex Blackwell 45 (41); Sophie Molineux 3/18 (4 overs)

Melbourne Renegades won by 36 runs
Etihad Stadium, Melbourne
Attendance: 14,611
Umpires: D Shepard, S Lightbody
Player of the match: Rachel Priest (Renegades)

- Melbourne Renegades won the toss and elected to bat
- Double header with men's BBL match

Match 43
9 January
14:30
Scorecard

Sydney Sixers; 6/146 (20 overs)	v	Adelaide Strikers; 8/110 (20 overs)
Ellyse Perry 47 (50); Samantha Betts 1/17 (2 overs)		Megan Schutt 24* (21); Lauren Smith 3/17 (3 overs)

Sydney Sixers won by 36 runs
Junction Oval, Melbourne
Umpires: S Brne, D Brigham
Player of the match: Sarah Aley (Sixers)

- Sydney Sixers won the toss and elected to bat

Match 44
10 January
14:30
Scorecard

Melbourne Renegades; 6/128 (20 overs)	v	Sydney Sixers; 2/129 (14.4 overs)
Dane van Niekerk 38 (41); Marizanne Kapp 2/13 (4 overs)		Ellyse Perry 67* (46); Kirsty Lamb 1/13 (1.4 overs)

Sydney Sixers won by 8 wickets (with 32 balls remaining)
Junction Oval, Melbourne
Umpires: D Brigham, S Brne
Player of the match: Ellyse Perry (Sixers)

- Melbourne Renegades won the toss and elected to bat

Match 45
10 January
10:00
Scorecard

Adelaide Strikers; 4/169 (20 overs)	v	Melbourne Stars; 7/119 (20 overs)
Sarah Coyte 72 (55); Morna Nielsen 1/15 (4 overs)		Emma Inglis 36 (30); Sarah Coyte 3/12 (4 overs)

Adelaide Strikers won by 50 runs
Junction Oval, Melbourne
Umpires: D Ireland, D Shepard
Player of the match: Sarah Coyte (Strikers)

- Adelaide Strikers won the toss and elected to bat

=== Weekend 7 ===
Match 46
15 January
14:30
Scorecard

Melbourne Stars; 7/114 (20 overs)	v	Sydney Thunder; 7/49 (10 overs)
Emma Inglis 30 (25); Stafanie Taylor 2/20 (3 overs)		Rachael Haynes 20 (25); Gemma Triscari 4/10 (2 overs)

Melbourne Stars won by 14 runs (D/L method)
Sydney Showground Stadium
Umpires: D Taylor, D Young
Player of the match: Gemma Triscari (Stars)

- Melbourne Stars won the toss and elected to bat
- Sydney Thunder's target was revised to 64 runs off 10 overs due to rain
- Gemma Triscari became the second player to take a WBBL hat-trick

Match 47
15 January
14:30
Scorecard

Sydney Sixers; 7/98 (15 overs)	v	Hobart Hurricanes; 7/74 (15 overs)
Marizanne Kapp 21 (16); Amy Satterthwaite 3/16 (3 overs)		Heather Knight 23 (25); Sarah Aley 4/8 (3 overs)

Sydney Sixers won by 25 runs (D/L method)
Waverley Oval, Sydney
Umpires: S Lightbody, B Treloar
Player of the match: Marizanne Kapp (Sixers)

- Sydney Sixers won the toss and elected to bat
- Match reduced to 15 overs per side due to rain
- Hobart Hurricanes' target revised to 100 runs

Match 48
15 January
14:30
Scorecard

Melbourne Renegades; 8/141 (20 overs)	v	Adelaide Strikers; 141 (19.3 overs)
Danielle Wyatt 55 (45); Sarah Coyte 3/32 (4 overs)		Lauren Ebsary 49* (39); Briana Binch 3/17 (2 overs)

Adelaide Strikers won in Super Over
Adelaide Oval No.2
Umpires: C Black, C Thomas
Player of the match: Lauren Ebsary (Strikers)

- Melbourne Renegades won the toss and elected to bat
- Melbourne Renegades eliminated from finals contention

Match 49
16 January
13:40
Scorecard

Sydney Sixers; 6/172 (20 overs)	v	Sydney Thunder; 9/151 (20 overs)
Ashleigh Gardner 55 (36); Lauren Cheatle 1/19 (4 overs)		Nicola Carey 53 (36); Marizanne Kapp 4/18 (4 overs)

Sydney Sixers won by 21 runs
Sydney Cricket Ground
Attendance: 12,220
Umpires: A Hobson, DB Mealey
Player of the match: Sara McGlashan (Sixers)

- Sydney Sixers won the toss and elected to bat
- Double header with men's BBL match

Match 50
16 January
10:00
Scorecard

Melbourne Stars; 7/96 (20 overs)	v	Hobart Hurricanes; 4/97 (20 overs)
Meg Lanning 22 (33); Heather Knight 3/7 (3 overs)		Corinne Hall 27 (28); Natalie Sciver 2/23 (4 overs)

Hobart Hurricanes won by 6 wickets (with 0 balls remaining)
Blacktown International Sportspark, Sydney
Umpires: A Dolin, AK Wilds
Player of the match: Amy Satterthwaite (Hurricanes)

- Melbourne Stars won the toss and elected to bat

Match 51
16 January
10:00
Scorecard

Adelaide Strikers; 5/140 (20 overs)	v	Brisbane Heat; 7/134 (20 overs)
Bridget Patterson 43 (38); Grace Harris 2/19 (4 overs)		Jess Jonassen 56 (55); Sarah Coyte 3/15 (4 overs)

Adelaide Strikers won by 6 runs
Adelaide Oval No.2
Umpires: C Kemp, L Uthenwoldt
Player of the match: Bridget Patterson (Strikers)

- Adelaide Strikers won the toss and elected to bat
- Hobart Hurricanes and Sydney Thunder qualified for finals

Match 52
16 January
14:30
Scorecard

Melbourne Renegades; 6/130 (20 overs)	v	Perth Scorchers; 1/133 (16 overs)
Dane van Niekerk 52 (44); Katherine Brunt 2/12 (3 overs)		Elyse Villani 72 (50); Danielle Wyatt 1/14 (2 overs)

Perth Scorchers won by 9 wickets (with 24 balls remaining)
Adelaide Oval No.2
Umpires: C Black, C Thomas
Player of the match: Elyse Villani (Scorchers)

- Melbourne Renegades won the toss and elected to bat

Match 53
17 January
10:00
Scorecard

Sydney Thunder; 9/104 (20 overs)	v	Melbourne Stars; 8/98 (20 overs)
Alex Blackwell 31 (39); Morna Nielsen 3/26 (4 overs)		Emma Inglis 32 (34); Rene Farrell 4/18 (4 overs)

Sydney Thunder won by 6 runs
University Oval No.1, Sydney
Umpires: A Hobson, BC Treloar
Player of the match: Rene Farrell (Thunder)

- Sydney Thunder won the toss and elected to bat

Match 54
17 January
10:00
Scorecard

Hobart Hurricanes; 4/126 (20 overs)	v	Sydney Sixers; 8/127 (20 overs)
Amy Satterthwaite 35 (29); Sarah Aley 1/21 (4 overs)		Sara McGlashan 77* (57); Amy Satterthwaite 3/22 (4 overs)

Sydney Sixers won by 2 wickets (with 0 balls remaining)
Hurstville Oval, Sydney
Umpires: AGDSJ Bandara, SA Lightbody
Player of the match: Sara McGlashan (Sixers)

- Hobart Hurricanes won the toss and elected to bat
- Sydney Sixers qualified for finals, Brisbane Heat eliminated from finals contention

Match 55
17 January
10:00
Scorecard

Melbourne Renegades; 8/128 (20 overs)	v	Adelaide Strikers; 113 (19 overs)
Danielle Wyatt 48 (37); Amanda Wellington 3/16 (4 overs)		Sarah Taylor 32 (31); Danielle Wyatt 3/20 (4 overs)

Melbourne Renegades won by 15 runs
Adelaide Oval No.2
Umpires: C Black, C Kemp
Player of the match: Danielle Wyatt (Renegades)

- Melbourne Renegades won the toss and elected to bat
- Adelaide Strikers eliminated from finals contention

Match 56
17 January
14:30
Scorecard

Melbourne Renegades; 8/108 (20 overs)	v	Perth Scorchers; 1/111 (15.2 overs)
Cassie Brock 31 (29); Nicky Shaw 3/28 (4 overs)		Charlotte Edwards 63 (51); Briana Binch 1/15 (3 overs)

Perth Scorchers won by 9 wickets (with 28 balls remaining)
Adelaide Oval No.2
Umpires: C Thomas, L Uthenwoldt
Player of the match: Charlotte Edwards (Scorchers)

- Perth Scorchers won the toss and elected to field
- Perth Scorchers qualified for finals, Melbourne Stars eliminated from finals contention

== Knockout phase ==
=== Semi-finals ===
Semi-final 1
21 January
14:10
Scorecard

Sydney Thunder; 6/118 (20 overs)	v	Perth Scorchers; 9/110 (20 overs)
Alex Blackwell 39 (41); Heather Graham 2/15 (3 overs)		Elyse Villani 23 (10); Rene Farrell 3/20 (4 overs)

Sydney Thunder won by 8 runs
Adelaide Oval
Umpires: PJ Gillespie, DB Mealey
Player of the match: Alex Blackwell (Thunder)

- Sydney Thunder won the toss and elected to bat
- Played as a double header with men's BBL semi-final

Semi-final 2
22 January
14:40
Scorecard

Hobart Hurricanes; 8/86 (14 overs)	v	Sydney Sixers; 0/55 (6.2 overs)
Erin Burns 26 (27); Lisa Sthalekar 3/9 (3 overs)		Alyssa Healy 32* (22)

Sydney Sixers won by 10 wickets (with 10 balls remaining) (D/L method)
Melbourne Cricket Ground
Umpires: GJ Davidson, AK Wilds
Player of the match: Lisa Sthalekar (Sixers)

- Hobart Hurricanes won the toss and elected to bat
- Match reduced to 14 overs per side due to rain
- Sydney Sixers' target revised to 55 runs from 8 overs
- Played as a double header with men's BBL semi-final

=== Final ===
24 January
13:40
Scorecard

Sydney Sixers; 7/115 (20 overs)	v	Sydney Thunder; 7/116 (19.3 overs)
Angela Reakes 23* (18); Erin Osborne 3/21 (4 overs)		Rachael Haynes 37 (50); Sarah Aley 2/19 (4 overs)

Sydney Thunder won by 3 wickets (with 3 balls remaining)
Melbourne Cricket Ground
Umpires: Shawn Craig and Ashley Barrow
Player of the match: Erin Osborne (Thunder)

- Sydney Sixers won the toss and elected to bat
- Sydney Thunder won the inaugural WBBL title
- Played as a double header with men's BBL final

== Statistics ==
=== Highest totals ===
Team	Score	Against	Venue	Date
Brisbane Heat	3/190 (20 overs)	Sydney Sixers	Aquinas College	12 December 2015
Sydney Sixers	6/172 (20 overs)	Sydney Thunder	Sydney Cricket Ground	16 January 2016
Adelaide Strikers	4/169 (20 overs)	Melbourne Stars	Junction Oval	10 January 2016
Sydney Sixers	5/164 (20 overs)	Melbourne Renegades	Junction Oval	8 January 2016
Melbourne Stars	1/158 (20 overs)	Adelaide Strikers	Junction Oval	8 January 2016

- Source: CricInfo

=== Most runs ===
Player	Team	Runs
Meg Lanning	Melbourne Stars	560
Charlotte Edwards	Perth Scorchers	462
Ellyse Perry	Sydney Sixers	430
Alex Blackwell	Sydney Thunder	410
Beth Mooney	Brisbane Heat	400

- Source:CricInfo

=== Most wickets ===
Player	Team	Wickets
Rene Farrell	Sydney Thunder	26
Veronica Pyke	Hobart Hurricanes	22
Sarah Aley	Sydney Sixers	19
Morna Nielsen	Melbourne Stars	18
Molly Strano	Melbourne Renegades	18

- Source: CricInfo

== Awards ==
=== Player of the tournament ===
Player of the Tournament votes are awarded on a 3-2-1 basis by the two standing umpires at the conclusion of every match, meaning a player can receive a maximum of six votes per game.

Pos.	Player	Team	Votes
1st	Meg Lanning	Melbourne Stars	36
2nd	Charlotte Edwards	Perth Scorchers	31
3rd	Heather Knight	Hobart Hurricanes	28
4th	Ellyse Perry	Sydney Sixers	26
=5th	Stafanie Taylor	Sydney Thunder	23
=5th	Beth Mooney	Brisbane Heat	23
7th	Jess Jonassen	Brisbane Heat	20
=8th	Marizanne Kapp	Sydney Sixers	19
=8th	Danielle Wyatt	Melbourne Renegades	19
10th	Amy Satterthwaite	Hobart Hurricanes	18

=== Team of the tournament ===
An honorary XI recognising the standout performers of WBBL|01 was named by bigbash.com.au:

- Meg Lanning (Melbourne Stars)
- Beth Mooney (Brisbane Heat) – wicket-keeper
- Charlotte Edwards (Perth Scorchers)
- Ellyse Perry (Sydney Sixers)
- Heather Knight (Hobart Hurricanes) – captain
- Alex Blackwell (Sydney Thunder)
- Sara McGlashan (Sydney Sixers)
- Morna Nielsen (Melbourne Stars)
- Marizanne Kapp (Sydney Sixers)
- Veronica Pyke (Hobart Hurricanes)
- Rene Farrell (Sydney Thunder)

=== Young gun award ===
Players under 21 years of age at the start of the season are eligible for the Young Gun Award. Weekly winners are selected over the course of the season by a panel of Cricket Australia officials based on match performance, on-field and off-field attitude, and their demonstration of skill, tenacity and good sportsmanship. Each weekly winner receives a $500 Rebel gift card and the overall winner receives a $5000 cash prize, as well as access to a learning and mentor program.

The WBBL|01 Young Gun title was awarded to Sydney Thunder fast bowler Lauren Cheatle, who claimed 18 wickets at an economy rate of 5.81 across the season.

== Audience ==
A total of ten matches were televised on free-to-air in the first season of Women's Big Bash League (WBBL) on One HD and Channel Ten. The average TV ratings for these matches are given below.

Initially only eight matches (seven regular season double-headers and the grand final) were scheduled to be televised on One HD. Due to higher than expected viewership, Channel Ten decided to move the Melbourne Derby on 2 January, the Sydney Smash on 16 January and the grand final to the primary channel, and also added coverage of the two semi finals on One.

Match No	Teams	Average TV Ratings		References	Broadcast Channel
Match No	Teams	National	5 metros	References	Broadcast Channel
20	Brisbane Heat vs Adelaide Strikers	250,000	165,000		One HD
24	Sydney Sixers vs Perth Scorchers	183,000	132,000		One HD
30	Adelaide Strikers vs Perth Scorchers		126,000		One HD
32	Hobart Hurricanes vs Brisbane Heat		158,000		One HD
34	Melbourne Stars vs Melbourne Renegades	372,000	254,000		Channel Ten
43	Melbourne Renegades vs Sydney Thunder			9 January 2016	One HD
50	Sydney Sixers vs Sydney Thunder			16 January 2016	Channel Ten
SF1	Perth Scorchers vs Sydney Thunder			21 January 2016	One HD
SF2	Hobart Hurricanes vs Sydney Sixers			22 January 2016	One HD
Final	Sydney Sixers vs Sydney Thunder			24 January 2016	Channel Ten
