= Sara Hungerford =

Australian cricketer (born 1986)

Personal information
- Full name: Sara Louise Hungerford
- Born: 13 February 1986 (age 40); Sydney, New South Wales, Australia
- Batting: Right-handed
- Bowling: Right-arm medium
- Role: All-rounder

Domestic team information
- Years: Team
- 2006/07: Auckland
- 2009/10–2015/16: Australian Capital Territory
- 2012: Surrey
- 2015/16: Sydney Sixers

Career statistics
Competition	WLA	WT20
Matches	52	70
Runs scored	985	893
Batting average	22.90	14.88
100s/50s	1/2	0/1
Top score	111	63
Balls bowled	301	–
Wickets	8	–
Bowling average	31.12	–
5 wickets in innings	0	–
10 wickets in match	0	–
Best bowling	4/36	–
Catches/stumpings	10/–	7/–
- Source: CricketArchive, 4 July 2021

Sara Louise Hungerford (born 13 February 1986) is a former Australian cricketer. An all-rounder, she bats right-handed and is a right-arm medium pace bowler. After briefly playing List A cricket for Auckland during the 2006–07 season, Hungerford went on to represent the Australian Capital Territory (2009/10–2015/16) and Surrey (2012) in both List A and T20 cricket. She also played for the Sydney Sixers in the Women's Big Bash League (WBBL) during the 2015–16 season.

Hungerford was born in Sydney, New South Wales. Outside of cricket, she is a consultant physician and cardiologist. Australian Test all-rounder Greg Matthews has described Hungerford as his "guardian angel" due to her efforts in treating his life-threatening salmonellosis in 2014.
