= Emma Biss =

Australian cricketer

Personal information
- Full name: Emma L Biss
- Born: 31 May 1990 (age 36); Perth, Western Australia
- Batting: Right-handed
- Bowling: Right-arm medium
- Role: Bowler

Domestic team information
- Years: Team
- 2007–: Western Fury
- 2015–: Perth Scorchers (squad no. 20)
- Source: Cricinfo, 13 June 2017

Emma Biss (born 31 May 1990) is an Australian cricketer who plays for Western Fury and Perth Scorchers as a medium pace bowler.

Born in Perth, Western Australia, and educated at Corpus Christi College, Perth, Biss represented WA at the 2006–07 National Under 19 Championships, and made her debut for the Fury in 2007–08. The highlight of her debut season was her claiming of the final wicket in a famous WNCL victory over the New South Wales Breakers at Aquinas College.

Since then, Biss has been a regular opening bowler in the Fury side, and also a big-hitting lower-order batter. In November 2013, she again starred for the Fury, with a five-wicket haul against Victorian Spirit.

Biss was named in the Scorchers squad for its inaugural WBBL|01 season (2015–16), and achieved best figures of 2–14. She remained in the Scorchers squad for the WBBL|02 season (2016–17).
