= Katie-Jane Hartshorn =

Australian cricketer

Personal information
- Full name: Katie-Jane Hartshorn
- Born: 20 June 1994 (age 32)
- Batting: Right-handed
- Bowling: Slow left-arm wrist-spin
- Role: Bowler

Domestic team information
- Years: Team
- 2011–2015: Tasmanian Roar
- 2015–: Western Fury
- 2015–: Perth Scorchers (squad no. 16)
- Source: Cricinfo, 19 June 2017

Katie-Jane Hartshorn (born 20 June 1994) is an Australian cricketer who plays for Western Fury and Perth Scorchers as a slow left-arm wrist-spin bowler. She has previously played for Tasmanian Roar.

Hartshorn debuted for the Roar in 2011. She later decided to move to Western Australia to study a bachelor of physiotherapy. At the start of the 2015–16 season, she was added to the Fury squad as a replacement for Suzie Bates, who was unavailable due to international cricket commitments. That season, Hartshorn came third among the Fury wicket-takers in the WNCL competition, with six wickets and best figures of 2–24 against her former team the Roar.

Hartshorn was one of the last players to be named in the Scorchers squad for its inaugural WBBL|01 competition (2015–16). However, she once again eventually ranked third among her team's wicket-takers, with 13 wickets at an average of 20.38 and an economy rate of 5.76. Hartshorn's best figures for the season were 4–23 against the Hobart Hurricanes, and she also captured a particularly memorable wicket against the Sydney Sixers, when Nicky Shaw took a one-handed, diving catch at full stretch to dismiss Sixers player Sara McGlashan from a ball Hartshorn had bowled.

In recognition of her breakout 2015–16 season, Hartshorn was named Female Rising Star at that season's Laurie Sawle medal night.

Hartshorn did not achieve the same prominence during the 2016–17 season. Although she once again took 6 wickets for the Fury in the WNCL tournament, she managed only three wickets for the Scorchers in WBBL|02.
