= Lachlan Stevens =

Australian cricketer (born 1978)

Personal information
- Full name: Lachlan McRae Stevens
- Born: 31 December 1978 (age 47); Toowoomba, Queensland, Australia
- Batting: Left-handed
- Bowling: Slow left-arm orthodox
- Role: Batsman

Domestic team information
- Years: Team
- 2002/03: South Australia
- 2004/05–2006/07: Queensland

Career statistics
Competition	FC	LA
Matches	14	7
Runs scored	631	53
Batting average	25.24	7.57
100s/50s	1/4	0/0
Top score	105	18
Balls bowled	228	138
Wickets	2	0
Bowling average	65.50	–
5 wickets in innings	0	0
10 wickets in match	0	0
Best bowling	1/4	–
Catches/stumpings	11/–	2/–
- Source: CricketArchive, 30 March 2022

Lachlan McRae Stevens (born 31 December 1978) is an Australian former cricketer and current cricket coach. He played as a left-handed batsman for South Australia and Queensland. He is currently the batting and assistant coach at Somerset, and has previously coached Western Australia and Perth Scorchers' men's teams and Victoria and Melbourne Renegades' women's teams.

== Career ==
Stevens is a former Queensland colts and youth captain. Despite this he played his first Australian domestic game for South Australia, in 2002–03. After limited success he returned to Brisbane and made his Pura Cup debut for Queensland in 2004–05. His maiden first-class century came against Western Australia at The Gabba. He was part of Queensland's record-breaking Pura Cup final victory in 2005–06 and scored 66 opening the batting. Stevens took the match-winning catch as they won by an innings and 354 runs.

In November 2011, Stevens was named as head coach of Western Australia and the Perth Scorchers, taking over from Mickey Arthur, who became coach of the Australian national cricket team. He had previously been the state's assistant coach. Stevens resigned from the position in November 2012, and was replaced by Justin Langer. In 2020 he was appointed coach of the Victoria women's cricket team and Melbourne Renegades Women, but only spent one season at the two teams, resigning for family reasons. In March 2022 he was appointed batting and assistant coach at Somerset CCC, signing a contract until at least the end of the 2023 season.
