= 2005–06 Sheffield Shield season =

Cricket tournament

- Cricket format: First-class
- Tournament format(s): Double round-robin & Final
- Champions: Queensland (6th title)
- Participants: 6
- Matches: 31
- Player of the series: Andy Bichel (Queensland)
- Most runs: Darren Lehmann (South Australia) (1,168)
- Most wickets: Andy Bichel (Queensland) (50)

The 2005–06 Sheffield Shield season known as the Pura Cup was the 104th season of the Sheffield Shield, the domestic first-class cricket competition of Australia. Queensland won the championship.

== Table ==
Team	Played	Won	Lost	Tied	Drawn	N/R	Points
Queensland	10	5	2	0	3	0	34
Victoria	10	4	4	0	2	0	30
South Australia	10	4	3	0	3	0	26
Tasmania	10	4	4	0	2	0	26
Western Australia	10	3	6	0	1	0	24
New South Wales	10	3	4	0	3	0	20

== Final ==
24–28 March 2006
Scorecard

Victoria	v	Queensland (H)
344 (100 overs); Brad Hodge 108 (168); Mitchell Johnson 4/55 (14 overs)		6/900d (242 overs); Jimmy Maher 223 (387); Dirk Nannes 3/150 (40 overs)
202 (60 overs); Nick Jewell 69 (162); Mitchell Johnson 6/51 (20 overs)

Queensland won by an innings and 354 runs
The Gabba, Brisbane
Umpires: Peter Parker and Bob Parry
Player of the match: Jimmy Maher (Queensland)

- Victoria won the toss and elected to bat.

== Statistics ==
=== Most runs ===
Player	Team	Mat	Inns	NO	Runs	Ave	HS	100	50
Darren Lehmann	South Australia	10	16	3	1168	89.84	301*	4	4
Jimmy Maher	Queensland	10	18	1	906	53.29	223	2	5
Travis Birt	Tasmania	10	18	1	850	50	160	2	5
Martin Love	Queensland	11	20	2	828	46	169	3	3
Nick Jewell	Victoria	11	20	0	827	41.35	143	1	6

=== Most wickets ===
Player	Team	Mat	Inns	Overs	Wkts	Ave	Econ	BBI	BBM	5	10
Andy Bichel	Queensland	11	20	429.0	50	26.68	3.10	7/56	8/81	2	0
Adam Griffith	Tasmania	10	17	389.3	48	25.85	3.18	5/79	7/115	2	0
Michael Kasprowicz	Queensland	8	15	326.0	44	23.13	3.12	8/44	9/83	2	0
Jason Gillespie	South Australia	9	18	355.5	40	21.27	2.39	7/35	9/125	3	0
Ben Hilfenhaus	Tasmania	10	17	345.3	39	30.82	3.47	7/58	10/87	1	1
