= Nicole Goodwin =

Australian cricketer (born 1984)

Personal information
- Full name: Nicole Maree Goodwin
- Born: 14 September 1984 (age 42); Newcastle, New South Wales, Australia
- Batting: Right-handed
- Bowling: Left-arm fast-medium
- Role: Bowler

Domestic team information
- Years: Team
- 2005/06–2010/11: New South Wales
- 2011: Nottinghamshire
- 2015/16–2017/18: Australian Capital Territory
- 2016/17: Melbourne Renegades

Career statistics
Competition	WLA	WT20
Matches	47	25
Runs scored	82	11
Batting average	10.25	11.00
100s/50s	0/0	0/0
Top score	20*	4*
Balls bowled	1,863	390
Wickets	39	9
Bowling average	31.92	47.55
5 wickets in innings	1	0
10 wickets in match	0	0
Best bowling	5/31	3/17
Catches/stumpings	6/–	4/–
- Source: CricketArchive, 28 June 2021

Nicole Maree Goodwin (born 14 September 1984) is a former Australian cricketer. A left-arm fast-medium bowler, she was capped at under-19 level for Australia. Domestically, she played 47 List A matches and 25 T20 matches during her professional career. Goodwin represented her home state of New South Wales between 2005/06 and 2010/11, winning the Women's National Cricket League on three occasions. She has also played for Nottinghamshire (2011), the Australian Capital Territory (2015/16–2017/18) and the Melbourne Renegades during the 2016–17 Women's Big Bash League season.

Born in Newcastle, New South Wales, Goodwin is a police officer outside of cricket.
