= Megan White (cricketer) =

Australian cricketer (born 1980)

Personal information
- Full name: Megan Lisa White
- Born: 30 July 1980 (age 46); Australia
- Batting: Right-handed
- Bowling: Right-arm medium
- Role: Bowler

International information
- National side: Australia (1999)
- Only ODI (cap 88): 21 February 1999 v New Zealand

Domestic team information
- Years: Team
- 1997/98–1999/00: Queensland
- 2000/01: Victoria
- 2001/02–2015/16: Queensland
- 2007: Cheshire
- 2015/16: Brisbane Heat

Career statistics
Competition	WODI	WFC	WLA	WT20
Matches	1	1	94	4
Runs scored	–	–	1,164	1
Batting average	–	–	17.90	0.33
100s/50s	–	–	0/0	0/0
Top score	–	–	43	1
Balls bowled	30	282	2,216	–
Wickets	0	4	44	–
Bowling average	–	15.75	33.93	–
5 wickets in innings	0	0	0	–
10 wickets in match	0	0	0	–
Best bowling	–	2/26	4/41	–
Catches/stumpings	0/–	1/–	28/–	1/–
- Source: CricketArchive, 20 April 2022

Megan Lisa White (born 30 July 1980) is an Australian former cricketer who played primarily as a right-arm medium bowler. She appeared in one One Day International for Australia in 1999, against New Zealand. She played domestic cricket for Queensland, Victoria, Brisbane Heat and Cheshire.
