= Katelyn Fryett =

Australian cricketer

Personal information
- Full name: Katelyn Fryett
- Born: 28 May 1992 (age 34); Launceston, Tasmania
- Batting: Right-handed
- Bowling: Right-arm fast medium
- Role: Bowler

Domestic team information
- Years: Team
- 2009–2020: Tasmanian Roar
- 2015–2020: Hobart Hurricanes (squad no. 9)
- Source: Cricinfo, 13 May 2017

Katelyn Fryett (born 28 May 1992) is a retired Australian cricketer who played for Tasmanian Roar and Hobart Hurricanes as a pace bowler.

== Early life ==
Born in Launceston and raised in Bracknell, Tasmania, Fryett played backyard cricket with her brother Brad, and would bowl to him a lot. As a junior cricketer, she played for her school, and also with the local under-16 boys’ team. She began her interstate cricket career by playing for several seasons in Tasmanian underage and Cricket Australia Cup teams. In 2008 and again in 2009, she was named Tasmania's top female cricketer.

== Cricket career ==
At the start of the 2009–10 season, Fryett made her debut for Tasmanian Roar at the age of 17 years, when the Roar joined the domestic WNCL competition. In December 2009, she became the Roar's first national representative, upon being named in the Shooting Stars national development squad as a replacement for Ellyse Perry, who had commitments to her W-league soccer team.

In 2013, Fryett was omitted from the Shooting Stars squad, but at the end of the 2013–14 season, she secured a Shooting Stars contract after taking nine wickets in six of that season's WNCL matches at an average of 25.44.

Fryett experienced another setback early in the 2014–15 season, when a knee injury caused her to miss a round of WNCL matches against Queensland Fire. However, the injury turned out to be not as serious as first thought.

The following summer, Fryett was part of the Hurricanes squad for its inaugural WBBL|01 season (2015–16), during which she took two wickets. She remained in the squad for the WBBL|02 season (2016–17). During the Australian winter of 2017, she played cricket in Ireland with the support of an Adam Gilchrist Scholarship, funded by the Lord's Taverners. She then rejoined the Roar and the Hurricanes for the 2016–17 season.

Fryett retired from top level cricket at the end of the 2019–20 season, after playing her final match for University against Greater Northern Raiders in Tasmania's Grade Cricket Competition. Her teammates in that match included her 57-year-old mother, who filled in as regular members of the team were absent. Her father and brother also attended. In an interview about that match, Fryett told The Examiner that "I still have a few things I want to do while I am still young and I am getting married in a few weeks."

== Personal life ==
Fryett works as a pharmacist. She told The Examiner in March 2020 that "Sean, my long-term partner [and now husband], made a lot of sacrifices for me to pursue a cricket career and always supportive along with my family." Fryett also played netball for the Arrows, Hawks and Cavaliers teams in Tasmania's ANZ State League from 2007 to 2013. In 2021, she returned from an 8-year hiatus donning the bib for up and coming club, Clovers. Playing as a center and wing attack, Fryett picked up where she left off instantly becoming an integral part of a side working their way up the ladder. In June 2021 Fryett tore her ACL in an unfortunate landing during a game of netball.
