= Cassie Brock =

Australian cricketer (born 1991)

Personal information
- Full name: Cassandra Ellen Brock
- Born: 31 January 1991 (age 35)
- Batting: Right-handed
- Bowling: Right-arm leg spin
- Role: Top-order batter

Domestic team information
- Years: Team
- 2010/11–2015/16: Victoria
- 2015/16: Melbourne Renegades

Career statistics
Competition	WLA	WT20
Matches	7	20
Runs scored	4	97
Batting average	2.00	8.08
100s/50s	0/0	0/0
Top score	2	31
Balls bowled	–	18
Wickets	–	0
Bowling average	–	–
5 wickets in innings	–	–
10 wickets in match	–	–
Best bowling	–	–
Catches/stumpings	0/–	5/–
- Source: CricketArchive, 28 June 2021

Cassandra Ellen Brock (born 31 January 1991) is an Australian cricketer. She represented Victoria (2010/11–2015/16) and the Melbourne Renegades (2015/16), playing a total of seven List A matches and 20 T20 matches. A right-handed top-order batter, she is also a right-arm leg spinner capable of bowling googly deliveries.
