= Julie Hunter =

Australian women's cricketer

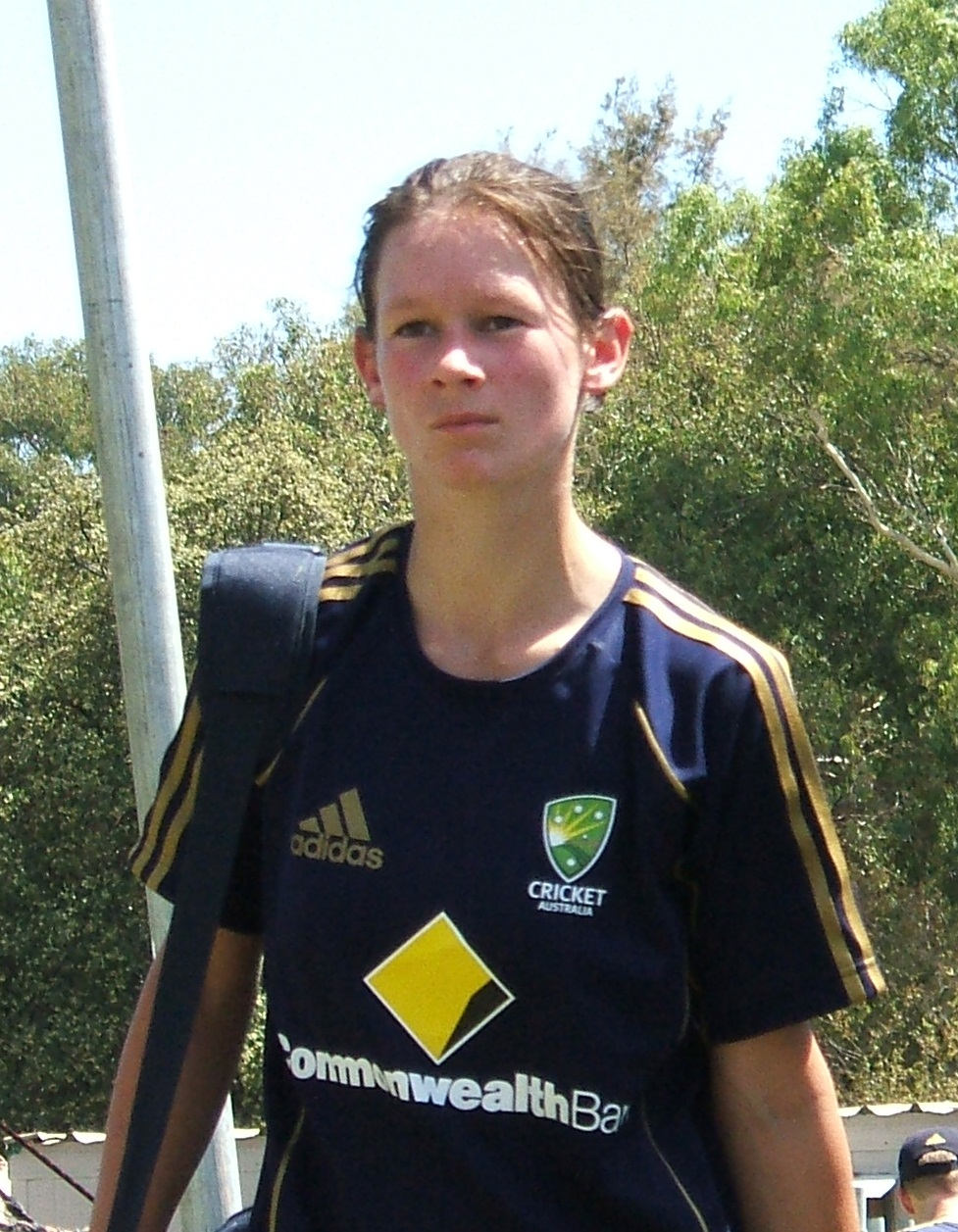

Personal information
- Full name: Julie Lauren Hunter
- Born: 15 March 1984 (age 42); Box Hill, Victoria, Australia
- Nickname: Randall, Sniper
- Batting: Right-handed
- Bowling: Right-arm medium

International information
- National side: Australia
- ODI debut (cap 117): 18 February 2010 v New Zealand
- Last ODI: 18 November 2014 v West Indies
- T20I debut (cap 30): 26 February 2010 v New Zealand
- Last T20I: 5 September 2014 v Pakistan

Domestic team information
- Years: Team
- 2003/04–2014/15: Victorian Spirit
- 2015: Middlesex
- 2015/16–2016/17: Tasmanian Tigers
- 2015/16–2016/17: Hobart Hurricanes

Career statistics
Competition	ODI	T20I	LA
Matches	24	32	125
Runs scored	22	9	338
Batting average	22.00	4.50	10.24
100s/50s	0/0	0/0	0/0
Top score	16*	6	30
Balls bowled	973	618	5,354
Wickets	24	33	129
Bowling average	24.87	13.33	24.86
5 wickets in innings	0	1	1
10 wickets in match	0	0	0
Best bowling	3/31	5/22	5/30
Catches/stumpings	5/–	2/–	932–
- Source: CricketArchive, 28 April 2021

Julie Lauren Hunter (born 15 March 1984) is a female cricketer who played for Victorian Spirit, Tasmanian Tigers and Australia. She is a right-handed pace bowler who also bats right-handed.

After playing for the Australian Under-19 team in 2002–03, Hunter made her senior debut for Victoria in the Women's National Cricket League (WNCL) the following season. She was not trusted with much responsibility in her first season, and bowled less than 60% of the maximum possible quota of overs, and was dropped mid-way through the finals series against New South Wales, which was lost. After touring Sri Lanka with the Australian Under-23 team in September 2004, Hunter played in Victoria's triumphant 2004–05 WNCL team. After being attacked in the first final against New South Wales, she was dropped, but returned for the third match and scored 15 and took 2/13 to help seal the WNCL title. Hunter ended the season with nine wickets at 25.44.

Starting in 2005–06 Hunter struggled for four seasons, taking 8, 7, 6 and 8 wickets respectively, with her annual average and economy rate rising from 31.00 and 3.70 to 39.75 and 4.33 respectively. In 2009–10, Hunter had her most productive WNCL season, taking 14 wickets at 25.57 as well as 12 wickets at 7.58 in the Twenty20 competition.

She was rewarded by national selection for the first time for the Rose Bowl series against New Zealand. She made her ODI debut in the fifth match at the Junction Oval and took her career best figures of 3/40 in her third match on the New Zealand leg of the tour in Invercargill.

== Early career ==
Hunter was selected for the Victoria Blue team to compete in the Under-17 interstate competition in March 2000 at the age of 15. Victoria Blue won all of but one of their seven qualifying matches to reach the final; the only defeat came at the hands of New South Wales, who prevailed over them in the deciding match. Hunter accumulated 137 runs at 22.83 with a best of 44 not out against the Australian Capital Territory, and took 12 wickets at 6.16. She took 3/7 against Tasmania and 3/8 against Queensland. In the final, she took 2/12 from four overs as New South Wales made 8/133 and then scored 34 as Victoria Blue made 9/91 to lose by 32 runs. The following year, she played in two more Under-17 matches, scoring 34 in Victoria's 6/154 before taking 5/9 as Western Australia were dismissed for only 27. For the 2001 tournament, she took six wickets at 3.83 and scored 36 runs at 18.00.

In January 2002, she was selected for the Victorian Under-19 team for the interstate tournament. Hunter scored 88 runs at 17.60 and took 11 wickets at 10.90 from six matches. Her best bowling of 3/26 came in another loss to New South Wales, while her top-score of 46 came against the Australian Cricket Board team. She was then selected in the Australia Youth team to play against the senior New Zealand team, but neither batted nor bowled in an Australian defeat.

Hunter returned to the Under-19 competition in the following year, and scored 106 runs at 21.20 and took seven wickets at 20.85. Her best batting and bowling performances came in the first match when she took 3/9 as Western Australia were bowled out for 65, before scoring an unbeaten 40 as Victoria reached the target with nine wickets in hand. She was then brought into the Under-19 Australian team for two matches against their English counterparts. Australia won both the matches, although Hunter only took one wicket and scored one run.

== Domestic debut ==
Hunter made her senior debut for Victoria in the 2003–04 season. She took 1/32 from 9.1 overs in her first match, against Western Australia, and had the winning runs hit from her bowling as Victoria lost by two wickets. She was in and out of the team in her first season and played in seven of eleven matches. A tail-ender, she only batted once and ended unbeaten without scoring, and she only managed four wickets at 31.25 at an economy rate of 3.19. Although a specialist bowler, she averaged less than six of the maximum ten overs allowed per bowler per match. In the first final against New South Wales, she took 0/14 from four overs as the Victorians chased down the target of 129 with six wickets to spare. However, New South Wales hit back the next day, and won by five wickets, taking 10 runs from Hunter's two overs. She was dropped for the third and deciding final, which New South Wales won.

During the Australian off-season, she was selected for an Australian Under-23 team to play against the senior Sri Lankan team. In the first one-dayer, she took 5/30 from nine overs to help dismiss the hosts for 102, setting up a nine-wicket win. She ended the three one-dayers with six wickets at 8.33 at an economy rate of 2.08 and 12 runs at 12.00 as Australia took a clean sweep. In the first-class match that followed, she scored 44 in the first innings and took 1/13 as Australia took a 102-run first innings lead. She then made six not out and took 0/8 as they completed a 140-run win.

Hunter then played a full set of matches in the 2004–05 WNCL. She took only two wickets in the first four matches before taking 2/19 from seven overs against New South Wales, which was not enough to stop a defeat. She then took her season's best analysis of 2/8 from five overs, helping to restrict south Australia to 8/99 and a 12-run win. Going into the finals series against New South Wales, Hunter had only taken six wickets in eight round-robin matches. In the first game, she was attacked by the New South Wales batsmen, taking 1/58 from nine overs as the Victorians conceded 3/200. She was unbeaten on four when Victoria were bowled out for a 21-run defeat. Hunter was dropped for the second final, which Victoria won by five wickets to force a third game. Hunter was recalled and made 15 as Victoria made 6/159. She then took 2/13 from four overs to help her state to a 50-run win and the WNCL title. Hunter ended the season with nine wickets at 25.44 at an economy rate of 3.46, and scored 19 runs at 19.00.

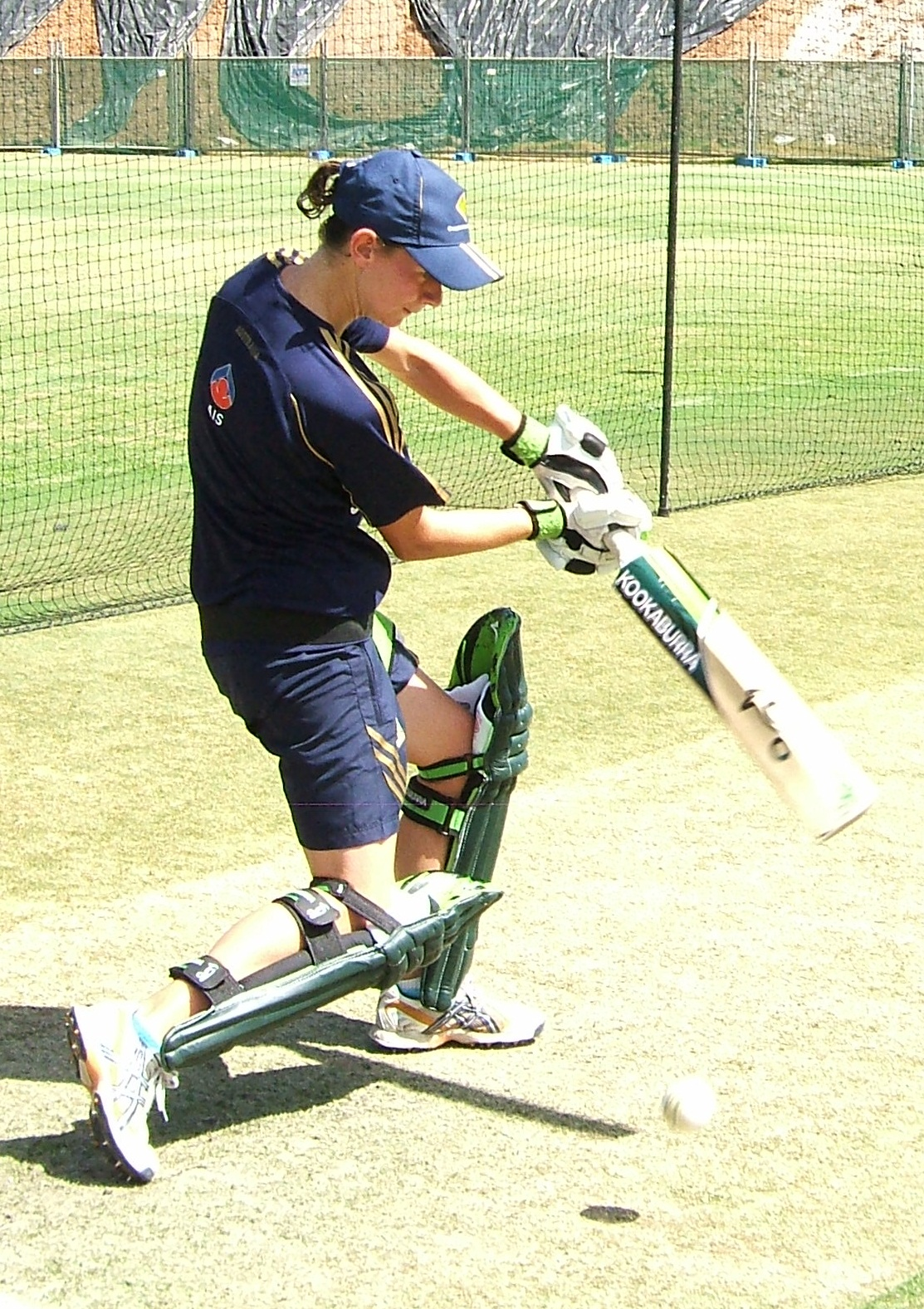
Hunter batting in the Adelaide Oval nets.

In 2005–06, Victoria struggled in their WNCL defence. Hunter took only two wickets in the first four matches, of which Victoria won two. The defending champions then played in a double-header against New South Wales. In the first match, Hunter took 3/37 from her ten overs. She was then unbeaten on 12 as Victoria were dismissed for 136 in a 48-run loss. The next day, she took 3/36 from ten overs but it was not enough to prevent a five-wicket defeat. Hunter was hit for more than five runs per over in two wicketless displays in the last two matches of the season against Queensland, both of which were lost. Victoria won only two of their eight matches and did not qualify for the final. Hunter ended with eight wickets at 31.00 at an economy rate of 3.70. She also scored 31 runs at 10.33.

Hunter had another lean season in the 2006–07 season. In the second match of the season, she took 2/14 from four overs as Victoria defeated reigning champions New South Wales by six wickets. However, she only took another two wickets in the remaining six matches before the finals. Victoria won six of eight matches to reach the finals against New South Wales. In the first match, she took 2/24 from nine overs as the title-holders scraped home by one wicket to their target of 137. The next day, she took 1/17 from seven overs to help set up a series-levelling eight wicket win. In the deciding match, Hunter conceded 13 runs from only two overs as New South Wales reached their target of 206 with three wickets in hand to seal a three-wicket win and the WNCL. In 11 matches, Hunter took seven wickets at 31.00 at an economy rate of 3.39; she did not bat for the entire season.

Hunter's returns diminished further in the 2007–08 WNCL. In the second match of the season, she took 2/30 from ten overs in a 42-run win over Western Australia, and then took 4/35 form ten overs against New South Wales, who made 8/228 and went on to win 25 runs. However, she failed to take another wicket in the remaining four matches at an economy rate over five. Victoria won only three of eight matches and did not make the final. Hunter ended with six wickets at 35.16 at a relatively high economy rate of 4.12 and made 8 runs at 4.00. She also had a bad time in her only T20 match, conceding 44 runs without taking a wicket in four overs as South Australia scored 1/59 to win by nine wickets.

During the 2008–09 WNCL, Hunter took eight wickets at 39.75 at an economy rate of 4.33, her worst season's average and economy rate in any season. She took a wicket in each of the first two matches of the season, against South Australia, and then took 3/32 from 8.2 overs to set up a four-wicket win over Queensland. This was followed by two wicketless matches before taking 2/40 in a six-wicket win over Western Australia. She struggled against New South Wales taking 0/27 from five overs in a nine-wicket defeat, and took 1/37 in a three-wicket loss the next day. The following week, she took 0/15 from eight overs as New South Wales reached their target of 120 with six wickets in hand to win the title. She took 0/22 from three overs in her only T20 match of the season, and did not bat in any form of cricket for Victoria.

In 2009–10, Hunter had her most successful WNCL season. After taking one wicket in the first two matches against Western Australia, she took career best bowling figures in senior cricket, claiming 4/34 again Queensland, helping to bowl them out for 151 and setting up a four-wicket Victorian win. She took a wicket in each of the two matches against New South Wales, which were split between the two teams. Hunter took three wickets in the two matches against South Australia, which were both won, before having an uneconomical end to her season. She took 3/45 from 9.5 overs in a one-wicket win the Australian Capital Territory, before conceding 46 runs from 36 wicketless balls against the same team the following day. Victoria went on to meet New South Wales in the final, where Hunter took 1/44 from her ten overs, dismissing Lisa Sthalekar and taking two catches in the defending champions' 9/206. She scored 13 as Victoria were dismissed for 147 and New South Wales took out their fifth WNCL title in a row. Hunter ended the season with 14 wickets at 25.57 and an economy rate of 4.06. she also scored 60 runs at 12.00, almost twice as much as her previous best aggregate for a season.

The season also saw the introduction of a full-scale T20 domestic competition. Hunter started successfully with 3/5 from 15 balls against Western Australia, and then 3/13 from 3.3 overs against Queensland, setting up strong Victorian wins by 74 and 92 runs. She then took 2/19 from four overs in a seven-run win over New South Wales. Hunter took two wickets in the last three round-robin matches. This included the fixture against South Australia in which she made 22 in a tail-wagging performance to push the total to 9/120 before taking 1/9 from three overs to help secure an 18-run win. In the final against New South Wales, she was not required to bat as Victoria made 5/127. She then took 2/7 from her two overs, helping to dismiss New South Wales for 52 runs and seal a 52-run win. Hunter ended the tournament with 12 wickets at 7.58 and an economy rate of 3.95. She also scored 38 runs at 38.00.

In 2015/16 WNCL season, she moved to Tasmanian Tigers and also signed for Hobart Hurricanes in the WBBL.

== International debut ==
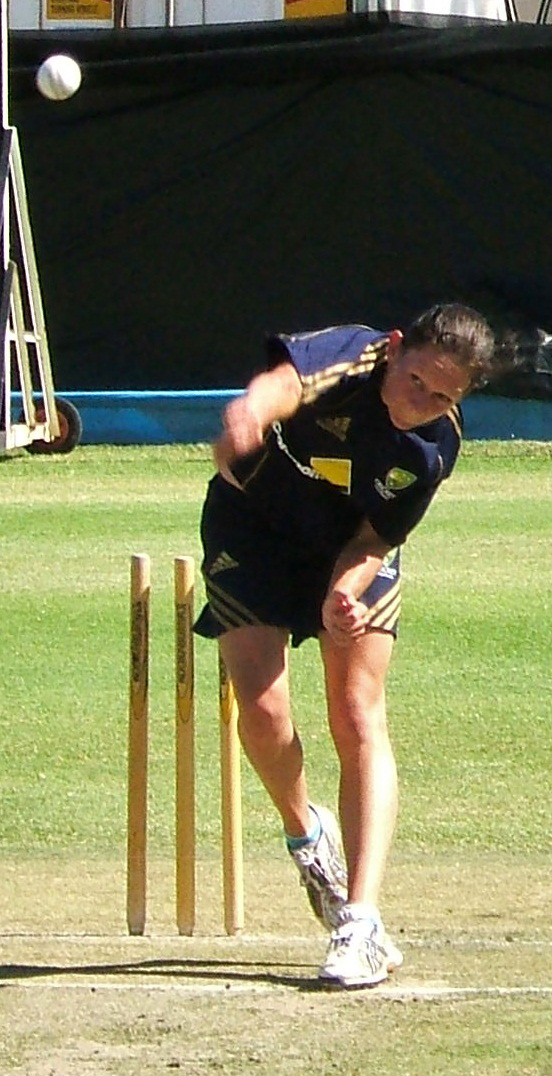
Hunter bowling in the nets.

Hunter was rewarded with selection in the Australian squad for the Rose Bowl series against New Zealand in 2010. Australia won the first four home ODIs and Hunter did not debut until the fifth and final ODI at the Junction Oval, where she did not bat and then took 1/20 from seven overs and a catch in a 103-run win; Australia swept the series 5–0.

In the five T20s internationals that followed, three at Bellerive Oval in Hobart, and two in New Zealand, Hunter only played in the last two matches in New Zealand, taking 1/23 and 1/29 from four overs each. She made six in the fourth match, her first innings at international level as Australia lost by 59 runs. She made a duck in the final match as New Zealand won all five T20s.

She then played in all three ODIs in New Zealand as fellow right-arm fast bowler Rene Farrell was left out. In the first match in Queenstown, she took 1/38 from ten overs. In the run-chase she made six not out at the death as Australia reached the target with two wickets in hand from the last ball of the match. She took 3/40 from eight overs in the second match, as Australia restricted the hosts to 8/255 before completing a six-wicket win. The following day, she took 2/35 in the final ODI, from only six overs in another six-wicket win in the last two matches at Invercargill. Hunter ended with six wickets at 18.83 at and economy rate of 4.70.

== 2010 World Twenty20 ==
Hunter was selected for the 2010 World Twenty20 in the West Indies but spent almost the entire tournament watching from the sidelines, playing in only the two warm-up matches. In the first warm-up match, against New Zealand, she took 0/19 from two overs as New Zealand made 136 and then did not bat as Australia made 5/118. In the second preparatory she took 1/17 from four overs as the Australians defeated Pakistan by 82 runs. Hunter was not used in the tournament itself, after succumbing to a shoulder injury, and the three pace bowlers used were Clea Smith, Ellyse Perry and Rene Farrell. Australia won all three group matches, and then the semi-final and final to take the tournament.

== Records ==
She holds the record for taking the most number of wickets in WT20I in a single calendar year(24)

== Retirement ==
In January 2017, Hunter announcement her retirement from cricket.

== Personal life ==
Hunter's nicknames are "Randall" and "Sniper". She has said that the former is due to her "... striking resemblance to Randall Boggs, the lizard thing from Monsters, Inc.," and that the latter alludes to her surname.
