= Jenny Taffs =

Australian cricketer

Personal information
- Full name: Jennifer E Taffs
- Born: c. 1995 (age 30–31) (Note: Date of birth reported as 30 November 1994, 1 January 1995, 30 January 1995 and 18 June 1995.); Zimbabwe
- Batting: Right-handed
- Bowling: Slow left-arm orthodox
- Role: All-rounder

Domestic team information
- Years: Team
- 2013/14–2015/16: Australian Capital Territory
- 2015/16: Melbourne Renegades

Career statistics
Competition	WLA	WT20
Matches	9	28
Runs scored	151	290
Batting average	25.16	13.80
100s/50s	0/1	0/1
Top score	53	57
Balls bowled	94	72
Wickets	2	4
Bowling average	50.00	23.75
5 wickets in innings	0	0
10 wickets in match	0	0
Best bowling	1/19	1/6
Catches/stumpings	2/–	8/–
- Source: CricketArchive, 27 June 2021

Jennifer E Taffs (born c. 1995) is an Australian former cricketer. She is an all-rounder who bats right-handed and bowls slow left-arm orthodox. She played for the Australian Capital Territory and the Melbourne Renegades, totalling nine List A matches and 28 T20 matches. In May 2021, she was named women's assistant coach of the Prahran Cricket Club.

Taffs was born in Zimbabwe, the daughter of John and Val Taffs. She spent the first years of her life growing up on a tobacco farm in Chipinge. In 2001, her family emigrated to Australia, settling in Coffs Harbour, New South Wales.
