= Briana Binch =

Australian cricketer (born 1987)

Personal information
- Full name: Briana Carly Binch
- Born: 18 June 1987 (age 39); Carlton, Victoria, Australia
- Nickname: Crackers
- Batting: Right-handed
- Bowling: Right-arm medium
- Role: Bowler

Domestic team information
- Years: Team
- 2007: Middlesex
- 2008/09–2015/16: Victoria
- 2015/16: Melbourne Renegades

Career statistics
Competition	WLA	WT20
Matches	57	80
Runs scored	294	122
Batting average	11.76	9.38
100s/50s	0/0	0/0
Top score	27	27
Balls bowled	2,328	1,315
Wickets	60	65
Bowling average	27.93	21.52
5 wickets in innings	0	0
10 wickets in match	0	0
Best bowling	4/26	3/8
Catches/stumpings	17/–	16/–
- Source: CricketArchive, 27 June 2021

Briana Carly Binch (born 18 June 1987) is a former Australian cricketer. A right-arm medium bowler, she played 57 List A matches for English side Middlesex (2007) and her home state Victoria (2008/09–2015/16). She also played T20 cricket for Victoria, and took the most wickets (54) for her state in the now-defunct Australian Women's Twenty20 Cup. During the 2015–16 Women's Big Bash League season, Binch played 13 matches for the Melbourne Renegades, taking nine wickets.

Binch was born in Carlton, a suburb of Melbourne, Victoria. As of 2021, Binch is vice-president of the World Indoor Cricket Federation (WICF).
