= Veronica Pyke =

Australian cricketer

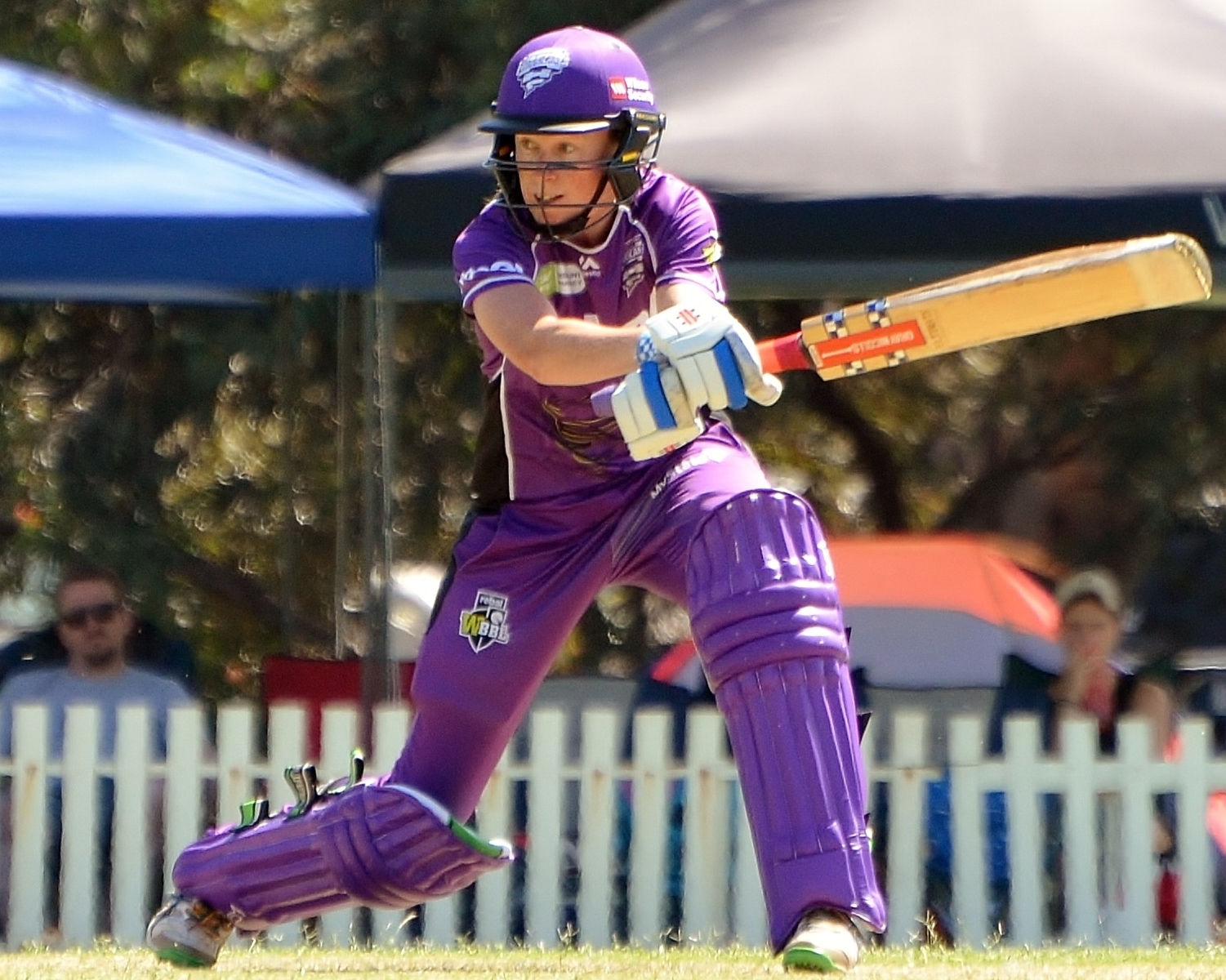
- Pyke batting for the Hobart Hurricanes, 2018

Personal information
- Full name: Veronica Pyke
- Born: 11 April 1981 (age 45); Hobart, Tasmania, Australia
- Batting: Right-handed
- Bowling: Left-arm medium
- Role: All-rounder

Domestic team information
- Years: Team
- 2009/10–2018/19: Tasmania
- 2015/16–2018/19: Hobart Hurricanes
- LA debut: 16 October 2010 Tasmania v New South Wales
- Last LA: 20 November 2016 Tasmania v Western Australia
- T20 debut: 23 October 2009 Tasmania v ACT
- Last T20: 25 January 2017 Hobart Hurricanes v Sydney Sixers

Career statistics
| Competition | List A | Twenty20 |
|---|---|---|
| Matches | 53 | 120 |
| Runs scored | 716 | 717 |
| Batting average | 15.23 | 12.15 |
| 100s/50s | 0/2 | 0/0 |
| Top score | 53 | 35* |
| Balls bowled | 2,778 | 2,404 |
| Wickets | 56 | 88 |
| Bowling average | 35.82 | 28.52 |
| 5 wickets in innings | 0 | 0 |
| 10 wickets in match | 0 | 0 |
| Best bowling | 3/19 | 4/17 |
| Catches/stumpings | 13/– | 27/– |
- Source: CricketArchive, 12 April 2023

Veronica Pyke (born 11 April 1981) is an Australian former cricketer who played for Tasmanian Roar and Hobart Hurricanes.

== Early life ==
From Orford on the east coast of Tasmania, Pyke first played senior cricket with the men's team in her home town.

== Tasmanian Roar ==
Pyke has captained Tasmanian Roar since that team joined the domestic competition. Originally she was known as a left-arm bowler, but over time she has developed into an all-rounder. During the 2012–13 WNCL competition, she scored a total of 151 runs, more than any other Roar player.

At Cricket Tasmania's awards night in 2013–14, Pyke won the Tasmanian Roar Player of the Year award, after also being named the team's WNCL Player of the Year and WT20 Player of the Year.

In round 1 of the 2015–16 WNCL competition, Pyke scored 24 runs against the ACT Meteors and took 3/21 against the Victorian Spirit. However, the Roar lost all three of its matches in that round, including its match against the Queensland Fire. In the next round, a match against the New South Wales Breakers in Launceston, Pyke scored 41 from 33 balls, but again the Roar fell short of victory. In the final round, in Adelaide, Pyke took two wickets in the Roar's losing effort against the Western Fury. She then made 28 runs against the South Australian Scorpions, but after her dismissal the Roar suffered yet another loss.

== Hobart Hurricanes ==
Pyke was part of the Hurricanes squad for the Women's Big Bash League inaugural season in 2015–16. She finished second on that season's table of the leading WBBL wicket takers, with 22 wickets at an average of 13.09, and a best performance of 3 for 19 against the Melbourne Renegades. At the end of the season, the Australian Cricketers' Association selected her in its WBBL All*Star Team of the Year. She was also a member of the Hurricanes squad for the 2016–17 WBBL season. In November 2018, she was named in the Hobart Hurricanes' squad for the 2018–19 Women's Big Bash League season.

== Personal life ==
Off the field, Pyke is a Parks and Reserves officer with the Glamorgan Spring Bay Council.
