= 2021–22 Brisbane Heat WBBL season =

Women's Big Bash cricket season

Brisbane Heat
2021–22 season
- Coach: Ashley Noffke
- Captain(s): Jess Jonassen
- Home ground: Great Barrier Reef Arena
- League: WBBL
- Record: 8–5 (3rd)
- Finals: Lost the Eliminator
- Leading Run Scorer: Georgia Redmayne – 437
- Leading Wicket Taker: Jess Jonassen – 21
- Player of the Season: Grace Harris

The 2021–22 Brisbane Heat Women's season was the seventh in the team's history. Coached by Ashley Noffke and captained by Jess Jonassen, the Heat were scheduled to play four of 14 regular season WBBL|07 games at Great Barrier Reef Arena in Mackay—the only fixtures in their home state of Queensland for the tournament due to construction work taking place at regular primary ground Allan Border Field. They finished in third place on the ladder, resulting in their fourth consecutive finals series appearance. However, for the second year in a row, the Heat were eliminated by a lower-ranked opponent in their first match of the knockout stage—this time suffering a "crushing" eight-wicket defeat at the hands of the Adelaide Strikers.

== Squad ==
Each 2021–22 squad is made up of 15 active players. Teams could sign up to five 'marquee players', with a maximum of three of those from overseas. Marquees were classed as any overseas player, or a local player who holds a Cricket Australia national contract at the start of the WBBL|07 signing period.

Personnel changes made ahead of the season included:

- New Zealand marquees Amelia Kerr and Maddy Green did not re-sign with the Heat.
- South African marquee Anneke Bosch and Indian marquee Poonam Yadav signed with the Heat, marking their first appearances in the league.
- Delissa Kimmince departed the Heat, retiring from cricket after WBBL|06.
- Lilly Mills departed the Heat, signing with the Perth Scorchers.

The table below lists the Heat players and their key stats (including runs scored, batting strike rate, wickets taken, economy rate, catches and stumpings) for the season.

No.	Name	Nat.	Birth date	Batting style	Bowling style	G	R	SR	W	E	C	S	Notes
Batters
14	Mikayla Hinkley	(Australia)	1 May 1998	Right-handed	Right-arm off spin	14	161	88.95	–	–	3	–	
77	Ellie Johnston	(New Zealand)	29 January 2003	Right-handed	Right-arm leg spin	4	17	85.00	–	–	1	–	
4	Laura Kimmince	(Australia)	18 August 1990	Right-handed	–	14	148	140.95	–	–	7	–	
88	Charli Knott	(Australia)	5 May 2003	Right-handed	Right-arm off spin	6	20	90.90	1	7.83	0	–	
19	Georgia Voll	(Australia)	5 August 2003	Right-handed	Right-arm off spin	14	282	113.25	–	–	4	–	
All-rounders
27	Anneke Bosch	(South Africa)	17 August 1993	Right-handed	Right-arm medium	10	46	85.18	2	7.00	3	–	Overseas marquee
35	Zoe Cooke	(Australia)	17 September 1995	Right-handed	Right-arm medium fast	–	–	–	–	–	–	–	
32	Nadine de Klerk	(South Africa)	16 January 2000	Right-handed	Right-arm medium	9	59	95.16	4	6.60	4	–	Overseas marquee
17	Grace Harris	(Australia)	18 September 1993	Right-handed	Right-arm off spin	14	420	123.16	6	7.63	10	–	
21	Jess Jonassen	(Australia)	5 November 1992	Left-handed	Left-arm orthodox	14	101	93.51	21	6.49	4	–	Captain, Australian marquee
Wicket-keeper
8	Georgia Redmayne	(Australia)	8 December 1993	Left-handed	–	14	437	120.05	–	–	13	4	
Bowlers
44	Nicola Hancock	(Australia)	8 November 1995	Right-handed	Right-arm medium fast	12	76	146.15	14	7.06	3	–	
16	Georgia Prestwidge	(Australia)	17 December 1997	Right-handed	Right-arm medium fast	7	0	0.00	7	8.05	1	–	
37	Courtney Sippel	(Australia)	27 April 2001	Left-handed	Right-arm medium fast	9	14	100.00	12	6.80	2	–	
24	Poonam Yadav	(India)	24 August 1991	Right-handed	Right-arm leg spin	13	5	125.00	10	6.63	2	–	Overseas marquee

== Ladder ==
Pos	Team	Pld	W	L	NR	Pts	NRR
1	Perth Scorchers (C)	14	9	3	2	20	0.649
2	Melbourne Renegades (CF)	14	8	4	2	18	−0.149
3	Brisbane Heat (EF)	14	8	5	1	17	0.517
4	Adelaide Strikers (RU)	14	7	6	1	15	0.707
5	Melbourne Stars	14	5	7	2	12	−0.385
6	Hobart Hurricanes	14	5	8	1	11	−0.258
7	Sydney Thunder	14	4	8	2	10	−0.301
8	Sydney Sixers	14	4	9	1	9	−0.704

Source: cricket.com.au, ESPN Cricinfo
- The top 4 teams advanced to the play-off phase

== Fixtures ==
All times are local

=== Regular season ===
Match 4
17 October 2021
13:40
Scorecard

Perth Scorchers; 7/137 (20 overs)	v	Brisbane Heat; 9/137 (20 overs)
Beth Mooney 40 (37); Jess Jonassen 3/16 (4 overs)		Grace Harris 41 (27); Lilly Mills 3/28 (4 overs)

Match tied
(Perth Scorchers won the Super Over)
Blundstone Arena, Hobart
Umpires: Claire Polosak and Mattie van Eck
Player of the match: Alana King (Perth Scorchers)

- Brisbane Heat won the toss and elected to field.
- Broadcast by Seven Network and Foxtel
- Start time swapped with Match 5
- Super Over: Brisbane Heat 2/12 (1 over), Perth Scorchers 0/14 (0.4 overs).

Match 7
19 October 2021
16:50 (D/N)
Scorecard

Brisbane Heat; 5/162 (20 overs)	v	Perth Scorchers; 103 (17.2 overs)
Georgia Redmayne 59* (52); Heather Graham 2/15 (4 overs)		Sophie Devine 18 (15); Grace Harris 3/16 (3.2 overs)

Brisbane Heat won by 59 runs
Blundstone Arena, Hobart
Umpires: Andrew Crozier and Jeremiah Matibiri
Player of the match: Georgia Redmayne (Brisbane Heat)

- Perth Scorchers won the toss and elected to field.
- Broadcast by Cricket Network and Foxtel

Match 11
23 October 2021
14:00
Scorecard

Melbourne Stars	v	Brisbane Heat

Match abandoned
Invermay Park, Launceston
Umpires: Andrew Crozier and Mattis van Eck

- No toss
- No play was possible due to rain.
- Broadcast by Cricket Network and Foxtel

Match 14
24 October 2021
10:15
Scorecard

Brisbane Heat; 5/104 (11 overs)	v	Adelaide Strikers; 4/99 (11 overs)
Georgia Voll 31* (17); Darcie Brown 3/28 (3 overs)		Laura Wolvaardt 54 (30); Jess Jonassen 2/17 (2 overs)

Brisbane Heat won by 5 runs
Invermay Park, Launceston
Umpires: Roberto Howard and Muhammad Qureshi
Player of the match: Laura Wolvaardt (Adelaide Strikers)

- Adelaide Strikers won the toss and elected to field.
- The match was reduced to 11 overs per side after a wet outfield delayed the start of play.
- Broadcast by Cricket Network and Foxtel
- Darcie Brown became the sixth player to take a WBBL hat-trick.

Match 18
26 October 2021
16:50 (N)
Scorecard

Hobart Hurricanes; 8/132 (20 overs)	v	Brisbane Heat; 2/138 (18.3 overs)
Ruth Johnston 47 (42); Jess Jonassen 3/14 (4 overs)		Grace Harris 57* (46); Nicola Carey 2/16 (3 overs)

Brisbane Heat won by 8 wickets (with 9 balls remaining)
University of Tasmania Stadium, Launceston
Umpires: Shawn Craig and Muhammad Qureshi
Player of the match: Grace Harris (Brisbane Heat)

- Brisbane Heat won the toss and elected to field.
- Broadcast by Cricket Network and Foxtel

Match 24
30 October 2021
19:30 (N)
Scorecard

Brisbane Heat; 6/170 (20 overs)	v	Hobart Hurricanes; 9/156 (20 overs)
Grace Harris 75 (51); Ruth Johnston 2/30 (4 overs)		Mignon du Preez 73 (49); Jess Jonassen 3/25 (4 overs)

Brisbane Heat won by 14 runs
University of Tasmania Stadium, Launceston
Umpires: Simon Burns and Andrew Crozier
Player of the match: Grace Harris (Brisbane Heat)

- Hobart Hurricanes won the toss and elected to field.
- Broadcast by Cricket Network and Foxtel

Match 27
31 October 2021
13:40
Scorecard

Brisbane Heat; 9/95 (20 overs)	v	Melbourne Stars; 2/99 (16.4 overs)
Grace Harris 28 (23); Annabel Sutherland 3/21 (4 overs)		Maia Bouchier 32* (34); Nicola Hancock 1/14 (3 overs)

Melbourne Stars won by 8 wickets (with 20 balls remaining)
University of Tasmania Stadium, Launceston
Umpires: Andrew Crozier and David Taylor
Player of the match: Tess Flintoff (Melbourne Stars)

- Brisbane Heat won the toss and elected to bat.
- Broadcast by Seven Network and Foxtel

Match 31
6 November 2021
9:45
Scorecard

Melbourne Renegades; 4/207 (20 overs)	v	Brisbane Heat; 192 (20 overs)
Harmanpreet Kaur 65 (32); Grace Harris 1/29 (3 overs)		Laura Kimmince 42 (21); Ellie Falconer 4/29 (4 overs)

Melbourne Renegades won by 15 runs
Karen Rolton Oval, Adelaide
Umpires: Shawn Craig and Harsimran Singh
Player of the match: Harmanpreet Kaur (Melbourne Renegades)

- Brisbane Heat won the toss and elected to field.
- Broadcast by Cricket Network and Foxtel
- The combined team totals of 399 runs set a new record for highest match aggregate in WBBL history.

Match 34
7 November 2021
9:45
Scorecard

Sydney Thunder; 7/143 (20 overs)	v	Brisbane Heat; 5/144 (18.2 overs)
Phoebe Litchfield 40 (32); Poonam Yadav 3/17 (4 overs)		Georgia Redmayne 57 (45); Hannah Darlington 3/21 (4 overs)

Brisbane Heat won by 5 wickets (with 10 balls remaining)
Adelaide Oval, Adelaide
Umpires: Claire Polosak and Harsimran Singh
Player of the match: Georgia Redmayne (Brisbane Heat)

- Sydney Thunder won the toss and elected to bat.
- Broadcast by Seven Network and Foxtel

Match 37
9 November 2021
14:05
Scorecard

Sydney Sixers; 2/159 (20 overs)	v	Brisbane Heat; 2/162 (18.3 overs)
Ashleigh Gardner 86* (52); Georgia Prestwidge 1/23 (3 overs)		Grace Harris 54 (39); Radha Yadav 1/33 (4 overs)

Brisbane Heat won by 8 wickets (with 9 balls remaining)
Karen Rolton Oval, Adelaide
Umpires: D Bhatt and David Taylor
Player of the match: Ashleigh Gardner (Sydney Sixers)

- Sydney Sixers won the toss and elected to bat.
- Broadcast by Cricket Network and Foxtel

Match 44
13 November 2021
18:05 (N)
Scorecard

Sydney Sixers; 7/91 (20 overs)	v	Brisbane Heat; 7/92 (14.1 overs)
Nicole Bolton 25 (31); Jess Jonassen 3/15 (4 overs)		Georgia Redmayne 19 (16); Lauren Cheatle 3/16 (4 overs)

Brisbane Heat won by 3 wickets (with 35 balls remaining)
Harrup Park, Mackay
Umpires: Stephen Dionysius and Eloise Sheridan
Player of the match: Courtney Sippel (Brisbane Heat)

- Brisbane Heat won the toss and elected to field.
- Broadcast by Seven Network and Foxtel
- Melbourne Renegades qualified for finals.

Match 45
14 November 2021
9:15
Scorecard

Brisbane Heat; 7/94 (20 overs)	v	Adelaide Strikers; 2/98 (16.2 overs)
Laura Kimmince 22* (11); Amanda-Jade Wellington 2/21 (4 overs)		Katie Mack 54* (48); Courtney Sippel 2/22 (4 overs)

Adelaide Strikers won by 8 wickets (with 22 balls remaining)
Harrup Park, Mackay
Umpires: Steven Farrell and Claire Polosak
Player of the match: Katie Mack (Adelaide Strikers)

- Brisbane Heat won the toss and elected to bat.
- Broadcast by Seven Network and Foxtel
- Jess Jonassen (Brisbane Heat) became the first player to appear in 100 WBBL matches.

Match 50
19 November 2021
18:05 (D/N)
Scorecard

Sydney Thunder; 5/162 (20 overs)	v	Brisbane Heat; 9/153 (20 overs)
Sammy-Jo Johnson 52 (36); Nadine de Klerk 1/15 (3 overs)		Georgia Redmayne 54 (52); Deepti Sharma 2/21 (4 overs)

Sydney Thunder won by 9 runs
Harrup Park, Mackay
Umpires: Joshua Adie and Steven Farrell
Player of the match: Sammy-Jo Johnson (Sydney Thunder)

- Sydney Thunder won the toss and elected to bat.
- Broadcast by Cricket Network and Foxtel

Match 54
20 November 2021
18:05 (N)
Scorecard

Brisbane Heat; 5/156 (20 overs)	v	Melbourne Renegades; 113 (18.1 overs)
Georgia Redmayne 71 (51); Rhiann O'Donnell 2/26 (3 overs)		Josie Dooley 35 (27); Jess Jonassen 3/10 (3.1 overs)

Brisbane Heat won by 43 runs
Harrup Park, Mackay
Umpires: Steven Farrell and Nathan James
Player of the match: Georgia Redmayne (Brisbane Heat)

- Brisbane Heat won the toss and elected to bat.
- Broadcast by Cricket Network and Foxtel

=== Eliminator ===
24 November 2021
18:40 (N)
Scorecard

Brisbane Heat; 8/114 (20 overs)	v	Adelaide Strikers; 2/118 (16.3 overs)
Nicola Hancock 40 (26); Amanda-Jade Wellington 5/8 (4 overs)		Katie Mack 50* (42); Poonam Yadav 1/19 (3 overs)

Adelaide Strikers won by 8 wickets (with 21 balls remaining)
Adelaide Oval, Adelaide
Umpires: Claire Polosak and David Taylor
Player of the match: Amanda-Jade Wellington (Adelaide Strikers)

- Adelaide Strikers won the toss and elected to field.
- Broadcast by Seven Network and Foxtel
- Amanda-Jade Wellington (Adelaide Strikers) set a new WBBL record for best bowling figures in an innings.

== Statistics and awards ==
- Most runs: Georgia Redmayne – 437 (5th in the league)
- Highest score in an innings: Grace Harris – 75 (51) vs Hobart Hurricanes, 30 October 2021
- Most wickets: Jess Jonassen – 21 (2nd in the league)
- Best bowling figures in an innings: Jess Jonassen – 3/10 (3.1 overs) vs Melbourne Renegades, 20 November 2021
- Most catches (fielder): Grace Harris – 10 (equal 2nd in the league)
- Player of the Match awards:
  - Georgia Redmayne – 3
  - Grace Harris – 2
  - Courtney Sippel – 1
- WBBL|07 Player of the Tournament: Grace Harris (4th), Georgia Redmayne (equal 5th)
- WBBL|07 Team of the Tournament: Georgia Redmayne, Grace Harris, Jess Jonassen
- Brisbane Heat MVP: Grace Harris
