= 2019–20 Brisbane Heat WBBL season =

Australian cricket team season

Brisbane Heat
2019–20 season
- Coach: Ashley Noffke
- Captain(s): Kirby Short
- Home ground: Allan Border Field
- League: WBBL
- Record: 10–4 (1st)
- Finals: Champions
- Leading Run Scorer: Beth Mooney – 743
- Leading Wicket Taker: Jess Jonassen – 21
- Player of the Season: Jess Jonassen

The 2019–20 Brisbane Heat Women's season was the fifth in the team's history. Coached by Ashley Noffke and captained by Kirby Short, the Heat finished first on the WBBL|05 ladder. They proceeded to defeat the Adelaide Strikers in the final at Allan Border Field by six wickets, successfully defending their WBBL|04 title to claim a second consecutive championship. Keeper-batter Beth Mooney again earned Player of the Final honours, while Jess Jonassen won the Heat's Most Valuable Player award.

== Squad ==
Each 2019–20 squad featured 15 players, with an allowance of up to five marquee signings including a maximum of three from overseas. Australian marquees are players who held a national women's team contract at the beginning of the WBBL|05 signing period.

The Heat made several personnel changes in the lead-up to the season:

- Ashley Noffke replaced Peter McGiffin as head coach.
- Josie Dooley signed with the Melbourne Renegades to establish herself as a wicket-keeper—a role already occupied at Brisbane by Beth Mooney.
- Jemma Barsby opted to "pursue a fresh challenge" with a move to the Perth Scorchers.
- Vacant roster spots were subsequently allocated to young Queensland locals Charli Knott and Lilly Mills.
- South African duo Laura Wolvaardt and Suné Luus were not re-signed for WBBL|05.
- Overseas marquee positions were filled by New Zealanders Maddy Green and Amelia Kerr.

The table below lists the Heat players and their key stats (including runs scored, batting strike rate, wickets taken, economy rate, catches and stumpings) for the season.

No.	Name	Nat.	Birth date	Batting style	Bowling style	G	R	SR	W	E	C	S	Notes
Batters
5	Maddy Green	(New Zealand)	20 October 1992	Right-handed	Right-arm off spin	16	309	112.36	–	–	3	–	Overseas marquee
17	Grace Harris	(Australia)	18 September 1993	Right-handed	Right-arm off spin	16	212	123.97	6	8.35	5	–	
1	Laura Harris	(Australia)	18 August 1990	Right-handed	–	16	179	157.01	–	–	2	–	
14	Mikayla Hinkley	(Australia)	1 May 1998	Right-handed	Right-arm off spin	15	22	81.48	–	–	7	–	
8	Charli Knott	(Australia)	5 May 2003	Right-handed	Right-arm medium	–	–	–	–	–	–	–	
10	Kirby Short	(Australia)	3 November 1986	Right-handed	Right-arm off spin	16	70	88.60	–	–	2	–	Captain
All-rounders
21	Jess Jonassen	(Australia)	5 November 1992	Left-handed	Left-arm orthodox	16	419	133.01	21	6.83	2	–	Australian marquee
56	Lilly Mills	(Australia)	2 January 2001	Right-handed	Right-arm off spin	1	–	–	–	–	1	–	
37	Courtney Sippel	(Australia)	27 April 2001	Left-handed	Right-arm medium fast	1	–	–	0	12.00	0	–	
Wicketkeepers
6	Beth Mooney	(Australia)	14 January 1994	Left-handed	–	16	743	125.08	–	–	6	3	Australian marquee
Bowlers
23	Haidee Birkett	(Australia)	23 June 1996	Right-handed	Right-arm medium fast	–	–	–	–	–	–	–	
58	Sammy-Jo Johnson	(Australia)	5 November 1992	Right-handed	Right-arm medium fast	16	83	125.75	18	6.69	3	–	
48	Amelia Kerr	(New Zealand)	13 October 2000	Right-handed	Right-arm leg spin	16	107	125.88	14	6.22	4	–	Overseas marquee
11	Delissa Kimmince	(Australia)	14 May 1989	Right-handed	Right-arm medium	16	41	93.18	17	7.75	5	–	Australian marquee
16	Georgia Prestwidge	(Australia)	17 December 1997	Right-handed	Right-arm medium fast	15	1	100.00	11	7.18	5	–	

== Ladder ==
Pos	Team	Pld	W	L	NR	Pts	NRR
1	Brisbane Heat (C)	14	10	4	0	20	0.723
2	Adelaide Strikers (RU)	14	10	4	0	20	0.601
3	Perth Scorchers	14	9	5	0	18	0.026
4	Melbourne Renegades	14	8	6	0	16	0.117
5	Sydney Sixers	14	7	7	0	14	−0.076
6	Sydney Thunder	14	5	8	1	11	−0.487
7	Hobart Hurricanes	14	4	9	1	9	−0.197
8	Melbourne Stars	14	2	12	0	4	−0.734

- The four top ranked teams qualified for the play-off phase.

== Fixtures ==
All times are local time

=== Regular season ===
Match 4
19 October 2019
19:40 (D/N)
Scorecard

Brisbane Heat; 6/165 (20 overs)	v	Sydney Sixers; 73 (14.4 overs)
Beth Mooney 50 (45); Hayley Silver-Holmes 2/35 (4 overs)		Ellyse Perry 27 (30); Amelia Kerr 3/8 (3 overs)

Brisbane Heat won by 92 runs
North Sydney Oval, Sydney
Umpires: Darren Close and Berend du Plessis
Player of the match: Laura Harris (Brisbane Heat)

- Brisbane Heat won the toss and elected to bat
- Broadcast by Seven Network and Fox Cricket

Match 6
20 October 2019
14:10
Scorecard

Brisbane Heat; 9/150 (20 overs)	v	Sydney Thunder; 3/153 (18.5 overs)
Jess Jonassen 42 (34); Samantha Bates 3/33 (4 overs)		Phoebe Litchfield 52* (48); Grace Harris 1/19 (3 overs)

Sydney Thunder won by 7 wickets (with 7 balls remaining)
North Sydney Oval, Sydney
Umpires: Troy Penman and Andrew Hamilton
Player of the match: Phoebe Litchfield (Sydney Thunder)

- Brisbane Heat won the toss and elected to bat
- Broadcast by Seven Network and Fox Cricket
- Phoebe Litchfield became the youngest player to score a half-century in the WBBL

Match 10
26 October 2019
13:10
Scorecard

Brisbane Heat; 7/146 (20 overs)	v	Perth Scorchers; 1/147 (18.2 overs)
Beth Mooney 67 (55); Jemma Barsby 2/19 (4 overs)		Amy Jones 60* (49); Georgia Prestwidge 1/15 (2 overs)

Perth Scorchers won by 9 wickets (with 10 balls remaining)
Allan Border Field, Brisbane
Attendance: approx. 2,500
Umpires: David Taylor and Simon Lightbody
Player of the match: Amy Jones (Perth Scorchers)

- Perth Scorchers won the toss and elected to field
- Broadcast by Seven Network and Fox Cricket

Match 14
27 October 2019
13:10
Scorecard

Hobart Hurricanes; 8/123 (20 overs)	v	Brisbane Heat; 5/124 (19.5 overs)
Heather Knight 61* (49); Jess Jonassen 4/20 (4 overs)		Beth Mooney 44* (50); Nicola Carey, Maisy Gibson 1/18 (4 overs)

Brisbane Heat won by 5 wickets (with 1 ball remaining)
Allan Border Field, Brisbane
Attendance: approx. 1,600
Umpires: Andrew Hamilton and Berend du Plessis
Player of the match: Jess Jonassen (Brisbane Heat)

- Brisbane Heat won the toss and elected to field
- Broadcast by Seven Network and Fox Cricket

Match 20
2 November 2019
18:15 (D/N)
Scorecard

Brisbane Heat; 139 (19.1 overs)	v	Adelaide Strikers; 2/143 (19 overs)
Beth Mooney 73 (49); Sophie Devine 2/21 (3 overs)		Bridget Patterson 57* (43); Amelia Kerr 1/24 (4 overs)

Adelaide Strikers won by 8 wickets (with 6 balls remaining)
Harrup Park, Mackay
Umpires: Steven Farrell and David Taylor
Player of the match: Bridget Patterson (Adelaide Strikers)

- Adelaide Strikers won the toss and elected to field
- Broadcast by Cricket Network

Match 22
3 November 2019
15:00
Scorecard

Adelaide Strikers; 8/141 (20 overs)	v	Brisbane Heat; 1/142 (17.1 overs)
Sophie Devine 65 (53); Georgia Prestwidge 3/29 (4 overs)		Beth Mooney 77* (51); Amanda Wellington 1/16 (2.1 overs)

Brisbane Heat won by 9 wickets (with 17 balls remaining)
Harrup Park, Mackay
Umpires: Steven Farrell and David Taylor
Player of the match: Beth Mooney (Brisbane Heat)

- Adelaide Strikers won the toss and elected to bat
- Broadcast by Cricket Network

Match 26
9 November 2019
15:00
Scorecard

Sydney Sixers; 7/123 (20 overs)	v	Brisbane Heat; 3/127 (16.5 overs)
Dane van Niekerk 28 (32); Jess Jonassen 2/20 (4 overs)		Jess Jonassen 33 (28); Dane van Niekerk 2/19 (4 overs)

Brisbane Heat won by 7 wickets (with 19 balls remaining)
North Sydney Oval, Sydney
Umpires: Roberto Howard and Berend du Plessis
Player of the match: Jess Jonassen (Brisbane Heat)

- Sydney Sixers won the toss and elected to bat
- Broadcast by Cricket Network

Match 32
13 November 2019
14:00
Scorecard

Melbourne Stars; 4/165 (20 overs)	v	Brisbane Heat; 1/168 (19.3 overs)
Mignon du Preez 88 (51); Delissa Kimmince 3/27 (4 overs)		Beth Mooney 70* (60); Madeline Penna 1/34 (4 overs)

Brisbane Heat won by 9 wickets (with 3 balls remaining)
CitiPower Centre, Melbourne
Umpires: Dale Ireland and Mattis van Eck
Player of the match: Mignon du Preez (Melbourne Stars)

- Brisbane Heat won the toss and elected to field
- Broadcast by Cricket Network
- Beth Mooney became the first player to score 400 runs in five consecutive WBBL seasons

Match 34
16 November 2019
19:10 (D/N)
Scorecard

Brisbane Heat; 8/128 (20 overs)	v	Sydney Thunder; 96 (19.1 overs)
Laura Harris 30 (22); Nida Dar 2/15 (4 overs)		Tahlia Wilson 19 (27); Jess Jonassen 4/13 (4 overs)

Brisbane Heat won by 32 runs
Drummoyne Oval, Sydney
Attendance: 921
Umpires: Troy Penman and Marc Nickl
Player of the match: Amelia Kerr (Brisbane Heat)

- Sydney Thunder won the toss and elected to field
- Broadcast by Seven Network and Fox Cricket

Match 37
17 November 2019
10:00
Scorecard

Perth Scorchers; 8/112 (20 overs)	v	Brisbane Heat; 2/113 (16.1 overs)
Nat Sciver 26 (29); Jess Jonassen 4/23 (4 overs)		Beth Mooney 60* (44); Nat Sciver 1/17 (4 overs)

Brisbane Heat won by 8 wickets (with 23 balls remaining)
Drummoyne Oval, Sydney
Umpires: Andrew Hamilton and Sharad Patel
Player of the match: Jess Jonassen (Brisbane Heat)

- Brisbane Heat won the toss and elected to field
- Broadcast by Cricket Network

Match 38
20 November 2019
10:00
Scorecard

Brisbane Heat; 5/153 (20 overs)	v	Melbourne Renegades; 9/147 (20 overs)
Jess Jonassen 63* (29); Georgia Wareham 2/27 (4 overs)		Danielle Wyatt 40 (18); Sammy-Jo Johnson 2/30 (4 overs)

Brisbane Heat won by 6 runs
CitiPower Centre, Melbourne
Umpires: Dale Ireland and Daryl Brigham
Player of the match: Jess Jonassen (Brisbane Heat)

- Melbourne Renegades won the toss and elected to field
- Broadcast by Cricket Network

Match 42
22 November 2019
19:10 (D/N)
Scorecard

Brisbane Heat; 9/157 (20 overs)	v	Hobart Hurricanes; 7/150 (20 overs)
Grace Harris 43 (27); Belinda Vakarewa 3/17 (4 overs)		Erin Fazackerley 35 (21); Amelia Kerr 2/16 (4 overs)

Brisbane Heat won by 7 runs
Blundstone Arena, Hobart
Umpires: Darren Close and Jeremiah Matibiri
Player of the match: Amelia Kerr (Brisbane Heat)

- Hobart Hurricanes won the toss and elected to field
- Broadcast by Seven Network and Fox Cricket

Match 48
27 November 2019
13:10
Scorecard

Brisbane Heat; 4/183 (20 overs)	v	Melbourne Renegades; 4/185 (19 overs)
Beth Mooney 86 (57); Danielle Wyatt 2/26 (3 overs)		Danielle Wyatt 87 (55); Georgia Prestwidge 1/20 (2 overs)

Melbourne Renegades won by 6 wickets (with 6 balls remaining)
Allan Border Field, Brisbane
Umpires: Steven Farrell and Stephen Dionysius
Player of the match: Danielle Wyatt (Melbourne Renegades)

- Melbourne Renegades won the toss and elected to field
- Broadcast by Cricket Network
- Melbourne Renegades set a new record for highest successful run chase in WBBL history

Match 55
1 December 2019
15:00
Scorecard

Melbourne Stars; 6/87 (10 overs)	v	Brisbane Heat; 2/88 (8.4 overs)
Elyse Villani 25 (17); Amelia Kerr 2/4 (2 overs)		Beth Mooney 50* (27); Annabel Sutherland 1/14 (2 overs)

Brisbane Heat won by 8 wickets (with 8 balls remaining)
CitiPower Centre, Melbourne
Umpires: Dale Ireland and Greg Azzopardi
Player of the match: Beth Mooney (Brisbane Heat)

- Brisbane Heat won the toss and elected to field
- Match reduced to 10 overs per side due to rain delay
- Broadcast by Cricket Network
- Former Australian player Kristen Beams made her last WBBL appearance

=== Knockout phase ===
Semi-final 2
7 December 2019
13:50
Scorecard

Melbourne Renegades; 4/163 (20 overs)	v	Brisbane Heat; 6/166 (18 overs)
Josephine Dooley 50* (42); Jess Jonassen 1/25 (4 overs)		Maddy Green 46 (29); Molly Strano 4/28 (4 overs)

Brisbane Heat won by 4 wickets (with 12 balls remaining)
Allan Border Field, Brisbane
Attendance: 2,031
Umpires: Claire Polosak and Ben Treloar
Player of the match: Jess Jonassen (Brisbane Heat)

- Brisbane Heat won the toss and elected to field
- Broadcast by Seven Network and Fox Cricket

Final
8 December 2019
13:40
Scorecard

Adelaide Strikers; 7/161 (20 overs)	v	Brisbane Heat; 4/162 (18.1 overs)
Amanda-Jade Wellington 55 (33); Jess Jonassen 2/30 (4 overs)		Beth Mooney 56* (45); Tahlia McGrath 2/34 (4 overs)

Brisbane Heat won by 6 wickets (with 11 balls remaining)
Allan Border Field, Brisbane
Attendance: 2,700
Umpires: Claire Polosak and Ben Treloar
Player of the match: Beth Mooney (Brisbane Heat)

- Brisbane Heat won the toss and elected to field
- Broadcast by Seven Network and Fox Cricket
- Brisbane Heat won their second WBBL title

== Statistics and awards ==
- Most runs: Beth Mooney – 743 (2nd in the league)
- Highest score in an innings: Beth Mooney – 86 (57) vs Melbourne Renegades, 27 November
- Most wickets: Jess Jonassen – 21 (2nd in the league)
- Best bowling figures in an innings: Jess Jonassen – 4/13 (4 overs) vs Sydney Thunder, 16 November
- Most catches: Mikayla Hinkley – 7 (equal 9th in the league)
- Player of the Match awards:
  - Jess Jonassen – 5
  - Beth Mooney – 3
  - Amelia Kerr – 2
  - Laura Harris – 1
- Heat Most Valuable Player: Jess Jonassen
- WBBL|05 Player of the Tournament: Beth Mooney (2nd), Jess Jonassen (5th)
- WBBL|05 Team of the Tournament: Jess Jonassen, Beth Mooney, Ashley Noffke (coach)
- Player of the Final: Beth Mooney
