= 2023–24 Brisbane Heat WBBL season =

Brisbane Heat
2023-24 season
- Coach: Ashley Noffke
- Captain(s): Jess Jonassen
- Home ground: Allan Border Field
- League: WBBL

The 2023–24 Brisbane Heat Women's season is the ninth in the team's history. The team is coached by Ashley Noffke and captained by Jess Jonassen.

== Squad ==
The 2023–24 season saw a players draft being held for the first time for Women's Big Bash League on 3 September 2023 for overseas players.

- New Zealand's spin all-rounder Amelia Kerr and English wicket-keeper Bess Heath were picked up by Heat in the draft. South African batter Mignon du Preez was signed by direct nomination.
- Danni Wyatt, Jess Kerr and Zoe Cooke of previous year squad miss out this year's squad.
- English spinner Sarah Glenn was signed as a replacement cover of Amelia Kerr as Kerr was not available for the first few games.
- Local quick Lucy Hamilton was also signed by Heat for the season.
- Players with international caps are listed in **bold**.

| No. | Name | Nat. | Birth date | Batting style | Bowling style | Notes |
Batters
| 4 | Laura Harris | (Australia) | 18 August 1990 | Right-handed | Right-arm medium | |
| 14 | Mikayla Hinkley | (Australia) | 1 May 1998 | Right-handed | Right-arm medium | |
| 13 | Georgia Voll | (Australia) | 5 August 2003 | Right-handed | Right-arm off spin | |
All-rounders
| 5 | Lucy Hamilton | (Australia) | 8 May 2006 | Left-handed | Left-arm fast | Local Replacement Player |
| 44 | Nicola Hancock | (Australia) | 8 November 1995 | Right-handed | Right-arm medium | |
| 17 | **Grace Harris** | (Australia) | 18 September 1993 | Right-handed | Right-arm off spin | |
| 48 | **Amelia Kerr** | (New Zealand) | 13 October 2000 | Right-handed | Right-arm leg spin | Overseas |
| 88 | Charli Knott | (Australia) | 5 May 2003 | Right-handed | Right-arm off spin | |
| 3 | **Sarah Glenn** | (England) | 27 August 1999 | Right-handed | Right-arm leg spin | International Replacement Player |
Wicket-keeper
| 77 | Ellie Johnston | (Australia) | 29 January 2003 | Right-handed | – | |
| 8 | Georgia Redmayne | (Australia) | 8 December 1993 | Left-handed | – | |
| 22 | **Mignon du Preez** | (South Africa) | 13 June 1989 | Right-handed | – | Overseas |
| 25 | Bess Heath | (England) | 20 August 2001 | Right-handed | – | Overseas |
Bowlers
| 21 | **Jess Jonassen** | (Australia) | 5 November 1992 | Left-handed | Left-arm orthodox | Captain |
| 34 | Grace Parsons | (Australia) | 18 August 2003 | Right-handed | Right-arm leg spin | |
| 37 | Courtney Sippel | (Australia) | 27 April 2001 | Left-handed | Right-arm medium | |
