= 2018–19 Brisbane Heat WBBL season =

Australian cricket team season

Brisbane Heat
2018–19 season
- Coach: Peter McGiffin
- Captain(s): Kirby Short
- Home ground: The Gabba
- League: WBBL
- Record: 9–5 (3rd)
- Finals: Champions
- Leading Run Scorer: Beth Mooney – 486
- Leading Wicket Taker: Delissa Kimmince – 22
- Player of the Season: Sammy-Jo Johnson

The 2018–19 Brisbane Heat Women's season was the fourth in the team's history. Coached by Peter McGiffin and captained by Kirby Short, the Heat finished third on the WBBL|04 ladder and qualified for the playoffs. In an "incredible" semi-final notable for a catch taken by Haidee Birkett on the last ball of the game, they defeated the Sydney Thunder to progress to their first championship decider appearance. In the final against the double-defending champions, the Sydney Sixers, Player of the Match Beth Mooney led an upset victory to secure Brisbane's maiden WBBL title.

== Squad ==
Each 2018–19 squad featured 15 active players, with an allowance of up to five marquee signings including a maximum of three from overseas. Under a new rule, Australian marquees were classed as players who held a national women's team contract at the time of signing on for their WBBL|04 team.

Personnel changes ahead of the season included:

- Holly Ferling, the Heat's first-ever player signing, departed the team and joined the Melbourne Stars.
- Barbadian marquee Deandra Dottin was not re-signed for another season.
- The resulting vacant marquee position was filled by South Africa's Suné Luus.
- Local teenage players Josie Dooley, Charli Knott and Courtney Sippel were added to the roster.

The table below lists the Heat players and their key stats (including runs scored, batting strike rate, wickets taken, economy rate, catches and stumpings) for the season.

No.	Name	Nat.	Birth date	Batting style	Bowling style	G	R	SR	W	E	C	S	Notes
Batters
3	Josie Dooley	(Australia)	21 January 2000	Right-handed	–	9	137	116.10	–	–	2	–	
1	Laura Harris	(Australia)	18 August 1990	Right-handed	–	16	141	143.87	–	–	2	–	
8	Charli Knott	(Australia)	5 May 2003	Right-handed	Right-arm medium	–	–	–	–	–	–	–	
10	Kirby Short	(Australia)	3 November 1986	Right-handed	Right-arm off spin	16	254	92.70	0	15.50	9	–	Captain
14	Laura Wolvaardt	(South Africa)	26 April 1999	Right-handed	–	14	67	126.41	–	–	8	–	Overseas marquee
All-rounders
17	Grace Harris	(Australia)	18 September 1993	Right-handed	Right-arm off spin	16	374	148.41	16	5.89	9	–	
58	Sammy-Jo Johnson	(Australia)	5 November 1992	Right-handed	Right-arm medium fast	16	260	139.78	20	6.15	0	–	
21	Jess Jonassen	(Australia)	5 November 1992	Left-handed	Left-arm orthodox	16	248	117.53	15	6.93	5	–	Australian marquee
37	Courtney Sippel	(Australia)	27 April 2001	Left-handed	Right-arm medium fast	–	–	–	–	–	–	–	
Wicket-keeper
6	Beth Mooney	(Australia)	14 January 1994	Left-handed	–	16	486	127.89	–	–	13	5	Australian marquee
Bowlers
15	Jemma Barsby	(Australia)	4 October 1995	Left-handed	Right-arm off spin	16	46	139.39	14	7.03	3	–	
23	Haidee Birkett	(Australia)	23 June 1996	Right-handed	Right-arm medium fast	12	15	115.38	5	6.76	6	–	
96	Suné Luus	(South Africa)	5 January 1996	Right-handed	Right-arm leg spin	9	27	87.09	5	7.05	2	–	Overseas marquee
11	Delissa Kimmince	(Australia)	14 May 1989	Right-handed	Right-arm medium	16	93	125.67	22	6.80	7	–	
16	Georgia Prestwidge	(Australia)	17 December 1997	Right-handed	Right-arm medium fast	4	6	75.00	0	7.80	0	–	

== Ladder ==
Pos	Team	Pld	W	L	NR	Pts	NRR
1	Sydney Sixers (RU)	14	10	4	0	20	0.509
2	Sydney Thunder	14	9	4	1	19	0.479
3	Brisbane Heat (C)	14	9	5	0	18	1.118
4	Melbourne Renegades	14	7	6	1	15	−0.079
5	Perth Scorchers	14	7	7	0	14	−0.476
6	Adelaide Strikers	14	5	8	1	11	−0.336
7	Melbourne Stars	14	5	8	1	11	−0.905
8	Hobart Hurricanes	14	2	12	0	4	−0.364

- The four top ranked teams qualified for the play-off phase

== Fixtures ==
All times are local time

=== Regular season ===
Match 3
2 December 2018
10:40
Scorecard

Adelaide Strikers; 7/172 (20 overs)	v	Brisbane Heat; 2/136 (20 overs)
Sophie Devine 89 (55); Jemma Barsby 2/23 (4 overs)		Beth Mooney 63* (57); Megan Schutt 1/23 (4 overs)

Adelaide Strikers won by 36 runs
CitiPower Centre, St Kilda
Umpires: Dale Ireland and Ben Treloar
Player of the match: Sophie Devine (Adelaide Strikers)

- Brisbane Heat won the toss and elected to field
- Broadcast by Seven Network and Fox Cricket

Match 8
8 December 2018
14:50
Scorecard

Perth Scorchers; 8/103 (20 overs)	v	Brisbane Heat; 3/104 (12.5 overs)
Elyse Villani 45 (55); Sammy-Jo Johnson 2/9 (4 overs)		Jess Jonassen 28* (17); Kate Cross 2/26 (2.5 overs)

Brisbane Heat won by 7 wickets (with 43 balls remaining)
North Sydney Oval No. 1
Umpires: Andrew Hamilton and Ben Treloar
Player of the match: Sammy-Jo Johnson (Brisbane Heat)

- Brisbane Heat won the toss and elected to field
- Broadcast by Seven Network and Fox Cricket

Match 12
9 December 2018
14:50
Scorecard

Sydney Thunder; 4/192 (20 overs)	v	Brisbane Heat; 164 (18.5 overs)
Harmanpreet Kaur 56 (26); Sammy-Jo Johnson 2/30 (4 overs)		Grace Harris 54 (28); Maisy Gibson 3/18 (3 overs)

Sydney Thunder won by 28 runs
North Sydney Oval No. 1
Umpires: David Shepard and Marc Nickl
Player of the match: Harmanpreet Kaur (Sydney Thunder)

- Sydney Thunder won the toss and elected to bat
- Broadcast by Seven Network and Fox Cricket

Match 19
16 December 2018
14:10
Scorecard

Brisbane Heat; 8/174 (20 overs)	v	Melbourne Renegades; 7/153 (20 overs)
Sammy-Jo Johnson 31 (10); Molly Strano 4/21 (4 overs)		Amy Satterthwaite 38 (33); Sune Luus 2/16 (2 overs)

Brisbane Heat won by 21 runs
Geelong Cricket Ground, Geelong
Umpires: Greg Azzopardi and Daryl Brigham
Player of the match: Molly Strano (Melbourne Renegades)

- Brisbane Heat won the toss and elected to bat

Match 21
19 December 2018
13:45
Scorecard

Melbourne Stars; 7/132 (20 overs)	v	Brisbane Heat; 0/138 (10.5 overs)
Angela Reakes 30 (30); Jess Jonassen 3/17 (4 overs)		Grace Harris 101* (42); Georgia Elwiss 0/8 (1 over)

Brisbane Heat won by 10 wickets (with 55 balls remaining)
The Gabba, Brisbane
Umpires: Steven Farrell and Stephen Dionysius
Player of the match: Grace Harris (Brisbane Heat)

- Melbourne Stars won the toss and elected to bat

Match 24
22 December
11:10
Scorecard

Sydney Sixers; 3/166 (20 overs)	v	Brisbane Heat; 7/155 (20 overs)
Ellyse Perry 103* (64); Delissa Kimmince 1/25 (4 overs)		Jess Jonassen 33 (27); Erin Burns 2/9 (2 overs)

Sydney Sixers won by 11 runs
Sydney Cricket Ground, Sydney
Umpires: Andrew Hamilton and Berend du Plessis
Player of the match: Ellyse Perry (Sydney Sixers)

- Sydney Sixers won the toss and elected to bat

Match 27
23 December
14:10
Scorecard

Brisbane Heat; 7/154 (20 overs)	v	Sydney Sixers; 88 (18 overs)
Sammy-Jo Johnson 51 (30); Erin Burns 3/20 (4 overs)		Dane van Niekerk 25 (33); Sammy-Jo Johnson 3/23 (4 overs)

Brisbane Heat won by 66 runs
Hurstville Oval, Sydney
Umpires: Roberto Howard and Berend du Plessis
Player of the match: Sammy-Jo Johnson (Brisbane Heat)

- Brisbane Heat won the toss and elected to bat

Match 30
26 December
22:45
Scorecard

Perth Scorchers; 5/136 (20 overs)	v	Brisbane Heat; 5/139 (19.2 overs)
Meg Lanning 70 (56); Haidee Birkett 3/19 (4 overs)		Beth Mooney 35 (28); Nicole Bolton 2/12 (4 overs)

Brisbane Heat won by 5 wickets (with 4 balls remaining)
Optus Stadium, Perth
Attendance:14,983
Umpires: Nathan Johnstone and Trent Steenholdt
Player of the match: Haidee Birkett (Brisbane Heat)

- Brisbane Heat won the toss and elected to field
- Broadcast by Seven Network and Fox Cricket
- Played as a double-header after a men's BBL match

Match 36
30 December
13:50
Scorecard

Brisbane Heat; 129 (19 overs)	v	Hobart Hurricanes; 5/133 (18.2 overs)
Grace Harris 23 (12); Meg Phillips 3/16 (4 overs)		Corinne Hall 48 (39); Grace Harris 3/23 (4 overs)

Hobart Hurricanes won by 5 wickets (with 10 balls remaining)
UTAS Stadium, Launceston
Umpires: Darren Close and Jeremiah Matibiri
Player of the match: Corinne Hall (Hobart Hurricanes)

- Hobart Hurricanes won the toss and elected to field
- Broadcast by Seven Network and Fox Cricket

Match 37
31 December
12:30
Scorecard

Brisbane Heat; 8/138 (20 overs)	v	Hobart Hurricanes; 80 (16.3 overs)
Josephine Dooley 44* (30); Meg Phillips 3/22 (4 overs)		Mikayla Hinkley 16 (25); Jess Jonassen 2/11 (3 overs)

Brisbane Heat won by 58 runs
UTAS Stadium, Launceston
Umpires: Muhammad Qureshi and Darren Close
Player of the match: Grace Harris (Brisbane Heat)

- Hobart Hurricanes won the toss and elected to field

Match 43
5 January
18:15
Scorecard

Brisbane Heat; 7/160 (20 overs)	v	Adelaide Strikers; 7/117 (20 overs)
Josephine Dooley 48* (33); Sophie Devine 2/15 (2 overs)		Sophie Devine 39 (37); Delissa Kimmince 3/21 (3 overs)

Brisbane Heat won by 43 runs
Harrup Park, Mackay
Attendance: 5,650
Umpires: Steven Farrell and David Taylor
Player of the match: Josephine Dooley (Brisbane Heat)

- Adelaide Strikers won the toss and elected to field
- The crowd of 5,650 set a new record for highest attendance at a standalone WBBL match

Match 46
6 January
15:00
Scorecard

Melbourne Renegades; 3/143 (20 overs)	v	Brisbane Heat; 118 (18.5 overs)
Sophie Molineux 50 (52); Sune Luus 1/24 (3 overs)		Beth Mooney 44 (31); Lea Tahuhu 3/13 (4 overs)

Melbourne Renegades won by 25 runs
Harrup Park, Mackay
Attendance: 2,563
Umpires: Steven Farrell and David Taylor
Player of the match: Sophie Molineux (Melbourne Renegades)

- Melbourne Renegades won the toss and elected to bat

Match 50
10 January
12:50
Scorecard

Melbourne Stars; 88 (19.5 overs)	v	Brisbane Heat; 3/91 (8.4 overs)
Mignon du Preez 27 (35); Delissa Kimmince 4/18 (3.5 overs)		Jess Jonassen 34* (14); Annabel Sutherland 1/23 (3 overs)

Brisbane Heat won by 7 wickets (with 68 balls remaining)
The Gabba, Brisbane
Umpires: David Taylor and Claire Polosak
Player of the match: Sammy-Jo Johnson (Brisbane Heat)

- Brisbane Heat won the toss and elected to field
- Broadcast by Seven Network and Fox Cricket

Match 53
12 January
18:15
Scorecard

Sydney Thunder; 7/171 (20 overs)	v	Brisbane Heat; 7/172 (19.3 overs)
Rachael Haynes 57 (51); Delissa Kimmince 2/23 (4 overs)		Beth Mooney 102 (55); Harmanpreet Kaur 2/23 (3 overs)

Brisbane Heat won by 3 wickets (with 3 balls remaining)
Cazaly's Stadium, Cairns
Attendance: 4,673
Umpires: Donovan Koch and Stephen Dionysius
Player of the match: Beth Mooney (Brisbane Heat)

- Brisbane Heat won the toss and elected to field

Responding to the Sydney Thunder's first innings total of 7/171, Heat opener Beth Mooney recorded her maiden WBBL century but was then dismissed in the 17th over. With Brisbane still requiring 19 runs off the last twelve balls, Harmanpreet Kaur—having already claimed two wickets, including the stumping of Mooney, for just ten runs—came on to bowl her third over. The Heat, primarily through Delissa Kimmince, scored 13 runs off the over to swing the momentum once more. Laura Harris then hit the winning runs against the bowling of Nicola Carey with three wickets in hand and three balls remaining, making it Brisbane's highest successful run chase. The result helped to set up a semi-final encounter between the two teams on the following weekend.

=== Knockout phase ===
Semi-final 1
19 January
10:40
Scorecard

Brisbane Heat; 7/140 (20 overs)	v	Sydney Thunder; 7/136 (20 overs)
Sammy-Jo Johnson 33 (26); Stafanie Taylor 1/13 (2 overs)		Rachel Priest 44 (33); Jemma Barsby 3/23 (2 overs)

Brisbane Heat won by 4 runs
Drummoyne Oval, Sydney
Umpires: David Shepard and Darren Close
Player of the match: Sammy-Jo Johnson (Brisbane Heat)

- Sydney Thunder won the toss and elected to field
- Broadcast by Seven Network and Fox Cricket

The lower-ranked Heat posted a first innings total of 7/140, recovering from 5/78 after 12 overs through an unbeaten knock of 32 from 25 by Laura Harris. After struggling through the middle overs of the run chase, a late charge by the Sydney Thunder brought the hosts back into the contest to leave a required five runs off the final delivery for victory. The last ball, sent down by spinner Jess Jonassen, was struck flat and cleanly to deep square leg by batter Nicola Carey. Jonassen immediately signalled disappointment as the ball set sail for beyond the boundary rope, therefore scoring six runs and clinching the match for Sydney... However, Brisbane fielder Haidee Birkett made enough ground in time to take a "miracle" catch just inside the field of play to knock the Thunder out of the tournament. The match, in conjunction with the other semi-final played later in the day, was hailed as a showcase of "the irrefutable rise of women's cricket" and "sport with drama, skill and unpredictability – a potent recipe for success".

Final
26 January
10:10
Scorecard

Sydney Sixers; 7/131 (20 overs)	v	Brisbane Heat; 7/132 (19.2 overs)
Ellyse Perry 33 (37); Grace Harris 3/23 (4 overs)		Beth Mooney 65 (46); Erin Burns 2/25 (4 overs)

Brisbane Heat won by 3 wickets (with 4 balls remaining)
Drummoyne Oval, Sydney
Attendance: 5,368
Umpires: David Shepard and Donovan Koch
Player of the match: Beth Mooney (Brisbane Heat)

- Sydney Sixers won the toss and elected to bat
- Broadcast by Seven Network and Fox Cricket
- Brisbane Heat won their first title

In front of the league's first-ever sellout crowd, the visiting Heat pulled off an upset victory to win their maiden championship and deny a Sydney Sixers three-peat. Requiring 34 runs with 36 balls remaining, Brisbane looked to be in control of the chase until the 15th over when Sydney leg spinner Dane van Niekerk struck twice—including the removal of linchpin Beth Mooney for 65 through a forward-diving catch by Ellyse Perry in the outfield. Although the Heat would continue to lose wickets, Laura Harris did enough to steady the ship, eventually hitting the winning runs with three wickets and four deliveries to spare. Player of the Final Mooney, who had been receiving on-field medical treatment for the flu and heat stroke, revealed in a post-match interview that her ongoing game delays instigated sledging from several opponents: "It was kind of nice to know while I wasn't feeling well, I was going well enough to piss them off and they were getting frustrated at how long I was taking to face up... I've played enough cricket against (the Sixers) to know what gets under their skin and we definitely won that battle."

== Statistics and awards ==
- Most runs: Beth Mooney – 486 (3rd in the league)
- Highest score in an innings: Beth Mooney – 102 (55) vs Sydney Thunder, 12 January 2019
- Most wickets: Delissa Kimmince – 22 (equal 1st in the league)
- Best bowling figures in an innings: Delissa Kimmince – 4/18 (3.5 overs) vs Melbourne Stars, 10 January 2019
- Most catches: Grace Harris, Kirby Short – 9 each (equal 2nd in the league)
- Player of the Match awards:
  - Sammy-Jo Johnson – 4
  - Grace Harris, Beth Mooney – 2 each
  - Haidee Birkett, Josie Dooley – 1 each
- Heat Most Valuable Player: Sammy-Jo Johnson
- WBBL|04 Player of the Tournament: Grace Harris (3rd), Sammy-Jo Johnson (equal 4th)
- WBBL|04 Team of the Tournament: Grace Harris, Sammy-Jo Johnson, Delissa Kimmince
- Player of the Final: Beth Mooney
