= 2020–21 Brisbane Heat WBBL season =

Australian cricket team season

Brisbane Heat
2020–21 season
- Coach: Ashley Noffke
- Captain(s): Jess Jonassen
- League: WBBL
- Record: 8–4 (2nd)
- Finals: Semi-finalists
- Leading Run Scorer: Georgia Redmayne – 357
- Leading Wicket Taker: Jonassen, Kerr – 17
- Player of the Season: Amelia Kerr

The 2020–21 Brisbane Heat Women's season was the sixth in the team's history. Coached by Ashley Noffke and captained by Jess Jonassen, the Heat entered WBBL|06 as the double defending champions, having won both WBBL|04 and WBBL|05 titles. Playing the entirety of the tournament in a bio-secure Sydney hub due to the COVID-19 pandemic, they finished the regular season with seven-straight wins to claim second position on the points table, qualifying for the knockout stage. In a "crazy" semi-final encounter with the Sydney Thunder, the Heat suffered an "epic meltdown" to lose by twelve runs and have their hopes of a three-peat dashed.

== Squad ==
Each 2020–21 squad was made up of 15 active players. Teams could sign up to five 'marquee players', with a maximum of three of those from overseas. Marquees were classed as any overseas player, or a local player who holds a Cricket Australia national contract at the start of the WBBL|06 signing period.

Personnel changes made ahead of the season included:

- Beth Mooney departed the Heat, signing with the Perth Scorchers.
- Sammy-Jo Johnson also departed, signing with the Sydney Thunder.
- Georgia Redmayne joined the Heat, departing the Scorchers.
- Nicola Hancock also joined the Heat, departing the Melbourne Stars.
- South African marquee player Nadine de Klerk signed with the Heat, marking her first appearance in the league.
- Jess Jonassen was appointed as the team's new captain, replacing Kirby Short who retired from cricket at the end of WBBL|05.

The table below lists the Heat players and their key stats (including runs scored, batting strike rate, wickets taken, economy rate, catches and stumpings) for the season.

No.	Name	Nat.	Birth date	Batting style	Bowling style	G	R	SR	W	E	C	S	Notes
Batters
5	Maddy Green	(New Zealand)	20 October 1992	Right-handed	Right-arm off spin	12	129	88.96	–	–	4	–	Overseas marquee
14	Mikayla Hinkley	(Australia)	1 May 1998	Right-handed	Right-arm off spin	3	1	50.00	–	–	0	–	
4	Laura Kimmince	(Australia)	18 August 1990	Right-handed	–	14	177	205.81	–	–	2	–	
88	Charli Knott	(Australia)	5 May 2003	Right-handed	Right-arm medium	8	21	72.41	2	5.33	1	–	
19	Georgia Voll	(Australia)	5 August 2003	Right-handed	Right-arm off spin	11	153	100.65	–	–	4	–	
All-rounders
32	Nadine de Klerk	(South Africa)	16 January 2000	Right-handed	Right-arm medium	9	89	117.10	3	6.43	2	–	Overseas marquee
17	Grace Harris	(Australia)	18 September 1993	Right-handed	Right-arm off spin	14	246	95.71	13	5.95	5	–	
21	Jess Jonassen	(Australia)	5 November 1992	Left-handed	Left-arm orthodox	14	231	111.05	17	6.52	6	–	Captain, Australian marquee
56	Lilly Mills	(Australia)	2 January 2001	Right-handed	Right-arm off spin	–	–	–	–	–	–	–	
Wicketkeeper
8	Georgia Redmayne	(Australia)	8 December 1993	Left-handed	–	14	357	118.60	–	–	11	7	
Bowlers
44	Nicola Hancock	(Australia)	8 November 1995	Right-handed	Right-arm medium fast	12	7	58.33	11	6.78	3	–	
48	Amelia Kerr	(New Zealand)	13 October 2000	Right-handed	Right-arm leg spin	14	97	97.00	17	5.32	2	–	Overseas marquee
11	Delissa Kimmince	(Australia)	14 May 1989	Right-handed	Right-arm medium	11	15	107.14	9	7.80	6	–	Australian marquee
16	Georgia Prestwidge	(Australia)	17 December 1997	Right-handed	Right-arm medium fast	11	8	72.72	7	7.13	8	–	
37	Courtney Sippel	(Australia)	27 April 2001	Left-handed	Right-arm medium fast	7	5	125.00	4	7.30	1	–	

== Ladder ==
Pos	Team	Pld	W	L	NR	Pts	NRR
1	Melbourne Stars (RU)	14	8	3	3	19	0.965
2	Brisbane Heat	14	8	4	2	18	0.543
3	Sydney Thunder (C)	14	7	5	2	16	0.344
4	Perth Scorchers	14	6	6	2	14	0.355
5	Sydney Sixers	14	6	6	2	14	−0.084
6	Adelaide Strikers	14	6	7	1	13	0.135
7	Melbourne Renegades	14	4	8	2	10	−1.008
8	Hobart Hurricanes	14	3	9	2	8	−1.143

- The top 4 teams advance to the play-off phase

== Fixtures ==
All times are local time

=== Regular season ===
Match 1
25 October 2020
10:20
Scorecard

Perth Scorchers; 7/132 (20 overs)	v	Brisbane Heat; 3/134 (17 overs)
Beth Mooney 37 (33); Nicola Hancock 2/25 (3 overs)		Grace Harris 53 (37); Heather Graham 1/14 (3 overs)

Brisbane Heat won by 7 wickets (with 18 balls remaining)
North Sydney Oval
Umpires: Nathan Johnstone and Greg Davidson
Player of the match: Grace Harris (Brisbane Heat)

- Brisbane Heat won the toss and elected to field
- Broadcast by Seven Network and Fox Cricket

Match 6
26 October 2020
09:30
Scorecard

Brisbane Heat	v	Melbourne Renegades

Match abandoned
Hurstville Oval
Umpires: David Taylor and Tony Wilds

- No toss
- No play was possible due to rain
- Broadcast by Cricket Network

Match 11
31 October 2020
15:40 (D/N)
Scorecard

Brisbane Heat; 2/80 (11 overs)	v	Hobart Hurricanes; 0/43 (4.3 overs)
Maddy Green 33 (24); Nicola Carey 1/11 (2 overs)		Chloe Tryon 26* (15)

No result
Sydney Showground Stadium
Umpires: Roberto Howard and Greg Davidson

- Hobart Hurricanes won the toss and elected to field
- Match was reduced to 11 overs per side due to rain delay
- Hobart Hurricanes were set a revised target of 106 from 11 overs
- No further play was possible due to rain
- Broadcast by Seven Network and Fox Cricket

Match 14
1 November 2020
10:20
Scorecard

Sydney Thunder; 3/80 (12.1 overs)	v	Brisbane Heat; 7/30 (5 overs)
Rachel Trenaman 38 (34); Nicola Hancock 1/9 (2.1 overs)		Jess Jonassen 14 (9); Heather Knight 3/4 (1 over)

Sydney Thunder won by 14 runs (DLS method)
Sydney Showground Stadium
Umpires: Roberto Howard and Tony Wilds
Player of the match: Samantha Bates (Sydney Thunder)

- Brisbane Heat won the toss and elected to field
- Sydney Thunder's innings reduced to 12.1 overs due to rain delay
- Brisbane Heat were set a revised target of 45 from 5 overs
- Broadcast by Seven Network and Fox Cricket

Match 20
4 November 2020
19:05 (D/N)
Scorecard

Sydney Sixers; 7/129 (20 overs)	v	Brisbane Heat; 105 (19 overs)
Ellyse Perry 54 (54); Jess Jonassen 4/28 (4 overs)		Nadine de Klerk 32 (23); Ellyse Perry 3/17 (4 overs)

Sydney Sixers won by 24 runs
Blacktown International Sportspark
Umpires: Jeremiah Matibiri and Greg Davidson
Player of the match: Ellyse Perry (Sydney Sixers)

- Sydney Sixers won the toss and elected to bat
- Broadcast by Fox Cricket and Cricket Network

Match 21
7 November 2020
12:15
Scorecard

Adelaide Strikers; 8/153 (20 overs)	v	Brisbane Heat; 8/135 (20 overs)
Katie Mack 50 (37); Jess Jonassen 2/25 (4 overs)		Georgia Redmayne 65 (47); Amanda-Jade Wellington 2/19 (3 overs)

Adelaide Strikers won by 18 runs
North Sydney Oval
Umpires: David Taylor and Jeremiah Matibiri
Player of the match: Katie Mack (Adelaide Strikers)

- Brisbane Heat won the toss and elected to field
- Broadcast by Seven Network and Fox Cricket

Match 27
8 November 2020
13:45
Scorecard

Melbourne Stars; 9/177 (20 overs)	v	Brisbane Heat; 8/154 (20 overs)
Meg Lanning 54 (25); Amelia Kerr 3/35 (4 overs)		Grace Harris 81* (52); Alana King 2/22 (4 overs)

Melbourne Stars won by 23 runs
North Sydney Oval
Umpires: Tony Wilds and Bede Sajowitz
Player of the match: Meg Lanning (Melbourne Stars)

- Brisbane Heat won the toss and elected to field
- Broadcast by Seven Network and Fox Cricket

Match 32
11 November 2020
19:05 (D/N)
Scorecard

Sydney Thunder; 9/111 (20 overs)	v	Brisbane Heat; 2/115 (16.3 overs)
Rachel Trenaman 27 (30); Amelia Kerr 4/20 (4 overs)		Georgia Redmayne 59* (45); Sammy-Jo Johnson 1/24 (3 overs)

Brisbane Heat won by 8 wickets (with 21 balls remaining)
Blacktown International Sportspark
Umpires: Troy Penman and Tony Wilds
Player of the match: Georgia Redmayne (Brisbane Heat)

- Sydney Thunder won the toss and elected to bat
- Broadcast by Fox Cricket and Cricket Network

Match 34
14 November 2020
14:30
Scorecard

Brisbane Heat; 7/136 (20 overs)	v	Adelaide Strikers; 7/122 (20 overs)
Laura Kimmince 41 (17); Amanda-Jade Wellington 4/24 (3 overs)		Tahlia McGrath 52 (62); Grace Harris 4/16 (3 overs)

Brisbane Heat won by 14 runs
Drummoyne Oval
Umpires: David Taylor and Sharad Patel
Player of the match: Laura Kimmince (Brisbane Heat)

- Adelaide Strikers won the toss and elected to field
- Broadcast by Cricket Network

Match 38
15 November 2020
14:30
Scorecard

Hobart Hurricanes; 82 (17.5 overs)	v	Brisbane Heat; 0/86 (11.4 overs)
Emma Thompson 19 (21); Jess Jonassen 2/8 (3 overs)		Georgia Redmayne 61* (33)

Brisbane Heat won by 10 wickets (with 50 balls remaining)
Drummoyne Oval
Umpires: Eloise Sheridan and Andrew Crozier
Player of the match: Georgia Redmayne (Brisbane Heat)

- Hobart Hurricanes won the toss and elected to bat
- Broadcast by Cricket Network
- Venue changed from Sydney Showground Stadium

Match 43
17 November 2020
14:30
Scorecard

Sydney Sixers; 7/122 (20 overs)	v	Brisbane Heat; 7/123 (17.5 overs)
Dane van Niekerk 31 (33); Grace Harris 2/13 (3 overs)		Jess Jonassen 34 (28); Marizanne Kapp 3/20 (4 overs)

Brisbane Heat won by 3 wickets (with 13 balls remaining)
Sydney Showground Stadium
Umpires: Steven Farrell and Tony Wilds
Player of the match: Grace Harris (Brisbane Heat)

- Sydney Sixers won the toss and elected to bat
- Broadcast by Fox Cricket and Cricket Network
- Venue changed from Blacktown International Sportspark

Match 45
18 November 2020
09:30
Scorecard

Perth Scorchers; 8/137 (20 overs)	v	Brisbane Heat; 6/139 (19.2 overs)
Beth Mooney 49 (39); Grace Harris 2/19 (3 overs)		Laura Kimmince 40* (17); Sarah Glenn 4/31 (4 overs)

Brisbane Heat won by 4 wickets (with 4 balls remaining)
Hurstville Oval
Umpires: Ben Treloar and Andrew Crozier
Player of the match: Laura Kimmince (Brisbane Heat)

- Brisbane Heat won the toss and elected to field
- Broadcast by Cricket Network

Match 49
21 November 2020
09:30
Scorecard

Melbourne Stars; 5/151 (20 overs)	v	Brisbane Heat; 7/152 (19.2 overs)
Mignon du Preez 51 (38); Grace Harris 2/8 (2 overs)		Georgia Redmayne 37 (32); Tess Flintoff 3/13 (3 overs)

Brisbane Heat won by 3 wickets (with 4 balls remaining)
Drummoyne Oval
Umpires: Steven Farrell and Greg Davidson
Player of the match: Laura Kimmince (Brisbane Heat)

- Brisbane Heat won the toss and elected to field
- Broadcast by Cricket Network

Match 56
22 November 2020
13:45
Scorecard

Brisbane Heat; 6/114 (17 overs)	v	Melbourne Renegades; 76 (16.2 overs)
Amelia Kerr 35* (26); Lea Tahuhu 2/16 (4 overs)		Amy Satterthwaite 14 (13); Georgia Prestwidge 4/12 (3.2 overs)

Brisbane Heat won by 43 runs (DLS method)
Drummoyne Oval
Umpires: David Taylor and Andrew Crozier
Player of the match: Georgia Prestwidge (Brisbane Heat)

- Melbourne Renegades won the toss and elected to field
- Match reduced to 17 overs per side due to rain delay
- Melbourne Renegades were set a revised target of 120 from 17 overs due to rain delay
- Broadcast by Cricket Network
- Match originally scheduled to begin at 14:30, start time brought forward by 45 minutes

=== Knockout phase ===
Semi-final 2
26 November 2020
19:10 (D/N)
Scorecard

Sydney Thunder; 6/143 (20 overs)	v	Brisbane Heat; 131 (18.3 overs)
Rachael Haynes 48* (44); Nadine de Klerk 2/11 (3 overs)		Laura Kimmince 37 (17); Hannah Darlington 3/19 (3 overs)

Sydney Thunder won by 12 runs
North Sydney Oval
Umpires: Eloise Sheridan and Tony Wilds
Player of the match: Hannah Darlington (Sydney Thunder)

- Brisbane Heat won the toss and elected to field
- Broadcast by Seven Network and Fox Cricket
- Former Australian player Delissa Kimmince made her last WBBL appearance

Tammy Beaumont launched the Sydney Thunder off to a fast start with 27 runs from 20 deliveries, though she was brought undone by a Nicola Hancock slower ball during the last over of the powerplay. The Thunder struggled throughout the middle portion of the innings, especially troubled by Brisbane Heat bowlers Nadine de Klerk and Amelia Kerr who collectively managed economical figures of 3/30 from seven overs. Instead of choosing to bowl the 20th over herself, Heat captain Jess Jonassen turned to the medium pace of Delissa Kimmince to close out the innings. Thunder captain Rachael Haynes ensured a respectable total for her team, finishing on 48 not out, as Sydney scored 15 from the final over and set Brisbane a target of 144 for victory.

Thunder spinner Samantha Bates struck early in the run chase, bowling Grace Harris for six, before being hit for three consecutive boundaries in the fourth over by Georgia Redmayne. Soon after playing-and-missing three times in a row to Shabnim Ismail, Redmayne was caught for 25 by Haynes at mid-on off the bowling of Sammy-Jo Johnson. Promoted up the batting order to number three, de Klerk formed a steady partnership with Jonassen, putting on 46 runs together in little more than six overs. When Jonassen fell for 19 (caught-and-bowled by Hannah Darlington) the Heat required a manageable task of 64 runs from 52 balls with seven wickets in hand. In the following over, de Klerk was run out by a direct hit from Beaumont for a run-a-ball 27. Facing her first delivery, Laura Kimmince survived an extremely close call, playing a flighted Bates delivery on to leg stump—the ball, however, did not connect with enough force to dislodge the bails. Kimmince quickly took advantage of her luck, manically compiling 37 runs from her next 15 balls. Although her aggressive strokeplay led to a plummeting required run rate, she was involved in two running-between-the-wickets mix-ups which led to the run outs of Georgia Voll and Amelia Kerr, keeping the door ajar for a miraculous Sydney comeback.

On the last delivery of the 17th over, with the Brisbane Heat needing just 16 runs to win, Laura Kimmince attempted a high-risk reverse slog against Samantha Bates, only to miss the ball which deflected off her thigh before crashing into the stumps—the bails, this time, were sent airborne. Taking the ball in the 18th over, Hannah Darlington struck twice in two balls to put the Heat in the precarious position of needing 14 runs with only one wicket in hand. Sammy-Jo Johnson completed the Thunder's remarkable resurrection on the third ball of the 19th over, removing Delissa Kimmince for a golden duck via caught-and-bowled, sealing a twelve-run victory and cementing Sydney's spot in Saturday's final. Brisbane's sudden "horror" collapse consisted of losing six wickets for twelve runs, ultimately ending their seven-match winning streak and quest for a three-peat. Media outlets described the match and its unlikely outcome as "chaotic," a "rollercoaster" and "one of the best comebacks in the WBBL's short history." Seven Network commentator Trent Copeland said "when Kimmince was flying you thought the game was gone," and Fox Cricket analyst Molly Strano commented "I don't think I've seen such massive swings in momentum in a game, ever."

== Statistics and awards ==
- Most runs: Georgia Redmayne – 357 (9th in the league)
- Highest score in an innings: Grace Harris – 81* (52) vs Melbourne Stars, 8 November
- Most wickets: Jess Jonassen, Amelia Kerr – 17 each (equal 6th in the league)
- Best bowling figures in an innings: Georgia Prestwidge – 4/12 (3.2 overs) vs Melbourne Renegades, 22 November
- Most catches: Georgia Prestwidge – 8 (equal 3rd in the league)
- Player of the Match awards:
  - Laura Kimmince – 3
  - Grace Harris, Georgia Redmayne – 2 each
  - Georgia Prestwidge – 1
- WBBL|06 Player of the Tournament: Grace Harris (equal 4th)
- WBBL|06 Team of the Tournament: Laura Kimmince, Ashley Noffke (coach)
- Heat Most Valuable Player: Amelia Kerr
