= 2024–25 Brisbane Heat WBBL season =

Women's Big Bash cricket season

Brisbane Heat
2024–25 season
- Coach: Mark Sorell
- Captain(s): Jess Jonassen
- Home ground: Allan Border Field
- League: WBBL

The 2024–25 Brisbane Heat Women's season was the team's 10th season of the Women's Big Bash League. They were coached by Mark Sorell and captained by Jess Jonassen. The team finished the regular season in 2nd and lost The Final to the Melbourne Renegades to finish runners-up.

== Squads ==
The 2024–25 season saw the second WBBL Draft held on 1 September 2024 for overseas players. One international pre-signing per team was allowed to combat availability issues.

- Nadine de Klerk was pre-signed by the Heat, while Indian pair Jemimah Rodrigues, who had previously played for the Melbourne Renegades and Melbourne Stars, and Shikha Pandey, were also selected in the draft.
- English international Lauren Winfield-Hill was also signed as a replacement player.
- Bonnie Berry, Lucinda Bourke, Sianna Ginger, and Mikayla Wrigley were the domestic players added to their squad.
- Local player Ruby Strange was also signed as a replacement player.
- New Zealand international Amelia Kerr, and domestic player Courtney Sippel both departed to the Sydney Sixers.
- Georgia Voll departed to the Sydney Thunder.
- Mikayla Hinkley departed to the Perth Scorchers.
- Ellie Johnston departed to the Adelaide Strikers.
- International players Mignon du Preez and Bess Heath did not return to the Heat, the former not nominating for the draft due to her pregnancy.

2024-25 Brisbane Heat Squad:

- Players with international caps are listed in **bold**.

No.	Name	Nat.	Birth date	Batting style	Bowling style	Notes
Batters
7	Lucinda Bourke	(Australia)	2 September 2005	Left-handed	Right-arm medium	
4	Laura Harris	(Australia)	18 August 1990	Right-handed	Right-arm medium	
14	**Jemimah Rodrigues**	(India)	5 September 2000	Right-handed	Right-arm off spin	Overseas Draft Pick (Platinum)
13	**Lauren Winfield-Hill**	(England)	16 August 1990	Right-handed	Right-arm medium	International Replacement Player
All-rounders
32	**Nadine de Klerk**	(South Africa)	16 January 2000	Right-handed	Right-arm medium	Overseas Draft Pick (Bronze)
11	Sianna Ginger	(Australia)	26 July 2005	Right-handed	Right-arm medium	
17	**Grace Harris**	(Australia)	18 September 1993	Right-handed	Right-arm off spin	
21	**Jess Jonassen**	(Australia)	5 November 1992	Left-handed	Left-arm orthodox	Captain
88	Charli Knott	(Australia)	29 November 2002	Right-handed	Right-arm off spin	
12	**Shikha Pandey**	(India)	12 May 1989	Right-handed	Right-arm medium	Overseas Draft Pick (Gold)
25	Ruby Strange	(Australia)	25 November 2002	Right-handed	Right-arm medium	Local Replacement Player
Wicket-keeper
8	Georgia Redmayne	(Australia)	8 December 1993	Left-handed	–	
43	Mikayla Wrigley	(Australia)	12 February 2004	Right-handed	–	
Bowlers
2	Bonnie Berry	(Australia)	24 February 2006	Right-handed	Right-arm medium	
5	Lucy Hamilton	(Australia)	5 August 2006	Left-handed	Left-arm fast	
44	Nicola Hancock	(Australia)	8 November 1995	Right-handed	Right-arm medium	
34	Grace Parsons	(Australia)	18 August 2003	Right-handed	Right-arm leg spin	

== Standing ==
Pos	Team	Pld	W	L	T	NR	Pts	NRR	
1	Melbourne Renegades (C)	10	7	3	0	0	14	0.527	Advance to the play-off phase
2	Brisbane Heat (R)	10	7	3	0	0	14	0.384	Advance to the play-off phase
3	Sydney Thunder (3rd)	10	6	3	0	1	13	−0.002	Advance to the play-off phase
4	Hobart Hurricanes (4th)	10	5	5	0	0	10	0.189	Advance to the play-off phase
5	Perth Scorchers	10	4	5	1	0	9	−0.171	
6	Sydney Sixers	10	3	5	1	1	8	−0.477	
7	Adelaide Strikers	10	3	6	0	1	7	−0.357	
8	Melbourne Stars	10	2	7	0	1	5	−0.205	

Source: ESPNcricinfo
(C) Champions; (R) Runners-up
