= Brisbane Heat (WBBL) =

Women's cricket team

- League: Women's Big Bash League

Personnel
- Captain: Georgia Redmayne
- Coach: Mark Sorell

Team information
- City: Brisbane
- Colours: Teal
- Home ground: Allan Border Field
- Secondary home ground: Great Barrier Reef Arena

History
- Twenty20 debut: 5 December 2015
- WBBL wins: 2 (2018–19, 2019–20)
- Official website: Brisbane Heat

The Brisbane Heat are an Australian women's Twenty20 cricket team based in Brisbane, Queensland. The Heat compete in the Women's Big Bash League and have won two championships, winning back-to-back titles across WBBL|04 and WBBL|05.

== History ==
=== Formation ===
One of eight founding WBBL teams, the Brisbane Heat are aligned with the men's team of the same name. On 24 June 2015, Queensland Cricket confirmed Andy Richards would be the Heat's inaugural coach. At the official WBBL launch on 10 July, Holly Ferling was unveiled as the team's first-ever player signing. Delissa Kimmince was appointed as Brisbane's inaugural captain.

The Heat played their first match against the Melbourne Stars on 5 December at the Junction Oval, losing by 20 runs. They won their first match on 12 December at Aquinas College in Perth, defeating the Sydney Sixers by 35 runs.

=== Rivalries ===
==== Sydney Thunder ====
The Heat have combined with the Sydney Thunder to produce several "thrillers", including:

- 12 January 2019, Cazalys Stadium: Responding to the Thunder's first innings total of 7/171, Heat opener Beth Mooney recorded her maiden WBBL century but was then dismissed in the 17th over. With the Heat still requiring 19 runs off the last twelve balls, Harmanpreet Kaur–having already claimed two wickets, including the stumping of Mooney, for just ten runs–came on to bowl her third over. The Heat, primarily through Delissa Kimmince, scored 13 runs off the over to swing the momentum once more. Laura Harris then hit the winning runs against the bowling of Nicola Carey with three wickets in hand and three balls remaining, making it Brisbane's highest successful run chase. The result helped to set up a semi-final encounter between the two teams on the following weekend.
- 19 January 2019, Drummoyne Oval: In the WBBL|04 semi-finals, the lower-ranked Heat posted a first innings total of 7/140. After struggling through the middle overs of the run chase, a late charge by the Thunder brought them back into the contest to leave a required five runs off the final delivery for victory. The last ball, sent down by spinner Jess Jonassen, was struck flat and cleanly to deep square leg by batter Nicola Carey. Jonassen immediately signalled disappointment as the ball set sail for beyond the boundary rope, therefore scoring six runs and clinching the match for the Thunder. However, Heat fielder Haidee Birkett made enough ground in time to take a "miracle" catch just inside the field of play to knock the Thunder out of the tournament. The match, in conjunction with the other semi-final played later in the day, was hailed as a showcase of "the irrefutable rise of women's cricket" and "sport with drama, skill and unpredictability – a potent recipe for success".
- 20 October 2019, North Sydney Oval: Thunder batters Alex Blackwell and Phoebe Litchfield set a new WBBL record for highest fourth-wicket partnership in their pursuit of the Heat's 9/150. The unbeaten 97-run stand, which got the Thunder over the line with seven balls to spare, was noted for the 20-year age gap between the two batting partners. At 16 years and 185 days, Litchfield also set a new WBBL record as the youngest player to score a half-century.

==== Sydney Sixers ====
The Heat share a "growing rivalry" with the Sydney Sixers. However, ahead of WBBL|05, Sixers wicket-keeper Alyssa Healy claimed "(Brisbane) have made a bit more of it than we have in the last 12 to 18 months, it’s not something we're thinking of too much." Noteworthy matches include:

- 26 January 2019, Drummoyne Oval: The Heat pulled off an upset victory in the WBBL|04 final to deny a Sixers three-peat, chasing down Sydney's total of 7/131 with just three wickets in hand and four balls remaining. Beth Mooney was named Player of the Final for her innings of 65 runs off 46 deliveries. Mooney, who had been receiving on-field medical treatment for the flu and heat stroke, revealed in a post-match interview that her ongoing game delays instigated sledging from several opponents: "It was kind of nice to know while I wasn't feeling well, I was going well enough to piss them off and they were getting frustrated at how long I was taking to face up... I've played enough cricket against (the Sixers) to know what gets under their skin and we definitely won that battle."
- 19 October 2019, North Sydney Oval: In their first match of the 2019–20 season, the Heat posted a total of 6/165 before bowling out the Sixers for just 73. The crushing 92-run deficit was the second-largest defeat for a chasing team in WBBL history, and also the Sixers' lowest-ever score.

==== Melbourne Renegades ====
Despite winning multiple championships in the league's early years, the Heat have relatively struggled against the Melbourne Renegades. Across the competition's first five seasons, the Renegades were the only team to beat the Heat more often than not. Noteworthy matches include:

- 23 December 2017, Docklands Stadium: Batting first, the Heat were bowled out for 66, equalling the WBBL record for lowest all out total. The Renegades chased the target down with ten wickets in hand and 55 balls remaining, also setting a new WBBL record for largest victory by a team batting second. (Note: The Heat would go on to equal this record by defeating the Melbourne Stars with 55 balls remaining in a 19 December 2018 match. The Heat then defeated the Stars with 68 balls remaining in a 10 January 2019 match, taking the record outright.)
- 27 November 2019, Allan Border Field: Targeting 184 runs to win, the Renegades set a new WBBL record for highest successful chase by sealing victory with six wickets in hand and six balls remaining.
- 7 December 2019, Allan Border Field: The Heat, on their way to a second consecutive title, chased down the Renegades' total of 4/163 with four wickets and twelve balls to spare in the first-ever semi-final encounter between the two teams. Wicket-keeper Josie Dooley, having won a championship with Brisbane in the previous season, top-scored for the Renegades with 50 not out.

==== Adelaide Strikers ====
Noteworthy matches between the Heat and the Adelaide Strikers include:

- 21 January 2017, The Gabba: Chasing a modest total of 6/127, the Strikers required three runs for victory with two balls remaining. Brisbane medium-pacer Deandra Dottin then bowled Tegan McPharlin before conceding two runs off the final delivery to force a tie. In the resulting Super Over, Dottin–who had earlier scored 51 runs with the bat–capped off a dominant all-round performance by taking two wickets and limiting Adelaide to just four runs. Beth Mooney scored the winning runs to secure the Heat's first finals appearance.
- 8 December 2019, Allan Border Field: In the WBBL|05 final, the Heat gained early ascendancy through quick bowler Georgia Prestwidge, who dismissed Player of the Tournament Sophie Devine for just five. A late "superb" knock of 55 runs from 33 balls by Amanda-Jade Wellington helped the Strikers to recover to a competitive score of 7/161. The match swung heavily toward Brisbane's favour in the fifth over of the run chase when Sammy-Jo Johnson hit four sixes against the bowling of Devine, though Johnson would be out caught-and-bowled on the last ball of the over. When Devine returned to bowl the eleventh over of the innings, Heat batter Jess Jonassen was dropped by Wellington at extra cover. Jonassen then scored a boundary from each of the next three deliveries she faced, taking Brisbane's required scoring rate down to less than a run a ball. Mirroring the climax of the previous season's decider against the Sixers, Laura Harris proceeded to hit the winning runs–this time with six wickets in hand and eleven balls remaining. For her contribution of 56 not out, Beth Mooney was again named Player of the Final as the Heat claimed a second consecutive championship.

== Captaincy records ==
There have been five captains in the Heat's history, including matches featuring an acting captain.

Captain	Span	M	Won	Lost	Tied	NR	W–L%
Delissa Kimmince	2015–17	22	11	11	0	0	50
Kirby Short	2017–19	53	34	19	0	0	64.15
Jess Jonassen	2020–25	81	43	33	0	5	56.58
Georgia Redmayne	2023–26	4	1	3	0	0	25
Charli Knott	2025	3	0	3	0	0	0

Source: (Note: ESPNcricinfo erroneously credited Jess Jonassen as captain for the Heat's match on 18 December 2015.)

== Season summaries ==
Chart of yearly table positions for Brisbane Heat in WBBL

Season	W–L	Pos.	Finals	Coach	Captain	Most Runs	Most Wickets	Most Valuable Player	Refs
2015–16	7–7	6th	DNQ	Andy Richards	Delissa Kimmince	Beth Mooney – 400	Delissa Kimmince – 17	Beth Mooney	
2016–17	8–6	3rd	SF	Andy Richards	Delissa Kimmince (Note: Kirby Short assumed the captaincy during the season.)	Beth Mooney – 482	Jess Jonassen – 17	Beth Mooney*	
2017–18	7–7	5th	DNQ	Peter McGiffin	Kirby Short	Beth Mooney – 465	Jemma Barsby – 13	Beth Mooney	
2018–19	9–5	3rd	C	Peter McGiffin	Kirby Short	Beth Mooney – 486	Delissa Kimmince – 22*	Sammy-Jo Johnson	
2019	10–4*	1st*	C	Ashley Noffke	Kirby Short	Beth Mooney – 743	Jess Jonassen – 21	Jess Jonassen	
2020	8–4	2nd	SF	Ashley Noffke	Jess Jonassen	Georgia Redmayne – 357	Jess Jonassen and Amelia Kerr – 17	Amelia Kerr	
2021	8–5	3rd	EF	Ashley Noffke	Jess Jonassen	Georgia Redmayne – 437	Jess Jonassen – 21	Grace Harris	
2022	8–5	3rd	CF	Ashley Noffke	Jess Jonassen	Georgia Redmayne – 354	Jess Jonassen – 25	Amelia Kerr	
2023	8–6	3rd	RU	Ashley Noffke	Jess Jonassen (Note: Georgia Redmayne stood in as acting captain for one game.)	Grace Harris – 501	Jess Jonassen – 24	Amelia Kerr	
2024	7–3	2nd	RU	Mark Sorell	Jess Jonassen	Grace Harris – 277	Jess Jonassen – 17	Jess Jonassen* (Note: Joint player of the tournament with Ellyse Perry.)	
2025	0–9	8th	DNQ	Mark Sorell	Jess Jonassen (Note: Charli Knott stood in as acting captain for three games.)	Nadine de Klerk – 158	Lucy Hamilton – 8	Nadine de Klerk	

Legend
DNQ	Did not qualify	SF	Semi-finalists	*	Led the league
EF	Lost the Eliminator	RU	Runners-up	^	League record
KF	Lost the Knockout	CF	Lost the Challenger	C	Champions

== Home grounds ==
Venue	Games hosted by season											
Venue	01	02	03	04	05	06	07	08	09	10	11	Total
Allan Border Field	1	4	2	–	5	N/A (Note: All WBBL|06 matches were played in Sydney due to the COVID-19 pandemic.)	–	3	5	4	4	28
Cazalys Stadium	–	–	–	1	–	N/A	–	–	–	–	–	1
The Gabba	4	2	1	2	–	N/A	–	–	–	1	–	10
Great Barrier Reef Arena	–	–	2	2	2	N/A	4	3	1	–	–	14

== Current squad ==
The squad of the Brisbane Heat for the WBBL|12 as of 6 November 2026.

- Players with international caps are listed in **bold**.
- * denotes a player who is unavailable for rest of the season.

No.	Name	Nat.	Birth Date	Batting Style	Bowling Style	Additional Info.
Batters
7	Lucy Bourke	Australia	2 September 2005 (age 21)	Right-handed	Right-arm medium	
18	Annie O'Neil	Australia	18 February 1999 (age 27)	Right-handed	Right-arm leg spin	
All-rounders
11	Sianna Ginger	Australia	26 July 2005 (age 21)	Right-handed	Right-arm fast-medium	
17	**Grace Harris**	Australia	18 September 1993 (age 33)	Right-handed	Right-arm off spin	
21	**Jess Jonassen**	Australia	5 November 1992 (age 34)	Left-handed	Left-arm orthodox	Ruled out through injury
88	Charli Knott	Australia	29 November 2002 (age 23)	Right-handed	Right-arm off spin	
84	**Orla Prendergast**	Ireland	1 June 2002 (age 24)	Right-handed	Right-arm medium	International Signing
Wicket-keepers
19	**Yastika Bhatia**	India	1 November 2000 (age 26)	Left-handed	—N/a	International Replacement Player
8	Georgia Redmayne	Australia	8 December 1993 (age 32)	Left-handed	—N/a	Captain
43	Mikayla Wrigley	Australia	12 February 2004 (age 22)	Right-handed	—N/a	
Bowlers
22	Lily Bassingthwaighte	Australia	25 March 2007 (age 19)	Right-handed	Right-arm fast-medium	
2	Bonnie Berry	Australia	24 February 2006 (age 20)	Right-handed	Right-arm fast-medium	
3	**Sarah Glenn**	England	27 August 1999 (age 27)	Right-handed	Right-arm leg spin	International Signing
5	**Lucy Hamilton**	Australia	5 August 2006 (age 20)	Left-handed	Left-arm fast	
34	Grace Parsons	Australia	18 August 2003 (age 23)	Right-handed	Right-arm leg spin	
6	**Aya Stafford**	Japan Australia	March 29, 2010 (age 16)	Right-handed	Right-arm leg spin	Local Replacement Player
15	Catherine White	Australia	July 4, 2007 (age 19)	Right-handed	Right-arm medium	

== Players ==
=== Australian representatives ===
The following is a list of cricketers who have played for the Heat after making their debut in the national women's team (the period they spent as both a Heat squad member and an Australian-capped player is in brackets):

- Holly Ferling (WBBL|01–03)
- Jodie Fields (WBBL|01)
- Grace Harris (WBBL|01, 03–12)
- Jess Jonassen (WBBL|01–12)
- Delissa Kimmince (WBBL|01–06)
- Megan White (WBBL|01)
- Beth Mooney (WBBL|02–05)
- Lucy Hamilton (WBBL|12)

=== Overseas marquees ===
- (England) Kate Cross (WBBL|01)
- (England) Lauren Winfield-Hill (WBBL|01–02, 10–11)
- (Cricket West Indies) Deandra Dottin (WBBL|02–03)
- (India) Smriti Mandhana (WBBL|02)
- (South Africa) Laura Wolvaardt (WBBL|03–04)
- (South Africa) Sune Luus (WBBL|04)
- (New Zealand) Maddy Green (WBBL|05–06)
- (New Zealand) Amelia Kerr (WBBL|05–06, 08–09)
- (South Africa) Nadine de Klerk (WBBL|06–07, 10–11)
- (South Africa) Anneke Bosch (WBBL|07)
- (India) Poonam Yadav (WBBL|07)
- (New Zealand) Jess Kerr (WBBL|08)
- (India) Pooja Vastrakar (WBBL|08)
- (England) Danni Wyatt-Hodge (WBBL|08)
- (South Africa) Mignon du Preez (WBBL|09)
- (England) Sarah Glenn (WBBL|09, 11–12)
- (England) Bess Heath (WBBL|09)
- (India) Shikha Pandey (WBBL|10)
- (India) Jemimah Rodrigues (WBBL|10–11)
- (Cricket West Indies) Chinelle Henry (WBBL|11)
- (India) Yastika Bhatia (WBBL|12)
- (Ireland) Orla Prendergast (WBBL|12)

=== Associate rookies ===
- (Papua New Guinea) Norma Ovasuru (WBBL|01)
- (China) Li Yingying (WBBL|02)
- (Bangladesh) Rumana Ahmed (WBBL|03)

== Honours ==
- Champions: 2 – WBBL|04, WBBL|05
- Runners-Up: 2 – WBBL|09, WBBL|10
- Minor Premiers: 1 – WBBL|05
- Finals Appearances: 8 – WBBL|02, WBBL|04, WBBL|05, WBBL|06, WBBL|07, WBBL|08, WBBL|09, WBBL|10
- Wooden Spoons: 1 – WBBL|11

== Statistics and awards ==
=== Team stats ===
- Win–loss record:

Opposition	M	Won	Lost	Tied	NR	W–L%
Adelaide Strikers	27	15	12	0	0	55.56
Hobart Hurricanes	21	14	6	0	1	70
Melbourne Renegades	22	11	10	0	1	52.38
Melbourne Stars	21	11	8	0	2	57.89
Perth Scorchers	23	12	11	0	0	52.17
Sydney Sixers	23	13	9	0	1	59.09
Sydney Thunder	26	13	13	0	0	50
Total	163	89	69	0	5	56.33

- Highest score in an innings: 7/229 (20 overs) vs Perth Scorchers, 22 October 2023
- Highest successful chase: 7/172 (19.3 overs) vs Sydney Thunder, 12 January 2019
- Lowest successful defence: (Note: Excluding shortened matches) 6/127 (20 overs) vs Adelaide Strikers, 21 January 2017
- Largest victory:
  - Batting first: 92 runs vs Sydney Sixers, 19 October 2019
  - Batting second: 68 balls remaining vs Melbourne Stars, 10 January 2019
- Longest winning streak: 7 matches, twice (3–22 November 2019 and 11–22 November 2020)
- Longest losing streak: 12 matches (1 December 2024 – 1 November 2026)

=== Individual stats ===
- Most runs: Grace Harris – 2,904
- Highest score in an innings: Grace Harris – 136 (59) vs Perth Scorchers, 22 October 2023
- Highest partnership: Grace Harris and Georgia Redmayne – 165 vs Melbourne Renegades, 18 October 2022
- Most wickets: Jess Jonassen – 184
- Best bowling figures in an innings: Lucy Hamilton – 5/8 (4 overs) vs Melbourne Stars, 17 November 2024
- Most catches (fielder): Grace Harris – 61
- Most dismissals (wicket-keeper): Georgia Redmayne – 84 (51 catches, 33 stumpings)

=== Individual awards ===
- Player of the Match:
  - Beth Mooney – 16
  - Grace Harris – 12
  - Jess Jonassen – 10
  - Amelia Kerr and Georgia Redmayne – 7
  - Laura Harris – 6
  - Sammy-Jo Johnson and Charli Knott – 4
  - Deandra Dottin – 3
  - Grace Parsons and Georgia Voll – 2
  - Jemma Barsby, Haidee Birkett, Josie Dooley, Mignon du Preez, Holly Ferling, Lucy Hamilton, Ellie Johnston, Georgia Prestwidge, Jemimah Rodrigues, Kirby Short, Courtney Sippel, and Lauren Winfield-Hill – 1
- WBBL Player of the Final:
  - Beth Mooney (2) – WBBL|04, WBBL|05
- WBBL Player of the Tournament:
  - Beth Mooney – WBBL|02
  - Jess Jonassen – WBBL|10
- WBBL Team of the Tournament:
  - Jess Jonassen (4) – WBBL|02, WBBL|05, WBBL|07, WBBL|08
  - Beth Mooney (4) – WBBL|01, WBBL|02, WBBL|03, WBBL|05
  - Grace Harris (2) – WBBL|04, WBBL|07
  - Georgia Redmayne (2) – WBBL|07, WBBL|08
  - Sammy-Jo Johnson – WBBL|04
  - Delissa Kimmince – WBBL|04
  - Laura Harris – WBBL|06
  - Nicola Hancock – WBBL|08
  - Amelia Kerr – WBBL|08
  - Charli Knott – WBBL|09
  - Shikha Pandey – WBBL|10
- WBBL Young Gun Award:
  - Charli Knott – WBBL|09
  - Lucy Hamilton – WBBL|11

== Sponsors ==
Year	Kit Manufacturer	Chest Sponsor	Back Sponsor	Breast Sponsor	Sleeve Sponsor
2015–16	Majestic	Rebel	Epic Pharmacy	Epic Pharmacy	Rebel
2016–17	Majestic	Rebel	CUA	Epic Pharmacy	Rebel
2017–18	Majestic	Rebel	CUA	Epic Pharmacy	Rebel
2018–19	Majestic	CUA	CUA	Betta	Rebel
2019–20	Majestic	CUA	CUA	Betta	BCF
2020–21	Majestic	CUA	CUA	Betta	Rebel
2021–22	Nike	Great Southern Bank	Great Southern Bank	Betta	National Storage
2022–23	Nike	Great Southern Bank	Great Southern Bank	Betta	National Storage
2023–24	Nike	Great Southern Bank	Great Southern Bank	Betta	National Storage
2024–25	Nike	Queensland Country Bank	Queensland Country Bank	Poolwerx	National Storage
2025–26	New Balance	Queensland Country Bank	Queensland Country Bank	Poolwerx	National Storage

== See also ==
- Queensland Cricket
- Queensland Fire
