= Peter McGiffin =

Australian cricket coach

Personal information
- Born: Queensland, Australia
- Role: Coach

Domestic team information
- Years: Team
- ?–?: North Queensland
- 2002–2004: Northchurch

Head coaching information
- Years: Team
- ?–?: Northchurch
- 2017–2019: Queensland Fire
- 2017–2019: Brisbane Heat

Peter McGiffin is an Australian cricket coach and former player, who has previously been head coach of the Queensland Fire and Brisbane Heat women's cricket team. Whilst head coach of Brisbane Heat, the team won the 2018–19 Women's Big Bash League. As a player, McGiffin represented North Queensland and Northchurch Cricket Club in England.

== Career ==
McGiffin was a player for North Queensland cricket team, where he was an opening batsman. He also worked as a physical education teacher. He played for Northchurch Cricket Club in England from 2002 to 2004. He later coached the team. McGfiffin has also worked as a director of coaching at Mackay Cricket Association, and as a coach of Mackay-Whitsunday Nitros.

In 2014, he was hired by Queensland Cricket as a talent officer. He later worked as the coach of the Queensland under-18s cricket team, and as an assistant coach to both the Queensland Fire and Brisbane Heat women's cricket teams. In 2017, he became head coach of both Queensland Fire and Brisbane Heat. In 2018, McGiffin coached Brisbane Heat to victory in the 2018–19 Women's Big Bash League; it was the first time that a team from outside Sydney had won the Women's Big Bash League. In the same season, he coached Queensland Fire to second in the 2018–19 Women's National Cricket League.

In February 2019, McGiffin left his roles at Queensland Fire and Brisbane Heat for personal reasons. He was replaced by Ashley Noffke as head coach of Brisbane Heat.

== Personal life ==
His son Steve has played cricket for Wests Plus Cricket Academy, and for Northchurch Cricket Club. His daughter Tenika played tennis for the University of Tennessee.
