= Queensland Country Bank =

Australian commercial bank

- Industry: Finance
- Founded: 1971
- Area served: Australia
- Key people: Aaron Newman (CEO)
- Products: Banking, financial and related services

Queensland Country Bank is an Australian bank headquartered in Townsville.

== Corporate history ==
It was inaugurated as Isa Mine Employees' Credit Union Limited in Mount Isa in 1971. The bank holds the naming rights of Queensland Country Bank Stadium and it also maintains a partnership with North Queensland Cowboys, a prominent club which plays in the National Rugby League.

In July 2024, the bank signed up as the principal sponsor of Brisbane Heat ahead of the 2023–24 Big Bash League season for a duration of three years.

In December 2024, Queensland Country Bank acquired a 3,044 sqm commercial building in Adelaide Street, in Brisbane's CBD from Colliers Queensland, culminating in a landmark $19,000,000 deal.
