= Lucy Hamilton (cricketer) =

Australian cricketer

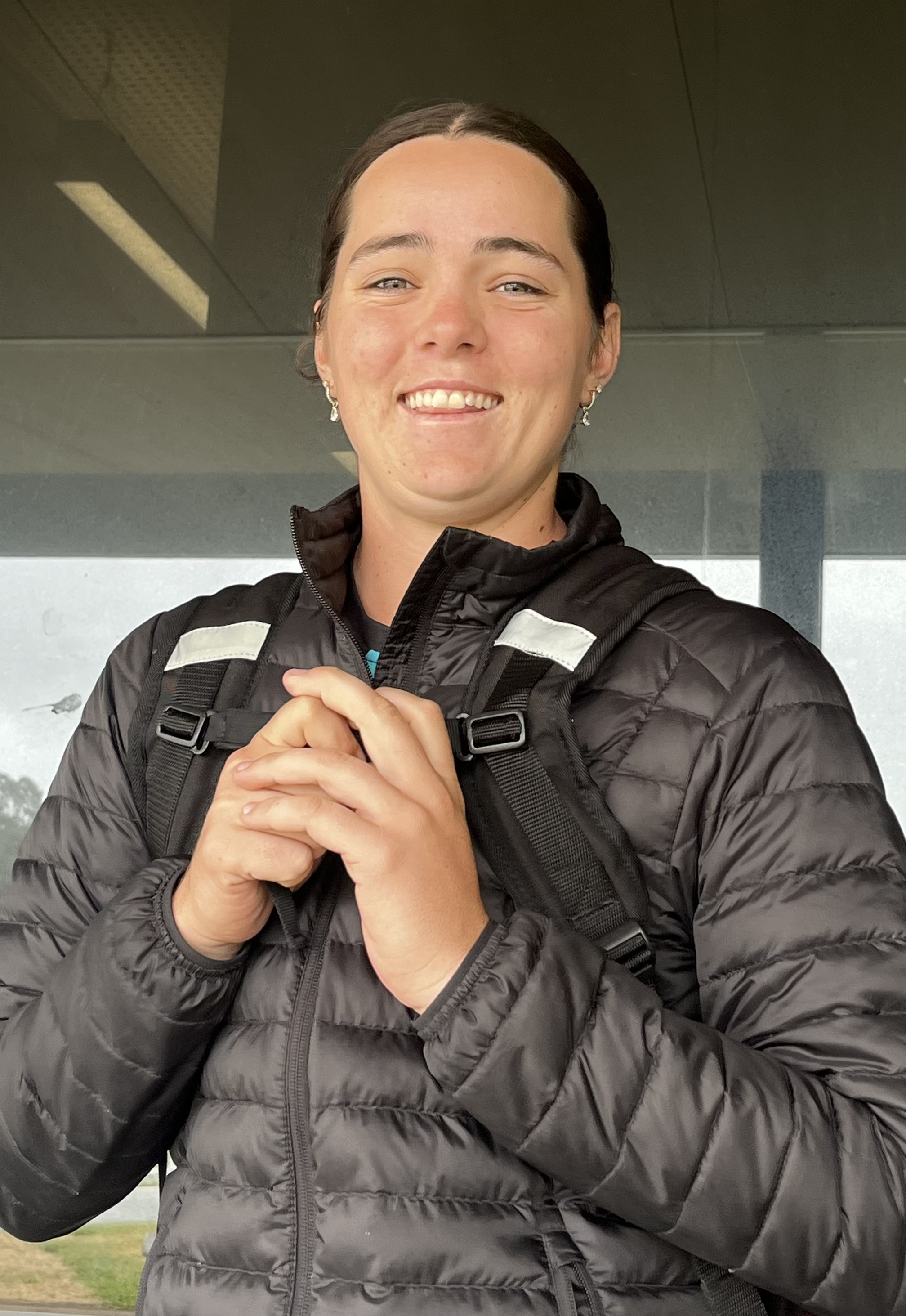
- Hamilton in October 2025

Personal information
- Full name: Lucy Kay Hamilton
- Born: 8 May 2006 (age 20); Bundaberg, Queensland, Australia
- Batting: Left-handed
- Bowling: Left-arm fast
- Role: All-rounder

International information
- National side: Australia (2026—present)
- Only Test (cap 186): 6 March 2026 v India
- ODI debut (cap 151): 1 March 2026 v India
- Last ODI: 2 April 2026 v West Indies
- T20I debut (cap 62): 23 March 2026 v West Indies
- Last T20I: 5 July 2026 v England

Domestic team information
- Years: Team
- 2021/22–present: Queensland
- 2022/23–present: Brisbane Heat
- 2026: Delhi Capitals

Career statistics
Competition	WODI	WT20I
Matches	2	6
Runs scored	–	–
Batting average	–	–
100s/50s	–/–	–/–
Top score	–	–
Balls bowled	78	96
Wickets	1	2
Bowling average	68.00	39.50
5 wickets in innings	0	0
10 wickets in match	0	0
Best bowling	1/22	1/11
Catches/stumpings	1/–	1/–
Medal record
Women's cricket
Representing Australia
ICC T20 World Cup
Winner	2026 England & Wales
- Source: ESPNcricinfo, 5 July 2026

Lucy Kay Hamilton (born 8 May 2006) is an Australian cricketer who plays as a left-arm fast bowler for Queensland in the Women's National Cricket League (WNCL) and Brisbane Heat in the Women's Big Bash League (WBBL).

== Domestic career ==
Hamilton plays grade cricket for Sunshine Coast Scorchers. She made her debut for Queensland on 15 March 2022, becoming the second youngest debutant ever for the side, aged 15. She took two wickets on debut, against Western Australia in the WNCL. She played one more match in the competition, without taking a wicket. In 2022–23, Hamilton played two matches for Brisbane Heat in the WBBL.

== International career ==
In December 2022, Hamilton was selected in the Australia Under-19 squad for the 2023 ICC Under-19 Women's T20 World Cup. She took five wickets at an average of 10.80 at the tournament, including taking 2/0 from one over against Sri Lanka.

== Honours ==
Delhi Capitals

- Women's Premier League runner-up: 2026

Australia

- Women's T20 World Cup: 2026
