= Grace Parsons =

Australian cricketer

Personal information
- Full name: Grace E Parsons
- Born: 18 August 2003 (age 23)
- Batting: Right-handed
- Bowling: Right-arm leg break
- Role: Bowler

Domestic team information
- Years: Team
- 2021/22–present: Queensland
- 2024/25: Brisbane Heat

Career statistics
Competition	FC	LA	T20
Matches	1	37	15
Runs scored	70	72	20
Batting average	35.00	7.20	6.66
100s/50s	0/0	0/0	0/0
Top score	35	14	11*
Balls bowled	174	1,664	312
Wickets	2	55	21
Bowling average	39.00	22.16	16.61
5 wickets in innings	0	0	0
10 wickets in match	0	0	0
Best bowling	2/37	4/33	4/30
Catches/stumpings	1/–	19/–	3/–
- Source: CricketArchive, 7 August 2025

Grace E Parsons (born 18 August 2003) is an Australian cricketer who plays as a right-arm leg break bowler for Queensland in the Women's National Cricket League (WNCL) and Brisbane Heat in the Women's Big Bash League (WBBL).

== Domestic career ==
Parsons plays grade cricket for Gold Coast District Cricket Club. She made her debut for Queensland on 6 March 2022, against South Australia in the WNCL, taking 4/33 from her 7 overs. She went on to play six matches overall for the side that season, taking 6 wickets at an average of 31.33. She played 10 matches for the side in the 2022–23 Women's National Cricket League season, and was the side's second-leading wicket-taker, with 15 wickets at an average of 20.66. Against South Australia on 17 February 2023, she took 4/40 from her ten overs. She was also included in the Brisbane Heat squad in the Women's Big Bash League, but did not play a match.
