= Sunshine Coast Cricket Club =

Australian cricket club

Sunshine Coast Scorchers
- Nickname: Scorchers
- League: Queensland Premier Cricket

Personnel
- Captain: (Australia) Alecz Day
- Coach: (Australia) Ashley Holznagel

Team information
- Colours: Red, Gold, White
- Founded: 1990
- Home ground: John Blank Oval
- Capacity: 5,000

History
- Grade wins: 1
- 1-Day wins: 1
- T20 wins: 0
- Official website: sunshinecoastcricket.com

The Sunshine Coast Cricket Club is a cricket club on the Sunshine Coast, Queensland, Australia. They play in the Queensland Premier Cricket competition. They were founded in 1990.

== See also ==
- Cricket in Queensland
