= Harrup Park =

Multi-sports complex in Mackay, Queensland

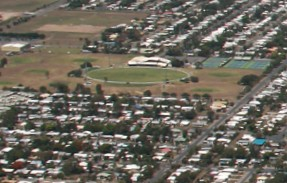
- Harrup Park in December 2009
- Interactive map of Harrup Park
- Address: Juliet St; South Mackay, Queensland
- Coordinates: 21°09′34.03″S 149°11′10.58″E
- Capacity: 10,000

Construction
- Opened: September 1948; 78 years ago

Tenants
- Queensland cricket team (1998–); Brisbane Heat (WBBL) (2018–); Gold Coast Suns (AFLW) (2020–)

Ground information
- Only men's Test: 22–23 August 2026: Australia v Bangladesh
- First men's ODI: 28 February 1992: India v Sri Lanka
- Last men's ODI: 24 August 2025: Australia v South Africa
- First women's ODI: 21 September 2021: Australia v India
- Last women's ODI: 26 September 2021: Australia v India
- First women's T20I: 19 September 2024: Australia v New Zealand
- Last women's T20I: 22 September 2024: Australia v New Zealand
- As of 23 August 2026; Source: Cricinfo

Harrup Park is a multi-sports complex located in the Queensland city of Mackay. It includes multiple ovals for Australian rules football and cricket, as facilities for athletics, tennis, croquet, basketball and table tennis.

The main oval at the venue is Ray Mitchell Oval (known under naming rights as Great Barrier Reef Arena), which has hosted AFL Women's (AFLW) and Women's Big Bash League (WBBL) matches. The venue hosted its first international men's Test cricket match in August 2026.

== History ==
Harrup Park was owned and developed by the Mackay Cricket Association in the 1940s. It was named after Mr A. L. Harrup, the president of the association at the time, and the main ground was named after the vice-president, Ray Mitchell, who was also one of the people who bought the land for the development. The ground was officially opened in September 1948.

Ray Mitchell Oval was renamed Great Barrier Reef Arena under a naming rights agreement in 2018. The ground and its facilities were extensively redeveloped and enlarged as part of the Queensland government's COVID-19 Economic Recovery Plan, beginning in 2021.

== Australian rules football ==
On 19 September 2018, the Gold Coast Suns announced a four-year deal with the Mackay Council to play AFL Women's matches at Harrup Park between 2019–2022.

== Domestic cricket matches ==
The first major match on the ground occurred when the Queensland Country XI played against the touring West Indians in 1968, with Rohan Kanhai scoring 206 runs on the second day. In 1978, the ground staged a single World Series Cricket "Country Cavaliers" match.

The ground held its first two List A one day matches in 1988, when Queensland played the touring Pakistanis on 3 and 4 December 1988.

The first first-class match to be played there came in 1995 when Queensland played against the touring Sri Lankans, with the match ending in a 273 run victory for Queensland, with Michael Kasprowicz taking match figures of 12/95. The second first-class game, and first Sheffield Shield game, came in 2015 when New South Wales defeated Queensland in a close contest by 3 wickets. Queensland opener Matt Renshaw top scored with 170, and New South Wales spinner Will Somerville collected 7 wickets. A List A match was played there in October 2011 between Queensland and Tasmania in the 2011/12 Ryobi One Day Cup. The ground was then host to a 2016 Quadrangular series between Australia A, India A, South Africa A and Australia's National Performance Squad, which was won by India A.

Brisbane Heat from the Women's Big Bash Cricket League played six home games at Mackay in 2018 and 2019.

Great Barrier Reef Arena hosted nine WBBL games from 13 November 2021 to 20 November 2021, with six teams competing in two consecutive "festival rounds".

== International cricket matches ==
The ground hosted a One Day International match during the 1992 Cricket World Cup, with India and Sri Lanka playing on 28 February. The match was abandoned after two deliveries due to torrential rain, despite the best efforts of the groundstaff to dry the outfield. This was the debut match of Ajay Jadeja.

In 2021, the venue was selected to host three Women's One Day International matches between Australia and India, the first of which was played on 21 September 2021.

In 2025, the ground hosted two ODIs between Australia and South Africa, 33 years after its first.

On 24 February 2026, Cricket Australia announced that the ground would become the 12th Test Venue in Australia, with the hosts playing Bangladesh in a two-test series with the other game occurring in Darwin.

=== Test five-wicket hauls ===
As of August 2026, two Test five-wicket hauls have been taken at the venue.

| No. | Figures | Player | Team | Opposing team | Date | Result |
|---|---|---|---|---|---|---|
| 1 | 6/12 | Mitchell Starc | Australia | Bangladesh | 22 August 2026 | Australia won |
| 2 | 7/48 | Shoriful Islam | Bangladesh | Australia | 22 August 2026 | Australia won |

=== ODI centuries ===
As of August 2025, three ODI centuries have been scored in Mackay.

| No. | Score | Player | Team | Balls | Innings | Opposing team | Date | Result |
|---|---|---|---|---|---|---|---|---|
| 1 | 142 | Travis Head | Australia | 103 | 1 | South Africa | 24 August 2025 | Australia won |
| 2 | 100 | Mitchell Marsh | Australia | 106 | 1 | South Africa | 24 August 2025 | Australia won |
| 3 | 118* | Cameron Green | Australia | 55 | 1 | South Africa | 24 August 2025 | Australia won |

As of September 2021, one WODI century has been scored in Mackay.

| No. | Score | Player | Team | Balls | Innings | Opposing team | Date | Result |
|---|---|---|---|---|---|---|---|---|
| 1 | 125* | Beth Mooney | Australia | 133 | 2 | India | 24 September 2021 | Australia won |

=== ODI five-wicket hauls ===
As of August 2025, two ODI five-wicket hauls have been taken at the venue.

| No. | Figures | Player | Team | Opposing team | Date | Result |
|---|---|---|---|---|---|---|
| 1 | 5/42 | Lungi Ngidi | South Africa | Australia | 22 August 2025 | South Africa won |
| 2 | 5/22 | Cooper Connolly | Australia | South Africa | 24 August 2025 | Australia won |
