= Georgia Redmayne =

Australian cricketer

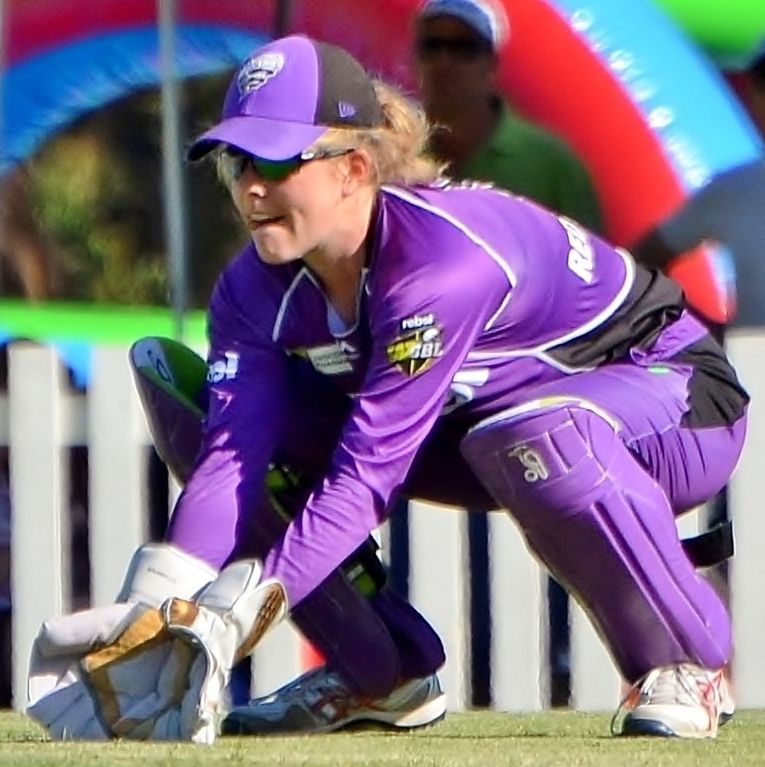
- Redmayne keeping for the Hobart Hurricanes

Personal information
- Full name: Georgia Prue Redmayne
- Born: 8 December 1993 (age 32); Lismore, New South Wales, Australia
- Batting: Left-handed
- Role: Wicket-keeper-batter

Domestic team information
- Years: Team
- 2012: Worcestershire
- 2014/15–2015/16: New South Wales
- 2016/17–2018/19: Tasmania
- 2016/17–2018/19: Hobart Hurricanes
- 2019/20–present: Queensland
- 2019/20: Perth Scorchers
- 2020/21–present: Brisbane Heat
- 2021: Welsh Fire
- 2024: South East Stars
- 2024-present: London Spirit

Career statistics
Competition	WLA	WT20
Matches	84	184
Runs scored	3,363	3,974
Batting average	50.19	26.14
100s/50s	9/19	0/23
Top score	134*	98*
Catches/stumpings	78/33	87/61
- Source: CricketArchive, 6 January 2026

Georgia Prue Redmayne (born 8 December 1993) is an Australian cricketer who plays as a wicket-keeper-batter for Queensland Fire and Brisbane Heat. She has also previously played for Worcestershire, New South Wales Breakers, Tasmania, Hobart Hurricanes, Perth Scorchers and Welsh Fire.

== Early life ==
Born in Lismore, New South Wales, and raised in nearby Alstonville, Redmayne was the youngest of three children, and became a cricketer at an early age. She played backyard cricket against her elder brother, and her dentist father was a local coach who encouraged girls to play for boys' teams. In February 2005, she caused a stir when she took a double hat-trick (four wickets in four deliveries) for the Alstonville Maroon Under-12s. By then, she had already represented North Coast PSSA cricket team in two State carnivals; she later played NSW State underage cricket in the Under-15s, Under-17s, and Under-18s.

While a student at Alstonville High School, Redmayne played for Combined High Schools. She broke almost every CHS girls' cricket batting record, won player of the carnival in her final two school years, and captained the CHS Firsts. At the age of 16, she and her father played men's second grade together. In 2012, after gaining an ATAR score of 99.75, she took a gap year, organised by Stan Gilchrist, one of her coaches and father of former Australian wicketkeeper Adam Gilchrist, to play cricket for Worcestershire in England. In her first innings on English soil, she scored a century.

== Domestic and franchise career ==
=== New South Wales Breakers ===
In August 2014, Redmayne was added to the New South Wales Breakers squad for the 2014–15 season. She made her Women's National Cricket League debut for the Breakers in the 2014–15 WNCL Final.

In the 2015–16 season, playing for Universities in the McDonald's Sydney Women's Grade competition, Redmayne won the First Grade Player of the Year award. With a batting aggregate for the regular season of 656 runs at an average of 82.00, she scored nearly 200 runs more than the next best batter, and she was also part of the Universities team that won the Club Championship. However, she was denied more exposure to top-class cricket in NSW because of the presence of Australian 'keeper Alyssa Healy, to whom she was deputy.

=== Tasmanian Roar and Hobart Hurricanes ===
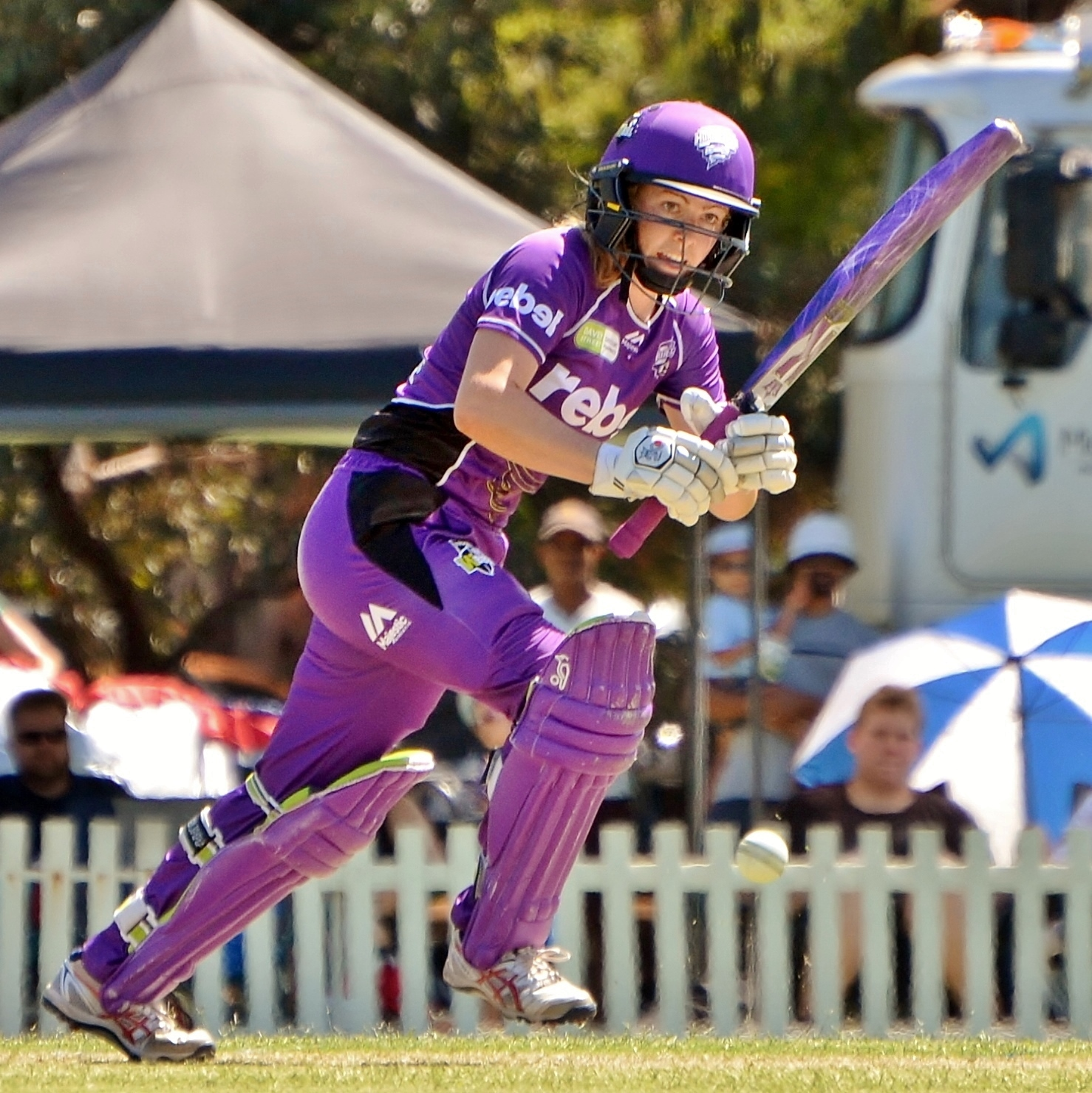
Redmayne batting for the Hobart Hurricanes during WBBL|03

In May 2016, Redmayne, who had been contemplating retirement, was recruited by Tasmanian Roar for the 2016–17 WNCL season. The Roar's coach, Julia Price, told The Examiner that Redmayne would be able to assist the Roar's captain and vice-captain with field settings and tactics, and strengthen the batting order. In July 2016, Redmayne also joined Hobart Hurricanes for its WBBL|02 campaign.

Redmayne's move from the Breakers to the Roar soon paid off spectacularly. In October 2016, she became the first player for Tasmania to hit a WNCL century, which helped the Roar to a thrilling final-ball win against the ACT Meteors. She was immediately rewarded with an embrace by her 87-year-old grandfather, who had been watching the game and vaulted the fence in his excitement.

The following month, Redmayne backed up that effort with a 116-run score against Western Fury; the Roar also won that match, by six wickets. Redmayne finished the 2016–17 season as the fourth-highest run scorer of the WNCL competition, with 295 runs in six matches at an average of 59. She also took three catches and made seven stumpings. In the ensuing WBBL|02 tournament, she took seven catches, made five stumpings and scored 278 runs at an average of 23. In March 2017, she was named in the Shooting Stars squad for its March–April 2017 tour of Sri Lanka.

Redmayne remained with the Roar and the Hurricanes for the 2017–18 season. During her first WNCL match of that season, she scored 89 against the Western Fury. At the end of the season, she won the Betty Wilson Young Women's Cricketer of the Year award for Australia's most promising rising player. The award was founded on a vote by Australian-based international, state and WBBL-contracted cricketers, and took into account performances in all of the WNCL, WBBL, and international games between 10 December 2016 and 28 November 2017.

In November 2018, Redmayne was named in the Hobart Hurricanes' squad for the 2018–19 Women's Big Bash League season.

=== Queensland Fire ===
In May 2019, Redmayne was signed by Queensland Fire for the 2019–20 WNCL season. She was expected to take on a batter-only role, as the Fire already had keepers Beth Mooney and Josie Dooley in its squad.

=== Welsh Fire ===
In 2021, she was drafted by Welsh Fire for the inaugural season of The Hundred. She was the second leading run scorer for Welsh Fire with 187 runs.

== International career ==
In August 2021, Redmayne was named in Australia's squad for their series against India, which included a one-off day/night Test match as part of the tour. In January 2022, Redmayne was named in Australia's A squad for their series against England A, with the matches being played alongside the Women's Ashes. Later the same month, she was named as a reserve in Australia's team for the 2022 Women's Cricket World Cup in New Zealand.

== Personal life ==
Redmayne holds a Bachelor of Medical Studies and Doctor of Medicine awarded by the University of New South Wales, She graduated in 2018, and hopes to pursue a career in sports medicine. As of 2019, she was combining her cricket career with working as a doctor at Tweed Hospital on the New South Wales-Queensland border.

In 2013, Redmayne won the Bradman Foundation's Bradman Scholarship, and in 2016, UNSW awarded her a Ben Lexcen Sports Scholarship. Redmayne has "always been interested in anatomy, body systems and recovery from injury and disease", and "as a rural student [she was] passionate about addressing health inequities in rural and remote Australia".
