= Steven Farrell =

Australian cricketer (born 1980)

Personal information
- Born: 6 February 1980 (age 46); Townsville, Queensland, Australia
- Source: Cricinfo, 25 January 2016

Steven Farrell (born 6 February 1980) is an Australian former cricketer. He played two first-class matches for Queensland in 2003. He is now an umpire and stood in a tour match between Ireland and Queensland XI in Brisbane in January 2016.
