= Ashley Noffke =

Australian cricketer

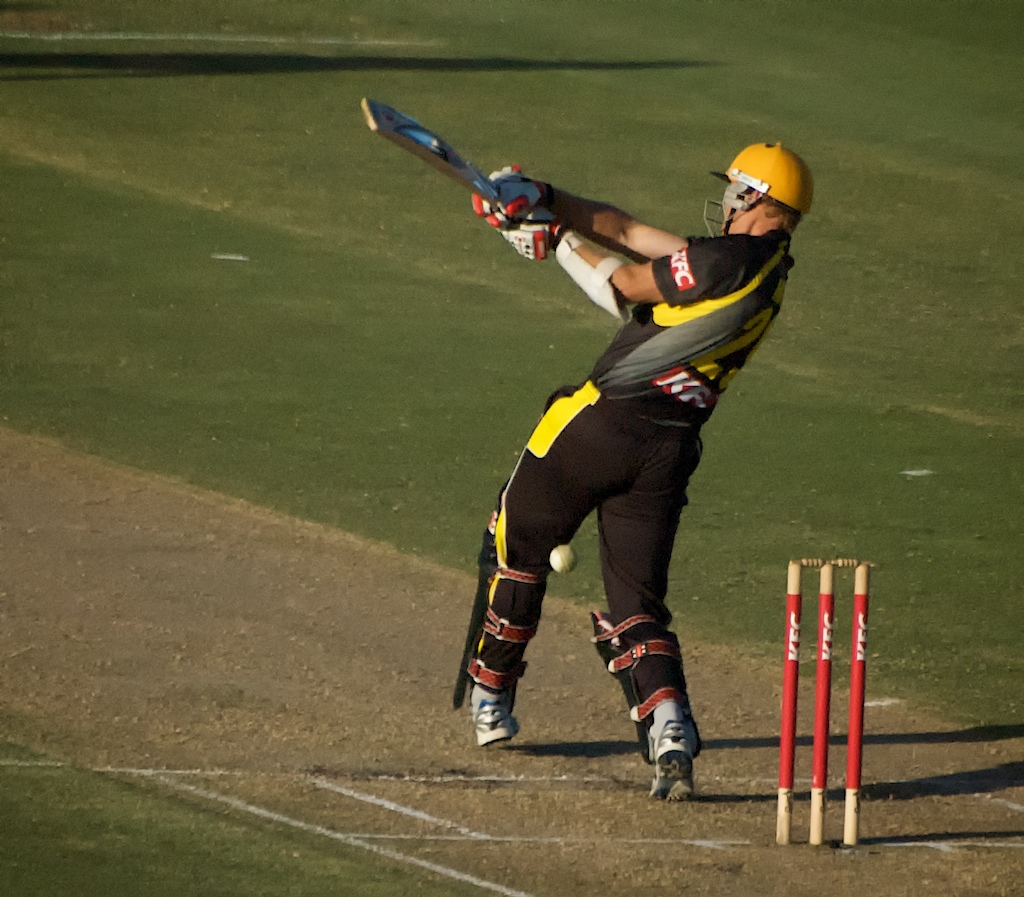

Personal information
- Full name: Ashley Allan Noffke
- Born: 30 April 1977 (age 49); Nambour, Queensland, Australia
- Nickname: Noffers, Wombat
- Height: 190 cm (6 ft 3 in)
- Batting: Right-handed
- Bowling: Right-arm fast-medium
- Role: All-rounder
- Relatives: Nonnie Noffke

International information
- National side: Australia
- Only ODI (cap 164): 3 February 2008 v India
- T20I debut (cap 25): 11 December 2007 v South Africa
- Last T20I: 1 February 2008 v India

Domestic team information
- Years: Team
- 1999/00–2008/09: Queensland
- 2002–2003: Middlesex
- 2005: Durham
- 2007: Gloucestershire
- 2008: Royal Challengers Bangalore
- 2009: Worcestershire
- 2009/10–2010/11: Western Australia

Career statistics
Competition	ODI	T20I	FC	LA
Matches	1	2	118	121
Runs scored	0	0	3,766	808
Batting average	–	0.00	26.90	16.48
100s/50s	0/0	0/0	2/18	0/1
Top score	0	0	114*	58
Balls bowled	54	45	22,510	5,914
Wickets	1	4	386	138
Bowling average	46.00	10.25	29.41	32.45
5 wickets in innings	0	0	18	0
10 wickets in match	0	0	1	0
Best bowling	1/46	3/18	8/24	4/32
Catches/stumpings	0/–	0/–	44/–	28/–
- Source: CricketArchive, 4 June 2021

Ashley Allan Noffke (born 30 April 1977) is a former Australian professional cricketer who played domestically for Queensland (1998–2009) and Western Australia (2009–2010). Noffke, who primarily played as a right-arm fast-medium bowler, also made three appearances for the Australian national side.

== Playing career ==
Noffke made his first-class debut on 27 March 1999 for the Australian Cricket Academy XI against the Zimbabwe Cricket Academy XI in Harare. In a match in which the Australians dominated, Noffke claimed 1/5 off 2 overs in the first innings and 2/10 off 6 overs in the second. On 27 January 2000, Noffke made his maiden first-class appearance for Queensland against Victoria. In a convincing victory for Queensland, Noffke impressed with the ball, taking 4/46 in the first innings and 2/59 in the second.

In 2001, Noffke was rewarded with a place in Australia's squad for the 2001 Ashes series after a man of the match performance in Queensland's victory in the final of the 2000–01 Pura Cup. Noffke played 3 matches on the tour, performing well in the first 2 against Somerset and Hampshire. The third match, against Sussex however, did not go as well for Noffke. He was injured attempting a "soccer-style" run out and had to fly back home again. Noffke was also later selected for Australia's tour of the West Indies in 2003, however he failed to take any wickets in 2 tour games, and did not make the Test or One Day teams.

Noffke had a strong 2006–07 season for Queensland, taking 30 wickets at 24.30 in the Pura Cup, and 15 wickets at 24.60 in the Ford Ranger Cup. His good form earned him the Queensland Player of the Year prize and a place in Australia's preliminary squad for the 2007 Twenty20 World Championship. He was also named to play in Australia A's tour of Pakistan in September 2007

Noffke has been in career best form in the 2007–08 Domestic season leading to Queensland captain Jimmy Maher calling for his selection in the Australian team. After playing 6 matches in the 2007–08 Pura Cup season, Noffke has scored 549 runs at an average of 54.90 with 1 century and 5 fifties, and has taken 31 wickets at an average of 20.22.

Noffke's start to the season was rewarded as on 5 December 2007 he was named in Australia's squad for their Twenty20 International match against New Zealand at Perth on 11 December 2007. In a very comfortable victory for Australia, Noffke took 3/18 off 3.3 overs, the best figures of the match. He did not get an opportunity with the bat, however, as he was run out for a diamond duck whilst attempting a second run with batting partner Andrew Symonds. Noffke won the 2008 State Cricket Players of the Year award.

In October 2010, Noffke announced his retirement from first-class cricket.

== Coaching career ==
Since retiring, Noffke has coached across men's and women's programs, with great success. Noffke began his coaching career as the Assistant bowling coach of Western Australia under Mickey Arthur, before returning to Queensland Cricket as a bowling coach for the Queensland Bulls and the Brisbane Heat before being appointed the Senior Assistant coach. During his time in these roles the Bulls and Brisbane Heat won trophies across all formats.

Noffke worked as the Head of Female Pathways at Queensland Cricket and Head Coach of both the Brisbane Heat and Queensland Fire women's teams. As a coach he has experienced significant success, winning trophies in both forms.

In December 2022, Noffke was appointed as Head Coach of the London Spirit women's team in The Hundred in the UK - where he and England Captain, Heather Knight, led them to their maiden win of the competition in August 2024.

In February 2023, Noffke was appointed as assistant coach and bowling lead of the UP Warriorz in the Women's Premier League in India. In June 2024 he was appointed the head-coach of Otago men's side, one of the six major associations in New Zealand. He left the role after a single season, choosing to take up an assistant role with the Pakistan national cricket team.

== Other information ==
- Noffke's highest first-class score of 114* came against South Australia on 21 December 2003 at the Brisbane Cricket Ground. Noffke also took 6 wickets in the match and was awarded man of the match.
- Noffke's best first-class bowling figures of 8/24 off 15 overs came against Derbyshire whilst playing for Middlesex on 12 and 13 September 2002. He went on to take 12 wickets for the match.
- Noffke played for the Sunshine Coast Scorchers in Brisbane Grade Cricket.
- Noffke became Sefton Park CC's first overseas professional in 1996 and returned in 2000. In two seasons, he scored 1460 runs at an average of 42.94 and took 103 wickets at 14.91 in 49 Liverpool and District Cricket Competition league and cup games.
