= Delissa Kimmince =

Australian rules footballer and cricketer

Personal information
- Full name: Delissa Maree Kimmince
- Born: 14 May 1989 (age 37); Warwick, Queensland, Australia
- Batting: Right-handed
- Bowling: Right-arm fast-medium
- Role: All-rounder

International information
- National side: Australia (2008–2020)
- ODI debut (cap 111): 15 March 2008 v New Zealand
- Last ODI: 9 October 2019 v Sri Lanka
- T20I debut (cap 22): 28 October 2008 v India
- Last T20I: 30 September 2020 v New Zealand

Domestic team information
- Years: Team
- 2006/07–2009/10: Queensland
- 2011: Warwickshire
- 2012/13–2020/21: Queensland
- 2015/16–2020/21: Brisbane Heat
- 2018: Yorkshire Diamonds

Career statistics
Competition	WODI	WT20I	WLA	WT20
Matches	16	44	110	193
Runs scored	79	162	1,662	1,941
Batting average	79.00	16.20	29.15	19.21
100s/50s	0/0	0/0	1/7	0/7
Top score	42	43	100	87*
Balls bowled	640	846	4,232	3,383
Wickets	14	45	101	161
Bowling average	29.42	21.08	28.40	24.09
5 wickets in innings	1	0	3	0
10 wickets in match	0	0	0	0
Best bowling	5/26	3/20	5/12	4/18
Catches/stumpings	8/–	10/–	39/–	56/–
Source: CricketArchive, 2 November 2022
Australian rules football career
Personal information
- Original team: Yeronga South Brisbane (QWAFL)
- Draft: Rookie player, 2016: Brisbane
- Position: Defender
Playing career^{1}
Years	Club	Games (Goals)
2017	Brisbane	1 (0)
- ^{1} Playing statistics correct to the end of 2017.

Delissa Maree Kimmince (born 14 May 1989) is an Australian former cricketer and Australian rules footballer who played for the national cricket team as an all-rounder. She is a right-handed batter and right-arm fast-medium bowler who played for Queensland Fire in the Women's National Cricket League (WNCL) and the Brisbane Heat in the Women's Big Bash League (WBBL). In April 2021, Kimmince announced her retirement from top-level cricket.

== Early life ==
Kimmince was born and raised in Warwick, Queensland attending Warwick State High School.

== Cricket ==
Kimmince made her debut for Queensland aged 17 and her debut for Australia aged 18 against New Zealand in March 2008. The following year, she played in the Women's Cricket World Cup, but she then took a long break from cricket, during which time Kimmince moved to London and worked in the Princess Louise pub in Holborn. During this time, Kimmince was talked into playing for Warwickshire and took a three-hour train journey each way to matches each week without attending training.

Kimmince returned to state cricket for the 2012–13 season, and in 2014 returned to playing for Australia, playing in the ICC World T20 tournament in Bangladesh, and in a series against Pakistan at home.

In June 2015, Kimmince was named as one of Australia's touring party for the 2015 Women's Ashes in England, as a Twenty20 specialist. However, she was later ruled out due to a lower back issue.

In October 2015, Kimmince assumed the captaincy of Queensland Fire, replacing Jodie Fields, who was recovering from shoulder surgery. Soon afterwards, Kimmince became the inaugural captain of Brisbane Heat, but in January 2017, she stepped down from that role and was replaced by Kirby Short.

In April 2018, she was one of the fourteen players to be awarded a national contract for the 2018–19 season by Cricket Australia. In October 2018, she was named in Australia's squad for the 2018 ICC Women's World Twenty20 tournament in the West Indies.

In November 2018, she was named in Brisbane Heat's squad for the 2018–19 Women's Big Bash League season. In April 2019, Cricket Australia awarded her with a contract ahead of the 2019–20 season.

In June 2019, Cricket Australia named her in Australia's team for their tour to England to contest the Women's Ashes. On 4 July 2019, in the second Women's One Day International (WODI) match of the Women's Ashes, Kimmince took her first five-wicket haul in WODIs. In January 2020, she was named in Australia's squad for the 2020 ICC Women's T20 World Cup in Australia.

== Australian rules football ==
On 26 September 2016, Kimmince was announced as the Brisbane Lions' second rookie signing for the inaugural AFL Women's (AFLW) season in 2017. She made her AFLW debut for Brisbane in their Round 6, 2017 clash with the Western Bulldogs. At the end of the 2017 season, she was delisted by the Lions.

=== Statistics ===
Legend
G	Goals	K	Kicks	D	Disposals	T	Tackles
B	Behinds	H	Handballs	M	Marks

Season	Team	No.	Games	Totals							Averages (per game)							Votes
Season	Team	No.	Games	G	B	K	H	D	M	T	G	B	K	H	D	M	T	Votes
2017	Brisbane	26	1	0	0	7	0	7	3	1	0.0	0.0	7.0	0.0	7.0	3.0	1.0	0
Career			1	0	0	7	0	7	3	1	0.0	0.0	7.0	0.0	7.0	3.0	1.0	0

== Personal life ==
Kimmince became engaged to her Brisbane Heat teammate Laura Harris in November 2019, after dating Harris for four years. They married in Marburg, Queensland in August 2020.
