= Grace Harris =

Australian cricketer (born 1993)

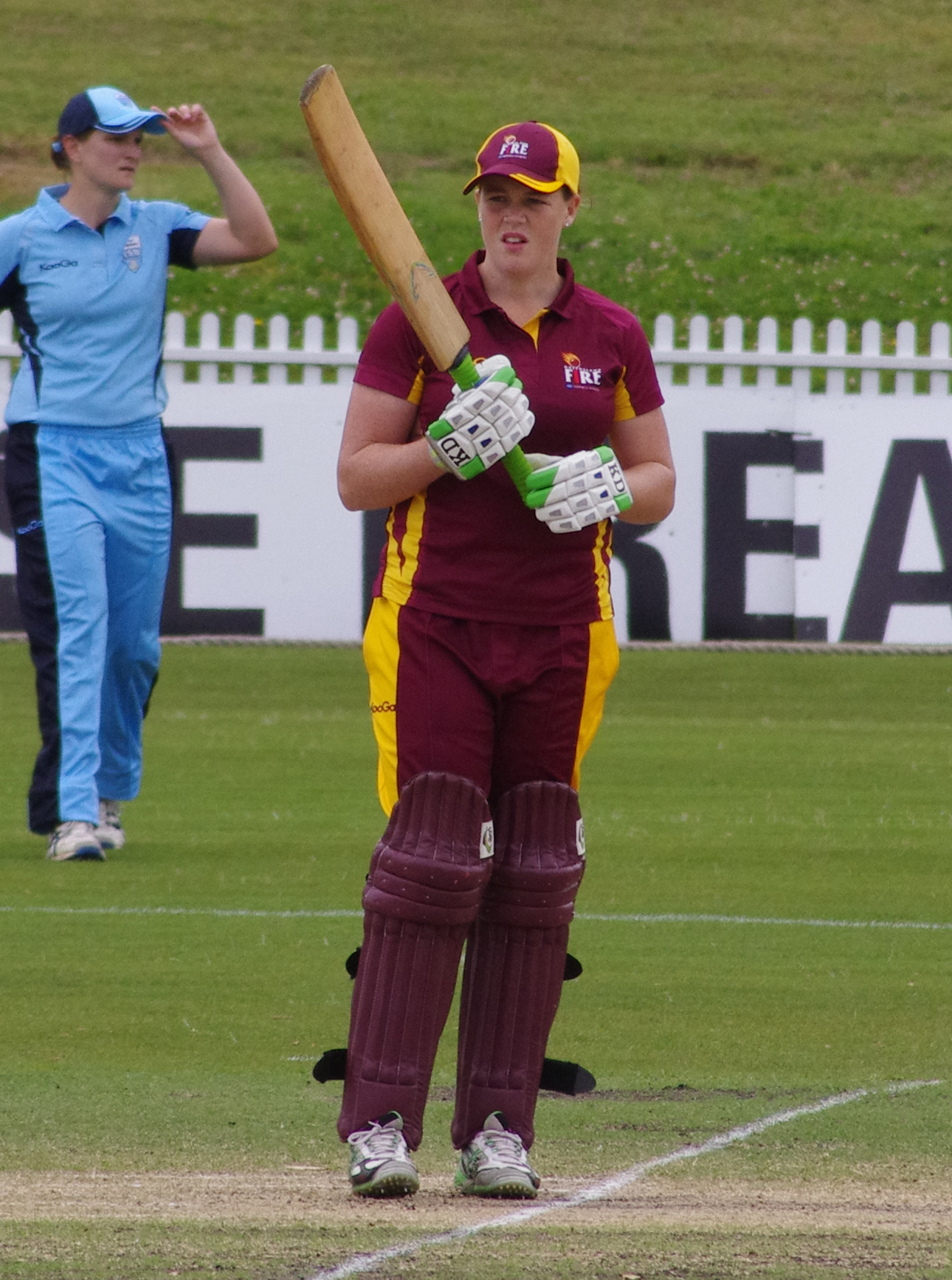
- Harris in 2011

Personal information
- Full name: Grace Margaret Harris
- Born: 18 September 1993 (age 33); Ipswich, Queensland, Australia
- Batting: Right-handed
- Bowling: Right-arm off break
- Role: All-rounder
- Relatives: Laura Harris (sister)

International information
- National side: Australia (2015–present)
- ODI debut (cap 129): 2 February 2016 v India
- Last ODI: 20 September 2025 v India
- T20I debut (cap 40): 19 August 2015 v Ireland
- Last T20I: 26 March 2025 v New Zealand
- T20I shirt no.: 48

Domestic team information
- Years: Team
- 2010/11–present: Queensland
- 2015/16, 2017/18–present: Brisbane Heat
- 2016/17: Melbourne Renegades
- 2023–2025: UP Warriorz
- 2023–present: London Spirit
- 2026: Royal Challengers Bengaluru (WPL)
- 2027– present: UP Warriorz

Career statistics
Competition	WODI	WT20I	WLA	WT20
Matches	11	51	91	256
Runs scored	15	577	1,848	4,588
Batting average	3.00	22.19	27.87	22.49
100s/50s	0/0	0/1	3/10	3/20
Top score	7*	64*	162	136*
Balls bowled	390	186	3,094	2,193
Wickets	11	9	86	104
Bowling average	20.36	19.77	25.75	23.85
5 wickets in innings	0	0	1	0
10 wickets in match	0	0	0	0
Best bowling	3/31	2/7	5/18	4/15
Catches/stumpings	7/-	16/–	40/–	101/–
Medal record
Representing Australia
Women's Cricket
Commonwealth Games
Gold medal – first place	2022 Birmingham	Team
T20 World Cup
Winner	2026 England & Wales
- Source: CricketArchive, 31 January 2025

Grace Margaret Harris (born 18 September 1993) is an Australian cricketer who made her international debut for the Australia women's cricket team in August 2015. An all-rounder, she is a right-handed batter and right-arm off break bowler. She plays for Queensland Fire in the Women's National Cricket League (WNCL) and Brisbane Heat in the Women's Big Bash League (WBBL). Harris's older sister is fellow Brisbane Heat cricketer Laura Harris.

== Career ==
In June 2015, she was named as replacement for Delissa Kimmince in the T20I squad who was unable to recover from a lower back issue and made her T20I debut against the Ireland Women as the part of Australian women's cricket team in England and Ireland in 2015. In December 2015, she made 103 runs from 55 balls, and also took four wickets, for Brisbane Heat against Sydney Sixers, thus drawing much early attention to the first season of the WBBL.

In January 2016, she was named in national squad for WODI and T20I against India Women. Later this month she made her WODI debut against the India Women as the part of Indian women's cricket team in Australia in 2015–16.

In November 2018, she was named in Brisbane Heat's squad for the 2018–19 Women's Big Bash League season. On 19 December 2018, she scored the fastest innings of 100 runs in the WBBL, off 42 balls.

In December 2020, Harris scored two centuries in two days for Western Suburbs in the Queensland Premier Cricket league.

In January 2022, Harris was named in Australia's A squad for their series against England A, with the matches being played alongside the Women's Ashes. Later the same month, she was named in Australia's team for the 2022 Women's Cricket World Cup in New Zealand. In May 2022, Harris was named in Australia's team for the cricket tournament at the 2022 Commonwealth Games in Birmingham, England.

In the inaugural season of the Indian Women's Premier League in 2023, Grace Harris was bought by UP Warriorz. In March 2023, she was named in Australia's Test squad for their Ashes series in England.

She was named in the Australia squad for the 2024 ICC Women's T20 World Cup and for the T20I part of the multi-format 2025 Women's Ashes series.
