= Charli Knott =

Australian cricketer (born 2002)

Personal information
- Full name: Charli Rae Knott
- Born: 29 November 2002 (age 23); Hervey Bay, Queensland, Australia
- Batting: Right-handed
- Bowling: Right-arm off break
- Role: All-rounder

Domestic team information
- Years: Team
- 2018/19–present: Queensland
- 2018/19–present: Brisbane Heat
- 2022/23: Wellington
- 2024: Southern Vipers
- 2026–present: UP Warriorz

Career statistics
Competition	WLA	WT20	WFC
Matches	86	117	2
Runs scored	2,190	1760	178
Batting average	30.00	20.70	44.50
100s/50s	2/13	0/5	1/1
Top score	110	74*	123
Balls bowled	3115	1527	379
Wickets	89	69	6
Bowling average	26.89	27.20	26.33
5 wickets in innings	0	0	0
10 wickets in match	0	0	0
Best bowling	4/14	4/23	3/34
Catches/stumpings	31/–	36/–	3/–
- Source: , 14 October 2025

Charli Rae Knott (born 29 November 2002) is an Australian cricketer who plays as a right-handed batter and occasional right-arm off break bowler for Queensland Fire in the Women's National Cricket League (WNCL) and Brisbane Heat in the Women's Big Bash League (WBBL). She played in eight matches for the Heat in the 2020–21 WBBL season. In January 2023, she signed for Wellington Blaze for the remainder of the 2022–23 Super Smash. In February 2024, it was announced the she had signed for Southern Vipers for the majority of the 2024 season. In February 2026, Knott agreed a short-term contract with The Blaze to play for the club during the opening part of that year's English season.
