= Courtney Sippel =

Australian cricketer (born 2001)

Personal information
- Full name: Courtney Grace Sippel
- Born: 27 April 2001 (age 25); Kingaroy, Queensland, Australia
- Batting: Left-handed
- Bowling: Right-arm medium
- Role: Bowler

Domestic team information
- Years: Team
- 2019/20–2023/24: Brisbane Heat
- 2020/21–2024/25: Queensland
- 2024/25–present: Sydney Sixers
- 2025/26–present: Tasmanian Tigers

Career statistics
Competition	WLA	WT20
Matches	49	61
Runs scored	296	65
Batting average	26.90	10.83
100s/50s	0/2	0/0
Top score	54*	17
Balls bowled	1,975	1,106
Wickets	68	51
Bowling average	25.00	27.66
5 wickets in innings	0	0
10 wickets in match	0	0
Best bowling	4/15	4/27
Catches/stumpings	17/–	20/–
- Source: CricketArchive, 10 October 2025

Courtney Grace Sippel (born 27 April 2001) is an Australian cricketer who plays as a right-arm medium bowler and left-handed batter for Tasmanian Tigers in the Women's National Cricket League (WNCL) and Sydney Sixers in the Women's Big Bash League (WBBL). She played in seven matches for Brisbane Heat in the 2020–21 Women's Big Bash League season. She made her Queensland debut on 30 January 2021 against the ACT Meteors.

In January 2022, Sippel was named in Australia's A squad for their series against England A, with the matches being played alongside the Women's Ashes.

Sippel joined Tasmanian Tigers for the 2025/26 Women's National Cricket League season.
