= Laura Harris (cricketer) =

Australian cricketer

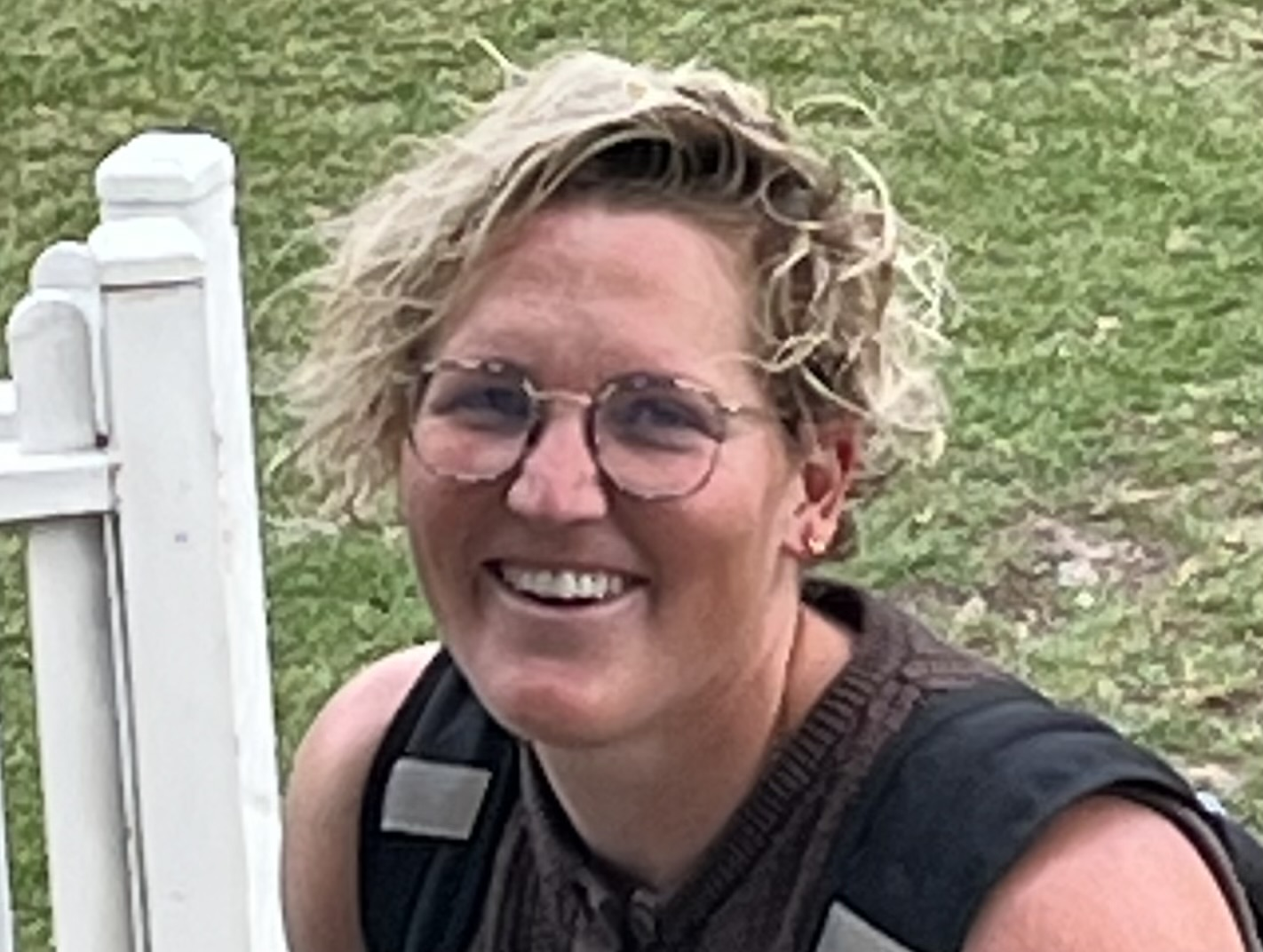
- Harris in October 2025

Personal information
- Full name: Laura May Harris
- Born: 18 August 1990 (age 36); Ipswich, Queensland, Australia
- Batting: Right-handed
- Role: Batter
- Relatives: Grace Harris (sister) Delissa Kimmince (wife)

Domestic team information
- Years: Team
- 2015/16–2024: Brisbane Heat
- 2016/17–present: Queensland
- 2021: Northern Superchargers
- 2022/23: Wellington
- 2023: Delhi Capitals
- 2023: Welsh Fire
- 2023–2024: Barbados Royals
- 2024: Oval Invincibles
- 2025: Warwickshire
- 2025: Sydney Thunder

Career statistics
Competition	WLA	WT20
Matches	66	176
Runs scored	1,216	2,081
Batting average	24.32	17.63
100s/50s	1/7	1/4
Top score	101	102*
Catches/stumpings	36/–	52/–
- Source: CricketArchive, 6 August 2025

Laura May Harris (born 18 August 1990) is an Australian cricketer who plays as a right-handed batter for Queensland Fire in the Women's National Cricket League (WNCL) and Sydney Thunder in the Women's Big Bash League (WBBL).

== Career ==
She made her Queensland debut in the 2016–17 WNCL. She has played for Brisbane Heat since the inception of the WBBL in 2015 and hit the winning runs in their title wins in both 2018–19 and 2019–20. In 2021, she was drafted by Northern Superchargers for the inaugural season of The Hundred. She played for them in six games and scored 61 runs in total. In January 2023, she signed for Wellington Blaze for the remainder of the 2022–23 Super Smash.

== Personal life ==
Harris's younger sister is fellow Brisbane Heat cricketer Grace Harris. In November 2019, she proposed to her Brisbane Heat teammate Delissa Kimmince, after dating for four years. They married in Marburg, Queensland in August 2020. Harris has worked as a nurse when not playing cricket.
