= 2017–18 Hobart Hurricanes WBBL season =

Hobart Hurricanes
2017–18 season
- Coach: Julia Price
- Captain(s): Corinne Hall
- Home ground: Blundstone Arena
- League: WBBL
- Record: 2–12 (8th)
- Finals: DNQ
- Leading Run Scorer: Matthews, Redmayne – 297
- Leading Wicket Taker: Nicola Hancock – 11
- Player of the Season: Hayley Matthews

The 2017–18 Hobart Hurricanes Women's season was the third in the team's history. Coached by Julia Price and captained by Corinne Hall, the Hurricanes finished WBBL|03 in last place.

== Squad ==
Each WBBL|03 squad featured 15 active players, with an allowance of up to five marquee signings including a maximum of three from overseas. Australian marquees were defined as players who made at least ten limited-overs appearances for the national team in the three years prior to the cut-off date (24 April 2017).

Personnel changes made ahead of the season included:

- England marquee Heather Knight did not re-sign with the Hurricanes, opting to sit out of the season while recovering from injury. Corinne Hall was subsequently appointed captain, replacing the outgoing Knight (15–14 win–loss record).
- New Zealand marquee Amy Satterthwaite departed the Hurricanes, signing with the Melbourne Renegades.
- England marquee Lauren Winfield signed with the Hurricanes, having played for the Brisbane Heat in WBBL|02 as a replacement player.
- Indian marquee Veda Krishnamurthy signed with the Hurricanes, marking her first appearance in the league.
- Julie Hunter departed the Hurricanes, retiring from cricket after WBBL|02.
- Erin Burns departed the Hurricanes, signing with the Sydney Sixers.
- Stefanie Daffara signed with the Hurricanes, departing the Sydney Thunder.
- Nicola Hancock signed with the Hurricanes, having previously played for the Melbourne Renegades.

Changes made during the season included:

- Irish marquee Isobel Joyce signed as a replacement player for the second-consecutive season. Joyce also stood in as acting captain for five games.

The table below lists the Hurricanes players and their key stats (including runs scored, batting strike rate, wickets taken, economy rate, catches and stumpings) for the season.

No.	Name	Nat.	Birth date	Batting style	Bowling style	G	R	SR	W	E	C	S	Notes
Batters
7	Stefanie Daffara	(Australia)	13 June 1995	Right-handed	Right-arm medium	12	181	89.16	–	–	0	–	
3	Erin Fazackerley	(Australia)	3 July 1998	Right-handed	Right-arm medium	5	30	120.00	1	8.40	3	–	
27	Corinne Hall	(Australia)	12 October 1987	Right-handed	Right-arm off spin	12	60	75.94	–	–	5	–	Captain
33	Isobel Joyce	(Republic of Ireland)	25 July 1983	Right-handed	Left-arm medium	6	99	96.11	1	6.72	1	–	Overseas marquee (replacement)
79	Veda Krishnamurthy	(India)	16 October 1992	Right-handed	Right-arm leg spin	9	144	101.40	1	10.20	2	–	Overseas marquee
99	Sasha Moloney	(Australia)	14 July 1992	Right-handed	Right-arm off spin	8	47	117.50	–	–	3	–	
74	Emma Thompson	(Australia)	2 December 1990	Right-handed	Right-arm medium	4	22	61.11	2	7.57	0	–	
58	Lauren Winfield	(England)	16 August 1990	Right-handed	–	8	72	80.00	–	–	3	–	Overseas marquee
All-rounders
50	Hayley Matthews	(Barbados)	19 March 1998	Right-handed	Right-arm off spin	14	297	94.28	6	6.91	5	–	Overseas marquee
4	Veronica Pyke	(Australia)	4 November 1981	Right-handed	Left-arm medium	14	139	94.55	6	7.22	1	–	
2	Celeste Raack	(Australia)	18 May 1994	Right-handed	Right-arm leg spin	11	17	94.44	2	7.53	2	–	
Wicket-keepers
	Sarah Bryce	(Scotland)	8 January 2000	Right-handed	–	–	–	–	–	–	–	–	Associate Rookie
8	Georgia Redmayne	(Australia)	8 December 1993	Left-handed	–	14	297	86.58	–	–	2	1	
Bowlers
9	Katelyn Fryett	(Australia)	28 May 1992	Right-handed	Right-arm fast medium	9	25	89.28	3	8.55	2	–	
44	Nicola Hancock	(Australia)	8 November 1995	Right-handed	Right-arm fast medium	14	33	67.34	11	6.48	0	–	
12	Brooke Hepburn	(Australia)	4 October 1990	Right-handed	Right-arm medium	12	32	84.21	7	7.96	2	–	
10	Meg Phillips	(Australia)	2 February 1996	Right-handed	Right-arm medium	2	0	0.00	0	9.00	1	–	

== Ladder ==
Pos	Team	Pld	W	L	NR	Pts	NRR
1	Sydney Sixers (C)	14	10	4	0	20	0.890
2	Sydney Thunder	14	10	4	0	20	0.684
3	Perth Scorchers (RU)	14	8	6	0	16	0.266
4	Adelaide Strikers	14	8	6	0	16	0.250
5	Brisbane Heat	14	7	7	0	14	0.147
6	Melbourne Renegades	14	6	8	0	12	0.092
7	Melbourne Stars	14	5	9	0	10	−0.634
8	Hobart Hurricanes	14	2	12	0	4	−1.733

- The top four teams qualified for the play-off phase.

== Fixtures ==
All times are local

Match 2
9 December 2017
14:30
Scorecard

Adelaide Strikers; 3/183 (20 overs)	v	Hobart Hurricanes; 9/138 (20 overs)
Sophie Devine 46 (21); Brooke Hepburn 2/35 (4 overs)		Hayley Matthews 35 (27); Tahlia McGrath 2/15 (3 overs)

Adelaide Strikers won by 45 runs
Gliderol Stadium, Glenelg
Umpires: Steven Farrell and Luke Uthenwoldt
Player of the match: Sophie Devine (Strikers)

- Hobart Hurricanes won the toss and elected to field
- Streamed on cricket.com.au

Match 5
10 December 2017
12:30
Scorecard

Adelaide Strikers; 6/176 (20 overs)	v	Hobart Hurricanes; 93 (18.5 overs)
Suzie Bates 102 (65); Veronica Pyke 4/17 (4 overs)		Veda Krishnamurthy 21 (24); Amanda-Jade Wellington 3/9 (4 overs)

Adelaide Strikers won by 83 runs
Gliderol Stadium, Glenelg
Umpires: Craig Thomas and Luke Uthenwoldt
Player of the match: Suzie Bates (Strikers)

- Adelaide Strikers won the toss and elected to bat
- Streamed on cricket.com.au

Match 12
17 December 2017
14:00
Scorecard

Sydney Sixers; 8/152 (20 overs)	v	Hobart Hurricanes; 8/119 (20 overs)
Ellyse Perry 65 (49); Hayley Matthews 2/29 (4 overs)		Veronica Pyke 35* (26); Dane van Niekerk 4/20 (4 overs)

Sydney Sixers won by 33 runs
Blundstone Arena, Hobart
Umpires: Muhammad Qureshi and Harvey Wolff
Player of the match: Dane van Niekerk (Sixers)

- Sydney Sixers won the toss and elected to bat
- Streamed on cricket.com.au
- Dane van Niekerk became the fourth player to take a hat-trick in the WBBL

Match 15
23 December 2017
12:20
Scorecard

Hobart Hurricanes; 98 (19.4 overs)	v	Sydney Sixers; 1/99 (13.5 overs)
Veda Krishnamurthy 16 (17); Dane van Niekerk 2/18 (4 overs)		Erin Burns 48* (38); Nicola Hancock 1/14 (2 overs)

Sydney Sixers won by 9 wickets (with 37 balls remaining)
Sydney Cricket Ground, Sydney
Umpires: Ryan Nelson and Claire Polosak
Player of the match: Marizanne Kapp (Sixers)

- Hobart Hurricanes won the toss and elected to bat
- Broadcast by Network Ten
- Double header with Match 5 of the Men's BBL

Match 21
30 December 2017
14:20
Scorecard

Hobart Hurricanes; 8/112 (20 overs)	v	Sydney Thunder; 3/116 (16.2 overs)
Hayley Matthews 39 (40); Stafanie Taylor 4/15 (4 overs)		Rachael Haynes 64 (49); Brooke Hepburn 2/14 (3 overs)

Sydney Thunder won by 7 wickets (with 22 balls remaining)
University of Tasmania Stadium, Launceston
Umpires: Muhammad Qureshi and G Beechey
Player of the match: Stafanie Taylor (Thunder)

- Hobart Hurricanes won the toss and elected to bat
- Streamed on cricket.com.au

Match 22
31 December 2017
11:00
Scorecard

Hobart Hurricanes; 97 (19.4 overs)	v	Sydney Thunder; 2/99 (15 overs)
Stefanie Daffara 30 (32); Samantha Bates 3/12 (4 overs)		Alex Blackwell 43* (34); Celeste Raack 1/14 (3 overs)

Sydney Thunder won by 8 wickets (with 30 balls remaining)
University of Tasmania Stadium, Launceston
Umpires: Muhammad Qureshi and Darren Close
Player of the match: Samantha Bates (Thunder)

- Hobart Hurricanes won the toss and elected to bat
- Streamed on cricket.com.au

Match 28
7 January 2018
10:00
Scorecard

Hobart Hurricanes; 4/111 (20 overs)	v	Brisbane Heat; 2/114 (14.4 overs)
Hayley Matthews 34 (40); Jess Jonassen 2/17 (4 overs)		Beth Mooney 62* (43); Veda Krishnamurthy 1/18 (2 overs)

Brisbane Heat won by 8 wickets (with 32 balls remaining)
Blundstone Arena, Hobart
Umpires: Darren Close and Muhammad Qureshi
Player of the match: Beth Mooney (Heat)

- Brisbane Heat won the toss and elected to field
- Streamed on cricket.com.au

Match 30
8 January 2018
10:00
Scorecard

Brisbane Heat; 4/168 (20 overs)	v	Hobart Hurricanes; 126 (18.5 overs)
Kirby Short 79 (55); Emma Thompson 2/26 (4 overs)		Veda Krishnamurthy 33 (20); Haidee Birkett 2/18 (2.5 overs)

Brisbane Heat won by 42 runs
Blundstone Arena, Hobart
Umpires: Darren Close and Wade Stewart
Player of the match: Kirby Short (Heat)

- Hobart Hurricanes won the toss and elected to field
- Streamed on cricket.com.au

Match 37
14 January 2018
10:00
Scorecard

Hobart Hurricanes; 100 (18.5 overs)	v	Melbourne Renegades; 0/102 (17.2 overs)
Hayley Matthews 40 (40); Maitlan Brown 3/28 (3.5 overs)		Sophie Molineux 53* (39)

Melbourne Renegades won by 10 wickets (with 51 balls remaining)
Blundstone Arena, Hobart
Umpires: Wade Stewart and Muhammad Qureshi
Player of the match: Sophie Molineux (Renegades)

- Melbourne Renegades won the toss and elected to field
- Streamed on cricket.com.au

Match 39
15 January 2018
14:50
Scorecard

Hobart Hurricanes; 9/120 (20 overs)	v	Melbourne Renegades; 6/116 (20 overs)
Veda Krishnamurthy 40 (35); Lea Tahuhu 3/25 (4 overs)		Amy Satterthwaite 65 (58); Brooke Hepburn 3/24 (4 overs)

Hobart Hurricanes won by 4 runs
Blundstone Arena, Hobart
Umpires: G Beechey and Darren Close
Player of the match: Brooke Hepburn (Hurricanes)

- Melbourne Renegades won the toss and elected to field
- Streamed on cricket.com.au

Match 44
20 January 2018
13:30
Scorecard

Hobart Hurricanes; 4/122 (20 overs)	v	Perth Scorchers; 1/126 (16 overs)
Isobel Joyce 52* (47); Piepa Cleary 2/11 (3 overs)		Elyse Villani 70* (48); Nicola Hancock 1/25 (4 overs)

Perth Scorchers won by 9 wickets (with 24 balls remaining)
WACA Ground, Perth
Umpires: J Paterson and Trent Steenholdt
Player of the match: Elyse Villani (Scorchers)

- Perth Scorchers won the toss and elected to field
- Streamed on cricket.com.au

Match 45
21 January 2018
14:00
Scorecard

Hobart Hurricanes; 7/130 (20 overs)	v	Perth Scorchers; 4/134 (18.5 overs)
Georgia Redmayne 53 (49); Thamsyn Newton 1/7 (1 over)		Nicole Bolton 60* (61); Katelyn Fryett 2/20 (4 overs)

Perth Scorchers won by 6 wickets (with 7 balls remaining)
Lilac Hill Park, Perth
Umpires: James Hewitt and J Paterson
Player of the match: Nicole Bolton (Scorchers)

- Perth Scorchers won the toss and elected to field
- Streamed on cricket.com.au

Match 49
27 January 2018
12:20
Scorecard

Hobart Hurricanes; 7/107 (20 overs)	v	Melbourne Stars; 3/108 (18 overs)
Hayley Matthews 34 (30); Alana King 2/23 (4 overs)		Katie Mack 42 (44); Nicola Hancock 2/18 (4 overs)

Melbourne Stars won by 7 wickets (with 12 balls remaining)
Melbourne Cricket Ground
Umpires: Daryl Brigham and Darren Close
Player of the match: Katie Mack (Stars)

- Melbourne Stars won the toss and elected to field
- Broadcast by Network Ten

Match 53
28 January 2018
12:00
Scorecard

Hobart Hurricanes; 6/130 (20 overs)	v	Melbourne Stars; 7/128 (20 overs)
Hayley Matthews 44 (44); Erin Osborne 3/23 (4 overs)		Erin Osborne 30 (29); Nicola Hancock 2/22 (4 overs)

Hobart Hurricanes won by 2 runs
Melbourne Cricket Ground
Umpires: Stephen Brne and Dale Ireland
Player of the match: Hayley Matthews (Hurricanes)

- Melbourne Stars won the toss and elected to field
- Streamed on cricket.com.au

== Statistics and awards ==
- Most runs: Hayley Matthews, Georgia Redmayne – 297 each (equal 17th in the league)
- Highest score in an innings: Georgia Redmayne – 53 (49) vs Perth Scorchers, 21 January 2018
- Most wickets: Nicola Hancock – 11 (equal 24th in the league)
- Best bowling figures in an innings: Veronica Pyke – 4/17 (4 overs) vs Adelaide Strikers, 10 December 2017
- Most catches (fielder): Corinne Hall, Hayley Matthews – 5 each (equal 17th in the league)
- Player of the Match awards: Brooke Hepburn, Hayley Matthews – 1 each
- Hurricanes Player of the Tournament: Hayley Matthews
