= 2017–18 Melbourne Stars WBBL season =

Melbourne Stars
2017–18 season
- Melbourne Stars 2017–18 cap logo
- Coach: David Hemp
- Captain(s): Kristen Beams
- Home ground: Melbourne Cricket Ground
- League: WBBL
- Record: 5–9 (7th)
- Finals: DNQ
- Leading Run Scorer: Lizelle Lee – 349
- Leading Wicket Taker: Erin Osborne – 15
- Player of the Season: Erin Osborne

The 2017–18 Melbourne Stars Women's season was the third in the team's history. Coached by David Hemp and captained by Kristen Beams, the Stars finished WBBL|03 in seventh place.

== Squad ==
Each WBBL|03 squad featured 15 active players, with an allowance of up to five marquee signings including a maximum of three from overseas. Australian marquees were defined as players who made at least ten limited-overs appearances for the national team in the three years prior to the cut-off date (24 April 2017).

Personnel changes made ahead of the season included:

- Meg Lanning departed the Stars, signing with the Perth Scorchers. Kristen Beams was appointed captain of the team following Lanning's departure.
- English marquee Nat Sciver departed the Stars, also signing with the Perth Scorchers.
- New Zealand marquee Morna Nielsen and English marquee Danielle Hazell did not re-sign with the Stars.
- Erin Osborne signed with the Stars, departing the Sydney Thunder.
- Jess Duffin, Hayley Jensen and Emma Inglis departed the Stars, all signing with the Melbourne Renegades.
- Annabel Sutherland signed with the Stars, departing the Melbourne Renegades.

Changes made during the season included:

- Erin Osborne stood in as acting captain for two matches.
- New Zealand marquee Katey Martin signed with the Stars as a replacement player.

The table below lists the Stars players and their key stats (including runs scored, batting strike rate, wickets taken, economy rate, catches and stumpings) for the season.

No.	Name	Nat.	Birth date	Batting style	Bowling style	G	R	SR	W	E	C	S	Notes
Batters
15	Makinley Blows	(Australia)	12 December 1997	Right-handed	Right-arm medium	14	19	146.15	4	6.58	1	–	
00	Mignon du Preez	(South Africa)	13 June 1989	Right-handed	–	12	269	112.08	0	6.00	5	–	Overseas marquee
9	Anna Lanning	(Australia)	25 March 1994	Right-handed	Right-arm medium	14	174	83.25	–	–	2	–	
2	Katie Mack	(Australia)	14 September 1993	Right-handed	Right-arm leg spin	14	291	105.43	–	–	3	–	
21	Katey Martin	(Australia)	7 February 1985	Right-handed	–	2	17	80.95	–	–	2	–	Overseas marquee (replacement)
All-rounders
34	Georgia Elwiss	(England)	31 May 1991	Right-handed	Right-arm medium	10	184	93.40	7	7.57	0	–	Overseas marquee
13	Alana King	(Australia)	22 November 1995	Right-handed	Right-arm leg spin	14	112	99.11	13	7.50	2	–	
76	Erin Osborne	(Australia)	27 June 1989	Right-handed	Right arm off spin	14	211	92.54	15	6.33	8	–	Australian marquee
Wicket-keepers
4	Nicole Faltum	(Australia)	17 January 2000	Right-handed	–	9	0	0.00	–	–	0	6	
67	Lizelle Lee	(South Africa)	2 April 1992	Right-handed	Right-arm medium	12	349	111.14	–	–	4	0	Overseas marquee
Bowlers
27	Hayleigh Brennan	(Australia)	5 March 1999	Right-handed	Right-arm medium	1	1	50.00	0	18.00	0	–	
26	Kristen Beams	(Australia)	6 November 1984	Right-handed	Right-arm leg spin	12	2	100.00	4	5.73	4	–	Captain, Australian marquee
22	Emma Kearney	(Australia)	24 September 1989	Right-handed	Right-arm medium	10	20	105.26	4	8.53	0	–	
7	Chloe Rafferty	(Australia)	16 June 1999	Right-handed	Right-arm medium fast	2	–	–	–	–	0	–	
3	Annabel Sutherland	(Australia)	12 October 2001	Right-handed	Right-arm medium fast	7	22	104.76	9	5.48	3	–	
8	Gemma Triscari	(Australia)	24 January 1990	Left-handed	Left-arm fast medium	7	0	0.00	3	10.54	1	–	
	Khadija Tul Kubra	(Bangladesh)	30 January 1995	Right-handed	Right arm off spin	–	–	–	–	–	–	–	Associate Rookie

== Ladder ==
Pos	Team	Pld	W	L	NR	Pts	NRR
1	Sydney Sixers (C)	14	10	4	0	20	0.890
2	Sydney Thunder	14	10	4	0	20	0.684
3	Perth Scorchers (RU)	14	8	6	0	16	0.266
4	Adelaide Strikers	14	8	6	0	16	0.250
5	Brisbane Heat	14	7	7	0	14	0.147
6	Melbourne Renegades	14	6	8	0	12	0.092
7	Melbourne Stars	14	5	9	0	10	−0.634
8	Hobart Hurricanes	14	2	12	0	4	−1.733

- The top four teams qualified for the play-off phase.

== Fixtures ==
All times are local

Match 3
9 December 2017
18:15 (D/N)
Scorecard

Sydney Sixers; 4/242 (20 overs)	v	Melbourne Stars; 7/156 (20 overs)
Ashleigh Gardner 114 (52); Erin Osborne 2/33 (4 overs)		Lizelle Lee 64 (36); Sarah Aley 2/30 (4 overs)

Sydney Sixers won by 86 runs
North Sydney Oval No. 2
Umpires: Marc Nickl and Ben Treloar
Player of the match: Ashleigh Gardner (Sixers)

- Melbourne Stars won the toss and elected to field
- Broadcast by Network Ten

Match 8
12 December 2017
14:00
Scorecard

Melbourne Stars; 8/114 (20 overs)	v	Sydney Thunder; 2/115 (14.3 overs)
Lizelle Lee 31 (25); Harmanpreet Kaur 3/18 (4 overs)		Rachael Haynes 54 (33); Emma Kearney 1/25 (3 overs)

Sydney Thunder won by 8 wickets (with 33 balls remaining)
Lavington Sports Oval, Albury
Umpires: Dinusha Bandara and Andrew Crozier
Player of the match: Rachael Haynes (Thunder)

- Sydney Thunder won the toss and elected to field
- Streamed on cricket.com.au

Match 10
16 December 2017
13:00
Scorecard

Melbourne Stars; 4/132 (20 overs)	v	Sydney Thunder; 1/135 (15.1 overs)
Mignon du Preez 58 (48); Samantha Bates 1/16 (4 overs)		Rachael Haynes 78* (49); Erin Osborne 1/26 (4 overs)

Sydney Thunder won by 9 wickets (with 29 balls remaining)
Howell Oval, Penrith
Umpires: Ryan Nelson and G Stubbings
Player of the match: Rachael Haynes (Thunder)

- Sydney Thunder won the toss and elected to field
- Streamed on cricket.com.au

Match 17
26 December 2017
11:20
Scorecard

Melbourne Stars; 4/163 (20 overs)	v	Perth Scorchers; 1/164 (18.3 overs)
Lizelle Lee 76 (62); Emma King 2/24 (4 overs)		Elyse Villani 84* (53); Erin Osborne 1/24 (4 overs)

Perth Scorchers won by 9 wickets (with 9 balls remaining)
WACA Ground, Perth
Umpires: Ashlee Kovalevs and John Taylor
Player of the match: Nicole Bolton (Scorchers)

- Perth Scorchers won the toss and elected to field
- Streamed on cricket.com.au
- Double header with Match 7 of the Men's BBL

Match 18
27 December 2017
11:30
Scorecard

Melbourne Stars; 6/149 (20 overs)	v	Perth Scorchers; 4/137 (20 overs)
Georgia Elwiss 25 (24); Katherine Brunt 2/13 (3 overs)		Elyse Villani 72 (44); Alana King 1/11 (2 overs)

Melbourne Stars won by 12 runs
WACA Ground, Perth
Umpires: James Hewitt and John Taylor
Player of the match: Elyse Villani (Scorchers)

- Melbourne Stars won the toss and elected to bat
- Streamed on cricket.com.au

Match 26
3 January 2018
14:00
Scorecard

Adelaide Strikers; 5/144 (20 overs)	v	Melbourne Stars; 9/122 (20 overs)
Tammy Beaumont 46 (48); Georgia Elwiss 2/22 (4 overs)		Lizelle Lee 44 (42); Megan Schutt 2/23 (4 overs)

Adelaide Strikers won by 22 runs
Casey Fields No. 4, Melbourne
Umpires: Stephen Brne and Dale Ireland
Player of the match: Alex Price (Strikers)

- Melbourne Stars won the toss and elected to field
- Streamed on cricket.com.au

Match 27
6 January 2018
14:20
Scorecard

Melbourne Renegades; 6/142 (20 overs)	v	Melbourne Stars; 3/145 (19 overs)
Jess Duffin 40 (34); Erin Osborne 2/14 (4 overs)		Georgia Elwiss 59* (51); Lea Tahuhu 1/21 (3 overs)

Melbourne Stars won by 7 wickets (with 6 balls remaining)
Melbourne Cricket Ground
Umpires: Daryl Brigham and Dale Ireland
Player of the match: Georgia Elwiss (Stars)

- Melbourne Renegades won the toss and elected to bat
- Streamed on cricket.com.au

Match 32
6 January 2018
14:20
Scorecard

Melbourne Stars; 5/132 (20 overs)	v	Adelaide Strikers; 9/134 (20 overs)
Lizelle Lee 52 (52); Sophie Devine 2/28 (4 overs)		Tabatha Saville 28* (27); Annabel Sutherland 4/20 (4 overs)

Adelaide Strikers won by 1 wicket (with 0 balls remaining)
Adelaide Oval
Umpires: David Shepard and Craig Thomas
Player of the match: Tabatha Saville (Strikers)

- Melbourne Stars won the toss and elected to bat
- Streamed on cricket.com.au

The Adelaide Strikers recorded the first-ever one-wicket victory in WBBL history, defeating the Melbourne Stars on the last ball of the match. Requiring three runs with one delivery remaining, Tabatha Saville scored a boundary off Stars captain Kristen Beams to clinch a narrow win for the Strikers.

Match 33
12 January 2018
18:30 (D/N)
Scorecard

Melbourne Stars; 3/133 (20 overs)	v	Brisbane Heat; 5/134 (18.1 overs)
Katie Mack 57 (48); Deandra Dottin 2/13 (3 overs)		Beth Mooney 57 (38); Alana King 2/22 (4 overs)

Brisbane Heat won by 5 wickets (with 11 balls remaining)
Harrup Park, Mackay
Umpires: Stephen Dionysius and David Taylor
Player of the match: Beth Mooney (Heat)

- Melbourne Stars won the toss and elected to bat
- Streamed on cricket.com.au

Match 36
13 January 2018
18:30 (D/N)
Scorecard

Brisbane Heat; 8/93 (20 overs)	v	Melbourne Stars; 4/94 (17.2 overs)
Jess Jonassen 46 (46); Erin Osborne 4/20 (4 overs)		Mignon du Preez 36* (34); Sammy-Jo Johnson 2/26 (3.2 overs)

Melbourne Stars won by 6 wickets (with 16 balls remaining)
Harrup Park, Mackay
Umpires: Stephen Dionysius and David Taylor
Player of the match: Erin Osborne (Stars)

- Brisbane Heat won the toss and elected to bat
- Streamed on cricket.com.au

Match 42
20 January 2018
13:45
Scorecard

Melbourne Stars; 6/118 (20 overs)	v	Melbourne Renegades; 6/118 (20 overs)
Alana King 22 (17); Molly Strano 1/17 (3 overs)		Amy Satterthwaite 31* (27); Annabel Sutherland 2/11 (4 overs)

Match Tied (Melbourne Stars won the Super Over)
Melbourne Cricket Ground
Umpires: Stephen Brne and David Shepard
Player of the match: Alana King (Stars)

- Melbourne Stars won the toss and elected to bat
- Broadcast by Network Ten

Match 46
21 January 2018
14:00
Scorecard

Melbourne Stars; 7/106 (20 overs)	v	Sydney Sixers; 5/107 (18 overs)
Erin Osborne 39 (43); Marizanne Kapp 2/13 (4 overs)		Ellyse Perry 39* (45); Annabel Sutherland 1/13 (3 overs)

Sydney Sixers won by 5 wickets (with 12 balls remaining)
Casey Fields No. 4, Melbourne
Umpires: Stephen Brne and Dale Ireland
Player of the match: Ellyse Perry (Sixers)

- Melbourne Stars won the toss and elected to bat
- Streamed on cricket.com.au

Match 49
27 January 2018
12:20
Scorecard

Hobart Hurricanes; 7/107 (20 overs)	v	Melbourne Stars; 3/108 (18 overs)
Hayley Matthews 34 (30); Alana King 2/23 (4 overs)		Katie Mack 42 (44); Nicola Hancock 2/18 (4 overs)

Melbourne Stars won by 7 wickets (with 12 balls remaining)
Melbourne Cricket Ground
Umpires: Daryl Brigham and Darren Close
Player of the match: Katie Mack (Stars)

- Melbourne Stars won the toss and elected to field
- Broadcast by Network Ten

Match 53
28 January 2018
12:00
Scorecard

Hobart Hurricanes; 6/130 (20 overs)	v	Melbourne Stars; 7/128 (20 overs)
Hayley Matthews 44 (44); Erin Osborne 3/23 (4 overs)		Erin Osborne 30 (29); Nicola Hancock 2/22 (4 overs)

Hobart Hurricanes won by 2 runs
Melbourne Cricket Ground
Umpires: Stephen Brne and Dale Ireland
Player of the match: Hayley Matthews (Hurricanes)

- Melbourne Stars won the toss and elected to field
- Streamed on cricket.com.au

== Statistics and awards ==
- Most runs: Lizelle Lee – 349 (10th in the league)
- Highest score in an innings: Lizelle Lee – 76 (62) vs Perth Scorchers, 26 December 2017
- Most wickets: Erin Osborne – 15 (equal 10th in the league)
- Best bowling figures in an innings:
  - Annabel Sutherland – 4/20 (4 overs) vs Adelaide Strikers, 9 January 2018
  - Erin Osborne – 4/20 (4 overs) vs Brisbane Heat, 13 January 2018
- Most catches (fielder): Erin Osborne – 8 (equal 8th in the league)
- Player of the Match awards:
  - Georgia Elwiss, Alana King, Katie Mack, Erin Osborne – 1 each
- Stars Player of the Season: Erin Osborne
- WBBL|03 Young Gun Award: Annabel Sutherland (nominated)
