= 2017–18 Sydney Thunder WBBL season =

Sydney Thunder
2017–18 season
- Sydney Thunder 2017–18 cap logo
- Coach: Joanne Broadbent
- Captain(s): Alex Blackwell
- Home ground: North Sydney Oval
- League: WBBL
- Record: 10–4 (2nd)
- Finals: Semi-finalists
- Leading Run Scorer: Rachael Haynes – 426
- Leading Wicket Taker: Carey, Farrell – 17
- Player of the Season: Rachael Haynes

The 2017–18 Sydney Thunder Women's season was the third in the team's history. Coached by Joanne Broadbent and captained by Alex Blackwell, the Thunder finished the regular season of WBBL|03 in second place. They were subsequently knocked out of the tournament via a 27-run semi-final loss to the Perth Scorchers at Optus Stadium.

== Squad ==
Each WBBL|03 squad featured 15 active players, with an allowance of up to five marquee signings including a maximum of three from overseas. Australian marquees were defined as players who made at least ten limited-overs appearances for the national team in the three years prior to the cut-off date (24 April 2017).

Personnel changes for ahead of the season included:

- Erin Osborne departed the Thunder, joining the Melbourne Stars.
- Lauren Cheatle departed the Thunder, joining the Sydney Sixers.
- New Zealand marquee Rachel Priest joined the Thunder, departing the Melbourne Renegades.
- Claire Koski departed the Thunder, joining the Melbourne Renegades.
- Mikayla Hinkley departed the Thunder, joining the Perth Scorchers.
- Stefanie Daffara departed the Thunder, joining the Hobart Hurricanes.

Changes made during the season included the signing of England marquee Fran Wilson as a replacement player.

The table below lists the Sixers players and their key stats (including runs scored, batting strike rate, wickets taken, economy rate, catches and stumpings) for the season.

No.	Name	Nat.	Birth date	Batting style	Bowling style	G	R	SR	W	E	C	S	Notes
Batters
2	Alex Blackwell	(Australia)	31 August 1983	Right-handed	Right-arm medium	15	338	95.48	–	–	4	–	Captain, Australian marquee
15	Rachael Haynes	(Australia)	26 December 1986	Left-handed	Left-arm medium	15	426	120.67	–	–	4	–	
45	Harmanpreet Kaur	(India)	8 March 1989	Right-handed	Right-arm off spin	9	107	95.53	3	7.00	5	–	Overseas marquee
10	Naomi Stalenberg	(Australia)	18 April 1994	Right-handed	Right-arm medium	14	227	112.37	0	14.00	9	–	
35	Fran Wilson	(England)	7 November 1991	Right-handed	Right-arm off spin	6	50	125.00	–	–	1	–	Overseas marquee (replacement)
All-rounders
5	Nicola Carey	(Australia)	10 September 1993	Left-handed	Right-arm medium	15	149	126.27	17	6.70	6	–	
25	Hannah Darlington	(Australia)	25 January 2002	Right-handed	Right-arm medium	–	–	–	–	–	–	–	
	Sterre Kalis	(Netherlands)	30 August 1999	Right-handed	Right-arm medium	–	–	–	–	–	–	–	Associate rookie
24	Stafanie Taylor	(Jamaica)	11 June 1991	Right-handed	Right-arm off spin	15	168	84.00	15	6.21	3	–	Overseas marquee
Wicket-keepers
3	Rachel Priest	(New Zealand)	13 July 1985	Right-handed	–	15	264	118.91	–	–	4	7	Overseas marquee
	Hannah Trethewy	(Australia)			–	–	–	–	–	–	–	–	
Bowlers
34	Samantha Bates	(Australia)	7 August 1992	Right-handed	Left-arm orthodox spin	14	7	140.00	16	5.87	3	–	
88	Rene Farrell	(Australia)	13 January 1987	Right-handed	Right-arm fast medium	15	61	141.86	17	6.03	4	–	Australian marquee
13	Maisy Gibson	(Australia)	14 September 1996	Left-handed	Right-arm leg spin	15	4	50.00	9	6.59	2	–	
54	Lisa Griffith	(Australia)	28 August 1992	Right-handed	Right-arm medium	6	2	33.33	0	10.02	3	–	
8	Rachel Trenaman	(Australia)	18 April 2001	Right-handed	Right-arm leg spin	–	–	–	–	–	–	–	
47	Belinda Vakarewa	(Australia)	22 January 1998	Right-handed	Right-arm fast medium	11	–	–	11	5.68	3	–	

== Ladder ==
Pos	Team	Pld	W	L	NR	Pts	NRR
1	Sydney Sixers (C)	14	10	4	0	20	0.890
2	Sydney Thunder	14	10	4	0	20	0.684
3	Perth Scorchers (RU)	14	8	6	0	16	0.266
4	Adelaide Strikers	14	8	6	0	16	0.250
5	Brisbane Heat	14	7	7	0	14	0.147
6	Melbourne Renegades	14	6	8	0	12	0.092
7	Melbourne Stars	14	5	9	0	10	−0.634
8	Hobart Hurricanes	14	2	12	0	4	−1.733

- The top four teams qualified for the play-off phase.

== Fixtures ==
All times are local time

=== Regular season ===
Match 1
9 December 2017
13:45
Scorecard

Sydney Thunder; 6/200 (20 overs)	v	Melbourne Renegades; 6/189 (20 overs)
Rachael Haynes 55 (41); Maitlan Brown 1/29 (4 overs)		Jess Duffin 81 (47); Stafanie Taylor 2/30 (4 overs)

Sydney Thunder won by 11 runs
North Sydney Oval No. 2
Umpires: Ryan Nelson and David Shepard
Player of the match: Jess Duffin (Renegades)

- Melbourne Renegades won the toss and elected to field
- Broadcast by Network Ten

Match 6
10 December 2017
14:00
Scorecard

Sydney Thunder; 6/142 (20 overs)	v	Sydney Sixers; 4/146 (18.4 overs)
Alex Blackwell 58 (52); Ellyse Perry 2/15 (4 overs)		Alyssa Healy 49 (27); Stafanie Taylor 1/27 (3 overs)

Sydney Sixers won by 6 wickets (with 8 balls remaining)
North Sydney Oval No. 2
Umpires: Marc Nickl and Ben Treloar
Player of the match: Alyssa Healy (Sixers)

- Sydney Thunder won the toss and elected to bat
- Broadcast by Network Ten

Match 8
12 December 2017
14:00
Scorecard

Melbourne Stars; 8/114 (20 overs)	v	Sydney Thunder; 2/115 (14.3 overs)
Lizelle Lee 31 (25); Harmanpreet Kaur 3/18 (4 overs)		Rachael Haynes 54 (33); Emma Kearney 1/25 (3 overs)

Sydney Thunder won by 8 wickets (with 33 balls remaining)
Lavington Sports Oval, Albury
Umpires: Dinusha Bandara and Andrew Crozier
Player of the match: Rachael Haynes (Thunder)

- Sydney Thunder won the toss and elected to field
- Streamed on cricket.com.au

Match 10
16 December 2017
13:00
Scorecard

Melbourne Stars; 4/132 (20 overs)	v	Sydney Thunder; 1/135 (15.1 overs)
Mignon du Preez 58 (48); Samantha Bates 1/16 (4 overs)		Rachael Haynes 78* (49); Erin Osborne 1/26 (4 overs)

Sydney Thunder won by 9 wickets (with 29 balls remaining)
Howell Oval, Penrith
Umpires: Ryan Nelson and G Stubbings
Player of the match: Rachael Haynes (Thunder)

- Sydney Thunder won the toss and elected to field
- Streamed on cricket.com.au

Match 21
30 December 2017
14:20
Scorecard

Hobart Hurricanes; 8/112 (20 overs)	v	Sydney Thunder; 3/116 (16.2 overs)
Hayley Matthews 39 (40); Stafanie Taylor 4/15 (4 overs)		Rachael Haynes 64 (49); Brooke Hepburn 2/14 (3 overs)

Sydney Thunder won by 7 wickets (with 22 balls remaining)
University of Tasmania Stadium, Launceston
Umpires: Muhammad Qureshi and G Beechey
Player of the match: Stafanie Taylor (Thunder)

- Hobart Hurricanes won the toss and elected to bat
- Streamed on cricket.com.au

Match 22
31 December 2017
11:00
Scorecard

Hobart Hurricanes; 97 (19.4 overs)	v	Sydney Thunder; 2/99 (15 overs)
Stefanie Daffara 30 (32); Samantha Bates 3/12 (4 overs)		Alex Blackwell 43* (34); Celeste Raack 1/14 (3 overs)

Sydney Thunder won by 8 wickets (with 30 balls remaining)
University of Tasmania Stadium, Launceston
Umpires: Muhammad Qureshi and Darren Close
Player of the match: Samantha Bates (Thunder)

- Hobart Hurricanes won the toss and elected to bat
- Streamed on cricket.com.au

Match 29
7 January 2018
10:00
Scorecard

Sydney Thunder; 6/145 (20 overs)	v	Perth Scorchers; 6/144 (20 overs)
Rachel Priest 42 (32); Piepa Cleary 3/19 (3 overs)		Nicole Bolton 71 (57); Rene Farrell 2/19 (4 overs)

Sydney Thunder won by 1 run
Lilac Hill, Perth
Umpires: A Kovalevs and Trent Steenholdt
Player of the match: Rene Farrell (Thunder)

- Sydney Thunder won the toss and elected to bat
- Streamed on cricket.com.au

The Scorchers were well poised to chase down their target of 146 until a catch on the boundary by Thunder fielder Lisa Griffith dismissed Nicole Bolton for 71 in the 18th over, leaving the hosts needing 20 runs from the final 14 deliveries. On the last ball of the match, Scorchers batter Mathilda Carmichael was run out by a metre while attempting a game-tying run, therefore securing victory for the Thunder by the narrowest of margins.

Match 31
8 January 2018
13:30
Scorecard

Sydney Thunder; 4/134 (20 overs)	v	Perth Scorchers; 2/136 (18.1 overs)
Alex Blackwell 81* (58); Katherine Brunt 1/13 (4 overs)		Natalie Sciver 61* (50); Maisy Gibson 1/18 (4 overs)

Perth Scorchers won by 8 wickets (with 11 balls remaining)
WACA Ground, Perth
Umpires: James Hewitt and A Kovalevs
Player of the match: Alex Blackwell (Thunder)

- Perth Scorchers won the toss and elected to field
- Streamed on cricket.com.au

Match 35
13 January 2018
14:30
Scorecard

Sydney Sixers; 113 (20 overs)	v	Sydney Thunder; 6/114 (19 overs)
Ellyse Perry 25 (25); Samantha Bates 3/21 (4 overs)		Naomi Stalenberg 48 (41); Sarah Aley 3/11 (4 overs)

Sydney Thunder won by 4 wickets (with 6 balls remaining)
Sydney Cricket Ground
Umpires: Anthony Hobson and G Stubbings
Player of the match: Naomi Stalenberg (Thunder)

- Sydney Sixers won the toss and elected to bat
- Streamed on cricket.com.au

Match 43
20 January 2018
14:00
Scorecard

Sydney Thunder; 4/148 (20 overs)	v	Adelaide Strikers; 111 (19.2 overs)
Rachel Priest 51 (27); Tahlia McGrath 2/16 (4 overs)		Bridget Patterson 30 (20); Samantha Bates 3/21 (4 overs)

Sydney Thunder won by 37 runs
Robertson Oval, Wagga Wagga
Umpires: Andrew Scotford and D Young
Player of the match: Rachel Priest (Thunder)

- Sydney Thunder won the toss and elected to bat
- Streamed on cricket.com.au

Match 47
21 January 2018
14:00
Scorecard

Adelaide Strikers; 5/114 (20 overs)	v	Sydney Thunder; 4/114 (20 overs)
Suzie Bates 40 (43); Rene Farrell 2/21 (4 overs)		Naomi Stalenberg 29 (24); Amanda-Jade Wellington 2/21 (4 overs)

Match Tied (Adelaide Strikers won the Super Over)
Robertson Oval, Wagga Wagga
Umpires: Andrew Scotford and D Young
Player of the match: Sophie Devine (Strikers)

- Adelaide Strikers won the toss and elected to bat
- Streamed on cricket.com.au

Match 48
24 January 2018
14:50
Scorecard

Melbourne Renegades; 68 (15.5 overs)	v	Sydney Thunder; 6/69 (16 overs)
Amy Satterthwaite 17 (19); Nicola Carey 3/10 (3.5 overs)		Rachael Haynes 37 (36); Hayley Jensen 3/11 (3 overs)

Sydney Thunder won by 4 wickets (with 24 balls remaining)
Manuka Oval, Canberra
Umpires: Dinusha Bandara and Andrew Crozier
Player of the match: Nicola Carey (Thunder)

- Sydney Thunder won the toss and elected to field
- Streamed on cricket.com.au

Match 52
27 January 2018
13:30
Scorecard

Sydney Thunder; 5/145 (20 overs)	v	Brisbane Heat; 4/146 (18 overs)
Rachael Haynes 43 (30); Jemma Barsby 2/32 (4 overs)		Grace Harris 57 (45); Samantha Bates 2/23 (3 overs)

Brisbane Heat won by 6 wickets (with 12 balls remaining)
Brisbane Cricket Ground
Umpires: Murray Branch and Stephen Dionysius
Player of the match: Grace Harris (Heat)

- Sydney Thunder won the toss and elected to bat
- Streamed on cricket.com.au

Match 56
28 January 2018
14:00
Scorecard

Sydney Thunder; 8/117 (20 overs)	v	Brisbane Heat; 115 (17.4 overs)
Nicola Carey 26 (26); Jemma Barsby 4/2 (2 overs)		Jess Jonassen 33 (21); Belinda Vakarewa 3/17 (4 overs)

Sydney Thunder won by 2 runs
Allan Border Field, Brisbane
Umpires: Murray Branch and Steven Farrell
Player of the match: Belinda Vakarewa (Thunder)

- Brisbane Heat won the toss and elected to field
- Streamed on cricket.com.au

=== Knockout phase ===
Semi-final 1
1 February 2018
12:10
Scorecard

Perth Scorchers; 2/148 (20 overs)	v	Sydney Thunder; 8/121 (20 overs)
Natalie Sciver 38 (28); Stafanie Taylor 1/23 (4 overs)		Fran Wilson 46 (28); Emma King 3/17 (4 overs)

Perth Scorchers won by 27 runs
Optus Stadium, Perth
Umpires: Geoff Joshua and Tony Wilds
Player of the match: Emma King (Scorchers)

- Sydney Thunder won the toss and elected to field
- Played as a double header with BBL semi-final 1
- Broadcast by Network Ten

== Statistics and awards ==
- Most runs: Rachael Haynes – 426 (6th in the league)
- Highest score in an innings: Alex Blackwell – 81* (58) vs Perth Scorchers, 8 January 2018
- Most wickets: Nicola Carey, Rene Farrell – 17 each (equal 4th in the league)
- Best bowling figures in an innings: Stafanie Taylor – 4/15 (4 overs) vs Hobart Hurricanes, 30 December 2017
- Most catches (fielder): Naomi Stalenberg – 9 (equal 3rd in the league)
- Player of the Match awards:
  - Rachael Haynes – 2
  - Samantha Bates, Alex Blackwell, Nicola Carey, Rene Farrell, Rachel Priest, Naomi Stalenberg, Stafanie Taylor, Belinda Vakarewa – 1 each
- Thunder Most Valuable Player: Rachael Haynes
- WBBL|03 Team of the Tournament: Rene Farrell
- WBBL|03 Young Gun Award: Belinda Vakarewa (nominated)
