= 2017–18 Brisbane Heat WBBL season =

Australian cricket team season

Brisbane Heat
2017–18 season
- Coach: Peter McGiffin
- Captain(s): Kirby Short
- Home ground: Allan Border Field
- League: WBBL
- Record: 7–7 (5th)
- Finals: DNQ
- Leading Run Scorer: Beth Mooney – 465
- Leading Wicket Taker: Jemma Barsby – 13
- Player of the Season: Beth Mooney

The 2017–18 Brisbane Heat Women's season was the third in the team's history. Coached by Peter McGiffin and captained by Kirby Short, the Heat finished the regular season of WBBL|03 in fifth place and failed to qualify for the finals. For the third year in a row, Beth Mooney won the team's Most Valuable Player award.

== Squad ==
Each WBBL|03 squad featured 15 active players, with an allowance of up to five marquee signings including a maximum of three from overseas. Australian marquees were defined as players who made at least ten limited-overs appearances for the national team in the three years prior to the cut-off date (24 April 2017).

Personnel changes made ahead of the season included:

- Peter McGiffin was appointed head coach of the Heat, replacing Andy Richards.
- India marquee Smriti Mandhana did not return to the Heat after sustaining a ruptured anterior cruciate ligament during WBBL|02.
- Grace Harris returned to the Heat, having spent one season at the Melbourne Renegades.
- South Africa marquee Laura Wolvaardt signed as a replacement player for Grace Harris who would be unavailable for most of the season while recovering from injury.

The table below lists the Heat players and their key stats (including runs scored, batting strike rate, wickets taken, economy rate, catches and stumpings) for the season.

No.	Name	Nat.	Birth date	Batting style	Bowling style	G	R	SR	W	E	C	S	Notes
Batters
36	Tess Cooper	(Australia)	27 September 1996	Right-handed	–	–	–	–	–	–	–	–	
17	Grace Harris	(Australia)	18 September 1993	Right-handed	Right-arm off spin	4	111	115.62	3	7.08	2	–	Australian marquee
1	Laura Harris	(Australia)	18 August 1990	Right-handed	–	14	60	100.00	–	–	4	–	
10	Kirby Short	(Australia)	3 November 1986	Right-handed	Right-arm off spin	14	308	99.67	–	–	9	–	Captain
14	Laura Wolvaardt	(South Africa)	26 April 1999	Right-handed	–	6	32	59.25	–	–	2	–	Overseas marquee (replacement)
All-rounders
	Rumana Ahmed	(Bangladesh)	29 May 1991	Right-handed	Right-arm leg spin	–	–	–	–	–	–	–	Associate rookie
5	Deandra Dottin	(Cricket West Indies)	21 June 1991	Right-handed	Right-arm medium fast	14	171	89.06	8	6.48	1	–	Overseas marquee
21	Jess Jonassen	(Australia)	5 November 1992	Left-handed	Left-arm orthodox spin	14	203	120.11	11	6.45	6	–	Australian marquee
11	Delissa Kimmince	(Australia)	14 May 1989	Right-handed	Right-arm medium	14	229	117.43	11	6.04	3	–	
Wicketkeepers
6	Beth Mooney	(Australia)	14 January 1994	Left-handed	–	14	465	143.51	–	–	9	3	Australian marquee
Bowlers
15	Jemma Barsby	(Australia)	4 October 1995	Left-handed	Right-arm off spin	13	30	88.23	13	6.07	2	–	
23	Haidee Birkett	(Australia)	23 June 1996	Right-handed	Right-arm medium	14	33	82.50	10	6.64	4	–	
9	Holly Ferling	(Australia)	22 December 1995	Right-handed	Right-arm medium fast	14	23	100.00	4	7.11	3	–	Australian marquee
22	Courtney Hill	(Australia)	9 January 1987	Right-handed	Right-arm medium fast	1	–	–	–	–	0	–	
58	Sammy-Jo Johnson	(Australia)	5 November 1992	Right-handed	Right-arm medium fast	14	31	68.88	10	6.76	1	–	
16	Georgia Prestwidge	(Australia)	17 December 1997	Right-handed	Right-arm medium fast	4	0	–	–	–	0	–	
26	Kara Sutherland	(Australia)	26 September 1991	Left-handed	Left-arm medium fast	–	–	–	–	–	–	–	

== Ladder ==
Pos	Team	Pld	W	L	NR	Pts	NRR
1	Sydney Sixers (C)	14	10	4	0	20	0.890
2	Sydney Thunder	14	10	4	0	20	0.684
3	Perth Scorchers (RU)	14	8	6	0	16	0.266
4	Adelaide Strikers	14	8	6	0	16	0.250
5	Brisbane Heat	14	7	7	0	14	0.147
6	Melbourne Renegades	14	6	8	0	12	0.092
7	Melbourne Stars	14	5	9	0	10	−0.634
8	Hobart Hurricanes	14	2	12	0	4	−1.733

- The top four teams qualified for the play-off phase.

== Fixtures ==
=== Regular season ===
All times are local time

Match 4
10 December 2017
10:45
Scorecard

Perth Scorchers; 6/188 (20 overs)	v	Brisbane Heat; 9/170 (20 overs)
Natalie Sciver 84 (46); Sammy-Jo Johnson 2/24 (4 overs)		Delissa Kimmince 87* (54); Katherine Brunt 3/23 (4 overs)

Perth Scorchers won by 18 runs
North Sydney Oval No. 2
Umpires: Ryan Nelson and David Shepard
Player of the match: Natalie Sciver (Scorchers)

- Perth Scorchers won the toss and elected to bat
- Broadcast by Network Ten

Match 9
15 December 2017
14:00
Scorecard

Perth Scorchers; 7/112 (20 overs)	v	Brisbane Heat; 4/116 (18.5 overs)
Katherine Brunt 29 (32); Delissa Kimmince 2/17 (4 overs)		Kirby Short 50* (48); Katherine Brunt 2/17 (4 overs)

Brisbane Heat won by 6 wickets (with 7 balls remaining)
Allan Border Field, Brisbane
Umpires: Murray Branch and Steven Farrell
Player of the match: Deandra Dottin (Heat)

- Perth Scorchers won the toss and elected to bat
- Streamed on cricket.com.au

Match 14
22 December 2017
14:00
Scorecard

Melbourne Renegades; 6/133 (20 overs)	v	Brisbane Heat; 125 (19.5 overs)
Sophie Molineux 40 (32); Delissa Kimmince 2/26 (4 overs)		Beth Mooney 39 (28); Molly Strano 3/16 (4 overs)

Melbourne Renegades won by 8 runs
Camberwell Sports Ground, Melbourne
Umpires: Daryl Brigham and Dale Ireland
Player of the match: Amy Satterthwaite (Renegades)

- Brisbane Heat won the toss and elected to field
- Streamed on cricket.com.au

Match 16
23 December 2017
14:30
Scorecard

Brisbane Heat; 66 (16.1 overs)	v	Melbourne Renegades; 0/67 (10.5 overs)
Deandra Dottin 14 (20); Amy Satterthwaite 2/5 (2 overs)		Sophie Molineux 45* (37)

Melbourne Renegades won by 10 wickets (with 55 balls remaining)
Etihad Stadium, Melbourne
Umpires: Daryl Brigham and Dale Ireland
Player of the match: Sophie Molineux (Renegades)

- Brisbane Heat won the toss and elected to bat
- Streamed on cricket.com.au
- Double header with Match 6 of the Men's BBL
- Brisbane Heat's total of 66 equalled the record for lowest all out WBBL team score

Match 19
29 December 2017
14:30
Scorecard

Adelaide Strikers; 6/113 (20 overs)	v	Brisbane Heat; 1/114 (16 overs)
Bridget Patterson 32 (30); Deandra Dottin 2/13 (3 overs)		Beth Mooney 86* (57); Amanda Wellington 1/24 (4 overs)

Brisbane Heat won by 9 wickets (with 24 balls remaining)
Adelaide Oval, Adelaide
Umpires: Steven Farrell and Luke Uthenwoldt
Player of the match: Beth Mooney (Heat)

- Brisbane Heat won the toss and elected to field
- Streamed on cricket.com.au

Match 23
31 December 2017
13:45
Scorecard

Adelaide Strikers; 7/119 (20 overs)	v	Brisbane Heat; 2/122 (16.2 overs)
Bridget Patterson 37 (29); Haidee Birkett 3/15 (3 overs)		Beth Mooney 81* (48); Amanda Wellington 1/17 (3.2 overs)

Brisbane Heat won by 8 wickets (with 22 balls remaining)
Adelaide Oval, Adelaide
Umpires: Nathan Johnstone and Craig Thomas
Player of the match: Beth Mooney (Heat)

- Brisbane Heat won the toss and elected to field
- Broadcast by Network Ten

Match 28
7 January 2018
10:00
Scorecard

Hobart Hurricanes; 4/111 (20 overs)	v	Brisbane Heat; 2/114 (14.4 overs)
Hayley Matthews 34 (40); Jess Jonassen 2/17 (4 overs)		Beth Mooney 62* (43); Veda Krishnamurthy 1/18 (2 overs)

Brisbane Heat won by 8 wickets (with 32 balls remaining)
Blundstone Arena, Hobart
Umpires: Darren Close and Muhammad Qureshi
Player of the match: Beth Mooney (Heat)

- Brisbane Heat won the toss and elected to field
- Streamed on cricket.com.au

Match 30
8 January 2018
10:00
Scorecard

Brisbane Heat; 4/168 (20 overs)	v	Hobart Hurricanes; 126 (18.5 overs)
Kirby Short 79 (55); Emma Thompson 2/26 (4 overs)		Veda Krishnamurthy 33 (20); Haidee Birkett 2/18 (2.5 overs)

Brisbane Heat won by 42 runs
Blundstone Arena, Hobart
Umpires: Darren Close and Wade Stewart
Player of the match: Kirby Short (Heat)

- Hobart Hurricanes won the toss and elected to field
- Streamed on cricket.com.au

Match 33
12 January 2018
18:30 (D/N)
Scorecard

Melbourne Stars; 3/133 (20 overs)	v	Brisbane Heat; 5/134 (18.1 overs)
Katie Mack 57 (48); Deandra Dottin 2/13 (3 overs)		Beth Mooney 57 (38); Alana King 2/22 (4 overs)

Brisbane Heat won by 5 wickets (with 11 balls remaining)
Harrup Park, Mackay
Umpires: Stephen Dionysius and David Taylor
Player of the match: Beth Mooney (Heat)

- Melbourne Stars won the toss and elected to bat
- Streamed on cricket.com.au

Match 36
13 January 2018
18:30 (D/N)
Scorecard

Brisbane Heat; 8/93 (20 overs)	v	Melbourne Stars; 4/94 (17.2 overs)
Jess Jonassen 46 (46); Erin Osborne 4/20 (4 overs)		Mignon du Preez 36* (34); Sammy-Jo Johnson 2/26 (3.2 overs)

Melbourne Stars won by 6 wickets (with 16 balls remaining)
Harrup Park, Mackay
Umpires: Stephen Dionysius and David Taylor
Player of the match: Erin Osborne (Stars)

- Brisbane Heat won the toss and elected to bat
- Streamed on cricket.com.au

Match 40
18 January 2018
14:30
Scorecard

Sydney Sixers; 5/160 (20 overs)	v	Brisbane Heat; 151 (20 overs)
Alyssa Healy 70 (43); Jemma Barsby 2/19 (3 overs)		Beth Mooney 60 (42); Sarah Aley 3/31 (4 overs)

Sydney Sixers won by 9 runs
Sydney Cricket Ground
Umpires: Anthony Hobson and Marc Nickl
Player of the match: Dane van Niekerk (Sixers)

- Sydney Sixers won the toss and elected to bat
- Streamed on cricket.com.au

Match 41
19 January 2018
14:00
Scorecard

Sydney Sixers; 7/144 (20 overs)	v	Brisbane Heat; 4/126 (20 overs)
Erin Burns 54* (39); Delissa Kimmince 3/23 (4 overs)		Jess Jonassen 55* (38); Lauren Smith 1/13 (3 overs)

Sydney Sixers won by 18 runs
Hurstville Oval, Sydney
Umpires: Anthony Hobson and T Penman
Player of the match: Erin Burns (Sixers)

- Sydney Sixers won the toss and elected to bat
- Streamed on cricket.com.au

Match 52
27 January 2018
13:30
Scorecard

Sydney Thunder; 5/145 (20 overs)	v	Brisbane Heat; 4/146 (18 overs)
Rachael Haynes 43 (30); Jemma Barsby 2/32 (4 overs)		Grace Harris 57 (45); Samantha Bates 2/23 (3 overs)

Brisbane Heat won by 6 wickets (with 12 balls remaining)
Brisbane Cricket Ground
Umpires: Murray Branch and Stephen Dionysius
Player of the match: Grace Harris (Heat)

- Sydney Thunder won the toss and elected to bat
- Streamed on cricket.com.au

Match 56
28 January 2018
14:00
Scorecard

Sydney Thunder; 8/117 (20 overs)	v	Brisbane Heat; 115 (17.4 overs)
Nicola Carey 26 (26); Jemma Barsby 4/2 (2 overs)		Jess Jonassen 33 (21); Belinda Vakarewa 3/17 (4 overs)

Sydney Thunder won by 2 runs
Allan Border Field, Brisbane
Umpires: Murray Branch and Steven Farrell
Player of the match: Belinda Vakarewa (Thunder)

- Brisbane Heat won the toss and elected to field
- Streamed on cricket.com.au

== Statistics and awards ==
- Most runs: Beth Mooney – 465 (4th in the league)
- Highest score in an innings: Delissa Kimmince – 87* (54) vs Perth Scorchers, 10 December 2017
- Most wickets: Jemma Barsby – 13 (equal 17th in the league)
- Best bowling figures in an innings: Jemma Barsby – 4/2 (2 overs) vs Sydney Thunder, 28 January 2018
- Most catches (fielder): Kirby Short – 9 (equal 3rd in the league)
- Player of the Match awards:
  - Beth Mooney – 4
  - Deandra Dottin, Grace Harris, Kirby Short – 1 each
- Heat Most Valuable Player: Beth Mooney
- WBBL|03 Player of the Tournament: Beth Mooney (equal 4th)
- WBBL|03 Team of the Tournament: Beth Mooney
