= 2017–18 Women's Big Bash League season =

2017–18 Women's Big Bash League
- Logo of the 2017–18 Women's Big Bash League season
- Dates: 9 December 2017 – 4 February 2018
- Administrator: Cricket Australia
- Cricket format: Twenty20
- Tournament format(s): Double round-robin and knockout finals
- Champions: Sydney Sixers (2nd title)
- Participants: 8
- Matches: 59
- Player of the series: Amy Satterthwaite (MLR)
- Most runs: Ellyse Perry (SYS) – 552
- Most wickets: Katherine Brunt (PRS) – 23; Sarah Aley (SYS) – 23

The 2017–18 Women's Big Bash League season or WBBL|03 was the third season of the Women's Big Bash League (WBBL), the semi-professional women's Twenty20 domestic cricket competition in Australia. The tournament was scheduled from 9 December 2017 to 4 February 2018.

The final, held at Adelaide Oval, pitted the Sydney Sixers against the Perth Scorchers for the second season running. Sydney comfortably won the match by nine wickets to claim back-to-back championships. Punctuating an emphatic comeback from retirement, Sixers medium-pace bowler Sarah Coyte managed figures of 4/17 in the decider and was named Player of the Final.

Melbourne Renegades captain Amy Satterthwaite was named Player of the Tournament, although her team failed to qualify for the finals. Sixers captain Ellyse Perry was the leading run-scorer of the season, while the leading wicket-taker title was shared between the Sixers' Sarah Aley and the Scorchers' Katherine Brunt.

== Teams ==
Each squad featured 15 active players, with an allowance of up to five marquee signings including a maximum of three from overseas. Australian marquees were defined as players who made at least ten limited-overs appearances for the national team in the three years prior to the cut-off date (24 April 2017).

The table below lists each team's marquee players and other key details for the season.

Team	Home ground (Note: Number of games hosted at each venue is indicated in brackets)	Secondary grounds	Coach	Captain	Australian representatives (Note: Only includes players who debuted for Australia before the tournament)	Overseas marquee players (Note: New Zealander Hayley Jensen was classed as a local player for the Renegades in WBBL|03 due to her permanent residence in Australia and a lack of recent international cricket appearances)
Adelaide Strikers	Adelaide Oval (4)	Gliderol Stadium (4); Traeger Park (2)	Andrea McCauley	Suzie Bates	Megan Schutt; Tahlia McGrath (Note: Did not qualify as a marquee player); Amanda-Jade Wellington	Suzie Bates; Tammy Beaumont; Sophie Devine
Brisbane Heat	Allan Border Field (2)	Harrup Park (2); The Gabba (1)	Peter McGiffin	Kirby Short	Holly Ferling; Grace Harris; Jess Jonassen; Beth Mooney; Delissa Kimmince	Deandra Dottin; Laura Wolvaardt (Note: Replacement player)
Hobart Hurricanes	Blundstone Arena (5)	UTAS Stadium (2)	Julia Price	Corinne Hall (Note: Isobel Joyce stood in as acting captain for five games.)	N/A	Veda Krishnamurthy; Hayley Matthews; Lauren Winfield; Isobel Joyce
Melbourne Renegades	Camberwell Sports Ground (4)	Etihad Stadium (1); GMHBA Stadium (1)	Tim Coyle	Amy Satterthwaite	Jess Duffin; Kris Britt; Molly Strano	Chamari Atapattu; Amy Satterthwaite; Lea Tahuhu
Melbourne Stars	Melbourne Cricket Ground (4)	Casey Fields (2)	David Hemp	Kristen Beams (Note: Erin Osborne stood in as acting captain for two games.)	Kristen Beams; Erin Osborne	Mignon du Preez; Georgia Elwiss; Lizelle Lee; Katey Martin
Perth Scorchers	WACA Ground (4)	Lilac Hill Park (3); Perth Stadium (1)	Lisa Keightley	Elyse Villani	Nicole Bolton; Meg Lanning; Elyse Villani; Lauren Ebsary	Katherine Brunt; Nat Sciver; Thamsyn Newton
Sydney Sixers	Sydney Cricket Ground (3)	Hurstville Oval (3); North Dalton Park (1); North Sydney Oval (1)	Ben Sawyer	Ellyse Perry	Alyssa Healy; Ellyse Perry; Sarah Coyte; Sarah Aley; Lauren Cheatle; Ashleigh Gardner	Marizanne Kapp; Sara McGlashan; Dane van Niekerk; Amy Jones
Sydney Thunder	North Sydney Oval (2)	Robertson Oval (2); Howell Oval (1); Lavington Sports Oval (1); Manuka Oval (1)	Joanne Broadbent	Alex Blackwell	Alex Blackwell; Rene Farrell; Rachael Haynes; Naomi Stalenberg; Belinda Vakarewa	Harmanpreet Kaur; Rachel Priest; Stafanie Taylor; Fran Wilson

=== Personnel changes ===
==== Local players ====
The table below lists local player movements made ahead of the season.

Player	Departed	→	Joined	Notes	Ref(s)
Rhiannon Dick	Sydney Sixers	→	Adelaide Strikers		
Sarah Coyte	Adelaide Strikers	→	–	Signed with the Sydney Sixers as a replacement player during the season	
Sarah Elliott	Adelaide Strikers	→	–	Retired	
Shelley Nitschke	Adelaide Strikers	→	–	Retired	
Grace Harris	Melbourne Renegades	→	Brisbane Heat	Australian marquee; Returning to the Brisbane Heat	
Stefanie Daffara	Sydney Thunder	→	Hobart Hurricanes		
Nicola Hancock	–	→	Hobart Hurricanes	Previously played for the Melbourne Renegades	
Erin Burns	Hobart Hurricanes	→	Sydney Sixers		
Julie Hunter	Hobart Hurricanes	→	–	Retired	
Jess Duffin	Melbourne Stars	→	Melbourne Renegades	Australian marquee	
Hayley Jensen	Melbourne Stars	→	Melbourne Renegades		
Emma Inglis	Melbourne Stars	→	Melbourne Renegades		
Claire Koski	Sydney Thunder	→	Melbourne Renegades		
Annabel Sutherland	Melbourne Renegades	→	Melbourne Stars		
Erin Osborne	Sydney Thunder	→	Melbourne Stars	Australian marquee	
Mikayla Hinkley	Sydney Thunder	→	Perth Scorchers		
Meg Lanning	Melbourne Stars	→	Perth Scorchers	Australian marquee; Outgoing captain (13–14 win–loss record); Unavailable for the season due to injury	
Lauren Cheatle	Sydney Thunder	→	Sydney Sixers		
Lisa Sthalekar	Sydney Sixers	→	–	Retired	

Changes made during the season included:

- Sarah Coyte signed with the Sydney Sixers as a marquee replacement player.

==== Overseas players ====
The table below lists changes to overseas marquee allocations made ahead of the season.

Player	Departed	→	Joined	Notes	Ref(s)
Suzie Bates	Perth Scorchers	→	Adelaide Strikers	Outgoing captain (9–7 win–loss record)	
Charlotte Edwards	Adelaide Strikers	→	–	Retired	
Smriti Mandhana	Brisbane Heat	→	–		
Veda Krishnamurthy	–	→	Hobart Hurricanes		
Lauren Winfield	Brisbane Heat	→	Hobart Hurricanes	Replacement player in WBBL|02	
Amy Satterthwaite	Hobart Hurricanes	→	Melbourne Renegades		
Heather Knight	Hobart Hurricanes	→	–	Outgoing captain (15–14 win–loss record)	
Chamari Atapattu	–	→	Melbourne Renegades		
Rachel Priest	Melbourne Renegades	→	Sydney Thunder	Outgoing captain (6–10 win–loss record)	
Danni Wyatt	Melbourne Renegades	→	–		
Mignon du Preez	–	→	Melbourne Stars	Returning to the Melbourne Stars	
Georgia Elwiss	–	→	Melbourne Stars		
Lizelle Lee	–	→	Melbourne Stars		
Morna Nielsen	Melbourne Stars	→	–		
Nat Sciver	Melbourne Stars	→	Perth Scorchers		
Danielle Hazell	Melbourne Stars	→	–	Replacement player in WBBL|02	
Anya Shrubsole	Perth Scorchers	→	–		
Thamsyn Newton	–	→	Perth Scorchers	Replacement player for Meg Lanning	

Changes made during the season included:

- South Africa marquee Laura Wolvaardt signed with the Brisbane Heat as a replacement player.
- Ireland marquee Isobel Joyce returned to the Hobart Hurricanes as a replacement player.
- New Zealand marquee Katey Martin signed with the Melbourne Stars as a replacement player.
- England marquee Amy Jones signed with the Sydney Sixers as a replacement player.
- England marquee Fran Wilson signed with the Sydney Thunder as a replacement player.

==== Leadership ====
Coaching changes made ahead of the season included:

- Peter McGiffin was appointed head coach of the Brisbane Heat, replacing Andy Richards.
- Tim Coyle was appointed head coach of the Melbourne Renegades, replacing Lachlan Stevens.

Captaincy changes made ahead of the season included:

- Suzie Bates was appointed captain of the Adelaide Strikers, replacing Tegan McPharlin (3–9 win–loss record).
- Corinne Hall was appointed captain of the Hobart Hurricanes, replacing Heather Knight (15–14 win–loss record).
- Amy Satterthwaite was appointed captain of the Melbourne Renegades, replacing Rachel Priest (6–10 win–loss record).
- Kristen Beams was appointed captain of the Melbourne Stars, replacing Meg Lanning (13–14 win–loss record).
- Elyse Villani assumed the captaincy of the Perth Scorchers, replacing Suzie Bates (9–7 win–loss record).

Captaincy changes made during the season included:

- Isobel Joyce stood in as acting captain of the Hobart Hurricanes for five games.
- Erin Osborne stood in as acting captain of the Melbourne Stars for two games.

== Standings ==
=== Points table ===
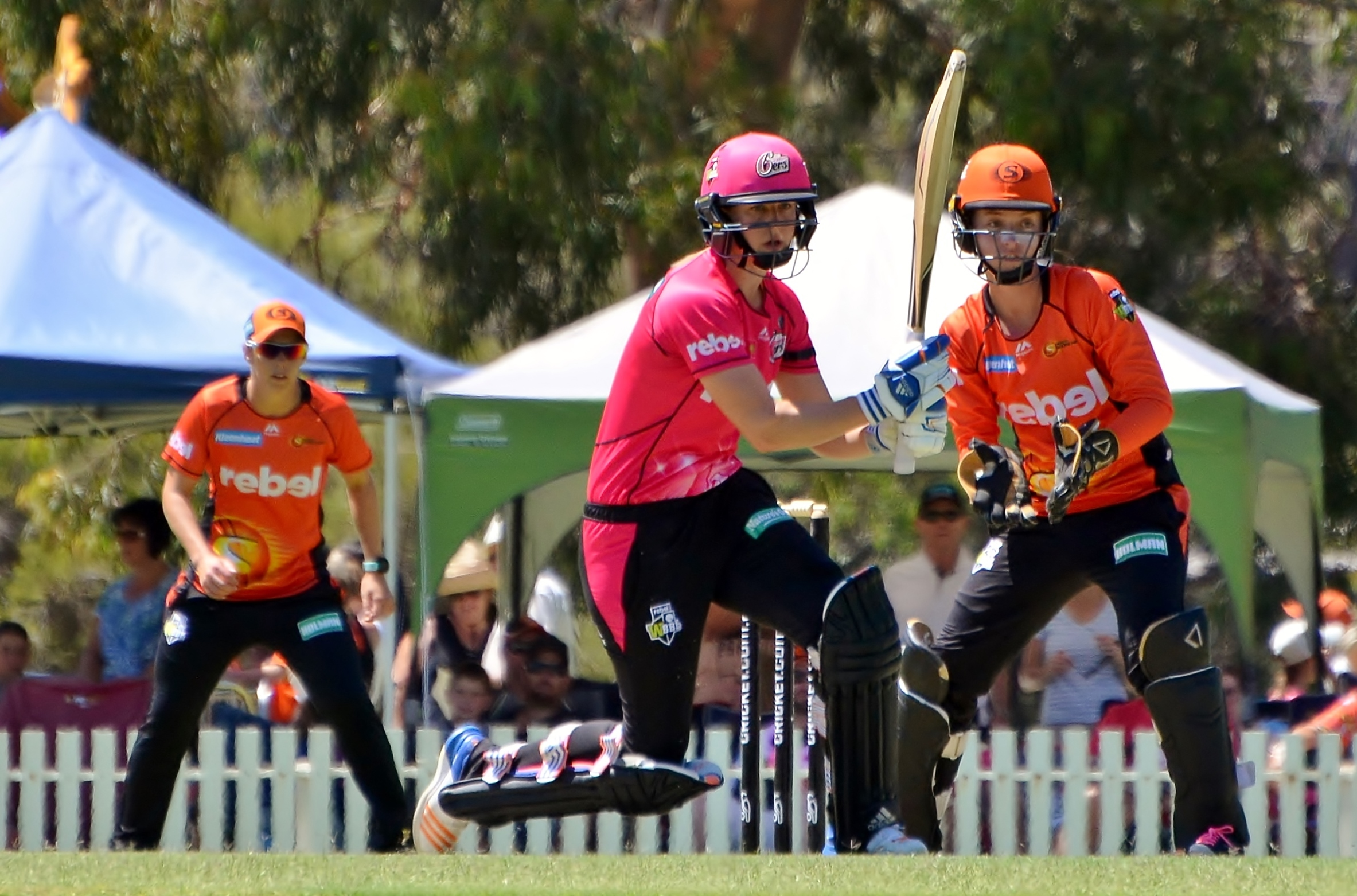
Ellyse Perry top scored with 45 for Sydney Sixers against Perth Scorchers at Lilac Hill Park, Perth, on 30 December 2017, but that was not enough to win the match. The wicket-keeper is Emily Smith, and the other fielder is Mathilda Carmichael.

Pos	Team	Pld	W	L	NR	Pts	NRR
1	Sydney Sixers (C)	14	10	4	0	20	0.890
2	Sydney Thunder	14	10	4	0	20	0.684
3	Perth Scorchers (RU)	14	8	6	0	16	0.266
4	Adelaide Strikers	14	8	6	0	16	0.250
5	Brisbane Heat	14	7	7	0	14	0.147
6	Melbourne Renegades	14	6	8	0	12	0.092
7	Melbourne Stars	14	5	9	0	10	−0.634
8	Hobart Hurricanes	14	2	12	0	4	−1.733

- The top four teams qualified for the play-off phase.

=== Win–loss table ===
Below is a summary of results for each team's fourteen regular season matches, plus finals where applicable, in chronological order. A team's opponent for any given match is listed above the margin of victory/defeat.

Team	1	2	3	4	5	6	7	8	9	10	11	12	13	14	SF	F	Pos.
Adelaide Strikers (ADS)	HBH; 45 runs	HBH; 83 runs	MLR; 1 run	MLR; 9 runs	BRH; 9 wkts	BRH; 8 wkts	MLS; 22 runs	MLS; 1 wkt	PRS; 6 wkts	PRS; 31 runs	SYT; 37 runs	SYT; S/O	SYS; 7 wkts	SYS; 7 wkts	SYS; 17 runs	X	4th (SF)
Brisbane Heat (BRH)	PRS; 18 runs	PRS; 6 wkts	MLR; 8 runs	MLR; 10 wkts	ADS; 9 wkts	ADS; 8 wkts	HBH; 8 wkts	HBH; 42 runs	MLS; 5 wkts	MLS; 6 wkts	SYS; 9 runs	SYS; 18 runs	SYT; 6 wkts	SYT; 2 runs	X	X	5th
Hobart Hurricanes (HBH)	ADS; 45 runs	ADS; 83 runs	SYS; 33 runs	SYS; 9 wkts	SYT; 7 wkts	SYT; 8 wkts	BRH; 8 wkts	BRH; 42 runs	MLR; 10 wkts	MLR; 4 runs	PRS; 9 wkts	PRS; 6 wkts	MLS; 7 wkts	MLS; 2 runs	X	X	8th
Melbourne Renegades (MLR)	SYT; 11 runs	ADS; 1 run	ADS; 9 runs	BRH; 8 runs	BRH; 10 wkts	SYS; 36 runs	SYS; S/O	MLS; 7 wkts	HBH; 10 wkts	HBH; 4 runs	MLS; S/O	SYT; 4 wkts	PRS; 4 wkts	PRS; 4 wkts	X	X	6th
Melbourne Stars (MLS)	SYS; 86 runs	SYT; 8 wkts	SYT; 9 wkts	PRS; 9 wkts	PRS; 12 runs	ADS; 22 runs	MLR; 7 wtks	ADS; 1 wkt	BRH; 5 wkts	BRH; 6 wkts	MLR; S/O	SYS; 5 wkts	HBH; 7 wkts	HBH; 2 runs	X	X	7th
Perth Scorchers (PRS)	BRH; 18 runs	SYS; 9 wkts	BRH; 6 wkts	MLS; 9 wkts	MLS; 12 runs	SYS; 6 wkts	SYT; 1 run	SYT; 8 wkts	ADS; 6 wkts	ADS; 31 runs	HBH; 9 wkts	HBH; 6 wkts	MLR; 4 wkts	MLR; 4 wkts	SYT; 27 runs	SYS; 9 wkts	3rd (RU)
Sydney Sixers (SYS)	MLS; 86 runs	SYT; 6 wkts	PRS; 9 wkts	HBH; 33 runs	HBH; 9 wkts	PRS; 6 wkts	MLR; 36 runs	MLR; S/O	SYT; 4 wkts	BRH; 9 runs	BRH; 18 runs	MLS; 5 wkts	ADS; 7 wkts	ADS; 7 wkts	ADS; 17 runs	PRS; 9 wkts	1st (C)
Sydney Thunder (SYT)	MLR; 11 runs	SYS; 6 wkts	MLS; 8 wkts	MLS; 9 wkts	HBH; 7 wkts	HBH; 8 wkts	PRS; 1 run	PRS; 8 wkts	SYS; 4 wkts	ADS; 37 runs	ADS; S/O	MLR; 4 wkts	BRH; 6 wkts	BRH; 2 runs	PRS; 27 runs	X	2nd (SF)

Team's results→	Won	Tied	Lost	N/R

== Fixtures ==
=== Week 1 ===
Match 1
9 December 2017
13:45
Scorecard

Sydney Thunder; 6/200 (20 overs)	v	Melbourne Renegades; 6/189 (20 overs)
Rachael Haynes 55 (41); Maitlan Brown 1/29 (4 overs)		Jess Duffin 81 (47); Stafanie Taylor 2/30 (4 overs)

Sydney Thunder won by 11 runs
North Sydney Oval No. 2
Umpires: Ryan Nelson and David Shepard
Player of the match: Jess Duffin (Renegades)

- Melbourne Renegades won the toss and elected to field
- Broadcast by Network Ten

Match 2
9 December 2017
14:30
Scorecard

Adelaide Strikers; 3/183 (20 overs)	v	Hobart Hurricanes; 9/138 (20 overs)
Sophie Devine 46 (21); Brooke Hepburn 2/35 (4 overs)		Hayley Matthews 35 (27); Tahlia McGrath 2/15 (3 overs)

Adelaide Strikers won by 45 runs
Gliderol Stadium, Glenelg
Umpires: Steven Farrell and Luke Uthenwoldt
Player of the match: Sophie Devine (Strikers)

- Hobart Hurricanes won the toss and elected to field
- Streamed on cricket.com.au

Match 3
9 December 2017
18:15 (D/N)
Scorecard

Sydney Sixers; 4/242 (20 overs)	v	Melbourne Stars; 7/156 (20 overs)
Ashleigh Gardner 114 (52); Erin Osborne 2/33 (4 overs)		Lizelle Lee 64 (36); Sarah Aley 2/30 (4 overs)

Sydney Sixers won by 86 runs
North Sydney Oval No. 2
Umpires: Marc Nickl and Ben Treloar
Player of the match: Ashleigh Gardner (Sixers)

- Melbourne Stars won the toss and elected to field
- Broadcast by Network Ten

Match 4
10 December 2017
10:45
Scorecard

Perth Scorchers; 6/188 (20 overs)	v	Brisbane Heat; 9/170 (20 overs)
Natalie Sciver 84 (46); Sammy-Jo Johnson 2/24 (4 overs)		Delissa Kimmince 87* (54); Katherine Brunt 3/23 (4 overs)

Perth Scorchers won by 18 runs
North Sydney Oval No. 2
Umpires: Ryan Nelson and David Shepard
Player of the match: Natalie Sciver (Scorchers)

- Perth Scorchers won the toss and elected to bat
- Broadcast by Network Ten

Match 5
10 December 2017
12:30
Scorecard

Adelaide Strikers; 6/176 (20 overs)	v	Hobart Hurricanes; 93 (18.5 overs)
Suzie Bates 102 (65); Veronica Pyke 4/17 (4 overs)		Veda Krishnamurthy 21 (24); Amanda-Jade Wellington 3/9 (4 overs)

Adelaide Strikers won by 83 runs
Gliderol Stadium, Glenelg
Umpires: Craig Thomas and Luke Uthenwoldt
Player of the match: Suzie Bates (Strikers)

- Adelaide Strikers won the toss and elected to bat
- Streamed on cricket.com.au

Match 6
10 December 2017
14:00
Scorecard

Sydney Thunder; 6/142 (20 overs)	v	Sydney Sixers; 4/146 (18.4 overs)
Alex Blackwell 58 (52); Ellyse Perry 2/15 (4 overs)		Alyssa Healy 49 (27); Stafanie Taylor 1/27 (3 overs)

Sydney Sixers won by 6 wickets (with 8 balls remaining)
North Sydney Oval No. 2
Umpires: Marc Nickl and Ben Treloar
Player of the match: Alyssa Healy (Sixers)

- Sydney Thunder won the toss and elected to bat
- Broadcast by Network Ten

Match 7
12 December 2017
12:00
Scorecard

Sydney Sixers; 8/122 (20 overs)	v	Perth Scorchers; 1/123 (18.2 overs)
Erin Burns 33 (25); Katherine Brunt, Emma King 2/19 (4 overs)		Elyse Villani 74* (61); Sarah Aley 1/22 (4 overs)

Perth Scorchers won by 9 wickets (with 10 balls remaining)
North Dalton Park, Wollongong
Umpires: Ryan Nelson and Marc Nickl
Player of the match: Elyse Villani (Scorchers)

- Perth Scorchers won the toss and elected to field
- Streamed on cricket.com.au

Match 8
12 December 2017
14:00
Scorecard

Melbourne Stars; 8/114 (20 overs)	v	Sydney Thunder; 2/115 (14.3 overs)
Lizelle Lee 31 (25); Harmanpreet Kaur 3/18 (4 overs)		Rachael Haynes 54 (33); Emma Kearney 1/25 (3 overs)

Sydney Thunder won by 8 wickets (with 33 balls remaining)
Lavington Sports Oval, Albury
Umpires: Dinusha Bandara and Andrew Crozier
Player of the match: Rachael Haynes (Thunder)

- Sydney Thunder won the toss and elected to field
- Streamed on cricket.com.au

=== Week 2 ===
Match 9
15 December 2017
14:00
Scorecard

Perth Scorchers; 7/112 (20 overs)	v	Brisbane Heat; 4/116 (18.5 overs)
Katherine Brunt 29 (32); Delissa Kimmince 2/17 (4 overs)		Kirby Short 50* (48); Katherine Brunt 2/17 (4 overs)

Brisbane Heat won by 6 wickets (with 7 balls remaining)
Allan Border Field, Brisbane
Umpires: Murray Branch and Steven Farrell
Player of the match: Deandra Dottin (Heat)

- Perth Scorchers won the toss and elected to bat
- Streamed on cricket.com.au

Match 10
16 December 2017
13:00
Scorecard

Melbourne Stars; 4/132 (20 overs)	v	Sydney Thunder; 1/135 (15.1 overs)
Mignon du Preez 58 (48); Samantha Bates 1/16 (4 overs)		Rachael Haynes 78* (49); Erin Osborne 1/26 (4 overs)

Sydney Thunder won by 9 wickets (with 29 balls remaining)
Howell Oval, Penrith
Umpires: Ryan Nelson and G Stubbings
Player of the match: Rachael Haynes (Thunder)

- Sydney Thunder won the toss and elected to field
- Streamed on cricket.com.au

Match 11
16 December 2017
14:00
Scorecard

Adelaide Strikers; 6/139 (20 overs)	v	Melbourne Renegades; 8/138 (20 overs)
Tammy Beaumont 45 (44); Hayley Jensen 1/17 (2 overs)		Amy Satterthwaite 56 (40); Tahlia McGrath 2/27 (4 overs)

Adelaide Strikers won by 1 run
Gliderol Stadium, Glenelg
Umpires: Craig Thomas and Luke Uthenwoldt
Player of the match: Tahlia McGrath (Strikers)

- Melbourne Renegades won the toss and elected to field
- Streamed on cricket.com.au

Match 12
17 December 2017
14:00
Scorecard

Sydney Sixers; 8/152 (20 overs)	v	Hobart Hurricanes; 8/119 (20 overs)
Ellyse Perry 65 (49); Hayley Matthews 2/29 (4 overs)		Veronica Pyke 35* (26); Dane van Niekerk 4/20 (4 overs)

Sydney Sixers won by 33 runs
Blundstone Arena, Hobart
Umpires: Muhammad Qureshi and Harvey Wolff
Player of the match: Dane van Niekerk (Sixers)

- Sydney Sixers won the toss and elected to bat
- Streamed on cricket.com.au
- Dane van Niekerk became the fourth player to take a hat-trick in the WBBL

Match 13
17 December 2017
14:00
Scorecard

Melbourne Renegades; 5/160 (20 overs)	v	Adelaide Strikers; 9/151 (20 overs)
Amy Satterthwaite 49 (37); Sophie Devine 2/25 (4 overs)		Suzie Bates 63 (38); Lea Tahuhu 2/20 (4 overs)

Melbourne Renegades won by 9 runs
Gliderol Stadium, Glenelg
Umpires: Craig Thomas and Luke Uthenwoldt
Player of the match: Amy Satterthwaite (Renegades)

- Melbourne Renegades won the toss and elected to bat
- Streamed on cricket.com.au

=== Week 3 ===
Match 14
22 December 2017
14:00
Scorecard

Melbourne Renegades; 6/133 (20 overs)	v	Brisbane Heat; 125 (19.5 overs)
Sophie Molineux 40 (32); Delissa Kimmince 2/26 (4 overs)		Beth Mooney 39 (28); Molly Strano 3/16 (4 overs)

Melbourne Renegades won by 8 runs
Camberwell Sports Ground, Melbourne
Umpires: Daryl Brigham and Dale Ireland
Player of the match: Amy Satterthwaite (Renegades)

- Brisbane Heat won the toss and elected to field
- Streamed on cricket.com.au

Match 15
23 December 2017
12:20
Scorecard

Hobart Hurricanes; 98 (19.4 overs)	v	Sydney Sixers; 1/99 (13.5 overs)
Veda Krishnamurthy 16 (17); Dane van Niekerk 2/18 (4 overs)		Erin Burns 48* (38); Nicola Hancock 1/14 (2 overs)

Sydney Sixers won by 9 wickets (with 37 balls remaining)
Sydney Cricket Ground, Sydney
Umpires: Ryan Nelson and Claire Polosak
Player of the match: Marizanne Kapp (Sixers)

- Hobart Hurricanes won the toss and elected to bat
- Broadcast by Network Ten
- Double header with Match 5 of the Men's BBL

Match 16
23 December 2017
14:30
Scorecard

Brisbane Heat; 66 (16.1 overs)	v	Melbourne Renegades; 0/67 (10.5 overs)
Deandra Dottin 14 (20); Amy Satterthwaite 2/5 (2 overs)		Sophie Molineux 45* (37)

Melbourne Renegades won by 10 wickets (with 55 balls remaining)
Etihad Stadium, Melbourne
Umpires: Daryl Brigham and Dale Ireland
Player of the match: Sophie Molineux (Renegades)

- Brisbane Heat won the toss and elected to bat
- Streamed on cricket.com.au
- Double header with Match 6 of the Men's BBL
- Brisbane Heat's total of 66 equalled the record for lowest all out WBBL team score

Match 17
26 December 2017
11:20
Scorecard

Melbourne Stars; 4/163 (20 overs)	v	Perth Scorchers; 1/164 (18.3 overs)
Lizelle Lee 76 (62); Emma King 2/24 (4 overs)		Elyse Villani 84* (53); Erin Osborne 1/24 (4 overs)

Perth Scorchers won by 9 wickets (with 9 balls remaining)
WACA Ground, Perth
Umpires: Ashlee Kovalevs and John Taylor
Player of the match: Nicole Bolton (Scorchers)

- Perth Scorchers won the toss and elected to field
- Streamed on cricket.com.au
- Double header with Match 7 of the Men's BBL

Match 18
27 December 2017
11:30
Scorecard

Melbourne Stars; 6/149 (20 overs)	v	Perth Scorchers; 4/137 (20 overs)
Georgia Elwiss 25 (24); Katherine Brunt 2/13 (3 overs)		Elyse Villani 72 (44); Alana King 1/11 (2 overs)

Melbourne Stars won by 12 runs
WACA Ground, Perth
Umpires: James Hewitt and John Taylor
Player of the match: Elyse Villani (Scorchers)

- Melbourne Stars won the toss and elected to bat
- Streamed on cricket.com.au

=== Week 4 ===
Match 19
29 December 2017
14:30
Scorecard

Adelaide Strikers; 6/113 (20 overs)	v	Brisbane Heat; 1/114 (16 overs)
Bridget Patterson 32 (30); Deandra Dottin 2/13 (3 overs)		Beth Mooney 86* (57); Amanda Wellington 1/24 (4 overs)

Brisbane Heat won by 9 wickets (with 24 balls remaining)
Adelaide Oval, Adelaide
Umpires: Steven Farrell and Luke Uthenwoldt
Player of the match: Beth Mooney (Heat)

- Brisbane Heat won the toss and elected to field
- Streamed on cricket.com.au

Match 20
30 December 2017
13:00
Scorecard

Sydney Sixers; 138 (19.5 overs)	v	Perth Scorchers; 4/139 (18.5 overs)
Ellyse Perry 45 (47); Nicole Bolton 2/15 (3 overs)		Elyse Villani 63 (43); Dane van Niekerk 2/24 (4 overs)

Perth Scorchers won by 6 wickets (with 7 balls remaining)
Lilac Hill, Perth
Umpires: John Taylor and Trent Steenholdt
Player of the match: Nicole Bolton (Scorchers)

- Sydney Sixers won the toss and elected to bat
- Streamed on cricket.com.au

Match 21
30 December 2017
14:20
Scorecard

Hobart Hurricanes; 8/112 (20 overs)	v	Sydney Thunder; 3/116 (16.2 overs)
Hayley Matthews 39 (40); Stafanie Taylor 4/15 (4 overs)		Rachael Haynes 64 (49); Brooke Hepburn 2/14 (3 overs)

Sydney Thunder won by 7 wickets (with 22 balls remaining)
University of Tasmania Stadium, Launceston
Umpires: Muhammad Qureshi and G Beechey
Player of the match: Stafanie Taylor (Thunder)

- Hobart Hurricanes won the toss and elected to bat
- Streamed on cricket.com.au

Match 22
31 December 2017
11:00
Scorecard

Hobart Hurricanes; 97 (19.4 overs)	v	Sydney Thunder; 2/99 (15 overs)
Stefanie Daffara 30 (32); Samantha Bates 3/12 (4 overs)		Alex Blackwell 43* (34); Celeste Raack 1/14 (3 overs)

Sydney Thunder won by 8 wickets (with 30 balls remaining)
University of Tasmania Stadium, Launceston
Umpires: Muhammad Qureshi and Darren Close
Player of the match: Samantha Bates (Thunder)

- Hobart Hurricanes won the toss and elected to bat
- Streamed on cricket.com.au

Match 23
31 December 2017
13:45
Scorecard

Adelaide Strikers; 7/119 (20 overs)	v	Brisbane Heat; 2/122 (16.2 overs)
Bridget Patterson 37 (29); Haidee Birkett 3/15 (3 overs)		Beth Mooney 81* (48); Amanda Wellington 1/17 (3.2 overs)

Brisbane Heat won by 8 wickets (with 22 balls remaining)
Adelaide Oval, Adelaide
Umpires: Nathan Johnstone and Craig Thomas
Player of the match: Beth Mooney (Heat)

- Brisbane Heat won the toss and elected to field
- Broadcast by Network Ten

Match 24
2 January 2018
14:00
Scorecard

Sydney Sixers; 7/128 (20 overs)	v	Melbourne Renegades; 92 (19 overs)
Ellyse Perry 64 (56); Hayley Jensen 2/13 (3 overs)		Jess Duffin 35 (42); Dane van Niekerk 4/13 (4 overs)

Sydney Sixers won by 36 runs
Camberwell Sports Ground, Melbourne
Umpires: Dale Ireland and Daryl Brigham
Player of the match: Ellyse Perry (Sixers)

- Melbourne Renegades won the toss and elected to field
- Streamed on cricket.com.au

Match 25
3 January 2018
14:20
Scorecard

Melbourne Renegades; 7/120 (20 overs)	v	Sydney Sixers; 7/120 (20 overs)
Amy Satterthwaite 44 (44); Dane van Niekerk 2/25 (4 overs)		Ellyse Perry 37 (41); Chamari Atapattu 2/6 (2 overs)

Match Tied (Melbourne Renegades won the Super Over)
GMHBA Stadium, Geelong
Umpires: Stephen Brne and Dale Ireland
Player of the match: Amy Satterthwaite (Renegades)

- Melbourne Renegades won the toss and elected to bat
- Streamed on cricket.com.au

Match 26
3 January 2018
14:00
Scorecard

Adelaide Strikers; 5/144 (20 overs)	v	Melbourne Stars; 9/122 (20 overs)
Tammy Beaumont 46 (48); Georgia Elwiss 2/22 (4 overs)		Lizelle Lee 44 (42); Megan Schutt 2/23 (4 overs)

Adelaide Strikers won by 22 runs
Casey Fields No. 4, Melbourne
Umpires: Stephen Brne and Dale Ireland
Player of the match: Alex Price (Strikers)

- Melbourne Stars won the toss and elected to field
- Streamed on cricket.com.au

=== Week 5 ===
Match 27
6 January 2018
14:20
Scorecard

Melbourne Renegades; 6/142 (20 overs)	v	Melbourne Stars; 3/145 (19 overs)
Jess Duffin 40 (34); Erin Osborne 2/14 (4 overs)		Georgia Elwiss 59* (51); Lea Tahuhu 1/21 (3 overs)

Melbourne Stars won by 7 wickets (with 6 balls remaining)
Melbourne Cricket Ground
Umpires: Daryl Brigham and Dale Ireland
Player of the match: Georgia Elwiss (Stars)

- Melbourne Renegades won the toss and elected to bat
- Streamed on cricket.com.au

Match 28
7 January 2018
10:00
Scorecard

Hobart Hurricanes; 4/111 (20 overs)	v	Brisbane Heat; 2/114 (14.4 overs)
Hayley Matthews 34 (40); Jess Jonassen 2/17 (4 overs)		Beth Mooney 62* (43); Veda Krishnamurthy 1/18 (2 overs)

Brisbane Heat won by 8 wickets (with 32 balls remaining)
Blundstone Arena, Hobart
Umpires: Darren Close and Muhammad Qureshi
Player of the match: Beth Mooney (Heat)

- Brisbane Heat won the toss and elected to field
- Streamed on cricket.com.au

Match 29
7 January 2018
10:00
Scorecard

Sydney Thunder; 6/145 (20 overs)	v	Perth Scorchers; 6/144 (20 overs)
Rachel Priest 42 (32); Piepa Cleary 3/19 (3 overs)		Nicole Bolton 71 (57); Rene Farrell 2/19 (4 overs)

Sydney Thunder won by 1 run
Lilac Hill, Perth
Umpires: A Kovalevs and Trent Steenholdt
Player of the match: Rene Farrell (Thunder)

- Sydney Thunder won the toss and elected to bat
- Streamed on cricket.com.au

Match 30
8 January 2018
10:00
Scorecard

Brisbane Heat; 4/168 (20 overs)	v	Hobart Hurricanes; 126 (18.5 overs)
Kirby Short 79 (55); Emma Thompson 2/26 (4 overs)		Veda Krishnamurthy 33 (20); Haidee Birkett 2/18 (2.5 overs)

Brisbane Heat won by 42 runs
Blundstone Arena, Hobart
Umpires: Darren Close and Wade Stewart
Player of the match: Kirby Short (Heat)

- Hobart Hurricanes won the toss and elected to field
- Streamed on cricket.com.au

Match 31
8 January 2018
13:30
Scorecard

Sydney Thunder; 4/134 (20 overs)	v	Perth Scorchers; 2/136 (18.1 overs)
Alex Blackwell 81* (58); Katherine Brunt 1/13 (4 overs)		Natalie Sciver 61* (50); Maisy Gibson 1/18 (4 overs)

Perth Scorchers won by 8 wickets (with 11 balls remaining)
WACA Ground, Perth
Umpires: James Hewitt and A Kovalevs
Player of the match: Alex Blackwell (Thunder)

- Perth Scorchers won the toss and elected to field
- Streamed on cricket.com.au

Match 32
6 January 2018
14:20
Scorecard

Melbourne Stars; 5/132 (20 overs)	v	Adelaide Strikers; 9/134 (20 overs)
Lizelle Lee 52 (52); Sophie Devine 2/28 (4 overs)		Tabatha Saville 28* (27); Annabel Sutherland 4/20 (4 overs)

Adelaide Strikers won by 1 wicket (with 0 balls remaining)
Adelaide Oval
Umpires: David Shepard and Craig Thomas
Player of the match: Tabatha Saville (Strikers)

- Melbourne Stars won the toss and elected to bat
- Streamed on cricket.com.au

The Adelaide Strikers recorded the first-ever one-wicket victory in WBBL history, defeating the Melbourne Stars on the last ball of the match. Requiring three runs with one delivery remaining, Tabatha Saville scored a boundary off leg-spinning Stars captain Kristen Beams to clinch a narrow win for the Strikers.

Match 33
12 January 2018
18:30 (D/N)
Scorecard

Melbourne Stars; 3/133 (20 overs)	v	Brisbane Heat; 5/134 (18.1 overs)
Katie Mack 57 (48); Deandra Dottin 2/13 (3 overs)		Beth Mooney 57 (38); Alana King 2/22 (4 overs)

Brisbane Heat won by 5 wickets (with 11 balls remaining)
Harrup Park, Mackay
Umpires: Stephen Dionysius and David Taylor
Player of the match: Beth Mooney (Heat)

- Melbourne Stars won the toss and elected to bat
- Streamed on cricket.com.au

=== Week 6 ===
Match 34
13 January 2018
10:50
Scorecard

Perth Scorchers; 9/87 (16 overs)	v	Adelaide Strikers; 4/88 (15.5 overs)
Heather Graham 19 (17); Tahlia McGrath 3/17 (3 overs)		Suzie Bates 49* (47); Katherine Brunt 2/17 (4 overs)

Adelaide Strikers won by 6 wickets (with 1 ball remaining)
Traeger Park, Alice Springs
Umpires: Darren Close and Craig Thomas
Player of the match: Tahlia McGrath (Strikers)

- Adelaide Strikers won the toss and elected to field
- Match reduced to 16 overs per side due to rain delay
- Broadcast by Network Ten

Match 35
13 January 2018
14:30
Scorecard

Sydney Sixers; 113 (20 overs)	v	Sydney Thunder; 6/114 (19 overs)
Ellyse Perry 25 (25); Samantha Bates 3/21 (4 overs)		Naomi Stalenberg 48 (41); Sarah Aley 3/11 (4 overs)

Sydney Thunder won by 4 wickets (with 6 balls remaining)
Sydney Cricket Ground
Umpires: Anthony Hobson and G Stubbings
Player of the match: Naomi Stalenberg (Thunder)

- Sydney Sixers won the toss and elected to bat
- Streamed on cricket.com.au

Match 36
13 January 2018
18:30 (D/N)
Scorecard

Brisbane Heat; 8/93 (20 overs)	v	Melbourne Stars; 4/94 (17.2 overs)
Jess Jonassen 46 (46); Erin Osborne 4/20 (4 overs)		Mignon du Preez 36* (34); Sammy-Jo Johnson 2/26 (3.2 overs)

Melbourne Stars won by 6 wickets (with 16 balls remaining)
Harrup Park, Mackay
Umpires: Stephen Dionysius and David Taylor
Player of the match: Erin Osborne (Stars)

- Brisbane Heat won the toss and elected to bat
- Streamed on cricket.com.au

Match 37
14 January 2018
10:00
Scorecard

Hobart Hurricanes; 100 (18.5 overs)	v	Melbourne Renegades; 0/102 (17.2 overs)
Hayley Matthews 40 (40); Maitlan Brown 3/28 (3.5 overs)		Sophie Molineux 53* (39)

Melbourne Renegades won by 10 wickets (with 51 balls remaining)
Blundstone Arena, Hobart
Umpires: Wade Stewart and Muhammad Qureshi
Player of the match: Sophie Molineux (Renegades)

- Melbourne Renegades won the toss and elected to field
- Streamed on cricket.com.au

Match 38
14 January 2018
16:30 (D/N)
Scorecard

Adelaide Strikers; 7/107 (20 overs)	v	Perth Scorchers; 76 (17.3 overs)
Tahlia McGrath 34 (28); Katherine Brunt 2/15 (4 overs)		Nicole Bolton 30 (38); Alex Price 2/4 (1.3 overs)

Adelaide Strikers won by 31 runs
Traeger Park, Alice Springs
Umpires: Craig Thomas and Ben Treloar
Player of the match: Tahlia McGrath (Strikers)

- Perth Scorchers won the toss and elected to field
- Streamed on cricket.com.au

Match 39
15 January 2018
14:50
Scorecard

Hobart Hurricanes; 9/120 (20 overs)	v	Melbourne Renegades; 6/116 (20 overs)
Veda Krishnamurthy 40 (35); Lea Tahuhu 3/25 (4 overs)		Amy Satterthwaite 65 (58); Brooke Hepburn 3/24 (4 overs)

Hobart Hurricanes won by 4 runs
Blundstone Arena, Hobart
Umpires: G Beechey and Darren Close
Player of the match: Brooke Hepburn (Hurricanes)

- Melbourne Renegades won the toss and elected to field
- Streamed on cricket.com.au

Match 40
18 January 2018
14:30
Scorecard

Sydney Sixers; 5/160 (20 overs)	v	Brisbane Heat; 151 (20 overs)
Alyssa Healy 70 (43); Jemma Barsby 2/19 (3 overs)		Beth Mooney 60 (42); Sarah Aley 3/31 (4 overs)

Sydney Sixers won by 9 runs
Sydney Cricket Ground
Umpires: Anthony Hobson and Marc Nickl
Player of the match: Dane van Niekerk (Sixers)

- Sydney Sixers won the toss and elected to bat
- Streamed on cricket.com.au

=== Week 7 ===
Match 41
19 January 2018
14:00
Scorecard

Sydney Sixers; 7/144 (20 overs)	v	Brisbane Heat; 4/126 (20 overs)
Erin Burns 54* (39); Delissa Kimmince 3/23 (4 overs)		Jess Jonassen 55* (38); Lauren Smith 1/13 (3 overs)

Sydney Sixers won by 18 runs
Hurstville Oval, Sydney
Umpires: Anthony Hobson and T Penman
Player of the match: Erin Burns (Sixers)

- Sydney Sixers won the toss and elected to bat
- Streamed on cricket.com.au

Match 42
20 January 2018
13:45
Scorecard

Melbourne Stars; 6/118 (20 overs)	v	Melbourne Renegades; 6/118 (20 overs)
Alana King 22 (17); Molly Strano 1/17 (3 overs)		Amy Satterthwaite 31* (27); Annabel Sutherland 2/11 (4 overs)

Match Tied (Melbourne Stars won the Super Over)
Melbourne Cricket Ground
Umpires: Stephen Brne and David Shepard
Player of the match: Alana King (Stars)

- Melbourne Stars won the toss and elected to bat
- Broadcast by Network Ten

Match 43
20 January 2018
14:00
Scorecard

Sydney Thunder; 4/148 (20 overs)	v	Adelaide Strikers; 111 (19.2 overs)
Rachel Priest 51 (27); Tahlia McGrath 2/16 (4 overs)		Bridget Patterson 30 (20); Samantha Bates 3/21 (4 overs)

Sydney Thunder won by 37 runs
Robertson Oval, Wagga Wagga
Umpires: Andrew Scotford and D Young
Player of the match: Rachel Priest (Thunder)

- Sydney Thunder won the toss and elected to bat
- Streamed on cricket.com.au

Match 44
20 January 2018
13:30
Scorecard

Hobart Hurricanes; 4/122 (20 overs)	v	Perth Scorchers; 1/126 (16 overs)
Isobel Joyce 52* (47); Piepa Cleary 2/11 (3 overs)		Elyse Villani 70* (48); Nicola Hancock 1/25 (4 overs)

Perth Scorchers won by 9 wickets (with 24 balls remaining)
WACA Ground, Perth
Umpires: J Paterson and Trent Steenholdt
Player of the match: Elyse Villani (Scorchers)

- Perth Scorchers won the toss and elected to field
- Streamed on cricket.com.au

Match 45
21 January 2018
14:00
Scorecard

Hobart Hurricanes; 7/130 (20 overs)	v	Perth Scorchers; 4/134 (18.5 overs)
Georgia Redmayne 53 (49); Thamsyn Newton 1/7 (1 over)		Nicole Bolton 60* (61); Katelyn Fryett 2/20 (4 overs)

Perth Scorchers won by 6 wickets (with 7 balls remaining)
Lilac Hill Park, Perth
Umpires: James Hewitt and J Paterson
Player of the match: Nicole Bolton (Scorchers)

- Perth Scorchers won the toss and elected to field
- Streamed on cricket.com.au

Match 46
21 January 2018
14:00
Scorecard

Melbourne Stars; 7/106 (20 overs)	v	Sydney Sixers; 5/107 (18 overs)
Erin Osborne 39 (43); Marizanne Kapp 2/13 (4 overs)		Ellyse Perry 39* (45); Annabel Sutherland 1/13 (3 overs)

Sydney Sixers won by 5 wickets (with 12 balls remaining)
Casey Fields No. 4, Melbourne
Umpires: Stephen Brne and Dale Ireland
Player of the match: Ellyse Perry (Sixers)

- Melbourne Stars won the toss and elected to bat
- Streamed on cricket.com.au

Match 47
21 January 2018
14:00
Scorecard

Adelaide Strikers; 5/114 (20 overs)	v	Sydney Thunder; 4/114 (20 overs)
Suzie Bates 40 (43); Rene Farrell 2/21 (4 overs)		Naomi Stalenberg 29 (24); Amanda-Jade Wellington 2/21 (4 overs)

Match Tied (Adelaide Strikers won the Super Over)
Robertson Oval, Wagga Wagga
Umpires: Andrew Scotford and D Young
Player of the match: Sophie Devine (Strikers)

- Adelaide Strikers won the toss and elected to bat
- Streamed on cricket.com.au

Match 48
24 January 2018
14:50
Scorecard

Melbourne Renegades; 68 (15.5 overs)	v	Sydney Thunder; 6/69 (16 overs)
Amy Satterthwaite 17 (19); Nicola Carey 3/10 (3.5 overs)		Rachael Haynes 37 (36); Hayley Jensen 3/11 (3 overs)

Sydney Thunder won by 4 wickets (with 24 balls remaining)
Manuka Oval, Canberra
Umpires: Dinusha Bandara and Andrew Crozier
Player of the match: Nicola Carey (Thunder)

- Sydney Thunder won the toss and elected to field
- Streamed on cricket.com.au

=== Week 8 ===
Match 49
27 January 2018
12:20
Scorecard

Hobart Hurricanes; 7/107 (20 overs)	v	Melbourne Stars; 3/108 (18 overs)
Hayley Matthews 34 (30); Alana King 2/23 (4 overs)		Katie Mack 42 (44); Nicola Hancock 2/18 (4 overs)

Melbourne Stars won by 7 wickets (with 12 balls remaining)
Melbourne Cricket Ground
Umpires: Daryl Brigham and Darren Close
Player of the match: Katie Mack (Stars)

- Melbourne Stars won the toss and elected to field
- Broadcast by Network Ten

Match 50
27 January 2018
14:00
Scorecard

Adelaide Strikers; 4/149 (20 overs)	v	Sydney Sixers; 3/150 (19.2 overs)
Sophie Devine 70 (45); Sarah Coyte 2/14 (4 overs)		Alyssa Healy 106 (66); Megan Schutt 1/26 (4 overs)

Sydney Sixers won by 7 wickets (with 4 balls remaining)
Hurstville Oval, Sydney
Umpires: Anthony Hobson and T Penman
Player of the match: Alyssa Healy (Sixers)

- Adelaide Strikers won the toss and elected to bat
- Streamed on cricket.com.au

Match 51
27 January 2018
14:00
Scorecard

Perth Scorchers; 7/124 (20 overs)	v	Melbourne Renegades; 6/125 (19.2 overs)
Lauren Ebsary 61* (44); Maitlan Brown 2/18 (4 overs)		Sophie Molineux 62 (45); Emma King 2/14 (3 overs)

Melbourne Renegades won by 4 wickets (with 4 balls remaining)
Camberwell Sports Ground, Melbourne
Umpires: Andrew Crozier and Dale Ireland
Player of the match: Sophie Molineux (Renegades)

- Melbourne Renegades won the toss and elected to field
- Streamed on cricket.com.au

Match 52
27 January 2018
13:30
Scorecard

Sydney Thunder; 5/145 (20 overs)	v	Brisbane Heat; 4/146 (18 overs)
Rachael Haynes 43 (30); Jemma Barsby 2/32 (4 overs)		Grace Harris 57 (45); Samantha Bates 2/23 (3 overs)

Brisbane Heat won by 6 wickets (with 12 balls remaining)
Brisbane Cricket Ground
Umpires: Murray Branch and Stephen Dionysius
Player of the match: Grace Harris (Heat)

- Sydney Thunder won the toss and elected to bat
- Streamed on cricket.com.au

Match 53
28 January 2018
12:00
Scorecard

Hobart Hurricanes; 6/130 (20 overs)	v	Melbourne Stars; 7/128 (20 overs)
Hayley Matthews 44 (44); Erin Osborne 3/23 (4 overs)		Erin Osborne 30 (29); Nicola Hancock 2/22 (4 overs)

Hobart Hurricanes won by 2 runs
Melbourne Cricket Ground
Umpires: Stephen Brne and Dale Ireland
Player of the match: Hayley Matthews (Hurricanes)

- Melbourne Stars won the toss and elected to field
- Streamed on cricket.com.au

Match 54
28 January 2018
14:00
Scorecard

Melbourne Renegades; 9/112 (20 overs)	v	Perth Scorchers; 6/113 (16.1 overs)
Emma Inglis 28 (19); Katherine Brunt 3/11 (4 overs)		Natalie Sciver 39* (33); Georgia Wareham 3/19 (4 overs)

Perth Scorchers won by 4 wickets (with 23 balls remaining)
Camberwell Sports Ground, Melbourne
Umpires: Daryl Brigham and Andrew Crozier
Player of the match: Katherine Brunt (Scorchers)

- Perth Scorchers won the toss and elected to field
- Streamed on cricket.com.au
- Former Australian player Kris Britt made her last WBBL appearance

Match 55
28 January 2018
14:00
Scorecard

Adelaide Strikers; 9/111 (20 overs)	v	Sydney Sixers; 2/112 (18.1 overs)
Tammy Beaumont 28 (31); Sarah Coyte 3/18 (4 overs)		Alyssa Healy 63 (52); Alex Price 1/16 (2 overs)

Sydney Sixers won by 7 wickets (with 11 balls remaining)
Hurstville Oval, Sydney
Umpires: T Penman and G Stubbings
Player of the match: Sarah Coyte (Sixers)

- Adelaide Strikers won the toss and elected to bat
- Streamed on cricket.com.au

Match 56
28 January 2018
14:00
Scorecard

Sydney Thunder; 8/117 (20 overs)	v	Brisbane Heat; 115 (17.4 overs)
Nicola Carey 26 (26); Jemma Barsby 4/2 (2 overs)		Jess Jonassen 33 (21); Belinda Vakarewa 3/17 (4 overs)

Sydney Thunder won by 2 runs
Allan Border Field, Brisbane
Umpires: Murray Branch and Steven Farrell
Player of the match: Belinda Vakarewa (Thunder)

- Brisbane Heat won the toss and elected to field
- Streamed on cricket.com.au

== Knockout phase ==
All knockout phase matches were played as double headers with the men's tournament, hence the venues for both semi-finals and the final were determined using the standings of the BBL|07 points table.

Semifinals
2	Sydney Thunder	8/121
3	Perth Scorchers	2/148
1	Sydney Sixers	5/138
4	Adelaide Strikers	9/121

Finals
3	Perth Scorchers	99
1	Sydney Sixers	1/100

=== Semi-finals ===
Semi-final 1
1 February 2018
12:10
Scorecard

Perth Scorchers; 2/148 (20 overs)	v	Sydney Thunder; 8/121 (20 overs)
Natalie Sciver 38 (28); Stafanie Taylor 1/23 (4 overs)		Fran Wilson 46 (28); Emma King 3/17 (4 overs)

Perth Scorchers won by 27 runs
Optus Stadium, Perth
Umpires: Geoff Joshua and Tony Wilds
Player of the match: Emma King (Scorchers)

- Sydney Thunder won the toss and elected to field
- Played as a double header with BBL semi-final 1
- Broadcast by Network Ten

Semi-final 2
2 February 2018
14:40
Scorecard

Sydney Sixers; 5/138 (20 overs)	v	Adelaide Strikers; 9/121 (20 overs)
Ashleigh Gardner 72 (45); Sophie Devine 2/21 (4 overs)		Tammy Beaumont 50 (46); Sarah Aley 4/18 (4 overs)

Sydney Sixers won by 17 runs
Adelaide Oval, Adelaide
Umpires: Michael Graham-Smith and John Ward
Player of the match: Sarah Aley (Sixers)

- Sydney Sixers won the toss and elected to bat
- Played as a double header with BBL semi-final 2
- Broadcast by Network Ten

=== Final ===
4 February 2018
11:50
Scorecard

Perth Scorchers; 99 (20 overs)	v	Sydney Sixers; 1/100 (15 overs)
Piepa Cleary 18* (14); Sarah Coyte 4/17 (3 overs)		Alyssa Healy 41 (32); Emma King 1/26

Sydney Sixers won by 9 wickets (with 30 balls remaining)
Adelaide Oval, Adelaide
Umpires: Greg Davidson and John Ward
Player of the match: Sarah Coyte (Sixers)

- Perth Scorchers won the toss and elected to bat
- Sydney Sixers won their second WBBL title
- Played as a double header with BBL final
- Broadcast by Network Ten

== Statistics ==
=== Highest totals ===
Team	Score	Against	Venue	Date
Sydney Sixers	4/242 (20 overs)	Melbourne Stars	North Sydney Oval	9 December 2017
Sydney Thunder	6/200 (20 overs)	Melbourne Renegades	North Sydney Oval	9 December 2017
Melbourne Renegades	6/189 (20 overs)	Sydney Thunder	North Sydney Oval	9 December 2017
Perth Scorchers	6/188 (20 overs)	Brisbane Heat	North Sydney Oval	10 December 2017
Adelaide Strikers	3/183 (20 overs)	Hobart Hurricanes	Gliderol Stadium	9 December 2017

- Source: CricInfo

=== Most runs ===
Player	Team	Runs
Ellyse Perry	Sydney Sixers|552	
Elyse Villani	Perth Scorchers	535
Nicole Bolton	Perth Scorchers	482
Beth Mooney	Brisbane Heat	465
Suzie Bates	Adelaide Strikers	434

- Source CricInfo

=== Most wickets ===
Player	Team	Wickets
Katherine Brunt	Perth Scorchers	23
Sarah Aley	Sydney Sixers	23
Dane van Niekerk	Sydney Sixers	20
Sophie Devine	Adelaide Strikers	17
Nicola Carey	Sydney Thunder	17

- Source: CricInfo

== Awards ==
=== Player of the tournament ===
Player of the Tournament votes are awarded on a 3-2-1 basis by the two standing umpires at the conclusion of every match, meaning a player can receive a maximum of six votes per game.

Pos.	Player	Team	Votes
1st	Amy Satterthwaite	Melbourne Renegades	35
2nd	Elyse Villani	Perth Scorchers	28
3rd	Ellyse Perry	Sydney Sixers	27
=4th	Beth Mooney	Brisbane Heat	25
=4th	Suzie Bates	Adelaide Strikers	25

Source: WBBL|03 Player of the tournament

=== Team of the tournament ===
An honorary XI recognising the standout performers of WBBL|03 was named by bigbash.com.au:

- Elyse Villani (Perth Scorchers)
- Beth Mooney (Brisbane Heat)
- Ellyse Perry (Sydney Sixers)
- Nicole Bolton (Perth Scorchers)
- Sophie Devine (Adelaide Strikers)
- Dane van Niekerk (Sydney Sixers)
- Amy Satterthwaite (Melbourne Renegades)
- Katherine Brunt (Perth Scorchers)
- Rene Farrell (Sydney Thunder)
- Sarah Aley (Sydney Sixers)
- Lea Tahuhu (Melbourne Renegades)

=== Young gun award ===
Players under 21 years of age at the start of the season are eligible for the Young Gun Award. Weekly winners are selected over the course of the season by a panel of Cricket Australia officials based on match performance, on-field and off-field attitude, and their demonstration of skill, tenacity and good sportsmanship. Each weekly winner receives a $500 Rebel gift card and the overall winner receives a $5000 cash prize, as well as access to a learning and mentor program.

Melbourne Renegades all-rounder Sophie Molineux was named the Young Gun of WBBL|03 after scoring 318 runs and taking 6 wickets. The other nominees for the award were Sydney Sixers' Ashleigh Gardner (who took out the accolade in WBBL|02), Renegades teammates Georgia Wareham and Maitlan Brown, Adelaide Strikers batter Tabatha Saville, as well as bowlers Annabel Sutherland from the Melbourne Stars and Belinda Vakarewa from the Sydney Thunder.

== Audience ==
A total of twelve matches were televised on free-to-air in the third season of Women's Big Bash League (WBBL) on Network Ten, including four on the opening weekend. The remaining 47 matches were live streamed on the Cricket Australia or MamaMia website as well as the Cricket Australia Live App for mobile.

Below are the television ratings for every game that was broadcast by Network Ten during the season.

The Super Over of match 42 drew ratings of 296,000 nationally, and 185,000 in the 5 metro cities.

Match No	Teams	Average TV Ratings			
Match No	Teams	National		5 metro cities	
Match No	Teams	Session 1	Session 2	Session 1	Session 2
1	Melbourne Renegades vs Sydney Thunder	226,000	331,000	146,000	241,000
3	Sydney Sixers vs Melbourne Stars	376,000	469,000	249,000	297,000
4	Perth Scorchers vs Brisbane Heat	159,000	251,000	99,000	150,000
6	Sydney Thunder vs Sydney Sixers	335,000	421,000	210,000	275,000
15	Sydney Sixers vs Hobart Hurricanes	186,000	307,000	110,000	182,000
23	Adelaide Strikers vs Brisbane Heat	179,000	275,000	106,000	172,000
34	Adelaide Strikers vs Perth Scorchers	193,000	343,000	113,000	223,000
42	Melbourne Stars vs Melbourne Renegades	107,000	172,000	62,000	97,000
49	Melbourne Stars vs Hobart Hurricanes	143,000	229,000	88,000	149,000
Semi-final 1 (Note: Broadcast on Network Ten’s secondary channel ONE)	Sydney Thunder vs Perth Scorchers	100,000	75,000	63,000	48,000
Semi-final 2	Sydney Sixers vs Adelaide Strikers	68,000	113,000	41,000	73,000
Final	Perth Scorchers vs Sydney Sixers	198,000	313,000	119,000	190,000
