= 2017–18 Melbourne Renegades WBBL season =

Melbourne Renegades
2017–18 season
- Melbourne Renegades 2017–18 cap logo
- Coach: Tim Coyle
- Captain(s): Amy Satterthwaite
- Home ground: Camberwell Sports Ground
- League: WBBL
- Record: 6–8 (6th)
- Finals: DNQ
- Leading Run Scorer: Amy Satterthwaite – 368
- Leading Wicket Taker: Lea Tahuhu – 17
- Player of the Season: Amy Satterthwaite

The 2017–18 Melbourne Renegades Women's season was the third in the team's history. Coached by Tim Coyle, they finished the regular season of WBBL|03 in sixth place. Captain and new recruit Amy Satterthwaite won the league-wide Player of the Tournament award, though the Renegades nevertheless once again failed to qualify for finals. In promising signs for the team's future, all-rounder Sophie Molineux won the WBBL Young Gun Award, for which leg spinner Georgia Wareham and pace bowler Maitlan Brown were also nominated.

== Squad ==
Each WBBL|03 squad featured 15 active players, with an allowance of up to five marquee signings including a maximum of three from overseas. Australian marquees are classed as players who made at least ten limited-overs appearances for the national team in the three years prior to the cut-off date (24 April 2017).

Personnel changes ahead of the season included:

- Tim Coyle was appointed head coach, replacing Lachlan Stevens.
- New Zealand marquee Amy Satterthwaite signed on, having departed the Hobart Hurricanes. Satterthwaite was appointed captain, replacing Rachel Priest (6–10 win–loss record) who moved to the Sydney Thunder.
- England marquee Danni Wyatt did not return for WBBL|03. Sri Lanka marquee Chamari Atapattu filled the vacant overseas player slot.
- Grace Harris departed after one season, returning to the Brisbane Heat.
- Annabel Sutherland moved to the Melbourne Stars.
- Jess Duffin, Emma Inglis and Hayley Jensen signed with the Renegades, exiting the Melbourne Stars. Jensen, a New Zealander, was classed as a local player due to her permanent residence in Australia and a lack of recent international cricket appearances.
- Claire Koski joined the team, following her departure from the Sydney Thunder.

The table below lists the Renegades players and their key stats (including runs scored, batting strike rate, wickets taken, economy rate, catches and stumpings) for the season.

No.	Name	Nat.	Date of birth	Batting style	Bowling style	G	R	SR	W	E	C	S	Notes
Batters
58	Chamari Atapattu	(Sri Lanka)	9 February 1990	Left-handed	Right-arm off spin	14	175	81.77	4	7.81	3	–	Overseas marquee
8	Kris Britt	(Australia)	13 April 1984	Right-handed	Right-arm leg spin	9	68	85.00	–	–	3	–	
27	Jess Duffin	(Australia)	27 June 1989	Right-handed	Right-arm leg spin	10	238	112.26	–	–	8	–	Australian marquee
55	Claire Koski	(Australia)	13 March 1991	Right-handed	Right-arm medium	14	111	113.26	0	13.00	3	–	
	Gaby Lewis	(Ireland)	27 March 2001	Right-handed	Right-arm leg spin	–	–	–	–	–	–	–	Associate rookie
26	Rhiann O'Donnell	(Australia)	14 April 1998	Right-handed	Right-arm medium	–	–	–	–	–	–	–	
All-rounders
23	Sophie Molineux	(Australia)	17 January 1998	Left-handed	Left-arm orthodox	14	318	116.48	6	6.38	9	–	
17	Amy Satterthwaite	(New Zealand)	7 October 1986	Left-handed	Right-arm off spin	14	368	108.55	11	6.57	7	–	Captain, overseas marquee
9	Jenny Taffs	(Australia)	18 June 1995	Right-handed	Left-arm wrist spin	–	–	–	–	–	–	–	
Wicketkeepers
19	Emma Inglis	(Australia)	15 July 1988	Right-handed	–	14	193	112.86	–	–	4	5	
Bowlers
77	Maitlan Brown	(Australia)	5 June 1997	Right-handed	Right-arm medium fast	14	56	103.70	15	6.33	4	–	
44	Hayley Jensen	(New Zealand)	7 October 1992	Right-handed	Right-arm medium fast	13	54	80.59	14	6.17	5	–	
5	Molly Strano	(Australia)	5 October 1992	Right-handed	Right-arm off spin	14	5	38.46	14	6.04	8	–	
6	Lea Tahuhu	(New Zealand)	23 September 1990	Right-handed	Right-arm fast	13	7	43.75	17	6.24	2	–	Overseas marquee
7	Tayla Vlaeminck	(Australia)	27 October 1998	Right-handed	Right-arm fast	–	–	–	–	–	–	–	
32	Georgia Wareham	(Australia)	26 May 1999	Right-handed	Right-arm leg spin	11	7	100.00	10	6.34	0	–	

== Ladder ==
Pos	Team	Pld	W	L	NR	Pts	NRR
1	Sydney Sixers (C)	14	10	4	0	20	0.890
2	Sydney Thunder	14	10	4	0	20	0.684
3	Perth Scorchers (RU)	14	8	6	0	16	0.266
4	Adelaide Strikers	14	8	6	0	16	0.250
5	Brisbane Heat	14	7	7	0	14	0.147
6	Melbourne Renegades	14	6	8	0	12	0.092
7	Melbourne Stars	14	5	9	0	10	−0.634
8	Hobart Hurricanes	14	2	12	0	4	−1.733

- The top four teams qualified for the play-off phase.

== Fixtures ==
=== Regular season ===
Match 1
9 December 2017
13:45
Scorecard

Sydney Thunder; 6/200 (20 overs)	v	Melbourne Renegades; 6/189 (20 overs)
Rachael Haynes 55 (41); Maitlan Brown 1/29 (4 overs)		Jess Duffin 81 (47); Stafanie Taylor 2/30 (4 overs)

Sydney Thunder won by 11 runs
North Sydney Oval No. 2
Umpires: Ryan Nelson and David Shepard
Player of the match: Jess Duffin (Renegades)

- Melbourne Renegades won the toss and elected to field
- Broadcast by Network Ten

With the Renegades requiring 28 runs from the remaining 17 balls, new recruit Jess Duffin was dismissed in controversial fashion by what commentators and players believed to be an illegitimate catch. The momentum of the contest then swung dramatically and the Renegades lost by eleven runs.

Match 11
16 December 2017
14:00
Scorecard

Adelaide Strikers; 6/139 (20 overs)	v	Melbourne Renegades; 8/138 (20 overs)
Tammy Beaumont 45 (44); Hayley Jensen 1/17 (2 overs)		Amy Satterthwaite 56 (40); Tahlia McGrath 2/27 (4 overs)

Adelaide Strikers won by 1 run
Gliderol Stadium, Glenelg
Umpires: Craig Thomas and Luke Uthenwoldt
Player of the match: Tahlia McGrath (Strikers)

- Melbourne Renegades won the toss and elected to field
- Streamed on cricket.com.au

Match 13
17 December 2017
14:00
Scorecard

Melbourne Renegades; 5/160 (20 overs)	v	Adelaide Strikers; 9/151 (20 overs)
Amy Satterthwaite 49 (37); Sophie Devine 2/25 (4 overs)		Suzie Bates 63 (38); Lea Tahuhu 2/20 (4 overs)

Melbourne Renegades won by 9 runs
Gliderol Stadium, Glenelg
Umpires: Craig Thomas and Luke Uthenwoldt
Player of the match: Amy Satterthwaite (Renegades)

- Melbourne Renegades won the toss and elected to bat
- Streamed on cricket.com.au

Match 14
22 December 2017
14:00
Scorecard

Melbourne Renegades; 6/133 (20 overs)	v	Brisbane Heat; 125 (19.5 overs)
Sophie Molineux 40 (32); Delissa Kimmince 2/26 (4 overs)		Beth Mooney 39 (28); Molly Strano 3/16 (4 overs)

Melbourne Renegades won by 8 runs
Camberwell Sports Ground, Melbourne
Umpires: Daryl Brigham and Dale Ireland
Player of the match: Amy Satterthwaite (Renegades)

- Brisbane Heat won the toss and elected to field
- Streamed on cricket.com.au

Match 16
23 December 2017
14:30
Scorecard

Brisbane Heat; 66 (16.1 overs)	v	Melbourne Renegades; 0/67 (10.5 overs)
Deandra Dottin 14 (20); Amy Satterthwaite 2/5 (2 overs)		Sophie Molineux 45* (37)

Melbourne Renegades won by 10 wickets (with 55 balls remaining)
Etihad Stadium, Melbourne
Umpires: Daryl Brigham and Dale Ireland
Player of the match: Sophie Molineux (Renegades)

- Brisbane Heat won the toss and elected to bat
- Streamed on cricket.com.au
- Double header with Match 6 of the Men's BBL
- Brisbane Heat's total of 66 equalled the record for lowest all out WBBL team score

Match 24
2 January 2018
14:00
Scorecard

Sydney Sixers; 7/128 (20 overs)	v	Melbourne Renegades; 92 (19 overs)
Ellyse Perry 64 (56); Hayley Jensen 2/13 (3 overs)		Jess Duffin 35 (42); Dane van Niekerk 4/13 (4 overs)

Sydney Sixers won by 36 runs
Camberwell Sports Ground, Melbourne
Umpires: Dale Ireland and Daryl Brigham
Player of the match: Ellyse Perry (Sixers)

- Melbourne Renegades won the toss and elected to field
- Streamed on cricket.com.au

Match 25
3 January 2018
14:20
Scorecard

Melbourne Renegades; 7/120 (20 overs)	v	Sydney Sixers; 7/120 (20 overs)
Amy Satterthwaite 44 (44); Dane van Niekerk 2/25 (4 overs)		Ellyse Perry 37 (41); Chamari Atapattu 2/6 (2 overs)

Match Tied (Melbourne Renegades won the Super Over)
GMHBA Stadium, Geelong
Umpires: Stephen Brne and Dale Ireland
Player of the match: Amy Satterthwaite (Renegades)

- Melbourne Renegades won the toss and elected to bat
- Streamed on cricket.com.au

In "bizarre" scenes, Sixers batter Sarah Aley attempted to score a game-tying run on the last delivery despite Renegades wicket-keeper Emma Inglis, having received the ball over the stumps from fielder Kris Britt and thus believing the match to be over, already celebrating victory. After deliberation, officiating umpires deemed the ball was not dead and the run would be allowed, thereby forcing a super over which the Renegades nevertheless went on to win.

Match 27
6 January 2018
14:20
Scorecard

Melbourne Renegades; 6/142 (20 overs)	v	Melbourne Stars; 3/145 (19 overs)
Jess Duffin 40 (34); Erin Osborne 2/14 (4 overs)		Georgia Elwiss 59* (51); Lea Tahuhu 1/21 (3 overs)

Melbourne Stars won by 7 wickets (with 6 balls remaining)
Melbourne Cricket Ground
Umpires: Daryl Brigham and Dale Ireland
Player of the match: Georgia Elwiss (Stars)

- Melbourne Renegades won the toss and elected to bat
- Streamed on cricket.com.au

Match 37
14 January 2018
10:00
Scorecard

Hobart Hurricanes; 100 (18.5 overs)	v	Melbourne Renegades; 0/102 (17.2 overs)
Hayley Matthews 40 (40); Maitlan Brown 3/28 (3.5 overs)		Sophie Molineux 53* (39)

Melbourne Renegades won by 10 wickets (with 51 balls remaining)
Blundstone Arena, Hobart
Umpires: Wade Stewart and Muhammad Qureshi
Player of the match: Sophie Molineux (Renegades)

- Melbourne Renegades won the toss and elected to field
- Streamed on cricket.com.au

Match 39
15 January 2018
14:50
Scorecard

Hobart Hurricanes; 9/120 (20 overs)	v	Melbourne Renegades; 6/116 (20 overs)
Veda Krishnamurthy 40 (35); Lea Tahuhu 3/25 (4 overs)		Amy Satterthwaite 65 (58); Brooke Hepburn 3/24 (4 overs)

Hobart Hurricanes won by 4 runs
Blundstone Arena, Hobart
Umpires: G Beechey and Darren Close
Player of the match: Brooke Hepburn (Hurricanes)

- Melbourne Renegades won the toss and elected to field
- Streamed on cricket.com.au

Match 42
20 January 2018
13:45
Scorecard

Melbourne Stars; 6/118 (20 overs)	v	Melbourne Renegades; 6/118 (20 overs)
Alana King 22 (17); Molly Strano 1/17 (3 overs)		Amy Satterthwaite 31* (27); Annabel Sutherland 2/11 (4 overs)

Match Tied (Melbourne Stars won the Super Over)
Melbourne Cricket Ground
Umpires: Stephen Brne and David Shepard
Player of the match: Alana King (Stars)

- Melbourne Stars won the toss and elected to bat
- Broadcast by Network Ten

Chasing 119 for victory, Renegades captain Amy Satterthwaite—who looked to have been run out earlier in the innings and left the field, but was recalled after TV replays showed wicket-keeper Nicole Faltum had dislodged the bails prematurely—hit a six off the final delivery against the bowling of Georgia Elwiss to tie the game. With scores still level after the super over, the Stars were awarded the win on the boundary count back rule.

Match 48
24 January 2018
14:50
Scorecard

Melbourne Renegades; 68 (15.5 overs)	v	Sydney Thunder; 6/69 (16 overs)
Amy Satterthwaite 17 (19); Nicola Carey 3/10 (3.5 overs)		Rachael Haynes 37 (36); Hayley Jensen 3/11 (3 overs)

Sydney Thunder won by 4 wickets (with 24 balls remaining)
Manuka Oval, Canberra
Umpires: Dinusha Bandara and Andrew Crozier
Player of the match: Nicola Carey (Thunder)

- Sydney Thunder won the toss and elected to field
- Streamed on cricket.com.au

Match 51
27 January 2018
14:00
Scorecard

Perth Scorchers; 7/124 (20 overs)	v	Melbourne Renegades; 6/125 (19.2 overs)
Lauren Ebsary 61* (44); Maitlan Brown 2/18 (4 overs)		Sophie Molineux 62 (45); Emma King 2/14 (3 overs)

Melbourne Renegades won by 4 wickets (with 4 balls remaining)
Camberwell Sports Ground, Melbourne
Umpires: Andrew Crozier and Dale Ireland
Player of the match: Sophie Molineux (Renegades)

- Melbourne Renegades won the toss and elected to field
- Streamed on cricket.com.au

Match 54
28 January 2018
14:00
Scorecard

Melbourne Renegades; 9/112 (20 overs)	v	Perth Scorchers; 6/113 (16.1 overs)
Emma Inglis 28 (19); Katherine Brunt 3/11 (4 overs)		Natalie Sciver 39* (33); Georgia Wareham 3/19 (4 overs)

Perth Scorchers won by 4 wickets (with 23 balls remaining)
Camberwell Sports Ground, Melbourne
Umpires: Daryl Brigham and Andrew Crozier
Player of the match: Katherine Brunt (Scorchers)

- Perth Scorchers won the toss and elected to field
- Streamed on cricket.com.au
- Former Australian player Kris Britt made her last WBBL appearance

== Statistics and awards ==
- Most runs: Amy Satterthwaite – 368 (8th in the league)
- Highest score in an innings: Jess Duffin – 81 (47) vs Sydney Thunder, 9 December 2017
- Most wickets: Lea Tahuhu – 17 (equal 4th in the league)
- Best bowling figures in an innings: Hayley Jensen – 3/11 (3 overs) vs Sydney Thunder, 24 January 2018
- Most catches (fielder): Sophie Molineux – 9 (equal 3rd in the league)
- Player of the Match awards:
  - Sophie Molineux, Amy Satterthwaite – 3 each
  - Jess Duffin – 1
- Renegades Player of the Season: Amy Satterthwaite
- WBBL|03 Player of the Tournament: Amy Satterthwaite (1st)
- WBBL|03 Team of the Tournament: Amy Satterthwaite, Lea Tahuhu
- WBBL|03 Young Gun Award: Sophie Molineux (winner), Georgia Wareham (nominated), Maitlan Brown (nominated)
