= Nicola Hancock =

Australian cricketer (born 1995)

Personal information
- Full name: Nicola Maggie Hancock
- Born: 8 November 1995 (age 31); Melbourne, Victoria, Australia
- Batting: Right-handed
- Bowling: Right-arm medium
- Role: All-rounder

Domestic team information
- Years: Team
- 2015/16: Victoria
- 2015/16: Melbourne Renegades
- 2015/16: Northern Districts
- 2016/17–2021/22: Australian Capital Territory
- 2017/18: Hobart Hurricanes
- 2018/19–2019/20: Melbourne Stars
- 2020/21–2025/26: Brisbane Heat
- 2022/23–present: Queensland
- 2024: Sunrisers
- 2026/27–present: Sydney Thunder

Career statistics
Competition	WLA	WT20
Matches	84	123
Runs scored	512	339
Batting average	6.10	2.76
100s/50s	0/0	0/0
Top score	48*	40
Balls bowled	3,255	2,188
Wickets	80	117
Bowling average	33.04	22.91
5 wickets in innings	0	0
10 wickets in match	0	0
Best bowling	3/15	4/20
Catches/stumpings	10/–	9/–
- Source: CricketArchive, 10 March 2021

Nicola Maggie Hancock (born 8 November 1995) is an Australian cricketer who plays as a right-arm medium bowler and right-handed batter. She plays for the Queensland Fire in the Women's National Cricket League and the Brisbane Heat in the Women's Big Bash League. She has previously played for Victoria, Melbourne Renegades, Northern Districts, ACT Meteors, Hobart Hurricanes, Melbourne Stars and Sunrisers. She has played for Australia at underage level and for their second team, the Shooting Stars.

In October 2026, it was announced that Hancock had signed with the Sydney Thunder for the 2026-26 Woman's Big Bag League season.
