= Samantha Bates =

Australian cricketer (born 1992)

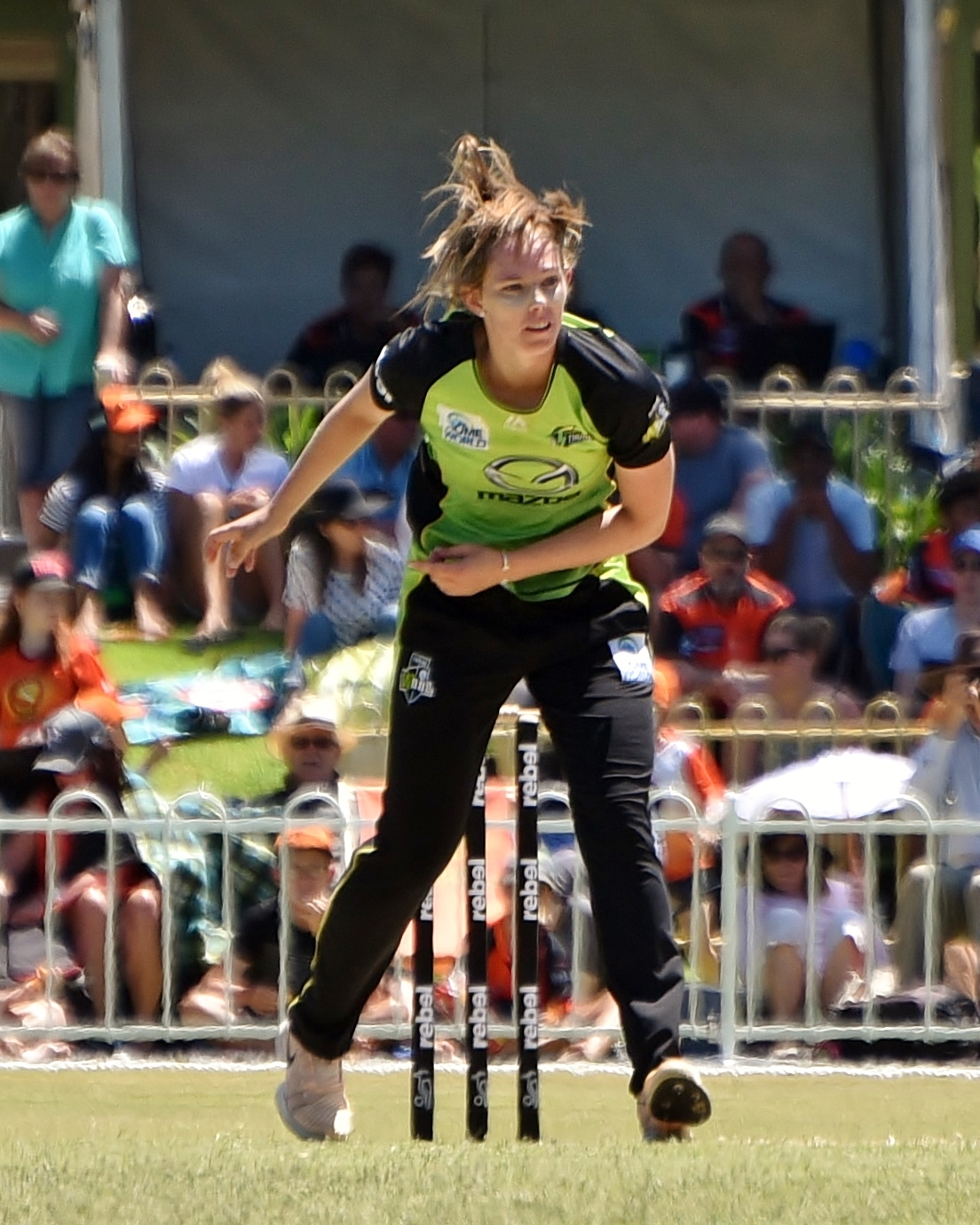
- Bates bowling for Sydney Thunder

Personal information
- Full name: Samantha Lee Bates
- Born: 17 August 1992 (age 34); Newcastle, New South Wales
- Batting: Right-handed
- Bowling: Left-arm orthodox spin
- Role: Bowler

Domestic team information
- Years: Team
- 2009/10–2018/19: ACT Meteors
- 2015/16–present: Sydney Thunder
- 2019/20–2020/21: Tasmanian Tigers
- 2021/22–present: Victoria

Career statistics
Competition	WLA	WT20
Matches	81	153
Runs scored	122	47
Batting average	–	–
100s/50s	0/0	0/0
Top score	13	12*
Balls bowled	4,123	3,110
Wickets	101	126
Bowling average	26.49	25.32
5 wickets in innings	1	0
10 wickets in match	0	0
Best bowling	5/29	3/9
Catches/stumpings	1/–	1/–
- Source: Cricinfo, 4 January 2018

Samantha Lee Bates (born 17 August 1992) is an Australian cricketer who plays as a spin bowler for the Sydney Thunder and Victoria.

Bates grew up in Newcastle and started playing cricket in the local boys' competition at age 10. Originally a fast bowler, she was encouraged to take up spin after requiring a knee reconstruction due to a soccer training accident when she was 16.

The left-armer toured Dubai in March and April 2015 as a member of Cricket Australia's Shooting Stars program, an under-23 development squad. On 6 December, she claimed the Thunder's first-ever wicket in the Women's Big Bash League, dismissing Alyssa Healy for 14 runs. Two weeks later, Bates broke her right wrist in two places while diving for a catch during a six-wicket loss to the Adelaide Strikers at Allan Border Field. She was consequently ruled out for the remainder of the 2015–16 WBBL season, nevertheless the Thunder would go on to win the inaugural championship.

After re-signing with the Thunder in October 2017 for two more seasons, Bates took 16 WBBL|03 wickets at an economy rate of 5.88 and was named in the ACA's All-Star Team of the Year.

In October 2018, Bates was selected for the first official women's Australia A tour, which included three 50-over matches and three Twenty20s against India A in Mumbai.

In May 2019, after a decade with the ACT Meteors, Bates signed with Tasmania for the 2019–20 WNCL season. Two months later, she recommitted to the Sydney Thunder for a fifth and sixth WBBL season.
