= Brooke Hepburn =

Australian cricketer

Personal information
- Full name: Brooke Louise Hepburn
- Born: 19 April 1990 (age 36); Launceston, Tasmania Australia
- Batting: Right-handed
- Bowling: Right-arm medium
- Role: Bowler

Domestic team information
- Years: Team
- 2010/11–2020/21: Tasmania
- 2015: Scorchers
- 2015/16–2020/21: Hobart Hurricanes (squad no. 12)

Career statistics
Competition	WLA	WT20
Matches	60	122
Runs scored	277	129
Batting average	8.65	5.60
100s/50s	0/0	0/0
Top score	38	15
Balls bowled	2,100	2,004
Wickets	47	80
Bowling average	40.80	28.36
5 wickets in innings	1	0
10 wickets in match	0	0
Best bowling	5/39	3/19
Catches/stumpings	14/–	20/–
- Source: , 21 March 2021

Brooke Louise Hepburn (born 19 April 1990) is an Australian former cricketer who played for Tasmanian Tigers and Hobart Hurricanes.

Born in Launceston, Hepburn did not begin playing cricket until she was 19 years old. Just one year later, the Tasmanian Roar gave her a Rookie contract for the 2010–11 season. She has said that "Although I missed out on playing underage cricket for Tassie, I got plenty of competitive bowling practice in the backyard against my older (and very competitive!) sister!"

From May to August 2015, Hepburn played in Ireland for Scorchers in the Women's Super 3s, a competition involving both 50 over and T20 matches.

At the start of the 2016–17 season, Hepburn was appointed vice-captain of Tasmanian Roar. According to Roar coach Julia Price, "Brooke's elevation to vice-captain comes from her 'lead by example' approach to her cricket particularly over the last two years." In October 2016, during the opening round of that season's WNCL, Hepburn top scored for the Roar in the match against Queensland Fire with 38 runs, and then took 5–39 against the South Australian Scorpions to become the first Roar player to achieve a 5-wicket haul.

Hepburn was part of the Hurricanes squad for its inaugural WBBL|01 season (2015–16). A highlight of that season for the Hurricanes was her 2–17 against the Melbourne Stars. She was also a member of the Hurricanes squad for the WBBL|02 season (2016–17). In November 2018, she was named in the Hobart Hurricanes' squad for the 2018–19 Women's Big Bash League season.

On 11 June 2021, it was confirmed that Hepburn had retired from cricket.

Outside of cricket, Hepburn works as a Dietitian for Leap Health and the Tasmanian Institute of Sport.
