= Economy rate =

In cricket, average runs conceded per over bowled

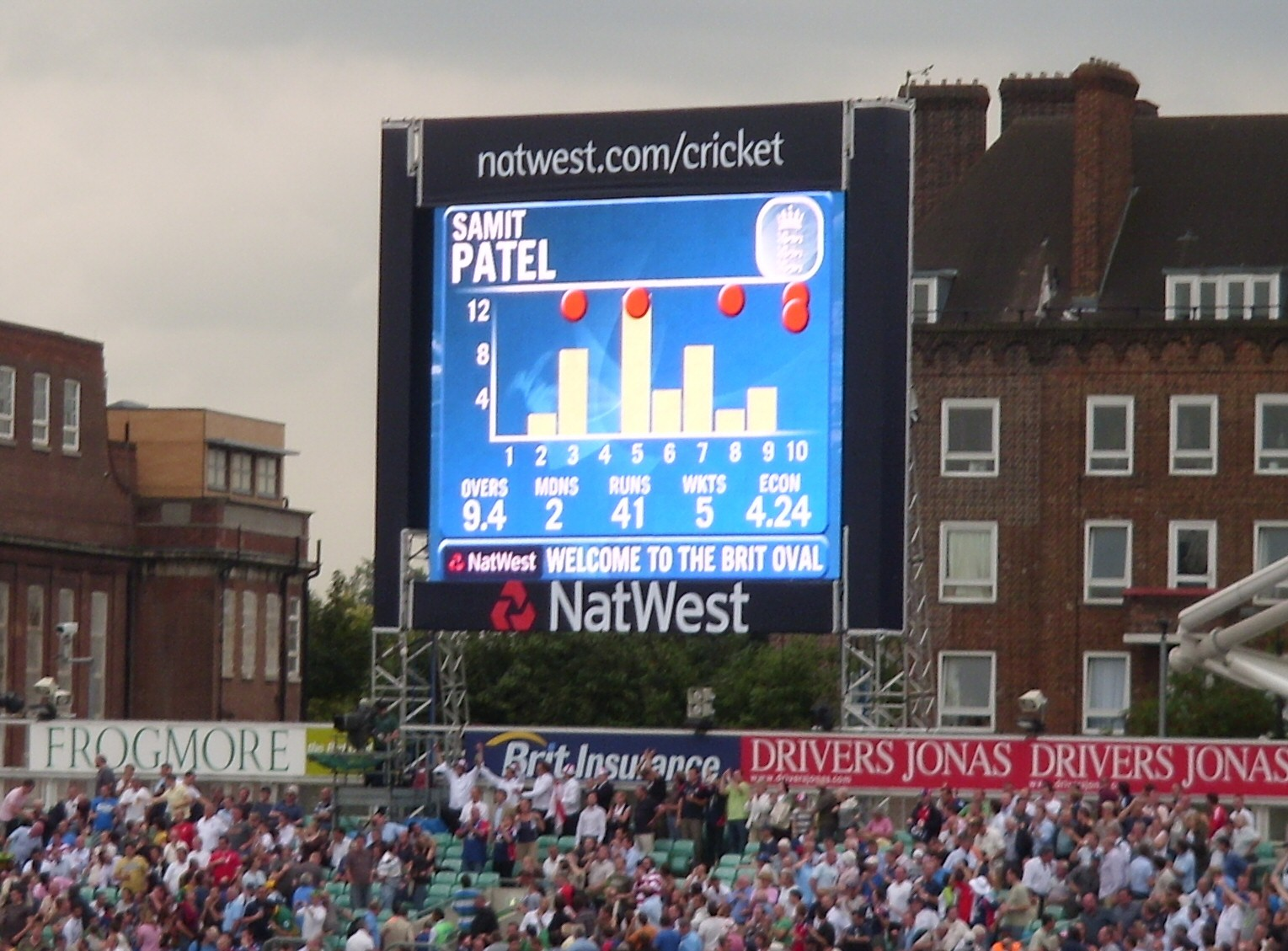
Scoreboard showing bowler Samit Patel's economy rate (4.24, that is, 41 ÷ 9.667).

In cricket, a bowler's economy rate is the average number of runs they have conceded per over bowled. In most circumstances, the lower the economy rate is, the better the bowler is performing. It is one of a number of statistics used to compare bowlers, commonly used alongside bowling average and strike rate to judge the overall performance of a bowler.

== Calculation ==
The calculation is:
$$\text{Economy rate} = \frac{\text{Runs conceded}}{\text{Overs bowled}}$$

Overs are conventionally represented as decimals from 0.1 to 0.6, so must be converted into true fractions before used in the calculation (e.g. "0.3 overs" represents three balls, which is half a six-ball over). For example, a bowler conceding 31 runs from 10.2 overs (i.e. 10 overs and 2 balls), has an economy rate of 31/10.33333 = 3.0 runs per over. If the bowler then bowls again, conceding a further 20 runs from 5.5 overs (i.e. 5 overs and 5 balls), then overall they have conceded 51 runs from 16.1 overs, so their overall economy rate is 51/16.1667 = 3.15 runs per over.

Byes and leg byes are not charged to the bowler's analysis, and so do not harm their economy rate. On the other hand, the bowler is penalised for wides and no-balls, though neither adds a ball to the over.

== Overview ==
The economy rate is typically more important in limited-overs cricket than in the longer Test match format. The shorter forms of the game demand that bowlers (and fielders) restrict the flow of runs from the opposition to limit the total accrued by the point at which the overs run out, giving their own team a better chance of making the winning score. In Tests and other first-class matches, time is more plentiful and the innings usually terminates once all ten wickets are taken rather than after a predetermined number of overs; the priority of the bowling side is then to limit the runs scored per wicket rather than per over. However, there is a balance to be struck - a bowler with a high economy rate in a Test match is generally still aiding the batting side's total, while taking a wicket in limited overs matches usually helps the bowling team by slowing the run rate.

Prior to 8 September 2020, the mean economy rate across all Test matches was 2.75, in one-day internationals 4.70 and in Twenty20 internationals 7.44. Although styles of play have evolved over the years, and bearing in mind that limited-overs cricket is a more modern phenomenon, it is evident that bowlers' economy rates tend to be higher for shorter formats of the game.

== See also ==
- Cricket statistics
