= 2024–25 Sydney Sixers WBBL season =

Sydney Sixers
2024 season
- Sydney Sixers 2022–23 cap logo
- Coach: Charlotte Edwards
- Captain(s): Ellyse Perry
- Home ground: North Sydney Oval
- League: WBBL

The 2024–25 Sydney Sixers Women's season was their 10th season of the Women's Big Bash League. They were coached by Charlotte Edwards and captained by Ellyse Perry. They finished the regular season in 6th place and failed to qualify for the finals.

== Squad ==
The 2024–25 season saw the second WBBL Draft held on 1 September 2024 for overseas players. One international pre-signing per team was allowed to combat availability issues.

- Amelia Kerr was pre-signed by the Sixers, having previously played with the Brisbane Heat, while English players Hollie Armitage and Sophie Ecclestone were also selected in the draft.
- Scottish player Sarah Bryce was signed as an associate rookie.
- Courtney Sippel moved to the Sixers from the Brisbane Heat.
- 15-year-old Caoimhe Bray and Isabella Malgioglio were the other new domestic players added to their squad, earning their first WBBL contracts.
- Elsa Hunter and Frankie Nicklin joined the squad as local replacement players.
- Internationals Suzie Bates and Chloe Tryon both moved to the Hobart Hurricanes.
- English player Linsey Smith moved to the Renegades.
- New Zealander Jess Kerr was not re-signed.
- Domestic players Jade Allen, Emma Hughes, Gabby Sutcliffe, and Hannah Trethewy were also not re-signed.

2024-25 Brisbane Heat Squad:

- Players with international caps are listed in **bold**.

No.	Name	Nat.	Birth date	Batting style	Bowling style	Notes
Batters
57	**Hollie Armitage**	(England)	14 June 1997	Right-handed	Right-arm leg spin	Overseas Draft Pick (Bronze)
4	Mathilda Carmichael	(Australia)	4 April 1994	Right-handed	Right-arm medium	
26	Elsa Hunter	(Australia)	15 February 2005	Right-handed	Right-arm off spin	Local Replacement Player
All-rounders
18	Caoimhe Bray	(Australia)	23 September 2009	Right-handed	Right-arm medium	
88	Maitlan Brown	(Australia)	5 June 1997	Right-handed	Right-arm fast	
29	**Erin Burns**	(Australia)	22 June 1988	Right-handed	Right-arm off spin	
6	**Ashleigh Gardner**	(Australia)	15 April 1997	Right-handed	Right-arm off spin	Australian marquee
48	**Amelia Kerr**	(New Zealand)	13 October 2000	Right-handed	Right-arm leg spin	Overseas Draft Pick (Gold)
8	**Ellyse Perry**	(Australia)	3 November 1990	Right-handed	Right-arm medium	Captain
Wicket-keepers
15	**Sarah Bryce**	(Scotland)	8 January 2000	Right-handed	–	Associate Rookie
77	**Alyssa Healy**	(Australia)	24 March 1990	Right-handed	–	
10	Kate Pelle	(Australia)	17 January 2006	Right-handed	–	
Bowlers
5	**Lauren Cheatle**	(Australia)	6 November 1998	Left-handed	Left-arm fast medium	
19	**Sophie Ecclestone**	(England)	6 May 1999	Right-handed	Left-arm orthodox	Overseas Draft Pick (Platinum)
20	Isabella Malgioglio	(Australia)	22 March 2002	Right-handed	Right-arm leg spin	
16	Frankie Nicklin	(Australia)	20 January 2005	Right-handed	Right-arm off spin	Local Replacement Player
35	Kate Peterson	(Australia)	3 December 2002	Right-handed	Right-arm fast medium	
37	Courtney Sippel	(Australia)	27 April 2001	Left-handed	Right-arm medium	

== Standing ==
Pos	Team	Pld	W	L	T	NR	Pts	NRR	
1	Melbourne Renegades (C)	10	7	3	0	0	14	0.527	Advance to the play-off phase
2	Brisbane Heat (R)	10	7	3	0	0	14	0.384	Advance to the play-off phase
3	Sydney Thunder (3rd)	10	6	3	0	1	13	−0.002	Advance to the play-off phase
4	Hobart Hurricanes (4th)	10	5	5	0	0	10	0.189	Advance to the play-off phase
5	Perth Scorchers	10	4	5	1	0	9	−0.171	
6	Sydney Sixers	10	3	5	1	1	8	−0.477	
7	Adelaide Strikers	10	3	6	0	1	7	−0.357	
8	Melbourne Stars	10	2	7	0	1	5	−0.205	

Source: ESPNcricinfo
(C) Champions; (R) Runners-up
