= 2023–24 Sydney Sixers WBBL season =

Sydney Sixers
2023 season
- Sydney Sixers 2022–23 cap logo
- Coach: Charlotte Edwards
- Captain(s): Ellyse Perry
- Home ground: North Sydney Oval
- League: WBBL

The 2023–24 Sydney Sixers Women's season is the ninth in the team's history. Coached by Charlotte Edwards and captained by Ellyse Perry. the Sixers finished the regular season of WBBL|08 in first position and set a new league record with eleven wins. They consequently qualified for their fifth Final appearance, returning to the knockout phase of the tournament for the first time since WBBL|04. In the championship decider, held at North Sydney Oval, the Sixers were defeated in an upset by the Adelaide Strikers.

== Squad ==
Nicole Bolton (retired), Ange Reakes (retired), Sophie Ecclestone (injury), Stella Campbell (Scorchers) and Angela Genford from last year's squad miss out this year's squad. The 2023–24 season saw a players draft being held for the first time for Women's Big Bash League on 3 September 2023 for overseas players. Each club was able to sign up to three overseas players (not including replacement players).

- Sydney Sixers picked Kiwi pacer Jess Kerr and South African all-rounder Chloe Tryon through draft while New Zealand's star all-rounder Suzie Bates was signed by direct nomination, skipping the draft.
- Linsey Smith of England was picked as replacement player for Sophie Ecclestone.
- Mathilda Carmichael, Gabby Sutcliffe and Kate Pelle are the new domestic players who signed with Sixers.

No.	Name	Nat.	Birth date	Batting style	Bowling style	G	R	SR	W	E	C	S	Notes
Batters
4	Mathilda Carmichael	(Australia)	4 April 1994	Right-handed	Right-arm fast-medium								
All-rounders
11	Suzie Bates	(New Zealand)	16 September 1987	Right-handed	Right-arm medium								Overseas
29	Erin Burns	(Australia)	22 June 1988	Right-handed	Right-arm off spin								
6	Ashleigh Gardner	(Australia)	15 April 1997	Right-handed	Right-arm off spin								Australian marquee
8	Ellyse Perry	(Australia)	3 November 1990	Right-handed	Right-arm fast-medium								Captain, Australian marquee
30	Chloe Tryon	(South Africa)	25 January 1994	Right-handed	Left-arm orthodox spin								Overseas
Wicket-keepers
77	Alyssa Healy	(Australia)	24 March 1990	Right-handed	–								Australian marquee
10	Kate Pelle	(Australia)	17 January 2006	Right-handed	Right-arm fast-medium								
Bowlers
9	Jade Allen	(Australia)	13 November 2003	Right-handed	Right-arm leg spin								
88	Maitlan Brown	(Australia)	5 June 1997	Right-handed	Right-arm fast								
33	Jess Kerr	(New Zealand)	18 January 1998	Right-handed	Right-arm medium								Overseas
5	Lauren Cheatle	(Australia)	6 November 1998	Left-handed	Left-arm fast medium								
50	Linsey Smith	(England)	10 March 1995	Left-handed	Left-arm orthodox spin								Overseas
16	Gabrielle Sutcliffe	(Australia)	11 April 2002	Right-handed	Right-arm medium								
22	Emma Hughes	(Australia)	13 November 2000	Right-handed	Right-arm medium								
35	Kate Peterson	(Australia)	3 December 2002	Right-handed	Right-arm fast medium								
