= 2021–22 Sydney Sixers WBBL season =

Sydney Sixers
2021–22 season
- Sydney Sixers 2021–22 cap logo
- Coach: Ben Sawyer
- Captain(s): Ellyse Perry
- Home ground: N/A
- League: WBBL
- Record: 4–9 (8th)
- Finals: Did not qualify
- Leading Run Scorer: Ellyse Perry – 358
- Leading Wicket Taker: Lauren Cheatle – 10
- Player of the Season: Nicole Bolton

The 2021–22 Sydney Sixers Women's season was the seventh in the team's history. Coached by Ben Sawyer and captained by Ellyse Perry, the Sixers were not scheduled to play any WBBL|07 games in their home state of New South Wales due to ongoing border restrictions related to the COVID-19 pandemic. They finished the regular season on the bottom of the ladder, and recorded more losses than wins, for the first time in the league's initial seven editions. The Sixers also ended the tournament with six consecutive losses, mirroring their equal-longest losing streak which occurred at the beginning of WBBL|01.

== Squad ==
Each 2021–22 squad was made up of 15 active players. Teams could sign up to five 'marquee players', with a maximum of three of those from overseas. Marquees were defined as any overseas player, or a local player who holds a Cricket Australia national contract at the start of the WBBL|07 signing period.

Personnel changes made ahead of the season included:

- South African marquee Marizanne Kapp departed the Sixers, signing with the Perth Scorchers.
- Sarah Aley departed the Sixers, retiring from cricket after WBBL|06.
- South African marquee Dane van Niekerk departed the Sixers, signing with the Adelaide Strikers.
- Indian marquees Shafali Verma and Radha Yadav signed with the Sixers, marking their first appearances in the league.
- Maitlan Brown signed with the Sixers, departing the Melbourne Renegades.
- Nicole Bolton signed with the Sixers, departing the Perth Scorchers.
- Maddy Darke departed the Sixers, signing with the Melbourne Stars.
- Lisa Griffith departed the Sixers, signing with the Perth Scorchers.
- Claire Moore signed as a replacement player after Hayley Silver-Holmes was ruled out of the tournament due to a hip injury.
- On 2 July 2021, the Sixers announced coach Ben Sawyer would not return for WBBL|07, having instead taken on a full-time assistant role for the Australian national women's team. However, on 27 July, it was revealed Cricket Australia agreed to allow Sawyer to coach the Sixers for a seventh and final season.

Squad details during the season included:

- After electing to spend the beginning of the tournament at home for family reasons, Erin Burns could not secure a government exemption to travel from New South Wales to any of the states hosting WBBL|07 matches (including Tasmania, South Australia and Queensland). Burns was consequently ruled out from participating in the entire season.

The table below lists the Sixers players and their key stats (including runs scored, batting strike rate, wickets taken, economy rate, catches and stumpings) for the season.

No.	Name	Nat.	Birth date	Batting style	Bowling style	G	R	SR	W	E	C	S	Notes
Batters
29	Erin Burns	(Australia)	22 June 1988	Right-handed	Right-arm off spin	–	–	–	–	–	–	–	Unavailable for the season
85	Claire Moore	(Australia)	28 October 2003	Right-handed	Right-arm medium	9	1	33.33	–	–	0	–	Replacement player
30	Angela Reakes	(Australia)	27 December 1990	Right-handed	Right-arm leg spin	13	78	82.10	–	–	3	–	
17	Shafali Verma	(India)	28 January 2004	Right-handed	Right-arm off spin	13	191	105.52	–	–	5	–	Overseas marquee
All-rounders
12	Nicole Bolton	(Australia)	17 January 1989	Left-handed	Right-arm off spin	13	247	96.10	8	7.43	6	–	
6	Ashleigh Gardner	(Australia)	15 April 1997	Right-handed	Right-arm off spin	12	197	105.91	7	6.50	8	–	Australian marquee
8	Ellyse Perry	(Australia)	3 November 1990	Right-handed	Right-arm fast	13	358	91.32	5	7.95	2	–	Captain, Australian marquee
Wicket-keepers
77	Alyssa Healy	(Australia)	24 March 1990	Right-handed	–	13	231	115.50	–	–	2	1	Australian marquee
3	Matilda Lugg	(Australia)	11 December 1999	Right-handed	Right-arm medium	–	–	–	–	–	–	–	
Bowlers
9	Jade Allen	(Australia)	13 November 2003	Right-handed	Right-arm leg spin	4	–	–	0	10.50	0	–	
88	Maitlan Brown	(Australia)	5 June 1997	Right-handed	Right-arm fast	13	79	106.75	8	7.13	0	–	
33	Stella Campbell	(Australia)	15 June 2002	Right-handed	Right-arm fast medium	13	15	55.55	6	7.08	2	–	
5	Lauren Cheatle	(Australia)	6 November 1998	Left-handed	Left-arm fast medium	8	34	109.67	10	5.37	4	–	
22	Emma Hughes	(Australia)	13 November 2000	Right-handed	Right-arm medium	7	2	25.00	0	10.20	1	–	
4	Hayley Silver-Holmes	(Australia)	18 August 2003	Right-handed	Right-arm medium	–	–	–	–	–	–	–	Unavailable for the season
21	Radha Yadav	(India)	21 April 2000	Right-handed	Left-arm orthodox spin	12	43	87.75	9	6.81	5	–	Overseas marquee

== Ladder ==
Pos	Team	Pld	W	L	NR	Pts	NRR
1	Perth Scorchers (C)	14	9	3	2	20	0.649
2	Melbourne Renegades (CF)	14	8	4	2	18	−0.149
3	Brisbane Heat (EF)	14	8	5	1	17	0.517
4	Adelaide Strikers (RU)	14	7	6	1	15	0.707
5	Melbourne Stars	14	5	7	2	12	−0.385
6	Hobart Hurricanes	14	5	8	1	11	−0.258
7	Sydney Thunder	14	4	8	2	10	−0.301
8	Sydney Sixers	14	4	9	1	9	−0.704

Source: cricket.com.au, ESPN Cricinfo
- The top 4 teams advanced to the play-off phase

== Fixtures ==
All times are local

Match 1
14 October 2021
19:40 (N)
Scorecard

Melbourne Stars; 1/99 (11 overs)	v	Sydney Sixers; 4/100 (10.2 overs)
Elyse Villani 54* (31)		Alyssa Healy 57 (27); Rhys McKenna 1/9 (1 over)

Sydney Sixers won by 6 wickets (with 4 balls remaining)
Blundstone Arena, Hobart
Umpires: Roberto Howard and David Taylor
Player of the match: Alyssa Healy (Sydney Sixers)

- Sydney Sixers won the toss and elected to field.
- The match was reduced to 11 overs per side due to rain.
- Broadcast by Seven Network and Foxtel

Match 5
17 October 2021
10:15
Scorecard

Hobart Hurricanes; 9/125 (20 overs)	v	Sydney Sixers; 5/129 (19.3 overs)
Richa Ghosh 46 (46); Ellyse Perry 2/9 (2 overs)		Shafali Verma 57 (50); Molly Strano 3/19 (4 overs)

Sydney Sixers won by 5 wickets (with 3 balls remaining)
Blundstone Arena, Hobart
Umpires: Roberto Howard and David Taylor
Player of the match: Shafali Verma (Sydney Sixers)

- Sydney Sixers won the toss and elected to field.
- Broadcast by Seven Network and Foxtel
- Start time swapped with Match 4

Match 9
20 October 2021
16:50 (D/N)
Scorecard

Melbourne Stars; 3/139 (20 overs)	v	Sydney Sixers; 8/109 (20 overs)
Annabel Sutherland 57 (50); Ashleigh Gardner 2/16 (4 overs)		Ellyse Perry 40 (43); Kim Garth 3/17 (4 overs)

Melbourne Stars won by 30 runs
Blundstone Arena, Hobart
Umpires: Roberto Howard and Mattis van Eck
Player of the match: Annabel Sutherland (Melbourne Stars)

- Sydney Sixers won the toss and elected to field.
- Broadcast by Cricket Network and Foxtel

Match 12
23 October 2021
15:40
Scorecard

Sydney Thunder	v	Sydney Sixers

Match abandoned
University of Tasmania Stadium, Launceston
Umpires: Claire Polosak and Muhammad Qureshi

- No toss
- No play was possible due to rain.
- Broadcast by Seven Network and Foxtel

Match 15
24 October 2021
13:40
Scorecard

Sydney Sixers; 4/118 (20 overs)	v	Melbourne Renegades; 3/120 (17 overs)
Ellyse Perry 50* (51); Harmanpreet Kaur 2/17 (4 overs)		Evelyn Jones 38 (30); Radha Yadav 1/12 (2 overs)

Melbourne Renegades won by 7 wickets (with 18 balls remaining)
University of Tasmania Stadium, Launceston
Umpires: Shawn Craig and Mattis van Eck
Player of the match: Harmanpreet Kaur (Melbourne Renegades)

- Melbourne Renegades won the toss and elected to field.
- Broadcast by Seven Network and Foxtel

Match 21
30 October 2021
10:25
Scorecard

Melbourne Renegades; 7/142 (20 overs)	v	Sydney Sixers; 9/130 (20 overs)
Harmanpreet Kaur 43 (32); Ashleigh Gardner 2/8 (2 overs)		Maitlan Brown 31 (20); Ellie Falconer 2/28 (4 overs)

Melbourne Renegades won by 12 runs
Lilac Hill Park, Perth
Umpires: Trent Steenholdt and Jamie Thomas
Player of the match: Jess Duffin (Melbourne Renegades)

- Sydney Sixers won the toss and elected to field.
- Broadcast by Cricket Network and Foxtel

Match 28
31 October 2021
13:50
Scorecard

Sydney Sixers; 3/161 (20 overs)	v	Perth Scorchers; 9/117 (20 overs)
Alyssa Healy 94* (57); Taneale Peschel 2/34 (4 overs)		Beth Mooney 30 (29); Nicole Bolton 3/11 (2 overs)

Sydney Sixers won by 44 runs
Lilac Hill Park, Perth
Umpires: Jarryd Buscall and Trent Steenholdt
Player of the match: Alyssa Healy (Sydney Sixers)

- Sydney Sixers won the toss and elected to bat.
- Broadcast by Cricket Network and Foxtel

Match 29
3 November 2021
10:25
Scorecard

Sydney Sixers; 4/141 (20 overs)	v	Hobart Hurricanes; 7/110 (20 overs)
Ashleigh Gardner 51 (49); Tayla Vlaeminck 1/22 (4 overs)		Rachel Priest 27 (29); Maitlan Brown 2/15 (4 overs)

Sydney Sixers won by 31 runs
WACA Ground, Perth
Umpires: Trent Steenholdt and Dean Trigg
Player of the match: Ashleigh Gardner (Sydney Sixers)

- Hobart Hurricanes won the toss and elected to field.
- Broadcast by Cricket Network and Foxtel

Match 37
9 November 2021
14:05
Scorecard

Sydney Sixers; 2/159 (20 overs)	v	Brisbane Heat; 2/162 (18.3 overs)
Ashleigh Gardner 86* (52); Georgia Prestwidge 1/23 (3 overs)		Grace Harris 54 (39); Radha Yadav 1/33 (4 overs)

Brisbane Heat won by 8 wickets (with 9 balls remaining)
Karen Rolton Oval, Adelaide
Umpires: D Bhatt and David Taylor
Player of the match: Ashleigh Gardner (Sydney Sixers)

- Sydney Sixers won the toss and elected to bat.
- Broadcast by Cricket Network and Foxtel

Match 40
10 November 2021
16:20 (D/N)
Scorecard

Sydney Sixers; 4/142 (20 overs)	v	Adelaide Strikers; 2/148 (18.4 overs)
Shafali Verma 53* (43); Darcie Brown 2/34 (4 overs)		Katie Mack 67* (55); Maitlan Brown 1/30 (4 overs)

Adelaide Strikers won by 8 wickets (with 8 balls remaining)
Karen Rolton Oval, Adelaide
Umpires: Nathan Johnstone and David Taylor
Player of the match: Katie Mack (Adelaide Strikers)

- Sydney Sixers won the toss and elected to bat.
- Broadcast by Cricket Network and Foxtel

Match 44
13 November 2021
18:05 (N)
Scorecard

Sydney Sixers; 7/91 (20 overs)	v	Brisbane Heat; 7/92 (14.1 overs)
Nicole Bolton 25 (31); Jess Jonassen 3/15 (4 overs)		Georgia Redmayne 19 (16); Lauren Cheatle 3/16 (4 overs)

Brisbane Heat won by 3 wickets (with 35 balls remaining)
Harrup Park, Mackay
Umpires: Stephen Dionysius and Eloise Sheridan
Player of the match: Courtney Sippel (Brisbane Heat)

- Brisbane Heat won the toss and elected to field.
- Broadcast by Seven Network and Foxtel
- Melbourne Renegades qualified for finals.

Match 46
14 November 2021
12:40
Scorecard

Sydney Sixers; 6/94 (20 overs)	v	Sydney Thunder; 4/96 (15.2 overs)
Ellyse Perry 40* (40); Hannah Darlington 2/15 (4 overs)		Smriti Mandhana 45 (39); Lauren Cheatle 3/15 (4 overs)

Sydney Thunder won by 6 wickets (with 28 balls remaining)
Harrup Park, Mackay
Umpires: Stephen Dionysius and David Taylor
Player of the match: Issy Wong (Sydney Thunder)

- Sydney Sixers won the toss and elected to bat.
- Broadcast by Seven Network and Foxtel
- Brisbane Heat qualified for finals.

Match 52
20 November 2021
13:10
Scorecard

Sydney Sixers; 82 (19.2 overs)	v	Adelaide Strikers; 2/84 (10.2 overs)
Lauren Cheatle 16 (16); Sarah Coyte 3/12 (3.2 overs)		Dane van Niekerk 33 (22); Maitlan Brown 1/13 (2 overs)

Adelaide Strikers won by 8 wickets (with 58 balls remaining)
Adelaide Oval, Adelaide
Umpires: Harsimran Singh and David Taylor
Player of the match: Darcie Brown (Adelaide Strikers)

- Sydney Sixers won the toss and elected to bat.
- Broadcast by Seven Network and Foxtel
- Sydney Sixers were eliminated from finals contention and Adelaide Strikers qualified for finals.

Match 55
21 November 2021
09:45
Scorecard

Sydney Sixers; 4/128 (20 overs)	v	Perth Scorchers; 2/131 (17.1 overs)
Ellyse Perry 39* (37); Alana King 3/18 (4 overs)		Chloe Piparo 50* (39); Nicole Bolton 1/20 (3 overs)

Perth Scorchers won by 8 wickets (with 17 balls remaining)
Adelaide Oval, Adelaide
Umpires: Dhaval Bhatt and Simon Lightbody
Player of the match: Alana King (Perth Scorchers)

- Sydney Sixers won the toss and elected to bat.
- Broadcast by Seven Network and Foxtel

== Statistics and awards ==
- Most runs: Ellyse Perry – 358 (11th in the league)
- Highest score in an innings: Alyssa Healy – 94* (57) vs Perth Scorchers, 31 October 2021
- Most wickets: Lauren Cheatle – 10 (equal 23rd in the league)
- Best bowling figures in an innings: Nicole Bolton – 3/11 (2 overs) vs Perth Scorchers, 31 October 2021
- Most catches (fielder): Ashleigh Gardner – 8 (equal 5th in the league)
- Player of the Match awards:
  - Ashleigh Gardner, Alyssa Healy – 2 each
  - Shafali Verma – 1
- Sixers Most Valuable Player: Nicole Bolton
