= 2019–20 Sydney Sixers WBBL season =

Sydney Sixers
2019–20 season
- Sydney Sixers 2019–20 cap logo
- Coach: Ben Sawyer
- Captain(s): Ellyse Perry
- Home ground: North Sydney Oval
- League: WBBL
- Record: 7–7 (5th)
- Finals: DNQ
- Leading Run Scorer: Ellyse Perry – 469
- Leading Wicket Taker: Marizanne Kapp – 15
- Player of the Season: Marizanne Kapp

The 2019–20 Sydney Sixers Women's season was the fifth in the team's history. Coached by Ben Sawyer, they finished fifth in WBBL|05. The Sixers entered the tournament as "hot favourites" and proceeded to win six of their first eight matches. However, after captain Ellyse Perry sustained a shoulder injury, they lost five consecutive games to miss out on qualifying for finals for the first time.

== Squad ==
Each 2019–20 squad featured 15 active players, with an allowance of up to five marquee signings including a maximum of three from overseas. Australian marquees are players who held a national women's team contract at the time of signing on for their WBBL|05 team.

South African Marizanne Kapp returned for the Sixers to become one of only two foreigners, along with New Zealander Sophie Devine (member of the Adelaide Strikers), to play in each of the first five WBBL seasons with one team.

On 19 November, the Sixers announced the signing of Englishwoman Hollie Armitage, replacing captain Ellyse Perry who would miss five games due to a shoulder injury. Alyssa Healy stood in as acting captain in the absence of Perry.

The table below lists the Sixers players and their key stats (including runs scored, batting strike rate, wickets taken, economy rate, catches and stumpings) for the season.

No.	Name	Nat.	Birth date	Batting style	Bowling style	G	R	SR	W	E	C	S	Notes
Batters
57	Hollie Armitage	(England)	14 June 1997	Right-handed	Right-arm leg spin	5	54	101.88	–	–	2	–	Overseas marquee (replacement)
29	Erin Burns	(Australia)	22 June 1988	Right-handed	Right-arm off spin	14	175	103.55	8	8.00	7	–	
7	Maddy Darke	(Australia)	30 March 2001	Right-handed	Right-arm off spin	11	21	60.00	–	–	2	–	
8	Ellyse Perry	(Australia)	3 November 1990	Right-handed	Right-arm fast	9	469	112.47	4	5.80	4	–	Captain, Australian marquee
All-rounders
6	Ashleigh Gardner	(Australia)	15 April 1997	Right-handed	Right-arm off spin	14	275	115.54	11	7.41	3	–	Australian marquee
14	Jodie Hicks	(Australia)	19 January 1997	Right-handed	Right-arm medium	8	5	62.50	–	–	3	–	
17	Marizanne Kapp	(South Africa)	4 January 1990	Right-handed	Right-arm fast medium	14	232	118.97	15	6.01	2	–	Overseas marquee
Wicket-keeper
77	Alyssa Healy	(Australia)	24 March 1990	Right-handed	–	14	383	155.69	–	–	6	4	Australian marquee
Bowlers
3	Sarah Aley	(Australia)	3 June 1984	Right-handed	Right-arm medium	14	23	85.18	9	7.41	3	–	
99	Alisha Bates	(Australia)	18 March 2002	Left-handed	Left-arm orthodox	–	–	–	–	–	–	–	
18	Stella Campbell	(Australia)	15 June 2002	Right-handed	Right-arm fast medium	13	2	22.22	5	7.20	2	–	
5	Lauren Cheatle	(Australia)	6 November 1998	Left-handed	Left-arm fast medium	–	–	–	–	–	–	–	
22	Emma Hughes	(Australia)	13 November 2000	Right-handed	Right-arm medium	–	–	–	–	–	–	–	
4	Hayley Silver-Holmes	(Australia)	18 August 2003	Right-handed	Right-arm fast medium	14	3	30.00	6	8.22	0	–	
2	Lauren Smith	(Australia)	6 October 1996	Right-handed	Right-arm off spin	13	91	85.84	4	7.83	3	–	
20	Dane van Niekerk	(South Africa)	14 May 1993	Right-handed	Right-arm leg spin	11	125	105.04	9	6.71	4	–	Overseas marquee

== Ladder ==
Pos	Team	Pld	W	L	NR	Pts	NRR
1	Brisbane Heat (C)	14	10	4	0	20	0.723
2	Adelaide Strikers (RU)	14	10	4	0	20	0.601
3	Perth Scorchers	14	9	5	0	18	0.026
4	Melbourne Renegades	14	8	6	0	16	0.117
5	Sydney Sixers	14	7	7	0	14	−0.076
6	Sydney Thunder	14	5	8	1	11	−0.487
7	Hobart Hurricanes	14	4	9	1	9	−0.197
8	Melbourne Stars	14	2	12	0	4	−0.734

- The four top ranked teams qualified for the play-off phase.

== Fixtures ==
All times are local time

Match 1
18 October 2019
19:40 (D/N)
Scorecard

Sydney Sixers; 6/192 (20 overs)	v	Sydney Thunder; 9/143 (20 overs)
Ellyse Perry 81 (48); Nida Dar 2/44 (4 overs)		Alex Blackwell 56 (38); Sarah Aley 3/28 (4 overs)

Sydney Sixers won by 49 runs
North Sydney Oval, Sydney
Attendance: 1,891
Umpires: Simon Lightbody and Marc Nickl
Player of the match: Ellyse Perry (Sydney Sixers)

- Sydney Sixers won the toss and elected to bat
- Broadcast by Seven Network and Fox Cricket

Match 4
19 October 2019
19:40 (D/N)
Scorecard

Brisbane Heat; 6/165 (20 overs)	v	Sydney Sixers; 73 (14.4 overs)
Beth Mooney 50 (45); Hayley Silver-Holmes 2/35 (4 overs)		Ellyse Perry 27 (30); Amelia Kerr 3/8 (3 overs)

Brisbane Heat won by 92 runs
North Sydney Oval, Sydney
Umpires: Darren Close and Berend du Plessis
Player of the match: Laura Harris (Brisbane Heat)

- Brisbane Heat won the toss and elected to bat
- Broadcast by Seven Network and Fox Cricket

Match 11
26 October 2019
14:00
Scorecard

Melbourne Stars; 9/107 (20 overs)	v	Sydney Sixers; 2/108 (17.1 overs)
Mignon du Preez 44 (47); Marizanne Kapp 3/16 (4 overs)		Ellyse Perry 39* (43); Nicola Hancock 1/19 (4 overs)

Sydney Sixers won by 8 wickets (with 17 balls remaining)
Hurstville Oval, Sydney
Umpires: Berend du Plessis and Marc Nickl
Player of the match: Marizanne Kapp (Sydney Sixers)

- Melbourne Stars won the toss and elected to bat
- Broadcast by Cricket Network
- Marizanne Kapp became the fifth player to take a WBBL hat-trick

Match 18
2 November 2019
12:10
Scorecard

Melbourne Renegades; 8/120 (20 overs)	v	Sydney Sixers; 6/121 (19.5 overs)
Jess Duffin 34* (22); Dane van Niekerk 2/15 (4 overs)		Ellyse Perry 45* (50); Maitlan Brown 2/18 (4 overs)

Sydney Sixers won by 4 wickets (with 1 ball remaining)
WACA Ground, Perth
Umpires: Nathan Johnstone and James Hewitt
Player of the match: Dane van Niekerk (Sydney Sixers)

- Sydney Sixers won the toss and elected to field
- Broadcast by Seven Network and Fox Cricket

Match 21
3 November 2019
11:10
Scorecard

Sydney Sixers; 0/199 (20 overs)	v	Melbourne Stars; 6/154 (20 overs)
Alyssa Healy 106* (53); Erin Osborne 0/31 (4 overs)		Elyse Villani 59 (44); Sarah Aley 2/18 (4 overs)

Sydney Sixers won by 45 runs
WACA Ground, Perth
Umpires: Nathan Johnstone and Trent Steenholdt
Player of the match: Alyssa Healy (Sydney Sixers)

- Sydney Sixers won the toss and elected to bat
- Broadcast by Seven Network and Fox Cricket
- Alyssa Healy and Ellyse Perry set a new record for the highest partnership in a domestic women's T20 (199 runs)

Match 26
9 November 2019
15:00
Scorecard

Sydney Sixers; 7/123 (20 overs)	v	Brisbane Heat; 3/127 (16.5 overs)
Dane van Niekerk 28 (32); Jess Jonassen 2/20 (4 overs)		Jess Jonassen 33 (28); Dane van Niekerk 2/19 (4 overs)

Brisbane Heat won by 7 wickets (with 19 balls remaining)
North Sydney Oval, Sydney
Umpires: Roberto Howard and Berend du Plessis
Player of the match: Jess Jonassen (Brisbane Heat)

- Sydney Sixers won the toss and elected to bat
- Broadcast by Cricket Network

Match 31
13 November 2019
11:00
Scorecard

Sydney Sixers; 2/172 (20 overs)	v	Hobart Hurricanes; 133 (18 overs)
Ellyse Perry 70* (56); Heather Knight 1/30 (4 overs)		Corinne Hall 31 (22); Erin Burns 3/5 (2 overs)

Sydney Sixers won by 39 runs
Invermay Park, Launceston
Attendance: 1,008
Umpires: G Beechey and Simon Burns
Player of the match: Ellyse Perry (Sydney Sixers)

- Hobart Hurricanes won the toss and elected to field
- Broadcast by Cricket Network

Match 33
15 November 2019
19:10 (D/N)
Scorecard

Sydney Sixers; 3/152 (20 overs)	v	Sydney Thunder; 8/112 (20 overs)
Ellyse Perry 81 (70); Samantha Bates 1/20 (4 overs)		Rene Farrell 23 (16); Sarah Aley 2/16 (4 overs)

Sydney Sixers won by 40 runs
Drummoyne Oval, Sydney
Attendance: 1,517
Umpires: Ben Treloar and Marc Nickl
Player of the match: Ellyse Perry (Sydney Sixers)

- Sydney Thunder won the toss and elected to field
- Broadcast by Seven Network and Fox Cricket

Match 36
17 November 2019
14:10
Scorecard

Sydney Sixers; 4/139 (20 overs)	v	Melbourne Renegades; 8/141 (20 overs)
Marizanne Kapp 52* (34); Lea Tahuhu 2/20 (4 overs)		Danielle Wyatt 55 (43); Erin Burns 2/23 (4 overs)

Melbourne Renegades won by 2 wickets (with 0 balls remaining)
Drummoyne Oval, Sydney
Umpires: Keiran Knight and Simon Lightbody
Player of the match: Courtney Webb (Melbourne Renegades)

- Melbourne Renegades won the toss and elected to field
- Broadcast by Seven Network and Fox Cricket

Match 41
20 November 2019
17:30 (D/N)
Scorecard

Sydney Sixers; 7/134 (20 overs)	v	Hobart Hurricanes; 5/139 (18.2 overs)
Marizanne Kapp 55* (40); Belinda Vakarewa 4/19 (4 overs)		Nicola Carey 55* (46); Marizanne Kapp 3/23 (3.2 overs)

Hobart Hurricanes won by 5 wickets (with 10 balls remaining)
North Sydney Oval, Sydney
Umpires: Roberto Howard and Berend du Plessis
Player of the match: Belinda Vakarewa (Hobart Hurricanes)

- Sydney Sixers won the toss and elected to bat
- Broadcast by Cricket Network
- Hobart Hurricanes defeated Sydney Sixers for the first time in WBBL history

Match 43
23 November 2019
10:00
Scorecard

Perth Scorchers; 5/152 (20 overs)	v	Sydney Sixers; 9/100 (20 overs)
Nat Sciver 52 (37); Marizanne Kapp 2/27 (4 overs)		Lauren Smith 36* (35); Kim Garth 2/15 (4 overs)

Perth Scorchers won by 52 runs
Lilac Hill Park, Perth
Attendance: 1,125
Umpires: Ashlee Gibbons and Trent Steenholdt
Player of the match: Nat Sciver (Perth Scorchers)

- Sydney Sixers won the toss and elected to field
- Broadcast by Cricket Network

Match 47
24 November 2019
10:00
Scorecard

Sydney Sixers; 6/164 (20 overs)	v	Perth Scorchers; 2/165 (19.2 overs)
Erin Burns 60* (45); Samantha Betts 2/20 (3 overs)		Meg Lanning 81 (50); Ashleigh Gardner 2/33 (4 overs)

Perth Scorchers won by 8 wickets (with 4 balls remaining)
Lilac Hill Park, Perth
Attendance: 2,435
Umpires: Trent Steenholdt and James Hewitt
Player of the match: Meg Lanning (Perth Scorchers)

- Perth Scorchers won the toss and elected to field
- Broadcast by Cricket Network

Match 51
30 November 2019
14:00
Scorecard

Sydney Sixers; 9/93 (20 overs)	v	Adelaide Strikers; 2/94 (15.1 overs)
Marizanne Kapp 20 (20); Sarah Coyte 3/9 (4 overs)		Sophie Devine 46* (43); Marizanne Kapp 1/8 (3 overs)

Adelaide Strikers won by 8 wickets (with 29 balls remaining)
Hurstville Oval, Sydney
Umpires: Roberto Howard and Marc Nickl
Player of the match: Sarah Coyte (Adelaide Strikers)

- Sydney Sixers won the toss and elected to bat
- Broadcast by Cricket Network
- Perth Scorchers qualified for finals
- Adelaide Strikers defeated Sydney Sixers for the first time in WBBL history

Match 54
1 December 2019
14:00
Scorecard

Sydney Sixers; 7/177 (20 overs)	v	Adelaide Strikers; 7/164 (20 overs)
Alyssa Healy 84 (38); Sarah Coyte 2/27 (4 overs)		Sophie Devine 60 (38); Stella Campbell 2/12 (3 overs)

Sydney Sixers won by 13 runs
Hurstville Oval, Sydney
Umpires: Roberto Howard and Marc Nickl
Player of the match: Alyssa Healy (Sydney Sixers)

- Adelaide Strikers won the toss and elected to field
- Broadcast by Cricket Network

== Statistics and awards ==
- Most runs: Ellyse Perry – 469 (6th in the league)
- Highest score in an innings: Alyssa Healy – 106* (53) vs Melbourne Stars, 3 November
- Most wickets: Marizanne Kapp – 15 (equal 11th in the league)
- Best bowling figures in an innings: Erin Burns – 3/5 (2 overs) vs Hobart Hurricanes, 13 November
- Most catches (fielder): Erin Burns – 7 (equal 9th in the league)
- Player of the Match awards:
  - Ellyse Perry – 3
  - Alyssa Healy – 2
  - Marizanne Kapp, Dane van Niekerk – 1 each
- Sixers Player of the Tournament: Marizanne Kapp
- WBBL|05 Player of the Tournament: Ellyse Perry (equal 4th)
- WBBL|05 Team of the Tournament: Marizanne Kapp, Ellyse Perry
- WBBL|05 Young Gun Award: Stella Campbell (nominated)
