= 2017–18 Sydney Sixers WBBL season =

Sydney Sixers
2017–18 season
- Sydney Sixers 2017–18 cap logo
- Coach: Ben Sawyer
- Captain(s): Ellyse Perry
- Home ground: Sydney Cricket Ground
- League: WBBL
- Record: 10–4 (1st)
- Finals: Champions
- Leading Run Scorer: Ellyse Perry – 552
- Leading Wicket Taker: Sarah Aley – 23
- Player of the Season: Ellyse Perry

The 2017–18 Sydney Sixers Women's season was the third in the team's history. Coached by Ben Sawyer and captained by Ellyse Perry, the Sixers entered WBBL|03 as the defending champions. They finished the regular season on top of the points table for the second season in a row and proceeded to reach a third-consecutive championship decider.

In the final, the Sixers claimed back-to-back titles with a comfortable nine-wicket defeat of the Perth Scorchers at Adelaide Oval, during which Sarah Coyte punctuated an emphatic return to top-level domestic cricket by claiming figures of 4/17 and earning Player of the Match honours.

== Squad ==
Each WBBL|03 squad featured 15 active players, with an allowance of up to five marquee signings including a maximum of three from overseas. Australian marquees were defined as players who made at least ten limited-overs appearances for the national team in the three years prior to the cut-off date (24 April 2017).

Personnel changes for the Sixers ahead of the season included:

- Lisa Sthalekar retired at the conclusion of WBBL|02.
- Rhiannon Dick departed the team and subsequently joined the Adelaide Strikers.
- Erin Burns joined the team after departing the Hobart Hurricanes.
- Lauren Cheatle signed a three-year contract with the team, departing the Sydney Thunder. However, she would miss the entire season due to a back stress fracture injury.

The backend of the tournament was notable for the comeback of medium-pace bowler Sarah Coyte, who had previously played for the Adelaide Strikers until retiring at the conclusion of WBBL|02. With South African marquee players Marizanne Kapp and Dane van Niekerk unavailable for the climax of the competition, coach Ben Sawyer approached Coyte—who had been playing cricket for her local club Penrith occasionally during the summer—about signing for the Sixers as a replacement player. Upon returning to the league, she delivered "exemplary bowling" performances to claim ten wickets at an average of 8.10 in four matches.

England marquee Amy Jones also signed as a replacement player for the Sixers, having performed a similar role for the team during WBBL|02.

The table below lists the Sixers players and their key stats (including runs scored, batting strike rate, wickets taken, economy rate, catches and stumpings) for the season.

No.	Name	Nat.	Birth date	Batting style	Bowling style	G	R	SR	W	E	C	S	Notes
Batters
29	Erin Burns	(Australia)	22 June 1988	Right-handed	Right-arm off spin	16	285	118.25	4	6.14	9	–	
40	Amy Jones	(England)	13 June 1993	Right-handed	–	4	19	76.00	–	–	0	–	Marquee replacement
28	Sara McGlashan	(New Zealand)	28 March 1982	Right-handed	–	16	145	97.97	–	–	3	–	Overseas marquee
33	Angela Reakes	(Australia)	27 December 1990	Right-handed	Right-arm leg spin	15	60	120.00	0	10.00	4	–	
All-rounders
6	Ashleigh Gardner	(Australia)	15 April 1997	Right-handed	Right-arm off spin	14	347	138.80	5	6.89	4	–	
4	Jodie Hicks	(Australia)	19 January 1997	Right-handed	Right-arm medium	5	–	–	–	–	1	–	
13	Clara Iemma	(Australia)	31 October 1998	Left-handed	Right-arm off spin	–	–	–	–	–	–	–	
9	Emily Leys	(Australia)	18 February 1993	Left-handed	Left-arm medium	–	–	–	–	–	–	–	
8	Ellyse Perry	(Australia)	3 November 1990	Right-handed	Right-arm fast	16	552	98.57	5	7.10	3	–	Captain, Australian marquee
20	Dane van Niekerk	(South Africa)	14 May 1993	Right-handed	Right-arm leg spin	12	145	115.07	20	5.57	7	–	Overseas marquee
Wicket-keeper
77	Alyssa Healy	(Australia)	24 March 1990	Right-handed	–	16	421	136.68	–	–	8	6	Australian marquee
Bowlers
3	Sarah Aley	(Australia)	3 June 1984	Right-handed	Right-arm medium	16	29	116.00	23	6.13	0	–	
5	Lauren Cheatle	(Australia)	6 November 1998	Left-handed	Left-arm fast medium	–	–	–	–	–	–	–	
14	Sarah Coyte	(Australia)	30 March 1991	Right-handed	Right-arm medium	4	–	–	10	5.06	1	–	Marquee replacement
34	Kim Garth	(Ireland)	25 April 1996	Right-handed	Right-arm fast medium	14	3	37.50	13	5.86	5	–	Associate rookie
17	Marizanne Kapp	(South Africa)	4 January 1990	Right-handed	Right-arm fast medium	12	50	76.92	12	4.72	3	–	Overseas marquee
74	Carly Leeson	(Australia)	9 November 1998	Right-handed	Right-arm medium	–	–	–	–	–	–	–	
2	Lauren Smith	(Australia)	6 October 1996	Right-handed	Right-arm off spin	16	26	123.80	7	7.76	6	–	

== Ladder ==
Pos	Team	Pld	W	L	NR	Pts	NRR
1	Sydney Sixers (C)	14	10	4	0	20	0.890
2	Sydney Thunder	14	10	4	0	20	0.684
3	Perth Scorchers (RU)	14	8	6	0	16	0.266
4	Adelaide Strikers	14	8	6	0	16	0.250
5	Brisbane Heat	14	7	7	0	14	0.147
6	Melbourne Renegades	14	6	8	0	12	0.092
7	Melbourne Stars	14	5	9	0	10	−0.634
8	Hobart Hurricanes	14	2	12	0	4	−1.733

- The top four teams qualified for the play-off phase.

== Fixtures ==
=== Regular season ===
Match 3
9 December 2017
18:15 (D/N)
Scorecard

Sydney Sixers; 4/242 (20 overs)	v	Melbourne Stars; 7/156 (20 overs)
Ashleigh Gardner 114 (52); Erin Osborne 2/33 (4 overs)		Lizelle Lee 64 (36); Sarah Aley 2/30 (4 overs)

Sydney Sixers won by 86 runs
North Sydney Oval No. 2
Umpires: Marc Nickl and Ben Treloar
Player of the match: Ashleigh Gardner (Sixers)

- Melbourne Stars won the toss and elected to field
- Broadcast by Network Ten

Match 6
10 December 2017
14:00
Scorecard

Sydney Thunder; 6/142 (20 overs)	v	Sydney Sixers; 4/146 (18.4 overs)
Alex Blackwell 58 (52); Ellyse Perry 2/15 (4 overs)		Alyssa Healy 49 (27); Stafanie Taylor 1/27 (3 overs)

Sydney Sixers won by 6 wickets (with 8 balls remaining)
North Sydney Oval No. 2
Umpires: Marc Nickl and Ben Treloar
Player of the match: Alyssa Healy (Sixers)

- Sydney Thunder won the toss and elected to bat
- Broadcast by Network Ten

Match 7
12 December 2017
12:00
Scorecard

Sydney Sixers; 8/122 (20 overs)	v	Perth Scorchers; 1/123 (18.2 overs)
Erin Burns 33 (25); Katherine Brunt, Emma King 2/19 (4 overs)		Elyse Villani 74* (61); Sarah Aley 1/22 (4 overs)

Perth Scorchers won by 9 wickets (with 10 balls remaining)
North Dalton Park, Wollongong
Umpires: Ryan Nelson and Marc Nickl
Player of the match: Elyse Villani (Scorchers)

- Perth Scorchers won the toss and elected to field
- Streamed on cricket.com.au

Match 12
17 December 2017
14:00
Scorecard

Sydney Sixers; 8/152 (20 overs)	v	Hobart Hurricanes; 8/119 (20 overs)
Ellyse Perry 65 (49); Hayley Matthews 2/29 (4 overs)		Veronica Pyke 35* (26); Dane van Niekerk 4/20 (4 overs)

Sydney Sixers won by 33 runs
Blundstone Arena, Hobart
Umpires: Muhammad Qureshi and Harvey Wolff
Player of the match: Dane van Niekerk (Sixers)

- Sydney Sixers won the toss and elected to bat
- Streamed on cricket.com.au
- Dane van Niekerk became the fourth player to take a hat-trick in the WBBL

Match 15
23 December 2017
12:20
Scorecard

Hobart Hurricanes; 98 (19.4 overs)	v	Sydney Sixers; 1/99 (13.5 overs)
Veda Krishnamurthy 16 (17); Dane van Niekerk 2/18 (4 overs)		Erin Burns 48* (38); Nicola Hancock 1/14 (2 overs)

Sydney Sixers won by 9 wickets (with 37 balls remaining)
Sydney Cricket Ground, Sydney
Umpires: Ryan Nelson and Claire Polosak
Player of the match: Marizanne Kapp (Sixers)

- Hobart Hurricanes won the toss and elected to bat
- Broadcast by Network Ten
- Double header with Match 5 of the Men's BBL

Match 20
30 December 2017
13:00
Scorecard

Sydney Sixers; 138 (19.5 overs)	v	Perth Scorchers; 4/139 (18.5 overs)
Ellyse Perry 45 (47); Nicole Bolton 2/15 (3 overs)		Elyse Villani 63 (43); Dane van Niekerk 2/24 (4 overs)

Perth Scorchers won by 6 wickets (with 7 balls remaining)
Lilac Hill, Perth
Umpires: John Taylor and Trent Steenholdt
Player of the match: Nicole Bolton (Scorchers)

- Sydney Sixers won the toss and elected to bat
- Streamed on cricket.com.au

Match 24
2 January 2018
14:00
Scorecard

Sydney Sixers; 7/128 (20 overs)	v	Melbourne Renegades; 92 (19 overs)
Ellyse Perry 64 (56); Hayley Jensen 2/13 (3 overs)		Jess Duffin 35 (42); Dane van Niekerk 4/13 (4 overs)

Sydney Sixers won by 36 runs
Camberwell Sports Ground, Melbourne
Umpires: Dale Ireland and Daryl Brigham
Player of the match: Ellyse Perry (Sixers)

- Melbourne Renegades won the toss and elected to field
- Streamed on cricket.com.au

Match 25
3 January 2018
14:20
Scorecard

Melbourne Renegades; 7/120 (20 overs)	v	Sydney Sixers; 7/120 (20 overs)
Amy Satterthwaite 44 (44); Dane van Niekerk 2/25 (4 overs)		Ellyse Perry 37 (41); Chamari Atapattu 2/6 (2 overs)

Match Tied (Melbourne Renegades won the Super Over)
GMHBA Stadium, Geelong
Umpires: Stephen Brne and Dale Ireland
Player of the match: Amy Satterthwaite (Renegades)

- Melbourne Renegades won the toss and elected to bat
- Streamed on cricket.com.au

Match 35
13 January 2018
14:30
Scorecard

Sydney Sixers; 113 (20 overs)	v	Sydney Thunder; 6/114 (19 overs)
Ellyse Perry 25 (25); Samantha Bates 3/21 (4 overs)		Naomi Stalenberg 48 (41); Sarah Aley 3/11 (4 overs)

Sydney Thunder won by 4 wickets (with 6 balls remaining)
Sydney Cricket Ground
Umpires: Anthony Hobson and G Stubbings
Player of the match: Naomi Stalenberg (Thunder)

- Sydney Sixers won the toss and elected to bat
- Streamed on cricket.com.au

Match 40
18 January 2018
14:30
Scorecard

Sydney Sixers; 5/160 (20 overs)	v	Brisbane Heat; 151 (20 overs)
Alyssa Healy 70 (43); Jemma Barsby 2/19 (3 overs)		Beth Mooney 60 (42); Sarah Aley 3/31 (4 overs)

Sydney Sixers won by 9 runs
Sydney Cricket Ground
Umpires: Anthony Hobson and Marc Nickl
Player of the match: Dane van Niekerk (Sixers)

- Sydney Sixers won the toss and elected to bat
- Streamed on cricket.com.au

Match 41
19 January 2018
14:00
Scorecard

Sydney Sixers; 7/144 (20 overs)	v	Brisbane Heat; 4/126 (20 overs)
Erin Burns 54* (39); Delissa Kimmince 3/23 (4 overs)		Jess Jonassen 55* (38); Lauren Smith 1/13 (3 overs)

Sydney Sixers won by 18 runs
Hurstville Oval, Sydney
Umpires: Anthony Hobson and T Penman
Player of the match: Erin Burns (Sixers)

- Sydney Sixers won the toss and elected to bat
- Streamed on cricket.com.au

Match 46
21 January 2018
14:00
Scorecard

Melbourne Stars; 7/106 (20 overs)	v	Sydney Sixers; 5/107 (18 overs)
Erin Osborne 39 (43); Marizanne Kapp 2/13 (4 overs)		Ellyse Perry 39* (45); Annabel Sutherland 1/13 (3 overs)

Sydney Sixers won by 5 wickets (with 12 balls remaining)
Casey Fields No. 4, Melbourne
Umpires: Stephen Brne and Dale Ireland
Player of the match: Ellyse Perry (Sixers)

- Melbourne Stars won the toss and elected to bat
- Streamed on cricket.com.au

Match 50
27 January 2018
14:00
Scorecard

Adelaide Strikers; 4/149 (20 overs)	v	Sydney Sixers; 3/150 (19.2 overs)
Sophie Devine 70 (45); Sarah Coyte 2/14 (4 overs)		Alyssa Healy 106 (66); Megan Schutt 1/26 (4 overs)

Sydney Sixers won by 7 wickets (with 4 balls remaining)
Hurstville Oval, Sydney
Umpires: Anthony Hobson and T Penman
Player of the match: Alyssa Healy (Sixers)

- Adelaide Strikers won the toss and elected to bat
- Streamed on cricket.com.au

Match 55
28 January 2018
14:00
Scorecard

Adelaide Strikers; 9/111 (20 overs)	v	Sydney Sixers; 2/112 (18.1 overs)
Tammy Beaumont 28 (31); Sarah Coyte 3/18 (4 overs)		Alyssa Healy 63 (52); Alex Price 1/16 (2 overs)

Sydney Sixers won by 7 wickets (with 11 balls remaining)
Hurstville Oval, Sydney
Umpires: T Penman and G Stubbings
Player of the match: Sarah Coyte (Sixers)

- Adelaide Strikers won the toss and elected to bat
- Streamed on cricket.com.au

=== Knockout phase ===
Semi-final 2
2 February 2018
14:40
Scorecard

Sydney Sixers; 5/138 (20 overs)	v	Adelaide Strikers; 9/121 (20 overs)
Ashleigh Gardner 72 (45); Sophie Devine 2/21 (4 overs)		Tammy Beaumont 50 (46); Sarah Aley 4/18 (4 overs)

Sydney Sixers won by 17 runs
Adelaide Oval, Adelaide
Umpires: Michael Graham-Smith and John Ward
Player of the match: Sarah Aley (Sixers)

- Sydney Sixers won the toss and elected to bat
- Played as a double header with BBL semi-final 2
- Broadcast by Network Ten

Final
4 February 2018
11:50
Scorecard

Perth Scorchers; 99 (20 overs)	v	Sydney Sixers; 1/100 (15 overs)
Piepa Cleary 18* (14); Sarah Coyte 4/17 (3 overs)		Alyssa Healy 41 (32); Emma King 1/26

Sydney Sixers won by 9 wickets (with 30 balls remaining)
Adelaide Oval, Adelaide
Umpires: Greg Davidson and John Ward
Player of the match: Sarah Coyte (Sixers)

- Perth Scorchers won the toss and elected to bat
- Sydney Sixers won their second WBBL title
- Played as a double header with BBL final
- Broadcast by Network Ten

== Statistics and awards ==
- Most runs: Ellyse Perry – 552 (1st in the league)
- Highest score in an innings: Ashleigh Gardner – 114 (52) vs Melbourne Stars, 9 December 2017
- Most wickets: Sarah Aley – 23 (equal 1st in the league)
- Best bowling figures in an innings: Dane van Niekerk – 4/13 (4 overs) vs Melbourne Renegades, 2 January 2018
- Most catches (fielder): Erin Burns – 9 (equal 3rd in the league)
- Player of the Match awards:
  - Sarah Coyte, Alyssa Healy, Ellyse Perry, Dane van Niekerk – 2 each
  - Sarah Aley, Erin Burns, Marizanne Kapp – 1 each
- Sixers Player of the Tournament: Ellyse Perry
- WBBL|03 Player of the Tournament: Ellyse Perry (3rd)
- WBBL|03 Team of the Tournament: Sarah Aley, Ellyse Perry, Dane van Niekerk
- WBBL|03 Young Gun Award: Ashleigh Gardner (nominated)
