= Kate Pelle =

Australian cricketer

Personal information
- Full name: Kate Maree Pelle
- Born: 17 January 2006 (age 20); Penrith, New South Wales, Australia
- Batting: Right-handed
- Bowling: Right-arm medium
- Role: Wicket-keeper

Domestic team information
- Years: Team
- 2023/24–present: Sydney Sixers
- 2023/24–present: New South Wales

Career statistics
| Competition | WLA | WT20 |
|---|---|---|
| Matches | 1 | 18 |
| Runs scored | 2 | 121 |
| Batting average | 2.00 | 5.00 |
| 100s/50s | 0/0 | 0/1 |
| Top score | 2 | 56 |
| Catches/stumpings | 4/0 | 4/0 |
- Source: CricketArchive, 26 October 2023

Kate Maree Pelle (born 17 January 2006) is an Australian cricketer who currently plays for New South Wales in the Women's National Cricket League (WNCL) and Sydney Sixers in the Women's Big Bash League (WBBL). She plays as a wicket-keeper and right-handed batter.

== Early life ==
Pelle was born on 17 January 2006 in Penrith, New South Wales.

== Domestic career ==
In 2022, Pelle was part of the title-winning NSW Metro side at the Under-19 National Championships.

In October 2023, it was announced that Pelle had signed for Sydney Sixers for the 2023–24 Women's Big Bash League season. She made her debut in the side's first match of the tournament, against Melbourne Stars. In December 2023, she was named in her first New South Wales squad, and made her debut that month against Victoria in the Women's National Cricket League.

== International career ==
In December 2022, Pelle was named in the Australia Under-19 squad for the 2023 ICC Under-19 Women's T20 World Cup. She was ever-present for the side at the tournament, scoring 134 runs at an average of 26.80 in her six matches. She scored one half-century, 51 from 36 deliveries in a Player of the Match performance against the United Arab Emirates.
