= Isabella Malgioglio =

Australian cricketer

Personal information
- Full name: Isabella Malgioglio
- Batting: Right-handed
- Bowling: Right-arm leg break
- Role: Bowler

Domestic team information
- Years: Team
- 2022/23–present: New South Wales

Career statistics
Competition	WLA	WT20
Matches	2	4
Runs scored	3	1
Batting average	3.00	-
100s/50s	0/0	0/0
Top score	3	1*
Balls bowled	102	60
Wickets	3	2
Bowling average	37.00	35.00
5 wickets in innings	0	0
10 wickets in match	0	0
Best bowling	2/58	1/21
Catches/stumpings	0/–	0/-
- Source: CricketArchive, 2 March 2023

Isabella Malgioglio is an Australian cricketer who currently plays for New South Wales in the Women's National Cricket League (WNCL). She plays as a right-arm leg break bowler.

== Domestic career ==
Malgioglio plays grade cricket for Parramatta District Cricket Club.

In February 2023, Malgioglio was named in a New South Wales squad for the first time. She made her debut for the side on 10 February 2022, against Australian Capital Territory, where she took 2/58 from her 10 overs. She played one further match for the side that season, taking one more wicket.
