= Jade Allen =

Australian cricketer

Personal information
- Born: 13 November 2003 (age 22)
- Batting: Right-handed
- Bowling: Right-arm leg break
- Role: Bowler

Domestic team information
- Years: Team
- 2021/22–present: Sydney Sixers
- 2021/22–present: New South Wales

Career statistics
Competition	WLA	WT20
Matches	15	11
Runs scored	34	3
Batting average	–	–
100s/50s	0/0	0/0
Top score	11	3*
Balls bowled	396	24
Wickets	7	1
Bowling average	55.57	34.00
5 wickets in innings	0	0
10 wickets in match	–	0
Best bowling	2/40	1/13
Catches/stumpings	0/–	1/–
- Source: ESPNcricinfo, 20 October 2021

Jade Allen is an Australian cricketer who plays as a right-arm leg break bowler and right-handed batter for New South Wales Breakers in the Women's National Cricket League (WNCL) and Sydney Sixers in the Women's Big Bash League (WBBL). She made her professional debut during the 2021–22 WBBL for the Sixers against Melbourne Stars, but did not bat or bowl.

== International career ==
In December 2022, Allen was selected in the Australia Under-19 squad for the 2023 ICC Under-19 Women's T20 World Cup.
