= Mathilda Carmichael =

Australian cricketer (born 1994)

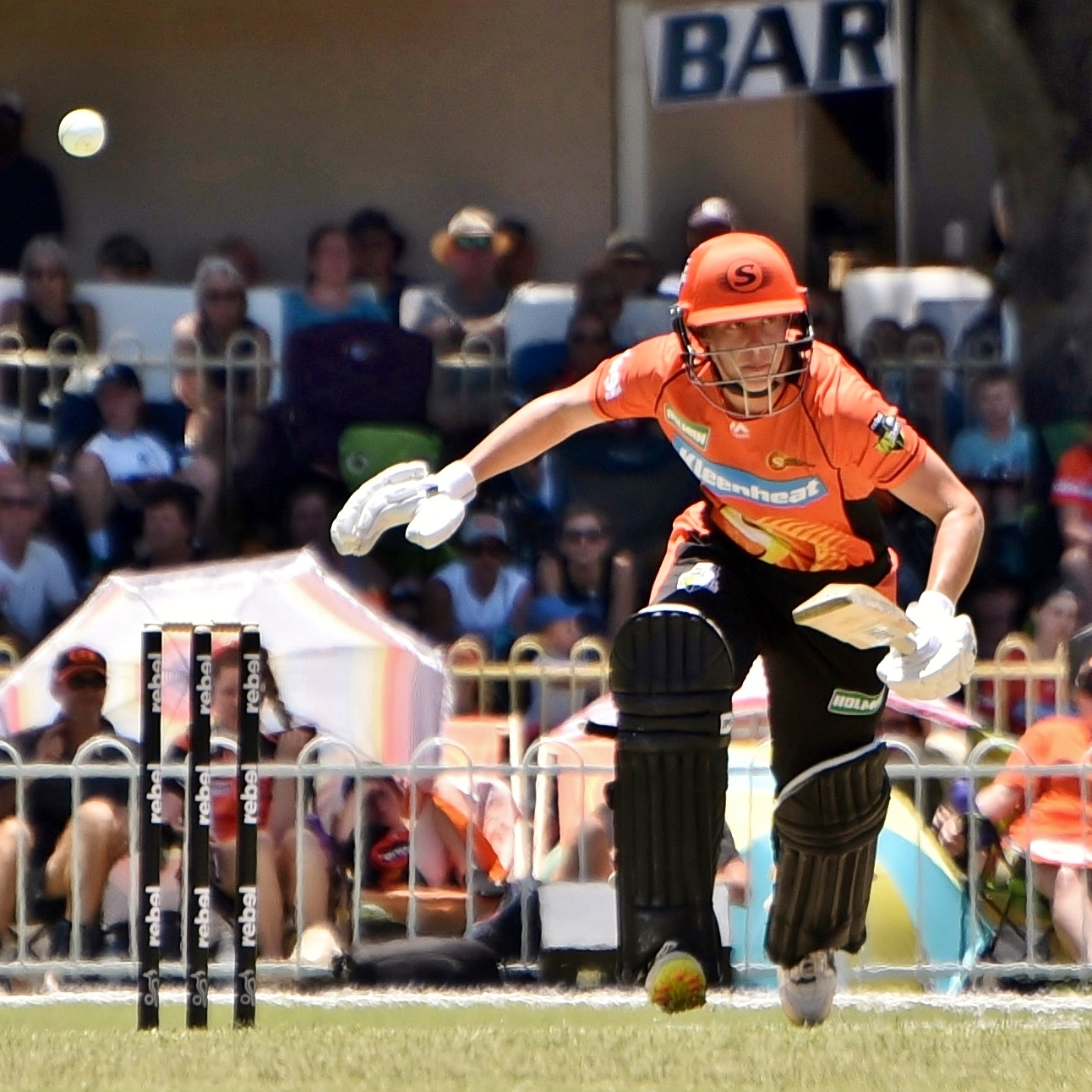
- Carmichael during WBBL|04.

Personal information
- Full name: Mathilda Grace Carmichael
- Born: 4 April 1994 (age 32); St Leonards, New South Wales, Australia
- Batting: Right-handed
- Bowling: Right-arm medium
- Role: Batter

Domestic team information
- Years: Team
- 2016/17–present: Western Australia
- 2016/17–2022/23: Perth Scorchers
- 2023/24–present: Sydney Sixers

Career statistics
Competition	WLA	WT20
Matches	67	59
Runs scored	1,568	452
Batting average	29.07	14.44
100s/50s	1/10	0/0
Top score	104	41
Balls bowled	66	–
Wickets	1	–
Bowling average	63.00	–
5 wickets in innings	0	–
10 wickets in match	0	–
Best bowling	1/3	–
Catches/stumpings	8/–	5/–
- Source: CricketArchive, 27 March 2021

Mathilda Grace Carmichael (born 4 April 1994) is an Australian cricketer who plays as a right-handed batter for Western Australia in the Women's National Cricket League (WNCL) and Sydney Sixers in the Women's Big Bash League (WBBL). Originally from Sydney, she was previously a member of the Hockeyroos field hockey squad. After missing out on selection for the 2016 Summer Olympics, she took up top level domestic women's cricket, but also continued playing hockey.
