= Ben Sawyer =

Australian cricket coach

Personal information
- Born: 1978/79
- Role: Coach

Head coaching information
- Years: Team
- 2015–2021: Sydney Sixers
- 2021–2024: Birmingham Phoenix
- 2022–: New Zealand women
- 2023: Royal Challengers Bangalore

Ben Sawyer (born 1978/79) is an Australian cricket coach, who is the current head coach of the New Zealand women's national cricket team. He has previous been head coach of Birmingham Phoenix women's team in The Hundred, Royal Challengers Bangalore in the Women's Premier League and Sydney Sixers in the Women's Big Bash League. Sawyer has also worked as assistant coach of Australia women, and a coach of New South Wales Breakers.

== Career ==
Sawyer has been the head coach of Sydney Sixers in the Women's Big Bash League. Under his leadership, the Sixers won two WBBL competitions in 2016–17 and 2017–18, and were losing finalists in the 2015–16 and 2018–19 WBBL seasons. He had the highest win percentage of any women's Twenty20 coach.

Sawyer has also worked as an assistant coach for the Australia women's under-19 team, and for New South Wales Breakers as a fast bowling coach. Prior to the 2018 ICC Women's World Twenty20, Sawyer was appointed an assistant coach of the Australia women's national cricket team, where he focused on fast bowling. He replaced Ashley Noffke in the role. Australian cricketer Ellyse Perry credited Sawyer as an important figure in helping Australia win the 2019 Women's Ashes. Sawyer's contract was later extended until the 2021 Women's Cricket World Cup. During his tenure as assistant coach, Australia won two ICC Women's T20 World Cups and a Women's Ashes series in England.

In 2019, Sawyer was announced as the head coach of The Hundred women's team Birmingham Phoenix. The 2020 edition of The Hundred was cancelled due to the COVID-19 pandemic, and so Sawyer took up the role in 2021. In 2020, Sawyer became a full-time coach of the New South Wales Breakers. He continued with his part-time Australia coaching role, and as coach of the Sydney Sixers. In July 2021, Sawyer was appointed Australia women's first full-time pace bowling coach. As a result, he left his role at NSW Breakers. Initially, Sawyer also announced his resignation from Sydney Sixers, but later agreed to coach them for the 2021–22 Women's Big Bash League, as the schedule for the WBBL did not conflict with any Australia women's international matches. After the season, he was replaced by Charlotte Edwards as Sydney Sixers head coach.

In June 2022, Sawyer was appointed head coach of the New Zealand women's national cricket team ahead of the 2022 Commonwealth Games. In February 2023, he was named the head coach of Royal Challengers Bangalore in the Women's Premier League. He was replaced by Luke Williams for the 2024 WPL season. Following the 2024 The Hundred season, his contract with Birmingham Phoenix was not renewed, and he was later replaced by Alistair Maiden.

In December 2024, Sawyer's contract with New Zealand was renewed for two years.
