= Emma Hughes =

Australian cricketer (born 2000)

Personal information
- Full name: Emma Leigh Hughes
- Born: 13 November 2000 (age 25)
- Batting: Right-handed
- Bowling: Right-arm medium
- Role: Bowler

Domestic team information
- Years: Team
- 2019/20–present: Sydney Sixers
- 2020/21–2022/23: New South Wales

Career statistics
Competition	WLA	WT20
Matches	1	9
Runs scored	-	4
Batting average	–	–
100s/50s	-/-	0/0
Top score	-	2*
Balls bowled	54	22
Wickets	1	1
Bowling average	41.00	29.00
5 wickets in innings	0	0
10 wickets in match	0	0
Best bowling	1/41	1/12
Catches/stumpings	1/–	1/–
- Source: CricketArchive, 16 March 2021

Emma Leigh Hughes (born 13 November 2000) is an Australian cricketer who plays as a right-arm medium bowler and right-handed batter. She plays for the Sydney Sixers in the Women's Big Bash League (WBBL). She played in two matches for the team in the 2020–21 Women's Big Bash League season. She also joined the New South Wales Breakers ahead of the 2020–21 Women's National Cricket League season.
