= Stella Campbell =

Australian cricketer

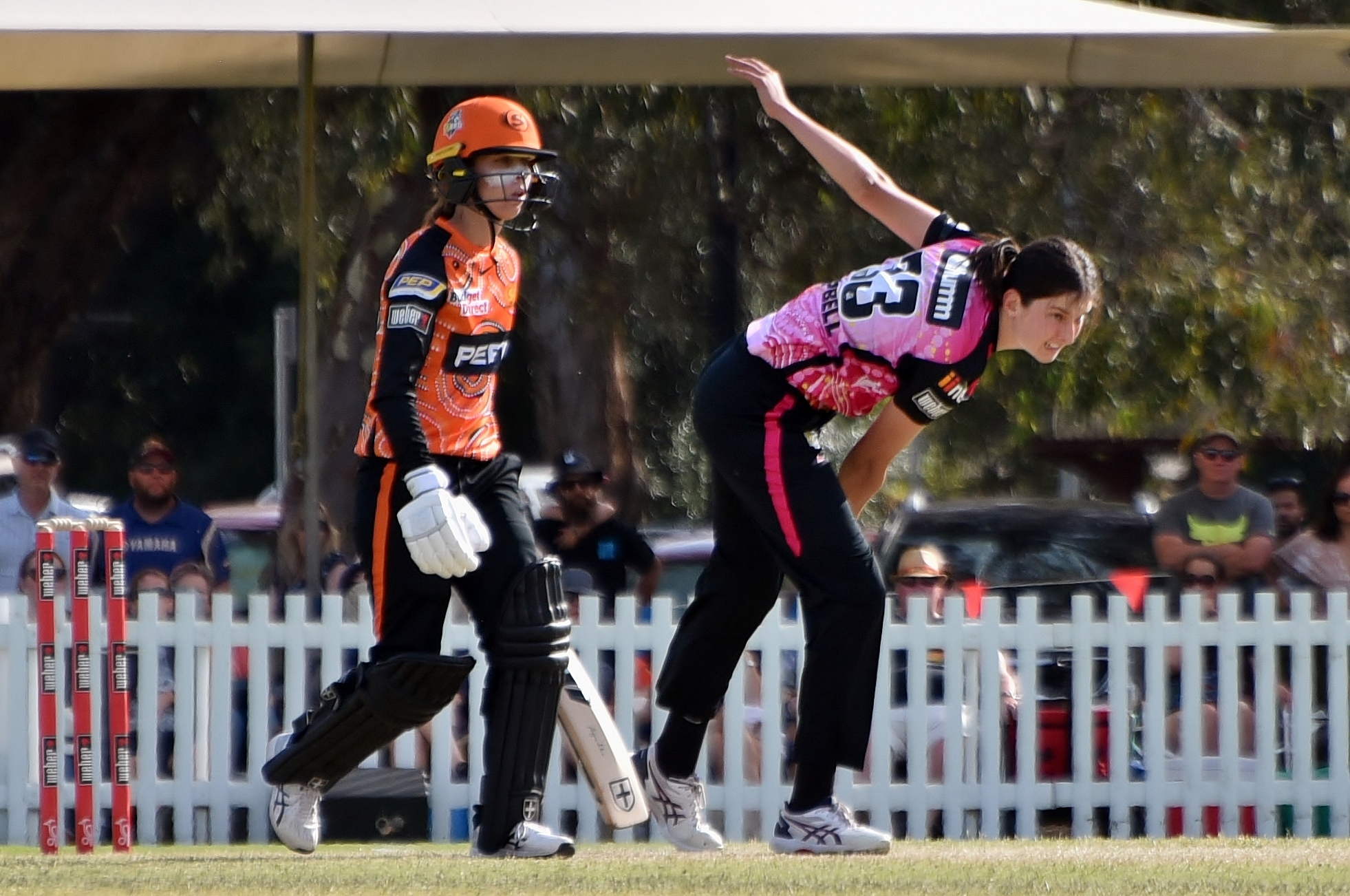
- Campbell bowling for Sydney Sixers during WBBL|07

Personal information
- Full name: Stella Rae Campbell
- Born: 15 June 2002 (age 24)
- Batting: Right-handed
- Bowling: Right-arm medium
- Role: Bowler

International information
- National side: Australia
- Only Test (cap 178): 30 September 2021 v India
- Only ODI (cap 146): 26 September 2021 v India

Domestic team information
- Years: Team
- 2019/20–2022/23: Sydney Sixers
- 2019/20–present: New South Wales
- 2023/24–present: Perth Scorchers

Career statistics
Competition	WTest	WODI	WLA	WT20
Matches	1	1	30	56
Runs scored	0	0	30	25
Batting average	–	–	–	9.50
100s/50s	0/0	0/0	0/0	0/0
Top score	0*	0*	7*	12
Balls bowled	108	54	1,052	642
Wickets	2	1	29	24
Bowling average	33.00	41.00	33.03	31.46
5 wickets in innings	0	0	1	0
10 wickets in match	0	0	0	0
Best bowling	2/47	1/41	7/25	3/32
Catches/stumpings	–/–	–/–	3/–	4/–
- Source: CricketArchive, 12 January 2022

Stella Rae Campbell (born 15 June 2002) is an Australian cricketer who plays as a right-arm medium bowler and right-handed batter for the New South Wales Breakers in the Women's National Cricket League (WNCL) and the Perth Scorchers in the Women's Big Bash League (WBBL). Campbell made her debut in the 2019–20 Women's Big Bash League season, for Sydney Sixers, playing in thirteen matches. In September 2020, she re-signed for the Sydney Sixers for the 2020 tournament.

In August 2021, Campbell was named in Australia's squad for their series against India, which included a one-off day/night Test match as part of the tour. Campbell made her Women's One Day International (WODI) debut on 26 September 2021, for Australia against India. Campbell made her Test debut on 30 September 2021, also for Australia against India.

In January 2022, Campbell was named in Australia's A squad for their series against England A, with the matches being played alongside the Women's Ashes. Later the same month, Campbell was added to Australia's main squad ahead of the one-off Ashes Test match, following an injury to Tayla Vlaeminck.
