= Maitlan Brown =

Australian cricketer and industrial designer

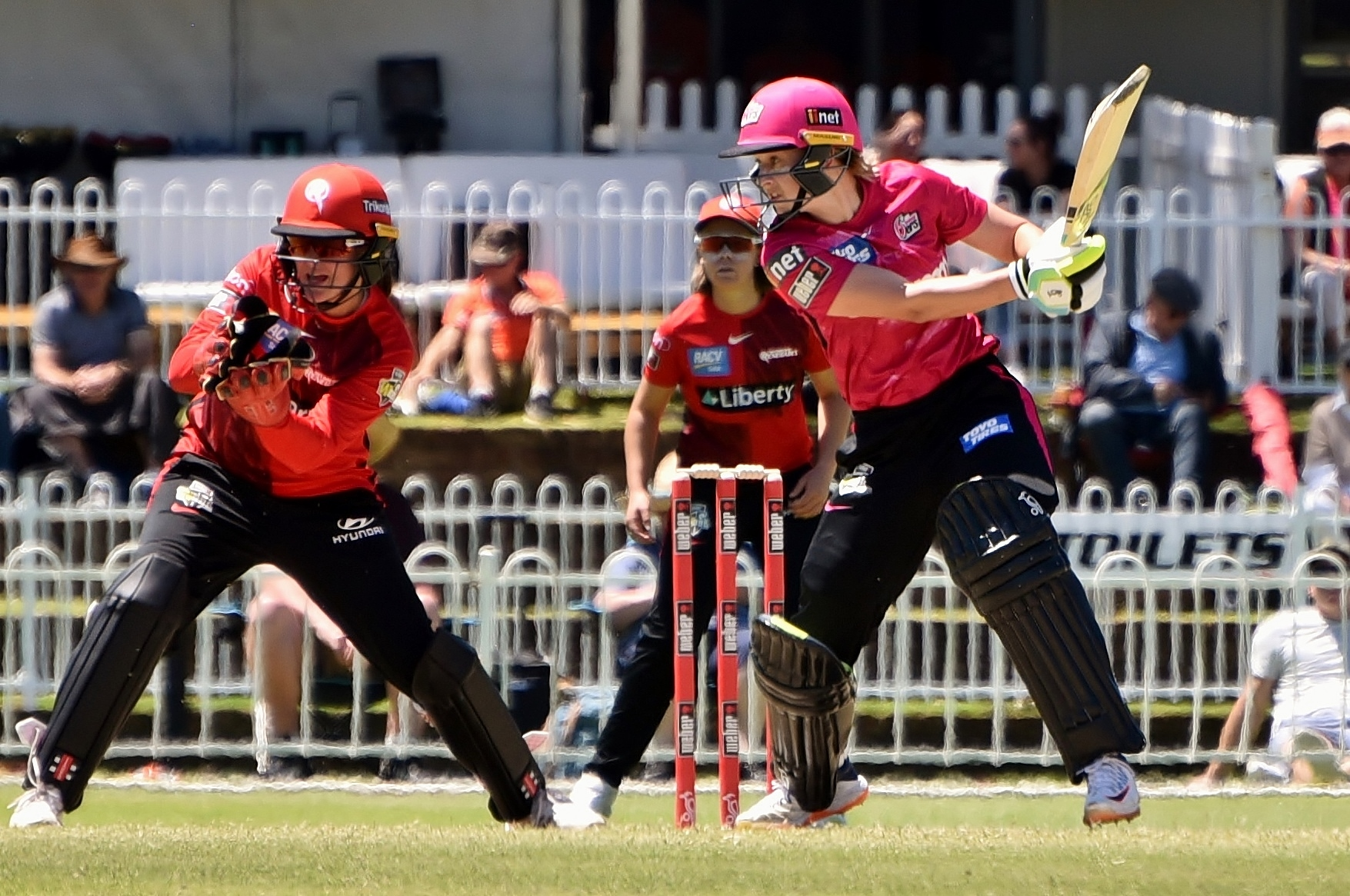
- Brown batting for Sydney Sixers during WBBL|07

Personal information
- Full name: Maitlan Joy Brown
- Born: 5 June 1997 (age 29); Taree, New South Wales, Australia
- Batting: Right-handed
- Bowling: Right-arm fast
- Role: Bowler

Domestic team information
- Years: Team
- 2016/17–2020/21: Australian Capital Territory
- 2016/17–2020/21: Melbourne Renegades (squad no. 77)
- 2021/22–present: New South Wales
- 2021/22–present: Sydney Sixers
- 2023: Southern Vipers
- 2023: Southern Brave
- 2026: Manchester Super Giants

Career statistics
Competition	List A	Twenty20
Matches	54	120
Runs scored	417	676
Batting average	14.37	13.52
100s/50s	0/0	0/0
Top score	43	35
Balls bowled	1,992	1,748
Wickets	63	83
Bowling average	26.44	25.19
5 wickets in innings	0	0
10 wickets in match	0	0
Best bowling	4/23	3/16
Catches/stumpings	18/–	33/–
- Source: CricketArchive, 16 January 2025

Maitlan Joy Brown (born 5 June 1997) is an Australian cricketer. She plays as a right-arm fast bowler and right-handed batter for the New South Wales Breakers in the Women's National Cricket League (WNCL), and for the Sydney Sixers in the Women's Big Bash League (WBBL).

== Early and personal life ==
Brown was born on 5 June 1997 in Taree, New South Wales, and grew up in nearby Wingham. She has generated some attention for a skill that has been described as "bizarre", namely her ability to speak and sing with her mouth shut. She has said that she taught herself the skill as a child, while sitting in the car on long road trips with her family. She can also juggle.

In addition to cricket, Brown is a designer. She studied industrial design at the University of Canberra, and runs her own business.

== Domestic career ==
As a youngster, Brown was part of the New South Wales academy and played for various youth teams before being released in 2016. She was then signed by the ACT Meteors on a rookie contract and ended up playing all six matches for the team in the 2016–17 WNCL season. She also joined the Melbourne Renegades for WBBL|02, and produced "several exciting cameos" including 30 off 15 balls against the Sydney Sixers.

In WBBL|03, Brown was the Renegades' second-highest wicket-taker with 15 scalps. She was included in the 2018 Women's National Performance Squad.

She finished as the Renegades' second-highest wicket-taker in WBBL|05 with 16 wickets but was unable to prevent the team losing to the Brisbane Heat in the semi-final.

On 6 November 2020, Brown was ruled out of the remainder of the WBBL|06 season with a hamstring problem which also kept her out of the 2020–21 WNCL season.

On 12 May 2021, it was announced that Brown had moved from the Meteors to the New South Wales Breakers, the state side for which she had played at academy level.

== International career ==
In April 2017, she toured Sri Lanka with the Australia A squad, and in August 2017 she was one of eight players named in Cricket Australia's inaugural Women's National Performance Squad. In April 2019, Cricket Australia awarded her with a contract with the National Performance Squad ahead of the 2019–20 season.

In August 2020, Brown was named in Australia's limited-overs squads for their home series against New Zealand.

In August 2021, Brown was named in Australia's squad for their series against India, which included a one-off day/night Test match as part of the tour. In January 2022, Brown was named in Australia's A squad for their series against England A, with the matches being played alongside the Women's Ashes.
