= Sydney Sixers (WBBL) =

Australian women's Twenty20 cricket team

- League: Women's Big Bash League

Personnel
- Captain: Ashleigh Gardner
- Coach: Peter Clarke

Team information
- City: Sydney
- Colours: Magenta
- Home ground: North Sydney Oval
- Capacity: 20,000
- Secondary home ground(s): Hurstville Oval; Drummoyne Oval
- Secondary ground capacity: 5,000; 5,500

History
- Twenty20 debut: 6 December 2015
- WBBL wins: 2: WBBL02, WBBL03
- Official website: Sydney Sixers
Home kit

The Sydney Sixers (WBBL) are an Australian women's Twenty20 cricket team based in Sydney, New South Wales. They are one of two teams from Sydney to compete in the Women's Big Bash League, the other being the Sydney Thunder. Having won two championship titles and four minor premierships, the Sixers are the most successful WBBL franchise to date.

== History ==
=== Formation ===
One of eight founding WBBL teams, the Sydney Sixers are aligned with the men's team of the same name. At the official WBBL launch on 10 July 2015, Ellyse Perry was unveiled as the Sixers' first signing. Perry would also become the team's inaugural captain. On 12 November, New South Wales Breakers assistant Ben Sawyer was announced as the Sixers' inaugural head coach.

The Sixers played their first match against the Sydney Thunder at Howell Oval in Penrith on 6 December, losing by nine wickets. It took until their seventh match, a 20 December encounter with the Perth Scorchers at the Sydney Cricket Ground, to register a win.

=== Rivalries ===
==== Melbourne Renegades ====
The Sixers and Melbourne Renegades have combined to produce some of the most "thrilling" and "controversial" matches in the league's history, particularly revolving around close finishes, including:

- 3 January 2018, GMHBA Stadium: In "bizarre" scenes, Sixers batter Sarah Aley attempted to score a game-tying run on the last delivery despite Renegades wicket-keeper Emma Inglis, having received the ball over the stumps from fielder Kris Britt and thus believing the match to be over, already celebrating victory. After deliberation, officiating umpires deemed the ball was not dead and the run would be allowed, thereby forcing a super over which the Renegades nevertheless went on to win.
- 19 January 2019, Drummoyne Oval: In the Renegades' first finals appearance, with three runs required off the last ball for an upset victory, Sophie Molineux was short of her ground attempting the winning run due to a "miracle" piece of team fielding by Sixers players Erin Burns, Sarah Aley and Alyssa Healy. In the resulting super over, Sixers captain Ellyse Perry hit a six off Molly Strano to eliminate the Renegades from the tournament. The match, in conjunction with the other semi-final played earlier in the day, was hailed as "the irrefutable rise of women's cricket" and "sport with drama, skill and unpredictability – a potent recipe for success".
- 17 November 2019, Drummoyne Oval: The Renegades, requiring 28 runs off the last 12 balls with only three wickets in hand, pulled off a "great escape" victory against the Sixers through a last-ball six from Courtney Webb against the bowling of Marizanne Kapp. It marked the first time a WBBL team had won a match when needing more than four runs off the final legal delivery. (Note: In a 20 January 2017 match, the Melbourne Stars initially required 6 runs off the last ball but the Hobart Hurricanes conceded a boundary off a no-ball, and the Stars went on to score just one run off the final legal delivery to secure victory.) The ramifications of the result were season-shaping as the Renegades went on to edge out the Sixers for fourth spot on the ladder, making it the first season the Sixers would fail to qualify for finals.

==== Sydney Thunder ====
At the WBBL|02 season launch, Sydney Thunder captain Alex Blackwell said the Sixers "desperately want to beat us and we desperately want to beat them. It's set up to be a really good rivalry." In a joint media conference ahead of WBBL|05, Sixers captain Ellyse Perry said she considers the Thunder "our biggest rivals" while the Thunder's Rachel Priest claimed "it was a really intense rivalry right when I started with the team". Noteworthy matches include:

- 24 January 2016, Melbourne Cricket Ground: Having lost their first six games of the season, the Sixers stormed into the WBBL|01 final by winning nine consecutive matches. Their streak would come to an end in a low-scoring championship decider plagued by "probably the worst fielding seen all tournament" from both teams. Ultimately the Thunder scraped home by three wickets with three balls remaining to claim the inaugural Women's Big Bash title. Erin Osborne earned Player of the Final honours for her bowling figures of 3/21 off four overs.
- 14 January 2017, Sydney Cricket Ground: Defending a first innings total of 138, Sixers off-spinner Lauren Smith conceded seven runs in the last over to tie the game. With scores still level after the subsequent super over, the Thunder were awarded the win on the boundary count back rule. Despite the intense rivalry between the two teams, the match was noted for a sporting gesture by Thunder captain Alex Blackwell who, suspecting she interfered with the batter, withdrew an appeal that would have led to the dismissal of the Sixers' Sara McGlashan.
- 15 November 2019, Drummoyne Oval: The Sixers cruised to a comfortable 40-run victory, having also defeated the Thunder by 49 runs in the season opener—Perry top-scoring with 81 on both occasions. This marked the first time either team would sweep their fellow Sydneysiders in the regular season.

==== Hobart Hurricanes ====
The Sixers and the Hobart Hurricanes have met in two semi-finals:

- 22 January 2016, Melbourne Cricket Ground: In a match initially shortened to 14 overs per side due to rain, the higher-ranked Hurricanes struggled in the first innings, managing a score of just 8/86. Further rain delays meant the Sixers' target was revised to 55 runs from eight overs, under the Duckworth–Lewis–Stern method. Sydney cruised to victory with all ten wickets in hand and ten balls remaining. Veteran off-spinner Lisa Sthalekar was named Player of the Match for her bowling figures of 3/9 from three overs.
- 25 January 2017, The Gabba: Acting captain Alyssa Healy belted 77 runs off 45 balls to help the Sixers to 6/169 in the first innings. In reply, the Hurricanes were skittled for a miserly 66 runs, setting a new WBBL record for lowest all out total. The 103-run margin also set a new WBBL record for the largest victory by a team batting first.

The Sixers defeated the Hurricanes in their first eleven encounters, setting a WBBL record for the longest head-to-head winning streak. The Hurricanes finally defeated the Sixers on their twelfth attempt:

- 20 November 2019, North Sydney Oval: With Ellyse Perry sidelined due to a shoulder injury, the Sixers faltered early to a score of 5/30. A resurgence, led by Marizanne Kapp's unbeaten 55 off 40 balls, helped Sydney to a total of 7/134. Hobart's chase got off to a shaky start as they found themselves down 4/22 after five overs. A healthy partnership between batters Nicola Carey and Corinne Hall came to an end in the 15th over when Hall was spectacularly caught by former Hurricanes player Erin Burns in the outfield. With 44 runs required from the final 33 deliveries, Carey went on to make 55 not out while a quickfire 29 by Chloe Tryon sealed victory for the Hurricanes with five wickets in hand and ten balls remaining. In addition to snapping their elongated head-to-head losing streak, the win set a new mark for Hobart's highest successful run chase. Belinda Vakarewa, who sliced through the Sixers' top-order, was named Player of the Match for her bowling figures of 4/19.

==== Perth Scorchers ====
The Sixers have met, and defeated, the Perth Scorchers in two championship deciders:

- 28 January 2017, WACA Ground: With captain Ellyse Perry sidelined due to a hamstring injury, the Sixers posted a modest total of 5/124 in the first innings. An unbeaten knock of 35 from 30 balls by Katherine Brunt was not enough to secure victory for the Scorchers, as the Sixers "fielded like demons and bowled dry" in a "veritable classic" to win by a narrow seven-run margin and claim their maiden title. Sarah Aley earned Player of the Final honours for her bowling figures of 4/23 off four overs.
- 4 February 2018, Adelaide Oval: Electing to bat first, the Scorchers were steamrolled for 99 all out. The Sixers experienced little difficulty in the run chase, mowing down the required target with nine wickets in hand and 30 balls remaining to claim a second consecutive WBBL title. Sarah Coyte earned Player of the Final honours for her bowling figures of 3/17 off four overs.

==== Brisbane Heat ====
The Sixers share a "growing rivalry" with the Brisbane Heat. However, ahead of WBBL|05, Sydney wicket-keeper Alyssa Healy claimed "(Brisbane) have made a bit more of it than we have in the last 12 to 18 months, it's not something we're thinking of too much." Noteworthy matches include:

- 26 January 2019, Drummoyne Oval: The Heat pulled off an upset victory in the WBBL|04 final to deny a Sixers three-peat, chasing down Sydney's total of 7/131 with just three wickets in hand and four balls remaining. Beth Mooney was named Player of the Final for her innings of 65 runs off 46 deliveries. Mooney, who had been receiving on-field medical treatment for the flu and heat stroke, revealed in a post-match interview that her ongoing game delays instigated sledging from several opponents: "It was kind of nice to know while I wasn't feeling well, I was going well enough to piss them off and they were getting frustrated at how long I was taking to face up... I've played enough cricket against (the Sixers) to know what gets under their skin and we definitely won that battle."
- 19 October 2019, North Sydney Oval: In their first match of the 2019–20 season, the Heat posted a total of 6/165 before bowling out the Sixers for just 73. The crushing 92-run deficit was the second-largest defeat for a chasing team in WBBL history, and also the Sixers' lowest-ever score.

== Captaincy records ==
There have been three captains in the Sixers' history, including matches featuring an acting captain.

Captain	Span	M	Won	Lost	Tied	NR	W–L%
Ellyse Perry	2015–24	136	77	53	1	5	59.23
Alyssa Healy	2017–19	8	4	4	0	0	50
Ashleigh Gardner	2023–25	12	6	5	0	1	54.55

== Season summaries ==
Chart of yearly table positions for Sydney Sixers in WBBL

Season	W–L	Pos.	Finals	Coach	Captain	Most Runs	Most Wickets	Most Valuable Player	Refs
2015–16	8–6	3rd	RU	Ben Sawyer	Ellyse Perry	Ellyse Perry – 430	Sarah Aley – 19	Marizanne Kapp	
2016–17	9–5*	1st*	C	Ben Sawyer	Ellyse Perry (Note: Alyssa Healy stood in as acting captain for three games)	Alyssa Healy – 479	Sarah Aley – 28^	Alyssa Healy	
2017–18	10–4*	1st*	C	Ben Sawyer	Ellyse Perry	Ellyse Perry – 552*	Sarah Aley – 23*	Ellyse Perry	
2018–19	10–4*	1st*	RU	Ben Sawyer	Ellyse Perry	Ellyse Perry – 778^	Marizanne Kapp – 20	Ellyse Perry*	
2019	7–7	5th	DNQ	Ben Sawyer	Ellyse Perry (Note: Alyssa Healy stood in as acting captain for five games)	Ellyse Perry – 469	Marizanne Kapp – 15	Marizanne Kapp	
2020	6–6	5th	DNQ	Ben Sawyer	Ellyse Perry	Alyssa Healy – 402	Marizanne Kapp – 13	Alyssa Healy	
2021	4–9	8th	DNQ	Ben Sawyer	Ellyse Perry	Ellyse Perry – 358	Lauren Cheatle – 10	Nicole Bolton	
2022	11–2*	1st*	RU	Charlotte Edwards	Ellyse Perry	Ellyse Perry – 403	Ashleigh Gardner – 23	Ashleigh Gardner*	
2023	7–7	5th	DNQ	Charlotte Edwards	Ellyse Perry	Ellyse Perry – 496	Lauren Cheatle and Ashleigh Gardner – 21	Ellyse Perry	
2024	3–5	6th	DNQ	Charlotte Edwards	Ellyse Perry	Ellyse Perry – 424*	Ashleigh Gardner – 16	Ellyse Perry* (Note: Joint player of the tournament with Jess Jonassen.)	
2025	6–3	2nd	CF	Matthew Mott	Ashleigh Gardner	Ellyse Perry – 412	Ashleigh Gardner – 19* (Note: Georgia Wareham also took 19 wickets.)	Ashleigh Gardner	

Legend
DNQ	Did not qualify	SF	Semi-finalists	*	Led the league
EF	Lost the Eliminator	RU	Runners-up	^	League record
KF	Lost the Knockout	CF	Lost the Challenger	C	Champions

== Home grounds ==
Venue	Games hosted by season											
Venue	01	02	03	04	05	06	07	08	09	10	11	Total
Blacktown ISP	–	–	–	–	–	2	N/A (Note: No WBBL|07 matches were scheduled to be played in New South Wales due to border restrictions related to the COVID-19 pandemic.)	–	–	–	–	2
Drummoyne Oval	2	1	–	2	1	1	N/A	–	–	–	–	7
Hurstville Oval	1	2	3	2	3	1	N/A	–	–	–	–	12
North Dalton Park	–	–	1	–	–	–	N/A	–	–	–	–	1
North Sydney Oval	–	4	1	2	4	5	N/A	4	5	3	5	33
Sydney Cricket Ground	2	2	3	2	–	–	N/A	–	1	1	–	11
Sydney Showground Stadium	–	–	–	–	–	3	N/A	–	–	–	–	3
Waverley Oval	1	–	–	–	–	–	N/A	–	–	–	–	1

== Current squad ==
The squad of the Sydney Sixers for WBBL|12 as of 26 October 2026.

- Players with international caps are listed in **bold**.
- * denotes a player who is unavailable for rest of the season.

No.	Name	Nat.	Birth Date	Batting Style	Bowling Style	Additional Info.
Batters
47	**Sophia Dunkley**	England	16 July 1998 (age 28)	Right-handed	Right-arm leg spin	International Signing
26	**Elsa Hunter**	Malaysia Australia	15 February 2005 (age 21)	Right-handed	Right-arm off spin	Signed as a local player
38	Eva Ragg	Australia	8 November 2004 (age 22)	Right-handed	Right-arm off spin	
All-rounders
88	Maitlan Brown	Australia	5 June 1997 (age 29)	Right-handed	Right-arm fast	
29	**Erin Burns**	Australia	22 June 1988 (age 38)	Right-handed	Right-arm off spin	
54	**Alice Capsey**	England	11 August 2004 (age 22)	Right-handed	Right-arm off spin	International Signing
6	**Ashleigh Gardner**	Australia	15 April 1997 (age 29)	Right-handed	Right-arm off spin	Captain
48	**Amelia Kerr**	New Zealand	13 October 2000 (age 26)	Right-handed	Right-arm leg spin	International Signing
8	**Ellyse Perry**	Australia	3 November 1990 (age 36)	Right-handed	Right-arm medium	
Wicket-keepers
7	Maddy Darke	Australia	30 March 2001 (age 25)	Right-handed	—N/a	Ruled out through injury
12	Grace Lyons	Australia	12 September 2005 (age 21)	Right-handed	—N/a	Local Replacement Player
Bowlers
18	Caoimhe Bray	Australia	23 September 2009 (age 17)	Right-handed	Right-arm medium	
5	**Lauren Cheatle**	Australia	6 November 1998 (age 28)	Left-handed	Left-arm fast-medium	
25	**Sarah Coyte**	Australia	30 March 1991 (age 35)	Right-handed	Right-arm medium	
16	Frankie Nicklin	Australia	20 January 2005 (age 21)	Right-handed	Right-arm leg spin	
37	Courtney Sippel	Australia	27 April 2001 (age 25)	Left-handed	Right-arm medium	

== Players ==
=== Australian representatives ===
(Australia) The following is a list of cricketers who have played for the Sixers after making their debut in the national women's team (the period they spent as both a Sixers squad member and an Australian-capped player is in brackets):

- Alyssa Healy (WBBL|01–11)
- Ellyse Perry (WBBL|01–12)
- Lisa Sthalekar (WBBL|01–02)
- Sarah Aley (WBBL|03–06)
- Lauren Cheatle (WBBL|03–12)
- Sarah Coyte (WBBL|03, 12)
- Ashleigh Gardner (WBBL|03–12)
- Erin Burns (WBBL|05–12)
- Nicole Bolton (WBBL|07–08)
- Stella Campbell (WBBL|07–08)

=== Overseas marquees ===
- (South Africa) Marizanne Kapp (WBBL|01–06)
- (England) Laura Marsh (WBBL|01)
- (New Zealand) Sara McGlashan (WBBL|01–04)
- (England) Amy Jones (WBBL|02–03)
- (South Africa) Dane van Niekerk (WBBL|02–06)
- (England) Hollie Armitage (WBBL|05)
- (India) Shafali Verma (WBBL|07)
- (India) Radha Yadav (WBBL|07)
- (New Zealand) Suzie Bates (WBBL|08–09)
- (England) Sophie Ecclestone (WBBL|08, 10)
- (New Zealand) Jess Kerr (WBBL|09)
- (South Africa) Chloe Tryon (WBBL|09)
- (England) Linsey Smith (WBBL|09)
- (England) Hollie Armitage (WBBL|10)
- (New Zealand) Amelia Kerr (WBBL|10–12)
- (England) Sophia Dunkley (WBBL|11–12)
- (England) Mady Villiers (WBBL|11)
- (England) Alice Capsey (WBBL|12)

=== Associate rookies ===
- (Scotland) Rachel Scholes (WBBL|01)
- (Ireland) Kim Garth (WBBL|02–03)
- (Scotland) Sarah Bryce (WBBL|10)

== Honours ==
- Champions: 2 – WBBL|02, WBBL|03
- Runners-Up: 3 – WBBL|01, WBBL|04, WBBL|08
- Minor Premiers: 4 – WBBL|02, WBBL|03, WBBL|04, WBBL|08
- Finals Appearances: 6 – WBBL|01, WBBL|02, WBBL|03, WBBL|04, WBBL|08, WBBL|11
- Wooden Spoons: 1 – WBBL|07

== Statistics and awards ==
=== Team stats ===
- Win–loss Record:

Opposition	M	Won	Lost	Tied	NR	W–L%
Adelaide Strikers	22	13	9	0	0	59.09
Brisbane Heat	22	8	13	0	1	38.1
Hobart Hurricanes	23	20	3	0	0	86.96
Melbourne Renegades	21	13	7	0	1	65
Melbourne Stars	22	11	10	0	1	52.38
Perth Scorchers	23	10	12	1	0	45.45
Sydney Thunder	23	12	8	0	3	60
Total	156	87	62	1	6	58.39

- Highest score in an innings: 4/242 (20 overs) vs Melbourne Stars, 9 December 2017
- Highest successful chase: 5/184 (18.4 overs) vs Melbourne Stars, 22 November 2020
- Lowest successful defence: 5/124 (20 overs) vs Perth Scorchers, 28 January 2017
- Largest victory:
  - Batting first: 103 runs vs Hobart Hurricanes, 25 January 2017
  - Batting second: 43 balls remaining vs Perth Scorchers, 9 November 2025
- Longest winning streak: 9 matches (20 December 2015 – 22 January 2016)
- Longest losing streak: 6 matches

=== Individual stats ===
- Most runs: Ellyse Perry – 5,100
- Highest score in an innings: Ashleigh Gardner – 114 (52) vs Melbourne Stars, 9 December 2017
- Highest partnership: Ellyse Perry and Alyssa Healy – 199* vs Melbourne Stars, 3 November 2019
- Most wickets: Ashleigh Gardner – 121
- Best bowling figures in an innings: Ashleigh Gardner – 5/15 (4 overs) vs Perth Scorchers, 9 November 2025
- Hat-tricks taken:
  - Dane van Niekerk vs Hobart Hurricanes, 17 December 2017
  - Marizanne Kapp vs Melbourne Stars, 26 October 2019
  - Caoimhe Bray vs Sydney Thunder, 15 November 2025
- Most catches (fielder): Ellyse Perry – 67
- Most dismissals (wicket-keeper): Alyssa Healy – 103 (58 catches, 45 stumpings)

=== Individual awards ===
- Player of the Match:
  - Ellyse Perry – 30
  - Alyssa Healy – 19
  - Ashleigh Gardner – 15
  - Erin Burns – 5
  - Sarah Aley, Marizanne Kapp, and Dane van Niekerk – 4
  - Sarah Coyte and Sara McGlashan – 2
  - Suzie Bates, Caoimhe Bray, Mathilda Carmichael, Amelia Kerr, Lisa Sthalekar, Chloe Tyron, and Shafali Verma – 1
- WBBL Player of the Final:
  - Sarah Aley – WBBL|02
  - Sarah Coyte – WBBL|03
- WBBL Player of the Tournament:
  - Ellyse Perry (2) – WBBL|04, WBBL|10
  - Ashleigh Gardner – WBBL|08
- WBBL Team of the Tournament:
  - Ellyse Perry (8) – WBBL|01, WBBL|02, WBBL|03, WBBL|04, WBBL|05, WBBL|09, WBBL|10 , WBBL|11
  - Marizanne Kapp (4) – WBBL|01, WBBL|02, WBBL|04, WBBL|05
  - Ashleigh Gardner (3) – WBBL|02, WBBL|08 , WBBL|11
  - Sarah Aley (2) – WBBL|02, WBBL|03
  - Alyssa Healy (2) – WBBL|04, WBBL|08
  - Sara McGlashan – WBBL|01
  - Dane van Niekerk – WBBL|03
  - Erin Burns – WBBL|08
  - Lauren Cheatle – WBBL|09
- WBBL Young Gun Award: Ashleigh Gardner – WBBL|02

== Sponsors ==
Year	Kit Manufacturer	Chest Sponsor	Back Sponsor	Breast Sponsor	Sleeve Sponsor
2015–16	Majestic	Rebel	XVenture	XVenture	Rebel
2016–17	Majestic	Rebel	Bioglan	Priceline Pharmacy	Rebel
2017–18	Majestic	Rebel	Nature's Gift	Priceline Pharmacy	Rebel
2018–19	Majestic	Priceline Pharmacy	Nature's Gift	iiNet	Rebel
2019–20	Majestic	Priceline Pharmacy	Ring.com	Toyo Tires	Rebel
2020–21	Majestic	Humm	Sydney Water	Toyo Tires	Rebel
2021–22	Nike	Humm	Humm	Toyo Tires	iiNet
2022–23	Nike	Humm	Humm	Toyo Tires	Weber
2023–24	Nike	Belong	Sixt	Toyo Tires	Weber
2024–25	Nike	Belong		Toyo Tires	Merlin
2025–26	New Balance	Belong	Aiper	Toyo Tires	Merlin

== See also ==
- Sydney Sixers
- Cricket NSW
- Sydney Thunder (WBBL)
- New South Wales Breakers
