= Erin Burns =

Australian cricketer

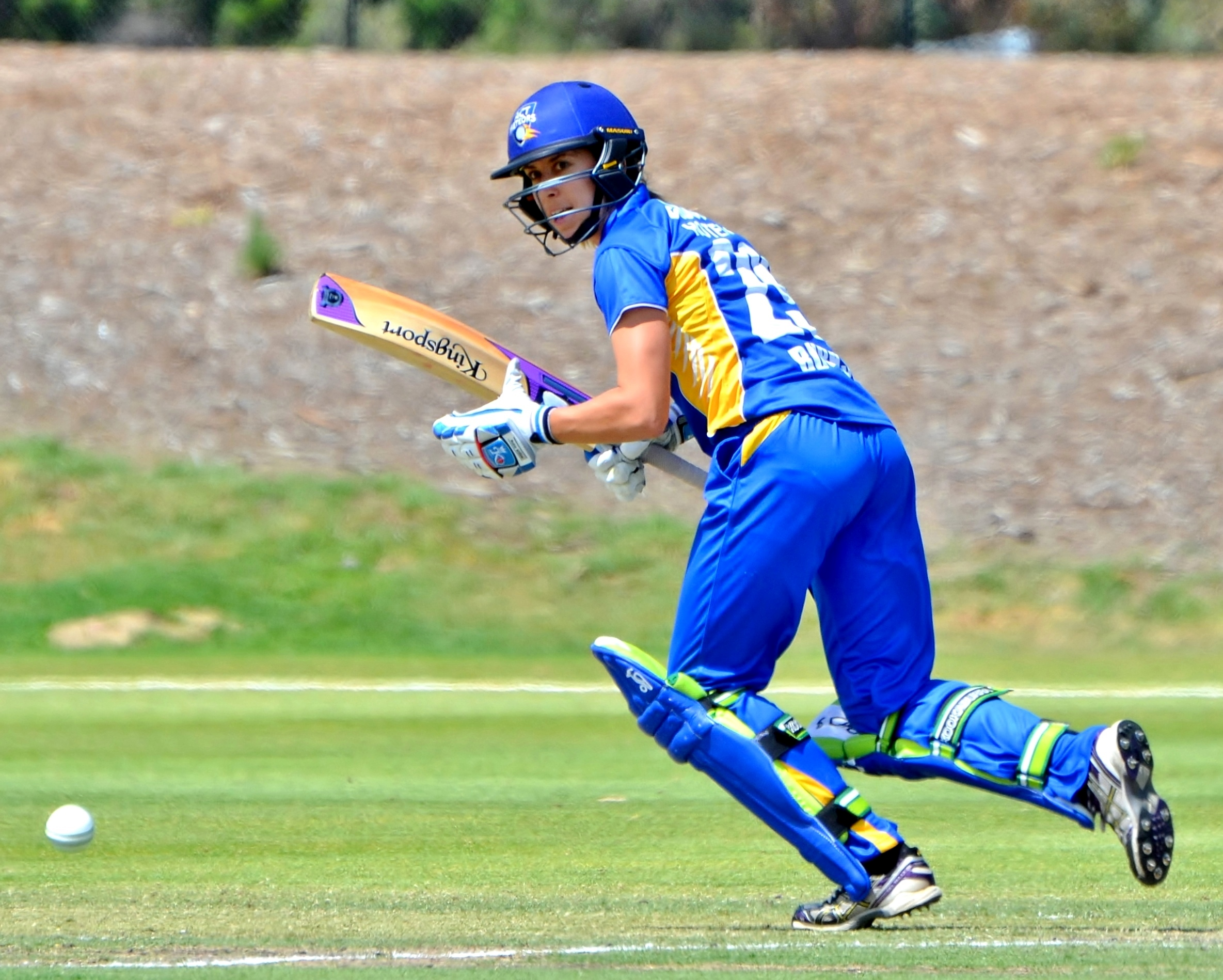
- Burns batting for the ACT Meteors, 2017

Personal information
- Full name: Erin Alexandra Burns
- Born: 22 June 1988 (age 38); Wollongong, New South Wales, Australia
- Batting: Right-handed
- Bowling: Right-arm off break
- Role: All-rounder

International information
- National side: Australia
- Only ODI (cap 141): 8 September 2019 v West Indies
- T20I debut (cap 52): 14 September 2019 v West Indies
- Last T20I: 2 October 2019 v Sri Lanka

Domestic team information
- Years: Team
- 2009/10–2016/17: Tasmania
- 2014/15–2015/16: Wellington
- 2015/16–2016/17: Hobart Hurricanes
- 2017/18–2018/19: Australian Capital Territory
- 2017/18–present: Sydney Sixers
- 2019/20–present: New South Wales
- 2021: Birmingham Phoenix
- 2022: Manchester Originals
- 2023: Royal Challengers Bangalore
- 2023: Central Sparks
- 2023: Birmingham Phoenix
- 2024: Northern Diamonds
- 2024: London Spirit

Career statistics
Competition	WODI	WT20I	WLA	WT20
Matches	1	5	120	235
Runs scored	–	30	2,731	3,879
Batting average	–	–	26.77	20.74
100s/50s	–	0/0	2/12	0/16
Top score	–	30*	107*	90
Balls bowled	24	48	4,374	2,592
Wickets	0	0	100	127
Bowling average	–	–	35.70	23.32
5 wickets in innings	0	0	2	1
10 wickets in match	–	–	–	–
Best bowling	–	–	5/36	5/25
Catches/stumpings	0/–	1/–	62/–	107/–
- Source: CricketArchive, 6 August 2025

Erin Alexandra Burns (born 22 June 1988) is an Australian cricketer who plays as a right-handed batter and right-arm off break bowler. She has appeared in one One Day Internationals and five Twenty20 Internationals for Australia, making her debut in September 2019 against the West Indies. She plays for New South Wales in the Women's National Cricket League and Sydney Sixers in the Women's Big Bash League. She has previously played for Tasmania, Wellington, Hobart Hurricanes, Australian Capital Territory and Birmingham Phoenix.

== Early life ==
Born in Wollongong, Burns found herself unable to progress any further through the strong New South Wales system than the state's second XI. In 2009, however, the Tasmanian Roar was casting around for extra talent for its entry to interstate competition, and rang Burns with an offer of a place which she accepted.

== Tasmanian Roar ==
Burns won the Tasmanian Roar Player of the Year award for 2009–10. She was a squad member of the Southern Stars in 2011, and toured New Zealand with the Shooting Stars in 2012. She remained part of the Shooting Stars squad, and was once again Tasmanian Roar Player of the Year, in 2012–13. In that season's Australian Women's Twenty20 Cup, she played such a prominent role for the Roar, including by hitting 90 runs against Victorian Spirit off just 50 deliveries, with 10 boundaries and four sixes, that she was named the ACA women's Player of the Month for December 2012.

In late 2013, Burns suffered a serious cartilage tear in her knee that threatened her playing career. However, Sydney Swans club doctor Nathan Gibbs treated the injury with stem cell injections, which were more effective than anticipated; Burns returned to the Roar at a T20 match in November 2014.

In October 2016, during the opening round of that season's WNCL, Burns top scored for the Roar in the match against the South Australian Scorpions with 45 runs, and also took two wickets.

== Hobart Hurricanes ==
Burns was included in the Hurricanes squad for its inaugural WBBL|01 season (2015–16), during which she scored 224 runs at 17.23 with a highest score of 34, and took 7 wickets at 30.14 with best figures of 2/22. She also achieved the feat of taking three catches in a single innings.

During the WBBL|02 season (2016–17), Burns played a key role in two Hurricanes wins. On 18 December 2016, she hit a four through mid-wicket off the final ball of a super over to claim victory against the Melbourne Renegades, and propel the Hurricanes to equal first on the WBBL table. On 5 January 2017, after being promoted to open the Hurricanes' innings against Sydney Thunder, she scored 46 runs, and shared in a second wicket partnership of 64 with Heather Knight, to help lead the Hurricanes to a match winning 171/3, which eventually proved to be the highest innings total for WBBL|02.

In November 2018, she was named in the Sydney Sixers' squad for the 2018–19 Women's Big Bash League season.

== International career ==
In August 2019, Burns was named in Australia's squad for their series against the West Indies. She made her Women's One Day International (WODI) debut for Australia against the West Indies on 8 September 2019. She made her Women's Twenty20 International (WT20I) debut for Australia, also against the West Indies, on 14 September 2019.

In January 2020, she was named in Australia's squad for the 2020 ICC Women's T20 World Cup in Australia. In January 2022, Burns was named in Australia's A squad for their series against England A, with the matches being played alongside the Women's Ashes.

== Personal life ==
Burns completed a degree in Exercise Science in 2009, and later, with the assistance of a University of Sydney Elite Athlete Program (EAP) scholarship, obtained a master's degree in physiotherapy. She has worked as both an Exercise Physiologist and Physiotherapist, and has a particular interest in sporting injuries. While undergoing rehabilitation for her knee injury, Burns took up cycling to strengthen her knee. In 2015, she completed a 1,000 km (620 mi) bike ride from her home town of Wollongong to Melbourne to raise money for Bowel Cancer Australia, in honour of her late father, who died from the disease in 2005.

Burns married her wife Anna in 2019, and has supported initiatives to include the LGBTQI community as part of the Sydney Sixers.
