= Lauren Cheatle =

Australian cricketer

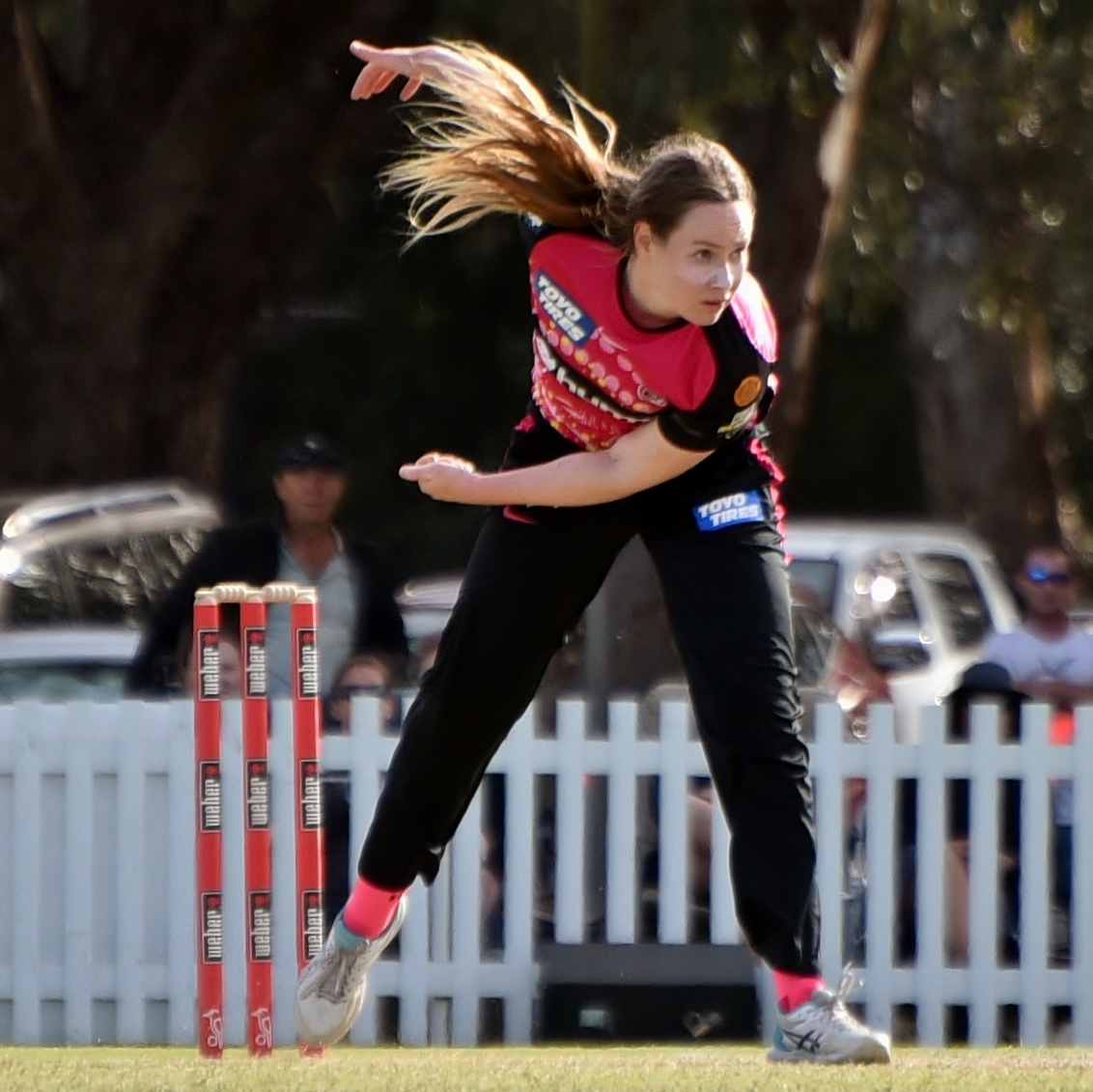
- Cheatle bowling for Sydney Sixers during WBBL|07

Personal information
- Full name: Lauren Roma Cheatle
- Born: 6 November 1998 (age 28); Sydney, New South Wales, Australia
- Batting: Left-handed
- Bowling: Left arm fast medium
- Role: Bowler
- Relatives: Giles Cheatle (father)

International information
- National side: Australia (2016–2023)
- Only Test (cap 184): 21 December 2023 v India
- ODI debut (cap 133): 26 February 2017 v New Zealand
- Last ODI: 3 March 2019 v New Zealand
- T20I debut (cap 43): 29 January 2016 v India
- Last T20I: 26 March 2016 v Ireland

Domestic team information
- Years: Team
- 2009–2015/16: Bowral Cricket Club
- 2015/16–present: New South Wales
- 2015/16–2016/17: Sydney Thunder
- 2018/19–present: Sydney Sixers
- 2024: Southern Brave

Career statistics
Competition	Test	WODI	WT20I	LA
Matches	1	4	7	53
Runs scored	6	13	4	149
Batting average	6.00	13.00	–	13.54
100s/50s	0/0	0/0	0/0	0/0
Top score	6	7	4*	26
Balls bowled	54	144	114	2,474
Wickets	0	2	5	59
Bowling average	–	71.00	24.40	30.50
5 wickets in innings	–	0	0	0
10 wickets in match	–	0	0	0
Best bowling	–	1/42	2/13	4/42
Catches/stumpings	0/–	1/–	1/–	12/–
- Source: CricketArchive, 6 August 2025

Lauren Roma Cheatle (born 6 November 1998) is an Australian cricketer who plays as a left-arm fast-medium bowler and left-handed batter. She plays domestic cricket for New South Wales in the Women's National Cricket League (WNCL) and the Sydney Sixers in the Women's Big Bash League (WBBL). Between 2016 and 2019, she played 11 matches for the Australian national cricket team.

== Domestic cricket ==
Cheatle grew up playing for the historic Bowral Cricket Club, coming through the club’s junior pathway before featuring regularly in local senior competitions. Her early performances drew attention beyond New South Wales, and she later spent time with an English minor county outfit, gaining experience in different conditions and tightening her left-arm seam fundamentals.

After returning to the New South Wales system, Cheatle progressed through the state’s youth ranks and earned selection for the New South Wales Breakers in the Women's National Cricket League. Known for her ability to swing the new ball, she became a consistent presence in the Breakers attack and was later entrusted with leadership responsibilities.

Cheatle was appointed captain of the NSW Breakers ahead of the 2025–26 WNCL season, reflecting her standing as one of the side’s most experienced domestic performers. She played her first match for the Breakers on 1 November 2015.

Cheatle previously played for the Sydney Thunder in the Women's Big Bash League. In the 2015–16 season, she took 18 wickets finishing equal 4th in the most wickets list. She was at the bowler's end when the Thunder won the inaugural WBBL final when Claire Koski scored two runs off an overthrow. She joined the Sydney Sixers ahead of the 2017–18 Women's Big Bash League season.

== International career ==
Cheatle played her first match for the Australia women's national cricket team in a Women's Twenty20 International against India on 29 January 2016.

On 26 February 2017, she made her Women's One Day International (WODI) debut against New Zealand.

After missing out on Australia's squad for the 2017 World Cup in England, Cheatle was recalled to the side as part of their squad for the Women's Ashes. She was named in both the ODI squad and the Test squad. However, after playing in a pink ball warm-up match against the ACT Meteors at Manuka Oval, she was unable, due to a back injury, to make a Test debut.

In April 2019, Cricket Australia awarded her with a contract with the National Performance Squad ahead of the 2019–20 season.

In December 2023, she was named in Australia's squad for their Test series against India. She made her Women's Test debut for Australia on 21 December 2023.

== Off the field ==
As of 2023, Cheatle was combining her professional cricket career with part-time work for What Ability, a disability support service.
