= Women's Big Bash League =

Australian professional Twenty20 cricket league

- Logo of the Women's Big Bash League
- Countries: Australia
- Administrator: Cricket Australia
- Format: Twenty20
- First edition: 2015–16
- Latest edition: 2025–26
- Next edition: 2026–27
- Tournament format: Double round-robin and knockout finals
- Number of teams: 8
- Current champion: Hobart Hurricanes (1st Title)
- Most successful: Sixers, Strikers, Heat, Thunder – 2 titles each
- Most runs: Beth Mooney – 5,600
- Most wickets: Jess Jonassen – 184
- TV: Seven Network; Fox Cricket
- Website: WBBL

The Women's Big Bash League (WBBL), also known as Weber WBBL for sponsorship reasons, is a professional Women's Twenty20 cricket league in Australia. Established in 2015, it replaced the Australian Women's Twenty20 Cup, which ran from 2009–10 season to 2014–15. The competition features eight city-based franchises and is branded identically to the Big Bash League (BBL). Originally running alongside the BBL, the tournament was held in December to February before moving to a standalone schedule for the 2019–20 season onwards. It has since been held sometime between October and December. It is regarded as having "changed the landscape of women's cricket" and was the first domestic T20 franchise competition for women.

The collective performance of the Sydney Sixers and the Sydney Thunder in the league's initial years—combining for four titles in the first six seasons—has partially echoed the dominance of New South Wales in the Women's National Cricket League (WNCL), the 50-over counterpart of the WBBL, though neither have won a title since the 2020–21 season. The current champions are the Hobart Hurricanes, who won the 2025–26 season after defeating the Perth Scorchers by 8 wickets in the final.

== History ==
=== Women's International Cricket League ===
In early 2014, the formation of an international women's Twenty20 competition, based around the franchise model of the Indian Premier League was announced. Headed by former Australian cricketer Lisa Sthalekar and Australian businessman Shaun Martyn, the proposal involved six privately owned Singapore-based teams with players earning over $US4000 per season.

There was strong support from top female players for the Women's International Cricket League (WICL) concept, and backing was sought from the International Cricket Council, while former international cricketers Geoff Lawson and Clive Lloyd were on the board of the organisation.

The concept was dealt a blow in early June, when the England and Wales Cricket Board announced that they would refuse to release centrally contracted English players. At the same time, Cricket Australia (CA) announced it would not endorse the WICL either. Both organisations expressed concern that the tournament was not being run by a national cricket board, but a private company.

=== Australian Women's Twenty20 Cup ===
Before the establishment of the Women's Big Bash League, Cricket Australia conducted a national T20 competition: the Australian Women's Twenty20 Cup. The tournament ran in conjunction with the WNCL (the national women's 50-over competition) with the final played as a double header alongside the KFC Twenty20 Big Bash and later the Big Bash League. The competition ran from the 2009–10 season to 2014–15 after some exhibition games were held from 2007 to 2009.

Cricket Australia decided to replace the competition with the Women's Big Bash League in an attempt to further heighten the profile and professionalism of elite-level female cricket, thereby ideally helping to grow grassroots participation and viewership of the game among girls and women across the country.

== Establishment ==
On 19 January 2014, former Australian national team captain Belinda Clark revealed the planning for a women's BBL was in its early stages, with CA keen to take advantage of the rising popularity of women's cricket and the success of the men's BBL in its first season on free-to-air TV. On 19 February 2015, Cricket Australia announced that a Women's Big Bash League (WBBL) would commence in 2015–16, with teams aligned to the current men's competition. Each team's first player signing was unveiled at the official WBBL launch on 10 July 2015.

Cricket Australia CEO James Sutherland stated in a media release: "We see T20 as the premium format of the women's game and the WBBL is an exciting concept that will increase the promotion and exposure of women's cricket." He went on to claim: "Our existing female domestic competitions are arguably the strongest in the world, with the continued success of the top-ranked women's team, the Southern Stars, a testament to that." Cricket Australia executive Mike McKenna said: "Our goal is to see cricket become the sport of choice for women and girls across the nation, whether as participants or fans."

On 13 October 2015, 100 of Australia's elite cricketers joined to pledge $20 million towards the growth of cricket in Australia, to help grassroots level Cricket, support former players and develop further opportunities for female cricketers.

== Teams ==
Location of WBBL teams

The competition features the same eight city-based franchises that make up the Big Bash League. Each state's capital city features at least one team, with Sydney and Melbourne featuring two. The Sydney Thunder, the Sydney Sixers and the Brisbane Heat have each won two of the first six championships. The disproportionate success achieved by the two teams based in New South Wales, i.e. the Thunder and the Sixers, vaguely mirrors the historical dominance of the New South Wales Breakers in the Women's National Cricket League. The Sixers reached four finals throughout the first six seasons—twice as many as any other team—while producing the best overall win–loss record, and various media outlets have described them as the "glamour team" of the league.

Although the Melbourne Renegades and Melbourne Stars both use CitiPower Centre as their primary ground, they have historically differed in their choice of secondary grounds. The Renegades have hosted fixtures at regional venues west of Melbourne, such as Kardinia Park (both the major stadium and its neighbouring cricket field) and Eastern Oval, while the Stars have occasionally played home games at Casey Fields in Melbourne's south-east. A similar arrangement exists for the Sydney teams: the Thunder typically play home games at venues in the city's west while the Sixers tend to use grounds in the east, though both teams sometimes host fixtures at each other's primary ground due to the competition's "festival" structure which often sees multiple games scheduled at the same venue in a single day.

Since the move to a standalone fixture in 2024–25, the Hobart Hurricanes remain the only team to have the same primary venue as their male counterparts: the 20,000-capacity Ninja Stadium. With women's matches no longer played as double-headers alongside men's matches, the league has shifted away from the country's biggest stadiums, such as the Melbourne Cricket Ground and Adelaide Oval, in favour of smaller and more economically viable grounds. The intimate nature of these venues have been characterised as generating a relaxed and family-friendly atmosphere at WBBL games, which the league's teams have embraced—the Perth Scorchers, for example, have made a habit of encouraging spectators to bring their pet dogs along to matches at Lilac Hill Park.

Team	Location	Home ground (Note: Primary ground for WBBL|08)	Coach	Captain
Adelaide Strikers	Adelaide, South Australia	Karen Rolton Oval	Luke Williams	Tahlia McGrath
Brisbane Heat	Brisbane, Queensland	Allan Border Field	Mark Sorell	Georgia Redmayne
Hobart Hurricanes	Hobart, Tasmania	Ninja Stadium	Jude Coleman	Elyse Villani
Melbourne Renegades	Melbourne, Victoria	CitiPower Centre	Gavan Twining	Sophie Molineux
Melbourne Stars	Melbourne, Victoria	CitiPower Centre	Richard Pyrah	Meg Lanning
Perth Scorchers	Perth, Western Australia	WACA Ground	Becky Grundy	Sophie Devine
Sydney Sixers	Sydney, New South Wales	North Sydney Oval	Peter Clarke	Ashleigh Gardner
Sydney Thunder	Sydney, New South Wales	Drummoyne Oval	Lisa Keightley	Phoebe Litchfield

== Media coverage ==
=== 2015–17 ===
The 2015–16 Women's Big Bash League season was initially scheduled to have eight of the 59 matches air live on Australian free-to-air network One. Impressive television ratings convinced Network Ten to move the broadcast of the first-ever Melbourne derby between the Stars and Renegades to their main channel. The all-Sydney clashes between the Thunder and the Sixers on 2 January and the final on 24 January were likewise upgraded, whilst the broadcast schedule was also expanded to include the two semi-finals on One.

Network Ten broadcast eleven games of the 2016–17 Women's Big Bash League season. The commentary team was again led by Andrew Maher and featured Mel Jones and Lisa Sthalekar alongside Jason Bennett and Pete Lazer. Every game was also live streamed via the Cricket Australia Live App, cricket.com.au and the WBBL Facebook page.

A total of twelve 2017–18 matches were televised on free-to-air by Network Ten, including four on the opening weekend. The remaining 47 matches were live streamed on cricket.com.au, Mamamia and the Cricket Australia Live App.

=== 2018–present ===
In April 2018, as part of a new six-year broadcast rights deal, Cricket Australia announced 23 matches of each season (beginning with 2018–19) would be aired live on the Seven Network and simulcast on Fox Sports' dedicated cricket channel Fox Cricket, with the remaining 36 matches to be live streamed on the CA website and app.

Ahead of the 2019–20 season, Cricket Australia announced all 59 matches would also be streamed live and on demand through Kayo Sports.

An additional three games were initially allocated TV coverage on the Seven Network and Fox Cricket for the 2020–21 season, taking the overall number of televised WBBL|06 matches to 26. Alistair Dobson, Cricket Australia's Head of Big Bash Leagues, subsequently said: "The Rebel WBBL is the world's best cricket league for women and keeps getting better, which was reflected in a 21 per cent increase in multichannel audiences last season." After the season was rescheduled to take place entirely in a Sydney hub across a concentrated five-week period, due to the COVID-19 pandemic, Seven's allocated number of games was altered to a total of 24. On 15 October 2020, Cricket Australia announced Fox Cricket would broadcast an additional twelve matches, bringing the total number of televised WBBL|06 games to 36.

Coverage of the league received another boost for the following season with Fox Cricket broadcasting an additional 23 matches, meaning WBBL|07 would be the first time all games would be televised.

=== Broadcasting ===
The broadcasting rights for the Women's Big Bash League were held by Foxtel and the Seven Network under agreement with Cricket Australia running until the 2030–31 season. Foxtel broadcast matches through Fox Cricket and streamed them on Kayo Sports, while the Seven Network provided free-to-air television coverage of selected matches, with streaming available on 7plus.

List of broadcaster
Countries	Television rights	Streaming rights
Australia	Fox Cricket; Seven Network	Kayo Sports; 7plus
Indian subcontinent	Star Sports	FanCode
New Zealand	—N/a	—N/a
United Kingdom	Sky Sports	—N/a
Ireland	Sky Sports	
Caribbean	Rush Sports	Rush Live & Louder
United States	Willow	Cricbuzz
Canada	Willow	Cricbuzz
South Africa	SuperSport	—N/a

== Sponsorship ==
Previous WBBL logo

=== Naming rights ===
Sporting goods retailer Rebel was the official naming rights partner for WBBL|01. Rebel extended its sponsorship for a further five seasons, concluding after WBBL|06. Ahead of WBBL|07, barbecue grill manufacturer Weber was announced as the league's new official naming rights partner.

=== Apparel and headwear ===
Majestic Athletic was the league's official team apparel supplier for the first six seasons. Ahead of WBBL|07, Nike became the competition's official apparel partner, designing and producing the playing, training and supporter wear for all eight teams. '47 became the league's official on-field headwear supplier in WBBL|05, replacing New Era.

== Development ==
=== Tournament structure ===
In the inaugural season, teams were required to play games in sporadic clusters, such as twice in an afternoon or four times across three days. They were also forced to occasionally meet in neutral cities, with the most notable occurrence being the WBBL|03 final played between the Sydney Sixers and the Perth Scorchers at Adelaide Oval. Although such practices have become less common, they are yet to be eliminated.

The WBBL featured matches that were played as curtain-raisers to the men's Big Bash League until moving to a standalone format for the 2019–20 edition. Ahead of the 2018–19 season, Cricket Australia announced it would begin to introduce spectator admission fees for the league, starting with matches in Sydney. The WBBL|04 final at Drummoyne Oval became the league's first match to sell out.

Matches are typically played at boutique venues in each state's capital city, such as Junction Oval in Melbourne and Allan Border Field in Brisbane. However, regional centres have also embraced the opportunity to host WBBL games: on 5 January 2019 at Harrup Park in Mackay, a new record for the league's highest standalone attendance was achieved; in another example, Cricket North West scheduled a weekend free of local cricket to maximise attendance for a WBBL|05 game at West Park Oval in Burnie.

=== Player salaries ===
For WBBL|01, players would earn between $3000 and $10,000. This was in addition to the $7000 retainer which all female domestic cricketers would earn playing in the Women's National Cricket League (WNCL). Retainers for national representatives, of which a WBBL team can sign a maximum of five per season, ranged from $19,000 to $49,000 before taking match payments and tour fees into consideration.

In April 2016, Cricket Australia (CA) increased its elite female player payment pool from $2.36 million to $4.24 million for the 2016–17 season. With maximum retainers rising to $65,000 for national representatives and up to $15,000 for the WBBL, the best Australian women cricketers would earn a base salary of around $80,000 before exceeding earnings of six-figures with match payments and tour fees. Minimum retainers also increased, with domestic players earning at least $7000 in the WBBL and $11,000 in the WNCL. Australia's top domestic female cricketers would earn $26,000.

In August 2017, after extensive negotiations with the Australian Cricketers' Association (ACA), CA announced it would increase total female player payments from $7.5 million to $55.2 million. The deal, hailed as the biggest pay rise in the history of women's sport in Australia, meant domestic players in 2017–18 would earn at least $25,659 in the WNCL and a minimum of $10,292 (average of $19,926) in the WBBL.

For 2021–22, the last year of the original deal, domestic and national team players would earn an average of $58,000 and $211,000 respectively. However, days before the beginning of WBBL|07, CA and the ACA announced a $1.2 million increase in domestic retainers—$800,000 for the WNCL and $400,000 for the WBBL, resulting in a 22% and 14% pay rise for players in each respective league. 98 women's players were signed to a WNCL state contract for 2021–22 (not including the 15 national players with a more lucrative Cricket Australia deal), 76 of whom also held a WBBL contract.

In April 2023, CA and the ACA agreed to a new five-year Memorandum of Understanding that would see the player payment pool for women's cricket in Australia increase from $80 million to $133 million. Consequently the average WBBL retainer doubled to approximately $54,000 while the league's top earners would receive $133,000 per year. Domestic players featuring in both the WBBL and 50-over WNCL competition would on average earn $151,019 annually.

The table below details the rise in minimum and average retainers for domestic players (those playing in both the WBBL and WNCL) and nationally contracted players since the inaugural WBBL season. These figures do not include other potential earnings such as match fees, marketing payments, and prize money. Additionally, the figures for national retainers do not include those players' WBBL contracts.

Retainers for women's cricket in Australia
Season	Domestic player (Note: Players holding a contract with both a WNCL and WBBL team)		National player (Note: Players holding a Cricket Australia national contract)	
Season	Minimum	Average	Minimum	Average
2015–16	$10,000	$13,000	$19,000	$34,000
2016–17	$18,000	$22,000	$40,000	$52,500
2017–18	$35,951	$55,000	$72,076	$94,600
2022–23	$49,172	$65,660	$88,485	$111,775
2023–24	$71,945	$111,192	$110,606	$139,719

=== Quality of product ===
==== Scoring ====
Commentators have praised the rising standard of cricket displayed throughout the WBBL's early years, particularly the improved striking ability of batters. The inaugural season was typically dominated by bowlers, with the run rate sitting at 6.29 across the competition. By the 2018–19 season, it had increased to 7.31 with batters clearing the rope nearly three-times as often. Although the rate of scoring remained steady from WBBL|04 to WBBL|05, the frequency of wickets taken and sixes hit decreased, indicating a more conservative approach by both batters and bowlers. This could possibly be attributed to the tournament's shift to the start of the summer, when pitches tend to be slower and less conducive to attacking play.

The table below details the league-wide progression of batting strike rate and bowling strike rate as well as total sixes hit and centuries scored across the first eight seasons:

Statistical progression in the WBBL
Season	Bat SR	Bwl SR	6s	100s	Refs
2015–16	98	20.9	111	1	
2016–17	101	23.7	162	1	
2017–18	105	22.2	206	3	
2018–19	115	21.1	270	6	
2019–20	114	23.5	252	3	
2020–21	108	20.6	232	2	
2021–22	108	21.8	190	5	
2022–23	112	19.8	235	1	

==== Fielding ====
The 2015–16 final was noted for a poor level of fielding as both teams succumbed to the occasion's high pressure. Conversely, the "incredible" semi-finals three seasons later at Drummoyne Oval featured exciting endings determined by "miracle" catching and run out plays which drew widespread acclaim. In an opinion piece for The Sydney Morning Herald, former Australian cricketer Geoff Lawson highlighted these moments of "precision" as a sign that the league had rapidly transformed into a "serious professional sporting competition" which justified CA's investment in women's cricket.

==== Overseas players ====
The level of competition in the WBBL is enhanced by luring many of the best overseas players to Australian shores, with each team allowed up to three "marquee" signings of cricketers from other countries. South African bowler Marizanne Kapp and New Zealand all-rounder Sophie Devine are among the international signings who have been permanent fixtures in the league. However, in November 2019, after some WBBL squads had been heavily impacted by conflicting international cricket schedules—particularly teams featuring Indian and English players—newly appointed CA board member Mel Jones cited a need for greater cooperation between nations to give the league a clearer window.

==== Australian players ====
Another feature of the league is the ongoing presence of all leading Australian female players, such as Meg Lanning and Ellyse Perry. This is a stark contrast to the BBL, in which many of the top male Australian players—including David Warner and Pat Cummins—are rarely able to participate due to Test and ODI commitments. Consequently, the WBBL is seen as an optimal means of fast-tracking the development of the country's most promising young players, enabling them to gain first-hand experience from world-class teammates and opponents. Ashleigh Gardner and Sophie Molineux are two examples of teenagers performing strongly in the league before going on to earn national selection by the age of 20.

== Tournament results ==
=== Season summaries ===
Season	Edition	Champions	Most runs	Most wickets	Player of the Tournament	Young Gun award	Refs
2015–16	WBBL|01	Sydney Thunder	Meg Lanning (Melbourne Stars) – 560	Rene Farrell (Sydney Thunder) – 26	Meg Lanning (Melbourne Stars)	Lauren Cheatle (Sydney Thunder)	
2016–17	WBBL|02	Sydney Sixers	Meg Lanning (Melbourne Stars) – 503	Sarah Aley (Sydney Sixers) – 28	Beth Mooney (Brisbane Heat)	Ashleigh Gardner (Sydney Sixers)	
2017–18	WBBL|03	Sydney Sixers	Ellyse Perry (Sydney Sixers) – 552	Sarah Aley (Sydney Sixers) and Katherine Brunt (Perth Scorchers) – 23	Amy Satterthwaite (Melbourne Renegades)	Sophie Molineux (Melbourne Renegades)	
2018–19	WBBL|04	Brisbane Heat	Ellyse Perry (Sydney Sixers) – 778	Heather Graham (Perth Scorchers) and Delissa Kimmince (Brisbane Heat) – 22	Ellyse Perry (Sydney Sixers)	Georgia Wareham (Melbourne Renegades)	
2019–20	WBBL|05	Brisbane Heat	Sophie Devine (Adelaide Strikers) – 769	Molly Strano (Melbourne Renegades) – 24	Sophie Devine (Adelaide Strikers)	Hannah Darlington (Sydney Thunder)	
2020–21	WBBL|06	Sydney Thunder	Beth Mooney (Perth Scorchers) – 551	Sammy-Jo Johnson (Sydney Thunder) – 22	Sophie Devine (Perth Scorchers)	Darcie Brown (Adelaide Strikers)	
2021–22	WBBL|07	Perth Scorchers	Beth Mooney (Perth Scorchers) – 547	Amanda-Jade Wellington (Adelaide Strikers) – 23	Harmanpreet Kaur (Melbourne Renegades)	Phoebe Litchfield (Sydney Thunder)	
2022–23	WBBL|08	Adelaide Strikers	Beth Mooney (Perth Scorchers) – 434	Megan Schutt (Adelaide Strikers) – 27	Ashleigh Gardner (Sydney Sixers)	Tess Flintoff (Melbourne Stars)	
2023–24	WBBL|09	Adelaide Strikers	Beth Mooney (Perth Scorchers) – 557	Sophie Day (Melbourne Stars) – 27	Chamari Athapaththu (Sydney Thunder)	Charli Knott (Brisbane Heat)	
2024–25	WBBL|10	Melbourne Renegades	Ellyse Perry (SYS) – 424	Samantha Bates (Sydney Thunder) and Alana King (Perth Scorchers) – 20	Ellyse Perry (Sydney Sixers) and Jess Jonassen (Brisbane Heat)	Chloe Ainsworth (Perth Scorchers)	
2025–26	WBBL|11	Hobart Hurricanes	Beth Mooney (PRS) – 549	Georgia Wareham (MLR) and Ashleigh Gardner (SYS) – 19	Georgia Wareham (MLR)	Lucy Hamilton (BRH)	

=== Final summaries ===
Final	1st innings	2nd innings	Result	Player of the Final	Venue	Attendance
WBBL|01; 24 January 2016	Sydney Sixers; 7/115 (20 overs)	Sydney Thunder; 7/116 (19.3 overs)	Thunder won by 3 wickets Scorecard	Erin Osborne (Sydney Thunder)	Melbourne Cricket Ground (Note: Played as a double-header with the men's BBL final); Melbourne, VIC	N/A
WBBL|02; 28 January 2017	Sydney Sixers; 5/124 (20 overs)	Perth Scorchers; 7/117 (20 overs)	Sixers won by 7 runs Scorecard	Sarah Aley (Sydney Sixers)	WACA Ground; Perth, WA	N/A
WBBL|03; 4 February 2018	Perth Scorchers; 99 (20 overs)	Sydney Sixers; 1/100 (15 overs)	Sixers won by 9 wickets Scorecard	Sarah Coyte (Sydney Sixers)	Adelaide Oval; Adelaide, SA	N/A
WBBL|04; 26 January 2019	Sydney Sixers; 7/131 (20 overs)	Brisbane Heat; 7/132 (19.2 overs)	Heat won by 3 wickets Scorecard	Beth Mooney (Brisbane Heat)	Drummoyne Oval; Sydney, NSW	5,368
WBBL|05; 8 December 2019	Adelaide Strikers; 7/161 (20 overs)	Brisbane Heat; 4/162 (18.1 overs)	Heat won by 6 wickets Scorecard	Beth Mooney (Brisbane Heat)	Allan Border Field; Brisbane, QLD	2,700
WBBL|06; 28 November 2020	Melbourne Stars; 9/86 (20 overs)	Sydney Thunder; 3/87 (13.4 overs)	Thunder won by 7 wickets Scorecard	Shabnim Ismail (Sydney Thunder)	North Sydney Oval; Sydney, NSW	1,633
WBBL|07; 27 November 2021	Perth Scorchers; 5/146 (20 overs)	Adelaide Strikers; 6/134 (20 overs)	Scorchers won by 12 runs Scorecard	Marizanne Kapp (Perth Scorchers)	Perth Stadium; Perth, WA	15,511
WBBL|08; 26 November 2022	Adelaide Strikers; 5/147 (20 overs)	Sydney Sixers; 137 (20 overs)	Strikers won by 10 runs Scorecard	Deandra Dottin (Adelaide Strikers)	North Sydney Oval; Sydney, NSW	6,478
WBBL|09; 2 December 2023	Adelaide Strikers; 5/125 (20 overs)	Brisbane Heat; 8/122 (20 overs)	Strikers won by 3 runs Scorecard	Amanda-Jade Wellington (Adelaide Strikers)	Adelaide Oval; Adelaide, SA	12,379
WBBL|10; 1 December 2024	Melbourne Renegades; 9/141 (20 overs)	Brisbane Heat; 6/90 (12 overs)	Renegades won by 7 runs (DLS); Scorecard	Hayley Matthews (Melbourne Renegades)	Melbourne Cricket Ground; Melbourne, VIC	5,844
WBBL|11; 13 December 2025	Perth Scorchers; 5/137 (20 overs)	Hobart Hurricanes; 2/141 (15 overs)	Hurricanes won by 8 wickets Scorecard	Lizelle Lee (Hobart Hurricanes)	Bellerive Oval; Hobart, TAS	

=== Team Summary by Season ===
Team	2015–16	2016–17	2017–18	2018–19	2019–20	2020–21	2021–22	2022–23	2023–24	2024–25	2025–26
Adelaide; Strikers	7th	8th	4th (SF)	6th	2nd (RU)	6th	4th (RU)	2nd (C)	1st (C)	7th	6th
Brisbane; Heat	6th	3rd (SF)	5th	3rd (C)	1st (C)	2nd (SF)	3rd (EF)	3rd (CF)	3rd (RU)	2nd (RU)	8th
Hobart; Hurricanes	2nd (SF)	4th (SF)	8th	8th	7th	8th	6th	4th (EF)	6th	4th (KF)	1st (C)
Melbourne; Renegades	8th	7th	6th	4th (SF)	4th (SF)	7th	2nd (CF)	7th	8th	1st (C)	5th
Melbourne; Stars	5th	5th	7th	7th	8th	1st (RU)	5th	6th	7th	8th	4th (KF)
Perth; Scorchers	4th (SF)	2nd (RU)	3rd (RU)	5th	3rd (SF)	4th (SF)	1st (C)	5th	2nd (CF)	5th	3rd (RU)
Sydney; Sixers	3rd (RU)	1st (C)	1st (C)	1st (RU)	5th	5th	8th	1st (RU)	5th	6th	2nd (CF)
Sydney; Thunder	1st (C)	6th	2nd (SF)	2nd (SF)	6th	3rd (C)	7th	8th	4th (EF)	3rd (CF)	7th

Legend
C	Champions	CF	Lost the Challenger	1st	Regular season ranking
RU	Runners-up	KF	Lost the Knockout
SF	Semi-finalists	EF	Lost the Eliminator

== Statistics and Records ==
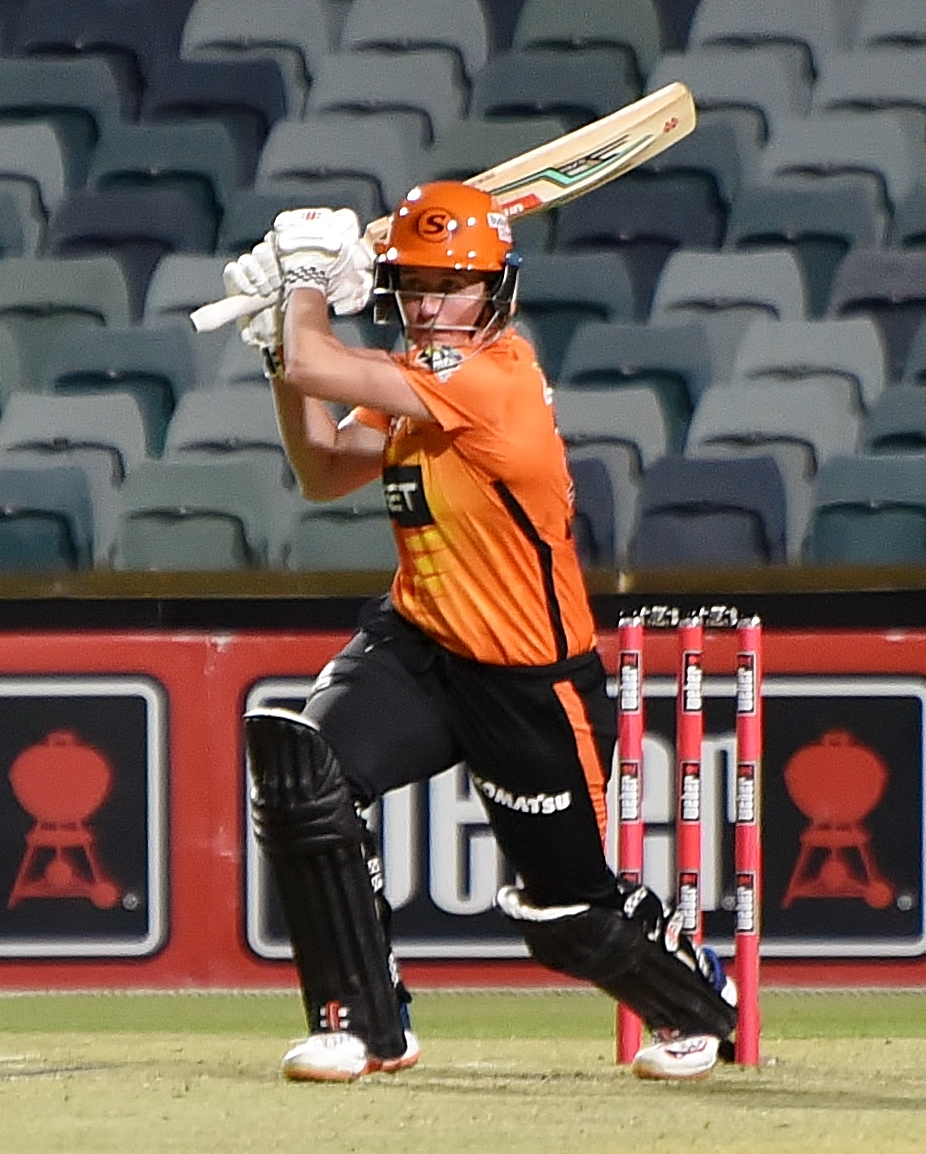
Beth Mooney currently holds the record for the most career runs scored and the most dismissals by a wicket-keeper.

Beth Mooney, who currently plays for the Perth Scorchers, holds the record of scoring most runs in the league. Jess Jonassen, who currently plays for the Brisbane Heat, has taken the most wickets of any bowler.

As of 30 December 2025

Batting records
Most runs	Beth Mooney	5,600
Highest score	Lizelle Lee	150* vs Perth Scorchers (10 November 2024)
Highest partnership	Ellyse Perry & Alyssa Healy	199* vs Melbourne Stars (3 November 2019)
Bowling records
Most wickets	Jess Jonassen	184
Best bowling figures	Megan Schutt	6/19 vs Sydney Thunder (20 November 2022)
Fielding
Most dismissals (wicket-keeper)	Beth Mooney	124
Most catches (fielder)	Ellyse Perry	67
Team records
Highest total	Sydney Sixers	4/242 (20.0) vs Melbourne Stars (9 December 2017)
Lowest total	Melbourne Stars	29 (9.3) vs Adelaide Strikers (21 October 2023)

=== Team of the Decade ===
The team of the decade was announced on 28 November 2024.

- Beth Mooney (Brisbane Heat, Perth Scorchers)
- Alyssa Healy (wk) (Sydney Sixers)
- Meg Lanning (Perth Scorchers, Melbourne Stars)
- Ellyse Perry (c) (Sydney Sixers)
- Sophie Devine (Perth Scorchers, Adelaide Strikers)
- Grace Harris (Brisbane Heat, Melbourne Renegades)
- Jess Jonassen (Brisbane Heat)
- Marizanne Kapp (Perth Scorchers, Sydney Sixers, Sydney Thunder, Melbourne Stars)
- Amanda-Jade Wellington (Adelaide Strikers)
- Sarah Aley (Sydney Sixers)
- Megan Schutt (Adelaide Strikers)
- 12th: Molly Strano (Hobart Hurricanes, Melbourne Renegades)

== See also ==
- Australian Women's Twenty20 Cup
- Women's National Cricket League
- Women's cricket in Australia
- Australia women's national cricket team
- Big Bash League
- Cricket Australia
- Women's franchise cricket
