= 2019–20 Women's National Cricket League season =

Cricket tournament

Women's National Cricket League 2019–20 season
- Dates: 22 September 2019 – 16 February 2020
- Administrator: Cricket Australia
- Cricket format: Limited overs cricket (50 overs)
- Tournament format(s): Round-robin and final
- Champions: Western Australia (1st title)
- Runners-up: New South Wales
- Participants: 7
- Matches: 29
- Player of the series: (Western Australia) Nicole Bolton
- Most runs: (Western Australia) Nicole Bolton (436)
- Most wickets: (New South Wales) Rene Farrell (21)
- Official website: cricket.com.au

The 2019–20 Women's National Cricket League season was the 24th season of the Women's National Cricket League (WNCL), the women's domestic limited overs cricket competition in Australia. Under an expanded schedule, each of the seven teams played eight round robin games, up from the six played by all teams in each of the previous nine seasons. The tournament started on 22 September 2019 and finished on 16 February 2020. Defending champions New South Wales Breakers topped the ladder and met Western Australia in the final, where the latter won by 42 runs to secure their first WNCL title.

== Ladder ==
As of 9 February 2020

Pos	Team	Pld	W	L	T	NR	BP	Pts	NRR
1	New South Wales	8	6	2	0	0	2	26	0.441
2	Western Australia	8	6	2	0	0	1	25	0.198
3	Queensland	8	4	3	0	1	5	22	0.561
4	Victoria	8	4	4	0	0	1	17	0.170
5	Australian Capital Territory	8	4	4	0	0	0	16	−0.560
6	Tasmania	8	2	6	0	0	1	9	−0.299
7	South Australia (Note: One point deducted for slow over rate)	8	1	6	0	1	0	5	−0.561

Updated to match(es) played on 9 February 2020. Source:
Rules for classification: The top two ranked teams qualified for the final.
- Points system: 4 for a win, 2 each for a tie or a no result, 0 for a loss, 1 each for an abandoned match.
- Bonus point system: 2 for win with a run rate twice that of the opposition, 1 for win with a run rate 1.25 times that of the opposition.
  Notes:

== Fixtures ==
=== Round 1 ===
Match 1
21 September 2019
10:00
Scorecard

Queensland; 189 (47 overs)	v	Western Australia; 5/191 (43.1 overs)
Jemma Barsby 63 (70); Sophie Devine 3/35 (8 overs)		Nicole Bolton 77 (106); Sammy-Jo Johnson 3/44 (10 overs)

Western Australia won by 5 wickets (with 29 balls remaining)
Souths District Cricket Club, Brisbane
Umpires: D Taylor and S Farrell
Player of the match: Nicole Bolton (Western Australia)

- Western Australia won the toss and elected to field.
- Points: Western Australia 4, Queensland 0

Match 2
22 September 2019
10:00
Scorecard

South Australia; 8/195 (37 overs)	v	New South Wales; 4/196 (36.1 overs)
Bridget Patterson 78* (99); Rachel Trenaman 2/16 (3 overs)		Tahlia Wilson 95* (111); Tahlia McGrath 1/36 (8 overs)

New South Wales won by 6 wickets (with 5 balls remaining)
Karen Rolton Oval, Adelaide
Umpires: H Singh and C Thomas
Player of the match: Tahlia Wilson (NSW Breakers)

- South Australia won the toss and elected to bat.
- Match was reduced to 37 overs per side
- Points: NSW 4, South Australia 0

Match 3
22 September 2019
10:00
Scorecard

Australian Capital Territory; 6/168 (33 overs)	v	Victoria; 4/150 (33 overs)
Katie Mack 63 (81); Molly Strano 1/27 (6 overs)		Makinley Blows 48 (76); Madeline Penna 1/24 (7 overs)

Australian Capital Territory won by 18 runs
Park 25, Adelaide
Umpires: E Sheridan and S Craig
Player of the match: Katie Mack (ACT Meteors)

- Victoria won the toss and elected to field.
- Match was reduced to 33 overs per side
- Points: ACT 4, Victoria 0

Match 4
22 September 2019
09:30
Scorecard

Western Australia; 194 (49 overs)	v	Tasmania; 178 (44 overs)
Nicole Bolton 63 (70); Belinda Vakarewa 3/27 (10 overs)		Corinne Hall 55 (93); Nicole Bolton 2/26 (10 overs)

Western Australia won by 16 runs
Souths District Cricket Club, Brisbane
Umpires: D Taylor and S Dionysius
Player of the match: Nicole Bolton (Western Australia)

- Tasmania won the toss and elected to field.
- Points: Western Australia 4, Tasmania 0

Match 5
23 September 2019
10:00
Scorecard

Queensland; 240 (49.5 overs)	v	Tasmania; 139 (40.2 overs)
Laura Harris 51 (30); Sasha Maloney 4/37 (7.5 overs)		Brooke Hepburn 25 (48); Georgia Prestwidge 4/41 (10 overs)

Queensland won by 101 runs
Souths District Cricket Club, Brisbane
Umpires: S Farrell and S Dionysius
Player of the match: Grace Harris (Queensland)

- Queensland won the toss and elected to bat.
- Points: Queensland 5, Tasmania 0

Match 6
24 September 2019
10:00
Scorecard

South Australia; 203 (48.4 overs)	v	Australian Capital Territory; 7/204 (47.2 overs)
Bridget Patterson 81 (123); Amy Yates 6/33 (10 overs)		Katie Mack 83 (125); Samantha Betts 2/36 (9 overs)

Australian Capital Territory won by 3 wickets (with 16 balls remaining)
Karen Rolton Oval, Adelaide
Umpires: H Singh and D Bhatt
Player of the match: Amy Yates (ACT)

- South Australia won the toss and elected to bat.
- Points: ACT 4, South Australia 0

Match 7
24 September 2019
10:00
Scorecard

New South Wales; 186 (49.3 overs)	v	Victoria; 3/188 (44.3 overs)
Naomi Stalenberg 53 (80); Annabel Sutherland 3/27 (9 overs)		Makinley Blows 105 (134); Rene Farrell 2/35 (10 overs)

Victoria won by 7 wickets (with 33 balls remaining)
Park 25, Adelaide
Umpires: E Sheridan and C Thomas
Player of the match: Makinley Blows (Victoria)

- New South Wales won the toss and elected to bat.
- Points: Victoria 4, NSW 0

=== Round 2 ===
Match 8
14 January 2020
10:00
Scorecard

Australian Capital Territory; 177 (49.2 overs)	v	New South Wales (home team); 6/179 (48 overs)
Erin Osborne 55 (99); Rene Farrell 3/12 (7.2 overs)		Phoebe Litchfield 82* (119); Maitlan Brown 1/14 (3 overs)

New South Wales won by 4 wickets (with 12 balls remaining)
Hurstville Oval, Sydney
Umpires: Keiran Knight and Sharad Patel
Player of the match: Phoebe Litchfield (New South Wales)

- New South Wales won the toss and elected to field.
- Points: New South Wales 4, Australian Capital Territory 0.
- Match delayed from 6 January 2020 due to bushfires.

Match 9
7 January 2020
10:00
Scorecard

(home team) Victoria; 7/259 (50 overs)	v	Western Australia; 142 (40.5 overs)
Elyse Villani 99 (127); Emma King 3/46 (8 overs)		Chloe Piparo 60 (76); Annabel Sutherland 3/21 (8 overs)

Victoria won by 117 runs
Junction Oval, Melbourne
Umpires: Dale Ireland and Lisa McCabe
Player of the match: Elyse Villani (Victoria)

- Western Australia won the toss and elected to field.
- Points: Victoria 5, Western Australia 0.

Match 10
7 January 2020
10:00
Scorecard

Australian Capital Territory; 151 (45 overs)	v	Queensland; 5/157 (24.1 overs)
Erin Osborne 37 (61); Jemma Barsby 2/23 (6 overs)		Jess Jonassen 45 (51); Amy Yates 1/16 (4 overs)

Queensland won by 5 wickets (with 155 balls remaining)
Blacktown International Sportspark, Sydney
Umpires: Keiran Knight and Bede Sajowitz
Player of the match: Sammy-Jo Johnson (Queensland)

- Queensland won the toss and elected to field.
- Points: Queensland 6, Australian Capital Territory 0.

Match 11
7 January 2020
10:00
Scorecard

(home team) South Australia; 172 (46 overs)	v	Tasmania; 5/172 (39.2 overs)
Bridget Patterson 41 (72); Meg Phillips 3/17 (7 overs)		Nicola Carey 64 (91); Megan Schutt 3/21 (10 overs)

Tasmania won by 5 wickets (with 72 balls remaining)
Karen Rolton Oval, Adelaide
Umpires: Harry Singh and Eloise Sheridan
Player of the match: Nicola Carey (Tasmania)

- South Australia won the toss and elected to bat.
- Points: Tasmania 5, South Australia 0.

Match 12
9 January 2020
10:00
Scorecard

Western Australia; 6/271 (50 overs)	v	Victoria (home team); 8/246 (50 overs)
Sophie Devine 109 (102); Sophie Molineux 2/40 (10 overs)		Annabel Sutherland 57 (74); Taneale Peschel 3/40 (10 overs)

Western Australia won by 25 runs
Junction Oval, Melbourne
Umpires: Dale Ireland and Lisa McCabe
Player of the match: Sophie Devine (Western Australia)

- Western Australia won the toss and elected to bat.
- Points: Western Australia 4, Victoria 0.

Match 13
9 January 2020
10:00
Scorecard

(home team) New South Wales; 7/241 (50 overs)	v	Queensland; 154 (35.4 overs)
Alyssa Healy 53 (61); Jess Jonassen 3/47 (10 overs)		Laura Harris 65 (53); Hayley Silver-Holmes 3/18 (8 overs)

New South Wales won by 87 runs
Hurstville Oval, Sydney
Umpires: Keiran Knight and Sharad Patel
Player of the match: Hayley Silver-Holmes (New South Wales)

- Queensland won the toss and elected to field.
- Points: New South Wales 5, Queensland 0.

Match 14
9 January 2020
10:00
Scorecard

(home team) South Australia; 7/242 (50 overs)	v	South Australia; 6/243 (49 overs)
Samantha Betts 59 (49); Samantha Bates 2/42 (10 overs)		Corinne Hall 68 (57); Megan Schutt 4/33 (10 overs)

Queensland won by 4 wickets (with 6 balls remaining)
Karen Rolton Oval, Adelaide
Umpires: Craig Thomas and Mary Waldron
Player of the match: Corinne Hall (Tasmania)

- South Australia won the toss and elected to bat.
- Points: Tasmania 4, South Australia 0.

=== Round 3 ===
Match 15
21 January 2020
10:00
Scorecard

(home team) Tasmania; 198 (49.5 overs)	v	Victoria; 5/202 (46 overs)
Nicola Carey 73 (86); Molly Strano 2/36 (10 overs)		Sophie Molineux 80 (106); Meg Phillips 3/26 (6 overs)

Victoria won by 5 wickets (with 24 balls remaining)
TCA Ground, Hobart
Umpires: Muhammad Qureshi and Jeremiah Matibiri
Player of the match: Sophie Molineux (Victoria)

- Victoria won the toss and elected to field.
- Points: Victoria 4, Tasmania 0.

Match 16
21 January 2020
10:00
Scorecard

Queensland; 179 (48.3 overs)	v	Australian Capital Territory (home team); 119 (33.2 overs)
Jemma Barsby 31* (69); Rene Farrell 3/12 (7.2 overs)		Claire Koski 44 (67); Holly Ferling 3/28 (10 overs)

Queensland won by 60 runs
Manuka Oval, Canberra
Umpires: Andrew Scotford and Andrew Crozier
Player of the match: Holly Ferling (Queensland)

- Queensland won the toss and elected to bat.
- Points: Queensland 5, Australian Capital Territory 0.

Match 17
21 January 2020
10:00
Scorecard

(home team) Western Australia; 9/259 (50 overs)	v	South Australia; 157 (40.3 overs)
Nicole Bolton 94 (89); Amanda-Jade Wellington 4/31 (10 overs)		Amanda-Jade Wellington 32 (38); Nicole Bolton 3/26 (6 overs)

Western Australia won by 102 runs
WACA Ground, Perth
Umpires: Dean Trigg and J. Paterson
Player of the match: Nicole Bolton (Western Australia)

- South Australia won the toss and elected to field.
- Points: Western Australia 5, South Australia 0.

Match 18
22 January 2020
10:00
Scorecard

New South Wales; 248 (46.5 overs)	v	Queensland; 225 (47.2 overs)
Ashleigh Gardner 136 (108); Jess Jonassen 2/30 (8 overs)		Kirby Short 54 (68); Ashleigh Gardner 3/37 (10 overs)

New South Wales won by 23 runs
Manuka Oval, Canberra
Umpires: Andrew Scotford and Chris Cassin
Player of the match: Ashleigh Gardner (New South Wales)

- New South Wales won the toss and elected to bat.
- Points: New South Wales 4, Queensland 0.

Match 19
22 January 2020
10:00
Scorecard

(home team) Tasmania; 7/197 (43/43 overs)	v	Victoria; 2/65 (17/17 overs, target 64)
Maisy Gibson 57* (40); Ellyse Perry 3/17 (9 overs)		Elyse Villani 30* (48); Samantha Bates 2/14 (5 overs)

Victoria won by 2 runs (D/L method)
TCA Ground, Hobart
Umpires: Muhammad Qureshi and Jerry Matibiri
Player of the match: Ellyse Perry (Victoria)

- Victoria won the toss and elected to field.
- Points: Victoria 4, Tasmania 0.

Match 20
23 January 2020
10:00
Scorecard

(home team) Australian Capital Territory; 187 (46.1 overs)	v	New South Wales; 3/189 (32.2 overs)
Carly Leeson 56 (63); Rene Farrell 3/20 (10 overs)		Tahlia Wilson 64* (71); Carly Leeson 1/20 (3 overs)

New South Wales won by 7 wickets (with 106 balls remaining)
Manuka Oval, Canberra
Umpires: Andrew Scotford and Andrew Crozier
Player of the match: Tahlia Wilson (New South Wales)

- New South Wales won the toss and elected to field.
- Points: New South Wales 5, Australian Capital Territory 0.

Match 21
23 January 2020
10:00
Scorecard

(home team) Western Australia; 9/251 (50 overs)	v	South Australia; 238 (48.2 overs)
Chloe Piparo 76 (112); Megan Schutt 3/35 (10 overs)		Tahlia McGrath 93 (87); Emma King 3/35 (10 overs)

Western Australia won by 13 runs
WACA Ground, Perth
Umpires: Dean Trigg and Trent Steenholdt
Player of the match: Tahlia McGrath (South Australia)

- Western Australia won the toss and elected to bat.
- Points: Western Australia 4, South Australia 0.

=== Round 4 ===
Match 22
4 February 2020
10:00
Scorecard

Tasmania; 200 (46.4 overs)	v	New South Wales (home team); 9/204 (50 overs)
Sasha Moloney 59 (99); Stella Campbell 2/17 (6 overs)		Lisa Griffith 65 (105); Belinda Vakarewa 3/29 (10 overs)

New South Wales won by 1 wicket (with 0 balls remaining)
North Sydney Oval, Sydney
Umpires: Keiran Knight and Bede Sajowitz
Player of the match: Lisa Griffith (New South Wales)

- Tasmania won the toss and elected to bat.
- Points: New South Wales 4, Tasmania 0.

Match 23
4 February 2020
10:00
Scorecard

Western Australia; 7/240 (50 overs)	v	Australian Capital Territory (home team); 8/242 (47.5 overs)
Mathilda Carmichael 84* (112); Sarah Cady 3/33 (10 overs)		Katie Mack 72 (97); Heather Graham 4/35 (10 overs)

Australian Capital Territory won by 2 wickets (with 13 balls remaining)
Phillip Oval, Canberra
Umpires: Andrew Scotford and Chris Cassin
Player of the match: Katie Mack (Australian Capital Territory)

- Australian Capital Territory won the toss and elected to field.
- Points: Australian Capital Territory 4, Western Australia 0.

Match 24
4 February 2020
10:00
Scorecard

Victoria; 181 (50 overs)	v	Queensland (home team); 4/183 (37.1 overs)
Elyse Villani 55 (72); Grace Harris 3/28 (10 overs)		Grace Harris 53* (52); Makinley Blows 2/49 (7.1 overs)

Queensland won by 6 wickets (with 77 balls remaining)
Allan Border Field, Brisbane
Umpires: Steven Farrell and N James
Player of the match: Grace Harris (Queensland)

- Queensland won the toss and elected to field.
- Points: Queensland 5, Victoria 0.

Match 25
5 February 2020
10:00
Scorecard

Victoria; 191 (50 overs)	v	South Australia; 7/195 (49 overs)
Amy Vine 56 (121); Ellie Falconer 4/36 (8 overs)		Amanda-Jade Wellington 60* (54); Molly Strano 2/24 (10 overs)

South Australia won by 3 wickets (with 6 balls remaining)
Allan Border Field, Brisbane
Umpires: N James and Stephen Dionysius
Player of the match: Amanda-Jade Wellington (South Australia)

- South Australia won the toss and elected to field.
- Points: South Australia 4, Victoria 0.

Match 26
6 February 2020
10:00
Scorecard

(home team) New South Wales; 6/223 (50 overs)	v	Western Australia; 6/227 (46.5 overs)
Naomi Stalenberg 86 (111); Piepa Cleary 3/52 (10 overs)		Megan Banting 57* (52); Rene Farrell 3/25 (8.5 overs)

Western Australia won by 7 wickets (with 106 balls remaining)
North Sydney Oval, Sydney
Umpires: Bede Sajowitz and Sharad Patel
Player of the match: Nicole Bolton (Western Australia)

- Western Australia won the toss and elected to field.
- Points: Western Australia 4, New South Wales 0.

Match 27
6 February 2020
10:00
Scorecard

Tasmania; 198 (47.4 overs)	v	Australian Capital Territory (home team); 7/202 (46.3 overs)
Emma Thompson 70 (116); Maitlan Brown 2/31 (8.4 overs)		Sarah Cady 48* (60); Belinda Vakarewa 3/35 (10 overs)

Australian Capital Territory won by 3 wickets (with 21 balls remaining)
Phillip Oval, Canberra
Umpires: Andrew Scotford and Andrew Crozier
Player of the match: Sarah Cady (Australian Capital Territory)

- Australian Capital Territory won the toss and elected to field.
- Points: Australian Capital Territory 4, Tasmania 0.

Match 28
6 February 2020
10:00
Scorecard

(home team) Queensland	v	South Australia

Match abandoned without a ball bowled
Allan Border Field, Brisbane
Umpires: S Farrell and Stephen Dionysius

- No toss.
- Points: Queensland 2, South Australia 0.

== Final ==
Final
16 February 2020
10:00
Scorecard

Western Australia; 231 (50 overs)	v	New South Wales (home team); 189 (49.5 overs)
Nicole Bolton 67 (107); Rene Farrell 4/33 (10 overs)		Rachel Trenaman 37 (41); Emma King 3/28 (10 overs)

Western Australia won by 42 runs
North Sydney Oval, North Sydney
Umpires: Troy Penman and Ben Treloar
Player of the match: Nicole Bolton (WA)

- Western Australia won the toss and elected to bat.
- Western Australia won the 2019–20 Women's National Cricket League.

== Statistics ==
=== Highest totals ===
Team	Score	Against	Venue	Date
Western Australia	6/271	Victoria	Junction Oval	9 January 2020
Victoria	7/259	Western Australia	Junction Oval	7 January 2020
Western Australia	9/259	South Australia	WACA Ground	21 January 2020
Western Australia	9/251	South Australia	WACA Ground	23 January 2020
New South Wales	248	Queensland	Manuka Oval	22 January 2020

=== Most runs ===
Player	Team	Mat	Inns	NO	Runs	HS	Ave	BF	SR	100	50
Nicole Bolton	Western Australia	9	9	0	436	94	48.44	585	74.52	0	5
Chloe Piparo	Western Australia	9	9	0	365	76	40.55	514	71.01	0	4
Elyse Villani	Victoria	8	8	1	300	99	42.85	406	73.89	0	2
Katie Mack	Australian Capital Territory	8	8	0	295	83	36.87	463	67.71	0	3
Bridget Patterson	South Australia	7	7	1	288	81	48.00	437	65.90	0	2

=== Most wickets ===
Player	Team	Mat	Inns	Overs	Mdns	Runs	Wkts	BBI	Ave	SR	4WI
Rene Farrell	New South Wales	9	9	75.1	13	275	21	4/33	13.09	21.4	1
Emma King	Western Australia	9	9	79.0	7	326	18	3/28	18.11	26.3	0
Nicole Bolton	Western Australia	9	9	79.0	4	311	16	3/26	19.43	29.6	0
Tahlia McGrath	South Australia	7	7	62.2	3	278	13	4/40	21.38	28.7	1
Hayley Silver-Holmes	New South Wales	9	9	60.1	5	240	12	3/18	20.00	30.0	0
