= Barsby (surname) =

Barsby is an English toponymic surname. The surname derives from the village of Barsby in Leicestershire, England. Notable people with the surname include:

- Corey Barsby (born 1992), Australian cricketer
- Jemma Barsby (born 1995), Australian cricketer
- Tina Barsby (fl. 1980s–2010s), British plant geneticist
- Trevor Barsby (born 1964), Australian cricketer
