= Gaddesby Hall =

Coordinates: 52.71132°N 0.98104°W

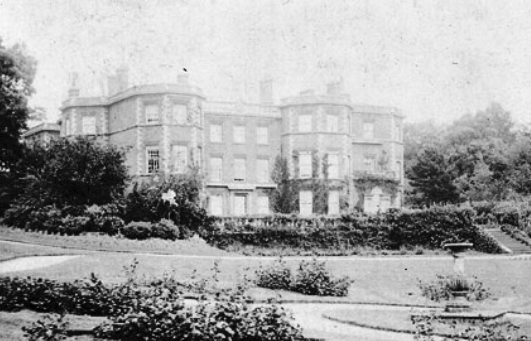
Gaddesby Hall c.1870

Gaddesby Hall is an 18th-century brick-built house in the village of Gaddesby, Leicestershire. It was built in the late 1740s as a three-storey house with additions of 1868. It is a Grade II listed building.

It was built on the site of an earlier house called Paske Hall which was surrounded by a moat and dated back to 1398. In 1534 it was home of Everard Palmer and the estate extended to 72 acres. Everard died in 1558 and the estate passed to his grandson Everard Howet who died in 1576. ~In 1598 it was bought by William Nedham of Peterborough who acquired adjacent land extending the estate to 230 acres. He died in 1600 leaving the estate to 7 year old Francis Nedham. Francis died in 1656 leaving the hall to his son, also Francis, who died in 1692. Next George Nedham died childless in 1738. His widow Elisabeth Penrice died in 1741.

This old hall was pulled down in 1744, having been bought by John Ayre, High Sheriff for Leicester. He built a new hall and died in 1758. In 1807 it was owned by Anne Ayre, widow of John Ayre living there with her daughters Mary and Eliza. In 1811 Eliza married hero of Waterloo, Captain Edward Cheney but died in childbirth in 1818. Cheney died in 1848 and left the estate to his only surviving son, Edward Henshaw Cheney who died in 1889.

Although Edward Cheney was buried with his wife in Gaddesby Parish Church an impressive monument by Joseph Gott originally stood in the conservatory of the hall. This was moved to the grave in 1917.

The estate was put up for sale in 1917, at which time the celebrated statue of Colonel Cheney was moved into St Luke's. In the early twentieth century it was the country house of Maurice de Forest.

After suffering neglect and from its use by the American Armed Forces during the Second World War, in 1950 the wings and top storey were demolished and the house was remodelled by C. E. Ogden.
