= Edward Cheney =

British Army officer

Edward Cheney CB
- Born: 4 November 1778; Derbyshire, England
- Died: 3 March 1848 (aged 69); Gaddesby Hall, Leicestershire, England
- Spouse: Elizabeth Ayre (m. 1811–1818)
- Military career
- Allegiance: United Kingdom
- Branch: British Army
- Service years: 1794–1818
- Rank: Colonel
- Unit: 2nd Dragoons
- Conflicts: French Revolutionary Wars; Flanders Campaign (WIA); Napoleonic Wars; Hundred Days; Battle of Waterloo

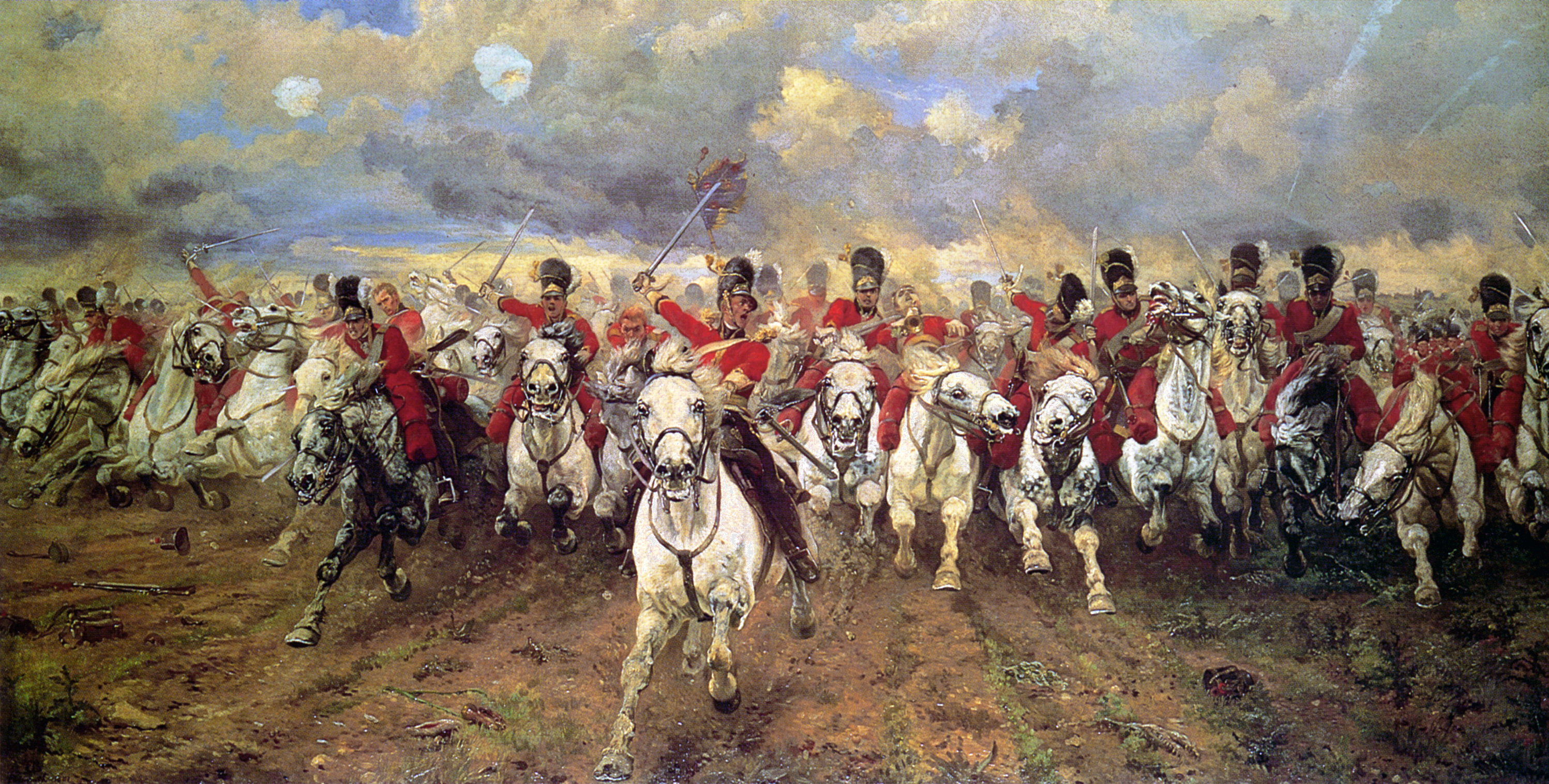
Scotland Forever! by Lady Butler with Cheney thought to be the central figure leading the charge.

Colonel Edward Hawkins Cheney CB (4 November 1778 – 3 March 1848) was a British Army officer who became known as a hero of the Battle of Waterloo. His unique claim to fame was that he had five separate horses killed or wounded under him during the battle. His grave is said to be the only equestrian statue within a British church and is probably the only statue showing a dying horse in Britain.

== Life ==
Edward Hawkins Cheney was born in Derbyshire on 4 November 1778 the second son of Robert Cheney of Meynell Langley. He joined the 2nd Dragoons at the rank of cornet in 1794, serving in Holland under the Duke of York and was severely wounded during the Flanders Campaign. He was promoted to captain in 1803 and Brevet Major in 1812.

By 1815 Cheney was in the 2nd Dragoons -commonly referred to by their prior name, The Royal Scots Greys- under the command of Lieutenant-Colonel James Inglis Hamilton, who in turn reported to Maj Gen. William Ponsonby KCB in the so-called Union Brigade, because it consisted of regiments from England (Royal Dragoons), Ireland (6th Dragoons), and Scotland (Greys).

=== Waterloo ===
At the Battle of Waterloo on 18 June 1815, the Union Brigade formed part of an echelon and were placed to primarily oppose Marcognet's 3rd Division troops. The net impact was 5000 French casualties and 2000 prisoners, a pivotal impact on the battle overall. The capture of two French eagles, including one by Ensign Ewart, formed part of the action overall.

Just after 1:30pm, with the French infantry advancing and threatening to break the British centre, The Earl of Uxbridge ordered the Household Brigade and the Union Brigades to attack the French infantry of D'Erlon's I Corps. Lt Col Hamilton witnessed the 92nd Highlanders Regiment beginning to falter and on his own initiative, ordered the Scots Greys forward at the walk because the ground was broken and uneven. The arrival of the Scots Greys helped to rally the 92nd Highlanders, who turned to attack the French. Lt.Col. Hamilton led a second charge on the French artillery accompanied by only around 50 of the Scots Greys. Hamilton and most of the group were killed in action as was Gen Ponsonby soon after.

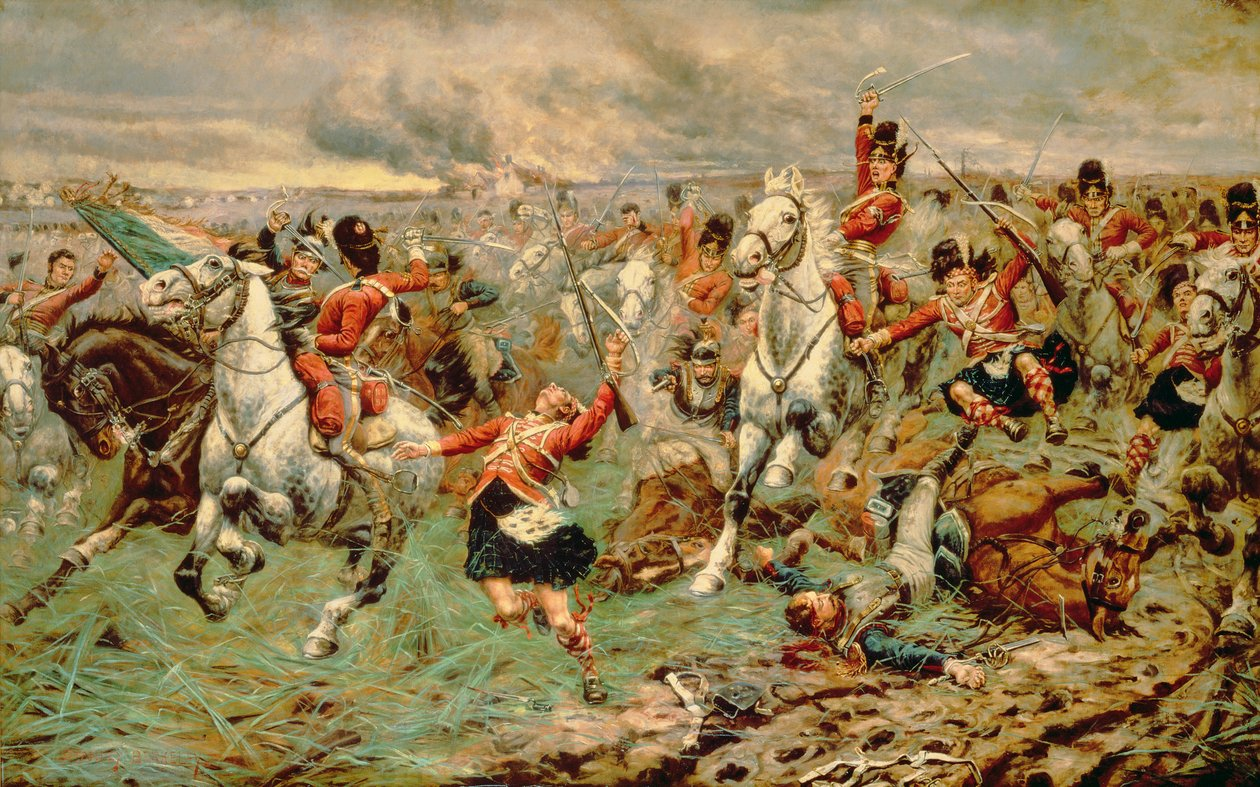
The legendary charge of the Scots Greys to relive Gordon's 92nd Highlanders

Cheney soon given a battlefield promotion to command of the Scots Greys. At this stage, Cheney had been in at least two charges, and each time had lost his horse from under him. Now in command, he led at least three further charges and had two further horses killed under him, the fifth horse being badly wounded.

He was in executive charge of the brigade for three hours during the height of the battle and led them from the front. Although still technically only a captain, he was given the in-field rank of Brevet Lt Colonel.

The successful actions of the Scots Greys, though costly in terms of lives, is seen as one of the critical turning points of the battle, and Cheney is at least partly accountable for this success. He coordinated the joint attack of the Scots Greys in support of the Gordon Highlanders, a predominantly Scottish attack.

=== Retirement & Death ===
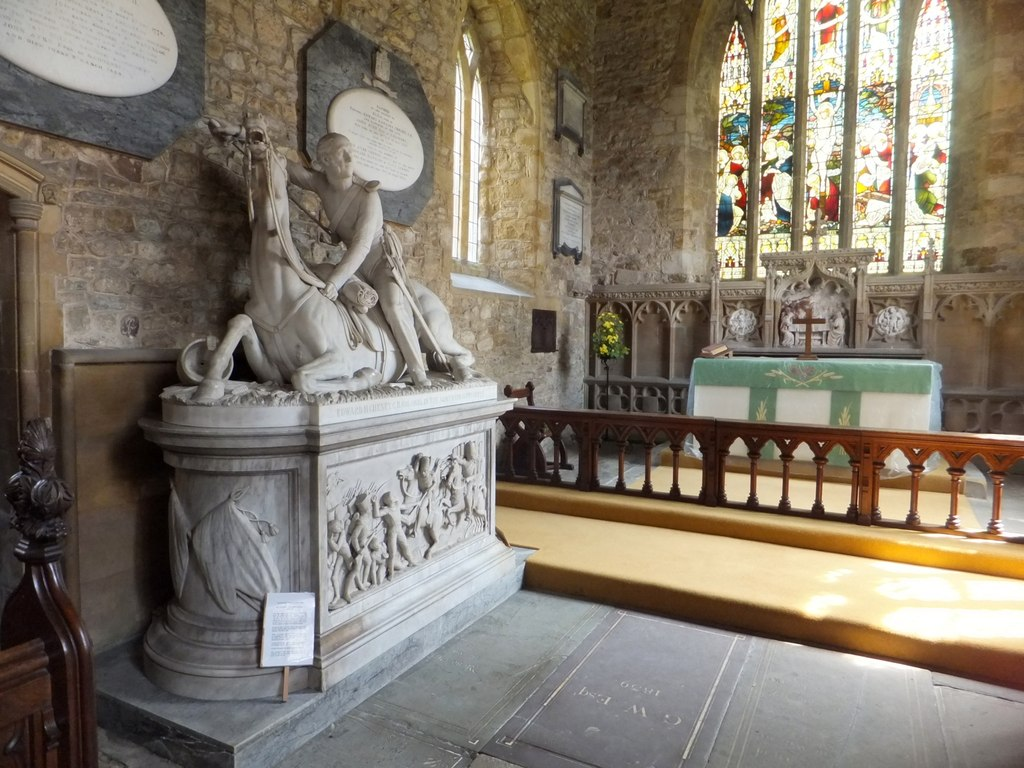
The tomb of Edward Cheney in Gaddesby

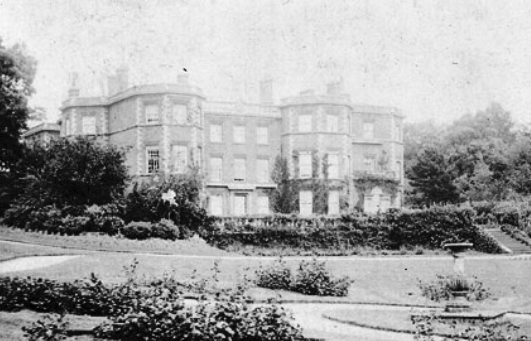
Gaddesby Hall c.1870

He retired on half pay in 1818 following the death of his wife (which broke his spirit). He inherited Gaddesby Hall near Melton Mowbray on the death of his father-in-law John Ayre. He died at Gaddesby Hall on 3 March 1848.

He is buried in Gaddesby Parish Church (St Luke's) with his wife. A magnificent tomb depicts his moment of glory where the fifth horse falls below him, shot through the neck. Low relief panels on the sarcophagus base show Ensign Ewart capturing the French regimental standard, the other significant event in the same action. The tomb was sculpted by Joseph Gott.

The monument, in pale grey marble, is well suited to portray the horse. It is listed at Grade 1 as part of the church. The monument was originally not at the grave, but was moved to the church from the conservatory of Gaddesby Hall in 1917. Nicholas Pevsner described the monument as "more suited to St Paul's Cathedral than to a small village church".

The teeth of the horse have been stained brown through a long-running habit of placing an apple in its mouth at each Harvest Thanksgiving in the church.

== Family ==
In 1811 he married Elizabeth (Eliza) Ayre, youngest daughter of John Ayre of Gaddesby Hall. Eliza died in childbirth in May 1818 giving birth to their second son (who did not survive). She was only 32 years old.

They had two sons: Edward Henshaw Cheney (1814-1889) and John Ayre Cheney who died in infancy in 1818. Edward paid for the restoration of the chancel in Gaddesby Parish Church in 1859. Edward was made Sheriff of Leicester in 1886.

== Other Recognition ==
Cheney's Waterloo Medal was acquired by the Regimental Museum of the Royal Scots Greys and is now held at Edinburgh Castle.

The Cheney Arms Inn, a public house in the village of Gaddesby, is named after Cheney.
