= Darren Lehmann =

Australian cricketer and coach (born 1970)

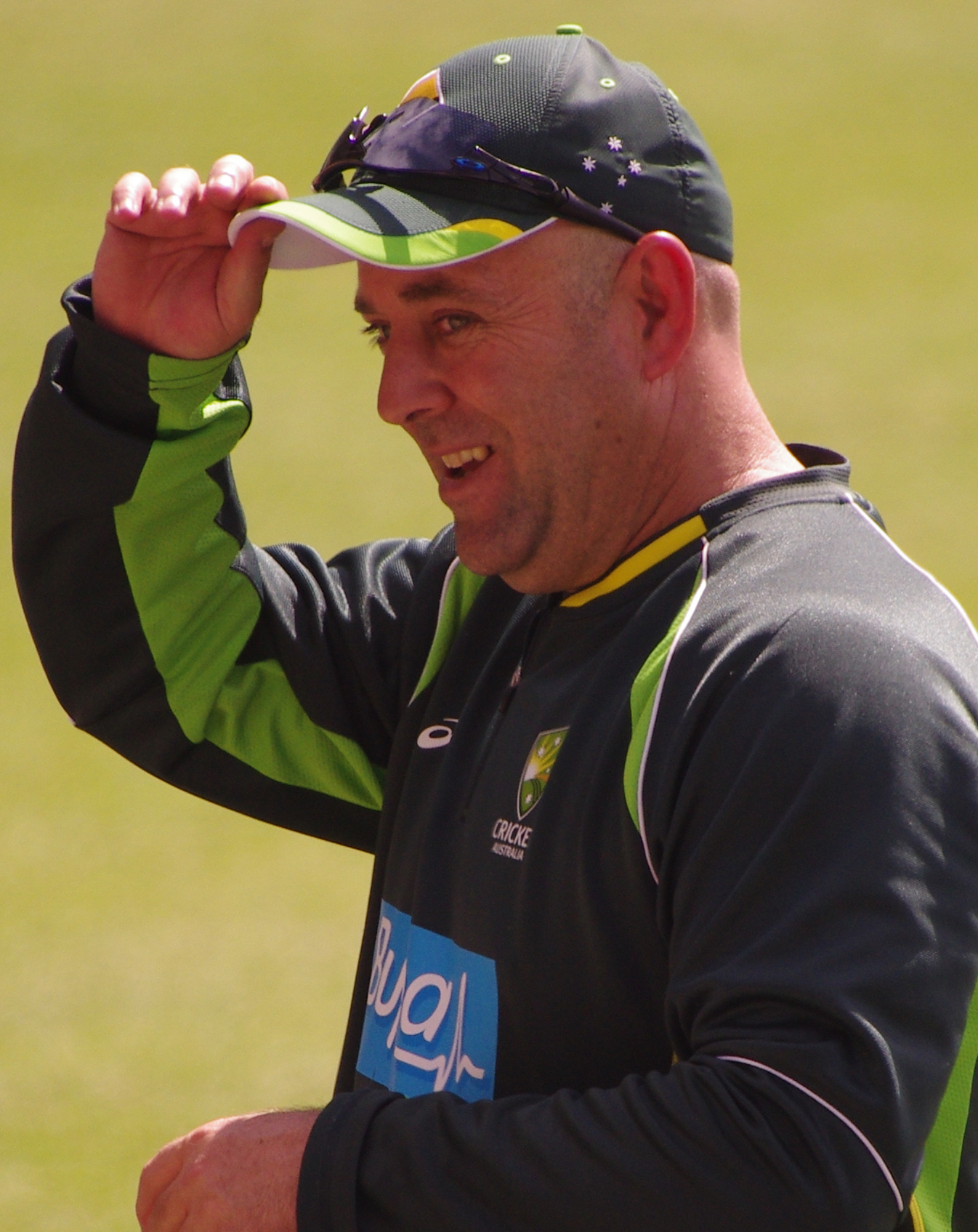
- Lehmann in January 2014

Personal information
- Full name: Darren Scott Lehmann
- Born: 5 February 1970 (age 56); Gawler, South Australia
- Nickname: Boof
- Height: 5 ft 9 in (1.75 m)
- Batting: Left-handed
- Bowling: Slow left arm orthodox
- Role: Top-order batter
- Relatives: Jake Lehmann (son); Craig White (brother-in-law)

International information
- National side: Australia (1996–2005)
- Test debut (cap 378): 25 March 1998 v India
- Last Test: 26 December 2004 v Pakistan
- ODI debut (cap 128): 30 August 1996 v Sri Lanka
- Last ODI: 6 February 2005 v Pakistan
- ODI shirt no.: 25

Domestic team information
- Years: Team
- 1987/88–1989/90: South Australia
- 1990/91–1992/93: Victoria
- 1993/94–2007/08: South Australia
- 1997–2006: Yorkshire
- 2008: Rajasthan Royals

Head coaching information
- Years: Team
- 2009–2012: Deccan Chargers
- 2011–2013: Queensland
- 2011–2013: Brisbane Heat
- 2013: Kings XI Punjab
- 2013–2018: Australia
- 2019–2021: Brisbane Heat
- 2025–present: Northamptonshire

Career statistics
Competition	Test	ODI	FC	LA
Matches	27	117	284	367
Runs scored	1,798	3,078	25,795	13,122
Batting average	44.95	38.96	57.83	46.86
100s/50s	5/10	4/17	82/111	19/94
Top score	177	119	339	191
Balls bowled	974	1,793	9,458	6,371
Wickets	15	52	130	172
Bowling average	27.46	27.78	34.92	27.71
5 wickets in innings	0	0	0	0
10 wickets in match	0	0	0	0
Best bowling	3/42	4/7	4/35	4/7
Catches/stumpings	11/–	26/–	143/–	109/–
Medal record
Men's Cricket
Representing Australia
ICC Cricket World Cup
Winner	1999 England-Wales -Ireland-Scotland-Netherlands
Winner	2003 South Africa-Zimbabwe-Kenya
Commonwealth Games
Silver medal – second place	1998 Kuala Lumpur
Representing Australia as Head Coach
ICC Cricket World Cup
Winner	2015 Australia and New Zealand
- Source: ESPNcricinfo, 12 June 2017

Darren Scott Lehmann (born 5 February 1970) is an Australian cricket coach and former cricketer who coached the Australian national team. He is currently head coach at Northamptonshire County Cricket Club. Lehmann made his ODI debut in 1996 and Test debut in 1998. He was on the fringes of national selection for the entirety of the 1990s, and only became a regular in the ODI team in 2001 and Test team in late 2002, before being dropped in early 2005. Primarily an aggressive left-handed batsman, Lehmann was also a part-time left arm orthodox bowler, and gained renown for his disregard for physical fitness and modern dietary regimes. He announced his retirement from first-class cricket in November 2007. Lehmann was a member of the Australian team that won the 1999 Cricket World Cup and the 2003 Cricket World Cup, where in the 1999 final, he scored the winning boundary, and took the winning catch in the 2003 final.

During his time coaching Australia, he led the team to be the winners of the 2015 Cricket World Cup. He also coached the IPL teams Deccan Chargers from 2009 to 2012 and Kings XI Punjab in 2013. He also coached Queensland during the 2010/11 KFC Twenty20 Big Bash, in place of Trevor Barsby who had resigned. In June 2013, Lehmann replaced Mickey Arthur as the coach of the Australian cricket team, only two weeks before the 2013 Ashes series. Although Australia lost that series 3-nil, Lehmann went on to coach the side to a 5-nil victory in the 2013–14 series less than five months later.

Lehmann stepped down as head coach after the fourth test match against South Africa in March 2018, following the ball tampering scandal which occurred during the match. He was originally thought to have been involved in the scandal, however Cricket Australia cleared him of blame at the conclusion of their investigation.

== Early years ==
Of German-Australian descent, Lehmann was a junior representative for South Australian National Football League (SANFL) club Central District as well as playing cricket. Lehmann left school at the age of 16 to work on the assembly line of Holden car manufacturers in Elizabeth, South Australia. He declined selection to the first intake of the newly formed Australian Cricket Academy, a full-time cricket centre, citing his enjoyment of the factory life. Lehmann entered the first-class scene as a 17-year-old in the 1987/88 season for South Australia, playing one match against Victoria at the Melbourne Cricket Ground after both Tim May and Peter Sleep were called into the national team. After making 10, Lehmann was omitted upon their return and did not play any further part in the season. In 1988/89, South Australia were at the bottom of the ladder, when coach Barry Richards called Lehmann into the team, playing against Western Australia at the WACA. Lehmann remembered little of the match; after being struck in the right temple by a Bruce Reid bouncer, he was knocked unconscious and temporarily ceased breathing. Lehmann made his mark in the following match against New South Wales Blues at Adelaide Oval, reaching 50, but the innings was marred by the manner in which it was ended. Going for a quick single, Lehmann collided with bowler Geoff Lawson and was run out after falling over. However, Richards and South Australian captain David Hookes claimed that Lawson had tripped Lehmann, leading to a confrontation between the two teams.

In 1989/90, Lehmann came into contention for national selection, after scoring 228 runs at the age of 19 in a match against New South Wales in that season. He also scored a century against the touring New Zealand cricket team and followed that with centuries in three consecutive Sheffield Shield matches. Having scored over 700 runs in the first half of the season, Lehmann was drafted into the Australian squad for the New Year's Test against Pakistan at the Sydney Cricket Ground after both openers David Boon and Geoff Marsh were injured. As Lehmann was not an opener, Mike Veletta and Tom Moody were selected, and he was relegated to being 12th man. Lehmann was also called into the squad for the triangular ODI series, but after being unused, he was replaced by Mark Waugh.

The following year, Lehmann was lured to move to Victoria by John Elliott and Ian Collins, then directors of the Carlton Football Club with a lucrative deal for him to play district cricket for Carlton, as well as the Victorian state team. Lehmann believed that he had a better chance of international selection, feeling that selectors disregarded batting performances at Adelaide Oval on the perception that it was a flat track. Lehmann was not, however, rewarded with international selection, but he did participate in a Shield victory in 1990/91. He was fortunate to play in the final, having needed facial surgery prior to the match after being struck in the nose during a training session. Following another season, Lehmann expressed dissatisfaction, and returned to South Australia.

== South Australia and Yorkshire: 1993/94 to 2007/08 ==
From the 1993/94 season until 2007/08, Lehmann played domestic cricket for his home state, South Australia, as well as for Yorkshire in England (from 1997 until 2006). During this time, Lehmann had great success as a player for both teams and he captained them both; South Australia from 1998/99 until 2006/07 and Yorkshire in 2002.

Playing for South Australia in this period, Lehmann scored over 10,500 runs in 107 first-class appearances for the state, at an average of around 55. In 1995/96 he was a part of the South Australian team that claimed the Sheffield Shield. He made 37 centuries with a top score of 301 not out against Western Australia at the Adelaide Oval in 2005/06. He also took 44 wickets at an average of 38.06. He held the record for the most first-class runs scored and first-class games played before selection to the Australian Test team prior to Michael Hussey's Test debut in 2005. He currently holds the record for the most runs in the history of the Sheffield Shield/Pura Cup with 13635, over 2000 more than the second highest run scorer, Jamie Cox. Whilst he had great success as a player, his captaincy record was not as distinguished; South Australia did not win any silverware under his captaincy and he quit the role at the end of the 2006/07 season after South Australia managed to win only one Pura Cup game. Lehmann announced his retirement on 19 November 2007 citing injury concerns as the main reason behind his decision to quit. He ended his limited-overs career for South Australia on 21 November with an unbeaten 126 from 104 balls in an unbroken 236 partnership with Matthew Elliott (a South Australian record for any wicket in List A cricket) to complete the highest successful run-chase in Australian List A cricket so far. His final first-class innings for South Australia was a man-of-the-match winning 167 against Western Australia the following weekend.

From 1997 until 2006, Lehmann represented Yorkshire as an overseas player. He is by far the most successful overseas player to represent the club since the members first voted to allow overseas players in 1992, having played 88 County Championship games, scoring 8871 runs at an average of 68.76. In 2001 he helped Yorkshire to their first County Championship title since 1968, with 1416 runs in 13 games at an average of 83.29. He scored 26 centuries with a top score of 339 against Durham in 2006 during his final game for the club, helping Yorkshire to avoid relegation by a single point. It is the highest individual first-class innings at Headingley, surpassing Don Bradman's 334 against England in 1930, and the second highest for Yorkshire behind George Hirst's 341 against Leicestershire in 1905. He also holds the record for the highest one-day score for Yorkshire, 191 from 103 balls against Nottinghamshire at Scarborough in 2001. He took 61 wickets at an average of 32.00 in County Championship games. As with South Australia, his captaincy record was not as distinguished as his playing record. He captained Yorkshire only in the 2002 season during which they were relegated to the second division of the County Championship. They did, however, win the Cheltenham and Gloucester Trophy, the 50-over-a-side limited overs competition, under his captaincy. Lehmann was a very popular member of the Yorkshire team amongst both the fans and the club hierarchy. He stated at the time that he would like to return to Yorkshire in a coaching role after his retirement from playing for South Australia.

== Playing for Australia ==
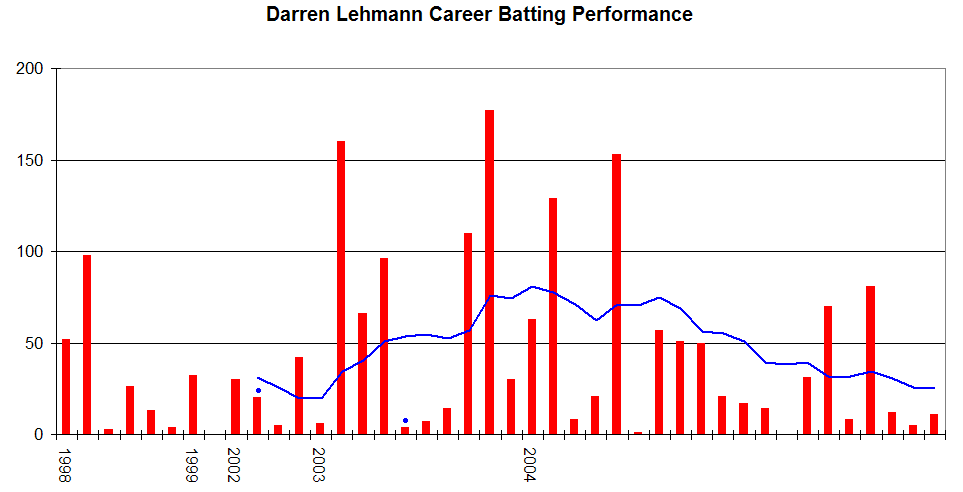
Darren Lehmann's Test career performance graph

Lehmann made his ODI debut in 1997 in Sharjah after injuries to other players. He was a sporadic member of the team until the 1997/98 Australian season, when captain Mark Taylor was dropped from the team. Lehmann then became a semi-regular member of the ODI team, and also toured India in early 1998.

Lehmann made his Test debut in the Third Test against India in March 1998 in Bangalore, after Steve Waugh suffered a hamstring injury. He scored 52 on debut, as well as claiming Indian captain Mohammad Azharuddin while bowling. Lehmann scored 98 in the First Test in Rawalpindi, but an injury forced him out of the Second Test in Peshawar. He failed in the final Test in Karachi and, despite scoring his maiden ODI century, was dropped for the first two Tests of the 1998/99 Ashes series. However, he was recalled for the final two Tests in Melbourne and Sydney.

Lehmann retained his position, however, in the ODI team, and scored another century during the West Indies tour. He went on to the 1999 World Cup, where he played in every match bar one where he was injured, and hit the winning runs in the final. However, upon his return to Australia, he was dropped from the ODI team in favour of Damien Martyn. Lehmann spent the 1999/2000 international season out of the team, and was not given an opportunity again until the 2000/01 season. During that season Australia was in dominant form, winning all five Tests. Following Matthew Hayden's heavy scoring in the 2001 Border–Gavaskar Trophy in India, he was afforded a place in the ODI squad ahead of Lehmann, who recalled for the final match of the series, in which he top scored.

Later in 2002, Lehmann was recalled to the Test team for the first time in almost four years but after three Tests without posting a large score he was replaced by Martin Love. During an ODI against Sri Lanka, upon returning to the dressing room after being run out, Lehmann made an offensive racial comment which saw him banned for five ODI matches, becoming the first player banned for racial vilification. After missing the first part of the 2003 Cricket World Cup, Lehmann went on to take the winning catch in the final against India in Johannesburg. Lehmann's Test spot was spared when Martyn was forced out due to a finger injury, with Love and Lehmann playing in the middle order on the subsequent tour of the West Indies. Lehmann then posted his maiden Test century on the tour, and on the winter Test series against Bangladesh in northern Australia, Lehmann scored consecutive centuries to solidify his position in the team. His Test career was again put on hold, when he was injured in November against Zimbabwe, allowing Katich to play in his place and score a century and top score in both innings in the Fourth Test against India at the Sydney Cricket Ground to stake a claim for Lehmann's spot. However, Steve Waugh retired after the series, and both players were included on the tour to Sri Lanka. There, Lehmann scored consecutive centuries on turning tracks against Muttiah Muralitharan to help Australia to a 3–0 clean sweep despite conceding a first innings lead in each of the matches.

On the 2004 tour to India Lehmann publicly offered to be dropped following a run of poor form, but the selectors did retained him. Lehmann stayed on briefly but was dropped in favour of Shane Watson for the Sydney Test. He soon lost his place on the ODI team. Lehmann was never again on the Cricket Australia's contracted players list. In November 2007, he announced his retirement: "Physically and mentally I've had enough", he said.

He published his autobiography, Worth the Wait, in 2004.

== Coaching career ==
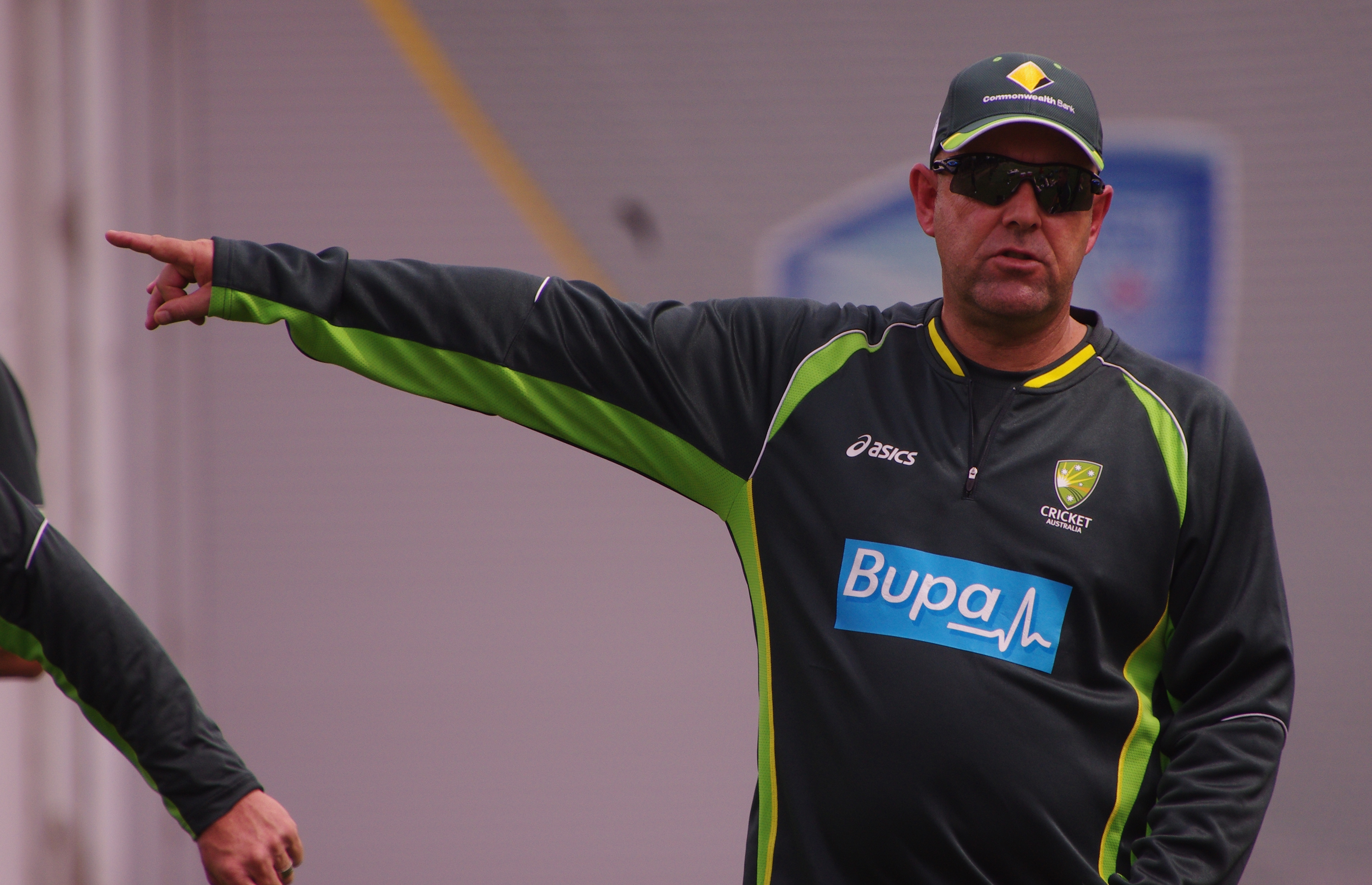
Lehmann coaching Australia in 2014

In 2008, Lehmann toured with the Cricket Australia Centre of Excellence as an assistant coach. After the Deccan Chargers disastrous first season, he took charge of them as coach – replacing former India player Robin Singh; Adam Gilchrist was named captain replacing VVS Laxman. Following the below-par performance in the inaugural season, and finishing at the bottom, Deccan then staged an inspired comeback in 2009 by winning the second IPL season. Subsequent to an undefeated run in the initial league stage, the team suffered minor setbacks by losing some close matches. However, the return of Andrew Symonds, Rohit Sharma regaining form, and the continuing exuberance of Captain Adam Gilchrist, bolstered the side. Some luck came the Charger's way towards the end of the league stage, with Kings XI Punjab and Rajasthan Royals losing key matches, enabling Deccan to reach the semi-finals. During the semi-finals against the Delhi Daredevils (who were at the top of the table), few gave the Chargers more than an outside chance of winning. Nevertheless, and against the odds, Gilchrist scored a sensational 85 off just 35 balls to put the Daredevils out of the competition, thus giving the Chargers their first IPL final against the Royal Challengers Bangalore. In the final match, Gilchrist was out for a duck in the first over, however the Chargers managed to recover and posted a total of 143 for the loss of 6 wickets; it was felt that a good defending total would have been a further 20 to 30 runs. In the second innings the Chargers came out with all guns blazing right from the first ball, and their spirited effort ensured that they successfully defended the total, winning the game by 6 runs and lifting the prized IPL trophy.

On account of emerging as the winners of the 2009 season of the Indian Premier League, the team participated in the inaugural edition of the T20 Champions League, along with two other Indian teams. These were the runners-up of the IPL in 2009 – the Royal Challengers Bangalore and the Delhi Daredevils, the toppers of the league-stage points table. The Deccan Chargers were knocked-out in the group stages after losing to the Somerset Sabres and Trinidad & Tobago, who they were drawn against in Group A.

After winning the IPL in 2009, there were great expectations of Chargers for 2010. Disappointingly, the team opened with a loss in their inaugural match against KKR, but subsequently won next three matches. Unfortunately, the Chargers then went on to lose their next five matches. This situation caused many to doubt whether the Chargers would be able to make it into next round, but they did so by winning the next five consecutive matches, which qualified them for the play-offs. However the Chargers lost both games in the play-offs (Semi-finals), and were relegated to third place.

Before the start of the 2011 Auction of players, the Chargers decided not to retain any of their existing team, putting all of them up for auction. The much anticipated Auction in January not only lived up to expectations, but exceeded them in many ways. The new Deccan team started the 2011 campaign by losing their first two games, but managed to win their next match. Thereafter the team started losing badly, and despite winning some games, were consequentially eliminated from the competition. The team managed to bounce back and showed some pride by winning their final three matches, although these results had no effect on the other teams' chances for qualifying. The Charger's disappointing performance was clearly due to the inexperience of the new squad, and especially to the lack of internationally experienced Indian batsmen. Fans of DC have criticised management for not retaining Rohit Sharma during player the Auction. Deccan finally got to play IPL matches at their home ground after almost three years, but their dismal performances continued at Hyderabad, with but a single win against RCB being the only exception. However, in the away matches, the Chargers did manage to beat Delhi Daredevils, Mumbai Indians, Kolkata Knight Riders, Pune Warriors, and Kings XI. They ended on a positive note with three consecutive wins, but were unable to rise above seventh position in the league standings.

In the 2012 Indian Premier League competition the Deccan Chargers named a new fielding coach Trevor Penney, replacing Mike Young. The Chargers failed to play consistently in 2012, with consecutive defeats – some by narrow margins. Shikhar Dhawan, Dale Steyn, and Cameron White were the only players who managed to help the team put up a fight. The team experienced weakness in the bowling and fielding departments, with fast bowler Ishant Sharma being ruled out due to injury, and spinner Pragyan Ojha traded to the Mumbai Indians. Deccan finished eighth out of the nine teams in the league stage points table, after languishing at the bottom for most of the season. The Deccan Chargers had come into the 2012 season being characterized as 'underdogs', and are yet to lose that name.

Lehmann expressed interest in taking up the England coach's job, which was up for grabs after Peter Moores was sacked in first week of January 2009. Lehmann was not the first Australian whose name had been brought-up for discussion of the English job, as Tom Moody was also linked to the position. South Africa's Graham Ford, the Kent director of cricket, had also expressed an interest in filling the post. After having his name connected to the English cricket team, Lehmann was also linked to the New Zealand cricket team, as they were searching for coach as well, to succeed Andy Moles who had resigned in October 2009. Lehmann, Mark Greatbatch, and Jeff Crowe were shortlisted as candidates for the post with New Zealand Cricket, with Lehmann eventually losing-out to Greatbatch. Lehmann was then named coach of the Queensland team after Trevor Barsby's sudden exit in 2010. He took over as coach of the Twenty20 side to prepare for its opening match against Victoria. Under Lehmann's coaching, Queensland won the 2011/12 (110th) season of the Sheffield Shield, the Australian domestic first-class cricket competition; this was only their seventh victory since joining that competition in 1926. They had won six out of their ten Shield matches, lost two, and drew two matches. At the same time as he took up coaching Queensland, he also signed to the Brisbane Heat side, which competed in an expanded eight-team domestic Twenty20 competition. Once again Lehmann's old mate in the Australian team Shane Warne suggested to Cricket Australia that Lehmann would be a perfect coach for the young Australian cricket team. Warne also believed his old-school approach would be good for either the vacant head coach role, or a position on the selection panel.

Lehmann was appointed the coach of the IPL Kings XI Punjab franchise for 2013, replacing Adam Gilchrist who was coach (and captain) in 2012; he was himself was replaced in 2014 by Sanjay Bangar. As well as previously coaching the now defunct Deccan Chargers franchise, Lehmann had also played for the Rajasthan Royals in the inaugural IPL edition in 2008.

In June 2013, Lehmann was appointed as head coach of Australia, replacing Mickey Arthur who had suffered a bad result in the Champions Trophy. His first assignment was the Ashes series in England, which Australia lost 3–0, however they won the ODI series.

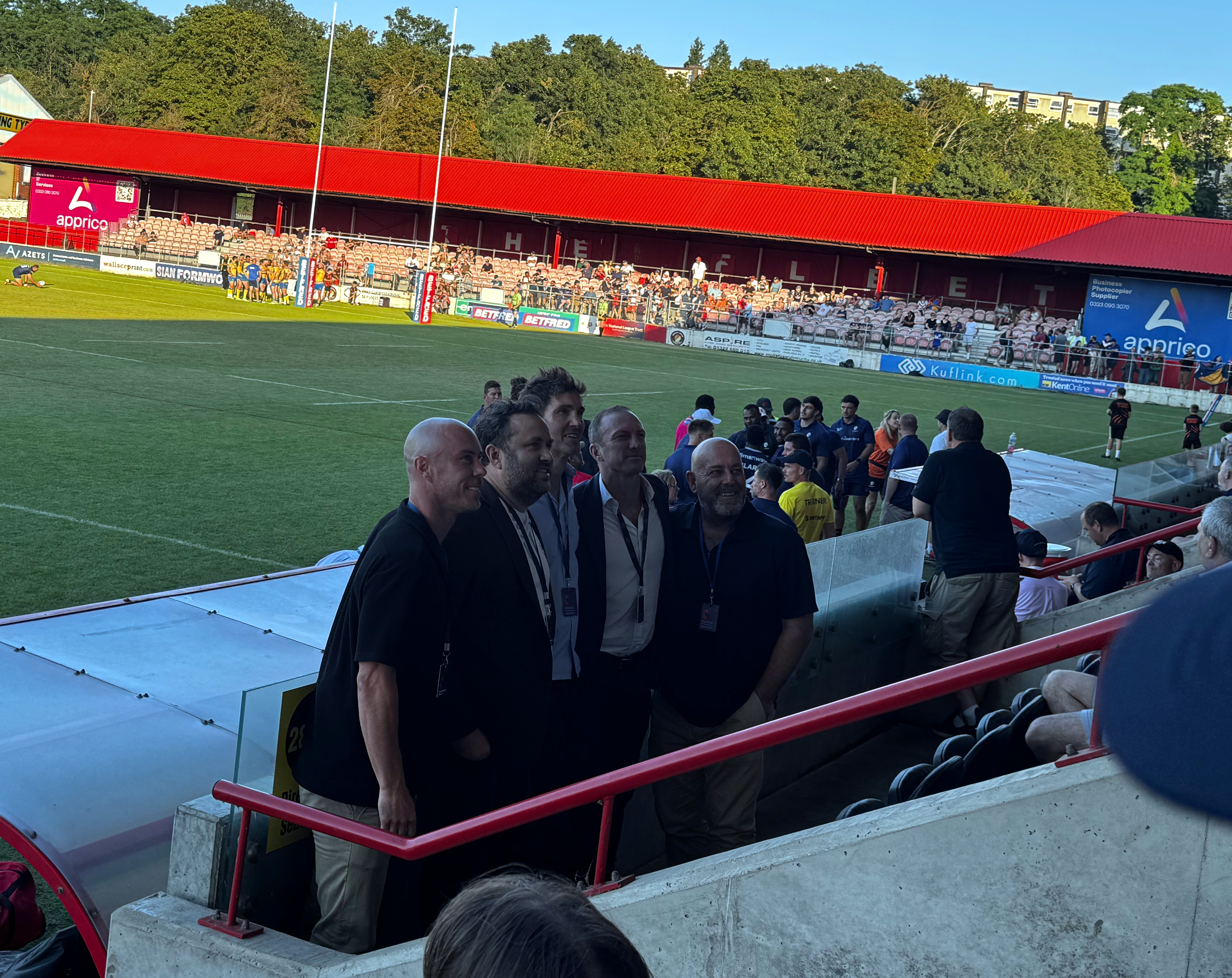
Lehmann alongside Chris Lynn, Grant Wechsel, Andrew Gray & Darren Lockyer in July 2026

On 25 December 2017, Lehmann stated that he would not seek renewal on his contract after the end of 2019.

=== Ball-tampering scandal and resignation ===
Lehmann was suspected of involvement in altering the conditions of the ball, along with Cameron Bancroft, skipper Steve Smith, and vice-captain David Warner, on the third day of the third Test against South Africa on 24 March 2018. After an investigation by Cricket Australia, Lehmann was cleared of involvement. However, he later announced that he would resign as head coach of Australia after the fourth and final Test match of the series in Johannesburg.

In March 2019, Lehmann was named head coach of Brisbane Heat, a team in the Big Bash League. In July 2021, he stepped down as head coach of the Brisbane Heat to become the assistant coach of the team. In 2019, he was named head coach by Northern Superchargers, a team in 'The Hundred' tournament. In January 2022, he resigned from the post, citing COVID-19 restrictions as the main reason behind this decision.

In October 2024, Lehmann was appointed head coach at Northamptonshire County Cricket Club. He agreed a one-year contract extension in August 2025, and a further two-year deal in April 2026, tying him into the club until at least the end of the 2029 season.

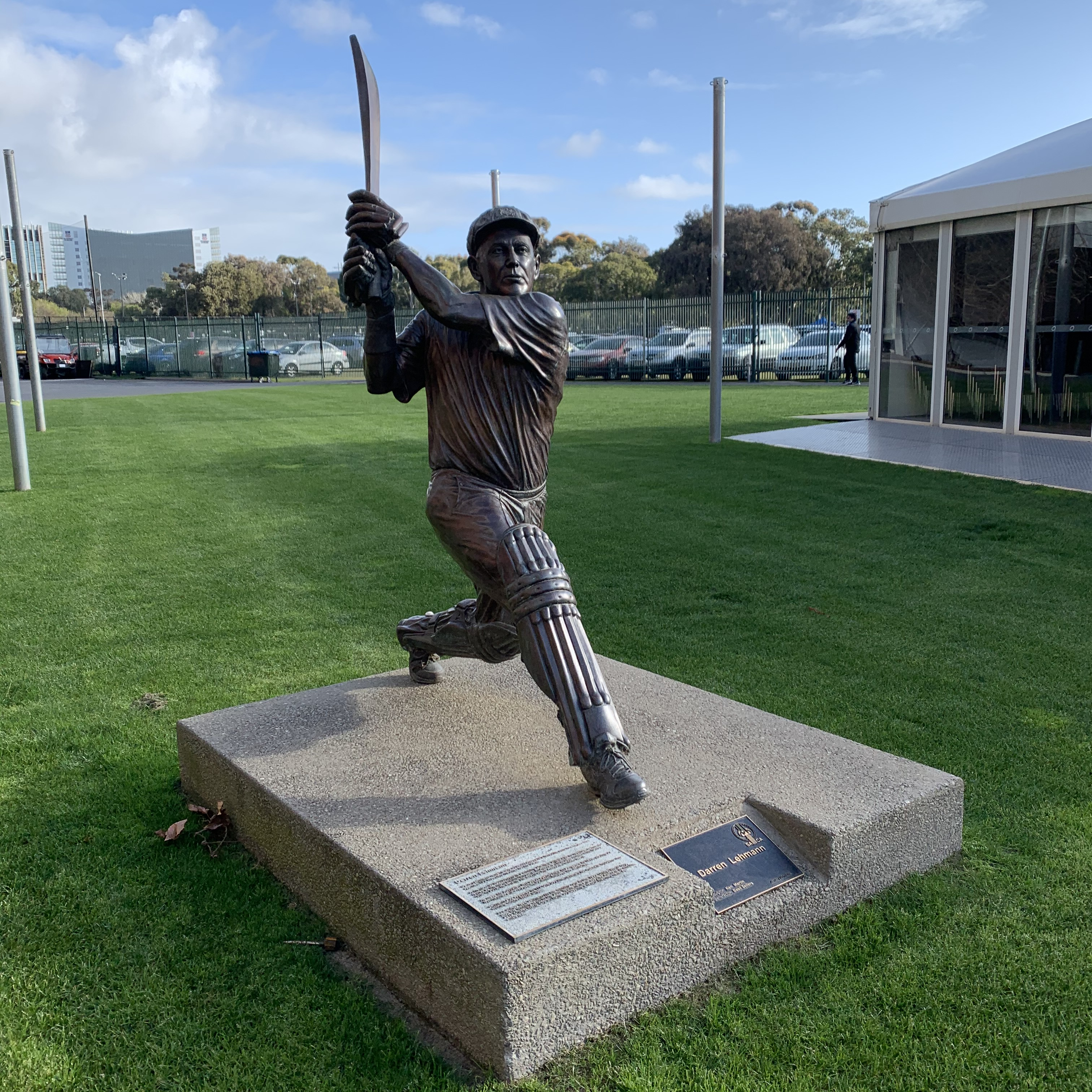
Lehmann statue at Adelaide Oval.

== Playing style ==
Lehmann's batting technique was quite unconventional; taking guard outside leg stump, and, just before a ball was bowled, stepping back and across toward and sometimes past off stump. This peculiar technique meant that if the ball was short in pitch, he did not need to step back any further. Lehmann was noted for his play against spin, and was a useful left-arm orthodox spinner himself, as evidenced by his match figures of 6/92 against Sri Lanka in Colombo in 2004. He was relatively accurate, but had little ability to turn the ball and used a flat trajectory.

== Personal life ==
Lehmann is married to Andrea White, the sister of his Victorian, and later Yorkshire, teammate and English Test player Craig White. He has two children with his previous wife Emma, one of whom, Jake, has played first-class cricket.

== Recognition ==
In 2012 a statue of Lehmann by sculptor Ken Martin was unveiled at Adelaide Oval.
