= Peter Spink =

Peter Spink (17 August 1926 – 22 November 2010) was an English Anglican priest, Canon of Coventry Cathedral, mystic, spiritual teacher, writer and founder of the "Omega Order", a mixed teaching and contemplative community.

== Biography ==
George Peter Arthur Spink was born in Gaddesby, Leicestershire, and, after leaving school, worked as a tea-packer and in coal mines. In his late teens he became a Christian and went on to train as a missionary, spending 5 years evangelising to the villages of northern India from 1949 to 1954. On his return to England he was ordained as an Anglican priest, spending the years from 1956 to 1959 as a curate in two parishes in the Midlands - one a large housing estate. It was here, that he became convinced of the importance of the healing ministry after laying hands on a seriously ill child who subsequently recovered.

From 1959, Revd. Spink served as a chaplain to British embassies in Bonn, Vienna, Prague and Budapest. On returning to England he became a chaplain at Coventry Cathedral, then Canon residentiary in 1970. From 1977 to 1980, he was warden at Burrswood Home of healing, an independent Christian non-surgical hospital. While at Burrswood he founded a small community in a formerly-derelict house in Tunbridge Wells, which became the Omega Order, a mixed ecumenical and teaching order.

In 1981, Spink left Burrswood to become the full-time Warden of the Omega Order, which, in 1986, moved its headquarters to Winford manor in Winford, Somerset which it occupied until around 2000. He made several appearance on television, and was the subject of one part of the religious series "Inner Journeys" (HTV, 5 December 1993) where he described his spiritual quest for understanding. He converted to Catholicism around 2000.

In later life Spink suffered from Parkinson's disease and died in November 2010, aged 84. He was married to Ruby (née Cox), a fellow missionary in 1948, and had a daughter, Kathryn Spink, a notable writer and biographer.

== Teaching ==
Spink wrote several books expounding a philosophy of "experiential wisdom" rather than conventional religious belief, mirroring his own "escape from the box" which allowed him "glimpses of the Cosmic or universal Christ towards which Jesus so clearly points". In his last book, "Beyond Belief" (1996), he described his teaching as for those "who are looking for a God....who can be known and experienced directly". His own influences included Christian mysticism, Teilhard de Chardin, Sufism, George Gurdjieff, Rudolf Steiner and Theosophy; his approach has been described as "New Age" by some.

The purpose of the Omega Order, which he founded, was to help people move beyond the confines of orthodox religious belief to a more intuitive, mystical appreciation of God. The philosophy of the order was encapsulated in a written testament called the "Omega vision". The order published several books (and a regular journal called "Omega News") and functioned as a retreat and course center, based at Winford Priory in Somerset, as well as housing a small contemplative and teaching community of monks and nuns. The offices were celebrated daily.

== Bibliography ==
- Spiritual Man in the New Age (Darton, Longman and Todd, 1980)
- The Path of the Mystic (Darton, Longman and Todd, 1983)
- The End of an Age (Omega Trust Publications, 1983 )
- A Time for Knowledge (Omega Trust, 1984)
- A Christian in the New Age (Darton, Longman and Todd, 1991)
- Beyond Belief, how to develop mystical consciousness and discover the God within, Piatkus, 1996.
