= Barsby =

Village in Leicestershire, England

Coordinates: 52.695°N 0.968°W

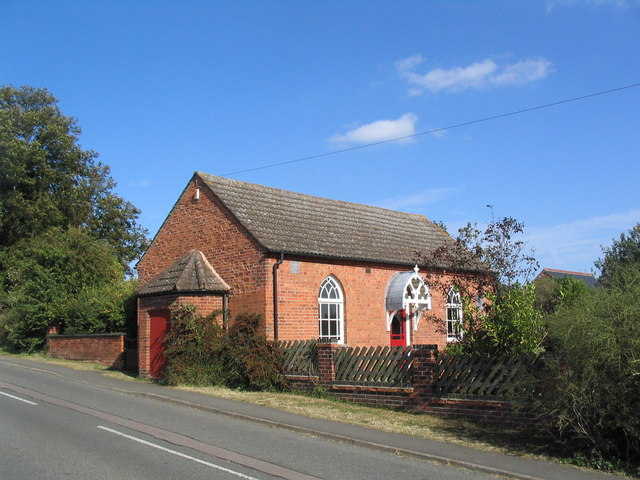
- Wesleyan Chapel

- Location within Leicestershire
- OS grid reference: SK698113
- Civil parish: Gaddesby
- District: Melton
- Shire county: Leicestershire
- Region: East Midlands
- Country: England
- Sovereign state: United Kingdom
- Post town: LEICESTER
- Postcode district: LE7
- Dialling code: 01664
- Police: Leicestershire
- Fire: Leicestershire
- Ambulance: East Midlands
- UK Parliament: Melton and Syston

Barsby is a hamlet and former civil parish, now in the parish of Gaddesby, in the Melton district of Leicestershire, England. In 1931 the parish had a population of 162. The surname derives from the village.

== History ==
The village's name means "farm/settlement of Barn" or "farm/settlement of the children/offspring". Barsby was recorded in the Domesday Book as Barnesbie. Barsby was a chapelry in Ashby-Folville parish in 1866 Barsby became a civil parish in its own right, on 24 March 1884 Ashby Newbould was transferred from Ashby Folville and areas were moved to and from South Croxton. On 1 April 1936 the parish was abolished and merged with Gaddesby.
