= Amy Vine =

Australian cricketer

Personal information
- Full name: Amy Joy Vine
- Born: 22 December 1991 (age 34); Carlton, Victoria, Australia
- Batting: Right-handed
- Bowling: Right-arm leg break
- Role: Batter

Domestic team information
- Years: Team
- 2018/19–2021/22: Victoria

Career statistics
Competition	WLA
Matches	6
Runs scored	83
Batting average	16.60
100s/50s	0/1
Top score	56
Catches/stumpings	2/–
- Source: CricketArchive, 29 March 2021

Amy Joy Vine (born 22 December 1991) is an Australian cricketer who plays as a right-handed batter. She last played for Victoria in the Women's National Cricket League (WNCL). She made her Victoria debut on 9 November 2018 against the ACT Meteors. She made her maiden half-century on 5 February 2020, top-scoring with 56 in a three-wicket loss to the South Australian Scorpions.
