= Makinley Blows =

Australian cricketer (born 1997)

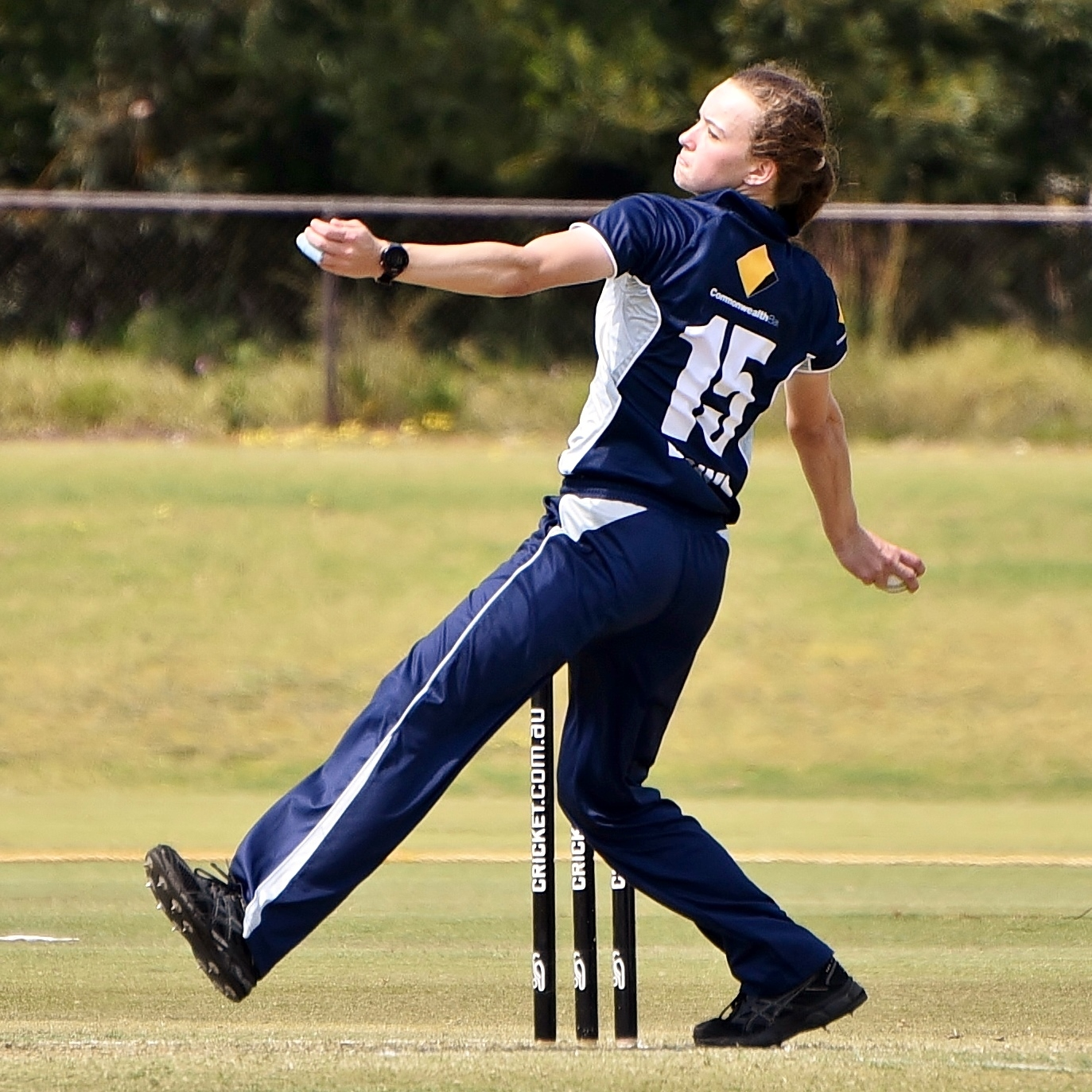
- Blows bowling for Victoria, 2018

Personal information
- Full name: Makinley Anne Blows
- Born: 12 December 1997 (age 28); Broken Hill, New South Wales, Australia
- Nickname: Makka
- Batting: Left-handed
- Bowling: Right-arm medium
- Role: All-rounder

Domestic team information
- Years: Team
- 2016/17–2022/23: Victoria
- 2016/17–2018/19: Melbourne Stars
- 2019/20–2021/22: Melbourne Renegades

Career statistics
| Competition | WLA | WT20 |
|---|---|---|
| Matches | 27 | 28 |
| Runs scored | 502 | 35 |
| Batting average | 29.52 | 7.00 |
| 100s/50s | 1/2 | 0/0 |
| Top score | 105 | 16 |
| Balls bowled | 621 | 211 |
| Wickets | 13 | 8 |
| Bowling average | 45.76 | 34.62 |
| 5 wickets in innings | 0 | 0 |
| 10 wickets in match | 0 | 0 |
| Best bowling | 2/7 | 2/22 |
| Catches/stumpings | 4/– | 1/– |
- Source: CricketArchive, 30 March 2021

Makinley Blows (born 12 December 1997) is an Australian cricketer who played for Victoria in the Women's National Cricket League (WNCL). An all-rounder, she bats left-handed and bowls right-arm medium pace.

In the 2015–16 under-18 State Championships, Blows was able to produce a knock of 152 not out to help send her team, Mallee Murray into the finals.

Prior to that, in 2014–15, she made heads turn by scoring two unbeaten centuries on Day 2 of the under-18 State Female Championships. In the first match, she scored 125* after only facing 69 balls, while in the afternoon she dominated with 105* also off 69 balls.

Blows was also a major contributor with the bat in the under-18 National Championships, scoring 205 runs throughout the tournament. Blows was also able to do some damage with the ball, with her best figures including 2/20 against South Australia.
