= Jemma Barsby =

Australian cricketer

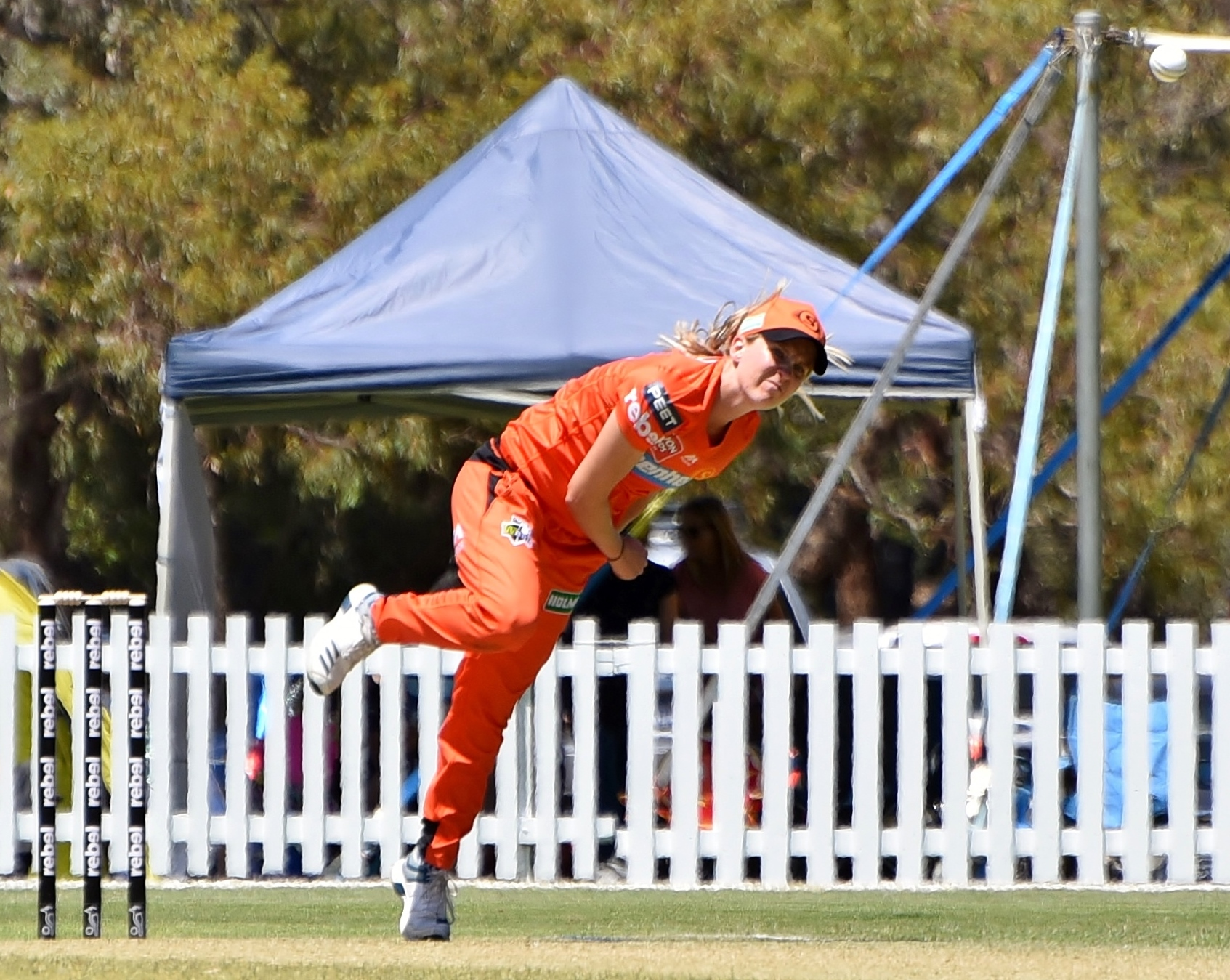
- Barsby bowling for Perth Scorchers, 2019

Personal information
- Full name: Jemma Louise Barsby
- Born: 4 October 1995 (age 31); Herston, Queensland, Australia
- Batting: Left-handed
- Bowling: Right-arm off break, Slow left-arm orthodox
- Role: All-rounder
- Relatives: Trevor Barsby (father); Corey Barsby (brother)

Domestic team information
- Years: Team
- 2010/11–2019/20: Queensland (squad no. 15)
- 2015/16–2018/19: Brisbane Heat (squad no. 15)
- 2019/20–2020/21: Perth Scorchers (squad no. 15)
- 2020/21–present: South Australia (squad no. 15)
- 2021/22–2025/26: Adelaide Strikers (squad no. 4)
- 2025/26-present: Sydney Thunder

Career statistics
Competition	WLA	WT20
Matches	109	192
Runs scored	1,417	576
Batting average	23.22	9.60
100s/50s	0/7	0/0
Top score	78	36
Balls bowled	4,596	2,973
Wickets	147	151
Bowling average	23.31	21.12
5 wickets in innings	2	0
10 wickets in match	0	0
Best bowling	5/12	4/2
Catches/stumpings	45/–	57/–
- Source: CricketArchive, 20 October 2024

Jemma Louise Barsby (born 4 October 1995) is an Australian cricketer who plays for South Australia and the Sydney Thunder . She has previously played for Queensland, Brisbane Heat, Adelaide Strikers and Perth Scorchers.

An all-rounder who can bowl with both hands, Barsby is the daughter of former Queensland Bulls opening batsman and coach Trevor Barsby. She developed her ambidextrous off spin bowling skills as a child in her backyard, with assistance from her brother and encouragement from her father, and also has a penchant for switch hitting while batting.

== Career ==
In October 2010, Barsby made her debut for Queensland Fire, after touring with the Shooting Stars squad. She has been a member of the Brisbane Heat squad since its inaugural WBBL01 season (2015–16). As she was preparing for that inaugural season, she started experiencing shoulder pain and later numbness in her fingers; after testing, she was diagnosed with multiple sclerosis.

Barsby and her Brisbane Heat teammates have since participated in charity events for MS Queensland. As of January 2017, her MS symptoms were still mild; she was on daily medication, and was also using an ice vest on really hot days.

In November 2018, she was named in Brisbane Heat's squad for the 2018–19 Women's Big Bash League season. In October 2019, she signed with Perth Scorchers and in six games, averaged 21.25 with the bat and 37.00 with the ball.

In June 2024, Barsby was added to the South Australia women's squad ahead of the 2020–21 Women's National Cricket League season. In September 2021, she was named in the Adelaide Strikers squad for 2021–22 Women's Big Bash League season.

In October 2026, it was announced that Barsby had signed with the Sydney Thunder for the 2026-26 Woman's Big Bag League season.
