= Amy Yates =

Australian cricketer (born 1998)

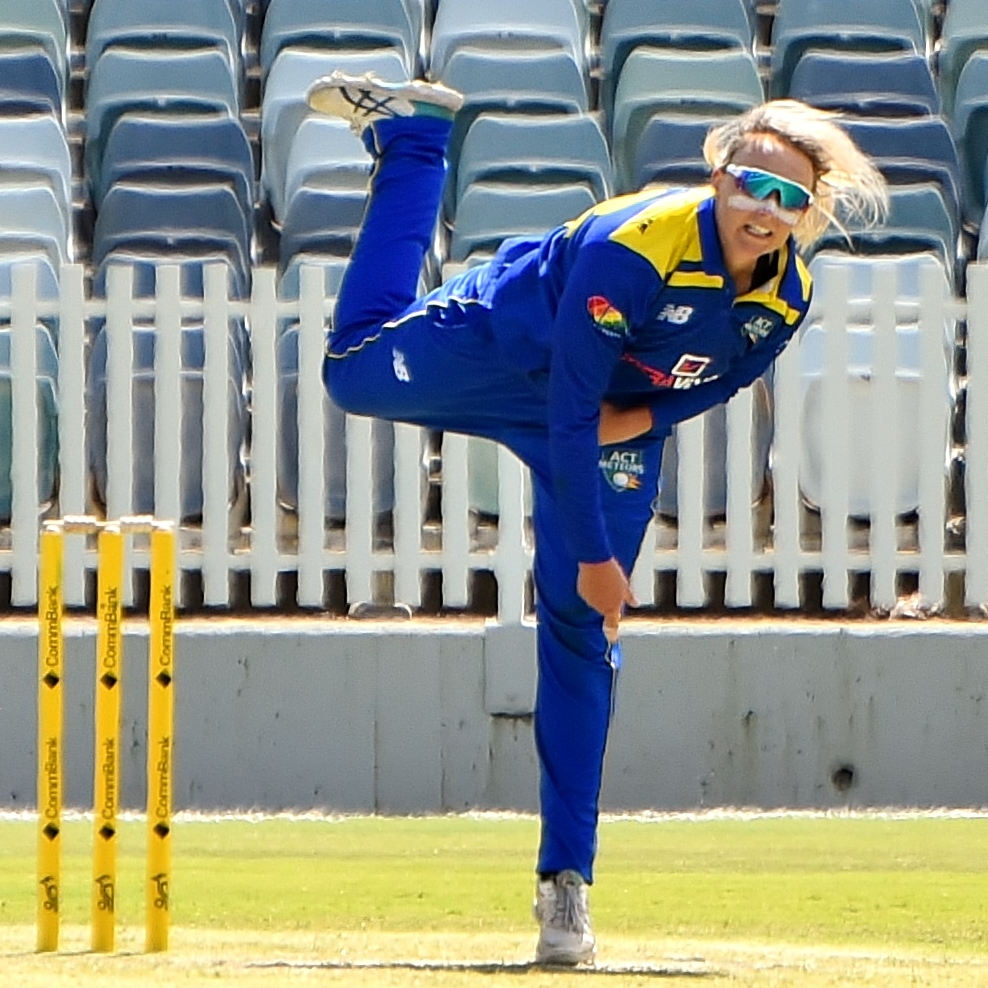
- Yates bowling for the ACT in September 2022

Personal information
- Full name: Amy Beach Yates
- Born: 30 September 1998 (age 28)
- Batting: Right-handed
- Bowling: Right-arm medium
- Role: Bowler

Domestic team information
- Years: Team
- 2016/17–2020/21: Melbourne Renegades
- 2019/20–2022/23: Australian Capital Territory

Career statistics
Competition	List A	Twenty20
Matches	31	7
Runs scored	160	30
Batting average	8.42	7.50
100s/50s	0/0	0/0
Top score	35	17
Balls bowled	1,052	–
Wickets	27	–
Bowling average	35.37	–
5 wickets in innings	1	–
10 wickets in match	0	–
Best bowling	6/33	–
Catches/stumpings	7/–	0/–
- Source: CricketArchive, 5 October 2025

Amy Beach Yates (born 30 September 1998) is an Australian cricketer who plays as a right-arm medium pace bowler and right-handed batter. She last played for the ACT Meteors in the Women's National Cricket League (WNCL).

Yates originally signed for Melbourne Renegades ahead of the 2016–17 WBBL season, but she played just one match and was not retained. She returned to the Renegades for the 2020–21 WBBL season.

Yates joined the ACT Meteors in 2019. In just her second WNCL game she took six wickets for 33 runs against the South Australian Scorpions, which were the best bowling figures in Meteors history.
