= Gaddesby =

Village in Leicestershire, England

Coordinates: 52.711824°N 0.982995°W

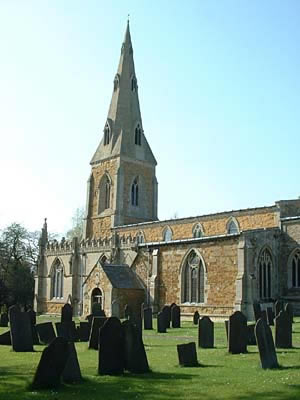
- St Luke's Church

- Location within Leicestershire
- Population: 762 (2011)
- OS grid reference: SK688131
- Civil parish: Gaddesby
- District: Melton
- Shire county: Leicestershire
- Region: East Midlands
- Country: England
- Sovereign state: United Kingdom
- Post town: LEICESTER
- Postcode district: LE7
- Dialling code: 01664
- Police: Leicestershire
- Fire: Leicestershire
- Ambulance: East Midlands
- UK Parliament: Melton and System

Gaddesby is a village and civil parish in the Melton borough of Leicestershire, England. The population of the civil parish (including Ashby Folville and Barsby) at the 2011 census was 762. It is located around 5.5 miles (8.9 km) southwest of Melton Mowbray and 8 miles (13 km) northeast of Leicester.

Gaddesby has 170 households and a population of around 450, while the parish, which includes the nearby villages of Ashby Folville and Barsby, has a total population of 762 according to the 2011 Census. Recent housing development has made Gaddesby a popular, rural dormitory for Leicester.

== History ==
Gaddesby's name is derived from the Old Norse words gaddr and by, meaning 'farm/settlement of Gaddr' or 'farm/settlement on a hill spur', indicating that it was a settlement during the Danish occupation of England between the 9th and 11th centuries.

It is mentioned in the Domesday Book of 1086 as Gadesbi, a mainly pastoral village with a mill, within the hundred of Goscote.

== Parish Church ==
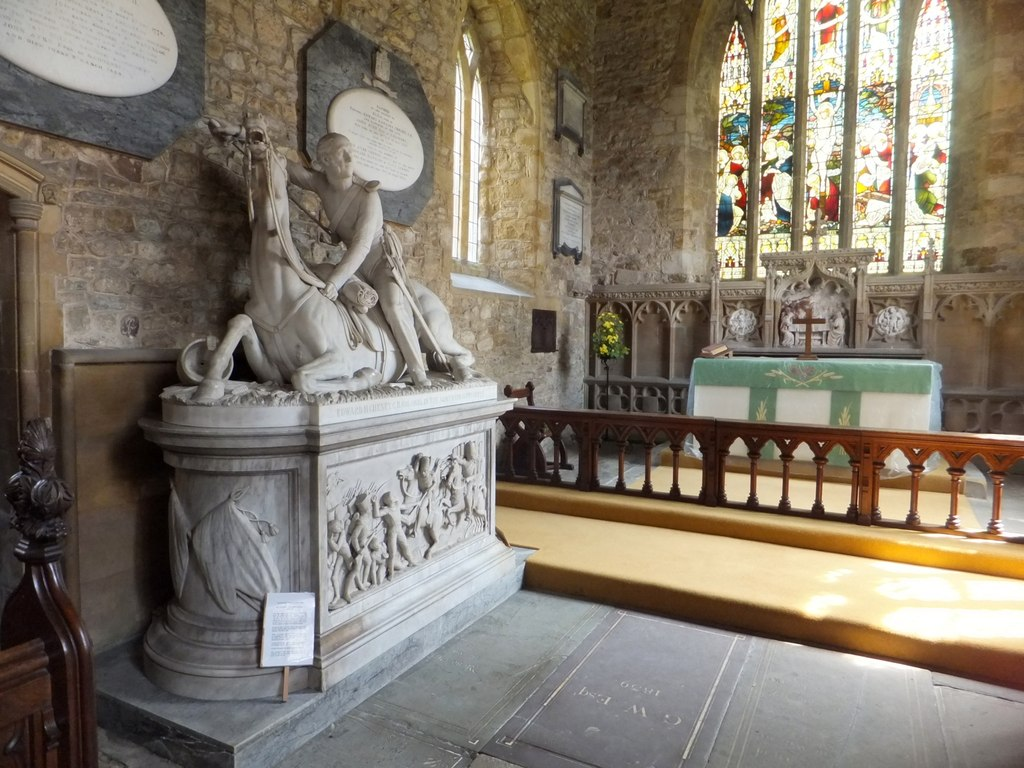
The sculpture of a dying horse and rider on a marble chest, in memory of Col. Edward Cheney in 1848

The Grade I listed St Luke's Church was originally built as a Norman chapel - a single space without a tower. It was part of the soke of Rothley from the tenth century. The two aisles, North and South, the tower and the Chancel were added in the thirteenth century and elaborated in the next two hundred years. The church is reputed to have some of the finest examples of fourteenth century stonework in the country which adorn the South West corner on the outside of the Knights Templar's chapel. The oak pews in the nave are probably fifteenth century and the limestone font dates from 1320. There is a peal of eight bells, the earliest dated 1562.

The size of the church attests to the importance of the village during the period of its development. Gaddesby had grown as a result of the importance of the wool industry in East Leicestershire. Indeed, it had a weekly market and an annual fair from the fourteenth century. As the wool industry declined and the Western half of the county rose in prominence during the Industrial Revolution so Gaddesby settled back into being a rural backwater.

The near life-size marble sculpture of a dying horse and rider on a marble chest, created by Joseph Gott in memory of Colonel Edward Hawkins Cheney, C.B., of the Scots Greys, was originally at Gaddesby Hall. It was moved to the chancel in 1917.

== The Hall ==
Gaddesby Hall was built on the site of an earlier house called Paske Hall, which was surrounded by a moat and dated back to 1390. This old hall was pulled down in 1744 and the present hall erected. The houses in the village formed part of the estate of Gaddesby Hall. Over the years the hall had several owners, including the Nedham, Ayre and Cheney families, all of whom are commemorated in the church. The estate was put up for sale in 1917, at which time the celebrated statue of Colonel Cheney was moved into St Luke's. After suffering neglect and from its use by the American Armed Forces during the Second World War, the hall was reduced in size and renovated during the 1950s.

== Notable features ==
The village had many springs, and there are still two water pumps in Chapel Lane. On the corner of Chapel Lane and Cross Street, a large boulder called "the blue stone" marks a spot from which John Wesley is reputed to have preached. The Methodist chapel was demolished in 1966.

Many listed and older properties, including former hunting lodges, still exist. An old windmill remains just outside Gaddesby.

A cross country running race, the Gaddesby Gallop, is organised before Christmas.

Canon Peter Spink (1926–2010), Anglican priest, was born here.
