= Tina Barsby =

Plant geneticist

Tina Lorraine Barsby is a plant geneticist working in the UK. She primarily works in the agriculture sector and is currently the CEO of the National Institute of Agricultural Botany (NIAB). Her most notable work has been in global food security. She was appointed an OBE in the 2018 New Year Honours List for services to agricultural science and biotechnology. She was awarded an honorary doctorate from Bangor University in 2023 for Public Service (Including Health).

== Education ==
Barsby achieved a first degree in Agricultural Botany at the University of Wales, Bangor. She then completed a PhD at the University of Nottingham and spent a post-doctoral period at Kansas State University.

== Work ==
After her post-doctoral period at Kansas State University, Barsby worked at the biopharmaceutical company Allelix Inc, Ontario, Canada for several years before returning to the UK in 1989.

She joined the seed company Nickerson UK (now part of the Groupe Limagrain) where she remained for 18 years doing academic work along with her commercial research, until joining NIAB in 2006. Barsby was appointed Chief Executive and Director of NIAB in September 2008, becoming the first female Chief Executive in the institute's 90-year history.

Barsby was the principal investigator for the BBSRC-funded Cambridge-India network for translational research in nitrogen, and co-investigator for a research project examining grass peas and their potential for sustainable sustenance for stressful environments. She has also coordinated work to develop "superwheat" and other new crops and methods of farming, with environmental impact a particular focus.

== OBE ==
Barsby was appointed as an Officer of the Order of the British Empire (OBE) in the 2018 New Year Honours List for services to UK Agricultural Science and Biotechnology, and was praised for her scientific achievements. On receiving this award, she stated:

“I think this honour only serves to underline the importance of this national initiative to ensure good standards of production across the UK supply chain from farm to retail shelf.”

— Dr Tina Barsby

== Councils ==
Barsby is a member of the Agri-Food Technology Council. She has had a long and close association with BBSRC for at least fifteen years, having served as Chair of BBSRC Responsive Mode Committee B, and as a member of the strategic advisory and peer review panels.

In 2018, Barsby was appointed to a Cambridgeshire business board as an advisor on enterprise partnership.
