= Corey Barsby =

Australian cricketer (born 1992)

Personal information
- Born: 18 March 1992 (age 34); Brisbane, Queensland, Australia
- Source: Cricinfo, 9 October 2020

Corey Ronald Barsby (born 18 March 1992) is an Australian cricketer. He played in two List A matches for Queensland in 2011.

Barsby's father, Trevor, represented Queensland in First-class cricket. He represented Queensland in under-14's Rugby League but later focused on cricket. He began playing for Sandgate-Redcliffe in Brisbane Grade Cricket in the 2009/10 season and in the 2010/11 season he scored 600 runs for the club earning him selection in the Australia Under-19 merit side in December 2010. In early 2011 he was selected for Queensland in the Ryobi Cup and wore the No. 2 which had been retired when his father retired from the State team.

Barsby was on the fringes of the Queensland team as of 2013, and as of 2015 he was captaining Sandgate-Redcliffe. In 2016 he was selected for the Queensland Academy of Sport 2nd XI again, having previously played with the Academy. As of the 2019/20 season Barsby, was still captaining Sandgate-Redcliffe.

== See also ==
- List of Queensland first-class cricketers
