= Joseph Gott =

English sculptor (1785–1860)

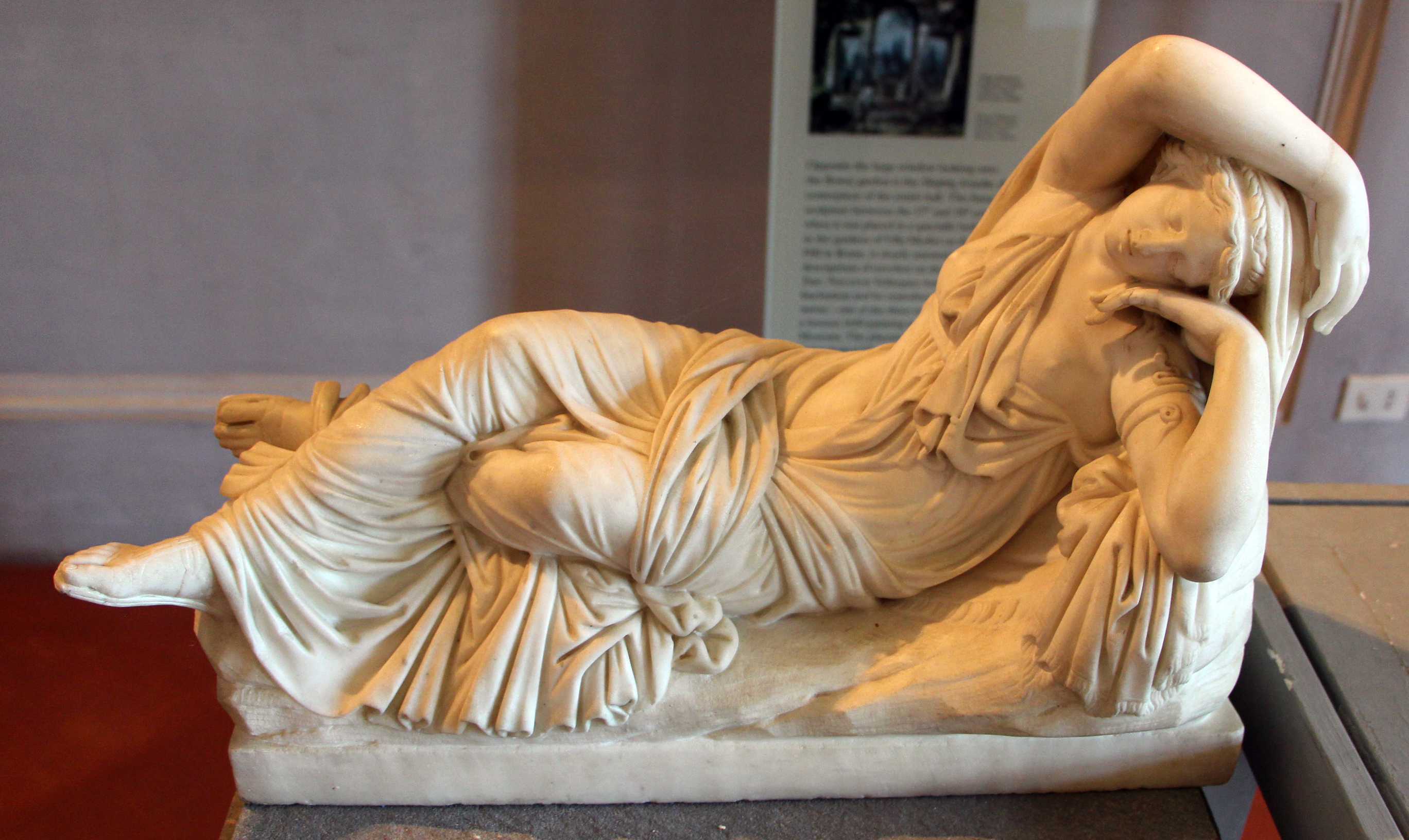
Ariadne by Gott

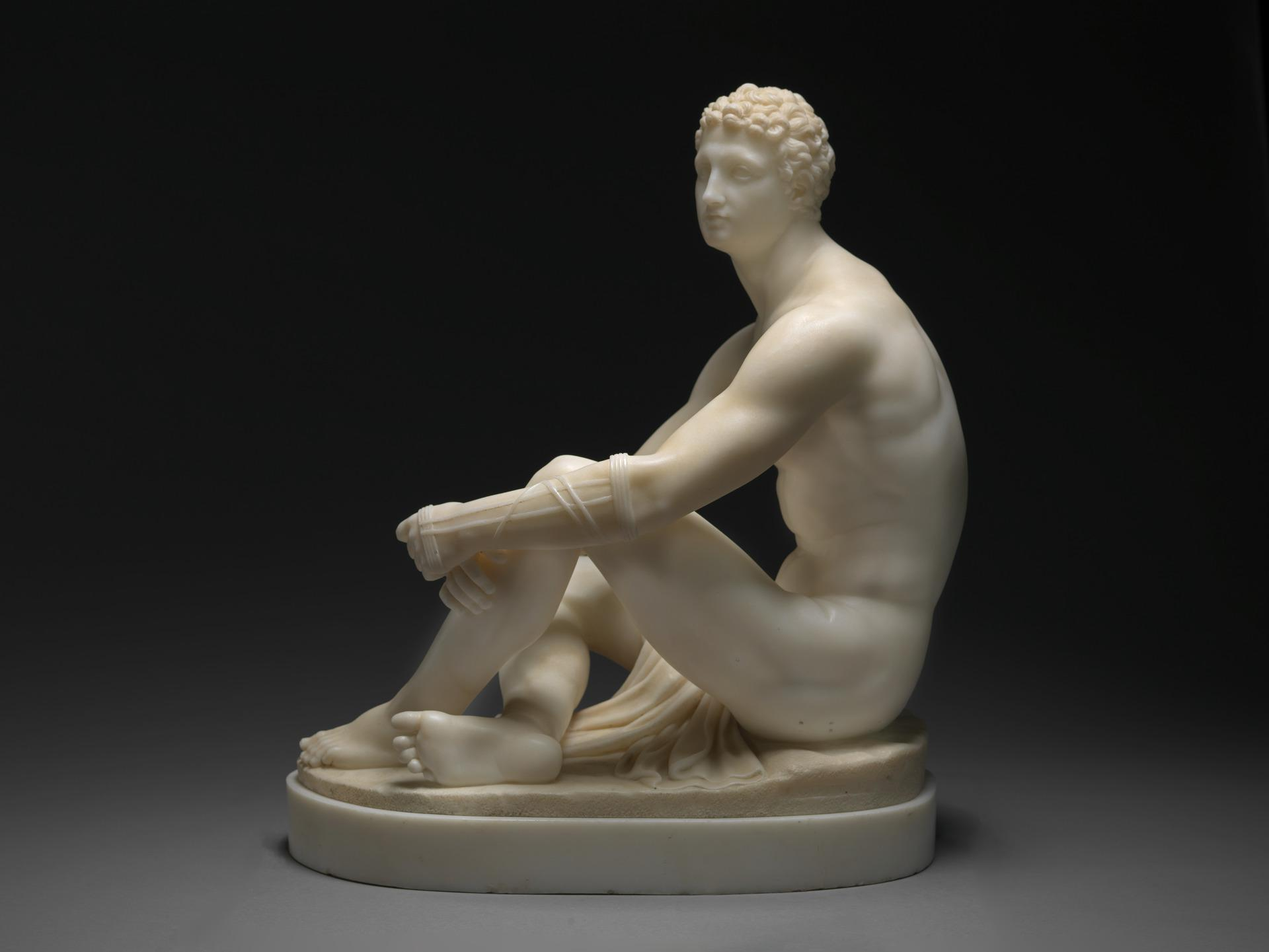
Greek Boxer waiting his Turn by Gott

Joseph Gott (1785 – 8 January 1860) was a British sculptor. His terracotta groups and animal and children pieces were very popular in the 1830s.

== Life ==
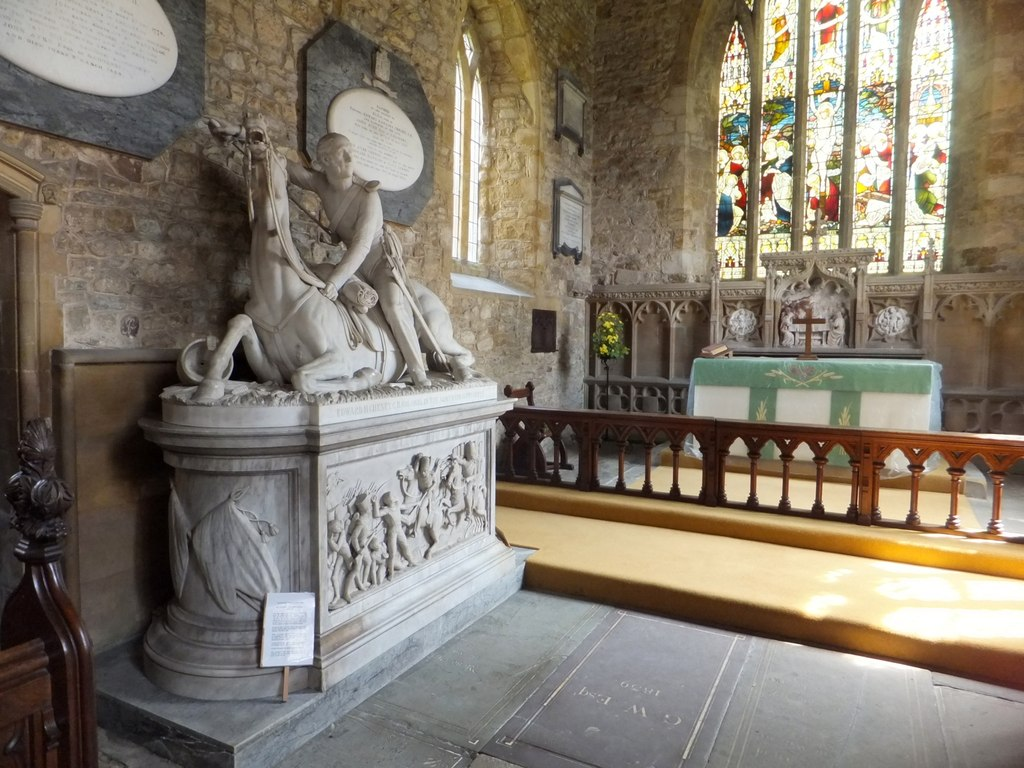
Sculpture of a dying horse and rider, in memory of Col. Edward Cheney in Gaddesby

Gott was born at Calverley near Leeds in 1785, to John Gott, the cousin of industrialist Benjamin Gott, a woollen manufacturer in Leeds and Mayor of Leeds from 1799. Joseph was baptised on 11 December 1785 in London. He did not join the family business of Gott & Sons. He was apprenticed to the eminent sculptor John Flaxman in London from 1798 to 1802. He joined the Royal Academy Schools in 1805. He received patronage from his rich cousin Benjamin Gott and also from George Banks, a wealthy Yorkshireman.

In 1822, Sir Thomas Lawrence gave him a letter of introduction to Antonio Canova in Rome. He did not take this trip immediately and only in 1824 did his father agree to underwrite the cost of his travel and accommodation in Rome. Thereafter he spent most of his remaining life in Rome. His most successful period ended abruptly in 1838 when the cholera epidemic brought an abrupt end to the usually steady stream of British tourists going to Italy on the grand tour. The epidemic killed his children, and his wife's memory was destroyed by the disease. Gott ceased working in 1845 and went into a long depression.

In his early years in Rome he spent some time with young Joseph Severn. From 1828 until death, Gott lived in a large apartment at 155 Via Babuino in Rome (this building still exists).

His most unusual work is the tomb of Col Edward Cheney which depicts him on his dying horse at Waterloo.

He died in Rome on 8 January 1860. He is buried in the Protestant Cemetery, Rome often said to be one of the most beautiful cemeteries in the world. It is noted that he sculpted many of the monuments therein. Here he shares company such as Keats and Shelley.

== Family ==
His grandparents were Issac Gott and Mary (nee Windle). Issac was the brother of John Gott of Wood Hall, Calverley (b 1720, d 1793).

His first wife, Lydia, died in 1838 or soon after. He lost two daughters in the cholera epidemic of 1838. In 1841, in Livorno, Joseph married Anna Drew, daughter of William Drew of Mangotsfield.

== Known works ==
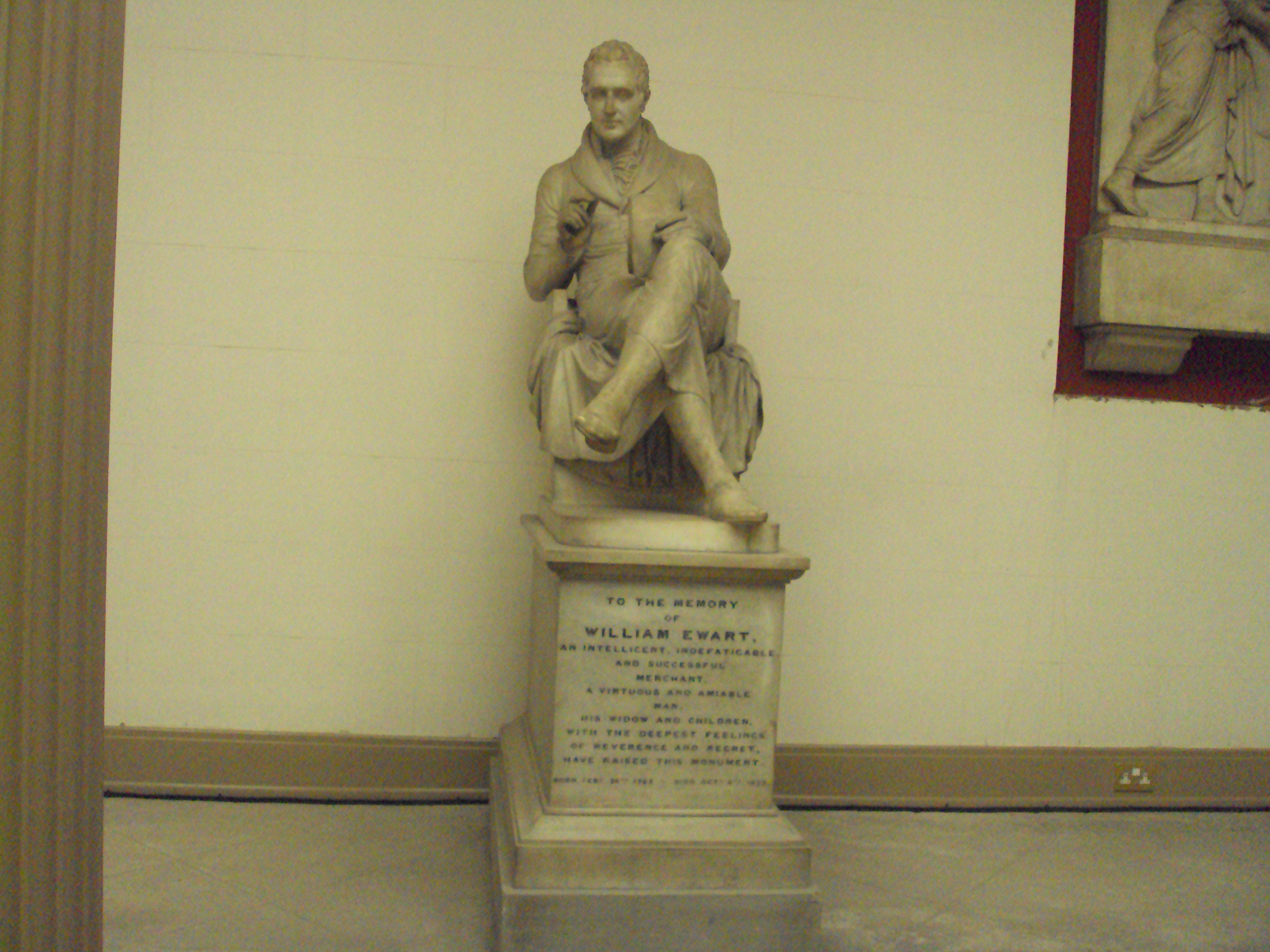
State of William Ewart in Liverpool

- Samson (1805) exhibited at RA
- Jacob Wrestling the Angel (1819) n/k
- Head of Bacchante (1820) Chatsworth House
- Sisyphus (1821) n/k
- Bust of William Hogarth (1824) for Sir Thomas Lawrence
- Dying Spartacus (DNK) Soane Museum, London
- Little Red Riding Hood - Victoria and Albert Museum, London
- Greyhound with Puppies (1825) previously at Normanhurst Court
- Bust of Benjamin Gott his father (1828) Leeds art Gallery
- Pug and Cat (1828) for the Earl of Shrewsbury
- Bust of George Banks (1828) Leeds Art Gallery
- Sleeping Venus (1830) purchased by Sir Thomas Lawrence
- Family Group: Man, Woman and two Children (1830) purchased by Sir Thomas Lawrence
- Female at her Bath (1830) purchased by Sir Thomas Lawrence
- Boy and Greyhound (1831) for Earl Cadogan
- Seated statue of William Ewart (1832) St James' Chapel in Liverpool
- Bust of William Gott his younger brother (1834) Leeds Art Gallery
- Ruth Gleaning (1855) n/k
- Bust of Benjamin Gott (1856) for Leeds Literary Society
- Bust of Christopher Columbus (DNK) Capitoline Museum in Rome
- Bust of Ariadne (DNK) at Chatsworth House
- Bust of John Barran (DNK) Leeds Art Gallery

== Monuments ==
- Monument to Lady Mary Williams in Walton-on-Thames Parish Church (1824)
- Monument to Thomas Fairfax in Gilling Parish Church (1828)
- Monument to Thomas Lloyd (1828) in Leeds Parish Church
- Memorial to 5 year old Emily Cadogan in Durham Cathedral (1830)
- Monument to Mary and Samuel Hartley in Bradford Cathedral (1833)
- Tomb of William Sharp in Bradford Cathedral (1835)
- Tomb of his father Benjamin Gott in Armley Parish Church (1840)
- Tomb of Jonathan Ackroyd in All Saints Chapel in Halifax (1847)
- Monument to Col. Edward Cheney of the Scots Greys, famed for having four horses killed under him at Waterloo in Gaddesby Parish Church (1848)
