= Trevor Barsby =

Australian cricketer (born 1964)

Personal information
- Full name: Trevor John Barsby
- Born: 16 January 1964 (age 62); Brisbane, Australia
- Nickname: Tank
- Batting: Right-handed

Domestic team information
- Years: Team
- 1985–1997: Queensland

Career statistics
Competition	First-class	List A
Matches	111	54
Runs scored	6,913	1,459
Batting average	35.81	28.60
100s/50s	15/35	1/13
Top score	165	101
Balls bowled	96	–
Wickets	1	–
Bowling average	63.00	–
5 wickets in innings	0	–
10 wickets in match	0	–
Best bowling	1/8	–
Catches/stumpings	76/–	15/–
- Source: CricketArchive, 3 February 2023

Trevor John Barsby (born 16 January 1964) is a former Australian first class cricketer who played for Queensland.

Barsby was an aggressive batsman, usually opening and often with Matthew Hayden. He is one of a select group of players to have appeared in 100 Sheffield Shield games for Queensland. This milestone was reached in his last game, the 1996/97 Shield Final. Queensland won the game and their second Shield, Barsby had played a large part in their inaugural championship win two seasons prior with an innings of 151 in the final against South Australia.

Trevor has been recognised for his contribution to Queensland cricket with the Trevor Barsby Oval located at Deagon, Brisbane named in his honour.

He was the Queensland Bulls coach from 2008 until 2010. His daughter Jemma Barsby plays for Queensland Fire and Adelaide Strikers.
