= List of Mexican films of 1945 =

A list of the films produced in Mexico in 1945 given in alphabetical order (see 1945 in film):

== 1945 ==
Title	Director	Cast	Genre	Notes
1945
The Abandoned	Emilio Fernández	Dolores del Río, Pedro Armendáriz, Víctor Junco	Drama	
Adam, Eve and the Devil	Alfredo B. Crevenna	Roberto Soto, Emma Roldán, Enriqueta Reza	Comedy	
Bugambilia	Emilio Fernández	Dolores del Río, Pedro Armendáriz		
Marina	Jaime Salvador	Tito Guízar, Amanda Ledesma, Federico Piñero	Musical drama	
Mischievous Susana	Fernando Cortés	Mapy Cortés, Luis Aldás, Fortunio Bonanova	Musical comedy	
El Monje Blanco	Julio Bracho	María Félix		
The Mulatta of Cordoba	Adolfo Fernández Bustamante	Lina Montes, Víctor Junco, Víctor Manuel Mendoza	Drama	
La Casa de la Zorra	Juan José Ortega	Virginia Fábregas, Isabela Corona, Alberto Galán		
La Selva de Fuego	Fernando de Fuentes	Dolores del Río, Arturo de Córdova		
Me he de comer esa tuna	Miguel Zacarías	Jorge Negrete, María Elena Marqués		
Rosalinda	Rolando Aguilar	María Antonieta Pons, Meche Barba		
Crepúsculo	Julio Bracho	Arturo de Córdova, Gloria Marín		
Bartolo toca la flauta	Miguel Contreras Torres	Manuel Medel, Katy Jurado, Eduardo Arozamena, Hilde Krüger, Esther Luquín		
Hasta que perdio Jalisco	Fernando de Fuentes	Jorge Negrete, Gloria Marín, Eduardo Noriega		
La sombra de Chucho el Roto	Alejandro Galindo	Tito Junco, Leopoldo Ortín, Emma Roldán		
A Day with the Devil	Miguel M. Delgado	Cantinflas, Andrés Soler, Miguel Arenas		
Adultery	José Díaz Morales	Rosario Granados, Julio Villarreal, Hilde Krüger		
Club verde	Raphael J. Sevilla	Emilio Tuero, Emilia Guiú, Celia Montalván		
Como yo te quería		Sara García		
El Capitán Malacara	Carlos Orellana	Pedro Armendáriz, Manolita Saval		
El jagüey de las ruinas		Sara García		
El secreto de la solterona	Miguel M. Delgado	Sara García, Isabela Corona, José Cibrián		
He Who Died of Love	Miguel Morayta	Julián Soler, Luis Aldás, Hilde Krüger		
La señora de enfrente		Sara García		
Lo que va de ayer a hoy	Juan Bustillo Oro, Paulino Masip	Enrique Herrera, Rosario Granados, Miguel Arenas		
Nosotros	Fernando A. Rivero	Ricardo Montalbán, Emilia Guiú, Esther Luquín		
Peach Blossom	Miguel Zacarías	Fernando Soler, Esther Fernández, David Silva		
The Disobedient Son	Humberto Gómez Landero	Germán Valdés, Delia Magaña		
The Hour of Truth	Norman Foster	Ricardo Montalbán, Virginia Serret, Lilia Michel		
The Shack	Roberto Gavaldón	Domingo Soler, Anita Blanch, Amparo Morillo		
Tuya en cuerpo y alma		Sara García		
