= List of Mexican films of 1944 =

This is a list of the films produced in Mexico in 1944, in alphabetical order (see 1944 in film):

== A-D ==
| Title | Director | Cast | Genre | Notes |
|---|---|---|---|---|
1944
| Adiós, Mariquita linda | | | | |
| Alma de bronce | Dudley Murphy | Pedro Armendáriz, Chela Castro | | |
| Amok | Antonio Momplet | María Félix, Julián Soler | | |
| El amor de los amores | | | | |
| Amores de ayer | | | | |
| The Black Ace | René Cardona | Fu-Man-Chu, Manuel Medel, Janice Logan | Mystery | |
| Así son ellas | Gilberto Martínez Solares | Gloria Marín, José Cibrián, Eduardo Arozamena, Rafael Baledón | | |
| Balajú | Rolando Aguilar | Katy Jurado, María Antonieta Pons | | |
| Las calaveras del terror | | | | |
| Caminito alegre | | | | |
| El camino de los gatos | | | | |
| Como todas las madres | | | | |
| Conga bar | | | | |
| El corsario negro | Chano Urueta | Pedro Armendáriz, María Luisa Zea | | |
| La corte de faraón | | | | |
| Cruel Destiny | Juan Orol | María Antonieta Pons, Juan José Martínez Casado, Florencio Castelló | Drama | |
| Cuando escuches este vals | José Luis Bueno | Adriana Lamar, Rafael Banquells, Carlos Villarías | | |
| Cuando quiere un mexicano | Juan Bustillo Oro | Jorge Negrete, Amanda Ledesma, Enrique Herrera | | |
| The Daughter of the Regiment | Jaime Salvador | Mapy Cortés, José Cibrián, Fernando Soto | Musical comedy | |
| Las dos huérfanas | | Susana Guízar, Julián Soler, María Elena Marqués | | |

== E-Z ==
| Title | Director | Cast | Genre | Notes |
|---|---|---|---|---|
| Esclavitud | | | | |
| Escándalo de estrellas | Ismael Rodríguez | Pedro Infante | | |
| Estampas Habaneras | | | | |
| La Fuga | | | | |
| Gran Hotel | Miguel M. Delgado | Cantinflas | | |
| El gran Makakikus | Rogelio A. González | Joaquín Pardavé | | |
| The Headless Woman | René Cardona | David T. Bamberg, Manuel Medel, Manuel Noriega | Mystery | |
| El Herrero | Ramón Pereda | Ramón Pereda, Adriana Lamar, José Baviera | | |
| Los Hijos de Don Venancio | Joaquín Pardavé | Joaquín Pardavé | | |
| Hotel de verano | René Cardona | Ramón Armengod, Tin Tan, Marcelo Chávez, Janice Logan, Pedro Vargas | | |
| Imprudencia | | | | |
| El Intruso | | | | |
| The Lady of the Camellias | Gabriel Soria | Lina Montes, Emilio Tuero, Fanny Schiller | Drama | |
| Lady Windermere's Fan | Juan José Ortega | Susana Guízar, Anita Blanch, René Cardona | Drama | |
| La Leyenda del bandido | | | | |
| Me ha besado un hombre | | | | |
| El Mexicano | | | | |
| Mi lupe y mi caballo | | | | |
| Mi reino por un torero | | | | |
| Michael Strogoff | Miguel M. Delgado | Julián Soler, Lupita Tovar, Anita Blanch, Andrés Soler | Historical drama | |
| Mis hijos | | | | |
| La monja alférez | Emilio Goméz Muriel | María Félix, José Cibrián, Ángel Garasa | | |
| La Mujer sin Alma | Fernando de Fuentes | María Félix, Fernando Soler | | |
| Murallas de pasión | Víctor Urruchúa | Isabela Corona | | |
| María Candelaria | Emilio Fernández | Dolores del Río, Pedro Armendáriz | | |
| El Médico de las locas | Alfonso Patiño Gómez | Adriana Lamar, Ramón Pereda, Carlos López Moctezuma | | |
| My Memories of Mexico | Juan Bustillo Oro | Fernando Soler, Sofía Álvarez, Joaquín Pardavé | Historical musical | |
| Nana | Roberto Gavaldón | Lupe Vélez | | |
| El Niño de las monjas | | | | |
| El pecado de una madre | Ramón Pereda | Adriana Lamar, Ramón Pereda, Carlos López Moctezuma | | |
| La Pequeña madrecita | Joselito Rodríguez | Evita Muñóz "Chachita" | | |
| Porfirio Díaz | | | | |
| El Rey se divierte | | | | |
| Rosa de las nieves | | | | |
| El rosario | Juan José Ortega | Andrea Palma | | |
| San Francisco de Asís | Alberto Gout | José Luis Jiménez, Alicia de Phillips, Camen Molina, Luis Alcoriza, Antonio Bravo, Crox Alvarado | | |
| El Secreto del testamento | | | | |
| El Sombrero de tres picos | | | | |
| Sota, caballo y rey | Roberto Quigley | Luis Aguilar, Meche Barba | | |
| Toros, amor y gloria | | | | |
| La trepadora | Gilberto Martínez Solares | Sara García, María Elena Marqués, José Cibrián, Beatriz Aguirre | | |
| Tribunal de Justicia | | | | |
| La Vida inútil de Pito Pérez | Miguel Contreras Torres | Manuel Medel, Katy Jurado, Emilia Guiú | | |
| Viejo nido | | | | |
| The War of the Pastries | Emilio Gómez Muriel | Mapy Cortés, Pedro Armendáriz, Domingo Soler | Musical comedy | |
| A Woman's Diary | José Benavides | Sofía Álvarez, Luis Aldás, Rafael Baledón | Drama | |
| Yo soy usted | | | | |
