= Fanny Schiller =

Mexican actress (1901–1971)

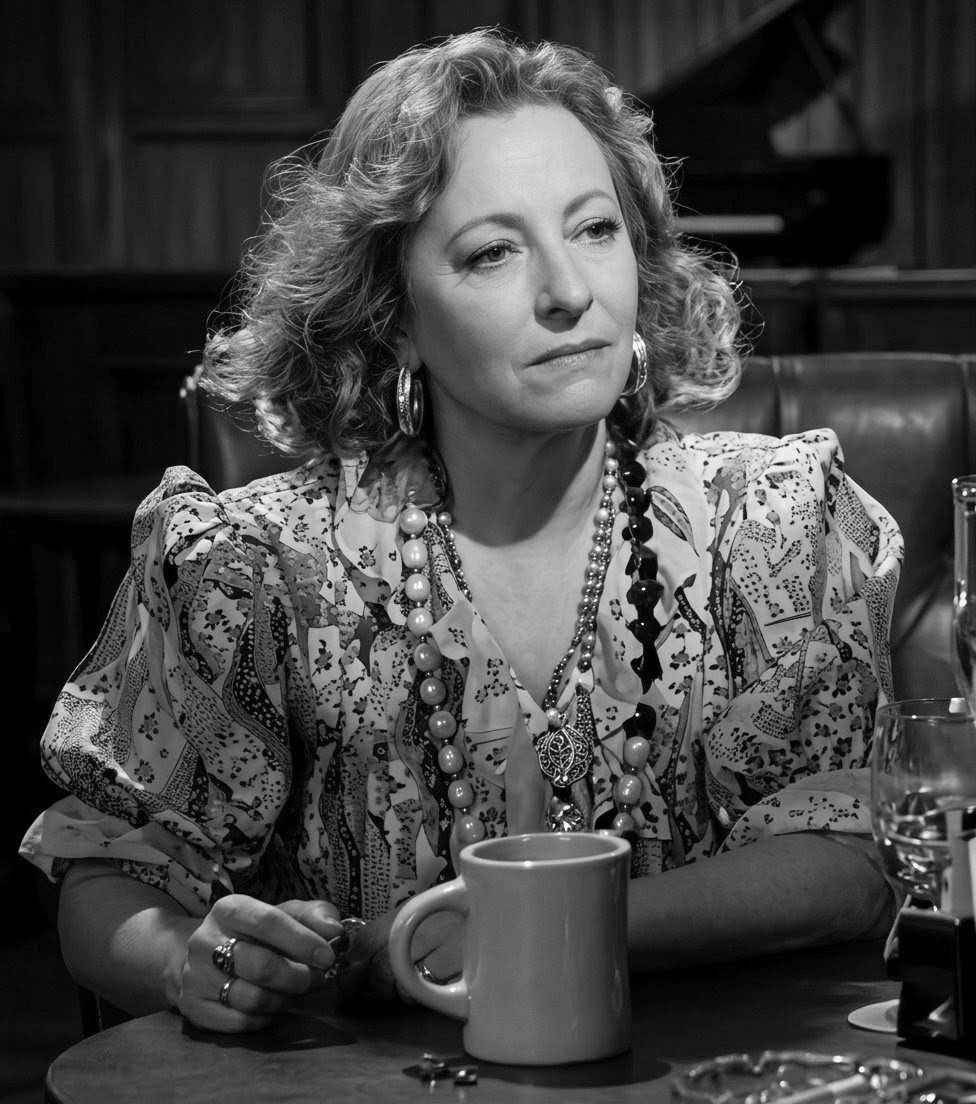
- Fanny Schiller in Canaima (1945)
- Born: Fanny Schiller Hernández; 3 August 1901; Mexico City, Mexico
- Died: 26 September 1971 (aged 70); Mexico City, Mexico
- Occupation: Actress
- Years active: 1921–1971
- Spouse: Manuel Sánchez-Navarro Fábregas
- Children: Manolo Fábregas
- Relatives: Virginia Fábregas (mother-in-law)

Fanny Schiller Hernández (3 August 1901 – 26 September 1971) was a Mexican award-winning character actress and television star, who also acted in operettas and musicals, during the Golden Age of Mexican cinema. She won two Ariel Awards for best supporting actress, and was nominated for two additional films. She was a social activist, creating the Actor's Union and inspiring the creation of “Rosa Mexicano”. She was accomplished at dubbing and was the voice of many animated characters as well as the official voice of several other notable Mexican actresses.

== Biography ==
Fanny Schiller Hernández was born on 3 August 1901 in Mexico City, Mexico. At the age of 20, she began performing in the comedy company of Rosita Arriaga touring around the country. She then worked as a dancer with José María Topete, Consuelo Vivanco, María Conesa, before joining the company of her future mother-in-law, Virginia Fábregas.

She made her starring film debut in the movie El Cristo de oro (The Christ of Gold) with Manuel R. Ojeda in 1926, but did not make another film for approximately ten years. Instead, she was touring the country performing in vaudeville and comedy shows. Most of her film work in the 1940s was completed in Mexico. During the 1950s she worked for several periods in Hollywood.

Schiller was primarily known for character acting, portraying eccentric elderly women. She received a Herald Award for her role in Los cuervos están de luto ("The Crows are in Mourning") (1965) and was nominated four times for an Ariel Award. She won the Ariel Award for Best Supporting Actress twice, in 1947 and 1951.

Schiller was well respected for her work at voice-overs and dubbing; Edmundo Santos, voice director of Disney's releases in Spanish, was so impressed with her that he hired her to dub the Fairy Godmother in Cinderella (1950). She also was the voice of Snapdragon (the purple flower) in Alice in Wonderland, Aunt Sara in Lady and the Tramp, and the fairy Flora in the 1959 version of Sleeping Beauty. In the 1960s she did dubbing work for Hanna-Barbera, and was the voice of Fred Flintstone's mother in the animated series.

In 1955 Schiller ran for a seat in the Chamber of Deputies. This was the first time that women had been eligible to run for office in Mexico and the first time that women in Mexico would be able to participate in a national election, having won the right to vote in 1952. She was defeated, but attended the PRI Civic Day of Mexican Women on April 6, 1955, to celebrate the gains in women's rights.

Shortly before her death, Schiller pushed the National Association of Actors (ANDA) to form nurseries for the children of actresses. Several of her acting friends, including Socorro Avelar, Anita Blanch, Dolores del Río, Irma Dorantes, Gloria Marín, Carmen Montejo, Silvia Pinal, and Amparo Rivelles joined to form a group called 'Rosa Mexicano'. The idea was that by establishing a nursery, actresses could continue working, and by establishing a Montessori education system, their children would receive a strong educational foundation. After operating in temporary spaces, the first stones for the formal location were laid on 30 April 1972, shortly after her death.

== Personal life ==
Schiller came from a family of actors, and her mother was an actress. She married actor Manuel Sánchez-Navarro (1892-1969), son of actress Virginia Fábregas (1871–1950). Their son was actor Manolo Fábregas (1921-1996) and two of Manolo's children are also actors—Mónica Sánchez-Navarro and Rafael Sánchez-Navarro. Schiller died on 26 September 1971 in Mexico City.

== Awards and nominations ==
- 1947: Cantaclaro, Best Supporting Actress, won Ariel Award
- 1947: Las abandonadas, Best Actress co-performance, nominated for Ariel
- 1948: A media luz, Best Supporting Actress, nominated for Ariel
- 1951: La mujer que yo amé, Best Supporting Actress, won Ariel

== Filmography ==
=== Film ===
Year	Title	Role	Notes
1926	El Cristo de oro		
1935	Heroic Silence	Modista	
1935	Rosario		
1937	No te engañes corazón	Refugio	Uncredited
1937	La paloma	Matilde	
1939	Una luz en mi camino	Sra. Bonato	
1940	Herencia macabra	Matilde	
1941	The League of Songs	Doña Gertrudis	
1942	Del rancho a la capital	Doña Consuelo de Rodríguez	
1942	Alejandra	Rita	
1942	Historia de un gran amor	Mesonera	Uncredited
1942	La virgen que forjó una patria	Josefa Ortiz de Domínguez	
1943	Santa	Elvira Gómez	
1943	Cuando habla el corazón	Doña Rosa	
1944	The War of the Pastries	Tía Marietta	
1944	La corte de faraón	Viuda	
1944	The Lady of the Camellias	Prudence	
1944	El rosario	Duquesa	
1944	The Lieutenant Nun	Doña Úrsula	
1944	Mi lupe y mi caballo		
1944	El abanico de Lady Windermere	Duquesa	
1944	Amores de ayer		
1944	El rey se divierte		
1944	Escándalo de estrellas	Paloma	
1945	Las abandonadas	Ninón	
1945	Tuya en cuerpo y alma	Deborah	
1945	Nosotros		
1945	Club verde		
1945	Flor de durazno	Doña Encarnación	
1945	Canaima	Gallineta	
1945	El monje blanco		
1945	Lo que va de ayer a hoy		
1945	He Who Died of Love	Tía Rita	
1945	La casa de la zorra	Invitada a fiesta	
1946	Cantaclaro	Doña Nico	
1946	Palabras de mujer	Doña María, mamá de Fernando	
1946	La viuda celosa		
1946	Bailando en las nubes		
1946	Tú eres la luz		
1946	Sinfonía de una vida		
1946	Por un amor		
1946	Las Colegialas	Leondina	
1946	Ramona		
1946	El último amor de Goya		
1946	Los maridos engañan de 7 a 9		
1946	Pervertida		
1946	Mujer contra mujer		
1947	A media luz	Fru-Fru	
1947	El tigre de Jalisco	Tía de Mary, turista	
1947	Encadenada (El yugo)	Doña Julia	
1948	Adventures of Casanova	Woman who complains in crowd	Uncredited
1948	María la O		
1948	La hermana impura		
1948	La sin ventura		
1948	Que Dios me perdone	Olga	
1948	Señora tentación	Lupe, tia de Blanca	
1948	Algo flota sobre el agua	María Justina	
1948	¡Ay, Palillo, no te rajes!	Tía Isadora	
1948	El gallero	Isabel	
1949	Salón México	Señorita prefecta	
1949	Pobres, pero sinvergüenzas	Señora	
1949	Secreto entre mujeres	Tía Laura	
1949	Bamba	Doña Ofelia de Cacho	
1949	Opio		
1949	La panchita	Doña Martinita	
1949	Las tandas del principal	Doña Romualda	
1949	Nosotros los rateros		
1949	Las puertas del presidio	Madre de Martin	
1950	Duel in the Mountains	Madre de Esperanza	
1950	Black Angustias	Doña Chole	
1950	Cinderella	The Fairy Godmother	Voice role, Latin Spanish dub
1950	Red Rain	Tía de Elisa	
1950	La dama del alba	Aurelia	
1950	Guardián, el perro salvador		
1950	La mujer que yo amé	Magdalena, madre de Rosita	
1950	De Tequila, su mezcal		
1950	Donde nacen los pobres		
1950	Curvas peligrosas	Madre de Esperanza	
1950	Pata de palo	Señora de casade citas	
1951	Una gringuita en México	Tia Rosa	
1951	Crimen y castigo	Mamá de Ramón	
1951	¡Baile mi rey!	Madame	
1951	We Maids	Mamá de Teresa	
1951	Beauty Salon	Doña Susana	
1952	El beisbolista fenómeno	Doña Justa Carmona	
1952	Cuando los hijos pecan		
1952	Sangre en el barrio	Doña Beatriz	
1952	La loca	Señora González de la Cueva	
1952	Angélica	Madre de Arturo	
1952	Por ellas aunque mal paguen	Doña Victoria	
1952	El enamorado	Anfitriona fiesta	
1953	Fruto de tentación	Señorita directora	
1953	The Naked Woman	Violeta Bello	
1953	Sombrero	Doña Fela	
1953	Doña Mariquita de mi corazón	Doña Micaela	
1954	La infame	Victoria	
1954	Lágrimas robadas		
1954	Cantando nace el amor	Doña Ninfa	
1954	El casto Susano	Doña Virtudes	
1954	Mulata	Doña Rosario	
1954	La sobrina del señor cura	Doña Dolores	
1954	Cuidado con el amor	Isabel	
1955	Pecado mortal	Flora	
1955	Historia de un abrigo de mink	Sofía, madre de Camila	
1955	Maternidad imposible		
1955	A Life in the Balance	Carmen Martínez	
1955	Las engañadas	Doña Carlota	
1955	Father Against Son	Tía Domitila	
1955	Lady and the Tramp	Aunt Sarah	Voice role, Latin Spanish dub
1955	The Treasure of Pancho Villa	Laria Morales	
1956	Locura pasional	Doña Jacinta, mamá de Mabel	
1956	Enemigos	Doña Lupe	
1956	A Woman's Devotion	Señora Reidl	
1956	Juventud desenfrenada	Doña Mercedes	
1957	Pablo and Carolina	Señora Cirol	
1957	The Black Scorpion	Florentina	
1958	Tu hijo debe nacer	Enfermera	
1958	The Boxer	Madrastra de Carmen	
1958	El Zorro escarlata en la venganza del ahorcado		
1959	El Zorro Escarlata	La Bruja	
1959	Sleeping Beauty	Flora	Voice role, Latin Spanish dub
1959	La mujer y la bestia	La Mariposa	
1959	The Life of Agustín Lara	Estrella	
1959	Kermesse	Doña Cruz	
1959	El zarco		
1959	El regreso del monstruo	La bruja / Doña Rebeca	
1959	Felicidad		
1959	Escuela de verano	Señorita Rosario	
1959	Una señora movida	Lola	
1960	Poker de reinas		
1960	Por ti aprendí a querer		
1960	Chucho el Roto		
1960	Black Skull	Esposa de Remigio	
1961	El proceso de las señoritas Vivanco	Doña Conchita	
1961	El pandillero	Madame Helene	
1961	Mujeres engañadas	Doña Rita	
1961	Aventuras de Chucho el Roto		
1961	Los jóvenes	Carmelita, Madre de 'El Gato	
1961	La captura de Chucho el Roto		
1962	Genii of Darkness	Rebecca, the witch	
1962	El malvado Carabel	Modista	
1962	The Hooded Men from Hell		as herself
1962	La entrega de Chucho el Roto		
1962	Cielo rojo		
1962	La venganza del resucitado		as herself
1962	El muchacho de Durango	Doña Manuela	
1962	La barranca sangrienta	Doña Blanca	
1962	La emboscada mortal		
1962	El tejedor de milagros		
1963	Alias El Alacrán	Doña Manuela	
1963	La risa de la ciudad		
1963	Jugándose la vida	Graciela	
1963	México de mis recuerdos	Tia Gertrudis	
1963	Baila mi amor		
1963	El norteño		
1965	Love Has Many Faces	Maria	
1965	Los cuervos están de luto	Doña Enedina	
1966	El cachorro		
1966	El temerario		
1967	La muerte es puntual		
1967	Domingo salvaje		
1967	Los alegres Aguilares	Tía Natalia	
1967	Arrullo de Dios	La bruja	
1968	Sor Ye-yé	Mamá de Juan	
1968	María Isabel	Manuela	
1969	No se mande, profe	Headmistress	
1969	No juzgarás a tus padres		
1969	La maestra inolvidable	Teódula	
1970	Estafa de amor		
1970	Crónica de un cobarde		
1970	Rubí	Toña - nana	
1970	Las figuras de arena		
1971	The Fearmaker		
1971	Dos mujeres y un hombre		as herself

=== Television ===
Year	Title	Role	Notes
1952	Crown Theatre with Gloria Swanson		Episode: "Short Story"
1957	Captain David Grief	Mama Gideaux	"Distress Signal" (Season 1, Episode 13)
1958	Más allá de la angustia		
1959	Puerta de suspenso		
1959	Teresa	Eulalia	
1960	Pensión de mujeres		
1963	Tres caras de mujer		
1963	Mi mujer y yo		
1963	Madres egoístas		
1963	Las modelos		
1964	Cumbres Borrascosas		
1965	Un grito en la obscuridad		
1965	La impostora		
1965	Alma de mi alma		
1966	El despertar		
1966	Cristina Guzmán		
1966	Corazón salvaje		
1967	Un pobre hombre		
1967	Engáñame		
1968	Pasión gitana		
1968	Águeda		
1969	No creo en los hombres	Asunción	
1970	La sonrisa del diablo	Toña	
1970	El precio de un hombre		
1971	Velo de novia		
