= Arturo Soto Rangel =

Mexican actor (1882–1965)

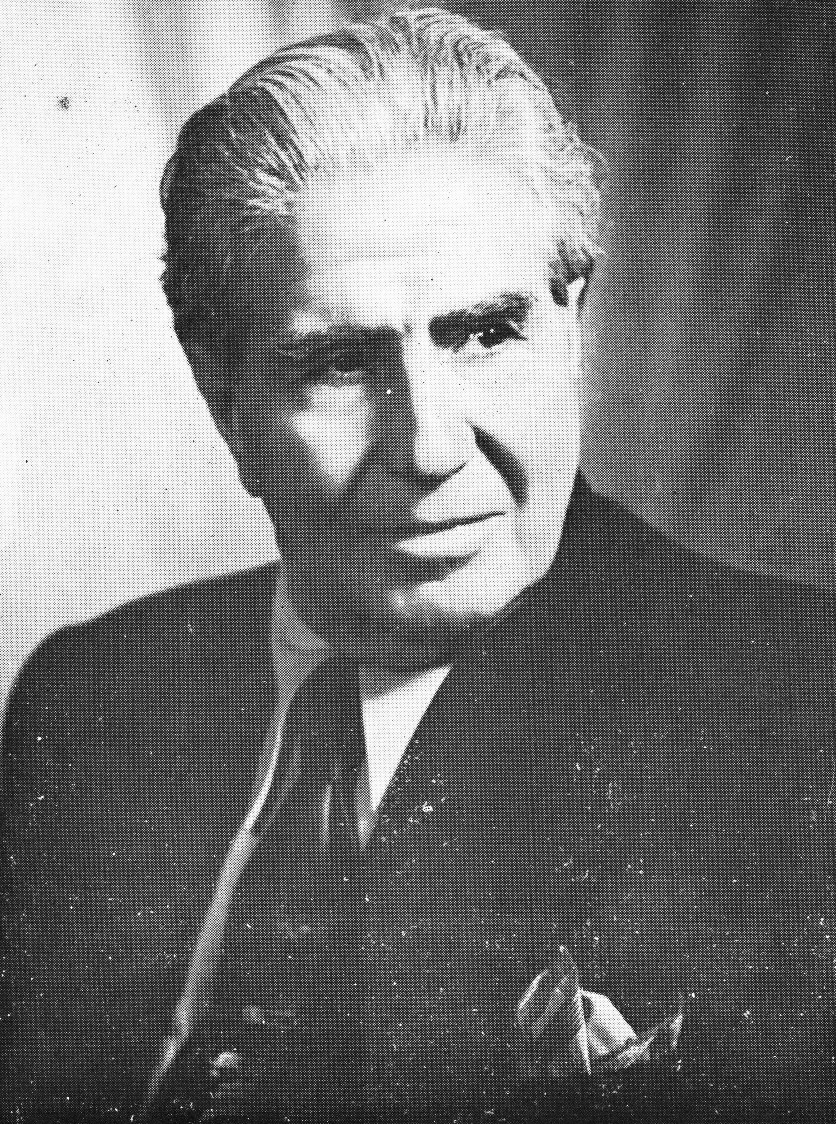
- Arturo Soto Rangel in 1954
- Born: March 12, 1882; León, Guanajuato, Mexico
- Died: May 25, 1965 (aged 83); Mexico City, Mexico
- Other names: A. Soto Rangel; Arturo Rangel; Don Arturo Soto Rangel; Arturo Soto
- Years active: 1938–1963
- Awards: Won Ariel Award for Best Actor in a Minor Role; 1949 Maclovia; Nominated Ariel Award for Best Actor in a Minor Role; 1947 Las Abandonadas

Arturo Soto Rangel (March 12, 1882 – May 25, 1965) was a Mexican film, television, and stage actor. He was best known for appearing in over 250 Mexican films. He appeared in one American movie, The Treasure of the Sierra Madre, which won three Academy Awards and starred alongside Humphrey Bogart, Walter Huston, Tim Holt, Bruce Bennett, and many other successful actors. Soto last appeared on television in 1963, where he starred in Voy de gallo.

== Early life ==
Soto was the only son of Don José Nemesio de Jesús Soto Ornelas born on October 30, 1852, in Ciudad Manuel Doblado, Guanajuato, México, and of a lady whose last name was Rangel. His mother died giving birth and was a widow from a previous marriage. Soto's stepmother was Doña María de la Luz Gordoa Montes de Oca born in León, Guanajuato, México. Arturo had five half-siblings: Ignacio Soto Gordoa, Guadalupe Soto Gordoa, Angelina de la Luz Soto Gordoa, Maria de la Luz Soto Gordoa, and Alfonso Soto Gordoa.

== Career ==
Soto was nominated for the 1947 Ariel Award for Best Actor in a Minor Role for his performance in the film Las Abandonadas and won the Ariel Award for the same category in 1949 for the film Maclovia.

== Personal life ==
Soto had a son whose name is Arturo Soto Ureña. Soto died on May 25, 1965, in Mexico City, Mexico.

== Selected filmography ==
- Los millones de Chaflán (1938) - Notario (uncredited)
- Padre de más de cuatro (1938) - Empleado del hotel
- Hombres de mar (1938) - Don Benjamin
- El capitán aventurero (1939) - Sacerdote (uncredited)
- The Coward (1939) - Doctor
- The Black Beast (1939) - Doctor
- Juntos, pero no revueltos (1939) - Juez
- Corazón de niño (1939) - Señor Crosi
- Los olvidados de Dios (1940) - Alcaide
- Odio (1940)
- El fanfarrón: ¡Aquí llegó el valentón! (1940) - Don Sabas (uncredited)
- Poor Devil (1940) - Ricardo
- ¡Que viene mi marido! (1940) - Señor juez (uncredited)
- Madre a la fuerza (1940) - Santiago
- El secreto de la monja (1940) - Cura
- Con su amable permiso (1940) - Asistente de Plácido (uncredited)
- Amor de mis amores (1940)
- El monje loco (1940)
- Al son de la marimba (1941)
- La torre de los suplicios (1941)
- El insurgente (1941)
- Neither Blood nor Sand (1941) - Juez
- The 9.15 Express (1941) - Papá de novia (uncredited)
- Lo que el viento trajo (1941) - Comisario
- Amor chinaco (1941)
- The Unknown Policeman (1941) - Doctor (uncredited)
- ¡Ay Jalisco, no te rajes! (1941) - Sr. Salas
- El barbero prodigioso (1942) - Señor cura
- Allá en el bajio (1942) - Pancho (uncredited)
- Regalo de reyes (1942) - (uncredited)
- Jesús de Nazareth (1942) - Sacerdote
- Seda, sangre y sol (1942) - Don Manuel
- El conde de Montecristo (1942) - (uncredited)
- La abuelita (1942) - Doctor Bernal
- Águila roja (1942) - Fernando Ontiveros
- Simón Bolívar (1942) - Marqués y Coronel del Toro
- La isla de la pasión (1942) - (uncredited)
- The Eternal Secret (1942) - Coronel (uncredited)
- Historia de un gran amor (1942) - (uncredited)
- La Vírgen morena (1942) - Tío Bernardino
- Beautiful Michoacán (1943) - Licenciado
- La feria de las flores (1943) - Cajero de Dionisio (uncredited)
- La vírgen roja (1943)
- Morenita clara (1943) - Don Juan, abuelo
- Father Morelos (1943)
- Resurrection (1943)
- Land of Passions (1943) - Leoncio Vicencio
- Noches de ronda (1943) - Doctor
- ¡Arriba las mujeres! (1943) - Juez Leobardo
- De Nueva York a Huipanguillo (1943)
- Les Misérables (1943) - Monsignor Bienvenido Myriel
- Doña Bárbara (1943) - Coronel Pernalete
- El ametralladora (1943) - Sr. Salas
- Lightning in the South (1943) - Leonardo Bravo
- Mexicanos, al grito de guerra (1943) - Sandoval, Papá de Luis
- Cuando habla el corazón (1943) - Don Rafael
- San Francisco de Asís (1944)
- María Candelaria (1944) - Doctor (uncredited)
- ¡Viva mi desgracia! (1944) - Don Marcial
- Caminito alegre (1944) - Don Gastón
- La vida inútil de Pito Pérez (1944) - Señor cura
- Viejo nido (1944)
- La mujer sin cabeza (1944)
- La pequeña madrecita (1944)
- El amor de los amores (1944)
- El médico de las locas (1944) - Pedro
- Lady Windermere's Fan (1944) - Parker
- Cuando escuches este vals (1944)
- Porfirio Díaz (1944)
- La trepadora (1944) - Padre Jaramillo
- Amores de ayer (1944) - (uncredited)
- El mexicano (1944)
- Alma de bronce (1944)
- Amok (1944) - Don Eduardo
- Cadetes de la naval (1945) - Indalecio Perez
- Las Abandonadas (1945) - Director colegio
- Tuya en cuerpo y alma (1945) - Obispo de Worcester
- 'Como México no hay dos'! (1945)
- Corazones de México (1945)
- La señora de enfrente (1945) - Padre Juan
- Canaima (1945) - Manuel Ladera
- Bugambilia (1945) - Señor cura
- Caribbean Rose (1946)
- Cantaclaro (1946) - Don Aquilino
- Dizziness (1946) - Padre Moncada
- The Devourer (1946) - Don Manuel Ortega
- El puente del castigo (1946)
- La morena de mi copla (1946)
- Everybody's Woman (1946) - General
- María Magdalena: Pecadora de Magdala (1946) - Joseph
- Su última aventura (1946) - Don Sebastián
- The Queen of the Tropics (1946) - Don Anselmo Gómez
- Los buitres sobre el tejado (1946)
- Guadalajara pues (1946) - Don Atilano
- Enamorada (1946) - Juez (uncredited)
- Fantasía ranchera (1947)
- Yo maté a Rosita Alvírez (1947) - Don Rosendo
- The Prince of the Desert (1947)
- Los cristeros (1947) - Don Ramón Bermúdez
- I Am Your Father (1948) - Don Victorio Fernández
- The Treasure of the Sierra Madre (1948) - El Presidente
- Río Escondido (1948) - Maestro Monroy
- El muchacho alegre (1948) - don Antonio
- Si Adelita se fuera con otro (1948) - Don José Maldonado
- Courtesan (1948)
- El último chinaco (1948) - Padre Ignacio
- The Shadow of the Bridge (1948)
- Adventure in the Night (1948) - Capitán de policía
- Algo flota sobre el agua (1948) - Sabio
- Maclovia (1948) - Don Justo, maestro
- ¡Ay, Palillo, no te rajes! (1948) - Profesor Atenogenes
- La norteña de mis amores (1948)
- Only Veracruz Is Beautiful (1949)
- Dicen que soy mujeriego (1949) - Señor cura
- La vorágine (1949)
- Eterna agonía (1949) - Don Pio
- Cuando baja la marea (1949)
- The Big Steal (1949) - Pedro (uncredited)
- Pueblerina (1949) - Priest
- Dos almas en el mundo (1949) - Dueño de cartera
- El hijo del bandido (1949)
- El embajador (1949)
- Tierra muerta (1949)
- La venenosa (1949) - Dr. Koll
- Rondalla (1949) - Pedro
- Witch's Corner (1949) - Don Pedro
- El seminarista (1949) - Don Pancho
- The Woman of the Port (1949) - Don Antonio Méndez
- Duelo en las montañas (1950)
- Love for Love (1950) - Don Federico
- Tú, solo tú (1950) - Don Ricardo
- The Little House (1950) - Dr. Carrasco
- Sangre torera (1950)
- Matrimonio y mortaja (1950) - Doctor (uncredited)
- Nuestras vidas (1950) - Don Andrés
- Yo también soy de Jalisco (1950)
- The Dangerous Age (1950) - Anciano borracho
- Curvas peligrosas (1950)
- La fe en Dios (1950) - Doctor
- Primero soy mexicano (1950) - Don Matías, señor cura
- La ciudad perdida (1950)
- Un día de vida (1950)
- El Cristo de mi Cabecera (1951) - Padre Cruz
- Víctimas del Pecado (1951) - Director de prisión
- La reina del mambo (1951)
- ¡... Y murío por nosotros! (1951) - Don Júlio, patrón
- Desired (1951) - Don Anselmo
- Los pobres siempre van al cielo (1951) - Director del reformatorio
- Vivillo desde chiquillo (1951) - Juez
- Amor a la vida (1951) - Presidente Juan Vicente Gómez
- Camino del infierno (1951) - Dr. Fausto
- My General's Women (1951) - Don Jelipe
- Monte de piedad (1951) - Padre Gabriel
- Maria Islands (1951) - Miguel
- Love Was Her Sin (1951)
- Radio Patrol (1951) - Sargento Roberto Nava
- El infierno de los pobres (1951)
- Oh Darling! Look What You've Done! (1951) - don Manuel, padre de Margarita
- Con todo el corazón (1952) - Regulo
- Forever Yours (1952)
- Hay un niño en su futuro (1952)
- Dos caras tiene el destino (1952) - Chiclero anciano
- My Wife and the Other One (1952) - Hermenegildo Martínez - padre de Cristina
- Yo soy Mexicano de acá de este lado (1952) - Don Roque Posadas
- A Place Near Heaven (1952) - Don Tenen
- Now I Am Rich (1952) - Zapatero
- The Lie (1952)
- When the Fog Lifts (1952) - Tío Carlos
- Acuérdate de vivir (1953) - Juez (uncredited)
- The Three Perfect Wives (1953) - Francisco
- Sombrero (1953) - Professor
- El lunar de la familia (1953) - (uncredited)
- The Strange Passenger (1953) - Auditor Camacho
- El fantasma se enamora (1953)
- Los dineros del diablo (1953) - Don Teodoro
- Anxiety (1953) - Don Lorenzo
- Dos tipos de cuidado (1953) - Doctor
- Reportaje (1953) - Police secretary who draws naked women
- The Proud and the Beautiful (1953) - Priest
- Garden of Evil (1954) - Priest (uncredited)
- The White Rose (1954) - José María Izaguirre
- La sobrina del señor cura (1954) - Don Ramón
- La entrega (1954) - Doctor Silva
- Ofrenda (1954)
- Un minuto de bondad (1954) - Padre Anselmo
- Si volvieras a mi (1954) - Papá de Alejandra
- Me perderé contigo (1954)
- Sindicato de telemirones (1954) - don Mateo
- El hombre inquieto (1954) - Don Fausto
- Los aventureros (1954)
- Cuidado con el amor (1954) - Don Hilario
- Cain y Abel (1954) - Don Sebastián
- ¡Vaya tipos! (1955)
- Pecado mortal (1955) - Benito
- Frente al pecado de ayer (1955) - Don Eleuterio, abuelo de Lucecita
- The Murderer X (1955) - Padre Juan
- Magdalena (1955) - Maestro de música
- El plagiario (1955)
- La barranca de la muerte (1955)
- El gavilán vengador (1955)
- Una movida chueca (1956) - Doctor
- Historia de un amor (1956) - Señor juez
- Ultraje al amor (1956) - Sacerdote
- El vividor (1956) - Don Benigno
- Besos prohibidos (1956) - Director del penal
- Living Full Out (1956) - Señor cura
- La adúltera (1956) - Juez
- Nos veremos en el cielo (1954)
- El Ratón (1957) - Don Lauro
- Amor del bueno (1957) - don Francisco
- Pablo and Carolina (1957) - Señor Pablo Garza
- La pantera negra (1957) - Don Macario Rosales
- Pepito as del volante (1957) - Pancho
- El caudillo (1957) - Huascapili / Abuelo chon
- Horas de agonía (1958)
- La cama de piedra (1958) - (uncredited)
- Aquí está Heraclio Bernal (1958) - Chuy Bernal
- Cuando Mexico canta (1958) - Señor cura
- Escuela de rateros (1958) - Banquero (uncredited)
- El potro salvaje (1958) - Don Matías
- Una cita de amor (1958) - Sacerdote
- Las tres pelonas (1958) - Don Fernando
- El rayo de Sinaloa (La venganza de Heraclio Bernal) (1958) - Chuy Bernal
- Música de siempre (1958)
- Ash Wednesday (1958) - Notario
- La marca del cuervo (1958)
- Una golfa (1958) - Señor cura
- El jinete negro (1958) - Don Manuel Spindola, notario (uncredited)
- Tres lecciones de amor (1959) - Señor juez
- Pistolas de oro (1959)
- Kermesse (1959) - Señor cura
- El zarco (1959) - Sacerdote
- Acapulqueña (1959)
- El sordo (1959) - Don Moisés
- El que con niños se acuesta.. (1959) - Invitado a hospicio (uncredited)
- El gran pillo (1960) - Comisario (uncredited)
- Los tigres del ring (1960)
- The Miracle Roses (1960) - Bernardino
- Rebel Without a House (1960) - Señor juez
- El tesoro de Chucho el Roto (1960) - Don Pedro
- Las cuatro milpas (1960) - Don Javier
- Herencia trágica (1960) - Notario (uncredited)
- La sombra del caudillo (1960) - Director de la Cooperativa
- Por ti aprendí a querer (1960)
- ¡Qué bonito amor! (1960)
- Revolver en guardia (1960)
- Una pasión me domina (1961) - Abuelo
- El tiro de gracia (1961) - Huascapili / abuelo Chon
- Vámonos para la feria (1961)
- Duelo indio (1961) - Huascapili / abuelo Chon
- Enterrado vivo (1961) - Huascapili / abuelo Chon
- Aventuras del látigo negro (1961)
- El jinete negro (1961) - Don Mateo, juez
- Los encapuchados del infierno (1962) - Señor cura
- El Zorro vengador (1962)
- La venganza del resucitado (1962)
- El látigo negro contra los farsantes (1962) - Don Hermenegildo
- Atrás de las nubes (1962) - Sacerdote (uncredited)
- La barranca sangrienta (1962) - Señor cura
- Voy de gallo (1963)
- La sombra blanca (1963) - (final film role)

== Awards and nominations ==
- 1947 Ariel Award for Best Actor in a Minor Role for Las Abandonadas: Nominated
- 1949 Ariel Award for Best Actor in a Minor Role for Maclovia: Won
