= List of Mexican films of 1972 =

A list of the films produced in Mexico in 1972 (see 1972 in film):

Title	Director	Cast	Genre	Notes
Acherontia	Eugenio Aras	Maria de la Luz Camacho, Laura Patricia Orellana, Benjamín Pineda	Short	
Los adelantados			Short	
Almoloya de Juárez			Short	
Amor y paz			Short	
Con amor de muerte	José María Fernández Unsáin	Jacqueline Andere, Ricardo Blume, Mauricio Garcés, Gregorio Casal		
Mecánica nacional	Luis Alcoriza	Manolo Fábregas, Lucha Villa, Sara García		
La noche de los mil gatos	René Cardona Jr.	Hugo Stiglitz, Zulma Faiad, Christa Linder		
La pequeña señora de Pérez	Rafael Baledón	Julio Alemán, Hilda Aguirre, Enrique Rambal, Héctor Suárez, Patricio Castillo, Maty Huitrón		
El profe	Miguel M. Delgado	Cantinflas, Marga López, Arturo de Córdova		
El festin de la loba	Francisco del Villar	Isela Vega, Milton Rodríguez		
Mi niño Tizoc	Ismael Rodríguez	Alberto Vázquez, Columba Domínguez, Macaria		
Los enamorados	José María Fernández Unsáin	Jacqueline Andere, Ricardo Blume		
La Martina	René Cardona Jr.	Irma Serrano, Rogelio Guerra		
Doña Macabra	Roberto Gavaldón	Marga López, Carmen Montejo, Héctor Suárez, Carmen Salinas		
Hoy he soñado con Dios	Julián Soler	Libertad Lamarque, Jacqueline Andere, Jorge Rivero, Valentín Trujillo, Ana Martín		
Chanoc contra el tigre y el vampiro	Gilberto Martínez Solares	Gregorio Casal, Germán Valdés "Tin Tan, Aurora Clavel, Ramón Valdés		
Un sueño de amor	Rubén Galindo	José José, Verónica Castro, Sasha Montenegro, Marco Antonio Campos "Viruta"		
Triángulo	Alejandro Galindo	Claudio Brook, Ana Luisa Peluffo, Norma Lazareno, Jorge Lavat, Nora Larraga "Karla", Gabriel Retes		
El primer amor	José Díaz Morales	Hilda Aguirre, Fernando Allende, Narciso Busquets		
El deseo en otoño	Carlos Enrique Taboada	Maricruz Olivier, Guillermo Murray, Sonia Furió, Juan Peláez, Silvia Mariscal		
De qué color es el viento	Servando González	Héctor Suárez, Ahui Camacho, Ofelia Medina, Virma González, Enrique Pontón		
El ausente	Arturo Martínez	Valentín Trujillo, Luis Aguilar, Verónica Castro, Patricia Aspillaga		
La gatita	Raúl de Anda Jr.	Jacqueline Andere, Héctor Suárez, Jorge Lavat, Fernando Luján		
La fuerza inútil	Carlos Enrique Taboada	Rafael Baledón, Veronica Castro, Macaria, Roberto Jordán, Silvia Mariscal, Olivia Leyva		
Zindy, el niño de los pantanos	René Cardona Jr.	René Cardona Sr., René Cardona III, Lindy Fields, Tito Junco		Filmed in Guatemala
Tacos al carbón	Alejandro Galindo	Vicente Fernández, Adalberto Martínez "Resortes", Ana Martín		1st Vicente Fernández film.
Todos los pecados del mundo	Emilio Gómez Muriel	Mauricio Garcés, Claudia Islas, Susana Giménez, José Marrone		Co-production with Argentina.
Tonta, tonta, pero no tanto	Fernando Cortés	La India María, Sergio Ramos "El Comanche", Anel, Héctor Herrera, Paco Malgesto		1st India María film.
La verdadera vocación de Magdalena	Jaime Humberto Hermosillo	Angélica María, Carmen Montejo, Rafael Baledón, Emma Roldán		
La criada bien criada	Fernando Cortés	María Victoria, Guillermo Rivas		
La inocente		Sara García		
La otra mujer	Julián Soler	Mauricio Garcés, Saby Kamalich, María Duval		
Nadie te querrá como yo		Hilda Aguirre, Andrés García, Gloria Marín		
The Castle of Purity	Arturo Ripstein	Claudio Brook, Rita Macedo, Diana Bracho		
The Incredible Professor Zovek	René Cardona	Professor Zovek, Germán Valdés, Tere Velázquez		
The Rebellious Novice	Luis Lucia	Rocío Dúrcal, Guillermo Murray, Isabel Garcés	Musical	Co-production with Spain
Victoria	José Luis Ibáñez	Julissa, Guillermo Murray, Enrique Álvarez Félix		

== See also ==
- 1972 in Mexico
