= Lady Windermere's Fan (disambiguation) =

Lady Windermere's Fan is a comedy play by Oscar Wilde.

Lady Windermere's Fan may also refer to the film adaptations of the play :

- Lady Windermere's Fan (1916 film), a British silent comedy film
- Lady Windermere's Fan (1925 film), an American silent film
- Lady Windermere's Fan (1935 film), a German comedy film
- Lady Windermere's Fan (1944 film), a Mexican film
- The Fan (1949 film), an American film

== Other use ==
- Lady Windermere's Fan (mathematics), a telescopic identity employed to relate global and local error of a numerical algorithm
