= The Wicked Carabel (disambiguation) =

The Wicked Carabel (Spanish: El malvado Carabel) is a 1935 Spanish comedy film directed by Edgar Neville.

The Wicked Carabel may also refer to:

- El malvado Carabel, a 1931 comedy novel by Wenceslao Fernández Flórez, adapted to film three times
- El malvado Carabel (1956 film), a film by Fernando Fernán Gómez
- El malvado Carabel (1962 film), a film by Rafael Baledón
