= Perjura =

- Directed by: Raphael J. Sevilla
- Starring: Sara García
- Release date: 1938
- Country: Mexico
- Language: Spanish

Perjura ("Perjured") is a 1938 Mexican romantic drama film directed by Raphael J. Sevilla and starring Sara García.
