= Don't Fool Yourself Dear =

- Directed by: Miguel Contreras Torres
- Produced by: Miguel Contreras Torres
- Starring: Carlos Orellana; Sara García; Mario Moreno «Cantinflas»
- Release date: 20 May 1937 (Mexico)
- Country: Mexico
- Language: Spanish

Don't Fool Yourself Dear (Spanish: No te engañes corazón) is a 1937 Mexican comedy-drama film directed by Miguel Contreras Torres and starring Carlos Orellana. It is the first full-feature film of Mexican comedian Mario Moreno «Cantinflas» after he became a star of the carpa circuit (folk theater). It was also one of the earliest films of Orellana and Sara García and the first where they share the screen.

This film was released in DVD format on October 26, 2004.

== Plot ==
Don Boni (Orellana) is diagnosed with a deadly disease and decides to spend his last days doing good deeds. He leaves his wife and decides to help people. He then gets drunk and wakes up with a winning lottery ticket and realizes that the doctor who diagnosed him has been sent to prison for fraud.

== Cast ==
- Carlos Orellana as Don Bonifacio "Boni" Bonafé
- Sara García as Doña Petronila "Petro" (as Sarah Garcia)
- Natalia Ortiz as Consuelito
- Eusebio Pirrín as Friend of Canti (as Don Catarino)
- Eduardo Vivas as Don Gregorio "Goyo" Vidal
- Mario Moreno «Cantinflas» as Canti
- Carmen Molina as Carmencita
- Joaquín Coss as Señor Rebolledo
- Carlos Villatoro as Alfredo
- Manuel Buendía as Señor Palomares
- Gerardo del Castillo as Friend of Goyo (as G. del Castillo)
- Matilde Corell as Lady Student (uncredited)
- Paco Martínez as Señor Monforte, landlord (uncredited)
- Ismael Rodríguez as Office Worker (uncredited)
- Fanny Schiller as Refugio (uncredited)
- Estanislao Shilinsky as Restaurant Client (uncredited)
- Juan Villegas as Waiter (uncredited)

== Critical reception ==
Introducing an analysis of Cantinflas' career, essayist Carlos Monciváis refers to the actor's performance in this picture as "his disregarded debut in an inauspicious film."
