= Cantaclaro =

- Directed by: Julio Bracho
- Written by: Rómulo Gallegos (novel); Jesús Cárdenas; Julio Bracho
- Produced by: Francis Alstock
- Starring: Esther Fernández; Antonio Badú; Alberto Galán
- Cinematography: Gabriel Figueroa
- Edited by: Gloria Schoemann
- Music by: Manuel Esperón
- Production company: Producciones Interamericanas
- Release date: 29 January 1946
- Country: Mexico
- Language: Spanish

Cantaclaro is a 1946 Mexican drama film directed by Julio Bracho and starring Esther Fernández, Antonio Badú and Alberto Galán. The film is based on the 1934 novel of the same name by Rómulo Gallegos. The film's sets were designed by the art director Jesús Bracho, who was the younger brother of Julio Bracho.

== Plot ==
Florentino (Antonio Badú), nicknamed "Cantaclaro", after saving his family's lands, goes to the plains to learn more songs to sing. There he falls in love with Rosángela (Esther Fernandez), a young woman surrounded by many secrets.

== Cast ==
- Esther Fernández as Rosangela / Angela Rosa
- Antonio Badú as Florentino Coronado Cantaclaro
- Alberto Galán as Doctor Juan Crisostomo Payara
- Paco Fuentes as Juan Parado
- Rafael Lanzetta as Guarriqueño
- Fanny Schiller as Doña Nico
- Rafael Alcayde as Carlos Jaramillo
- Ángel T. Sala as Coronel Buitrago
- Alejandro Ciangherotti as Juan el Veguero
- Maruja Grifell as Nana
- Arturo Soto Rangel as Don Aquilino
- Gilberto González
- Salvador Quiroz
- Roberto Cañedo

== Production ==
The film was made as part of a spate of film adaptations of Rómulo Gallegos's novels following success of Doña Bárbara (1943).

Cantaclaro began filming in June 1945, after Julio Bracho made The White Monk. An American envoy from 20th Century Fox, Francis Alstock, boyfriend of actress Esther Fernández, who starred in the film, featured as executive producer. It features filming locations in Veracruz.

== Reception ==
In Los Bracho: tres generaciones de cine mexicano, Jesús Ibarra states that at the time of the film's premiere, "the critics were divided their opinions and the public did not like it," stating that "despite the beautiful and fluid language, the dialogues were long and the film a bit boring," with Global Mexican Cinema: Its Golden Age citing that "some contemporary critics have generally labeled Cantaclaro, along with most or all of the Gallegos films, 'mediocre'". However, Ibarra also stated that with the film "the same thing happened as with The White Monk; Bracho made art cinema, not suitable for the Mexican public in general", going so far as to argue, when mentioning that the film won fewer Ariel Awards than Emilio Fernández's film Enamorada that year, that Bracho's film was "much more worthy of being awarded" than Fernández's film.
