= Mamá Inés =

- Starring: Sara García
- Distributed by: Medellin-Colombia
- Release date: 1946
- Country: Mexico
- Language: Spanish

Mamá Inés is a 1946 Mexican film. It stars Sara García.
