= Los Santos Reyes =

- Starring: Sara García
- Release date: 1959
- Country: Mexico
- Language: Spanish

Los Santos Reyes ("The Saint Kings") is a 1959 Mexican drama film directed by Rafael Baledón and starring Antonio Aguilar, Antonio Badú, Eulalio González "Piporro", Mary Esquivel and Sara García.
