= No se mande, profe =

- Directed by: Alfredo B. Crevenna
- Starring: Enrique Guzmán and Hilda Aguirre
- Release date: 1969
- Running time: 95 minute
- Country: Mexico
- Language: Spanish

No se mande, profe (Not known to have been distributed in English, but title equates with "Don't Get Fresh, Prof") is a 1969 Mexican film directed by Alfredo B. Crevenna. It stars Enrique Guzmán and Hilda Aguirre.

== Plot ==
Prudish teacher at a girls' school unleashes his wild side when he debuts as a pop singer in his spare time.

== Cast ==
- Enrique Guzmán as Profesor Javier Montiel
- Hilda Aguirre as Beatriz de la Torre
- Sara García as Doña Claudia
- Héctor Suárez as Fausto
- Amadee Chabot as Señorita Nielsen
- Bertha Moss as Señorita Orvañanos
- Renata Seydel as Otilia
- Beatriz Mayo as Juana Villanueva
- Fanny Schiller as Directora escuela
- Claudia Martell as Estudiante
- Sergio Ramos as Doctor
- Queta Lavat as Maestra
- Burdette Zea as Estudiante
- Juan Miranda as Maestro de gimnasia
- Armando Acosta as Operador elevador
- Dolores Camarillo as Fan de Javier
- Queta Carrasco as Mujer con periódico
