= Engáñame =

Mexican telenovela

- Genre: Telenovela
- Country of origin: Mexico
- Original language: Spanish

Original release
- Network: Telesistema Mexicano
- Release: 1967

Engáñame is a Mexican telenovela produced by Televisa for Telesistema Mexicano in 1967.

== Cast ==
- Gloria Marín
- Jacqueline Andere
- Carlos Piñar
- Fanny Schiller
