= Pescadores de perlas =

- Starring: Sara García
- Release date: 1938
- Country: Mexico
- Language: Spanish

Pescadores de perlas (English: Pearl Fishers), also known as Sol de gloria, is a 1938 Mexican film starring Sara García.
