= Yo quiero ser hombre =

- Starring: Sara García
- Release date: 1950
- Country: Mexico
- Language: Spanish

Yo quiero ser hombre ("I Want to be a Man") is a 1950 Mexican film. It stars Alma Rosa Aguirre, Abel Salazar and Sara García.
