= Novia a la medida =

- Directed by: Gilberto Martínez Solares
- Starring: Sara García; Rafael Baledón; Rosita Quintana
- Release date: 1949
- Running time: 90 minutes
- Country: Mexico
- Language: Spanish

Novia a la medida ("Bride to the Measure") is a 1949 Mexican film. It stars Sara García.
