= Dicen que soy mujeriego =

Dicen Que Soy Mujeriego
- Theatrical release poster
- Directed by: Roberto Rodríguez
- Written by: R. Rodríguez, Pedro de Urdimalas, Carlos González Dueñas, R. Steffens
- Cinematography: Jack Draper
- Music by: Manuel Esperón
- Release date: 1949
- Running time: 105 minutes
- Country: Mexico
- Language: Spanish

Dicen que Soy un Mujeriego ("They Say I am a Womanizer") is a 1949 Mexican comedy-drama film directed by Roberto Rodríguez. This Mexican film classic was made during the Golden Age of Mexican cinema. In this film, Mexican superstar, Pedro Infante co-starred with Golden Age Mexican super star Sara Garcia (“Mexico’s grandmother”) as Doña Rosa, as well as with Silvia Derbez as Flor and child star "La Tucita" María Eugenia Llamas (five years old at the time). In this comedy, Pedro Infante is Sara Garcia's (“Doña Rosa”) philandering grandson. Dona Rosa is a prominent rancher. She deeply loves Pedro, but is constantly trying to get him to behave – with no success. While Pedro is ever popular with the ladies, he has his eye on Flor (Silvia Derbez), the niece of a neighboring rancher. Flor flirts with him and plays him off against the disreputable saloon owner and town mayor, Pablo (Rodolfo Landa). Pablo tricks orphan Tucita into believing she is Pedro's daughter as a way to ruin Pedro's chances with Flor. Everyone is quick to believe that Pedro is Tucita's father. However, in the end, the plot is revealed and Pedro and Flor marry.

== The Golden Age of Mexican Cinema ==
This 1949 comic classic was made at the height of the Golden Age of Mexican Cinema (in Spanish: Época de oro del cine mexicano), which is the name given to the period between 1935 and 1959 where the quality and economic success of the cinema of Mexico reached its peak. The golden era is thought to have started with the film Vámonos con Pancho Villa (1935), which is to this date considered the best of the cinema of Mexico. The movie was a box-office failure by Fernando de Fuentes that followed his box-office smash hit Allá en el Rancho Grande. The quality and box-office success of Mexican films continued after the end of World War II when Mexican cinema became focused on commercial films.

== Plot ==
The movie starts with a woman in bed sitting up and shouting in a startled voice, "My husband!" A man hops out of the bed and exits through the bedroom window. He emerges on the street of a Mexican village and heads down the street toward his horse. However, another woman comes up and starts haranguing him about his inattention to her and she ends by calling him a "canalla" (roughly translated, "you rotten louse"). He kisses her hard, which leaves her breathless as her rides off on his horse while she again whispers "canalla". Across the street, a wedding party is emerging from the village cathedral. Outside, the couple invites the priest to accompany them. He declines, saying that he had to go hunting with Doña Rosa (Sara Garcia). If he doesn't' show up, she'll never speak to him again. They then invite him to their wedding reception that evening, which invitation he accepts.

At Doña Rosa's ranch, Dona Rosa discovers that her grandson, Pedro Dos Amantes (Pedro Infante) has stuffed his bed to look like he was sleeping in it. She angrily demands information about Pedro's whereabouts from her rolly-polly servant Bartolo (Fernando Soto), who is also Pedro's constant sidekick in the movie. She punctuates her demands with sharp blows to his posterior with her walking stick. Pedro finally does ride up, his face covered with lipstick. When Doña Rosa demands to know where he has been, he answers that he was at a board meeting. When she asks about the lipstick on his face, he claims it came from eating mangos. She orders him around the side of the ranch house to wash the lip stick off his face.

The priest rides up while Doña Rosa is still ranting that the only decent ones at that ranch were her dogs. The priest greets her with a "very good day" she replies angrily "demons", which shocks him. She immediately apologizes for the outburst. Then, it strikes her that Pedro has not come back from washing his face. Doña Rosa rushes around the corner and finds Pedro trying to get a kiss from servant girl. She whacks Pedro with her cane and runs off the servant girl.

Then, Doña Rosa, Pedro and the priest go hunting for rabbits. Bartolo has conveniently tied out an assortment of them to shoot. Doña Rosa shoots one and Pedro shoots one. Then, Doña Rosa tells the priest that it is his turn. He clumsily aims his shotgun and it goes off wildly. He says he just couldn't bear to shoot one of "God's little animals". However, Bartolo shouts and points out that he had shot a donkey instead. The priest exclaims that things had turned out worse.

Flor, the niece of the neighboring rancher, rides up to say that her uncle was in grave condition and she needed the priest to come. She says the doctor said "there was nothing more he could do for him". Doña Rosa says she would come along, but Flor knew "how he is". Flor nods her agreement. Pedro offers to help in a very suggestive way. She promptly brushes him off. She and the priest ride off.

When they arrive, Pablo, the town's mayor and the shady owner of the town saloon, is there waiting. He repeats that the doctor had said that there was nothing he could do. The doctor enters the room and finds Flor's uncle eating a turkey with great enthusiasm. The priest says he thought the doctor had said there was nothing he could do. The uncle agrees he said that if he did not stop eating, drinking and smoking, he was going to die and there was nothing the doctor could do. However, he would rather live a short life than live a long one hungry and thirsty. He tells the priest that he should join him, since, at their ages, good eating was all they had left. The priest refuses with disgust.

In the room outside, Flor asks Pablo why he has such a look on his face. She says he is the town mayor and asks him what else he could want. He tells her that what he wants is to marry her. She coyly dodges the question. She mentions that she is going to attend the wedding reception that evening. Pablo says he will see her there. She tells him that he would not be welcome there. Pablo vows to attend anyway. They look in on her uncle and the priest and find them both putting away the turkey.

At the wedding reception, Pedro dances with one girl after another, with each getting dumped to her disgust in her turn. He also sings the "They say I am a womanizer" song. Bartolo brings him a mocking letter from "Anonimo", who claims to be his secret admirer. Pedro ponders who she could be. Pablo shows up to the disgust of all in attendance. Flor heads off a bad situation by dancing with him and suggesting that his presence there is not a good idea. He replies that when he says he is going to do something, he does it.

Pedro and Pablo sit together drinking in Pablo's saloon, where the singer and dancer Luciérnaga (Amalia Aguilar) does a fiery dance. One of the bar patron's is so overcome with the moment that he grabs her and kisses her hard. Pedro hops to his feet and decks the offender. Luciérnaga responds by exclaiming, "Thanks handsome." A short time later, she sends Pedro an invitation, though Bartolo, to join her in her room, which Pedro quickly accepts.

Flor flirts with Pablo shamelessly, leading him to believe that he has a chance with her, if he could only get Pedro out of the way. Flor is also Doña Rosa's choice for Pedro. She offers Pedro advice as to how to court her. But, Flor continues to coyly sidestep his advances. In desperation, Pedro publicly drops all his other girl friends by singing his farewell to them from horseback in the village square, singing that they will always remain as a "butterfly in his soul". They all take it badly.

Finally, after a series of misadventures, Pedro does win over Flor and she agrees to marry him. After trying to win her over by singing her a song while she is milking a cow at her ranch (followed by the usual rejection) Pedro tells his sidekick Bartolo to let a bull calf out of its pen to scare Flor. However, always inappropriate, Bartolo lets a full grown bull out of its pen instead, which chases Flor up an apple tree. Pedro ropes the bull from horse back and leads it back to its pen. However, Flor cannot get out of the apple tree and she does not want Pedro looking up her dress, which he would have to do to help her down. He promises to close his eyes but cannot help but take a peek. Furious, Flor starts to throw apples at him, which causes her to fall out of the tree. Pedro rushes to her aid, but finds her apparently unconscious. Pedro kisses her and she comes to. He starts to explain that he was only trying to give her artificial respiration, but she unexpectedly kisses him back. And thus begins their romance.

However, when Pablo hears of this development, he is outraged and swears that he is going to do something about it. Luciérnaga means "firefly" in Spanish. When Pedro goes to Luciérnaga to tell her that he cannot see her any more, she tells Pedro that she expects him to marry her. Pedro quickly ends his relationship with her. Luciérnaga tells him that "fireflies also have stingers" and swears to herself that he is going to pay. Luciérnaga goes to Pablo, who has just gotten word of Flor's engagement to Pedro, to ask him, as town mayor, to lock up Pedro for the shameful way he had treated her. At which point, he tells her that he has a better idea.

That evening, the small child, Tucita shows up on Dona Rosa's mare at the entrance to her ranch. When Dona Rosa asks Tucita tenderly what she is doing on her mare, Tucita says her mother told her that Dona Rosa was her “granny”. Dona Rosa lovingly takes Tucita from the mare and takes her into the ranch house. She sets her down and gets Tucita to show her a letter she is carrying from Tucita's “mother”, which says that Tucita is Pedro's daughter. The letter is signed “your victim”. The clincher is that Tucita has a photo of Pedro on a string around her neck. Dona Rosa needs little convincing. She strokes Tucita's hair lovingly and tells Tucita that she “alone is the victim”.

At this point, Pedro comes home leading a band and roaring drunk, celebrating his engagement to Flor. Dona Rosa runs off the band and drags Pedro into the house to meet Tucita, telling him that she has a “little present” for him. Inside, Tucita wants to know why the music stopped. Pedro answers that it is because "Grandmother doesn't want it." Then, he realizes that he is talking to a small child. There is then both a humorous and sadly touching scene in which Tucita immediately takes to Pedro as her father, while Pedro tries to figure out what is going on through a drunken haze. He asks Tucita who she is. Tucita addresses him as “papa”. Pedro is very confused by Tucita's presence and asks Dona Rosa if she is being serious. She assures him that she is. Dona Rosa and Pedro show Tucita photos of all Pedro's lady friends, but Tucita does not identify any as her mother. Pedro counts his fingers, considers which lady friends he had seen about the time of Tucita's conception and decides that he could not possibly be Tucita's father – a conclusion Dona Rosa angrily rejects.

Honorably, Dona Rosa goes to Flor right away and tells her about Tucita. Flor asks her who is Tucita's mother. Dona Rosa responds that perhaps it is true that Pedro does not even know himself. Flor, deeply hurt, is also quick to believe it and angrily breaks off her engagement with Pedro. Flor goes to Dona Rosa's ranch to see Tucita for herself. She finds Tucita at the well scolding her puppy "Pulgacita" (small flea) for being a womanizer. Throughout the movie Tucita repeats to her puppy a lot of what she hears the adults around her saying as a way of showing the viewers how impressionable she is. Flor lifts Tucita to the well and Tucita shows her the photo of her "father" on the string around her neck. Flor tells her tearfully that she cannot "struggle" against her. Pablo later approaches Flor to try to tell her that he could not possibly be Tucita's father. However, Flor will not listen, which makes Pablo very angry and frustrated. He tells her, "You condemn without listening to me" and stomps off.

The disreputable Pablo then makes a big play for Flor, even suggesting that she should marry him out of “spite”, as a way to get back at Pedro. He tells her, if that is the reason she marries him, he would accept it. She puts him off.

Pedro gets very upset that Dona Rosa will not believe him when he says he is not Tucita's father. He stomps out, with Dona Rosa yelling after him not to leave. He goes on a drunken binge, finally coming home drunk and singing for forgiveness in the courtyard of Dona Rosa's ranch. At the end of the song, Dona Rosa goes out and brings him in. She then agrees that she should not have been sticking her nose in Pedro's affairs. She agrees to help him win Flor back. Together, they go over to Flor's where in a buggy Pedro sings for Flor to take him back. She waivers, but in the end cannot bring herself to take him back. However, later and after much struggling with the decision, Flor does reject Pablo and tells him that she is going to marry Pedro anyway, despite everything.

About this time, his sidekick, Bartolo comes to Pedro and tells him that he has discovered what has happened. He tells Pedro that Luciérnaga had pretended to be Tucita's mother. Not only that, Pablo's henchmen had her under guard to keep her quiet. Pedro frees her and she tells Pedro that Pablo had taken Tucita from an orphanage, had her pretend to be Tucita's mother, thereby duping Tucita into thinking she was Pedro's daughter. She then sent Tucita off to Dona Rosa's ranch to unwittingly frame Pedro. Pedro confronts Pablo and they fight. Pablo ends up in a lake and starts to drown. Pedro nobly swims out and saves him.

In the last scene of the movie, Pedro and Flor come out of the village cathedral after their marriage. However, just outside the cathedral his sidekick Bartolo hands him another note from Anonimo. He tries to tell Bartolo that his timing was very bad and Dona Rosa asks Pedro if he is sorry for his previous interest in Anonimo. Before he can answer, Flor pipes up that she is Anonimo. Yet, even at this moment when all seems to be resolved, Pedro pays too much attention to a passing beauty by exclaiming “Válgame Dios (roughly translated "Heaven Help Me!")”. Tucita then also exclaims from the wedding party “Válgame Dios!” – showing one and all that despite her non-granddaughter status, she has not lost her place in Dona Rosa's home or heart. Dona Rosa then drags an unreformed Pedro off by the ear as the movie ends.

== Pedro Infante, Sara Garcia and María Eugenia Llamas. ==
Pedro Infante is said by many to have been the greatest Mexican actor and singer of all times. As Mexican American author, Denise Chavez, in her book "Loving Pedro Infante" put it humorously, "If you're a [Mexican], and don't know who he is, you should be tied to a hot stove with a yucca rope and beaten with sharp dry corn husks as you stand in a vat of soggy fideos. If your racial and cultural background ethnicity is Other, then it's about time you learned about the most famous of Mexican singers and actors."

He starred in many Golden Age movies. He introduced many Mexican songs that remain classics today. Some of his most popular songs include: Amorcito Corazón (approximately My Little Love and Heart), Te Quiero Así (I Love You Like This), La Que Se Fue (She Who Left), Cielito Lindo on YouTube (Beautiful Little Darling), Corazón (Heart), El Durazno (The Peach), Dulce Patria (Sweet Fatherland), Maldita Sea Mi Suerte (Cursed Be My Luck), Así Es La vida (Life Is Like This), Mañana Rosalía (Tomorrow Rosalía), Mi Cariñito (My Little Darling), Dicen Que Soy Mujeriego (They Say I Am A Womanizer), Carta a Eufemia (Letter to Eufemia), Nocturnal, Cien Años (Hundred Years), Flor Sin Retoño (Flower Without Sprout), Pénjamo, and ¿Qué Te Ha Dado Esa Mujer? (What Has That Woman Given You?). He sang "Mi Cariñito" on YouTube to his frequent on screen grandmother, Sara Garcia, so many times in so many of their movies together, that it was played at her funeral. The world-famous song Bésame Mucho ("Kiss Me a Lot", or more loosely translated to get its elusive Spanish meaning closer to its English meaning, "Smother me with Kisses"), from the composer Consuelo Velázquez, was the only melody that he recorded in English and he interpreted it in the movie A Toda Máquina (ATM) (At Full Speed), with Luis Aguilar.

Sara Garcia starred in numerous very popular movies before and after this one, in which she often played the part of a loveable, but no-nonsense grandmother. She came to be known as "Mexico's grandmother." Sara Garcia, María Eugenia Llamas and Pedro Infante maintained a cordial relationship for the following ten years, until his untimely death on April 15, 1957. Pedro Infante was an avid pilot. He was piloting his own multiengine plane to Mexico City, when it crashed shortly after takeoff from Mérida, Yucatán causing his tragic death, along with the deaths of his co-pilot and the engineer. Pedro Infante is still widely honored in Mexico, much like Elvis Presley is in the United States. They still call him “The Idol”. Further, like Elvis Presley, some people are so unaccepting of his death that they maintain that he faked his death and is still alive. Golden Age star Sara Garcia died, at the age of 85, on November 21, 1980 in Mexico City after she fell down some stairs, fatally striking her head.

María Eugenia Llamas was only five when she played this part. She was nominated for the Premio Ariel Mexicano (Mexican equivalent of the Oscar) for her role in this movie, but did not win. María Eugenia Llamas did finally win the Ariel Award in 1952 for her role in her much less remembered 1950 movie, “Los Niños Miran al Cielo (The Children Look to Heaven).” María Eugenia Llamas went on to star in other movies both as a child and as an adult, but she is less well remembered for them. She is now a widow and grandmother. She lives in Monterrey, Mexico. Every public mention of her is always followed by her childhood screen name of "La Tucita."

== Cast ==
- Pedro Infante (Pedro)
- Sara García (Doña Rosa)
- Silvia Derbez (Flor)
- Fernando Soto "Mantequilla" (Bartolo)
- María Eugenia Llamas (La Tucita)
- Rodolfo Landa (Pablo)
- Amalia Aguilar (Luciérnaga)
- Arturo Soto Rangel (Cura)
- Juan Pulido (Maximino)
- Salvador Quiroz (Doctor)
- Rosa María Montes
- Virginia Retana
