= El papelerito =

- Directed by: Agustín P. Delgado
- Written by: José G. Cruz (screenplay), José G. Cruz (story)
- Starring: Sara García, Domingo Soler, Jaime Jiménez Pons
- Cinematography: Enrique Wallace
- Edited by: Jorge Bustos
- Music by: Gonzalo Curiel
- Release date: 25 October 1951
- Running time: 98 minutes
- Country: Mexico
- Language: Spanish

El papelerito is a 1951 Mexican film. It stars Sara García, Domingo Soler and Angel Calpi.

== Plot ==
In the suburbs of Mexico City, a very poor but loving family depends on the work of all of the members. Doña Dominga, the matriarch, works in a small food stand which is very successful. Don Simón, the patriarch, is a shoeshiner. The rest of the family consists of four rooted children, Juancho, Toñito, Pirrín and Gloria who are very happy despite their poverty and Gloria's handicapped condition. Toñito, Pirrín and Juancho work as paperboys and sell the prestigious newspaper Excelsior. As they make their way along the city, they encounter policemen and are very much into the whole rogue lifestyle. They however, have an enemy in El Mono, a roguish and violent boy who beats Toñito up since he believes only he should sell his newspapers in the area. When El Mono beats Toñito, Pirrín and Juancho help him fight back.

Toñito's mom, Elvira, has no interest in forging a relationship with her son. Doña Dominga hates this and tries to make Toñito feel loved. Elvira encounters her criminal boyfriend, Paco, who fled a robbery. Toñito saw Paco flee and Paco demands Toñito remain inside the apartment until he can escape. After Juancho and Pirrín discover this they talk about how to help Toñito. Unfortunately El Mono overhears this and decides to use this information to get back at all of them. Paco is trying to evade justice but is discovered by the police, tipped off by El Mono. Toñito is around when this happens, and wants to be with Elvira. Elvira's feelings as a woman however, are stronger than those of motherhood and she chases Paco who is trying to elude the police. Adamant about avoiding capture, he starts shooting the policemen who in turn, shoot and kill him. Unfortunately they also shoot Toñito in the crossfire. Elvira, shocked by Toñito's shooting, is captured and sent to jail. Pirrín and Juancho try to help put Toñito who is sent home with his adoptive family. To see if he can help Toñito Juancho buys a medicine book. As the days pass, Toñito tells everyone he wants to buy his mom flowers for Mother's Day. In the meantime, El Mono convinces another boy to stage a fight with Pirrín so he can steal Doña Dominga's earnings. This causes a delay and Toñito is forced to work once more. Nevertheless, as it rains strongly he gets sick and is later very ill. The doctor who sees him tells everyone to get an oxygen tank and injections. Juancho sells his book for the injections and Doña Dominga seeks the oxygen tank to help him recover, but unfortunately while she is away Toñito dies. Before dying, Elvira is told and she tearfully exclaims she is guilty for her son's death. Pirrín gives her the kiss and Doña Dominga, Don Simón, Gloria and Pirrín try to continue their life. Later on, El Mono tries convincing his accomplice to help him rob the newspaper publisher but his accomplice refuses. Furious, El Mono decides to act alone and assaults and kills the cashier but is quickly captured by Pirrin and Juancho and is sent to jail. As a reward, the chief executive gives Doña Dominga a brand new stand and scholarships for Pirrín and Juancho for their education.
