= Sólo para maridos =

- Directed by: Fernando Soler
- Written by: Joaquín Abati and Antonio Paso (play)
- Starring: Sara García
- Release date: October 12, 1955
- Running time: 80 minutes
- Country: Mexico
- Language: Spanish

Sólo para maridos ("Only for Husbands") is a 1955 Mexican romantic comedy film directed by Fernando Soler for Cinematografistas Mexicanos Asociados. It is based on a play by Joaquín Abati and Antonio Paso. The film stars Manolo Fábregas, Alicia Caro, Fernando Soler and Sara García.
