= Mi mujer y yo =

Mexican telenovela

- Genre: Telenovela
- Country of origin: Mexico
- Original language: Spanish

Original release
- Network: Telesistema Mexicano
- Release: 1963

Mi mujer y yo is a Mexican telenovela produced by Televisa for Telesistema Mexicano in 1963.

== Cast ==
- Enrique Rambal
- Lucy Gallardo
- Luis Aragón
- Fanny Schiller
- José Galvéz
- Martha Patricia
- León Barroso
- Rafael del Río
- Augusto Benedico
