= The Human Octopus =

- Starring: Sara García
- Release date: 1934
- Country: Mexico
- Language: Spanish

The Human Octopus (Spanish: El pulpo humano) is a 1934 Mexican film. It stars Sara García.
