= Yo soy tu padre =

1927 film

- Directed by: Juan Bustillo Oro
- Written by: Juan Bustillo Oro, Maurice Leblanc
- Starring: Agustín Carrillo de Albornoz, Graciela Ortega, Quintín Gutiérrez, Sara García
- Release date: 1927
- Running time: 88 minutes
- Country: Mexico
- Language: Silent

Yo soy tu padre ("I am Your Father") is a 1927 Mexican silent film directed by Juan Bustillo Oro. It features Sara García as an extra.

== Plot ==
Don César is an unemployed man who agrees to help a young man by posing as a father for a day, in order that the father can give his consent to marriage. Don César becomes difficult to rid of.

== Cast ==
- Agustín Carrillo de Albornoz
- Graciela Ortega
- Quintín Gutiérrez
- Sara García
- Alberto Miguel
- Carmen Torres
- Celia Valdés
