= El hijo del pueblo =

- Starring: Sara García
- Release date: 1974
- Running time: 91 minute
- Country: Mexico
- Language: Spanish

El hijo del pueblo ("The Son of the Village") is a 1974 Mexican film. It stars Sara García.

== Plot ==
A taxi driver falls in love with a radio announcer who cheats on him at a party. He returns to his hometown (Huentitán el Alto) to live with his grandmother on his small ranch between Atenguillo and Ameca, Jalisco. One day, a small plane crashes, and the taxi driver rescues the passengers and takes them to his ranch. They remain there for a while, as they cannot contact the nearest town due to the ranch's remote location. These passengers are privileged children, unaccustomed to farm work, such as waking up early at the rooster's crow, milking cows, and feeding chickens and pigs. The film highlights the stark social class differences between the two groups.
