= Toni (1935 film) =

- Original Movie Poster
- Directed by: Jean Renoir
- Screenplay by: Jean Renoir (uncredited); Carl Einstein (uncredited)
- Story by: Jacques Levert
- Produced by: Pierre Gaut
- Starring: Charles Blavette; Celia Montalván; Jenny Hélia; Édouard Delmont; Max Dalban
- Cinematography: Claude Renoir
- Edited by: Marguerite Renoir; Suzanne de Troeye
- Music by: Paul Bozzi
- Production company: Films Marcel Pagnol
- Distributed by: Films Marcel Pagnol
- Release dates: 22 February 1935; 4 November 1936 (USA)
- Running time: 80 mins.
- Country: France
- Languages: French; Italian; Spanish

Toni is a 1935 French drama film directed by Jean Renoir and starring Charles Blavette, Celia Montalván and Édouard Delmont. The credits mention no writers other than the story writer Jacques Levert, but the script was later confirmed to be authored by Renoir and Carl Einstein. It is an early example of the casting of non-professional actors and on-location shooting - both of which would influence the Left Bank of the French New Wave movement. Examining the romantic interactions between a group of immigrants (both from abroad and other parts of France) working around a quarry and a farm in Provence, it is also generally considered a major precursor to the Italian neorealist movement, for its concerns on the working class, use of non-professional actors and on-location shooting.

Although Toni is not among Renoir's most famous works, it continues to receive positive reviews from critics.

== Plot ==
Looking for a job Toni goes from Italy to Southern France. A local woman named Marie takes him in as her tenant and becomes his lover. But when the Spanish guestworker Josepha comes to town, Toni falls for her. To his disappointment Josepha falls for Albert, an educated and wealthier man from the northern France. Albert/Josepha and Toni/Marie have a double wedding, but Toni cannot hide that Josepha is still his great love. After Marie has thrown him out of her house his obsession with Josepha grows even more pronounced. Toni spends his time observing Josepha's house from a hut in the mountain. Albert becomes increasingly more abusive, so Josepha and her paramour Gabi decide to steal some money and run away. Albert catches her in the act and cruelly beats her, and she in revenge kills him with his gun. Meanwhile, Toni finds out the plan from Gabi and forces Gabi to go with him to check on Josepha. Seeing Josepha in trouble, Gabi takes the money and runs away, leaving Toni with Josepha. Toni sacrifices himself in order to cover up for her. He runs to meet with Josepha in an agreed location, but is shot dead before he can reach there.

== Cast ==
- Charles Blavette as Antonio 'Toni' Canova
- Celia Montalván as Josefa
- Édouard Delmont as Fernand
- Max Dalban as Albert
- Jenny Hélia as Marie
- Michel Kovachevitch as Sebastian
- Andrex as Gabi
- Paul Bozzi as the guitar player

== Production ==
Filming was based out of Marcel Pagnol's studios in Marseille and shot entirely on location in the South of France.

Some literature indicates that Luchino Visconti, one of the founding members of the neo-realist film movement, had worked as assistant director on the film, although this is disputed. Most recent scholarship seems to agree that Visconti first worked with Renoir in 1936 on A Day in the Country.

== Reception ==
Toni has received positive reviews from critics since its release. On the review aggregator website Rotten Tomatoes, 100% of 12 critics' reviews are positive, with an average rating of 7.7/10. The acclaimed filmmaker Wes Anderson has named Toni as a favorite film of his. In April 2019, a restored version of the film was selected to be shown in the Cannes Classics section at the 2019 Cannes Film Festival.

== Bibliography ==
- O'Shaughnessy, Martin. Jean Renoir. Manchester University Press, 20 Oct 2000.
