= Mi madrecita =

- Starring: Sara García
- Release date: 1940
- Country: Mexico
- Language: Spanish

Mi madrecita ("My Dear Mother") is a 1940 Mexican film. It stars Sara García.
