= Nos dicen las intocables =

- Starring: Demetrio González, Manuel López Ochoa, Irma Dorantes, Lola Casanova, Sara García
- Release date: 1964
- Country: Mexico
- Language: Spanish

Nos dicen las intocables ("We Say Untouchable") is a 1964 Mexican film starring Demetrio González, Manuel López Ochoa, Irma Dorantes, Lola Casanova and Sara García.
