= Por el mismo camino =

- Starring: Sara García
- Release date: February 11, 1953
- Country: Mexico
- Language: Spanish

Por el mismo camino ("On the Same Road") is a 1953 Mexican film starring Sara García.
