= Nadie te querrá como yo =

- Starring: Sara García
- Release date: 1972
- Running time: 87 minute
- Country: Mexico
- Language: Spanish

Nadie te querrá como yo ("No One Will Love You Like Me") is a 1972 Mexican film.

It stars Hilda Aguirre as Isabel Carrasco, Andrés García as Javier, Gloria Marín as Señora Carrasco, Isabel's mother, and Sara García as her grandmother.
