= Celia Montalván =

Mexican actress

- Born: 1899; Mexico City, Mexico
- Died: January 10, 1958 (aged 58–59); Mexico City, Mexico
- Occupation: actress

Celia Montalván was a Mexican actress and soprano, who had a major impact on the development of Mexican cinema and photography.

== Biography ==
Celia Montalván was born in August 1899 in Mexico City, Mexico.

Her stage debut took place alongside Aurora Walker in the duo "Las Walkirias". They received their first theatrical roles in the play Las Corsarias.

In 1920, she made her debut as a prima donna. She quickly gained popularity and postcards were printed with her image, breaking sales records for that time, especially after her success at the Revista Theater.

The further step in Montalván's career was her appearances in theatrical revues like ¡Ra-Ta-Plan!

She then turned her focus toward cinema and she had a hit with El milagro de la Guadalupana in 1925. She became the first Mexican woman to film in Europe.

In 1929 she began acting in Hollywood, and appeared in the Rodriguez brothers' lost film Sangre mexicana (1931). In 1935, she starred in her most famous film, Toni, directed by Jean Renoir.

== Filmography ==
- El milagro de la Guadalupana (1925)
- Don Juan diplomático (1931)
- El proceso de Mary Dugan (1931)
- Sangre mexicana (1931)
- Toni (1935)
- Club Verde (1945)
