= Sucedió en Jalisco (Los cristeros) =

Sucedió en Jalisco (Los Cristeros)
- Directed by: Raúl de Anda
- Written by: Raúl de Anda; José Guadalupe de Anda
- Starring: Sara García
- Release date: 1947
- Country: Mexico
- Language: Spanish

Sucedió en Jalisco (Los Cristeros) ("It Happened in Jalisco (The Cristeros)") is a 1947 Mexican film written and directed by Raúl de Anda based on the novel Los Cristeros by José Guadalupe de Anda. It stars Sara García and portrays the drama of a love triangle during the Cristero War.

== Legacy ==
The filmmakers took a great risk in the making of the film as, despite the liberalism towards Catholicism in the post-Calles era, the Mexican government restricted coverage of the Cristero War and the conflict was largely covered up.

A remake was made in 1972 which Raúl de Anda also directed. This version was based in part on the novel Sucedió en Jalisco by Jesús Goytortua. In light of the difference, Mexican cinema typically refers to the 1947 film by its alternative title Los Cristeros and the 1972 film by the proper title of Sucedió en Jalisco.
