= Como yo te quería =

- Starring: Sara García
- Release date: 1945
- Country: Mexico
- Language: Spanish

Como yo te quería ("As I Loved You") is a 1945 Mexican film. It stars Sara García.
