= El secreto de la solterona =

1944 film by Miguel M. Delgado

- Directed by: Miguel M. Delgado
- Written by: Miguel M. Delgado; Francisco Reiguera; Juan Roca
- Based on: Das Geheimnis der alten Mamsell by E. Marlitt
- Produced by: Vicente Saisó Piquer
- Starring: Sara García
- Cinematography: Víctor Herrera
- Edited by: Alfredo Rosas Priego
- Release date: May 10, 1945
- Running time: 105 minutes
- Country: Mexico
- Language: Spanish

El secreto de la solterona (also known as The Secret of the Spinster or The Secret of the Old Maid) is a 1945 Mexican mystery romantic drama film directed and co-written by Miguel M. Delgado, based on an 1868 book of the same name by E. Marlitt.

== Cast ==
- Sara García as Marta
- Isabela Corona as Micaela
- José Cibrián as Pedro
- Rosario Granados as Felicidad
- Nelly Montiel as Celia
- Paco Fuentes as Juan
- Tony Díaz as Luis
- Agustín Sen as Butler Enrique
- Conchita Gentil Arcos as Federica
- Edmundo Espino as Notary
- Manuel Noriega Ruiz as Teacher
- Alicia Rodríguez as Felicidad (young)
- Gloria Rodríguez as Celia (young)
