= Bulls, Love and Glory =

- Directed by: Raúl de Anda
- Starring: Sara García
- Cinematography: Thadeus Brooks
- Edited by: Carlos Savage
- Release date: 1944
- Country: Mexico
- Language: Spanish

Bulls, Love and Glory (Spanish: "Toros, amor y gloria") is a 1944 Mexican film directed by Raúl de Anda. It stars Sara García.
