= La señora de enfrente =

- Starring: Sara García
- Release date: 1945
- Country: Mexico
- Language: Spanish

La señora de enfrente ("The Lady in Front") is a 1945 Mexican film. It stars Sara García.

== Cast ==
- Sara García as Lastenia Cortazano
- Carmen Montejo as Gilberta Madrigal
- Rafael Baledón as Antonio R. Olmedo
- José Pidal as Señor Rodríguez
- Emma Roldán as Martina
- Arturo Soto Rangel as Padre Juan
- José Morcillo as Judge
- Natalia Ortiz as Señora Martínez
- Magdalena Labastida as María
- Consuelo Segarra as Efigenia
- Rosa Castro as Nena
- Lupe del Castillo as Nena's mother
