= Padre de más de cuatro =

1938 film

- Starring: Sara García
- Release date: 1938
- Country: Mexico
- Language: Spanish

Padre de más de cuatro ("Father of More Than Four") is a 1938 Mexican film. It stars Sara García.
