= Tuya en cuerpo y alma =

- Starring: Sara García
- Release date: 1945
- Country: Mexico
- Language: Spanish

Tuya en cuerpo y alma ("Yours in Body and Soul") is a 1945 Mexican film. It stars Sara García.
