= My Children =

- Starring: Sara García
- Release date: 1944
- Country: Mexico
- Language: Spanish

My Children (Spanish: Mis hijos) is a 1944 Mexican film directed by René Cardona. It stars Sara García.
