= La trepadora =

- Directed by: Gilberto Martínez Solares
- Written by: Rómulo Gallegos (novel)
- Starring: Sara García
- Release date: 1944
- Country: Mexico
- Language: Spanish

La trepadora ("The Climber") is a 1944 Mexican film. It stars Sara García.
