= Eterna agonía =

- Directed by: Julián Soler
- Produced by: Alfonso Rosas Priego
- Starring: Sara García
- Cinematography: José Ortiz Ramos
- Edited by: Alfredo Rosas Priego
- Release date: 1949
- Country: Mexico
- Language: Spanish

Eterna agonía ("Eternal Agony") is a 1949 Mexican film. It stars Sara García.
