= Lady Windermere's Fan (mathematics) =

In mathematics, Lady Windermere's Fan is a telescopic identity employed to relate global and local error of a numerical algorithm. The name is derived from Oscar Wilde's 1892 play Lady Windermere's Fan, A Play About a Good Woman.

== Lady Windermere's Fan for a function of one variable ==
Let $E(\ \tau,t_0,y(t_0)\ )$ be the exact solution operator so that:

$$y(t_0+\tau) = E(\tau,t_0,y(t_0))\ y(t_0)$$

with $t_0$ denoting the initial time and $y(t)$ the function to be approximated with a given $y(t_0)$.

Further let $y_n$, $n \in \N,\ n\le N$ be the numerical approximation at time $t_n$, $t_0 < t_n \le T = t_N$. $y_n$ can be attained by means of the approximation operator $\Phi(\ h_n,t_n,y(t_n)\ )$ so that:

$y_n = \Phi(\ h_{n-1},t_{n-1},y(t_{n-1})\ )\ y_{n-1}\quad$ with $h_n = t_{n+1} - t_n$

The approximation operator represents the numerical scheme used. For a simple explicit forward Euler method with step width $h$ this would be: $\Phi_{\text{Euler}}(\ h,t_{n-1},y(t_{n-1})\ )\ y_{n-1} = (1 + h \frac{d}{dt})\ y_{n-1}$

The local error $d_n$ is then given by:

$$d_n:= D(\ h_{n-1},t_{n-1},y(t_{n-1})\ )\ y_{n-1} := \left[ \Phi(\ h_{n-1},t_{n-1},y(t_{n-1})\ ) - E(\ h_{n-1},t_{n-1},y(t_{n-1})\ ) \right]\ y_{n-1}$$

In abbreviation we write:

$$\Phi(h_n) := \Phi(\ h_n,t_n,y(t_n)\ )$$
$$E(h_n) := E(\ h_n,t_n,y(t_n)\ )$$
$$D(h_n) := D(\ h_n,t_n,y(t_n)\ )$$

Then Lady Windermere's Fan for a function of a single variable $t$ writes as:

$y_N-y(t_N) = \prod_{j=0}^{N-1}\Phi(h_j)\ (y_0-y(t_0)) + \sum_{n=1}^N\ \prod_{j=n}^{N-1} \Phi(h_j)\ d_n$

with a global error of $y_N-y(t_N)$

=== Explanation ===
$$\begin{align}
y_N - y(t_N) &{}=
y_N - \underbrace{\prod_{j=0}^{N-1} \Phi(h_j)\ y(t_0) + \prod_{j=0}^{N-1} \Phi(h_j)\ y(t_0)}_{=0} - y(t_N) \\
&{}= y_N - \prod_{j=0}^{N-1} \Phi(h_j)\ y(t_0) + \underbrace{\sum_{n=0}^{N-1}\ \prod_{j=n}^{N-1} \Phi(h_j)\ y(t_n) - \sum_{n=1}^N\ \prod_{j=n}^{N-1} \Phi(h_j)\ y(t_n)}_{=\prod_{j=0}^{N-1} \Phi(h_j)\ y(t_0)-\sum_{n=N}^{N}\left[\prod_{j=n}^{N-1} \Phi(h_j)\right]\ y(t_n) = \prod_{j=0}^{N-1} \Phi(h_j)\ y(t_0) - y(t_N) } \\
&{}= \prod_{j=0}^{N-1}\Phi(h_j)\ y_0 - \prod_{j=0}^{N-1}\Phi(h_j)\ y(t_0) + \sum_{n=1}^N\ \prod_{j=n-1}^{N-1} \Phi(h_j)\ y(t_{n-1}) - \sum_{n=1}^N\ \prod_{j=n}^{N-1} \Phi(h_j)\ y(t_n) \\
&{}= \prod_{j=0}^{N-1}\Phi(h_j)\ (y_0-y(t_0)) + \sum_{n=1}^N\ \prod_{j=n}^{N-1} \Phi(h_j) \left[ \Phi(h_{n-1}) - E(h_{n-1}) \right] \ y(t_{n-1}) \\
&{}= \prod_{j=0}^{N-1}\Phi(h_j)\ (y_0-y(t_0)) + \sum_{n=1}^N\ \prod_{j=n}^{N-1} \Phi(h_j)\ d_n
\end{align}$$

== See also ==
- Baker–Campbell–Hausdorff formula
- Numerical error
