= La abuelita =

1942 film

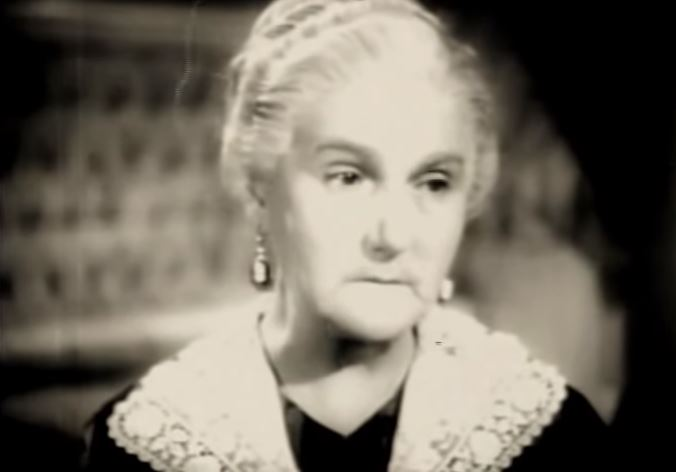
- Sara García in the film
- Directed by: Raphael J. Sevilla
- Written by: Carlos Martínez Baena; Raphael J. Sevilla
- Starring: Sara García; Pituka de Foronda
- Release date: 9 May 1942
- Running time: 94 minutes
- Country: Mexico
- Language: Spanish

La abuelita ("The Granny") is a 1942 Mexican film. It stars Sara García and Pituka de Foronda.

== Cast ==
- Sara García - Doña Carmen
- Pituka de Foronda - Anita
- David Silva - Fernando
- Carlos Martínez Baena - Don Jesusito
- Miguel Ángel Ferriz - Don Adrián
- Lucy Delgado - María
- Dolores Camarillo - Josefa, sirvienta
