= El jagüey de las ruinas =

- Directed by: Gilberto Martínez Solares
- Written by: Gilberto Martínez Solares
- Starring: Sara García
- Edited by: Jorge Busto
- Release date: 1945
- Country: Mexico
- Language: Spanish

El jagüey de las ruinas ("The Pool of the Ruins") is a 1945 Mexican film. It stars Sara García.
