= Caminito alegre =

- Directed by: Miguel Morayta
- Starring: Sara García; Isabela Corona
- Release date: 17 February 1944 (Mexico)
- Country: Mexico
- Language: Spanish

Caminito alegre (English: Cheerful Little Pathway) is a 1944 Mexican comedy drama film directed by Miguel Morayta and starring Sara García and Isabela Corona. The film's art director was Manuel Fontanals.

== Cast ==
- Sara García as Antonia Goyena
- Isabela Corona as Madre superiora
- Ángel Garasa as Don Maximiliano
- Carmen Montejo as Hermana Isabel
- Eduardo Arozamena as Don José Limón
- Luis G. Barreiro as Cayetano
- Arturo Soto Rangel as Don Gastón
- Lucy Delgado as Hermana Isaura
- Alejandro Ciangherotti as Luis
- Manuel Noriega Ruiz as Don Julián
- Pepe Martínez as Don Zacarias
- Manuel Dondé as Señor (uncredited)

== Bibliography ==
- Peralta Gilabert, Rosa. Manuel Fontanals, escenógrafo: teatro, cine y exilio. Editorial Fundamentos, 2007.
- Yankelevich, Pablo. México, país refugio: la experiencia de los exilios en el siglo XX. Plaza y Valdes, 2002.
