= La inocente =

- Release date: 1972
- Running time: 91 minute
- Country: Mexico
- Language: Spanish

La inocente ("The Innocent") is a 1972 Mexican film starring Meche Carreño as Constancia, a woman who suffers from infantilism.

== Cast ==
- Meche Carreño as Constancia
- Lilia Michel as Alicia
- Sara García as the grandma
- Lorena Velázquez as Juan's stepmother
- Rogelio A. Gonzalez III as Juan
- Alicia Montoya as Petra
- Bruno Rey as Juan's father
- Guillermo Argüelles
- Ma. Cecilia Leger as woman at the park
- Martha Beatriz Carrillo
- Bertha Llergo
- Enriqueta Carrasco as child mother
- Nicolás Jasso
- Fernando Naranjo
- Enrique Fernández
- Eduardo MacGregor as Doctor Mendoza
