= Juan José Ortega =

Mexican film director (1904–1996)

- Born: October 27, 1904; Matehuala, San Luis Potosí, Mexico
- Died: December 27, 1996 (aged 92); Mexico
- Occupation(s): Film director, producer, screenwriter
- Years active: 1942-1990

Juan José Ortega (October 27, 1904 – December 27, 1996) was a Mexican film director, producer and screenwriter. He was active during the Golden Age of Mexican cinema, and directed over 40 films between 1942 and 1966.

== Filmography ==
=== Director ===
- Flor de fango (1942)
- Lo que sólo el hombre puede sufrir (1943)
- La razón de la culpa (1943)
- La hija del cielo (1943)
- El rosario (1944)
- El abanico de Lady Windermere (1944)
- Toda una vida (1945)
- Sendas del destino (1945)
- La mujer legítima (1945)
- La casa de la zorra (1945)
- Amar es vivir (1946)
- La insaciable (1947)
- The Fallen Angel (1949)
- Zorina (1949)
- Cuando el alba llegue (1950)
- Ritmos del Caribe (1950)
- Lodo y armiño (1951)
- The Lie (1952)
- Piel canela (1953)
- Yo no creo en los hombres (1954)
- Me gustan todas (1954)
- Frente al pecado de ayer (1955)
- Corazón salvaje (1956)
- No me olvides nunca (1956)
- Una lección de amor (1956)
- Tropicana (1957)
- Cuentan de una mujer (1959)
- His First Love (1960)
- En carne propia (1961)
- Ay Chabela...! (1961)
- La moneda rota (1962)
- 'Monte Escondido' o (Leonardo Moncada) (1962)
- Pueblo de odios (1962)
- Horizontes de sangre (1962)
- Entre bala y bala (1963)
- Herencia maldita (1963)
- Las bravuconas (1963)
- El río de las ánimas (1964)
- Frente al destino (1964)
- Los murciélagos (1964)
- Preciosa (1965)
- Pacto de sangre (1966)
