= Lady Windermere's Fan (1944 film) =

1944 film by Juan José Ortega

- Directed by: Juan José Ortega
- Written by: Luis G. Basurto
- Based on: Lady Windermere's Fan by Oscar Wilde
- Produced by: Juan José Ortega
- Starring: Susana Guízar; Anita Blanch; René Cardona
- Cinematography: Ezequiel Carrasco
- Edited by: Juan José Marino
- Music by: Manuel Esperón; Rosalío Ramírez
- Release date: 25 August 1944
- Running time: 89 minutes
- Country: Mexico
- Language: Spanish

Lady Windermere's Fan (Spanish: El abanico de Lady Windermere) is a 1944 Mexican drama film directed by Juan José Ortega and starring Susana Guízar, Anita Blanch and René Cardona. The film's sets were designed by the art director Ramón Rodríguez Granada. It is based on the 1892 play Lady Windermere's Fan by Oscar Wilde.

== Plot ==
Lady Windermere discovers that her husband may have a mistress. When confronted, he dismisses the accusations and invites his supposed lover, Mrs. Erlyne, to Windermere's birthday dance. Lady Windermere, upset by her husband's suspected infidelity, runs away with Lord Darlington after he professes his love for her.

== Cast ==
- Susana Guízar as Lady Margarita Windermere
- Anita Blanch as Mrs. Erlynne / Condesa Margarita
- René Cardona as Lord Arturo Windermere
- Augusto Novaro as Lord Darlington
- Miguel Ángel Ferriz as Don Jorge Douglas
- Fanny Schiller as Duquesa
- Arturo Soto Rangel as Parker
- Emilia Guiú as Elena
- Alfonso Ruiz Gómez as Cecilio
- Mercedes Ferriz as Isabel
- Diana Bordes as Agata
- Ángel Di Stefani as Mr. Dumby
- Emma Fink as Hermana Saville
- Aurora Zermeño as Lady Laura Stutfield
- Raúl Lechuga as Gerardo
- Héctor López Portillo as Roberto
- Dolores Tinoco as Nana Saville
- Enrique García Álvarez as Mr. Hopper
- Roberto Cañedo as Amante de Mrs. Erlynne
- Roberto Corell as Francois

== Bibliography ==
- Cahir, Linda Costanzo. Literature into Film: Theory and Practical Approaches. McFarland, 2006.
- Goble, Alan. The Complete Index to Literary Sources in Film. Walter de Gruyter, 1999.
