= La corte de faraón =

1944 Mexican musical comedy film

La corte de faraón is a 1944 Mexican musical comedy film directed and co-written by Julio Bracho. It stars Mapy Cortés, Roberto Soto, and Fernando Cortés.

== Cast ==
- Mapy Cortés as Lota
- Roberto Soto as Faraón
- Fernando Cortés as Putifar
- Consuelo Guerrero de Luna as Faraona (as Consuelo G. de Luna)
- Alfredo Varela as Casto José (as Alfredo Varela Jr.)
- Ernesto Alonso as Micerino
- Lucila Bowling as Secretaria de Raquel (as Lucille Bowling)
- Fanny Schiller as Viuda
- Eugenia Galindo as Viuda
- Carmen Delgado as Viuda
- Octavio Martínez
- Manuel Noriega
- Manuel Dondé
- Jesús Valero
- Humberto Rodríguez
- Pedro Elviro (as Pitouto)
- Paco Martínez (as Francisco Martínez)
- Julio Daneri
- Alfredo de Soto
- José Ruvalcaba (as José Rubalcava)
- Maruja Grifell (as María Griffel)
- Alfredo Varela padre (as Alfredo Varela Sr.)
- F. Meléndez del Valle
- Ari Ana
