= Club verde =

1945 film by Raphael J. Sevilla

Club verde is a 1945 Mexican musical drama film directed by Raphael J. Sevilla. It stars Emilio Tuero, Emilia Guiú, and Celia Montalván.
