= My Lupe and My Horse =

1944 film

My Lupe and My Horse (Spanish: Mi lupe y mi caballo) is a 1944 Mexican western comedy film directed by Carlos Toussaint. María Luisa Zea, Julio Villarreal and Fernando Fernández star in this of the "ranchera" genre.
