= Historia de un gran amor =

- Starring: Sara García
- Release date: 1942
- Country: Mexico
- Language: Spanish

Historia de un gran amor ("A Great Love Story") is a 1942 Mexican drama romance film. It is directed by Julio Bracho and stars Sara García. It is based on a novel by Pedro Antonio de Alarcón.
