= Lo que va de ayer a hoy =

1945 film by Juan Bustillo Oro and Paulino Masip

Lo que va de ayer a hoy is a 1945 Mexican fantasy comedy film directed by Juan Bustillo Oro and Paulino Masip. It stars Enrique Herrera, Rosario Granados and Miguel Arenas.
