= Escándalo de estrellas =

- Directed by: Ismael Rodríguez
- Written by: Ramiro Gómez Kemp; Arturo Manrique; José Peña; Ismael Rodríguez
- Produced by: Ramón Peón
- Starring: Pedro Infante; Blanquita Amaro; Florencio Castelló
- Cinematography: Ross Fisher
- Edited by: Fernando Martínez
- Music by: Manuel Esperón
- Distributed by: Producciones Rodríguez Hermanos
- Release date: 1 December 1944 (Mexico)
- Country: Mexico
- Language: Spanish

Escándalo de estrellas is a 1944 Mexican musical comedy film directed and co-written by Ismael Rodríguez, and starring Pedro Infante, Blanquita Amaro, and Florencio Castelló.
