= El malvado Carabel (1962 film) =

- Starring: Sara García
- Release date: 1962
- Running time: 108 minute
- Country: Mexico
- Language: Spanish

El malvado Carabel ("The Evil Carabel") is a 1962 Mexican film. It stars Sara García.
