= The Abandoned (1945 film) =

- Theatrical release poster
- Directed by: Emilio Fernández
- Written by: Emilio Fernández; Mauricio Magdaleno
- Produced by: Felipe Subervielle
- Starring: Dolores del Río; Pedro Armendáriz; Víctor Junco; Paco Fuentes; Fanny Schiller; Maruja Grifell
- Cinematography: Gabriel Figueroa
- Edited by: Gloria Schoemann
- Music by: Manuel Esperón
- Distributed by: Films Mundiales
- Release date: 1945
- Running time: 103 minutes
- Country: Mexico
- Language: Spanish

The Abandoned (Spanish: Las Abandonadas) is a 1945 Mexican film, directed and co-written by Emilio Fernández, starring Dolores del Río and Pedro Armendáriz.

== Plot ==
Margarita (Dolores del Río) is a young woman abandoned by her fiancé. She is forced to perform various jobs to raise her son, in a tumultuous 1920s Mexico.

== Production ==
Since its inception, the film was considered a rough project. Emilio Fernández's uncertain relationship with the movie studio Films Mundiales had become somewhat overconfident, judging by his increasingly frequent involvement in drafting the scripts of his films.

While Fernandez mixed stories that he had seen on the screen with events of the Mexican Revolution, producer Agustrín J. Fink became ill. A cloud of pessimism clouded preparations for the shooting, as the budget went over one million pesos, much of it invested in very expensive clothes that a Hollywood designer drew up for the showcasing of Dolores del Río. Efforts to save Fink's life were useless, and the producer died three weeks before the shooting began.

In November 1944, The Abandoned was ready for release when the ban came exhibition. The then head of the Film Censor Department, under the Ministry of the Interior of Mexico, said he had suggested to Fernandez and Films Mundiales put a caption indicating that the plot was happening "In the turbulent Mexico of 1914." The incident was resolved through the intervention of journalists and film critics, who noted the incongruity of prohibiting the showing of a film whose script had been reviewed and authorized by the same censorious authorities. Finally, in March 1945-and favored by the scandal The Abandoned was released to great acclaim.

This film ranks 93 in the list of the 100 best films of Mexican cinema, in the opinion of 25 film critics and specialists in Mexico.
