= Peach Blossom (film) =

- Flor de durazno
- Directed by: Miguel Zacarías
- Based on: Flor de durazno by Hugo Wast
- Starring: Fernando Soler; Esther Fernández; David Silva
- Release date: 1945
- Country: Mexico
- Language: Spanish

Flor de durazno is a 1945 Mexican romantic drama film directed by Miguel Zacarías, who also adapted it from the novel by Gustavo Martínez Zuviria, better known for his pen name, Hugo Wast. It stars Fernando Soler, Esther Fernández, and David Silva.
