= Raphael J. Sevilla =

Mexican film director

- Born: 3 September 1905; Mexico City, Mexico
- Died: 2 January 1975 (aged 69); Mexico City, Mexico
- Occupations: Director, Producer, Writer
- Years active: 1931 - 1968 (film)

Raphael J. Sevilla (1905–1975) was a Mexican film director, producer and screenwriter.

== Selected filmography ==
=== Director ===
- Stronger Than Duty (1931)
- The Call of the Blood (1934) (co-director)
- Juarez and Maximillian (1934) (co-director)
- The Woman of the Port (1934)
- María Elena (1936)
- The Midnight Ghost (1940)
- La abuelita (1942)
- Porfirio Díaz (1944)
- Club verde (1946)
- Murder in the Studios (1946)
- The Lottery Ticket Seller (1953)
- La Calle de los amores (1954)

== Bibliography ==
- Mora, Carl J. Mexican Cinema: Reflections of a Society. University of California Press, 1989.
