= Amores de ayer =

1944 film by Ismael Rodríguez

Amores de ayer is a 1944 Mexican musical comedy drama film directed by Ismael Rodríguez. It stars Tito Guízar, Manolita Saval, and Fernando Cortés.
