= Sara García =

Mexican actress (1892–1980)

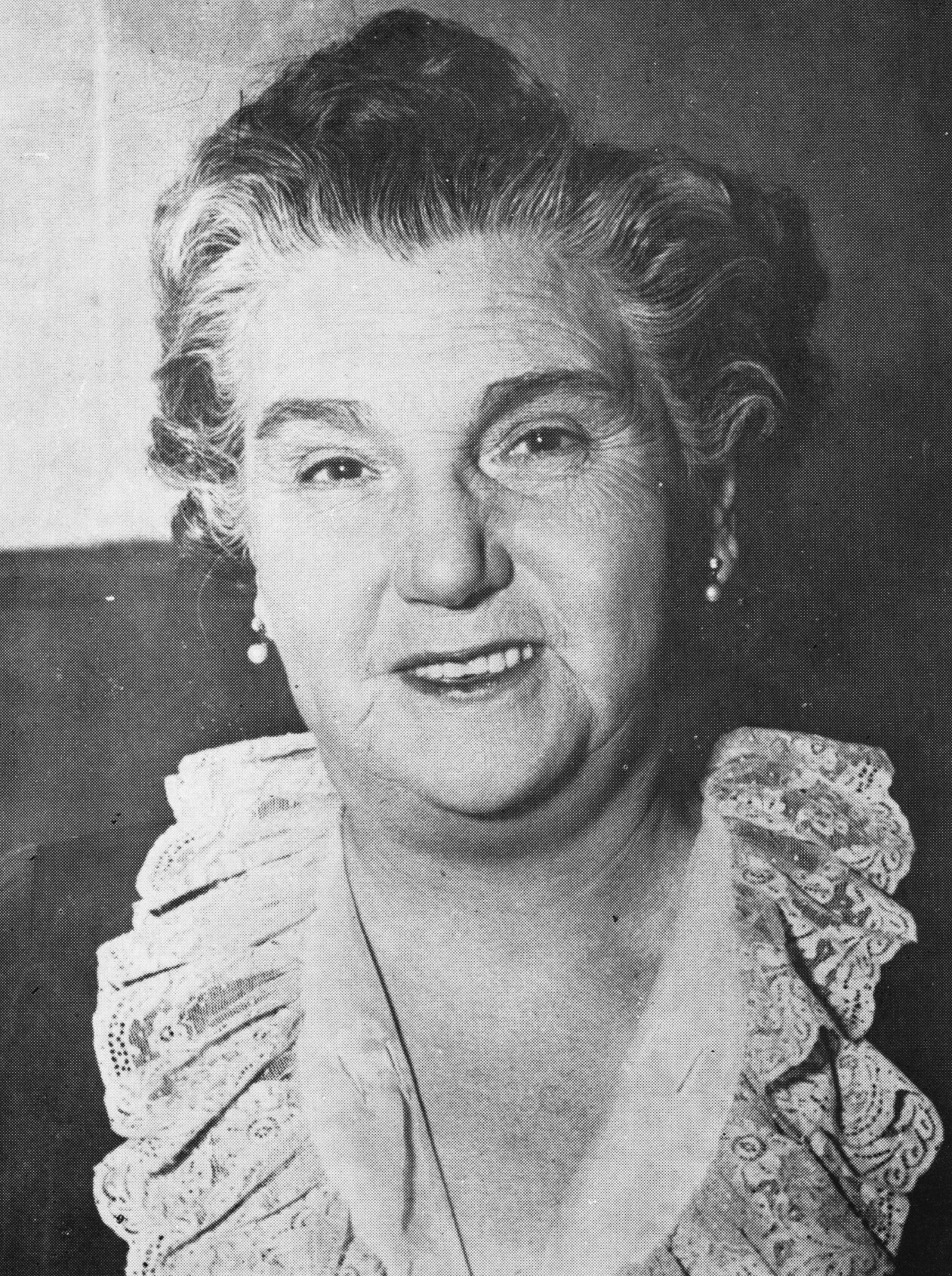
- García in 1954
- Born: Sara Rita de la Luz García; 3 September 1892; Orizaba, Veracruz, Mexico
- Died: 21 November 1980 (aged 88); Mexico City, Mexico
- Resting place: Panteón Español; Mexico City
- Other name: La Abuelita de México
- Occupation: Actress
- Years active: 1917–1980
- Spouse: Fernando Ibáñez Carranza (m. 1918; died 1932)
- Partner: Rosario González Cuenca (c. 1922-1980)
- Children: María Fernanda Ibáñez

Sara Rita de la Luz García (3 September 1892 – 21 November 1980) was a Mexican actress and comedian who made her biggest mark during the "Golden Age of Mexican cinema". During the 1940s and 1950s, she often played the part of a no-nonsense but lovable grandmother in numerous Mexican films. In later years, she played parts in Mexican telenovelas.

García is remembered by her nickname, La Abuelita de México ("Mexico's Grandmother").

== Life and career ==
=== 1892–1917: Childhood ===
Sara Rita de la Luz García was born on 3 September 1892 at Orizaba Veracruz. Her parents were Spaniards from the Andalusia region in Spain, Isidoro García Ruiz, an architect, and his wife Felipa Hidalgo de Ruiz. In the early 1900s, she contracted murine typhus and infected her mother, who died months later.

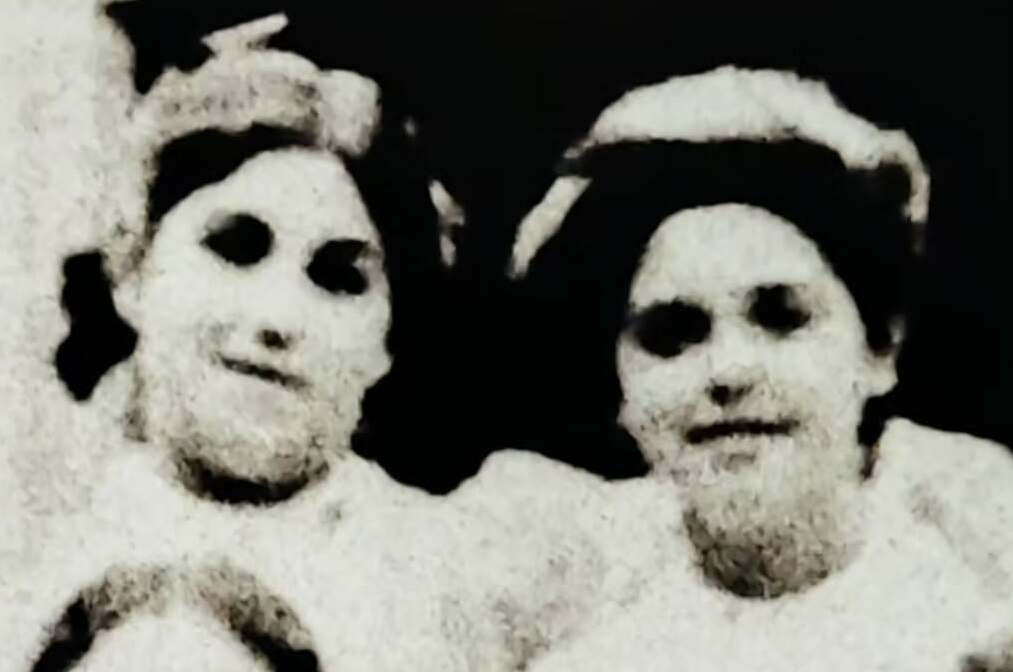
Sara García and Rosario González Cuenca in 1903, during their time at Colegio de las Vizcaínas

At the age of nine, she and her father moved back to Mexico City, where through a scholarship called "lugar de gracia" (Spanish for, "place of grace"), she was accepted into the Colegio de las Vizcaínas to pursue her academic studies. Shortly after her arrival to the city, her father suffered a stroke and was admitted into the "Casa de Beneficencia Española" (Spanish for, "Spanish Benevolent House") where he died on an unknown date. Orphaned, she remained as a boarder at the school until she came of age, being "adopted" by the nuns of the institution, which was founded on the principles of the Catholic Church. There she met Rosario González Cuenca, a girl with whom she formed a strong emotional bond. Upon graduating from that school, where she spent some time teaching as a drawing teacher, she decided to pursue a career as an actress in 1916, after watching the filming of a movie at the Azteca Films studios, which she discovered while walking through the Alameda Central.

=== 1917: Film debut in silent films ===
Sara started her film career at age 25, participating as an extra in what would be her first film, En defensa Propia (1917). After that she began auditioning in the theater where she started getting small roles. Her diction and voice gave her prestige and she became part of the most outstanding companies of that time: Mercedes Navarro, Prudencia Grifell and the sisters Anita and Isabelita Blanch. In one of her tours throughout the Mexican Republic, she met Fernando Ibáñez Carranza, whom she had seen during the filming of "La soñadora" (1917).

=== 1918–1947: Golden Age of Mexican cinema and La Abuelita de México ===
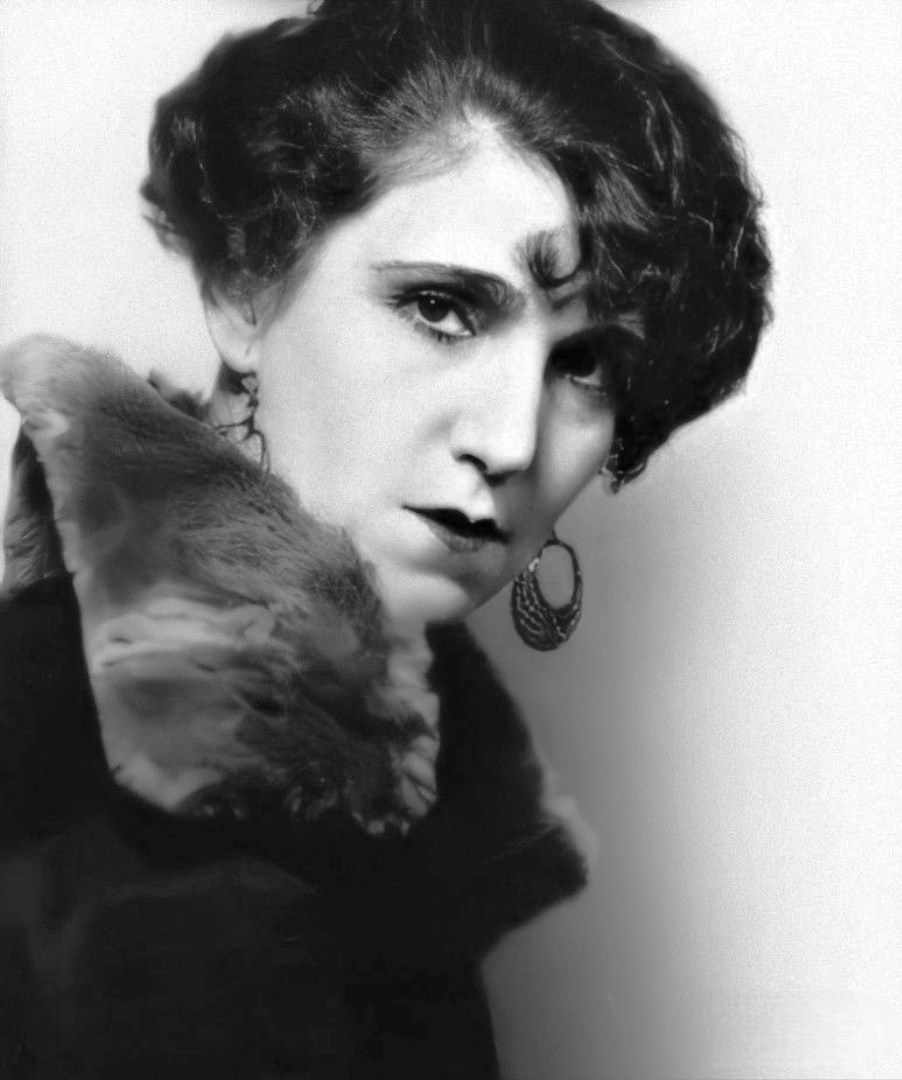
Sara García in 1918

In 1918, she married Fernando Ibáñez. They toured throughout Mexico and Central America, until at a stop in Tepic, she gave birth to a girl, whom they named Fernanda Mercedes Ibáñez García. Sara decided to take care of her daughter, and stopped touring. Her absence bothered Fernando, who began to get involved in several affairs, then became entangled with the head of the company. Sara divorced her husband and left with her daughter. At that point, Rosario, who had divorced her husband, met her again when she attended to her at the corset shop "La Europea" on República de Uruguay street, where she worked. Upon learning of her situation, she offered her help in caring for her daughter in a kind of shared parenting, and also offered her a place to live in her small house located on Mesones Street in the Historic Center of Mexico City, where she lived with her mother, her sister Blanca, and her brother-in-law. In this way, Sara became part of the González Cuenca family. Years later her ex-husband became sick, and returned home. Sara cared for him, even paying his expenses, until his death in 1932. Established firmly in the theater, she began to be called to work in the cinema.

Her daughter Fernanda also ventured into the cinema with the movie "La madrina del diablo" (1937) in which she played Jorge Negrete's girlfriend. On 18 October 1940, María Fernanda Ibáñez died at the age of 20 from an internal hemorrhage, in which her first grandchild, who she was expecting with her husband, also died.

Film actress Emma Roldán suggested Sara García for the role of Doña Panchita, an old woman, in the 1940 film Allá en el trópico ("There in the Tropics"). The film's director Fernando de Fuentes considered García too young for the part (indeed she was only in her mid 40s) but Roldán replied, saying "Sara is an actress, and actresses don't have an age". For the screen test, Sara García had a wig made for her. At the time of the screen test, the director asked the crew of her whereabouts and when they answered that she was the woman in front of him, the director was shocked: Her wig, lack of teeth, and performance had touched him. It is in Fernando de Fuentes' Allá en el trópico where Sara García won her title of la Abuelita de México (Mexico's Grandmother).

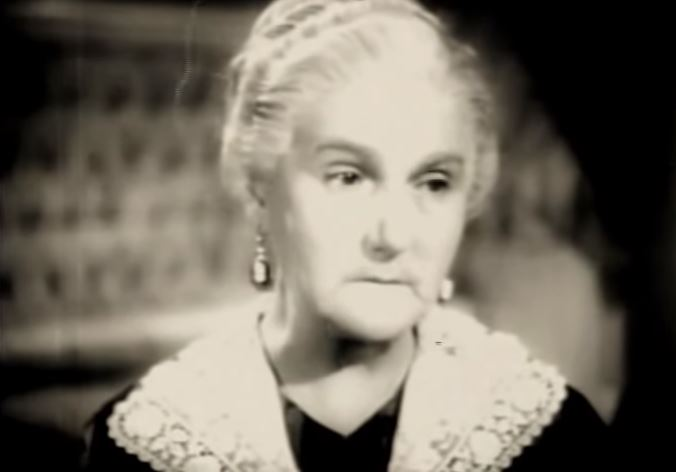
García in La abuelita (1942)

In 1942, Sara García co-starred with Joaquín Pardavé in El baisano Jalil, a comedy film in which she portrayed the wife of a Lebanese-immigrant family, one of the marginalized communities that settled in the La Lagunilla neighborhood of Mexico City. She starred again with Pardavé in a similar comedy, El barchante Neguib (1945).

She then started a long series of films, co-starring with the brightest stars of the Mexican cinema, such as Cantinflas, Jorge Negrete, and Germán Valdés "Tin-Tan".

She often starred as the grandmother of famous Mexican actor Pedro Infante. Her most remembered film with him is the 1947 Los tres García where she also starred alongside Abel Salazar and Víctor Manuel Mendoza, playing the role of their grandmother with a strong, naughty and authoritarian attitude.

=== 1947–1980: Multiple films, Telenovelas and final works ===
García continued working with Pardave and appeared with him in El ropavejero "The junkman" (1947) and in Azahares para tu boda "Orange blossoms for your wedding" (1950), which were her last jobs with him. Garcia's nature was also deeply irreverent, and she showed it in films like Doña Clarines (1951), in which she makes fun of her grandmother's character, something she repeated in Las señoritas Vivanco "The Misses Vivanco" (1959) and in El proceso de las señoritas Vivanco "The process of the Misses Vivanco" (1961), in both she acted with Prudencia Grifell and was directed by Mauricio de la Serna.

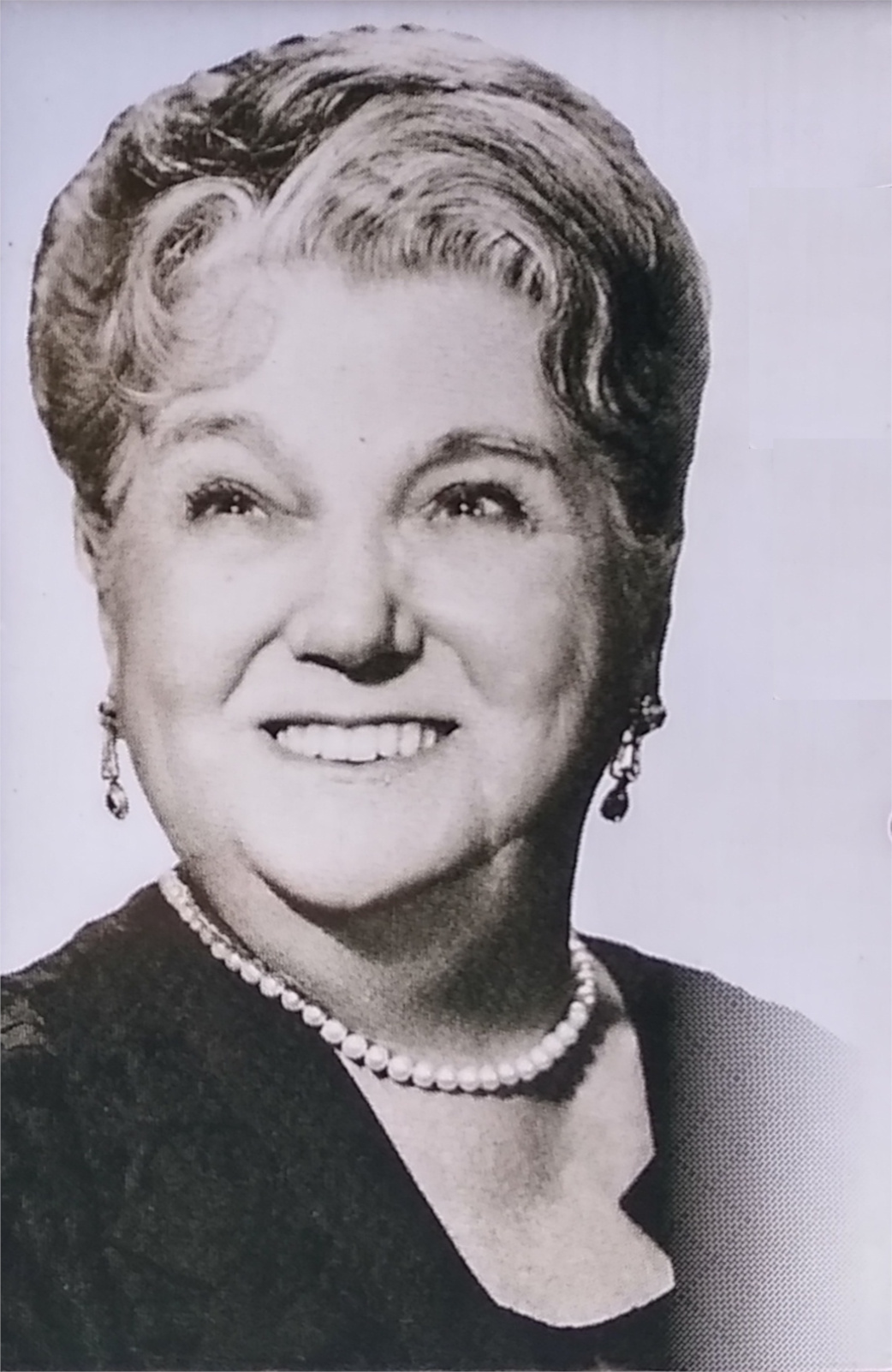
García, c. 1960s

In that decade she worked in both film and television, appearing in multiple soap operas such as "A Face in the Past" (1960), "La gloria Quedo atrás" (1962), and "La Duchess" (1966), in which a lottery ticket seller wins the jackpot and uses that money to get her daughter back, whom she had given up to her millionaire in-laws in the past.

In that decade she also appeared in the pages of a comic-book adventure story entitled "Doña Sara, la mera mera", in which she was dressed as the character she had made famous in Los tres García and Vuelven los García. In the 1970s, her grandmother character took part in films such as "Fin de fiesta" (1972), by Mauricio Walerstein, and Luis Alcoriza's "Mecánica Nacional" (1972).

In the 70s she appeared as Nana Tomasita, who looked after Cristina (Graciela Mauri) in the long-running telenovela Mundo de juguete (1974) and as a meticulous old woman from the "Caridad" segment, directed by Jorge Fons, in "Faith, Hope and Charity."

=== Later years and death ===
García had her own television show in 1951, Media hora con Abuelita, but it failed and was cancelled. She returned to television in 1960 when she obtained a role in Un rostro en el pasado which was her first of eight telenovelas. These included Mundo de juguete in 1974, which as of (early 2006) was the longest-running telenovela in history, and Viviana with Lucía Méndez in 1978.

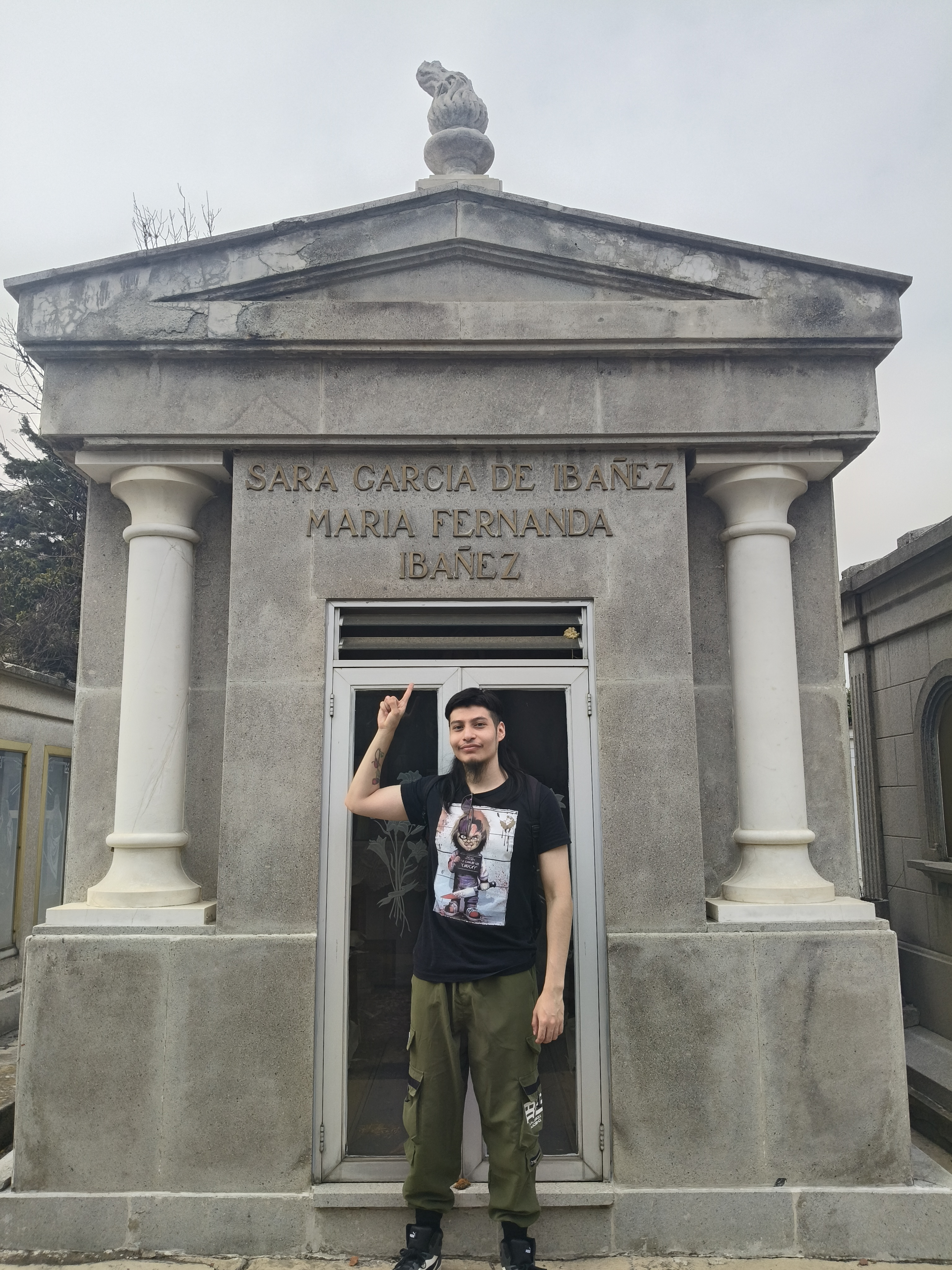
Mausoleum of Sara García and her daughter María Fernanda Ibáñez located at the Panteón Español of Mexico City, in 2025

On 21 November 1980, Sara died at the National Medical Center in Mexico City at the age of 88, due to a cardiac arrest that arose from pneumonia.

García was buried alongside her daughter in a mausoleum at the Panteón Español cemetery in Mexico City. While she was being buried, the song "Mi Cariñito" ("My Little Darling/Beloved One") was played. This song was the one that Pedro Infante sang to Sara several times. In particular, he sang it drunk and tearfully, as a lament after Sara's character died in the movie Vuelven Los Garcia (The Garcias Return). It is said that the song was sung at her funeral by Lucha Villa.

== Personal life ==
Although it was never openly confirmed by García, it is claimed that she had a longtime romantic relationship with Rosario González Cuenca. After her death, Rosario was named her universal heir, remaining in possession of all her material assets and the house in which they lived together for years, which was located at Rebsamen No. 929, in the Colonia Del Valle, Mexico City, where she resided until her death on 5 April 1983. According to studies, they were forced to hide their status as a couple due to the social stigma of their time regarding homosexuality.

== Legacy ==
In Mexico, García represented a grandmotherly figure due to her many roles as a grandmother in the movies she appeared in, and in 1973 she signed a commercial agreement to allow the chocolate company La Azteca use her image on Mexico's traditional Abuelita chocolate. La Azteca was later purchased by the Nestlé brand in 1995, who continued to use her image on the same brand.

== Filmography ==
=== Telenovelas ===
Year	Title	Role	Notes
1960	Un rostro en el pasado		3 episodes
1962	La gloria quedó atrás		3 episodes
1966	La duquesa	La duquesa (Duchess), Raquel	3 episodes
1967	Anita de Montemar		3 episodes
1968	El padre Guernica		
1968	Mi maestro		
1972	Telenovela mensual		
1973	Mi rival	Chayo	19 episodes
1974-1977	Mundo de juguete	Nana (Nanny) Tomasita	221 episodes
1978	Viviana	Doña Angustias Rubio Montesinos	3 episodes

=== Television shows ===
Year	Title	Role	Notes
1951	Media hora con la abuelita		
1957, 1959	Secreto de familia		4 episodes

=== Documentaries ===
Year	Title	Role	Notes
1940	Recordar es vivir		
1963	La vida de Pedro Infante		
1976	México de mis amores		

=== Cinema of Mexico ===
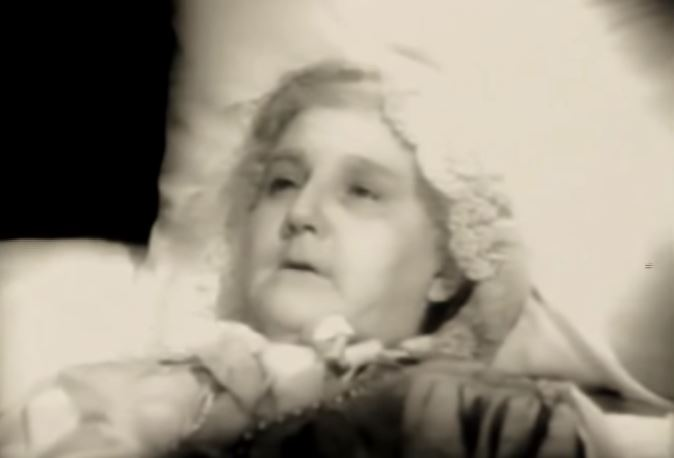

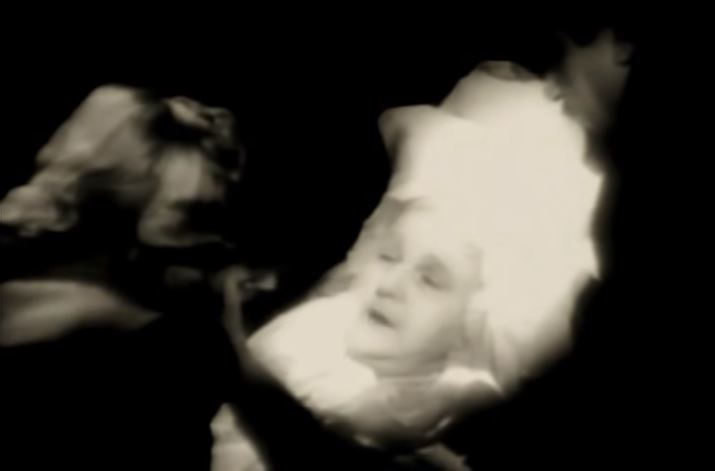
Sara García in La abuelita (1942)

Year	Title	Role	Notes
1917	En defensa Propia		Extra
1917	Alma de sacrificio		Extra
1917	La soñadora		Extra
1927	Yo soy tu padre		Extra
1934	El pulpo humano		
1934	El vuelo de la muerte	Doña Clara	
1934	La sangre manda	Vecina (Neighbor)	
1934	¡Viva México! (El grito de Dolores)	Josefa Ortiz de Domínguez	
1936	Such Is Woman (Así es la mujer)	Viuda (Widow)	
1936	Marihuana (El monstruo verde)	Petra	
1936	Malditas sean las mujeres	Señora de Ambrosaliet	
1936	No te engañes corazón	Doña Petro	
1937	Las mujeres mandan	Marta	
1937	La honradez es un estorbo	Doña Refugio	
1937	No basta ser madre	Sebastiana del Puerto	
1938	Por mis pistolas		
1938	Pescadores de perlas	Juana	
1938	Dos cadetes	Dolores	
1938	Padre de más de cuatro	Doña Gertrudis	
1938	Perjura	Doña Rosa	
1938	Su adorable majadero	Mariquita	
1939	El capitán aventurero	Catalina, corregidora	
1939	Father's Entanglements	Petra	
1939	Calumnia	Eduviges	
1939	Papacito lindo	Remedios	
1939	Three Peasants on a Donkey	Manuela	
1940	Miente y serás feliz	Constancia	
1940	Allá en el trópico	Doña Panchita	
1940	Mi madrecita	Madre	
1940	Here's the Point'	Clotilde Regalado, Leonardo del Paso's mistress	
1940	Father Gets Untangled (Papá se desenreda)	Petra	
1941	Cuando los hijos se van	Lupe de Rosales	
1941	¿Quién te quiere a ti?	Seducer's mother	
1941	La gallina clueca	Teresa de Treviño	
1941	To the Sound of the Marimba	Doña Cornelia Escobar	
1942	Las tres viudas de papá	Petra	
1942	Father Gets Entangled Again	Petra	
1942	Alejandra	Doña Elena	
1942	Dos mexicanos en Sevilla	Gracia	
1942	Regalo de Reyes	Doña Esperanza	
1942	La abuelita	Doña Carmen	
1942	Historia de un gran amor	Doña Josefa	
1942	El baisano Jalil	Suad	
1942	El verdugo de Sevilla	Doña Nieves	
1943	Resurrection (Resurrección)	Genoveva	
1943	No matarás	Aurora	
1943	Caminito alegre	Antonia Goyena	
1943	Toros, amor y gloria	Irene	
1944	Mis hijos	María	
1944	La trepadora	Doña Carmelita	
1944	El secreto de la solterona	Marta	
1944	El jagüey de las ruinas	Doña Teresa "Mamanina"	
1944	Como yo te quería	Remedios Mantilla	
1945	Escuadrón 201	Doña Herlinda	
1945	La señora de enfrente	Lastenia Cortazano	
1945	Mamá Inés	Inés Valenzuela	
1946	El barchante Neguib	Sara	
1946	¡Ay qué rechula es Puebla!	Doña Severa	
1947	Sucedió en Jalisco (Los cristeros)	Doña Engracia, abuela (Grandma)	
1947	El ropavejero	María	
1947	The Three Garcias	Doña Luisa García viuda de García	
1947	The Garcias Return	Doña Luisa García viuda de García	
1948	Los que volvieron	Marta Ortos	
1948	Mi madre adorada	Doña Lolita	
1948	Dueña y señora	Toña	
1948	Tía Candela	Candelaria López y Polvorilla "Tía Candela"	
1949	Dicen que soy mujeriego	Doña Rosa	
1949	The Perez Family (La familia Pérez)	Natalia Vivanco de Pérez	
1949	Eterna agonía	Doña Cholita	
1949	Novia a la medida	Doña Socorro	
1949	El diablo no es tan diablo	Doña Leonor	
1949	Dos pesos dejada	Prudencia	
1950	Yo quiero ser hombre	Tía Milagros / Doña Tanasia	
1950	My Favourite	Doña Sara	
1950	Si me viera don Porfirio	Doña Martirio	
1950	Orange Blossom for Your Wedding	Eloísa	
1950	Mi querido capitán	Pelancha	
1950	Yo quiero ser tonta	Atilana	
1951	La reina del mambo	Tía (Aunt)	
1951	El papelerito	Doña Dominga	
1951	Doña Clarines	Clara Urrutia 'Doña Clarines'	
1951	La duquesa del Tepetate	Chonita, Duquesa del Tepetate	
1951	Get Your Sandwiches Here	Dolores	
1952	La miel se fue de la luna	Doña Martirio	
1953	Misericordia	Benigna	
1953	Por el mismo camino	Tía Justa	
1953	El lunar de la familia	Doña Luisa Jiménez	
1953	Genio y figura	Doña Luisa	
1953	Los que no deben nacer	Clotilde	
1954	Los Fernández de Peralvillo	Doña Conchita Fernández; doña Chita	
1954	El hombre inquieto	Doña Fátima Sayeh	
1955	Sólo para maridos	Concordia	
1956	El crucifijo de piedra	Laura	
1956	La tercera palabra	Matilde	
1956	El inocente	Madre de Mané	
1957	La ciudad de los niños	Doña Juliana	
1957	Pobres millonarios	Doña Margarita del Valle	
1958	El gran premio	Soledad Fuentes Lago (Doña Cholita)	
1958	Con el dedo en el gatillo	La abuela	Episode: El anónimo
1959	Los Santos Reyes	La anciana	
1959	Las señoritas Vivanco	Hortensia Vivanco y de la Vega	
1959	Yo pecador	Nana Pachita	
1961	El proceso de las señoritas Vivanco	Doña Hortensia Vivanco y de la Vega (as Doña Sara Garcia)	
1961	¡Mis abuelitas... nomás!	Doña Casilda	
1961	El buena suerte	Doña Paz	
1961	Paloma brava	Doña Popotita	
1961	El analfabeto	Doña Epifanita	
1962	El malvado Carabel	Tía Elodia	
1962	Las hijas del Amapolo	La abuela	
1962	El caballo blanco	Doña Refugio	
1962	Ruletero a toda marcha	Doña Sarita	
1964	Las Chivas Rayadas	Doña Pancha	
1964	Los fenómenos del futbol	Doña Pancha	
1964	Nos dicen las intocables	Doña Cucaracha	
1964	Héroe a la fuerza	Doña Prudencia	
1965	Canta mi corazón	Abuela	
1965	Escuela para solteras	Doña Bernarda	
1965	Nos lleva la tristeza	Doña Marina Guerra viuda de Batalla	
1966	Los dos apóstoles	Doña Angustias	
1966	Joselito vagabundo	Doña Guadalupe	
1967	Seis Días para Morir (La Rabia)	Doña Mercedes	
1967	Un novio para dos hermanas	Seňora Cáceres	
1967	Las amiguitas de los ricos	Viejecita	
1968	Sor Ye Ye	Madre María de los Ángeles	Co-produced with Spain
1969	No se mande, profe	Doña Claudia	
1969	Flor marchita	Paula la nana	
1969	El día de las madres	Doña Carmen	
1970	¿Por qué nací mujer?	Doña Rosario	
1971	La casa del farol rojo	Doña Sara Morales viuda de Mendoza	
1970	La hermana dinamita	Madre Ana	
1972	La inocente	La abuela	
1972	Fin de fiesta	Doña Beatriz	
1972	Nadie te querrá como yo	Abuela	
1972	National Mechanics (Mecánica nacional)	Doña Lolita	
1973	Entre Monjas Anda el Diablo	Sor Lucero	
1973	Nosotros los feos	Doña Sara García viuda de García y García	
1973	Valente Quintero	Elvira Peña	
1974	Los Leones del ring	Doña Refugio	
1974	Los Leones del ring contra la Cosa Nostra	Doña Refugio	
1974	Fé, Esperanza y Caridad	Anciana	Segment: Caridad
1974	El hijo del pueblo	Vicenta Aurelia Fernandez; Chenta	
1977	Como gallos de pelea	Doña Altagracia	
1977	Nobleza ranchera	Altagracia	
1978	La comadrita	Doña Chonita	
1979	La vida difícil de una mujer fácil	Doña Amalia	
1979	Como México no hay dos		
1980	Sexo vs. sexo	Señora dueña del club de Can-Can (Lady Owner of Can-Can Club)	

=== Cinema of the United States ===
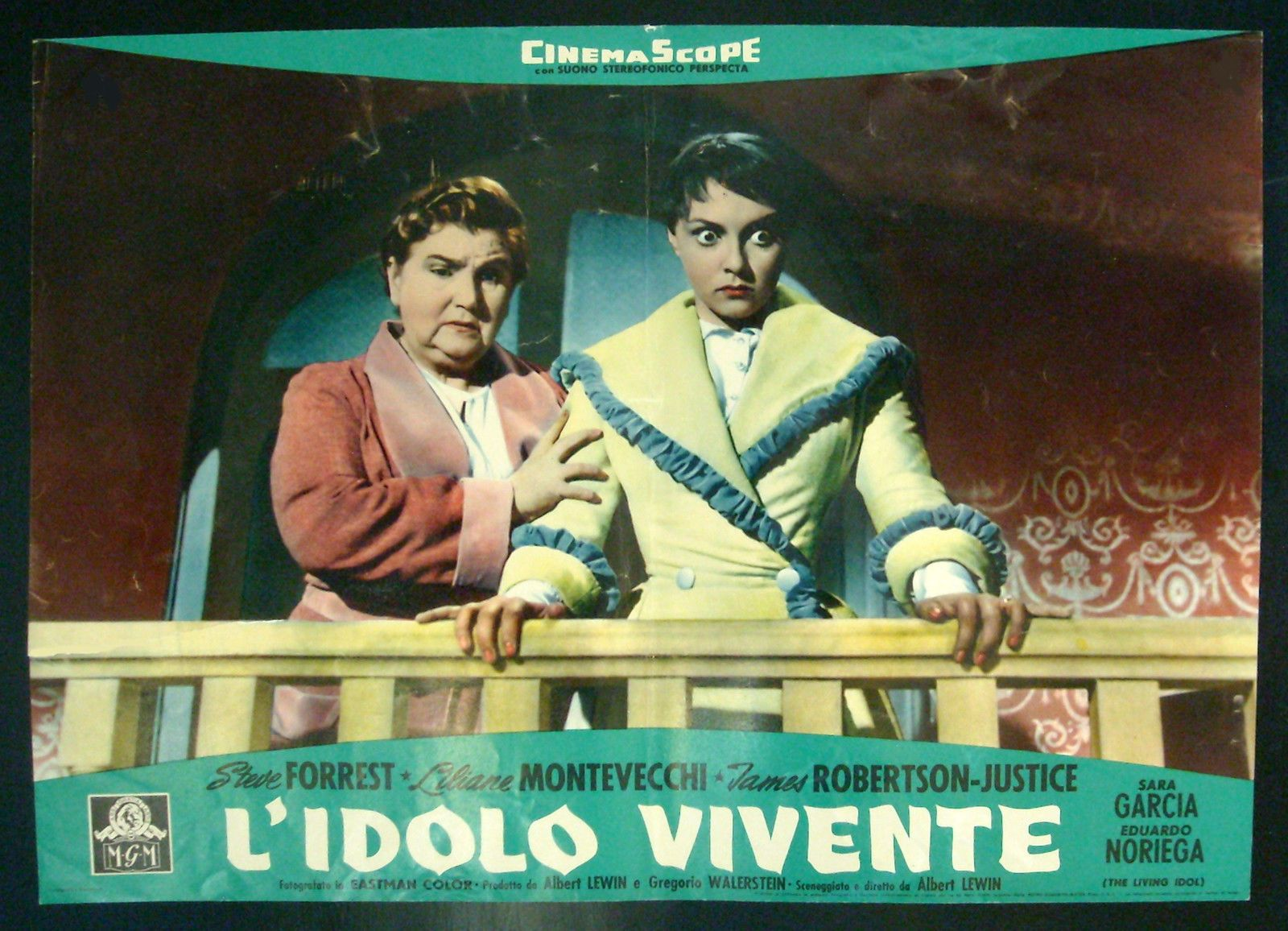
García along with Liliane Montevecchi in The Living Idol (1957)

Year	Title	Role	Notes
1957	The Living Idol (El ídolo viviente)	Elena	Co-produced with Mexico

=== Cinema of Italy ===
Year	Title	Role	Notes
1964	Los dinamiteros (L'ultimo rififi)	Doña Pura	Co-produced with Spain

=== Cinema of Spain ===
Year	Title	Role	Notes
1961	Lovely Memory	Dona Sara	
