= Bans on circus animals =

Worldwide laws on animal use in circuses: Nationwide ban / Partial or local bans (Note: Certain animals are excluded or the laws vary internally.); Ban on import/export / No ban; Unknown

Many countries (Note: Austria, Belgium, Bolivia, Bosnia and Herzegovina, Bulgaria, Colombia, Costa Rica, Croatia, Cyprus, Czech Republic, Denmark, Ecuador, El Salvador, Estonia, Finland, Greece, Hungary, India, Iran, Ireland, Israel, Italy, Malta, Mexico, the Netherlands, Norway, Panama, Paraguay, Peru, Poland, Portugal, Singapore, Slovenia, Sweden, Switzerland, and Turkey) have implemented nationwide bans on using some if not all animals in circuses. Other countries (Note: Argentina, Australia, Brazil, Canada, Chile, Germany, Spain, the United Kingdom, and the United States) have locally restricted or banned the use of animals in entertainment. In response to a growing popular concern about the use of animals in entertainment, animal-free circuses are becoming more common around the world.

Despite the contemporary circus's shift toward more theatrical techniques and its emphasis on human rather than animal performance, traditional circus companies still exist alongside the new movement. Many continue to maintain animal performers, such as the Big Apple Circus from the United States, Circus Krone from Munich, Circus Royale and Lennon Bros Circus from Australia, Vazquez Hermanos Circus, Circo Atayde Hermanos, and Hermanos Mayaror Circus from Mexico, and Moira Orfei Circus from Italy.

== Background ==
Animal lovers and rights activists around the world have often pointed their fingers at the circus regarding the cruel methods used to train and tame animals, which include blinding, removal of teeth and claws, deprivation of food and medication, forced breeding, whipping and electric shock, and their lives in undersized cages and transportation from place to place in appalling conditions. Over the past few decades many countries have issued total or partial bans on animal performances in circuses, nationwide and provincially. In 2009, Bolivia banned the use of all animals—both wild and domestic—in circus, the first nation to do so.

— P.R. Nisha, Ban and benevolence: Circus, animals and Indian state (2017)

On behalf of the Ministry of Agriculture, Nature and Food Quality of the Netherlands, Wageningen University conducted an investigation into the welfare of circus animals in 2008. The following issues, among others, were found:

- 71% of the observed animals had medical problems.
- 33% of tigers and lions did not have access to an outdoor enclosure.
- Lions spend on average 98% of their time indoors.
- An average enclosure for tigers is only 5 m^{2}.
- Elephants are shackled in chains for 17 hours a day on average.
- Elephants spend on average 10 hours a day showing stereotypic behaviour.
- Tigers are terrified of fire but are still forced to jump through fire rings.
- Since 1990 there have been over 123 cases of lion attacks at circuses.
- Animals are trained through discipline.

Based on these findings, the researchers called for more stringent regulation regarding the welfare of circus animals.

A 2009 survey confirmed that on average, wild animals spend around 99 to 91 percent of their time in cages, wagons, or enclosure due to transportation. This causes a huge amount of distress to animals and leads to excessive amounts of drooling.

On 6 June 2015, the Federation of Veterinarians of Europe adopted a position paper in which it recommends the prohibition of the use of wild animals in travelling circuses.

Animal rights groups have documented many cases of animal cruelty in the training of performing circus animals. The animal rights group People for the Ethical Treatment of Animals (PETA) contends that animals in circuses are frequently beaten into submission and that physical abuse has always been the method for training circus animals. PETA also alleges that the animals are kept in cages that are too small and are given very little opportunity to walk around outside of their enclosure, thereby violating their right to freedom. Animal trainers have argued that some criticism is not based on fact, including beliefs that shouting makes the animals believe the trainer is going to hurt them, that caging is cruel and common, and that the use of whips, chains or training harms animals.

== Asia ==
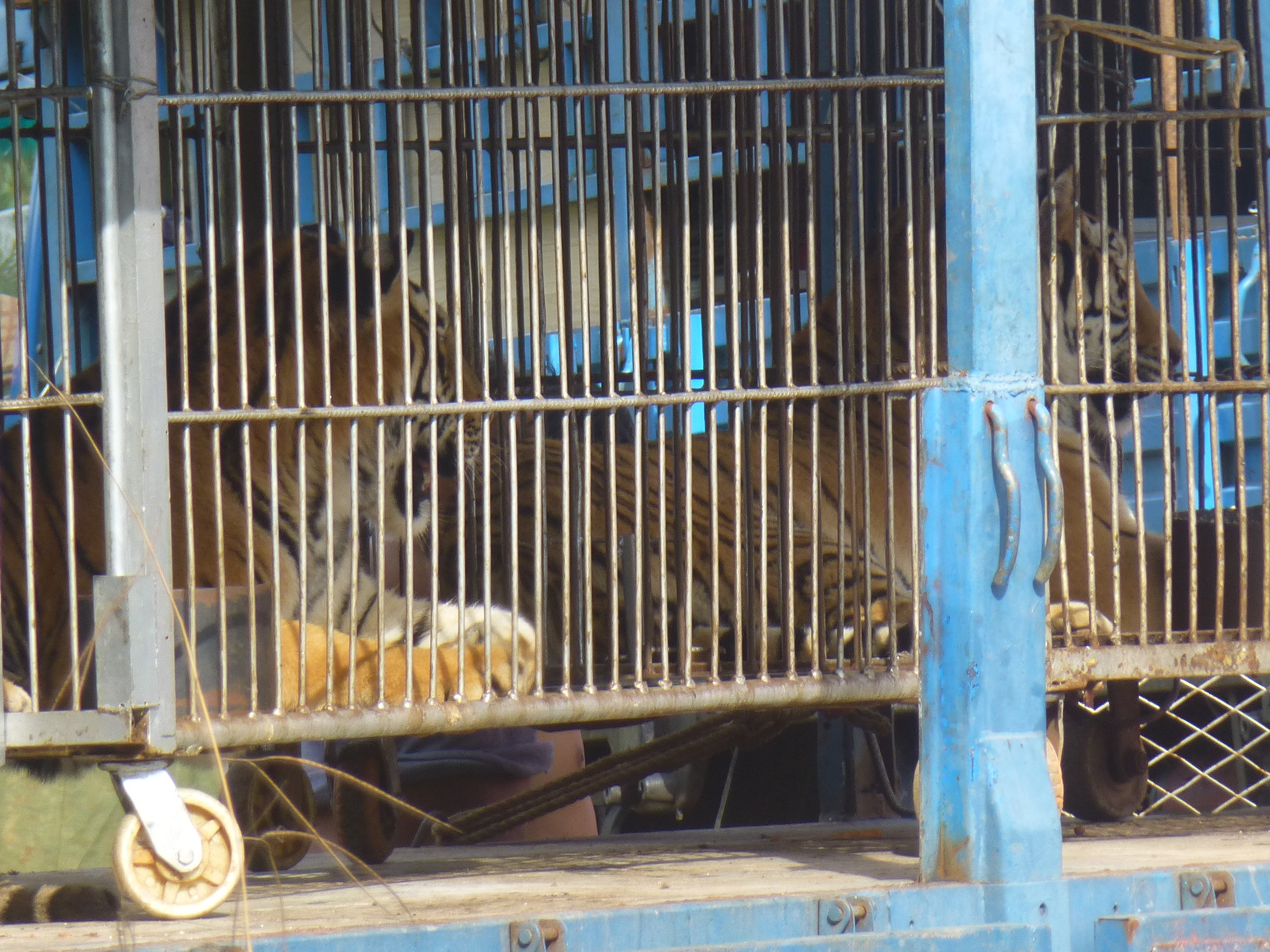
Tigers in a transport cage in a travelling circus (Guangdong, China, 2018)

=== India ===
The Prevention of Cruelty to Animals Act, 1960 is the basis of all modern animal welfare and rights in India. Section 22 of the Act prohibits the exhibition or training of any performing animal by any person, unless the person is properly registered and the Central Government has specifically excluded the animal in question from the prohibition in the The Gazette of India. This was strengthened by the Wild Life (Protection) Act, 1972, which theoretically prohibited the acquisition of wild animals for the purpose of entertainment. The Supreme Court of India confirmed in Centre for Environment Law, WWF-I v. Union of India (2013) that the 1972 Act meant that no state organisation or person can claim ownership or possession over wild animals in the forest; rather, animals in the wild are "properties of the nation", which the state is required to protect. The Performing Animals Rules, 1973 regulate the training and exhibition of performing animals in India, and required that businesses seeking to perform with animals complied to the general rules set out in the 1960 Act. In 1991, the Ministry of Environment and Forest (MoEF) issued a notification which banned the training and exhibition of "bears, monkeys, tigers, panthers and dogs" per Section 22 of the 1960 Act. After several challenges and clarifications in 1991–2001, dogs were excluded from the ban, but lions were added to it.

=== Turkey ===
In July 2021, Turkey banned the opening of circuses which use animals. Existing facilities will cease operations in ten years.

== Europe ==
As of 2026, the use of animals in circuses has been partially or entirely banned in all member states of the European Union, except for Germany, where only local bans exist. Most restrictions involve wild animals or wild mammals, but leave open any other species.

=== Austria, Croatia and the European Union ===
When Austria adopted a nationalwide total ban on the keeping of wild animals in circuses, effective 1 January 2005, (Note: Paragraph 27 of the Austrian Animal Protection Act [Tierschutzgesetz]: "Species of wild animals are not allowed to be kept in circuses, variety show institutions and similar facilities. (...)".) a circus association lodged a complaint at the European Commission, citing the "free movement of services". After seeking clarification with the Austrian authorities, the Commission decided not to launch an infraction procedure against Austria. This prompted the circus association to lodge a complaint at the European Ombudsman, who reasoned that the Commission had inadequately motivated its decision, as the proportionality of Austria's measure in restricting the free movement of services was not tested. By July 2007, Croatia had also adopted nationalwide bans on certain circus animals, and the national government of the Netherlands was considering it after the Dutch municipality of Winschoten lost a court case over its competence to locally ban non-domesticated animals from circuses. Dutch Agriculture Minister Gerda Verburg rejected the idea of a national ban (following Austria and Croatia's example), but offered to explore the option of an EU-wide ban instead. In a letter dated 18 September 2009 to the European Ombudsman, the European Commission clarified its position by saying Austria could restrict the free movement of services, because the protection of animal welfare could constitute an "overriding reason of general interest" (an acceptable exception to Article 56 TFEU established by CFEU case law). For reasons having to do with the complicated historical-cultural development of views on animal welfare across various societies, the Commission found that it was within the purview of the member states to decide how animal welfare should be best protected, and that the Commission was not required to pass judgement on the proportionality of measures taken by member states in this regard. In November 2007, Verburg responded by repeating her earlier objections to a national ban in the Netherlands.

=== Greece ===
Greece became the first European country to ban any animal from performing in any circus in its territory in February 2012, following a campaign by Animal Defenders International and the Greek Animal Welfare Fund (GAWF).

=== Germany ===
In 2018 in Germany, an accident with an elephant during a circus performance prompted calls to ban animal performances in circuses. PETA called the German politicians to outlaw the keeping of animals for circuses.

As of 2019, Germany was the only EU member state which had not imposed a national ban or restriction on the use of (wild) animals in circuses. The Bundestag voted against such a ban on 24 October 2019. In August 2020, Federal Minister of Agriculture Julia Klöckner announced she was working on a bill to ban certain species (such as giraffes, hippos, and rhinoceroses) from circuses. This fell far short of the demands formulated by most welfarist groups, who alleged that 82% of German citizens and the Agriculture Ministers of all 16 states of Germany were in favour of a broad national ban, while more than 100 cities and municipal councils had reportedly already enacted local bans on wild animals in circuses.

In the 2020s, there has been growing political debate in Germany about the introduction of a nation-wide ban on the use of wild animals in circuses, and a 2021 survey conducted by the Eurogroup for Animals estimates that over 150 wild animals in around 75 circuses were performing throughout Germany.

=== France ===
On 29 September 2020, the Environment Minister of France, Barbara Pompili, announced a ban on wild animals in circuses.

=== Netherlands ===
In late 2012, the Dutch government announced a ban on the use of wild circus animals. On 15 September 2015, the Government of the Netherlands banned the use of wild mammals in circuses, such as lions, tigers and elephants. This also meant that transporting wild mammals for this purpose was henceforth prohibited. The Decision on the List of Circus Animals (Besluit Circusdierenlijst, effective 1 July 2024; last amended 21 June 2025) clarified which non-wild mammals that may still be used as circus animals, including donkeys, horses, dogs, domestic cats, llamas, alpacas and camels. However, the city of Almere in 2025 decided to prohibit any and all circuses featuring animals, citing both arguments for animal welfare and human public health. Other major cities such as Amsterdam, Rotterdam, The Hague, Utrecht, and Groningen have a strict policy of discouraging circuses with animal shows holding events within their territory. They give preferential treatment to animal-free circuses, and impose strict requirements for circuses which do want to perform animal shows; but unlike Almere, these cities have not enacted a complete prohibition.

=== United Kingdom ===
In 1998 in the United Kingdom, a parliamentary working group chaired by MP Roger Gale studied living conditions and treatment of animals in UK circuses. All members of this group agreed that a change in the law was needed to protect circus animals. Gale told the BBC, "It's undignified and the conditions under which they are kept are woefully inadequate—the cages are too small, the environments they live in are not suitable and many of us believe the time has come for that practice to end." The group reported concerns about boredom and stress, and noted that an independent study by a member of the Wildlife Conservation Research Unit at Oxford University "found no evidence that circuses contribute to education or conservation".

In 2007, a different working group under the UK Department for Environment, Food and Rural Affairs reached a different conclusion after reviewing information from experts representing both the circus industry and animal welfare. That group found an absence of "scientific evidence sufficient to demonstrate that travelling circuses are not compatible with meeting the welfare needs of any type of non-domesticated animal presently being used in the United Kingdom". According to a report they published in October 2007, "there appears to be little evidence to demonstrate that the welfare of animals kept in travelling circuses is any better or any worse than that of animals kept in other captive environments".

A ban prohibiting the use of wild animals in circuses in England was due to be passed in 2015, but Conservative MP Christopher Chope repeatedly blocked the bill under the reasoning that "The EU Membership Costs and Benefits bill should have been called by the clerk before the circuses bill, so I raised a point of order". He explained that the circus bill was "at the bottom of the list" for discussion. The Animal Defenders International non-profit group dubbed this "a huge embarrassment for Britain that 30 other nations have taken action before us on this simple and popular measure".

On 1 May 2019 Environmental Secretary Michael Gove announced a new Bill to ban the use of wild animals in travelling circuses. The Wild Animals in Circuses Act 2019 came into effect on 20 January 2020.

==== Wales ====
A bill to ban the use of wild animals in travelling circuses in Wales was introduced in June 2019, and the Wild Animals and Circuses (Wales) Act 2020 was subsequently passed by the Welsh Parliament on 15 July 2020. The people of Wales made over 6,500 responses to the public consultation on the draft Bill, 97% of which supported the ban.

==== Scotland ====
The use of wild animals in travelling circuses has been banned in Scotland. The Wild Animals in Travelling Circuses (Scotland) Act 2018 came into force on 28 May 2018.

== North America and the Caribbean ==
=== Honduras ===
On November 12, 2015, the Honduran National Congress approved the Animal Welfare Act which banned the use of all animals in circuses.

=== Mexico ===
Elephant act at a 2009 circus in Pachuca, Hidalgo, Mexico

In December 2014, as a response to reports of animal mistreatment, the Mexican Congress passed a law banning the use of animals in any circus in the country. The law set fines for violations and required circuses to submit lists of the wildlife they possessed, which would then be made available to zoos interested in taking the animals.

=== Panama ===
Law 308 on the Protection of Animals was approved by the National Assembly of Panama on 15 March 2012. Article 7 of the law states: "Dog fights, animal races, bullfights – whether of the Spanish or Portuguese style – the breeding, entry, permanence and operation in the national territory of all kinds of circus or circus show that uses trained animals of any species, are prohibited".

=== United States ===
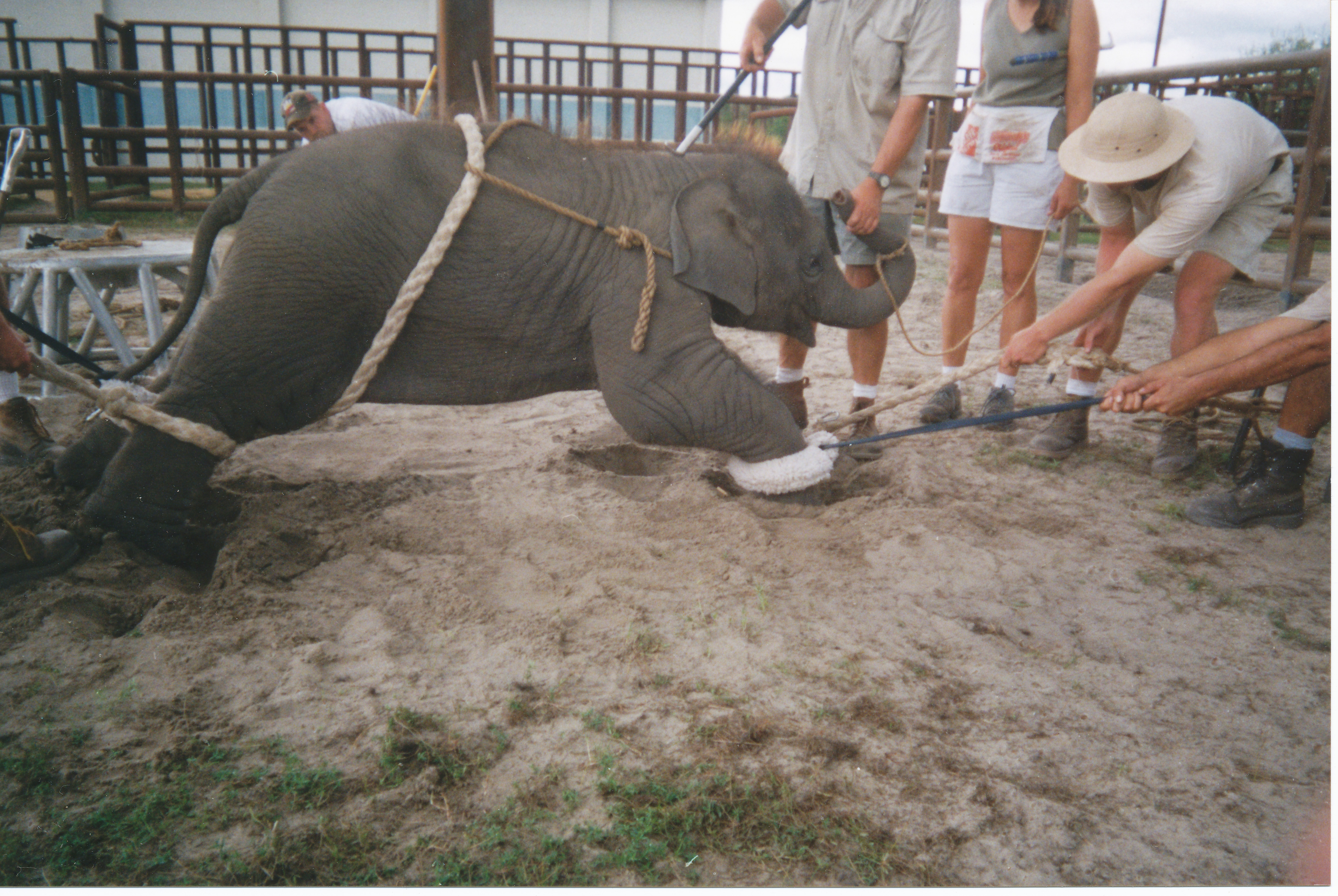
Circus baby elephant training by Ringling Bros. and Barnum & Bailey Circus (c. 2001)

During a Circus International performance in Honolulu, Hawaii, on 20 August 1994, an elephant called Tyke (1974 – 20 August 1994) killed her trainer, Allen Campbell, and severely mauled her groomer, Dallas Beckwith, in front of hundreds of spectators. She then escaped the arena and ran through the streets of Kakaʻako for more than thirty minutes. Police fired 86 shots at Tyke, who eventually collapsed from the wounds and died. Tyke posthumously became a symbol of circus tragedies and of animal rights. Lawsuits were filed against the City of Honolulu, the State of Hawaii, Circus International, Tyke's owner John Cuneo Jr. and Cuneo's company, Hawthorn Corporation. The incident inspired legislation on local levels in Hawaii and abroad. California Congressman Sam Farr introduced legislation (Note: HR2323) into the House of Representatives in 1999 and again in 2012.

According to PETA, although the US Animal Welfare Act does not permit any sort of punishment that puts the animals in discomfort, trainers will still go against this law and use such things as electric rods and bullhooks. According to PETA, during an undercover investigation of Carson & Barnes Circus, video footage was captured showing animal care director Tim Frisco training endangered Asian elephants with electrical shock prods and instructing other trainers to "beat the elephants with a bullhook as hard as they can and sink the sharp metal hook into the elephant's flesh and twist it until they scream in pain".

In testimony in U.S. District Court in 2009, Ringling Bros. and Barnum & Bailey Circus CEO Kenneth Feld acknowledged that circus elephants are struck behind the ears, under the chin and on their legs with metal tipped prods, called bullhooks. Feld stated that these practices are necessary to protect circus workers. Feld also acknowledged that an elephant trainer was reprimanded for using an electric shock device, known as a hot shot or electric prod, on an elephant, which Feld also stated was appropriate practice. Feld denied that any of these practices harm elephants. In its January 2010 verdict on the case, brought against Feld Entertainment International by the American Society for the Prevention of Cruelty to Animals et al., the Court ruled that evidence against the circus company was "not credible with regard to the allegations". In lieu of a USDA hearing, Feld Entertainment, Inc. (parent of Ringling Bros.) agreed to pay an unprecedented US$270,000 fine for violations of the Animal Welfare Act that allegedly occurred between June 2007 and August 2011.

A 14-year litigation against the Ringling Bros. and Barnum & Bailey Circus came to an end in 2014 when The Humane Society of the United States and a number of other animal rights groups paid a $16 million settlement to Feld Entertainment. The circus discontinued its elephant act in May 2016 and sent its pachyderms to a reserve. Ticket sales declined steeply, and the circus closed in May 2017 after a 146-year run.

City ordinances banning performances by wild animals have been enacted in San Francisco (2015), Los Angeles (2017), and New York City (2017).

In December 2018, New Jersey became the first state in the U.S. to ban circuses, carnivals and fairs from featuring elephants, tigers, and other exotic animals.

== South America ==
=== Bolivia ===
In 2009, Bolivia passed legislation banning the use of any animals, wild or domestic, in circuses. The law states that circuses "constitute an act of cruelty." Circus operators had one year from the bill's passage on 1 July 2009 to comply.

=== Colombia ===
Law 1638 of 2013 prohibits the use of wild animals in circuses in Colombia.

=== Uruguay ===
Unlike most other South American countries, Uruguay has not enacted a broad prohibition on animals in circuses. Law No. 18,471 ("Law on the Responsible Tenure of Animals"), enacted in 2009, established general animal welfare regulations, but not specifically to improve the living conditions of animals in circuses.

== Bibliography ==
- Mitra, Partha Pratim; Sharma, Prakash (2020). "Role of the Supreme Court in Developing 'Animal Rights' Jurisprudence in India: A Study". Journal of the Indian Law Institute. 62 (3). Indian Law Institute: 239–262. ISSN 0019-5731. JSTOR 27296713.
- Nisha, P.R. (2017). "Ban and benevolence: Circus, animals and Indian state". The Indian Economic & Social History Review. 54 (2): 239–266. doi:10.1177/0019464617695676. ISSN 0019-4646.
