= List of Mexican films of 1963 =

A list of the films produced in Mexico in 1963 (see 1963 in film):

== 1963 ==
Title	Director	Cast	Genre	Notes
1963
Cri Cri el grillito cantor	Tito Davison	Ignacio López Tarso, Marga López		
Días de otoño	Roberto Gavaldón	Ignacio López Tarso, Pina Pellicer		Pellicer won Best Actress at the 1964 Mar del Plata International Film Festival
Las Troyanas	Sergio Véjar	Ofelia Guilmáin, Beatriz Sheridan, Carmen Montejo		
Las luchadoras contra el médico asesino	Rene Cardona	Elizabeth Campbell, Lorena Velázquez		
Paloma herida	Emilio Fernández	Patricia Conde, Columba Domínguez		
Dile que la quiero	Fernando Cortés	César Costa, Patricia Conde		
Entrega inmediata	Miguel M. Delgado	Cantinflas, Gina Romand, Fanny Cano		
Barridos y regados	Jaime Salvador	Viruta y Capulina, María Duval, Begoña Palacios		
Los invisibles	Jaime Salvador	Viruta y Capulina, Martha Elena Cervantes		
Santo en el museo de cera	Alfonso Corona Blake	Santo, Claudio Brook, Rubén Rojo		
The Paper Man	Ismael Rodríguez			
Los signos del zodiaco	Sergio Véjar			Entered into the 3rd Moscow International Film Festival
La invasión de los vampiros	Miguel Morayta	Bertha Moss	Horror	
Una joven de 16 años	Gilberto Martínez Solares	Patricia Conde, Julio Alemán, Enrique Rambal, Tere Velázquez		
Santo contra el cerebro diabolico	Federico Curiel	Santo		
