= Dangerous Wild Animals Act 1976 =

Act of the Parliament of the United Kingdom

Dangerous Wild Animals Act 1976 (Note: Section 10(1).)
- Act of Parliament
- Parliament of the United Kingdom
- Long title: An Act to regulate the keeping of certain kinds of dangerous wild animals.
- Citation: 1976 c. 38
- Territorial extent: England and Wales; Scotland; (Note: Section 10(3).)

Dates
- Royal assent: 22 July 1976
- Commencement: 22 October 1976 (Note: Section 10(2).)
Other legislation
Amended by	Criminal Procedure (Scotland) Act 1975; Zoo Licensing Act 1981; Criminal Justice Act 1982; Local Government (Wales) Act 1994; Local Government etc. (Scotland) Act 1994; Animal Welfare Act 2006; Animal Health and Welfare (Scotland) Act 2006 (Consequential Provisions) Order 2006; Dangerous Wild Animals Act 1976 (Modification) (No.2) Order 2007; Dangerous Wild Animals Act 1976 (Modification) (Scotland) Order 2008; Legislative Reform (Dangerous Wild Animals) (Licensing) Order 2010; Animals (Scientific Procedures) Act 1986 Amendment Regulations 2012; Animal Welfare (Breeding of Dogs) (Wales) Regulations 2014; Animal Welfare (Licensing of Activities Involving Animals) (England) Regulations 2018; Wild Animals in Circuses Act 2019; Wild Animals and Circuses (Wales) Act 2020; Animal Health and Welfare (Scotland) Act 2006 (Consequential Provisions) Order 2022

Status: Amended

Text of statute as originally enacted

Revised text of statute as amended

Text of the Dangerous Wild Animals Act 1976 as in force today (including any amendments) within the United Kingdom, from legislation.gov.uk.

The Dangerous Wild Animals Act 1976 (c. 38) is an act of the Parliament of the United Kingdom. It was originally enacted to deal with the increasing fashion of people in the late-1960s and early-1970s keeping interesting pets which were often from the more dangerous species, as well as hybrids between wild and domestic species, such as wolfdogs and Bengal cats. It was increasingly seen as unacceptable—in regard to public safety—for the average citizen to be able to acquire a potentially dangerous animal without some form of regulatory control.

Its purpose was to ensure that when private individuals kept dangerous wild animals, they do so in circumstances which do not create a risk to the public, and which safeguard the welfare of the animals.

The act's schedule designates the species covered, such as many primates, carnivores, larger or venomous reptiles, dangerous spiders and scorpions. Keeping such animals without a licence is unlawful and the state is also allowed to specify where and how the animal is to be kept. This law also requires keepers to have their animals covered by a satisfactory liability insurance policy.

== Provisions ==
Licences are required for any animal listed on a schedule under the law. These licences will only be granted when the authority is satisfied that it would not be contrary to public interest, not on the grounds of safety or nuisance and that the animal's accommodation is adequate and secure.

Where the local authority grant a licence it shall impose conditions on the licence covering issues such as: -

- a requirement that the animal be kept only by a person or persons named on the licence;
- restrictions on the movement of the animal from the premises as specified on the licence; and
- a requirement that the licence holder has a current insurance policy which ensures both licence holders and others against any liability caused by the animal.

== Species scheduled as dangerous ==
The act has two separate but almost identical schedules, respectively applicable to England and Wales and to Scotland. These give the scientific name of the relevant taxon, sometimes with a common name gloss.

Mammals:

- Macropodidae: the western grey, eastern grey, and red kangaroo; the wallaroo
- most primates; except night monkeys, titi, squirrel monkeys, and bamboo lemurs
- the Tasmanian devil
- All bears, camels, elephants, eared seals, Giraffidae, Hippopotamidae, Rhinocerotidae, peccary, tapir, zebras and walrus
- the aardvark, fossa, giant armadillo, giant anteater, and pronghorn
- Bovidae except the domestic cattle, buffalo, goat, and sheep
- Canidae except the fox, culpeo, grey zorro, raccoon dogs, and domestic dog
- Equidae except the donkey and domestic horse
- Larger Felidae
- Many Mustelidae, but not the European otter
- Suidae except the domestic pig (farmed wild boar is also excepted in Scotland)
- the African, large-spotted, Malay and Indian civets (the genera Civettictis and Viverra)
- True seals except the common seal and grey seal
- Hyenas except the aardwolf
- Moose and Caribou except domestic reindeer
- Many hybrids where one or both parents are classified as dangerous

Birds:

- cassowary, ostrich

Reptiles:

- Crocodilians: all Alligatoridae, Crocodylidae, Gavialidae
- Snakes: all Atractaspis, Elapidae, Hydrophiidae, Viperidae; many Colubridae
- All Helodermatidae

Invertebrates:

- Spiders: All Ctenidae, Hexathelidae, Sicariidae, Theridiidae
- Scorpions: All Buthidae; and Hemiscorpius lepturus
