= Carmela Rey =

Mexican singer and actress (1931–2018)

- Born: María del Carmen Sánchez Levi; 7 December 1931; Xalapa, Veracruz, Mexico
- Died: 13 February 2018 (aged 86); Mexico City, Mexico
- Occupations: Singer, actress
- Years active: 1955–2000
- Spouse: Rafael Vázquez (m. 1959; died 2018)

María del Carmen Sánchez Levi (7 December 1931 – 13 February 2018), known as Carmela Rey, was a Mexican singer and actress, specialized in the musical genre of bolero.

One of the last official vocalists of Agustín Lara, she became famous in the 1950s as a soloist on radio and television programs, and recorded exclusively for Musart Records and later for RCA Records. In movies, she had starring roles in A sablazo limpio (1958), Viva la parranda (1960), Las hijas del Amapolo (1962), and Escuela para solteras (1965).

With her husband, singer Rafael Vázquez, she formed a duet named Carmela y Rafael, "The Romantic Couple of Mexico", which was hugely successful in the 1960s and 1970s.

== Life and career ==
Carmela Rey was born in Xalapa, the capital of Veracruz, Mexico. Her parents were Vicente Sánchez Rebolledo and Dinah Levi Rey. She took her stage name from her maternal grandmother, Isabel Rey. Carmela finished her primary and secondary school in Mexico City, and learned solfège, harmony, history of music, and Italian at the Conservatorio Nacional de Música. She was also a student of the famous Mexican contralto Fanny Anitúa.

Rey began her career participating in recitals at Mexico City's Palacio de Bellas Artes, but she married and went abroad to live with her husband. She made a comeback singing in her own radio programs and performing at the posh Capri nightclub in Mexico City. Rey also made her television debut, and one of her TV programs remained on the air for 26 consecutive weeks. Her popularity spread to other Latin American countries, including Cuba, Colombia and Venezuela.

Her great beauty and natural charm attracted the attention of film producers Óscar J. Brooks and Ernesto Enríquez, who signed her for the female lead opposite Viruta y Capulina and Chilean bolero singer Lucho Gatica in A sablazo limpio (1958), a comedy set in the Spanish empire of the 18th century.

Rey also made musical appearances in La mujer marcada (1957) and Mi mujer necesita marido (1959), and played one of the leading roles in Yo pecador (1959), a biopic of Mexican tenor-turned-priest José Mojica. These performances were followed by three more starring roles, in the films Viva la parranda (1960), with Miguel Aceves Mejía, Lucho Gatica and Guillermina Téllez Girón; Las hijas del Amapolo (1962), with José Elías Moreno, Lucha Moreno, María Eugenia Rubio and Angélica María; and Escuela para solteras (1965), with Flor Silvestre, Fanny Cano, Alma Delia Fuentes, Lucha Moreno and Sara García.

== Death ==
Rey died at around 9:00 am on 13 February 2018 in Mexico City. She was 86 years old. Her grandson revealed the cause of her death to be "a heart attack and she was asleep, so when we found her she was in her bed; and although she suffered from hypertension this was not the cause of her death". Her husband, who is in delicate health, was not able to attend her funeral service. Her remains were cremated on 14 February.

== Discography ==
- Carmela Rey con las orquestas de José Sabre Marroquín y Enrico Cabiati (Musart M270)
- Carmela Rey interpreta a Agustín Lara (Musart D369)
- Carmela Rey - Agustín Lara (RCA Víctor MKL-1600)
- Amar y vivir (Musart 1564)
- Los hits de Carmela Rey

== Filmography ==
Year	Title	Role	Notes
1957	La mujer marcada	Singer	
1958	A sablazo limpio	Rosaura	Film debut
1959	Mi mujer necesita marido	Singer	
1959	Yo pecador	Florita	
1960	Viva la parranda	Chole	
1962	Las hijas del Amapolo	Luz	
1965	Escuela para solteras	Lucero	
