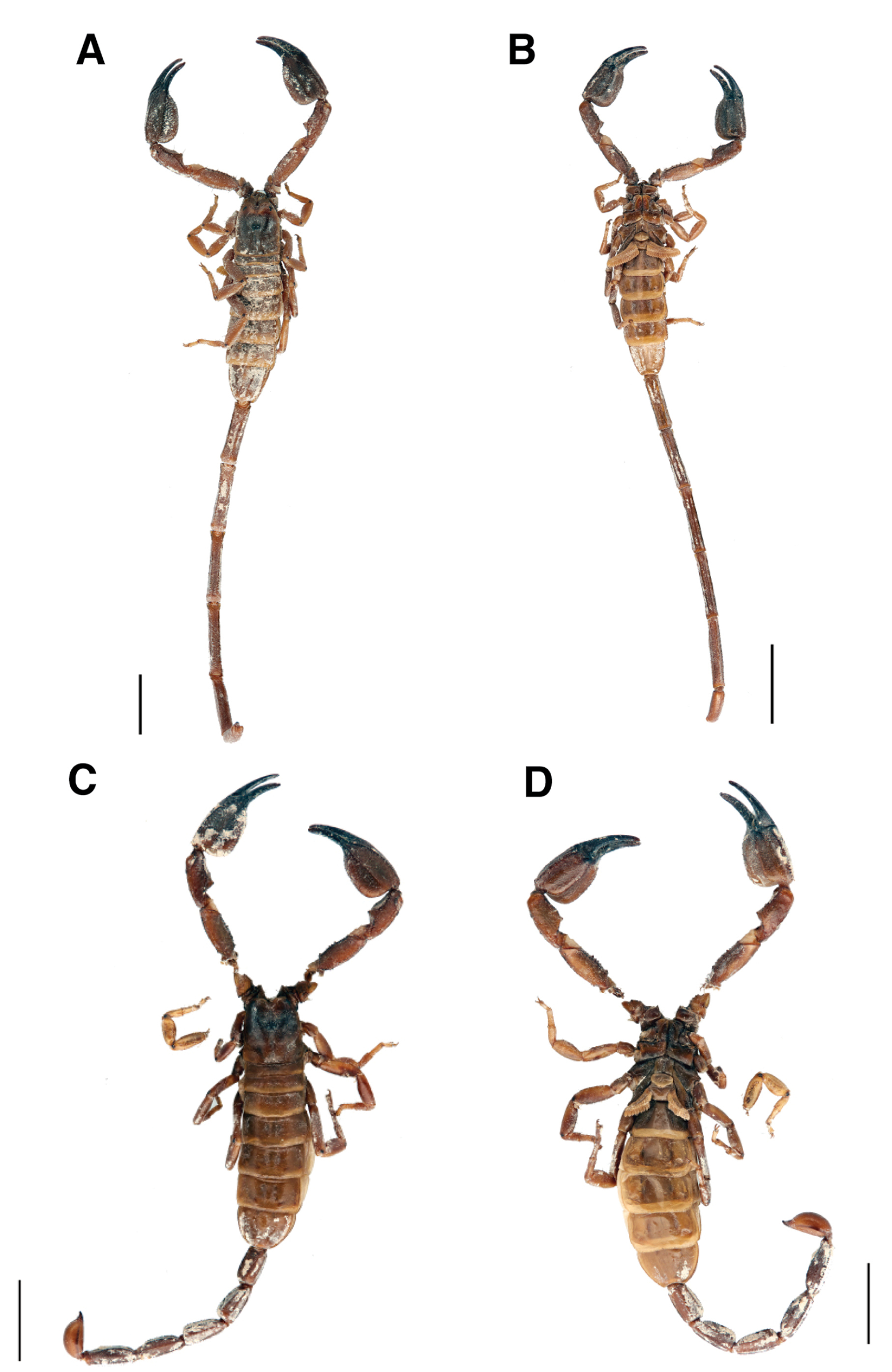
- Hemiscorpius lepturus A, B: Male C, D: Female

Scientific classification
- Kingdom: Animalia
- Phylum: Arthropoda
- Subphylum: Chelicerata
- Class: Arachnida
- Order: Scorpiones
- Family: Hemiscorpiidae
- Genus: Hemiscorpius
- Species: H. lepturus

Binomial name
- Hemiscorpius lepturus Peters, 1861

= Hemiscorpius lepturus =

Species of scorpion

Hemiscorpius lepturus is a species of scorpion in the family Hemiscorpiidae. It is found in deserts of the Middle East, especially in southern Iraq and Iran, where it is sometimes referred to as the "Gadim scorpion". These scorpions have long, thin tails and wide bodies and grow to 8 cm (3.1 in) in males and 5.5 cm (2.2 in) in females, allowing them to live in tight rock crevices. They are fairly solitary creatures. H. lepturus has mainly been studied to discover the components and effects of its venom, which is highly dangerous and is responsible for most deaths due to scorpion sting in the Iran area. H. lepturus is the only scorpion not in the family Buthidae that is potentially lethal to humans; the Buthidae family is the largest and most abundant family of scorpions, containing many highly venomous species.

== Taxonomy ==
Hemiscorpius lepturus is one of 17 species in the Hemiscorpius genus, which is the sole genus of the Hemiscorpiidae family. The Hemiscorpiidae family was previously known as Ischnuridae, but was changed due to there being a family of damselflies with the same name. This family was also called Liochelidae at one point. The Hemiscorpiidae family is under the superfamily Scorpionoidea. This superfamily belongs to a parvorder called Lurida, and the order Scorpiones, which encompasses all scorpions. This order falls under the Arachnida class, which includes scorpions, spiders, mites, and ticks. The Arachnida class is under the sub-phylum Chelicerata, which also includes spiders, mites, horseshoe crabs, and sea spiders. Finally, H. lepturus' phylum is Arthropoda, shared with other organisms such as insects and crustaceans, and its Kingdom is Animalia.

== Body plan / anatomy ==
Hemiscorpius lepturus is separated into seven sets of paired appendages. First, the chelicerae, or large jaws used for manipulating food. This is a common feature among all members of the sub-phylum Chelicerata. Next, the pedipalps, or the claws. This scorpion has four sets of legs, common in all Arachnids. The next body segment included the pectines, which are a pair of comb-like structures on the ventral surface of the scorpion near the genital area. After that comes the segmented tail, which curves upward and consists of five individual articulated segments. Tail segments are longer in males. Lastly comes the telson, which consists of the venom glands and the stinger of the scorpion.

Hemiscorpius lepturus are pulmonate, utilizing book lungs, a shared characteristic among some Arachnids, including spiders. Air enters the body through small openings called spiracles, and exits through tracheae.

== Description ==
Hemiscorpius lepturus are yellow/brown in color and have a flat, broad body plan. This body style allows them to live in tight rock crevices easily. They are mainly distinguished from other scorpion species by their trichobothria, although there is no known dichotomous key for this species. These are small hair-like structures that occur along the fixed fingers of Arachnida that detect airborne vibrations and currents, as well as electrical charges.

In H. lepturus, trichobothria ib and it (location markers) of the pedipalp chela are halfway along the finger of the scorpion, as opposed to being at the base of the finger in all species (excluding Nebinae, where trichobothria ib is organized basally, and it distally on the fixed finger). Other distinctions include the presence of three pairs of lateral ocelli (eyes), a moveable cheliceral finger with external and internal teeth, and hemispermatophores (a pair of internal male reproductive structures) with a double lamellar hook. The telson vesicles of mature H. lepturus males are elongated compared to adult females and other species, and have two distal lobes at the base of the stinger. Female H. lepturus have a bulky telson with no distal lobes.

Sexual dimorphism between male and female individual H. lepturus is present in the length of their tails. Males have longer tails and telsons than females do. H. lepturus is also distinguished sexually by the number of abdominal pectine denticles. Females have between 9 and 12 pectines, where males have between 14 and 16.

== Venom ==
The venom of H. lepturus is highly cytotoxic and hemolytic, meaning it is especially destructive to living blood cells. A sting from H. lepturus will induce severe dermonecrotic scorpionism; effects of the sting include serious wounds, skin inflammation, internal hemorrhages, secondary renal failure, and blisters or ulcers. Some cases result in acute renal failure, which will occasionally result in hemolytic–uremic syndrome (HUS), resulting in hemolytic anemia and bloody diarrhea. The healing process after a sting is slow and painful, and usually results in scars.

Venoms with similar effects are found in spiders as well, and are only found in three genera: Cheiracanthium, Loxoscoles, and Sicarius. The Loxoscoles genus contains the infamous brown recluse spider, Loxoscoles reclusa. This spider is known to have one of the most lethal bites due to its cytotoxic venom. Other Hemiscorpius species probably have venom with similar effects, but H. lepturus is the most common and most documented.

Five neurotoxins have been discovered in the venom of H. lepturus: OD1, Odk1, Hemicalcin, Hemitoxin, and Heminecrolysin. These toxins all contribute to the cytotoxic and hemolytic effects of this venom. Along with these toxins, this venom also contains lytic enzymes that break down ester bonds in cell membranes.

General symptoms after being stung include dry mouth, thirst, dizziness, confusion, nausea, fever, vomiting, and convulsions. These symptoms gradually worsen, and are especially lethal in children. The only available treatment against the effects of this venom is administration of an available polyvalent anti-venom, an injection designed to combat the venom's effects. Recent studies on H. lepturus venom have shown that it has inhibitory effects on the growth and reproduction of human immunodeficiency virus 1 (HIV-1). Further research must be done before this venom is accepted as a possible treatment for HIV-1.

== Behavior ==
One of H. lepturus only known behaviors is its shedding technique. This scorpion breaks through its exoskeleton by breaking it where the carapace meets the sides of the body. The chelicerae are then forced out of the old cuticle, and the scorpion contracts to force itself out of the exoskeleton. This process has been observed taking between four and six hours. After shedding, the scorpion's body appears colorless on the abdomen, legs, chelicerae, pedipalps, and tail. The only dark spots are the eyes and at the very end of the tail. The scorpion's body is then soft for two to three days. During this time the scorpion's movement is slow and limited, and it does not drive its telson to sting at prey because of the soft state of the body. Melanization, or re-coloration of the body, takes between ten and thirty days, and the new cuticle formed is again a yellowish/brown color.

== Reproduction ==
Hemiscorpius lepturus, same as all scorpions, are ovoviviparous: the male scorpion will deposit a spermatophore, he then pulls female scorpion over the spermatophore so that it enters her genital opening, the pair will remain in that position for up to several minutes to ensure the spermatophore is deposited in the female's body. In the pregnant female, the young are arranged side by side, which gives the scorpion a distinct appearance. Gestation time for H. lepturus is unknown. Delivery can take up to six hours, and some mother scorpions die during this process. During delivery, the space between the carapace and the abdomen is contracted so the genital opening and pectines are in position to give birth. Offspring leave the mother's body tail-first, which is facilitated by slight movements by the young and contractile movements by the mother. Offspring are piled between the mother's legs during birth, and they are led onto her back by the mother after all have been born. The average amount of offspring H. lepturus have is 24.3 per delivery. The offspring will stay on the mothers back for a period of time until they are mature enough to leave and disperse.

== Habitat ==
Hemiscorpius lepturus is found in warm, humid climates, typically in the Middle East. These scorpions are heavily concentrated in southern Iraq and Iran, where they are responsible for the majority of deaths due to scorpion sting. H. lepturus has also been found in Oman, Saudi Arabia, Yemen, Pakistan, and the United Arab Emirates. H. lepturus live in tight rock crevices and cracks to protect them from predators like centipedes, emerging to ambush prey like spiders and other insects. Once prey is caught the scorpion will secrete enzymes that will dissolve the prey until it is liquid enough to eat.
