= HTX =

HTX may refer to:

- Hashitoxicosis
- Heart transplantation
- Heat exchanger
- Hemitoxin
- Higher Technical Examination Programme of the Danish educational system
- Home Team Science and Technology Agency, a statutory board in the Singapore government focusing on science and technology in public security
- Homothorax
- Houston, Texas, United States
- HTX (cryptocurrency exchange)
- Middle Hittite language, an extinct language of Anatolia
- ZIC3, a protein
- HyperTransport Expansion connector, part of the HyperTransport specification
