= María Eugenia Rubio =

María Eugenia Rubio may refer to:

- María Eugenia Rubio (singer), Mexican singer and actress
- María Eugenia Rubio (footballer), Mexican footballer

== See also ==
- María Rubio, Mexican actress
- María Carmen Rubio, Spanish archer
