= Green Brigade =

Celtic F.C. supporter ultra group

- Founded: 2006
- Type: Ultras group, football supporters group
- Club: Celtic F.C.
- Location: Glasgow, Scotland
- Stadium: Celtic Park
- Stand: North Curve
- Membership: 300
- Colors
- Website: https://green-brigade.com

The Green Brigade are a Celtic F.C. supporter ultra group formed in 2006. They are situated in the North Curve corner section of Celtic Park.

== History ==
=== Founding and early years ===
In 2007, the first iteration of a Celtic ultras group was founded. Known as the Jungle Bhoys. In 2006, members of the Jungle Bhoys split from the group to form the Green Brigade. The Green Brigade was formed with the fact in mind that Celtic was historically a left-leaning club, with shows of solidarity towards Ireland and Palestine being common.

Members of the early Green Brigade congregated in the back rows of the North Curve Stand Celtic Park. Initially, they had no affiliation with the club, with the group sneaking in banners and flags before matches.

In 2010, Celtic allocated 300 seats to the Green Brigade in the front of the North Curve, where they still sit to this day.

=== Poppy protest of 2010 and further disorder ===
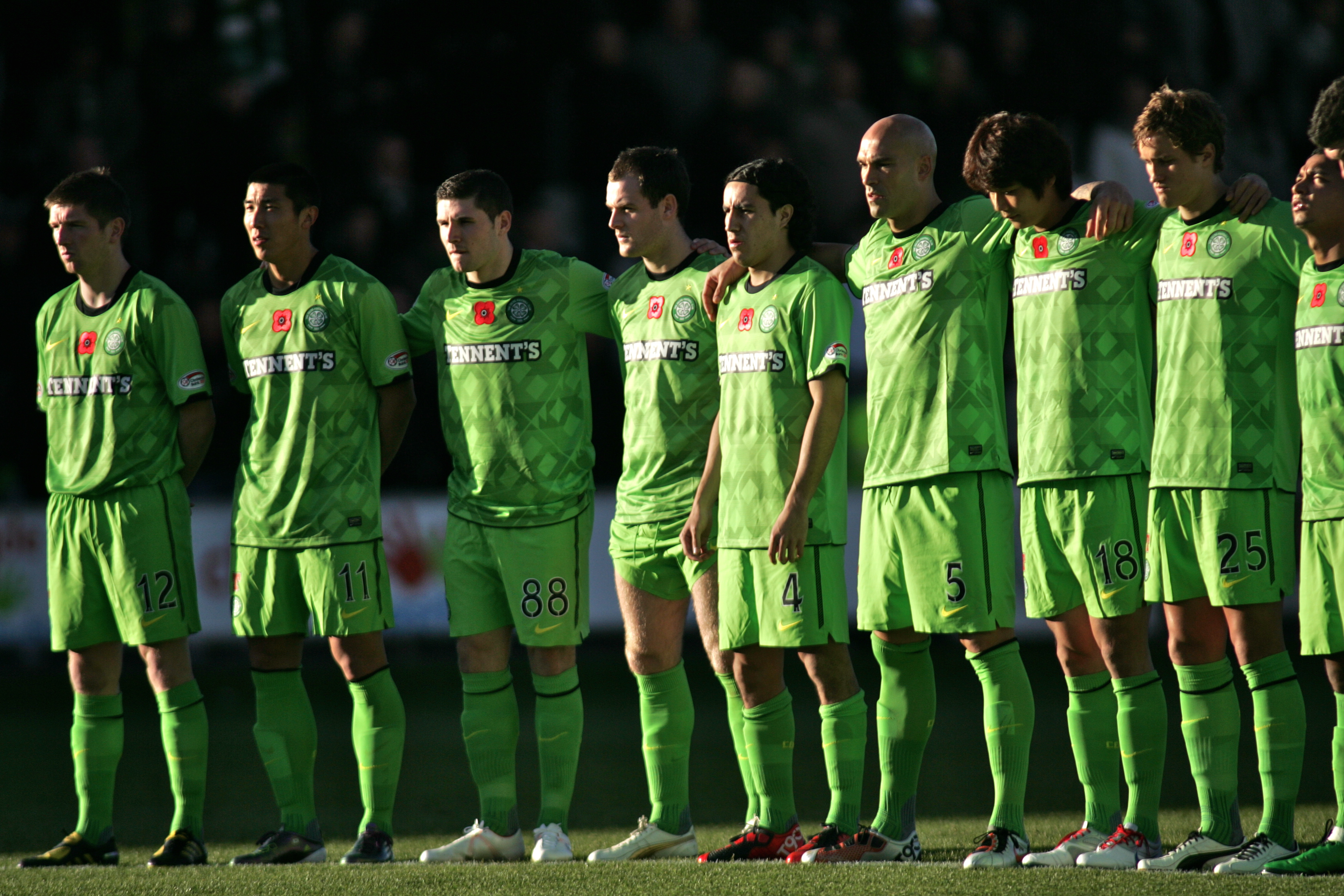
Celtic players with poppies on their shirts, November 2010

At a match against Aberdeen in November 2010, the Green Brigade unfurled two banners with the words "Your deeds would shame all the devils in Hell. Ireland, Iraq, Afghanistan. No bloostained [sic] poppy on our Hoops." This protest was against the placing of the remembrance poppy on Celtic's shirt for the match against St Mirren on 11 November 2010. Celtic expressed disapproval of these protests, saying they were damaging to the image of the club and its fans, and pledged to ban those involved.

The Glasgow Herald reported that in the weeks leading up to the incident, the Green Brigade had stepped up pro-IRA chants. Celtic have been investigated by UEFA in the past for alleged sectarian behaviour, including pro-IRA chants. In 2011, UEFA and the Scottish Premier League (SPL) investigated Celtic over pro-IRA chants by fans at different games. UEFA fined Celtic £12,700, while the SPL took no action, as the club had taken all reasonable action to prevent the chants.

At a match against Dundee United in November 2010, there was serious disorder in the section occupied by the Green Brigade when a supporter was being ejected by stewards. Supporters charged at the security guards and one was left with a bloody lip after a coin was reportedly thrown.

In April 2011 at the Scottish Cup semi-final against Aberdeen, police officers attempted to remove a supporter who had set off a flare inside the stadium. Police were unable to remove the supporter because other fans held onto him. Four supporters were later held by police in connection with the incident. More than 100 Green Brigade members walked out of the stadium in protest at the arrests.

In April 2011 some members of the Green Brigade were not sent season ticket renewal forms after the club threatened to disperse the group around other sections of the stadium.

The Green Brigade ultras during a match against FC Salzburg in Salzburg.

UEFA head of communications William Gaillard, when talking about the matter in 2006, said that chants related to the IRA were not sectarian, and support for the IRA was a nationalist issue – similar to fans of other clubs, such as FC Barcelona and Athletic Bilbao, who support nationalist movements in their own countries. He also stated that in Balkan countries, some fans show support for political organisations that had engaged in ethnic cleansing, which is a different situation because those organisations are by their nature discriminatory. He said that in his opinion this did not apply to the Irish Republican Army (IRA).

On Celtic's last game of the 2011–12 season, the Green Brigade organised a display of solidarity with Palestinian prisoners on hunger strike. This featured a banner reading "Dignity is More Precious than Food" alongside Palestinian flags. A spokesman for the Brigade stated: "We did this in solidarity, to raise awareness and because it's the right thing to do. We want Palestinians to know we are thinking about them and encourage Scottish civil society to look at the injustice in Palestine."

The Green Brigade expressed solidarity with Celtic manager Neil Lennon, who in 2011 had been attacked on the trackside by a Hearts supporter at Tynecastle and allegedly been sent letter bombs. After the last match of the 2011–12 season, Lennon 'presented' the Scottish Premier League trophy to the Green Brigade by placing it in front of the section where they sit. He later said, "I just wanted to say thank you to them because they have, week in, week out, created a great atmosphere. They sing non-stop. They add colour. Sometimes they are a little bit controversial, but in the main they have behaved themselves impeccably and they have changed the culture of the stadium. Its a fun place to come for the supporters, and the atmosphere in the big games has been fantastic. They are the catalyst for all of that."

In 2012, the Offensive Behaviour at Football Act was passed by the Scottish Parliament, banning sectarian chants at football matches across Scotland. Many Green Brigade members were arrested and banned from Celtic Park for violating the law. On 6 April 2013, the Green Brigade took part in a demonstration comprising 3,000 Celtic supporters as part of Fans Against Criminalisation, a body comprising the Green Brigade, the Celtic Trust, Celtic Supporters Association, the Affiliation of Registered Celtic Supporters Clubs and the Association of Irish Celtic Supporters Clubs. Although the march to Celtic Park after the demonstration had not been granted permission, raising concerns about dispersal amongst police, after the event Police Scotland said they were "delighted" by the conduct of the protesters. The protest was organised after a previous march that had not received council permission was broken up by police on 16 March.

The initial protest had been called over supporters receiving bans and what was described as "harassment by the police". The Green Brigade announced on its website that it would be holding a "corteo to Celtic Park to raise awareness and show support for the growing list of Celtic supporters receiving and facing bans from both the Club and the PF. It is no secret the level of harassment many fans receive at the hands of Strathclyde Police nor is Celtic PLCs complicity able to be ignored. As such there is an ever growing list of fans being denied their passion of following their team." Fans took to social media after the initial protest, posting pictures of mounted police and a group of supporters surrounded by police with batons being prevented from leaving the area. Celtic fans felt that the initial demonstration had been improperly policed and turned out to show their support for those demonstrators. The act, which gave rise to the protests, was eventually repealed in April 2018.

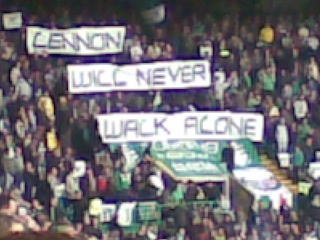
Banners paying tribute to Neil Lennon, March 2011

In November 2012, the Green Brigade organized a full stadium pre-match card display against Barcelona to celebrate Celtic's 125th anniversary. The display featured a Celtic cross, green and white hoops and 125 Celtic in written form, with supporters earning the praise of club chairman Peter Lawwell.

=== Temporary disbandment ===
Celtic made moves to disband the Green Brigade section at Celtic Park after trouble at a match against Motherwell at Fir Park on 9 December 2013, where fans damaged the stadium seating and threw flares onto the pitch, causing around £10,000 worth of damage. Celtic had already issued a warning to the group after safety breaches in August 2013, and following the incident at Fir Park, Celtic issued "precautionary" suspensions to 128 supporters. 250 season-ticket holders in the group's adopted section of the Celtic Park, section 111, were moved to other parts of the ground, or given the option of a refund for the rest of their season ticket.

"We will not allow the great name of Celtic to be damaged in this way – our supporters deserve more than this," said Celtic in a statement. The Green Brigade disputed the decision of the club and argued that its members were not responsible for the damage, but added it should have been more effective in self-policing.

While the Green Brigade was banned from Celtic Park, they would meet in a pub just outside Celtic Park to watch matches. Near the end of the 2013/14 season, the Green Brigade organized sections for 3 matches in Section 118.

=== Return to Celtic Park ===
Following this, in 2014, Celtic allowed the Green Brigade to return to Celtic Park.

Celtic were fined £8,619 by UEFA for supporters flying Palestinian flags at an August 2016 UEFA Champions League qualifying match against Hapoel Be'er Sheva at Celtic Park. The Green Brigade crowdfunded £176,076 in response, the balance of which it donated to Medical Aid for Palestinians and the Lajee Center in Bethlehem.

Criticism from the wider club was again directed at the Green Brigade for displaying a banner reading 'Victory to the Resistance' accompanied by Palestinian flags during a match. The Green Brigade released a statement on 11 October standing by their decision to display the banner and criticised the club for what they saw as hypocrisy.

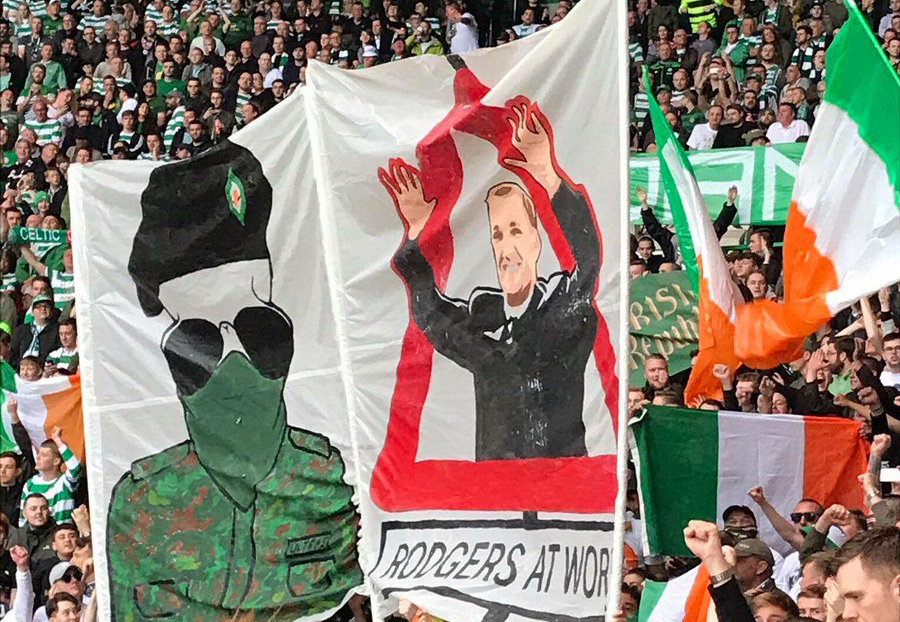
Banners featuring a "paramilitary-style" motif alongside Celtic manager Brendan Rodgers, displayed during a match with the Belfast-based, largely unionist club Linfield in 2017.

During the 2017–18 season, the second qualifying round draw set up an all-United Kingdom clash with Belfast club Linfield. In the leg held at Windsor Park, some Linfield supporters threw bottles and coins at Celtic players and sang sectarian songs. During the return fixture, "illicit banner" displays were produced and UEFA charged Celtic again. The banner "showed a paramilitary-type figure" next to an image of Brendan Rodgers, the Northern Irish manager of Celtic, under the words "Brendan's undefeated army"; the Daily Record accused the Green Brigade of designing the flags, and also claimed that the "undertones of the imagery were also clearly referring to the politics of Ireland while a section of Celtic fans were also heard singing pro-IRA songs during the powderkeg tie with the Belfast side. Linfield are seen as a Protestant Unionist club in Northern Ireland and fans of both sides had earlier hurled abuse at each other as they made their way into the stadium". Celtic elected to close off the zone that holds the Green Brigade for the following two matches.

In response to the murder of George Floyd, the Green Brigade supported the Black Lives Matter movement and changed a number of streets signs in Glasgow - renaming them after prominent black civil rights leaders and activists.

=== Solidarity with Palestine ===
On October 7, 2023, Celtic’s Green Brigade unfurled two huge banners declaring "Free Palestine" and "Victory to the Resistance". On 25 October 2023, thousands of Celtic fans, including members of the Green Brigade, flew the Palestinian flag and banners in support of Palestine during a UEFA Champions League group stage match against Atletico Madrid. Fans dedicated the song 'You'll Never Walk Alone' in solidarity with Palestinians in Gaza amidst the Gaza war which resulted in thousands of civilian deaths. On 31 October 2023, Celtic informed supporters by email that approximately 250 members of the Green Brigade would have their season tickets suspended after "serious issues" related to the Brigade's "unacceptable conduct". they have also flew banners of the Palestinian militant group Popular Front for the Liberation of Palestine.

On 23 December 2023, following a resolution with the Celtic board, the fan group returned to Celtic Park with another display of solidarity with Palestine, with banners quoting 'A Prisoner's Christmas Song', expressing sorrow over the tragic death toll of Israel's war in Gaza which had resulted in over 20,000 Palestinians killed, including 8,000 children, at the time of the match.

During a UEFA Champions League match against Bayern Munich in February 2025, fans raised a banner stating "Show 'Israel' the red card" to call for Israel to be banned from FIFA competitions. The protest inspired similar protests at other clubs throughout the world.

== Charity ==
=== Lajee Celtic ===
After the 2016 Champions League match and Palestinian flag display against Hapoel Be'er Sheva F.C., and the subsequent Match the Fine for Palestine movement, the £176,076 raised was split between Medical Aid for Palestinians and the Lajee Center, leading to the founding of the Aida Celtic Football Club in 2019. The club is managed by the Lajee Center and internationally supported by the Green Brigade. In 2022, the club partnered with Primal Scream to release their 'Palestinadelica' kits. In 2024, the club changed its name to Lajee Celtic. (Note: Lajee means 'refugee' in Palestinian.) The club has an elected board of 9 directors, and a general assembly of 50 members. The club also maintains international support, with the international hub based in Glasgow.

=== Other charitable acts ===
The Green Brigade have organized food bank collections. They have also organized benefit nights that benefit welfare and anti-racist charities in Glasgow. The Kano Foundation also takes youth groups to matches.

== Rivalries and friendships ==
=== Rivalries ===
The Green Brigade naturally share a rivalry with the Union Bears, the ultras of their Glasgow counterpart, Rangers.
