= Augusto Benedico =

Mexican actor

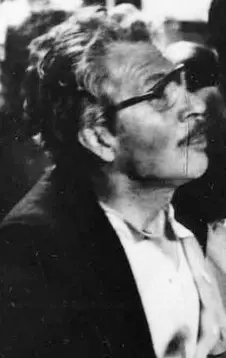
- Augusto Benedico in El ángel exterminador (1962)
- Born: Augusto Pérez Lías; December 20, 1909; Alicante, Spain
- Died: January 19, 1992 (aged 82); Mexico City, Mexico
- Occupation: Actor

Augusto Benedico (December 20, 1909 – January 19, 1992), born Augusto Pérez Lias, was a Mexican actor of Spanish origin best known for his role as "Don Alberto Salvatierra" in the soap opera Los ricos también lloran and his role as "Don Fernando" in the American educational television program Destinos: An Introduction to Spanish.

== Selected filmography ==
- La venenosa (1949) - El tigre
- Capitán de rurales (1951) - Doctor (uncredited)
- They Say I'm a Communist (1951) - Don Federico, jefe de Benito (uncredited)
- Doña Perfecta (1951) - Don Anselmo (uncredited)
- Aquellos ojos verdes (1952) - Guillermo (uncredited)
- Prisionera del recuerdo (1952) - Sr. Villalba
- Casa de muñecas (1954) - Agustín Arreola
- El gran autor (1954) - Don Sergio
- La rival (1955)
- After the Storm (1955)
- Historia de un amor (1956) - Especialista médico (uncredited)
- Con quién andan nuestras hijas (1956) - Padre de Beatriz
- La Ilegítima (1956) - Don Alfonso (uncredited)
- Esposas infieles (1956)
- Juventud desenfrenada (1956) - Jefe del Tribunal
- Tinieblas (1957) - Licenciado Gómez
- Concurso de belleza (1958)
- Ama a tu prójimo (1958) - Empresario
- El hombre que logró ser invisible (1958) - Luis / Lewis hall
- Sabrás que te quiero (1958) - Luis Mendoza
- Kermesse (1959) - Don Jose Gómez
- Siete pecados (1959) - Eduardo del Campo
- Manicomio (1959) - Dr. Gustavo Ortiz, señor director
- Nacida para amar (1959)
- La Fièvre Monte à El Pao (1959) - Le ministre Sáenz (uncredited)
- Yo pecador (1959) - Doctor
- La cigüeña dijo sí (1960)
- Mundo, demonio y carne (1960)
- The White Sister (1960) - Monseñor
- Dios sabrá juzgarnos (1961)
- Confidencias matrimoniales (1961)
- Espiritismo (1962) - Sacerdote
- Las recién casadas (1962) - Sacerdote
- The Exterminating Angel (1962) - Carlos Conde
- Los secretos del sexo débil (1962)
- Estos años violentos (1962) - Dr. Sáenz
- Cascabelito (1962)
- Santo vs. las Mujeres Vampiro (1962) - Prof. Orlof
- El cielo y la tierra (1962) - Doctor
- Santo contra el rey del crimen (1962) - Matias
- Santo en el hotel de la muerte (1963) - Matias
- Santo contra el cerebro diabolico (1963) - Asistente del Santo
- Mi vida es una canción (1963)
- Amor y sexo (1964) - Carlos
- Napoleoncito (1964) - Director del banco
- La mano que aprieta (1966) - Julio Arena (uncredited)
- Sólo para tí (1966) - Ricardo
- Pedro Páramo (1967) - Padre Rentería
- Las amiguitas de los ricos (1967) - Raimundo
- Le Rapace (1968) - Maitre Calvez
- Cuatro hombres marcados (1968)
- The Big Cube (1969) - Dr. Lorenz
- La puerta y la mujer del carnicero (1969) - Invitado (segment "La puerta")
- El último pistolero (1969)
- Remolino de pasiones (1970) - Alfonso Solorzano
- El pueblo del terror (1970) - Don Lucas Muñoz
- La hora desnuda (1971)
- El cielo y tu (1971) - Monseñor
- Yesenia (1971)
- Sin salida (1971) - Doctor
- Secreto de confesión (1971) - Don Ignacio Roldán
- The Garden of Aunt Isabel (1972)
- Nadie te querrá como yo (1972) - Anibal Carrasco
- El festin de la loba (1972) - Don Rubén
- Los Cachorros (1973) - Sr. Cuéllar
- El imponente (1973)
- El monasterio de los buitres (1973)
- Jalisco nunca pierde (1974) - Don Cenen Palomares
- Sandakot na bala (1988)
