= Muñeca (TV series) =

- Genre: Telenovela
- Created by: Original Story: Abel Santa Cruz; Luis Moreno
- Directed by: Fernando Wagner
- Starring: Fanny Cano; Rodolfo Bebán; Blanca Sánchez; Augusto Benedico; Susana Alexander; Andrea Palma
- Country of origin: Mexico
- Original language: Spanish

Production
- Executive producer: Manolo García

Original release
- Network: Canal 8
- Release: 1973 – 1973

Related
- La hiena

Muñeca (English: Doll), is a Mexican telenovela directed by Fernando Wagner and produced by Manolo García for Televisa in 1973, starring Fanny Cano and Rodolfo Bebán.

== Plot ==
Daniel, a well-behaved child, is bored by his empty life. He lives with his aunt Amanda and uncle Alejandro since he was orphaned. One day, Alejandro tells Daniel that the inheritance he received from his parents is an area developed into a valuable and bustling city.

In that city lives Muñeca, a cute young girl who spends most of her time studying, Rat, who recently got out of jail; and Tobacco Kid, one of Rat's friends. Daniel arrives in the neighborhood wearing his old clothes and meets Muñeca. She thinks that he is one of the city's residents and Daniel played along. Using the name of Ángel he moved to live in the city with the help of Julita his faithful servant. Little by little Muñeca and Daniel fall in love. A variety of complications make life difficult for Daniel, though. These include the truth of Daniel's identity coming out, Susana, a girl in love with Daniel, and uncle Alejandro whose true intentions are to stay in the land inherited by his nephew. Muñeca and Daniel will have to fight hard in order to be happy.

== Cast ==
- Fanny Cano† as Muñeca Rivas
- Rodolfo Bebán† as Daniel/Ángel
- Blanca Sánchez† as Laura
- Augusto Benedico† as Alejandro
- Andrea Palma† as Amanda
- Gustavo Rojo† as Padre Félix
- Alejandro Ciangherotti† as Anselmo
- Luis Miranda as El Rata
- Adalberto Martínez "Resortes"† as Sabino
- Virginia Manzano as María
- Susana Alexander as Márgara
- Manuel Rivera as José
- Guillermo Rivas "El Borras"† as Manzano
- Wolf Rubinsky† as Kid Tabaco
- Eduardo Pérez Rojas as Rodolfo
- Yolanda Liévana as Susana
- Alma Muriel† as Julita
- Enrique Álvarez Félix† as Mariano
