= Lucha Moreno =

Mexican singer and actress (1939–2026)

- Born: Irma Gloria Ochoa Salinas; 23 April 1939; Guadalupe, Nuevo León, Mexico
- Died: 15 April 2026 (aged 86); Mexico City, Mexico
- Occupations: Singer; actress
- Years active: 1957–2009
- Spouse: José Juan
- Children: 2, including Mimí

Irma Gloria Ochoa Salinas (23 April 1939 – 15 April 2026), known professionally as Lucha Moreno, was a Mexican singer and actress, whose specialty is the musical genre of ranchera.

== Career ==
Moreno debuted in films singing "La noche de mi mal" in Asesinos, S.A. (1957), starring Resortes and Kitty de Hoyos. She then starred in No soy monedita de oro (1959), with Fernando Casanova and Cuco Sánchez; El gato (1961), with Joaquín Cordero; Las hijas del Amapolo (1962), with José Elías Moreno and Carmela Rey; Aquí está tu enamorado (1963), with Antonio Aguilar, Flor Silvestre, and Manuel López Ochoa; Lupe Balazos (1964), with Julio Aldama; Escuela para solteras (1965), with an all-star cast; and Los dos apóstoles (1966), with Luis Aguilar. She also participated in telenovelas.

With her husband, singer José Juan, she formed the successful duet Lucha Moreno y José Juan, recording in the 1960s and 1970s. She was the mother of Flans member Mimi.

== Death ==
Moreno died on 15 April 2026, eight days before her 87th birthday.

== Discography ==
=== Singles ===
- «Anoche estuve llorando» (Columbia, 1957)
- «Vencida» (Columbia, 1957)

=== Studio albums ===
- Lucha Moreno (Orfeón 12-22, 1958)
- Acuarelas provincianas (Orfeón 12-38)
- Rancheras de siempre (Orfeón 12-52)
- Ecos de la revolución (Orfeón 12-103)
- Éxitos de Lucha Moreno (Orfeón 12-214)

== Filmography ==
Film

- Asesinos, S.A. (1957) as singer in the Club Torero
- Tirando a Matar (1961) as Marta
- Aquí está tu enamorado (1963) as Lucha
- El ciclón de Jalisco (1964) as Marta
- Lupe Balazos (1964) as Lupe Rivas

Television

- Quinceañera (1987) as Virginia Campos, two episodes
- Amor en silencio (1988) as Consuelo de Durán
