= La hiena =

Mexican telenovela

- Genre: Telenovela
- Created by: Caridad Bravo Adams
- Directed by: Ernesto Alonso
- Starring: Amparo Rivelles; Carlos Bracho; Ofelia Medina; Enrique Rocha; Nelly Meden; Gloria Marín; Tony Carbajal; Jorge Vargas
- Country of origin: Mexico
- Original language: Spanish

Production
- Executive producer: Ernesto Alonso

Original release
- Network: Canal 8
- Release: 1973 – 1974

Related
- Muñeca; El manantial del milagro

La hiena (English: The Hyena) is a Mexican telenovela directed and produced by Ernesto Alonso for Televisa in 1973. Starring Amparo Rivelles, Ofelia Medina, Carlos Bracho, Nelly Meden, Enrique Rocha, Gloria Marín and Tony Carbajal.

== Cast ==
- Amparo Rivelles† as Rita Hernández "La Hiena"; Protagonist/Main Villain (Killed by Marcial)
- Ofelia Medina as Isabel Solís
- Carlos Bracho as Emilio Martínez
- Tony Carbajal† as Abelardo Solís
- Gloria Marín† as Soledad Martínez
- Nelly Meden as Jacqueline Almedida
- Enrique Rocha† as Marcial García
- Atilio Marinelli as Raúl Carbajal
- Jorge Vargas† as Germán Rivas
- Natalia “Kiki” Herrera Calles as Helena Montero
- José Antonio Ferral† as Javier
- Oscar Morelli† as Capitán Pedro Montero
- Martha Zavaleta as Anabella
- Manuel Rivera as Lic. Camargo
- Alfonso Mejía as César
- Alberto Inzúa† as Lic. Fermín Mendoza
- July Furlong as Rosaura
- Héctor Flores as Tony
- Sergio Barrios as Capitán Bernard
- Socorro Avelar† as Socorro
- Leonor Llausás† as Sacra
- Sergio Jiménez† as Osmín
- Susana Dosamantes† as Dayanara
- Arsenio Campos as Roberto
- Milton Rodríguez as Guelson Dutra
- Juan Ángel Martínez as Sada
