= Union Bears =

Scottish football ultras group

- Abbreviation: UB07
- Established: 2007
- Type: Supporters' group
- Club: Rangers F.C.
- Motto: No Surrender
- Location: Glasgow, Scotland
- Stadium: Ibrox Stadium, 150 Edminson Drive, Glasgow, G51 2XD
- Stand: Copland Front, Section CF1
- Key people: Ross McGill
- Colours
- Website: www.ub07.co.uk

The Union Bears are an association football ultras group supporting Rangers F.C. in Glasgow, Scotland. Formed as a splinter group of the Blue Order in 2007, following the 2006 establishment of the rival Green Brigade, the Union Bears was established by members of the Blue Order seeking a European-inspired form of vocal ultras support, characterized by large tifo displays and pyrotechnics. Their motto "no surrender" was used by the Protestant city defenders during the 1689 siege of Derry as a defiant message to the Catholic forces of King James II, and is used widely by Protestant unionists and Rangers supporters.

== Controversies ==
The Union Bears are a controversial group, often singing anti-Celtic songs and chants considered by many to be sectarian. They take a far-right and anti-SNP stance in Scottish and British politics, with a strong ideological overlap with the Orange Order. The Union Bears strongly support 45th and 47th US President Donald Trump, displaying banners and tifos reading "Make Rangers Great Again" a rewording of Trump's campaign slogan "Make America Great Again".
