= No soy monedita de oro =

- Directed by: Chano Urueta
- Starring: Armando Arriola; Fernando Casanova; Daniel 'Chino' Herrera
- Release date: 26 March 1959
- Running time: 80 minutes
- Country: Mexico
- Language: Spanish

No soy monedita de oro ("I Am Not a Gold Coin") is a 1959 Mexican film. It was directed by Chano Urueta.

== Cast ==
- Armando Arriola
- Fernando Casanova
- Daniel 'Chino' Herrera
- Mary López
- Lucha Moreno
- Óscar Ortiz de Pinedo
- Cuco Sánchez
