= Asesinos, S.A. =

- Theatrical release poster
- Directed by: Adolfo Fernández Bustamante
- Screenplay by: Rafael Solana; Carlos León; Adolfo Fernández Bustamante
- Story by: Sidney T. Bruckner
- Produced by: Sidney T. Bruckner
- Starring: Adalberto Martínez "Resortes"; Kitty de Hoyos; Sara Guasch
- Cinematography: Jack Draper
- Music by: Luis Hernández Bretón
- Production company: Estudios Tepeyac
- Distributed by: Producciones Espada
- Release date: September 16, 1957 (Mexico)
- Running time: 95 minutes
- Country: Mexico
- Language: Spanish

Asesinos, S.A. (Murderers, Inc.) is a 1957 Mexican comedy film written and directed by Adolfo Fernández Bustamante, and starring Adalberto Martínez "Resortes", Kitty de Hoyos and Sara Guasch. This film features the film debut of the actress and singer Lucha Moreno, and the dancer, baterist and businesswoman Lisa Rossel.

== Cast ==
- Adalberto Martínez "Resortes" as Pancho Gómez / León Bravo (credited as "Resortes")
- Kitty de Hoyos as Julieta / Sofía
- Wolf Ruvinskis as Muñeco
- Luis Aldás as Vaneck
- Sara Guasch as La Suegra / La Jefa
- Guillermo Orea as Doctor del Río
- Francisco Muller as Doctor Flores
- Salvador Lozano as Headwaiter
- Arturo Castro as Police Official
- Roberto Y. Palacios as Chino
- Francisco Reiguera as Doctor del Campo
- Felipe de Flores as Vaneck's Secretary
- Héctor Mateos as Henchman
- René Barrera as Henchman
- Conchita Gentil Arcos as Gymnastics Professor (credited as Conchita G. Arcos)
- Magda Donato as Gymnast
- Lucha Moreno as Club Torero Singer (film debut)
- Lisa Rossel as Imaginary Dancer (film debut) (credited as Liza Rossell)
- Ricardo Adalid as Bowler (uncredited)
- Octavio Arias as Bowler (uncredited)
- Guillermo Hernández as Doctor Flores' Assistant (uncredited)

== Production ==
Filming began in December 1956 in Estudios Tepeyac.

== Premiere ==
The film premiered on September 16, 1957, in Cine Orfeón for two weeks.
