= Escuela para solteras =

- Directed by: Miguel Zacarías
- Written by: Alfredo Zacarías
- Produced by: Alfredo Zacarías
- Starring: Luis Aguilar; Antonio Aguilar; Amador Bendayán; Javier Solís; Sara García; Fanny Cano; Flor Silvestre; Lucha Moreno; Alma Delia Fuentes; Carmela Rey; José Alfredo Jiménez; Manuel López Ochoa
- Release date: 1965
- Country: Mexico
- Language: Spanish

Escuela para solteras ("School for Singles") is a 1965 Mexican music comedy film produced and written by Alfredo Zacarías, directed by Miguel Zacarías and starring Luis Aguilar, Antonio Aguilar, Amador Bendayán, Javier Solís, Sara García, Fanny Cano, Flor Silvestre, Lucha Moreno, Alma Delia Fuentes, Carmela Rey, José Alfredo Jiménez and Manuel López Ochoa. This is the only of the films in which Silvestre plays a double role.

== Plot ==
Amador is in love with Estrella as she is with him and they both want to get married, but she is the granddaughter of Doña Bernarda who will not allow the marriage to take place before her other granddaughters marry respectively. Amador will start looking for a husband for each one of them in order to be able to finalize his union with Estrella.

== Cast ==
- Luis Aguilar as Luis Álvarez
- Antonio Aguilar as Antonio Contreras
- Amador Bendayan as Amador
- Javier Solís as El médico (The doctor)
- Sara García as Doña Bernarda
- Fanny Cano as Estrella
- Óscar Ortiz de Pinedo as Don Filemón (Mr. Filemon)
- Flor Silvestre as Elisa/Felisa
- Lucha Moreno as Lucha
- Alma Delia Fuentes as Julieta
- Carmela Rey as Lucero
- José Alfredo Jiménez as El desesperado (The desperate)
- Manuel López Ochoa as El ingeniero (The engineer)
