= Las hijas del Amapolo =

- Directed by: Gilberto Martínez Solares
- Starring: Lucha Moreno, María Eugenia Rubio, Carmela Rey, Angelica Maria, Sara García
- Release date: 1962
- Running time: 96 minute
- Country: Mexico
- Language: Spanish

Las hijas del Amapolo ("The Daughters of Amapolo") is a 1962 Mexican family and musical comedy film directed by Gilberto Martínez Solares and starring Lucha Moreno, María Eugenia Rubio, Carmela Rey, Angelica Maria and Sara García. This movie includes a dozen great musical numbers.

== Premise ==
Four brothers arrive in a Mexican village in time for the annual town festival. They are instantly enamored with four sisters. But they will need to contend with their father (known notoriously as "el Amapolo"), as well as to compete with other men in town for their attention. Their grandmother adds an interesting twist to the festivities.

== Cast ==
- Jose Elias Moreno -----as Felipe de las Casas-----alone, tall & red
- Sara García -----as grandma (abuela)----- la Coronela (la Generala)

Felipe's daughters:

- Lucha Moreno -----as Licha de las Casas-----tallest
- María Eugenia Rubio -----as Rosa de las Casas-----stutters
- Carmela Rey -----as Luz de las Casas-----charro outfit
- Angelica Maria -----as Colo de las Casas-----recites poetry

Serrano brothers, in the same order as the daughter each wants to marry:

- Jose Juan Hernandez -----as Pepe Serrano-----wide band on hat
- Eduardo Silvestre -----as David Serrano-----Mr Universo
- Paco Michel -----as Luis Serrano-----white shirt black pants
- Rene Cardona Jr. -----as Julio Serrano-----dark shirt, thin stripes

Others:

- José Alfredo Jiménez -----as bar singer-----sings title song
- Amparo Arozamena -----as Lolita-----bar owner (Lola)
- Sergio Llanes -----as Tijeras-----main antagonist
- Alberto Marcos -----as el cura-----priest
- Arturo Siliceo Castillo -----as el nino-----boy
- Jorge Casanova -----as jailer
- Eduardo Zamarripa -----as Registro Civil
- Armando Gordo Acosta -----as barbell trickster
