= Los dos apóstoles =

- Starring: Luis Aguilar, Fernando Casanova, Lucha Moreno, Dacia González, Sara García
- Release date: 1966
- Country: Mexico
- Language: Spanish

Los dos apóstoles ("The Two Apostles") is a 1966 Mexican comedy film starring Luis Aguilar, Fernando Casanova, Lucha Moreno, Dacia González and Sara García.

== Cast ==
as per credits order

- Luis Aguilar as Juan Heredia
- Fernando Casanova as Pedro Heredia
- Lucha Moreno
- Dacia González
- Sara García as Doña Angustias
- Andrés Soler as Don Serapio
- Armando Soto La Marina as 'Chicote'
- Miguel Arenas
- José Eduardo Pérez
- Lucha Palacios
- Héctor Suárez as the Padre
