= Vazquez Hermanos Circus =

Mexican circus

Circo Hermanos Vazquez
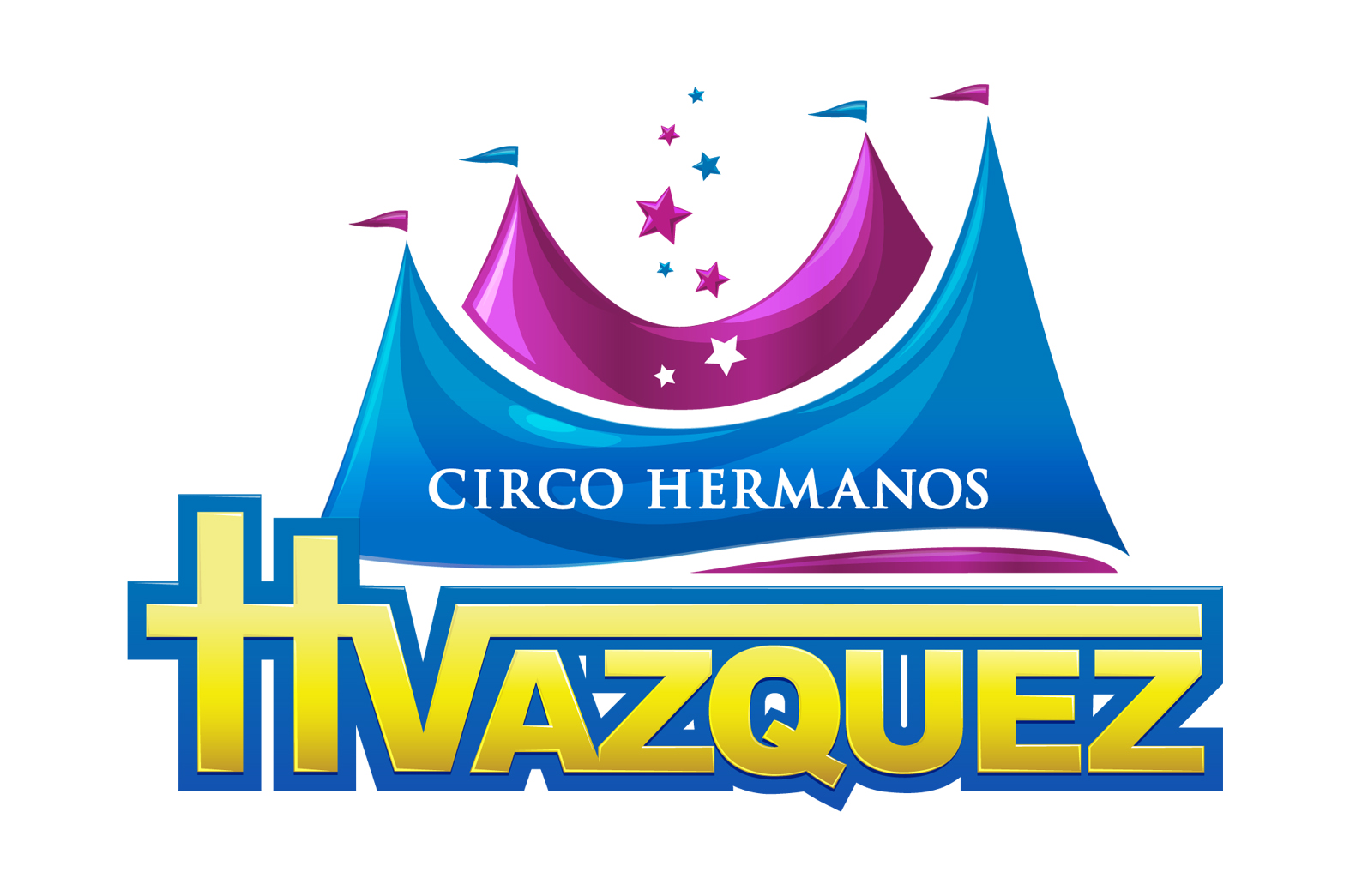
- 2019 logo
- Company type: Private company
- Industry: Entertainment
- Founded: 1969; 57 years ago
- Founders: Jose Guillermo; Rafael Vázquez; Aurora Vázquez; Antonia De Vazquez
- Headquarters: 700 Vazquez LN, Donna, TX
- Key people: Guillermo Jr. Vazquez; Jose Vázquz; Jesus Vazquez; Ramon Vazquez; Aldo Vazquez
- Website: circovazquez.com

Circo Hermanos Vazquez is a Mexican circus established in 1969. The modern circus is American.

== History ==
The Circus Hermanos Vazquez started in the year 1969, during a period of cultural and social change in Mexico. Run by the brothers Jose Guillermo and Rafael Vazquez, the circus opened for the first time in Mexico City. Other participants were Aurora Vázquez and Antonia De Vazquez y José G. Vázquez.

The modern Circo Hermanos Vazquez is established in the United States, and is directed by Guillermo Jr, Jose, Jesus, Ramon, and Aldo Vazquez.

== Gallery ==
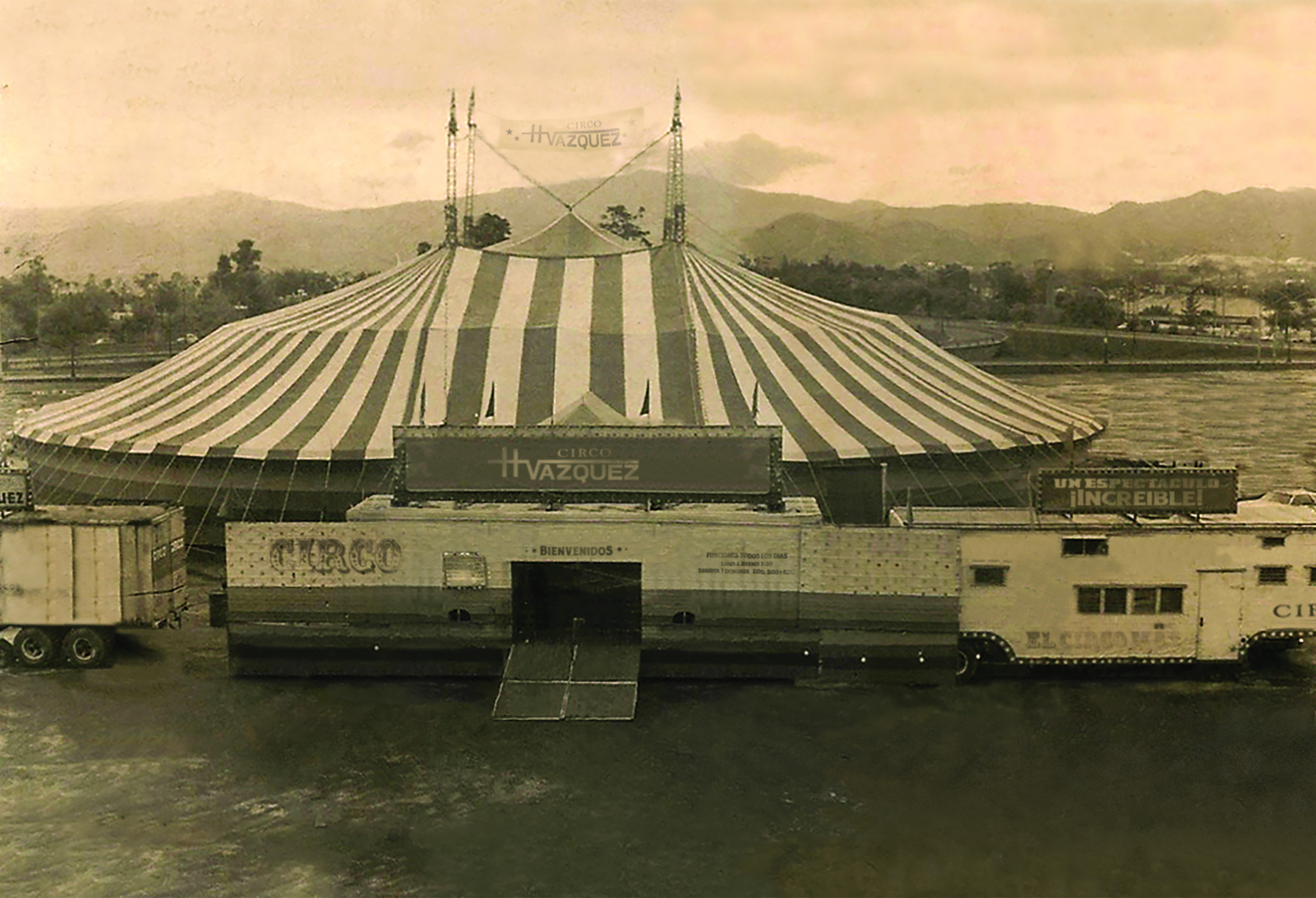
1969, Mexico City

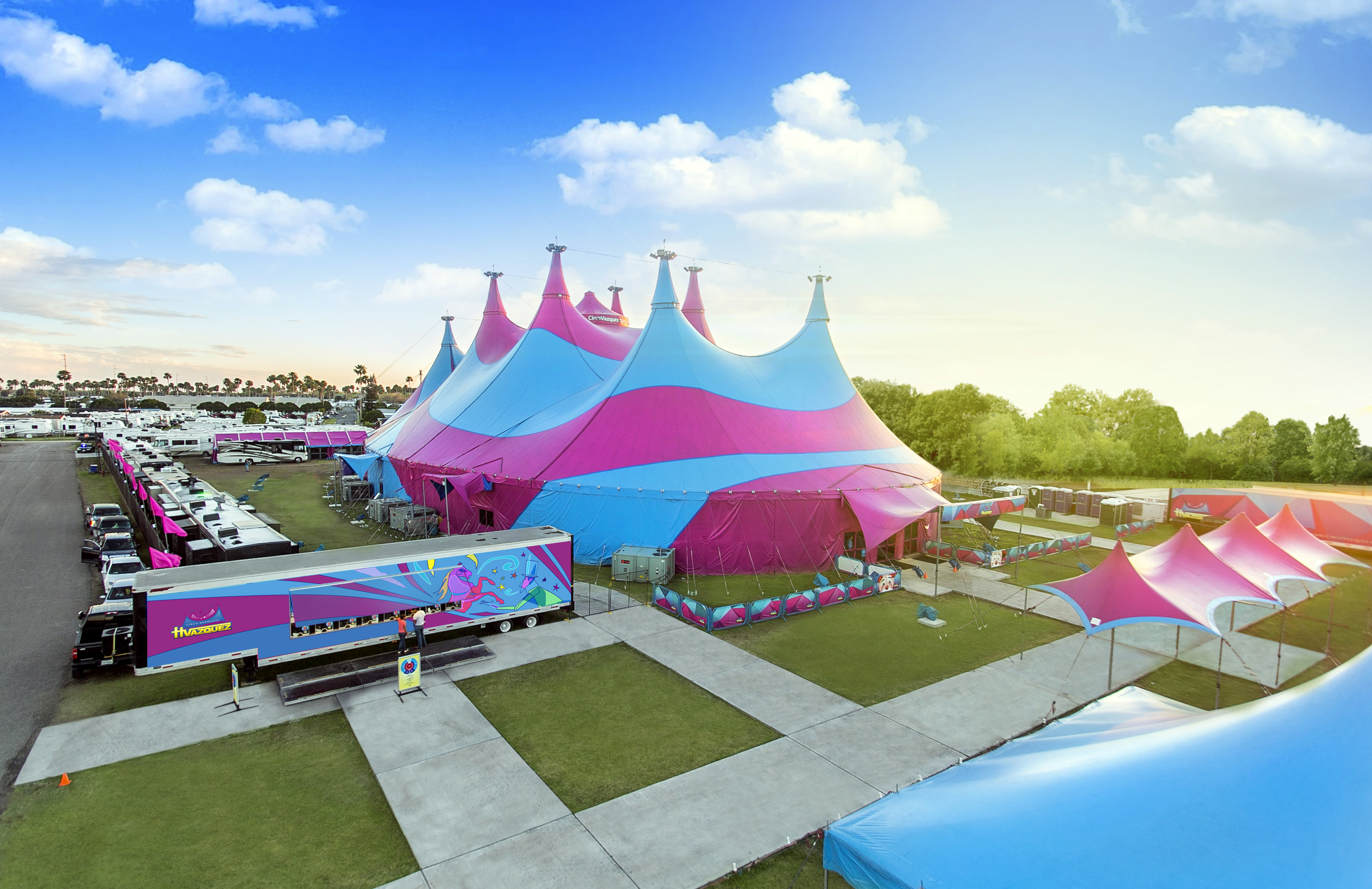
2019 tent

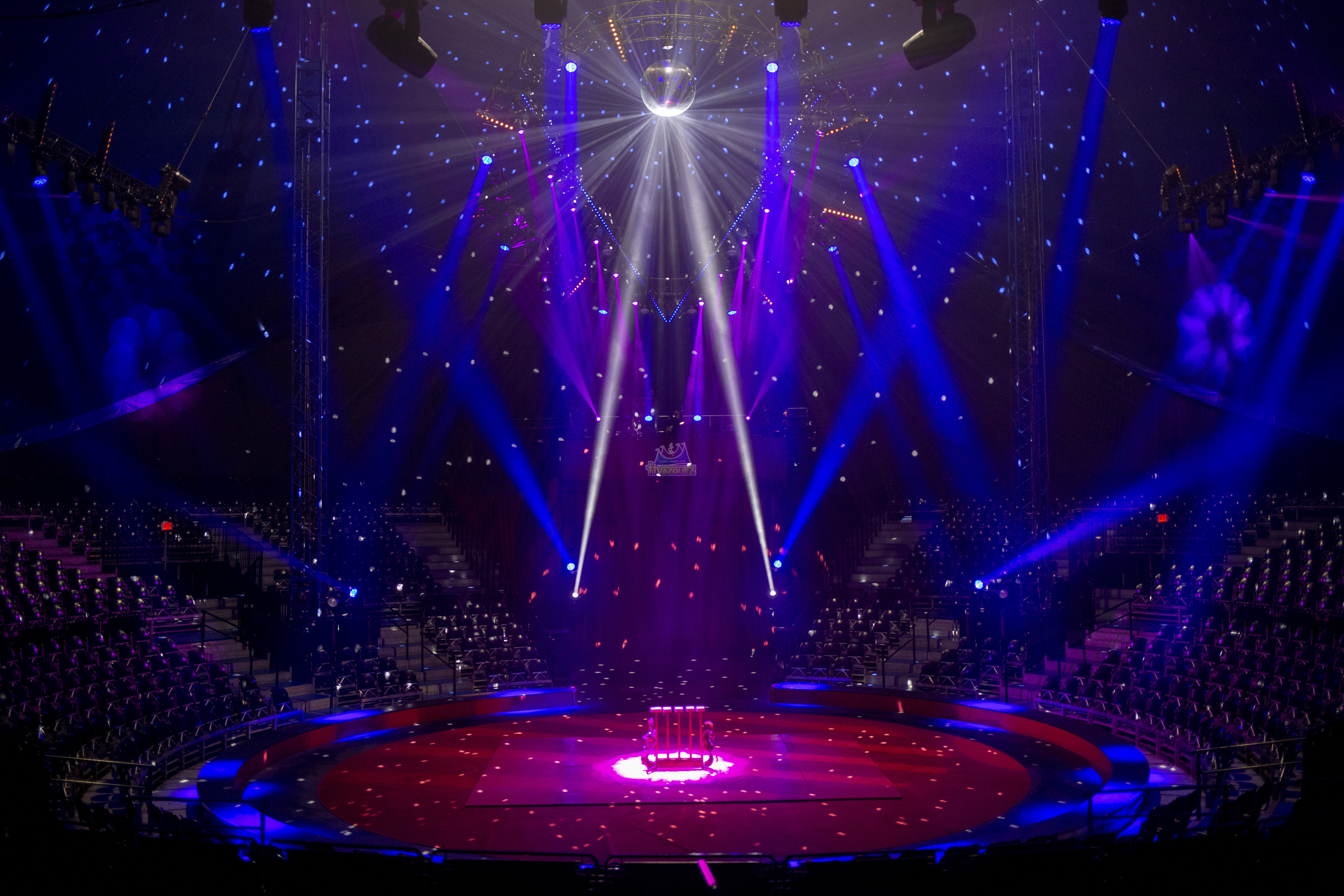
Interior, circus tent 2019

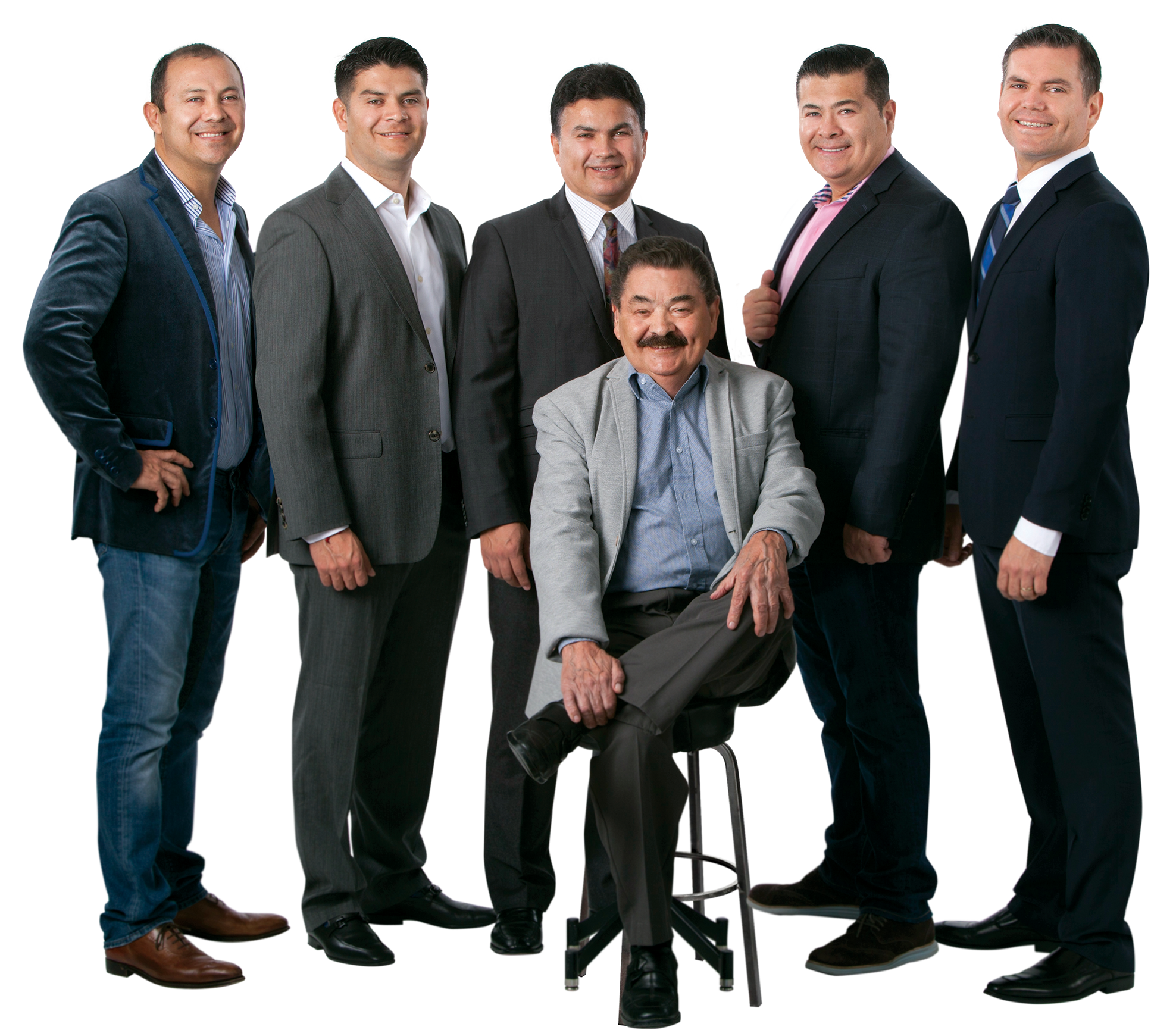
The Vazquez 2019
