= List of acts of the Scottish Parliament from 2018 =

This is a list of acts of the Scottish Parliament passed in 2018. Acts of the Scottish Parliament are enacted by the Scottish Parliament, which has legislative authority over devolved matters in relation to Scotland under the authority of the Scotland Act 1998. Acts are cited by calendar year, in the same fashion as acts of Parliament of the United Kingdom. Each act passed in a respective year is numbered consecutively with Arabic numerals, following the prefix "asp".

15 acts of the Scottish Parliament were passed in 2018.

indicates that an act has been transcribed on Wikisource, indicates that an act is available to view at legislation.gov.uk, and indicates the location of the original act in the Parliamentary Archives.

== Acts of the Scottish Parliament ==
Short title	Citation	Royal assent
Long title
Edinburgh Bakers' Widows' Fund Act 2018	2018 asp 1	12 January 2018
An Act of the Scottish Parliament to allow the Trustees of the Widows' Scheme of the Incorporation of Bakers of the City of Edinburgh to make capital payments to certain persons who might otherwise have been entitled to annuity payments from the Widows' Fund for the Incorporation of Bakers within the City of Edinburgh; to transfer the remaining property, rights, interests and liabilities of the Widows' Fund to a successor charitable trust; to dissolve the Widows' Fund; and for connected purposes.
Writers to the Signet Dependants' Annuity Fund Amendment (Scotland) Act 2018	2018 asp 2	18 January 2018
An Act of the Scottish Parliament to amend the Writers to the Signet Dependants' Annuity Fund Order Confirmation Act 1982 (Note: Writers to the Signet Dependants' Annuity Fund Order Confirmation Act 1982 (c. xxiv)) to amend the definition of "actuary" and to amend the description of persons who may be elected collector of the Fund.
Wild Animals in Travelling Circuses (Scotland) Act 2018	2018 asp 3	24 January 2018
An Act of the Scottish Parliament to make it an offence to use wild animals in travelling circuses.
Gender Representation on Public Boards (Scotland) Act 2018	2018 asp 4	9 March 2018
An Act of the Scottish Parliament to make provision about gender representation on boards of Scottish public authorities.
Domestic Abuse (Scotland) Act 2018	2018 asp 5	9 March 2018
An Act of the Scottish Parliament to create an offence with respect to the engaging by a person in a course of behaviour which is abusive of the person's partner or ex-partner; and to make rules of criminal procedure for that offence and also for offences subject to the statutory aggravation involving abuse of partners or ex-partners.
Budget (Scotland) Act 2018	2018 asp 6	28 March 2018
An Act of the Scottish Parliament to make provision, for financial year 2018/19, for the use of resources by the Scottish Administration and certain bodies whose expenditure is payable out of the Scottish Consolidated Fund, for the maximum amounts of borrowing by certain statutory bodies and for authorising the payment of sums out of the Fund; to make provision, for financial year 2019/20, for authorising the payment of sums out of the Fund on a temporary basis; and for connected purposes.
Offensive Behaviour at Football and Threatening Communications (Repeal) (Scotland) Act 2018	2018 asp 7	19 April 2018
An Act of the Scottish Parliament to repeal the Offensive Behaviour at Football and Threatening Communications (Scotland) Act 2012; (Note: Offensive Behaviour at Football and Threatening Communications (Scotland) Act 2012 (asp 1)) and for connected purposes.
Forestry and Land Management (Scotland) Act 2018	2018 asp 8	1 May 2018
An Act of the Scottish Parliament to make provision about Scottish Ministers' functions in relation to forestry; to make provision about Scottish Ministers' functions in relation to the management of forested land and other land; and for connected purposes.
Social Security (Scotland) Act 2018	2018 asp 9	1 June 2018
An Act of the Scottish Parliament making provision about social security.
Civil Litigation (Expenses and Group Proceedings) (Scotland) Act 2018	2018 asp 10	5 June 2018
An Act of the Scottish Parliament to make provision about success fee agreements; to make provision about expenses in civil litigation; to make provision about the offices of the Auditor of the Court of Session, the auditor of the Sheriff Appeal Court and the auditor of the sheriff court; and to make provision about the bringing of civil proceedings on behalf of a group of persons.
Land and Buildings Transaction Tax (Relief from Additional Amount) (Scotland) Act 2018	2018 asp 11	22 June 2018
An Act of the Scottish Parliament to give retrospective effect to the amendments made by the Land and Buildings Transaction Tax (Additional Amount-Second Homes Main Residence Relief) (Scotland) Order 2017. (Note: Land and Buildings Transaction Tax (Additional Amount-Second Homes Main Residence Relief) (Scotland) Order 2017 (SSI 2017/233))
Islands (Scotland) Act 2018	2018 asp 12	6 July 2018
An Act of the Scottish Parliament to make provision for a national islands plan; to impose duties in relation to island communities on certain public authorities; to make provision about the electoral representation of island communities; and to establish a licensing scheme in respect of marine development adjacent to islands.
Housing (Amendment) (Scotland) Act 2018	2018 asp 13	6 July 2018
An Act of the Scottish Parliament to amend the law on the regulation of social landlords and to reduce the influence of local authorities over registered social landlords.
Historical Sexual Offences (Pardons and Disregards) (Scotland) Act 2018	2018 asp 14	11 July 2018
An Act of the Scottish Parliament to pardon persons convicted of certain historical sexual offences and to provide a process for convictions for those offences to be disregarded.
Prescription (Scotland) Act 2018	2018 asp 15	18 December 2018
An Act of the Scottish Parliament to amend the law relating to the extinction of rights and obligations by the passage of time.

Additionally, the UK Withdrawal from the European Union (Legal Continuity) (Scotland) Bill was passed by the Scottish Parliament on 21 March 2018 but was referred to, and struck down by, the Supreme Court due to the passing of the European Union (Withdrawal) Act 2018 (c. 16), which legislated on many of the same matters and included itself on the list of protected laws that the Scottish Parliament cannot legislate on.

== See also ==
- List of acts of the Scottish Parliament
