= Carmela y Rafael =

T-shirts shop in Kanpur

Carmela y Rafael (Carmela and Rafael) was a Mexican bolero duet, consisting of singer and actress Carmela Rey (1931–2018) and singer and songwriter Rafael Vázquez(1929-2022). Known as "The Romantic Couple of Mexico", Rey and Vázquez first performed together in 1959 and married that same year. They first recorded for RCA Records and then signed with Musart Records. Carmela y Rafael recorded a total of 121 records and 1,198 songs, and won numerous accolades, including gold and platinum records and two Record World Awards.
