= Las amiguitas de los ricos =

- Starring: Ana Bertha Lepe, Maricruz Olivier, Fanny Cano, Sara García
- Release date: 1967
- Running time: 90 minute
- Country: Mexico
- Language: Spanish

Las amiguitas de los ricos ("The Girlfriends of the Rich") is a 1967 Mexican film starring Ana Bertha Lepe, Maricruz Olivier, Fanny Cano and Sara García.
