= Rafael Vázquez =

Mexican singer, songwriter, and actor (1929–2022)

Rafael Vázquez (26 March 1929 – 22 July 2022) was a Mexican singer, songwriter, and actor. Born in Tampico, Tamaulipas, he studied voice with singing teacher Carlos Abreu before achieving success as a singer at Mexico City radio station XEW in 1950. In 1959, he married Mexican singer and actress Carmela Rey, with whom he formed the successful duet Carmela y Rafael, known as "Mexico's Romantic Couple"; together they made 121 records and won numerous awards. He made his acting debut in the film Ruletero a toda marcha (1962), with Eulalio González, María Duval, and Norma Angélica Ladrón de Guevara. Vázquez died on 22 July 2022, at the age of 93.
