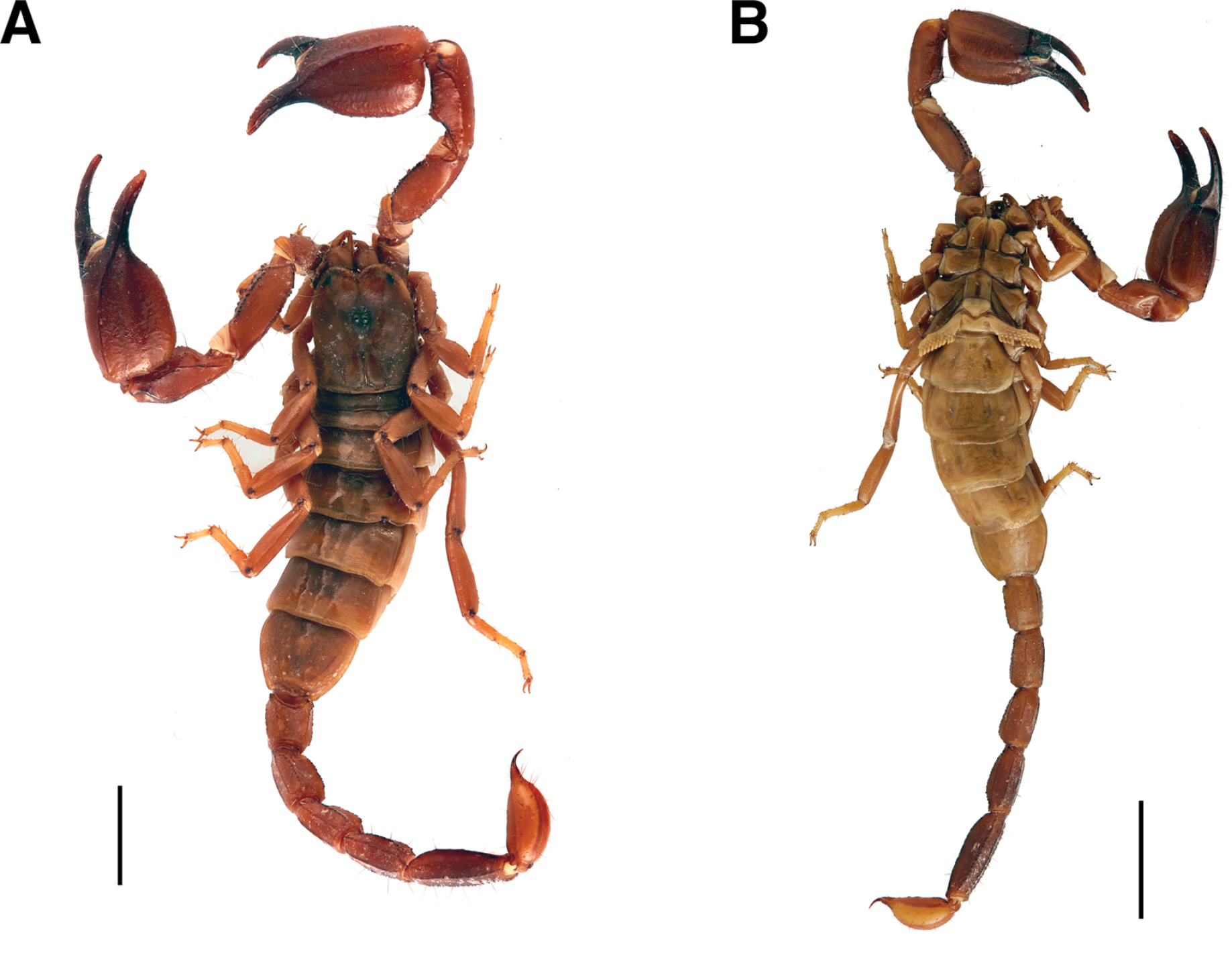
- Hemiscorpius maindroni

Scientific classification
- Domain: Eukaryota
- Kingdom: Animalia
- Phylum: Arthropoda
- Subphylum: Chelicerata
- Class: Arachnida
- Order: Scorpiones
- Family: Hemiscorpiidae; Pocock, 1893
- Genus: Hemiscorpius; Peters, 1861

Synonyms
- Ischnuridae; Liochelidae

= Hemiscorpius =

Family of scorpions

Hemiscorpius is the sole genus of the scorpion family Hemiscorpiidae, with about 16 described species. Before Hemiscorpiidae, the term used for the family was Ischnuridae, which had to be changed due to a naming conflict with the damselfly family of the same name. They at one point also held the name Liochelidae.

In 2015, research on the evolution, biogeography and phylogeny of the families Hormuridae, Hemiscorpiidae, and Heteroscorpionidae left Hemiscorpiidae with a single genus, Hemiscorpius, the remaining 15 merged or transferred to other families.

== Description ==
Most species of Hemiscorpius have a very flat and broad body plan, due to their main habitat in tight rock crevices.

== Distribution ==
Hemiscorpius is distributed throughout the Middle East and Indomalaya.

== Human interaction ==
Hemiscorpius has a strong venom; especially that of Hemiscorpius lepturus can result in deadly accidents.

== Species ==
These 17 species belong to the genus Hemiscorpius:

- Hemiscorpius acanthocercus Monod & Lourenço, 2005
- Hemiscorpius arabicus Pocock, 1899
- Hemiscorpius egyptiensis Lourenço, 2011
- Hemiscorpius enischnochela Monod & Lourenço, 2005
- Hemiscorpius falcifer Lowe, 2010
- Hemiscorpius flagelliraptor Loewe, 2010
- Hemiscorpius gaillardi (Vachon, 1974)
- Hemiscorpius hierichonticus Simon, 1872
- Hemiscorpius kashkayi Karatas & Gharkheloo, 2013
- Hemiscorpius lepturus Peters, 1861
- Hemiscorpius maindroni Kraepelin, 1900
- Hemiscorpius novaki Kovarik & Mazuch, 2011
- Hemiscorpius persicus Birula, 1903
- Hemiscorpius shahii Kovarík & Navidpour, 2017
- Hemiscorpius socotranus Pocock, 1899
- Hemiscorpius somalicus Lourenço, 2011
- Hemiscorpius tellinii Borelli, 1904
