= Zoo Licensing Act 1981 =

Act of the Parliament of the United Kingdom

Zoo Licensing Act 1981 (Note: Section 23(1).)
- Act of Parliament
- Parliament of the United Kingdom
- Long title: An Act to regulate by licence the conduct of zoos.
- Citation: 1981 c. 37
- Territorial extent: England and Wales; Scotland; (Note: Section 23(3).)

Dates
- Royal assent: 27 July 1981
- Commencement: 30 April 1984 (Note: Section 23(2). The Zoo Licensing Act 1981 (Commencement) Order 1984 (SI 1984/423).)
Other legislation
Amended by	Wildlife and Countryside Act 1981; Local Government Act 1985; Planning (Consequential Provisions) Act 1990; Local Government (Wales) Act 1994; Local Government etc. (Scotland) Act 1994; Planning (Consequential Provisions) (Scotland) Act 1997; Zoo Licensing Act 1981 (Amendment) (England and Wales) Regulations 2002; Zoo Licensing Act 1981 Amendment (Scotland) Regulations 2003; Zoo Licensing Act 1981 (Amendment) (Wales) Regulations 2003; Statute Law (Repeals) Act 2004; Regulatory Reform (Fire Safety) Order 2005; Animal Welfare Act 2006; Fire (Scotland) Act 2005 (Consequential Modifications and Savings) Order 2006; Electronic Communications (Scotland) Order 2006; Animal Health and Welfare (Scotland) Act 2006 (Consequential Provisions) Order 2006; Police and Fire Reform (Scotland) Act 2012; Animal Welfare (Breeding of Dogs) (Wales) Regulations 2014; Animal Welfare (Licensing of Activities Involving Animals) (England) Regulations 2018; Wild Animals and Circuses (Wales) Act 2020

Status: Amended

Text of statute as originally enacted

Revised text of statute as amended

Text of the Zoo Licensing Act 1981 as in force today (including any amendments) within the United Kingdom, from legislation.gov.uk.

The Zoo Licensing Act 1981 (c. 37) is an act of the Parliament of the United Kingdom.

== Provisions ==
The main effect of the act was to regulate zoos by requiring them to be licensed by local authorities. The act did not extend to circuses or pet shops.

Individuals can apply for licences under the act if they have not committed any animal welfare offences. The act defines a zoo as an establishment where non-native animals are kept for exhibition to the public, for seven or more days per year, even if there is no charge.

== Bibliography ==
- Whitaker's Almanack: for the year 1982, complete edition, p. 361. J. Whitaker & Sons, London, 1981
