= Wild Animals in Travelling Circuses (Scotland) Act 2018 =

Wild Animals and Circuses (Scotland) Act 2020
- Act of the Scottish Parliament
- Scottish Parliament
- Long title: An Act of the Scottish Parliament to make it an offence to use wild animals in travelling circuses.
- Citation: 2018 asp 3
- Introduced by: Roseanna Cunningham MSP
- Territorial extent: Scotland

Dates
- Royal assent: 24 January 2018
- Commencement: 24 January 2018 (s 10); 28 May 2018 (ss 1, 2)

Status: Current legislation

History of passage through the Parliament

Text of statute as originally enacted

Text of the Wild Animals in Travelling Circuses (Scotland) Act 2018 as in force today (including any amendments) within the United Kingdom, from legislation.gov.uk.

The Wild Animals and Circuses (Scotland) Act 2020 (asp 3) is an act of the Scottish Parliament, which bans circuses from using wild animals.

== Background ==
Wild animals had been a feature of travelling circuses in the United Kingdom since the birth of the modern circus. Wild animals were hunted and captured in the colonies on an increasing scale in the second half of the nineteenth century with high mortality rates for the animals Some researchers have concluded that the species of non-domesticated animals commonly kept in circuses appear the least suited to a circus life on a wide variety of metrics.

From 2006, the RSPCA had been campaigning for circus animals to be banned, since the passage of the Animal Welfare Act 2006, which did not explicitly banning wild animals from being used in circuses instead leaving this to regulations through secondary legislation that was not laid before Parliament before the 2010 general election.

There had been no travelling circuses based in Scotland for many years.

Originally, MSPs raised concerns with the bill, including a lack of definitions, but it was voted through to the next stage. The amended bill was passed unanimously. The Scottish Parliament was the first legislature of the UK to ban the use of wild animals in circus performances.

== Provisions ==
The provisions of the act include:

- Prohibiting the use of wild animals in travelling circuses in Scotland. Breaching this law was made an offence punishable with a fine.
- Making provision for inspections of circuses to ensure compliance.

The act defines "wild animals" as those which are not normally found in the British Islands.

== Reception ==
In response to the bill, Martin Burton of the Association of Circus Proprietors, told MSPs that a law based on the proposed ethical grounds "will eventually close your zoos".

== See also ==
- Animal acts in circuses
- Wild Animals and Circuses (Wales) Act 2020
- Wild Animals in Circuses Act 2019
