= Immediate Delivery =

1963 film by Miguel M. Delgado

- Directed by: Miguel M. Delgado
- Screenplay by: Miguel M. Delgado (writer); Carlos León (additional dialogue); Jaime Salvador (adaptation and screenplay)
- Produced by: Jacques Gelman
- Starring: Mario Moreno «Cantinflas» Gina Romand; Fanny Cano
- Cinematography: Gabriel Figueroa
- Edited by: Jorge Bustos
- Music by: Gustavo César Carrión
- Production company: Posa Films
- Distributed by: Columbia Pictures
- Release date: 25 December 1963 (Mexico)
- Running time: 110 minutes
- Country: Mexico
- Language: Spanish

Immediate Delivery (Spanish: Entrega inmediata), originally known as Agente XU 777 (English: Agent XU 777) is a 1963 Mexican spy comedy film directed by Miguel M. Delgado and starring Mario Moreno «Cantinflas», Gina Romand and Fanny Cano. In the film, Cantinflas plays a simple mailman forced to become an international spy. It was the last black and white film made by Cantinflas, although he had already made six color films at the time.

== Plot ==
Feliciano (Cantinflas) is a mailman who is recruited by a secret counterintelligence service (which codenames him Agent XU-777), and must discover an international conspiracy.

He manages to find out that enemy agents, led by Carlota (Gina Romand) and Alex (Claudio Brook), will smuggle a teacher to decipher keys through a coffin. Feliciano is put in charge of the funeral home, but he ends up delivering the coffin to a wrong person, distracting the loyal agents and allowing the enemy to achieve their goal. However, the enemy agents discover that for the deciphering process they also must obtain a specific code.

In a parallel storyline, Feliciano learns that an old compadre of his arranged for his daughter to go live with Feliciano after his death. Due to a letter from his compadre where he describes his daughter as his "bebé" ("baby"), Feliciano assumes that his compadre’s daughter is an infant, even buying a crib and milk for the impending arrival. However, much to his surprise, he ends up discovering that his compadre’s daughter is actually a young woman nicknamed "Bebé" (Fanny Cano), and they end developing a romantic relationship. The enemy agents then kidnap Bebé to force Feliciano to betray his homeland and give the code to the enemy.

== Cast ==
- Mario Moreno «Cantinflas» as Feliciano / Agent XU 777
- Gina Romand as Carlota
- Claudio Brook as Alex
- Fanny Cano as Bebé
- Guillermo Zetina as Head of Counterintelligence
- María Amelia Ramírez as Agent 30-30 (as María Amelia Ramírez "Miss Argentina")
- Emma Roldán as Doña Angustias
- Quintín Bulnes as Agent
- María Herrero
- André Toffel
- Maricarmen Vela as Mercedes
- Xavier Massé
- Guillermo Rivas as Spy (as Guillermo Rivas "El Borras")
- Jorge Russek as Spy
- Armando Gutiérrez
- José Wilhelmy
- Adolfo Aguilar
- Alberto Catalá as Professor
- Ángel Merino
- Jorge Mondragón as Funeral Home Client
- Manuel Zozaya
- Francisco Reiguera as Odilón Campos Santos
- Ramón Valdés as Original Agent XU 777
- Julián de Meriche as Waiter (as Julién de Meriche)
- Rafael de Córdoba as Dancer
- Carlos León as Agent
- Hermanos Fernández

== Bibliography ==
- Agrasánchez, Rogelio. Beauties of Mexican Cinema. Agrasanchez Film Archive, 2001.
- Pilcher, Jeffrey M. Cantinflas and the Chaos of Mexican Modernity. Rowman & Littlefield, 2001.
