= Offensive Behaviour at Football and Threatening Communications (Scotland) Act 2012 =

Act of the Scottish Parliament

- Act of the Scottish Parliament
- Scottish Parliament
- Long title: An Act of the Scottish Parliament to create offences concerning offensive behaviour in relation to certain football matches, and concerning the communication of certain threatening material.
- Citation: 2012 asp 1
- Introduced by: Kenny MacAskill
- Territorial extent: Scotland

Dates
- Royal assent: 19 January 2012
- Repealed: 19 April 2018

Other legislation
- Repealed by: Offensive Behaviour at Football and Threatening Communications (Repeal) (Scotland) Act 2018

Status: Repealed

History of passage through the Parliament

Text of statute as originally enacted

The Offensive Behaviour at Football and Threatening Communications (Scotland) Act 2012 (asp 1) was an act of the Scottish Parliament which created new criminal offences concerning sectarian behaviour at football games. The act was repealed on 20 April 2018.

The legislation was introduced by the governing Scottish National Party and passed by MSPs by 64 votes to 57 without any opposition support. Labour, the Conservatives, the Liberal Democrats and the Scottish Greens said the bill was "railroaded" through by the SNP. The Scottish Government faced calls for an early review into how the legislation operated.

== Support and opposition ==
Opponents argue that the Offensive Behaviour Act compromises the principle of free speech. In June 2013, The Herald described it as "knee-jerk legislation" which needed to be revisited, arguing that "Scotland cannot arrest its way out of sectarianism".

In December 2014, MSPs met with representatives from Fans Against Criminalisation (FAC), an organisation that campaigns against the Offensive Behaviour Act. The meeting came after an incident where a football fan wearing a "Free Palestine" T-shirt was questioned by police at Tynecastle. Defending the legislation, SNP MSP John Mason told FAC he believes fans wearing "Yes" badges at football matches should also be susceptible to police action. Fans groups have also raised concerns about the law.

At their annual conference in 2014, the Scottish Socialist Party backed calls for the Offensive Behaviour Act to be repealed immediately.

=== Opinion polls ===
Opinion polling conducted by Panelbase and YouGov consistently suggests that a clear majority of Scottish voters support the act and its provisions. In May 2015, 60% of all respondents said they supported the act – including 59% of self-identified "Rangers fans" and 64% of self-identified "Celtic fans" – with only 14% wanting it to be abolished. Both polls were criticized by Fans Against Criminalisation.

== Effects ==
Singing "sectarian songs"—such as Irish rebel songs, or anti-Catholic songs such as No Pope of Rome—was prohibited, although what counted as a sectarian song was left to the judgement of police.

268 charges were made in the year after the law was passed, 99% of them male and 73.5% under the age of 30. In 27.6% of cases, someone under the influence of alcohol was involved. Charges were reported in all of Scotland's 32 regional councils, but 42.2% were in Glasgow. 87 convictions were made in the first thirteen months.

== Repeal ==
Labour MSP James Kelly introduced the Offensive Behaviour at Football and Threatening Communications (Repeal) (Scotland) Bill on 21 June 2017. Kelly had described the 2012 legislation as having "completely failed to tackle sectarianism" and as "illiberal" which "unfairly targets football fans", and was "condemned by legal experts, human rights organisations and equality groups". Professor Sir Tom Devine previously spoke of the Football Act as "the most illiberal and counterproductive act passed by our young Parliament to date" and a "stain on the reputation of the Scottish legal system for fair dealing". Much was made of when a sheriff described the law as "mince".

Offensive Behaviour at Football and Threatening Communications (Repeal) (Scotland) Act 2018
- Act of the Scottish Parliament
- Scottish Parliament
- Long title: An Act of the Scottish Parliament to repeal the Offensive Behaviour at Football and Threatening Communications (Scotland) Act 2012; and for connected purposes.
- Citation: 2018 asp 7

Dates
- Royal assent: 19 April 2018

Other legislation
- Repeals/revokes: Offensive Behaviour at Football and Threatening Communications (Scotland) Act 2012

Status: Current legislation

Text of statute as originally enacted

Text of the Offensive Behaviour at Football and Threatening Communications (Repeal) (Scotland) Act 2018 as in force today (including any amendments) within the United Kingdom, from legislation.gov.uk.

After passing Stage 1 on 25 January 2018, Stage 2 on 27 February and Stage 3 on 15 March, the bill received royal assent on 19 April as the Offensive Behaviour at Football and Threatening Communications (Repeal) (Scotland) Act 2018 (asp 7), repealing the 2012 act.

Following violent incidents during and after the Old Firm derby (Celtic vs Rangers), on 31 March 2019, David Hamilton, vice-chairman of the Scottish Police Federation, stated that because of the repeal of the act, "some people feel wrongly legitimised to behave in a way that they wouldn’t otherwise behave." The issue of sectarian chanting was once again raised in 2024 by Hibernian following its decision to reduce ticket allocations for away fans due to "abhorrent behaviour and chanting" during their Scottish Cup quarter-final match against Rangers.
