= Fernando Casanova (actor) =

Mexican actor (1925–2012)

- Born: Fernando Gutiérrez López; 24 November 1925; Guadalajara, Jalisco, Mexico
- Died: 16 November 2012 (aged 86); Mexico City, Mexico
- Other name: Fred Canow
- Occupation: Actor

Fernando Casanova - born Fernando Gutiérrez López; (24 November 1925 – 16 November 2012) was a Mexican actor who began his career during the Golden Age of Mexican cinema, and in the 1960s reached the height of his success, becoming one of the most popular actors at the time.

== Life and career ==
Casanova was born Fernando Gutiérrez López on 24 November 1925, though some sources state 1922. As a teenager, he aspired to be a bullfighter, eventually leaving his studies to follow said occupation. He had the opportunity to debut in the Toreo de la Condesa in Mexico City, where he was gored on his right leg. Afterwards, Casanova would return to the bullring, but a few years afterwards, he decided to leave the profession.

Casanova made his film debut in The Private Life of Mark Antony and Cleopatra (1947), and began appearing in secondary roles. In one of the films he appeared in, Si Adelita se fuera con otro, Jorge Negrete, the star of the film, demanded to director Chano Urueta to not have scenes at Casanova's side, due to Casanova being taller than him. He also participated School for Tramps (1955), by Rogelio A. González, alongside Miroslava and Pedro Infante. According to an anecdote, when Infante died and Casanova attended his funeral, a producer approached Casanova and told him "You should have died instead!".

Casanova sought to enter the Guinness World Records for being the actor with the most starring roles.

== Personal life and death ==
In 2010, at the age of 85, he married his partner of several years, María Gunariz, although he already had other previous marriages.

Casanova died in Mexico City on 16 November 2012 due to pulmonary complications caused by prostate cancer. He was survived at the time of his death by his wife María and their children Fernando, Adriana and Ligia.

== Selected filmography ==
- The Private Life of Mark Antony and Cleopatra (1947)
- I Am a Charro of Rancho Grande (1947)
- Felipe Was Unfortunate (1947)
- Juan Charrasqueado (1948)
- Que Dios me perdone (1948)
- A Galician in Mexico (1949)
- The Doorman (1950)
- El Desalmado (1950)
- Get Your Sandwiches Here (1951)
- Tenement House (1951)
- Among Lawyers I See You (1951)
- Manos de seda (1951)
- The Martyr of Calvary (1952)
- The Border Man (1952)
- Él (1953)
- Cinnamon Skin (1953)
- The Sword of Granada (1953)
- School for Tramps (1955)
- The Bandits of Cold River (1956)
- El crucifijo de piedra (1956)
- No soy monedita de oro (1959)
- Cuando se quiere se quiere (1959)
- Tomy's Secret (1963)
- The Sign of the Coyote (1963)
- Creature of the Walking Dead (1965)
- Los dos apóstoles (1966)
- National Mechanics (1972)
