= Circus Royale =

Australian circus

Origin
- Country: Australia
- Founder(s): Damian Syred
- Year founded: 1971

Information
- Travelling show?: Yes - Australia, New Zealand, South East Asia
- Circus tent?: Yes
- Type of acts: juggling; motorcycles; magic
- Website: circusroyale.com

Circus Royale is an Australian circus owned and operated by Damian Syred, who acquired the circus in 2007. The show is a traditional circus with acts including aerial performances, juggling, as well as some magic.

== History ==
The circus was founded in 1971 by the Gasser family. Syred bought the circus from Frank and Manuela Gasser in 2007.

While the circus was in Broome in 2013, cows, camels, llamas, horses, and donkeys briefly escaped from their enclosures, "as onlookers watched with amusement".

During the COVID-19 pandemic in 2020, the circus was unable tofrom March that year, due to lockdowns. Twenty-two of the circus's international staff were unable to return home and were ineligible for government support and the circus turned to crowdfunding.

In 2021, Circus Royal Australia Pty Ltd pleaded guilty to employing children without the mandatory permit, after one of the three 13-year-old Chinese children employed by the circus spent 10 days in hospital due to injuries the child sustained from a trapeze. The company was not convicted, after the judge noted the lack of prior offences, and 'good character', however a fine of $21 000 AUD was applied.

== Links ==
- http://circusfans.com.au/
