= Wild Animals in Circuses Act 2019 =

United Kingdom law

- Act of Parliament
- Parliament of the United Kingdom
- Long title: An Act to make provision to the use of wild animals in travelling ciruses
- Citation: 2019 c. 24
- Introduced by: Michael Gove MP, Secretary of State for Environment, Food and Rural Affairs (Commons); Lord Gardiner of Kimble (Lords)
- Territorial extent: England and Wales

Dates
- Royal assent: 24 July 2019
- Commencement: 20 January 2020

Status: Current legislation

History of passage through Parliament

Text of statute as originally enacted

Text of the Wild Animals in Circuses Act 2019 as in force today (including any amendments) within the United Kingdom, from legislation.gov.uk.

The Wild Animals in Circuses Act 2019 (c. 24) is an act of the Parliament of the United Kingdom which prohibited the use of wild animals in travelling circuses.

== Provisions ==
The provisions of the act include:

- Prohibiting the use of wild animals in travelling circuses in England. Breaching this law was made an offence punishable with a fine.
- Making provision for inspections of circuses to ensure compliance.
- Amending Section 5(2) of the Dangerous Wild Animals Act 1976 to make it apply only to Wales.

=== Definitions ===
- "Wild animals" are defined as those not commonly domesticated in Great Britain.
- Animals are "used" if they perform or are exhibited as part of the circus.

== See also ==
- Animal acts in circuses
- Wild Animals in Travelling Circuses (Scotland) Act 2018
- Wild Animals and Circuses (Wales) Act 2020
