= Santo contra el cerebro diabolico =

- Theatrical release poster
- Directed by: Federico Curiel
- Written by: Federico Curiel
- Starring: Fernando Casanova; Ana Bertha Lepe; Rodolfo Guzmán Huerta
- Cinematography: Fernando Colín
- Edited by: José Juan Munguía
- Music by: Enrico C. Cabiati (credited as Enrico Cabiati); Federico Curiel
- Production company: Azteca Films
- Distributed by: Something Weird Video
- Release date: 17 May 1963
- Running time: 90 minutes
- Country: Mexico
- Language: Spanish

Santo contra el cerebro diabolico (Santo vs. the Diabolical Brain) is a 1963 Mexican action film directed by Federico Curiel, written by Curiel and Antonio Orellana and starring Santo y Ana Bertha Lepe.

== Cast ==
- Santo as himself (credited as Santo el Enmascarado de Plata)
- Fernando Casanova as Fernando Lavalle
- Ana Bertha Lepe as Virginia
- Roberto Ramírez Garza (Beto 'el Boticario') as Conrado
- Luis Aceves Castañeda as Refugio Canales
- Celia Viveros as La Jarocha
- José Chávez as Roque
- Augusto Benedico as Santo's assistant
- Manuel Dondé as Carlos
