= Hemitoxin =

Hemitoxin (HTX; α-KTx6.15) is a 35-mer basic peptide from the venom of the Iranian scorpion Hemiscorpius lepturus, which reversibly blocks K_{v}1.1, K_{v}1.2 and K_{v}1.3 voltage-gated K^{+} channels.

== Sources ==
HTX is a neurotoxin derived from the venom of the scorpion Hemiscorpius lepturus, which is found in the southwest province of Iran, Khuzestan. Hemitoxin constitutes about 0.1% of all venom proteins found in the Hemiscorpius lepturus venom gland.

== Chemistry ==
HTX is a peptide composed of 35 amino acids including eight cysteine residues which are cross linked forming four intramolecular cystine amino acids via disulfide bridges. It belongs to subfamily 6 of the α-KTx family of potassium channel scorpion toxins and has the highest sequence similarity with Maurotoxin (MTX), which is derived from a Tunisian scorpion called Scorpio maurus palmatus. MTX is also a K^{+} channel blocker but is composed of 34 amino acids instead of 35.

== Target ==
HTX is a voltage-gated K^{+} channel blocker peptide. It reversibly blocks type K_{v}1.1, K_{v}1.2 and K_{v}1.3 channels with IC_{50} values of 13, 16 and 2 nM, respectively. HTX has a different affinity for K^{+} channels. It appears to be 20 times less potent on K_{v}1.2 channels and 90 times more potent on K_{v}1.3 channels than the α-KTx6 family member MTX.

== Mode of Action ==
HTX causes reversible current inhibition on K_{v}1.1, K_{v}1.2 and K_{v}1.3 channels.

== Toxicity ==
Intracerebroventricular injection of HTX has been shown to cause neurotoxic symptoms in mice with an LD_{50} of 0.3 μg per 20 g body weight.
