= Wild Animals and Circuses (Wales) Act 2020 =

Welsh act banning wild animal use in circuses

Wild Animals and Circuses (Wales) Act 2020 (Note: Section 13.)
- Act of Senedd Cymru
- Senedd Cymru
- Long title: An Act of the National Assembly for Wales to make it an offence to use wild animals in travelling circuses; and to make miscellaneous changes to the licensing of circuses and dangerous wild animals
- Citation: 2020 asc 2
- Introduced by: Lesley Griffiths MS
- Territorial extent: Wales

Dates
- Royal assent: 7 September 2020
- Commencement: 1 December 2020 (Note: Section 12.)

Other legislation
- Amends: Zoo Licensing Act 1981

Status: Current legislation

History of passage through the Senedd

Text of statute as originally enacted

Revised text of statute as amended

Text of the Wild Animals and Circuses (Wales) Act 2020 as in force today (including any amendments) within the United Kingdom, from legislation.gov.uk.

The Wild Animals and Circuses (Wales) Act 2020 (asc 2) is an act of Senedd Cymru, which bans circuses from using wild animals.

== Background ==
Wild animals had been a feature of travelling circuses in the United Kingdom since the birth of the modern circus. Wild animals were hunted and captured in the colonies on an increasing scale in the second half of the nineteenth century with high mortality rates for the animals

From 2006, the RSPCA had been campaigning for circus animals to be banned, since the passage of the Animal Welfare Act 2006, which did not explicitly banning wild animals from being used in circuses instead leaving this to regulations through secondary legislation that was not laid before Parliament before the 2010 general election.

In 2015, Rebecca Evans, the Deputy Minister for Farming and Food described there being "no place" for animal circuses in Wales, hinting at a possible future ban.

In 2016, the Welsh Government held a review about potentially banning on the use of wild animals in circuses. After the consultation, Powys County Council banned the use of council property to promote circuses using wild animals and stopped licensing circuses that used wild animals.

The bill was introduced into the Welsh Assembly in 2019 by the Welsh Government. Lesley Griffiths AM, the Minister for Environment, Energy and Rural Affairs, affirmed her support for the legislation on the grounds of ethical concerns, but said that the evidence for doing it on the grounds of animal welfare was lacking.

== Provisions ==
The provisions of the act include:

- Prohibiting the use of wild animals in travelling circuses in Wales. Breaching this law was made an offence punishable with a fine.
- Making provision for inspections of circuses to ensure compliance.

The act defines "wild animals" as those which are not normally found in the British Islands.

== Reception ==
The Act was described as "illiberal" by Thomas Chipperfield, a circus performer described as "Britain's last lion tamer".

RSPCA Cymru supported the Act, describing it as "a historic day" and describing policy in Wales matching "societal norms and values" towards "fellow creatures".

== See also ==
- Wild Animals in Travelling Circuses (Scotland) Act 2018
- Wild Animals in Circuses Act 2019
