= María Eugenia Rubio (singer) =

- Born: 1933; Mexico
- Died: 9 December 2013 (aged 80) Acapulco, Guerrero, Mexico
- Genres: Bolero; rock and roll
- Occupations: Singer, actress
- Instrument: Vocals
- Labels: Musart; Orfeón

María Eugenia Rubio (1933 – 9 December 2013) was a Mexican singer and actress, specialized in the musical genres of bolero and rock and roll.

She began her career singing boleros and recording songs such as "Cachito" and "Te adoraré más y más" for Musart Records.

In the early 1960s, she found greater success as a rock and roll singer and recorded two studio albums with the Orfeón label. She also appeared as an actress in the Mexican films A ritmo de twist and Las hijas del Amapolo (both 1962), where she sang her hit single "Fuiste tú".

== Discography ==
- Cándida..! con María Eugenia Rubio (1961)
- María Eugenia Rubio (1962)

== Filmography ==
- Jóvenes y rebeldes (1961)
- A ritmo de twist (1962)
- Las hijas del Amapolo (1962)
