= Fanny Cano =

Mexican actress (1944–1983)

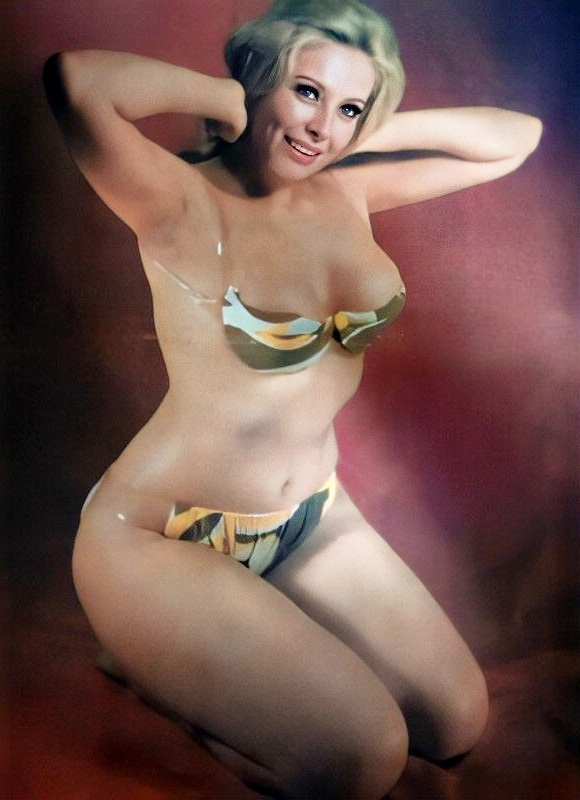
- Cano in 1965
- Born: María Francisca Isabel Cano Damián; 28 February 1944; Huetamo, Michoacán, Mexico
- Died: 7 December 1983 (aged 39); Madrid, Spain
- Burial place: Panteón Jardín, Mexico City
- Education: School of Philosophy and Letters, UNAM (dropped out)
- Occupation: Actress
- Years active: 1962-1983
- Spouse: Sergio Luis Cano (1980-1983)

María Francisca Isabel Cano Damián (28 February 1944 – 7 December 1983), professionally known as Fanny Cano, was a Mexican actress and producer.

== Life and career ==
=== Early years ===
María Francisca Isabel Cano Damián was born on 28 February 1944 in Huetamo de Núñez, Michoacán, the second of the six children of Francisco Cano Romero and Aurelia Damián Espinoza.

In 1961, supported by publicist Jaime Valdés, she took part in an acting workshop taught by Seki Sano, which led to her debut as an actress in the play Baby Doll and to film the movie El cielo y la tierra, released in 1962. That same year, she entered to the Faculty of Philosophy and Letters of the National Autonomous University of Mexico (UNAM) to pursue a degree in psychology, which she eventually abandoned, since she had made contacts in the entertainment industry that allowed her, instead, to pursue a professional career as an artist.

=== Acting foray ===
In 1963, she obtained her first starring role in Entrega inmediata (1963), which was followed by notable performances in films such as Buenas noches, año nuevo (1964), Escuela para solteras (1965), Despedida de soltera (1966) and Las amiguitas de los ricos (1967).

Although she already had a consolidated career in film, it was on television where she achieved her greatest success, starring in telenovelas such as Rubí of 1968, Yesenia of 1971, and Muñeca of 1974. In 1980, she married a man named Sergio Luis Cano. A year later, she filmed what would be her last film, Una leyenda de amor, released in 1982, which turned out to be her final acting credit.

During the course of 1983, she began a new personal phase, moving away from showbiz after discovering meditation through a spiritual order, which led her to reflect on her life, sell all her properties, distribute her material goods among her family members, and dedicate herself to altruistic works.

== Death ==
On 7 December 1983, after spending some time in Spain, Cano was planning a fly to Rome, Italy, where she was scheduled to meet up with her sister and niece to travel to India. Departing from what was then known as Madrid–Barajas Airport, she boarded a Boeing 727 belonging to the Spanish airline Iberia. The day of her trip dawned with heavy fog, and while the plane was on the runway preparing for takeoff to Rome-Fiumicino Airport, a miscalculation in the flight maneuvers, combined with the bad weather, caused her aircraft to collide with another plane also preparing for takeoff. The collision caused her multiple traumatic injuries that resulted in her instant death at the age of 39. Her remains were repatriated to Mexico and buried in a crypt within the National Association of Actors (ANDA) section of the cemetery Panteón Jardín in Mexico City.

== Filmography ==
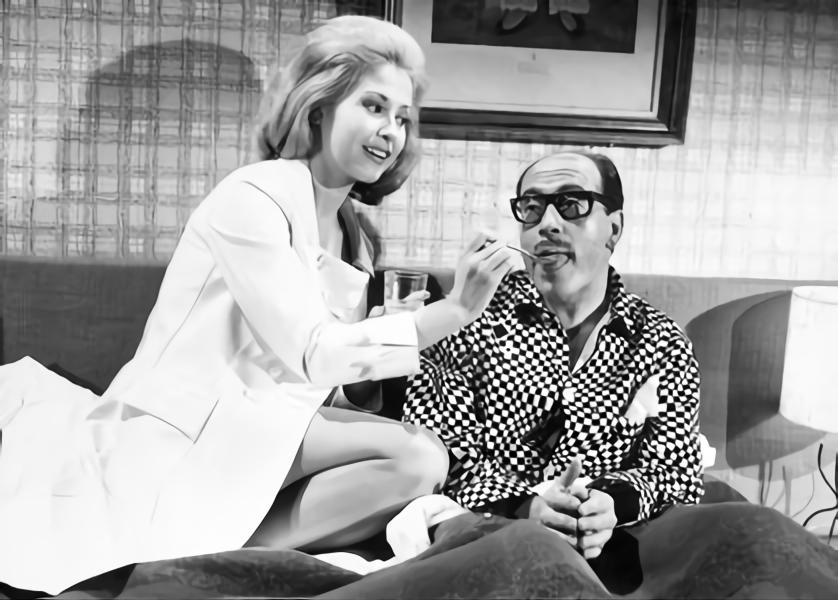
Cano in a publicity photograph for the film Operación secretaria (1966)

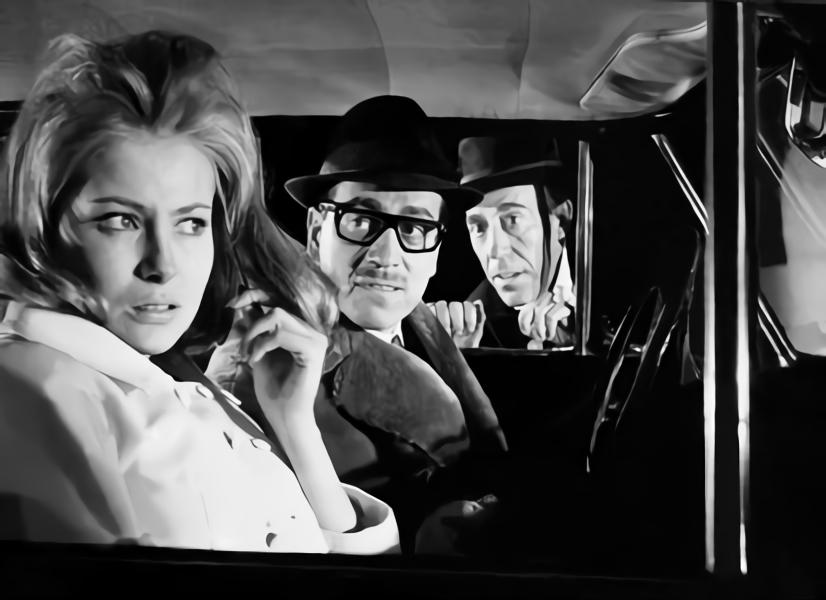
Cano in the film Operación secretaria (1966).

=== Film ===
- El cielo y la tierra (1962)
- División narcóticos (1963)
- Dile que la quiero (1963)
- Entrega inmediata (1963)
- Frente al destino (1964)
- El solitario (1964)
- Duelo en el desierto (1964)
- Buenas noches, año nuevo (1964)
- Los reyes del volante (1964)
- Escuela para solteras (1965)
- Despedida de soltera (1966) - Susana
- Juventud sin ley (1966) - Ofelia
- Las amiguitas de los ricos (1967)
- Los perversos (a go go) (1967) - Julieta
- Operación Secretaria (1966)
- Sí quiero (1967)
- Arrullo de Dios (1967)
- Cómo pescar marido (1967)
- Un largo viaje hacia la muerte (1968)
- Un nuevo modo de amar (1968)
- El amor y esas cosas (1969)
- La amante perfecta (1970)
- Tres noches de locura (1970)
- Las cadenas del mal (1970)
- Flor de durazno (1970)
- Los jóvenes amantes (1971)
- Una mujer honesta (1972; also a producer)
- Las cautivas (1973; also a producer) - Lucha
- Zona roja (1976) - Leonor
- La güera Rodríguez (1978)
- La leyenda de Rodrigo (1981)
- Una leyenda de amor (1982) - Amanda Cabrera

=== Production ===
- Victoria (1972)

=== Television ===
- La mentira (1965) - Virginia
- Rubí (1968) - Rubí Pérez Carvajal
- Yesenia (1971) - Yesenia
- Penthouse (1973)
- Muñeca (1974) - Muñeca
- María José (1978) - María José
- Espejismo (1980-1981) - Laura
