= List of Mexican films of the 1920s =

A list of films produced in the Cinema of Mexico in the 1920s, ordered by year of release from 1920 to 1929. For an alphabetical list of articles on Mexican films see Category:Mexican films.

== 1920s ==
Title	Director	Cast	Genre	Notes
1920
El Zarco or Los Plateados	José Manuel Ramos			
Hasta después de la muerte	Ernesto Vollrath	Emma Padilla		
1921
En la hacienda	Ernesto Vollrath			
De raza azteca	Guillermo "Indio" Calles, Miguel Contreras Torres			
El caporal	Miguel Contreras Torres			
1922
Fanny or El robo de veinte millones	Ernesto Vollrath			
El hombre sin patria	Miguel Contreras Torres			
La parcela	Ernesto Vollrath			
1923
Atavismo	Gustavo Sáenz de Sicilia			
El hijo de la loca	José S. Ortiz			
1924
Almas tropicales	Manuel R. Ojeda, Miguel Contreras Torres			
Un drama en la aristocracia	Gustavo Sáenz de Sicilia			
1925
El buitre	Gabriel García Moreno			
Tras las bambalinas del Bataclán	William P. S. Earle			
1926
El Cristo de oro	Manuel R. Ojeda	Otilia Zambrano, Fanny Schiller		
Del rancho a la capital	Eduardo Urriola			
El indio yaqui	Guillermo "Indio" Calles			
1927
Conspiración	Manuel R. Ojeda			
Una catástrofe en el mar	Eduardo Urriola			
El león de la Sierra Morena	Miguel Contreras Torres			
El puño de hierro	Gabriel García Moreno			
Raza de bronce	Guillermo "Indio" Calles			
El tren fantasma	Gabriel García Moreno			
Yo soy tu padre	Juan Bustillo Oro			
1928
El gran almuerzo de José Campo	Chano Urueta			
El secreto de la abuela	Cándida Beltrán Rendón			
Sol de gloria	Guillermo "Indio" Calles			
1929
Aguiluchos mexicanos	Miguel Contreras Torres, Gustavo Sáenz de Sicilia			
Alas de gloria	Ángel E. Álvarez			
La boda de Rosario	Gustavo Sáenz de Sicilia			
El coloso de mármol	Manuel R. Ojeda	Manuel R. Ojeda, Anita Ruiz, Carlos Villatoro		
Los hijos del destino	Charles Amador			
Terrible pesadilla	Luis Lezama			
