= Diego Corrientes =

Diego Corrientes may refer to:

- Diego Corrientes Mateos (1757-1781) a Spanish bandit
- Diego Corrientes (1914 film), a silent Spanish film directed by Alberto Marro
- Diego Corrientes (1924 film), a silent Spanish film directed by José Buchs
- Diego Corrientes (1937 film), a Spanish film directed by Ignacio F. Iquino
- Diego Corrientes (1959 film), a Spanish film directed by Antonio Isasi-Isasmendi
