= Sueño de amor =

Sueño de amor may refer to:

- Sueño de amor (1993 TV series), a Mexican telenovela
- Sueño de amor (2016 TV series), a Mexican telenovela
- Dreams of Love (1935 Mexican film)
