= Diego Corrientes (1937 film) =

- Directed by: Ignacio F. Iquino
- Written by: Juan López Nunez; Germán López Prieto
- Cinematography: Agustín Macasoli
- Edited by: Emilio Rodríguez
- Music by: Ramón Ferrés
- Production company: Diana Exclusivas
- Release date: 19 April 1937
- Running time: 82 minutes
- Country: Spain
- Language: Spanish

Diego Corrientes is a 1937 Spanish historical adventure film directed by Ignacio F. Iquino. It portrays the life of the eighteenth century highwaymen Diego Corrientes Mateos, one of four films to do so.

== Cast ==
- Goyita Herrero
- Pedro Terol as Diego Corrientes
- Blanquita Gil as Rosario
- Jesús Castro Blanco as El Renegao
- Federico Gandía as Teniente Bellido
- Paco Martínez Soria
- Gastón A. Mantua
- Juana Bozzo

== Bibliography ==
- de España, Rafael. Directory of Spanish and Portuguese film-makers and films. Greenwood Press, 1994.
