= Eugenio Retes =

Peruvian-Chilean actor and writer

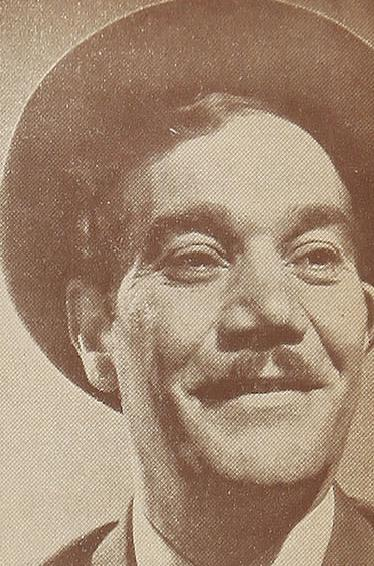
- Retes in 1942
- Born: 6 September 1895; Lima, Peru
- Died: 1 March 1987 (aged 91); Santiago de Chile
- Occupation(s): Actor, writer

Eugenio Retes Bisetti (6 September 1895 – 1 March 1987) was an actor and writer of Peruvian-Chilean origin who achieved popularity in Chilean comedy plays in the 1930s and in the 1940s and 1950s in musical comedy films directed by Eugenio de Liguoro and José Bohr.

== Filmography ==
=== Films as writer and actor ===
- Verdejo gasta un millón (1941)
- Verdejo gobierna en Villaflor (1942)
- Dos caídos de la luna (1945)
- Uno que ha sido marino (1951)
- El gran circo Chamorro (1955)
- Sonrisas de Chile (1969)

=== Films as actor ===
- Cabo de Hornos (1956)
- El burócrata González (1964)
