= Tu hijo (1935 film) =

1935 Mexican film by José Bohr

Tu hijo (also known as Amor de madre) is 1935 film directed by José Bohr. It was written and produced by Eva Limiñana.

== Cast ==
The film's cast features several prominent names from the Golden Age of Mexican Cinema:

- Julio Villarreal as Julio
- Mercedes Prendes as Elisa
- Elena D'Orgaz as Rosita
- Julián Soler as Carlos
- Isabelita Blanch as Nanette
- Joaquín Busquets as Nicolás
- Consuelo Segarra as Tomasa the cook
- Elisa Asperó as Rita
- Alberto Galán as friend of Carlos
- Carlos López y Valles ("Carlos López Chaflán") as servant
- Claudio Arrau as pianist

== Plot ==
Julio (Villarreal) and Elisa (Prendes) are a childless couple. Julio is a successful lawyer, but their servants (Blanch and Busquets, who provide the film's comic relief) suspect Elisa of having an affair with Julio's friend Carlos. Following the death of Rita, Elisa's sister, their niece Rosita (D'Orgaz) comes to live with the couple. After Rosita becomes pregnant by Julio, Elisa banishes her from their home. Rosita dies in childbirth, and her baby son is adopted by Julio and a repentant Elisa.

== Reception ==
In a 1935 review, U.S. newspaper El Tiempo de Laredo described Tu hijo as a "perfect" film, comparable to productions from European and American studios: "Tu Hijo is a moving story that will make mothers' hearts beat fast... A young mother sacrifices herself and her child for the happiness of others." The New York Times was less enthusiastic, describing it as telling an "old, old story" and criticizing an excessive use of close-ups in the cinematography.
