= Por mis pistolas (1938 film) =

- Directed by: José Bohr
- Written by: José Bohr; Eva Limiñana
- Produced by: José Bohr; Eva Limiñana
- Starring: Sara García
- Cinematography: Raúl Martínez Solares
- Edited by: José Bohr
- Music by: José Bohr
- Release date: 8 July 1938 (Mexico)
- Running time: 80 minutes
- Country: Mexico
- Language: Spanish

Por mis pistolas ("By My Pistols") is a 1938 Mexican comedy drama film directed, co-produced and co-written by José Bohr and starring Sara García.

== Cast ==
- Sara García
- Fernando Soler
- Domingo Soler
- Carmelita Bohr
- Julián Soler
- Guillermo Cantú Robert
- Georgette Somohano
- Ángel T. Sala
- Narciso Busquets
- Pepita González
- Ernesto Finance
- Aurora Walker
- María Porras
- Eusebio Pirrín
- Paco Martínez
- Pepe Martínez
