= Tu hijo =

Tu hijo may refer to:

- Tu hijo (1935 film), a 1935 Mexican motion picture alternatively titled Amor de madre
- Tu hijo, a 2018 Spanish motion picture released in English as Your Son
