= Daniel Bohr =

Argentinian-born Danish director (1943–2026)

- Born: December 29, 1943; Buenos Aires, Argentina
- Died: July 25, 2026 (aged 82)
- Occupations: Stage director, manager
- Years active: 1960–2026
- Parent(s): José Bohr (father); Bertita Bohr (mother)
- Awards: Best Director, Festival Internacional de Teatro de Barcelona (1967); Yorick Theatre Prize (1968)

Daniel Bohr (December 29, 1943 – July 25, 2026) was an Argentine-born Danish stage director and theatre manager who has directed over 150 productions, including plays, operas, and musicals, across Scandinavia, Europe, and South America. He was the son of José Bohr.

== Early life and career ==
Daniel Bohr was born in Buenos Aires, Argentina on December 29, 1943. He was the son of José Bohr, a German-born Chilean film director, and his wife, Bertita Bohr, musician and sociologist.

Bohr started his career as a stage director and theater director. He began his career in Chile, where he staged many works by playwrights like Eugène Ionesco and Samuel Beckett in the 1960s. He was trained as a film director in Spain and founded El Nuevo Teatro Experimental in Madrid. In 1972, he settled in Denmark, quickly becoming a famous director in Scandinavian theater. He served as the director of Den Jyske Opera, the general manager of the Aalborg Theater, and director of the Bergen International Festival in Norway. He directed major productions across Europe and the Americas such as West Side Story, The Sound of Music, Master Class, and classic operas like La Traviata and Faust.

During 2004 to 2016, Many productions of Bohr received the Reumert Award. According to Det Ny Teater, Bohr is the only one to have received the Reumert Award for the same production twice.

== Death ==
Bohr died on July 25, 2026, at the age of 82.
