= Limiñana =

Limiñana is a Spanish surname. It may refer to:

- Eva Limiñana (1895–1953), Argentinian musician and filmmaker.
- Lionel and Marie Limiñana, a French rock band (2009 - present).
