= El rosario de Amozoc =

- Directed by: José Bohr
- Produced by: Vicente Saisó Piquer
- Starring: Lupita Tovar; Carlos Orellana; Emilio Tuero
- Cinematography: Raúl Martínez Solares
- Edited by: Lupita Marino
- Music by: Gonzalo Curiel
- Release date: 1938
- Country: Mexico
- Language: Spanish

El rosario de Amozoc ("The Rosary of Amozoc") is a 1938 Mexican film directed by José Bohr. It stars Lupita Tovar, Carlos Orellana, Emilio Tuero, Elena D'Orgaz, Daniel "Chino" Herrera and Ernesto Cortázar.

== Reception ==
The film was said "not to exceed the level of mediocre. The humor proposed by the scriptwriters did not adapt much to the director's temperament. Full of conventions and vulgar dialogues." It was however described by Emilio Riera as a "funny and colorful costumbrista comedy".
