= Víctor Urruchúa =

Mexican actor

- Born: 30 December 1912; Mexico
- Died: 1981 (aged 68–69); Mexico
- Occupations: Actor; Film director Screenwriter
- Years active: 1926–1953

Víctor Urruchúa (30 December 1912 – 1981) was a Mexican actor, film director and screenwriter. He appeared in 24 films between 1926 and 1951. He also directed 15 films between 1944 and 1953.

== Selected filmography ==
- Two Monks (1934 - actor)
- Judas (1936 - actor)
- The Priest's Secret (1941 - actor)
- Simón Bolívar (1942 - actor)
- Lightning in the South (1943)
- Ramona (1946 - directed)
- Luz en el páramo (1953 - directed)
