= Two Monks =

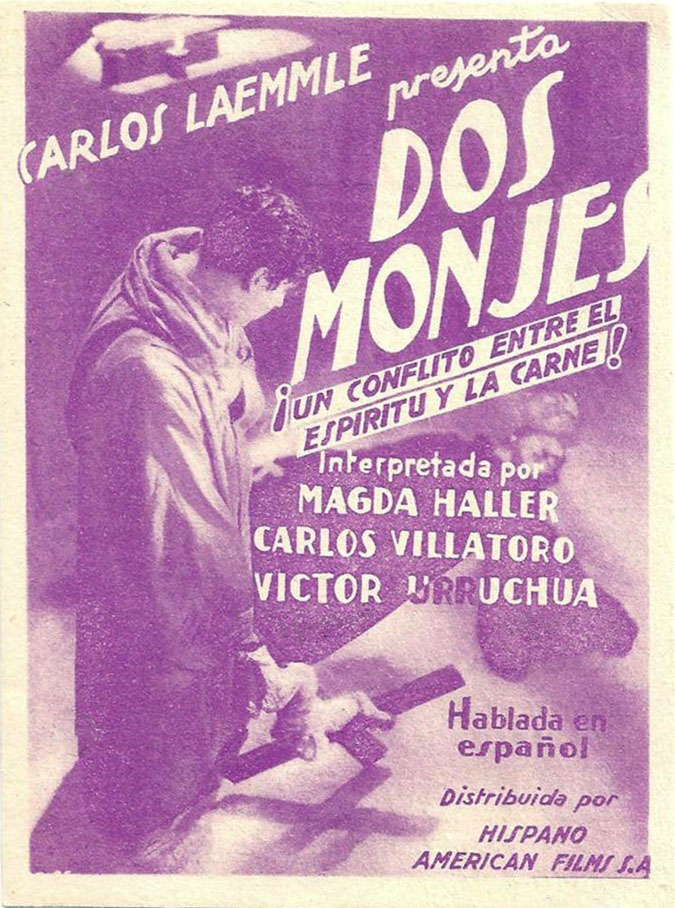
- Spanish-language poster used for the US release
- Directed by: Juan Bustillo Oro
- Written by: Juan Bustillo Oro; José Manuel Cordero
- Produced by: José San Vicente; Miguel San Vicente
- Starring: Víctor Urruchúa; Carlos Villatoro; Magda Haller; Beltrán de Heredia
- Cinematography: Agustín Jiménez
- Edited by: Juan Bustillo Oro
- Music by: Max Urban
- Production company: Proa Films
- Distributed by: Adolfo Grovas
- Release dates: 28 November 1934 (Mexico); 20 January 1935 (US)
- Running time: 85 minutes 79 minutes (US cut)
- Country: Mexico
- Language: Spanish

Two Monks (Spanish: Dos monjes) is a 1934 Mexican expressionist melodrama film directed and co-written by Juan Bustillo Oro and starring Víctor Urruchúa and Carlos Villatoro.

== Production ==
Filmed in black-and-white on 35 mm Academy ratio film. The film's sets were designed by the art director Carlos Toussaint.

== Plot ==
In a Gothic monastery, an ailing monk, Brother Javier, has been acting out with violent emotions. The prior, fearing that he might be possessed by evil spirits, asks a new monk, Brother Juan, to tend to him. When Juan enters Javier's cell, the two recognize each other, and Juan runs out, followed by Javier, who strikes him with a crucifix and retreats back to his cell.

Questioned by the prior, Javier reveals that he and Juan had once been best friends but that Juan had betrayed him. He then relates this story through a flashback. Some time before, Javier is a consumptive composer working on a song. Ana, a young woman who lives in the next house, sings along with him but is forced away from the window by her parents. When a prospective suitor calls on Ana, Javier is pleased to see that she has driven him away, but she is cast out by her parents. Javier and his mother take Ana in, and Javier eventually proposes marriage.

Javier is happy to see his friend Juan return from a long voyage, but as the two friends and Ana spend time together, Juan seems attracted to Ana while Javier's illness becomes more severe. Apparently recovering, Juan is surprised when Javier tells him that he must go away again and asks Javier one evening to help his lawyer review some business matters. Feeling ill, Javier returns to home early only to find Ana pushing herself away from Juan's embrace. Javier strikes Juan, who pulls out a pistol. When Juan shoots, though, Ana rushes between the two men and is killed. In his monastery cell, Javier concludes his story and asks the prior for absolution. The prior, though, tells Javier that he must seek it from Juan.

Juan also confesses and relates his version of the events described by Juan. He reveals that he and Ana had been in love before she met Javier, but the two were forced to part. Ana is still in love with Juan, but she feels obligated to marry Javier in gratitude for his support of her. When Javier becomes gravely ill, Ana believes that a marriage to him will be a short one, but Javier's apparent recovery leads Juan to plan to go far away from Ana. Sending Javier to his lawyer's office, Juan uses the occasion to see Ana one last time, but he is overcome by his emotions and tries to kiss her. Just then Javier returns, and in Juan's version of the story, it is Javier who accidentally shoots and kills Ana.

Javier, now gravely ill and mentally overcome, runs out of his cell to the monastery's pipe organ, where he plays a dissonant version of the song he had earlier been composing. Turning around, he sees the prior and other monks gathered and envisions them as primitive grosteque figures about to attack him, and he collapses. Juan rushes to him and holds his former friend as Javier dies. The last image is of a cross above the door, suggesting some redemption.

== Cast ==
- Víctor Urruchúa as Juan
- Carlos Villatoro as Javier
- Magda Haller as Ana
- Beltrán de Heredia as Prior
- Emma Roldán as Gertrudis

== Reception ==
In 2020 Two Monks was added to the Criterion Collection, spine #1048. Its visual style was compared to German Expressionism by Criterion, who praised it as "vividly stylized, broodingly intense." Charles Ramírez Berg called it an "existential mystery […] a brooding meditation on why things happened the way they did and an inconclusive inquiry into whether they could have happened some other way." The use of flashbacks giving contradictory accounts of the same event has been compared to Rashomon (1950), which Two Monks preceded by 16 years. On the other hand, Carl J. Mora dismissed it as a "timid experiment" in his Mexican Films: A General History, 1896-1976 (1981).
