= Hollywood, City of Dreams =

1931 film

- Directed by: George Crone
- Produced by: Ray Kirkwood
- Starring: José Bohr; Lia Torá; Donald Reed
- Edited by: George Crone
- Production company: Fenix Film
- Distributed by: Universal Pictures
- Release date: December 31, 1931
- Running time: 72 minutes
- Country: United States
- Language: Spanish

Hollywood, City of Dreams (Spanish:Hollywood, ciudad de ensueno) is a 1931 American drama film directed by George Crone and starring José Bohr, Lia Torá and Donald Reed. It was a Spanish-language film made in the United States, as part of an effort to reach Spanish-speaking audiences around the world following the introduction of sound. Unlike some other Spanish-language films of the era, it was not a remake of an English film but an original story.

A young immigrant hopes to make it big in Hollywood and meet his idol, a female film star. He goes through a number of minor jobs but eventually gets his break and begins a romance with his heroine. Nonetheless, the film ends on a downbeat note as he returns on a boat to his native country.

== Cast ==
- José Bohr as José
- Lia Torá as Helen Gordon
- Donald Reed as Actor
- Nancy Drexel as Alice
- Enrique Acosta as Film Director
- Elena Landeros
- César Vanoni
- Nicanor Molinare
- Julia Bejarano
- Mirra Rayo
- Luis Díaz Flores
- Samuel Pedraza
- Lloyd Ingraham

== Bibliography ==
- Jarvinen, Lisa. The Rise of Spanish-language Filmmaking: Out from Hollywood's Shadow, 1929-1939. Rutger's University Press, 2012.
