= The Call of the Blood (1934 film) =

- Directed by: José Bohr; Raphael J. Sevilla
- Written by: José Bohr; Eva Limiñana
- Starring: José Bohr; Virginia Fábregas; Elisa Robles
- Cinematography: Alex Phillips
- Release date: 10 May 1934
- Running time: 90 minutes
- Country: Mexico
- Language: Spanish

The Call of the Blood (Spanish original title: La sangre manda; lit. Blood commands) is a 1934 Mexican drama film written and directed by the German-Chilean filmmaker and actor José Bohr. It stars Bohr himself, Virginia Fábregas, Elisa Robles, and Sara García.

== Cast ==
- José Bohr: José Bolívar
- Virginia Fábregas: Doña Rosa
- Elisa Robles: Lupe
- Joaquín Busquets: Chato López
- Julio Villarreal: Julián 'El Pesao'
- Luis G. Barreiro: César, José's valet
- Godofredo de Velasco: Don Pedro Bolívar
- Beatriz Ramos: Lya Font
- Delia Magaña: Gladys, Lya's friend
- Consuelo Segarra: Chabela, a working class mother
- Elisa Asperó: Doña Amparo
- Sara García: Vecina
- Mario Herrero: Gaspar, steel worker
- Carlos López: Steel worker
- David Valle González: Doctor

== Reception ==
A review in The New York Times praised the beauty of Elisa Robles.
