= El Capitán Malacara =

- Directed by: Carlos Orellana
- Screenplay by: Carlos Orellana
- Based on: El Capitán Veneno by Pedro Antonio de Alarcón
- Release date: 1945
- Running time: 89 minutes
- Country: Mexico
- Language: Spanish

El Capitán Malacara ("Captain Malacara") is a 1945 Mexican film directed by Carlos Orellana. It stars Pedro Armendáriz and Manolita Saval.

== Cast ==
- Pedro Armendáriz
- Manolita Saval
- Armando Soto La Marina
- Amelia Wilhelmy
- Mimí Derba
- Elena D'Orgaz
- Ramón Vallarino
- Luis Alcoriza
- Roberto Cañedo
- Lauro Benítez
- Manuel Noriega
- Ramiro Gómez Kemp
- Consuelo Segarra
- Velia Martinez
