= Arturo Manrique =

Mexican actor

- Born: 1910; Monterrey, Mexico
- Died: 11 January 1971 (aged 60–61); Mexico
- Other name: Arturo Ernesto Manrique Elizondo
- Occupation: Actor
- Years active: 1934–1967 (film)

Arturo Manrique (1910–1971) was a Mexican film actor.

== Selected filmography ==
- The Woman of the Port (1934)
- The Treasure of Pancho Villa (1935)
- Luponini from Chicago (1935)
- Judas (1936)
- The Heavy Cross (1937)
- Song of the Soul (1938)
- Jesusita in Chihuahua (1942)
- Bandito (1956)

== Bibliography ==
- Emilio García Riera. Historia documental del cine mexicano: 1929-1937. Universidad de Guadaljara, 1992.
