= Leonora Amar =

Brazilian actress (1926–2014)

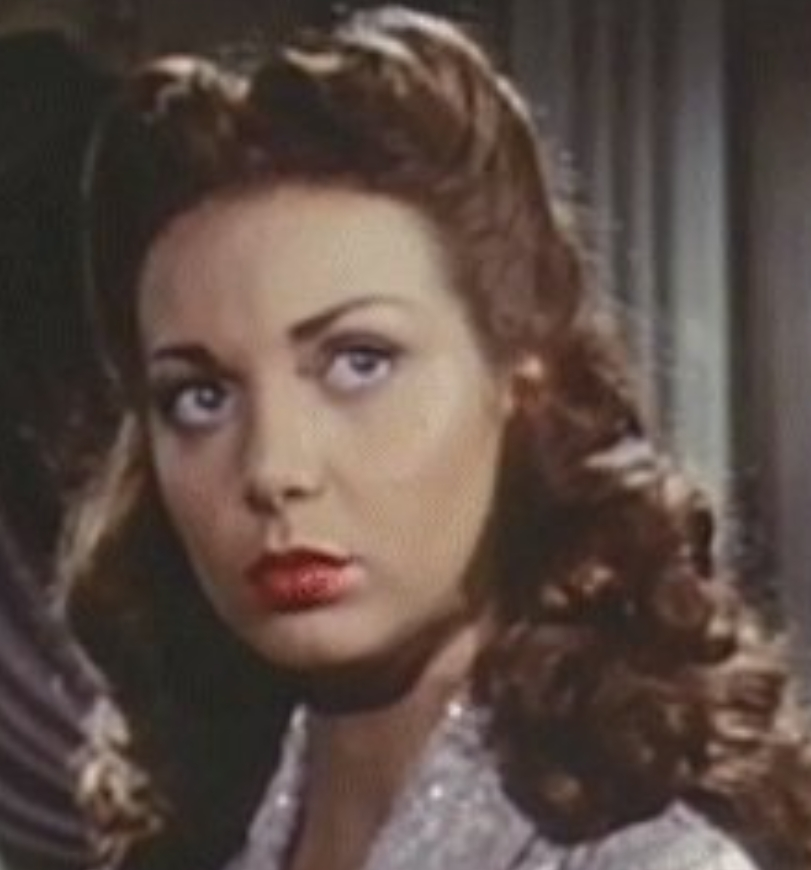
- Amar in Captain Scarlett (1953)
- Born: 1 March 1926; Rio de Janeiro, Brazil
- Died: 2 February 2014 (aged 87); Rio de Janeiro, Brazil
- Occupation: Actress
- Years active: 1947–1953
- Spouse: Luis Aldás

Leonora Amar (1 March 1926 – 2 February 2014) was a Brazilian film actress. In the mid-1940s she moved to Mexico, where she was dubbed by the press as The Brazilian Venus. She played leading roles in a number of films before retiring at the age of twenty seven. Her final film was the 1953 American runaway production swashbuckler Captain Scarlett that was filmed in Mexico.

She was married to the Argentine actor and co-star Luis Aldás at one point, although this may have been for publicity purposes.

== Selected filmography ==
- The Magician (1949)
- Zorina (1949)
- Captain Scarlett (1953)

== Bibliography ==
- Rogelio Agrasánchez. Beauties of Mexican Cinema. Agrasanchez Film Archive, 2001.
