= Isabel del Puerto =

Mexican-American model

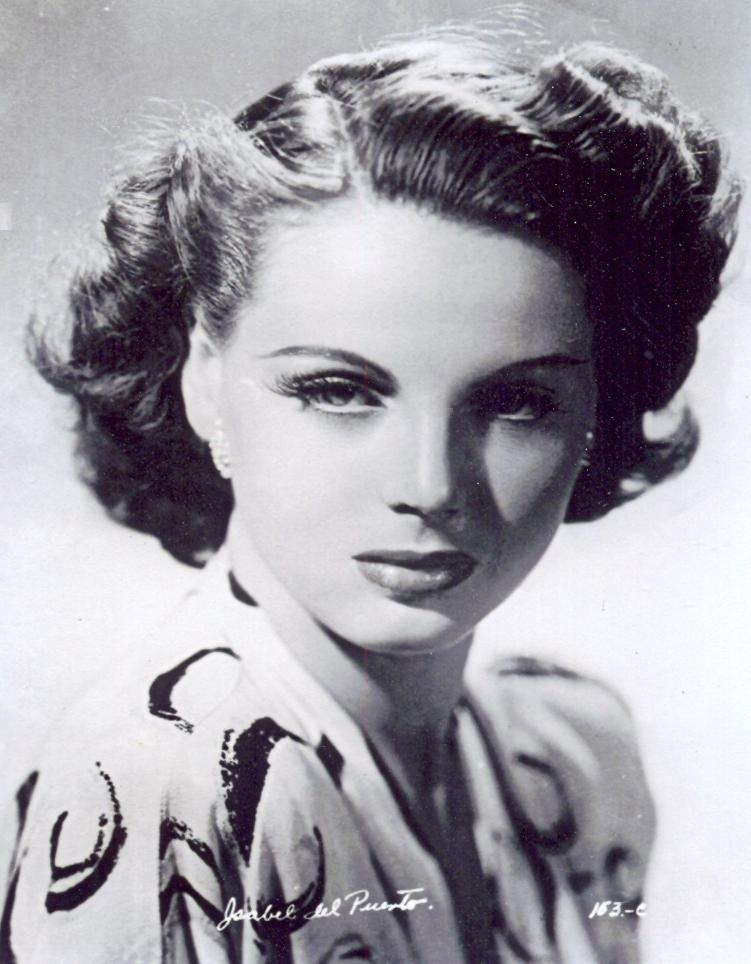
- Del Puerto c. 1947
- Born: Elisabeth von Hortenau; August 7, 1921; Vienna, Austria
- Died: March 13, 2014 (aged 92); San Antonio, Texas, United States
- Occupations: Model, actress, dancer, writer, photo-journalist, realtor and entrepreneur
- Years active: 1925–1989
- Spouses: Juan Hevia del Puerto (m. 1940; div. 1947); Hector Mendoza Orozco (m. 1951; div. 1956); Joe Oldham Lanett (m. 1973; died 1975)
- Children: Antonio Miguel Bohler; Joe Charles Oldham Lanett; Katherine Alexandra Oldham Lanett
- Parents: Charlotte Helene Beer; Alfred Joseph von Hortenau

Isabel del Puerto (born Elisabeth von Hortenau; August 7, 1921 – March 13, 2014) was an Austrian-born Mexican-American model, actress, dancer, writer, photojournalist and entrepreneur.

== Biography ==
=== Early life ===
Del Puerto was born Elisabeth von Hortenau, in Vienna, Austria, the daughter of Charlotte Helene Beer and Alfred Joseph von Hortenau, a cavalry officer in the Austro-Hungarian Army and illegitimate son of the Archduke Otto Francis of Austria. Her parents divorced when she was two years old.

=== Acting and modeling career ===
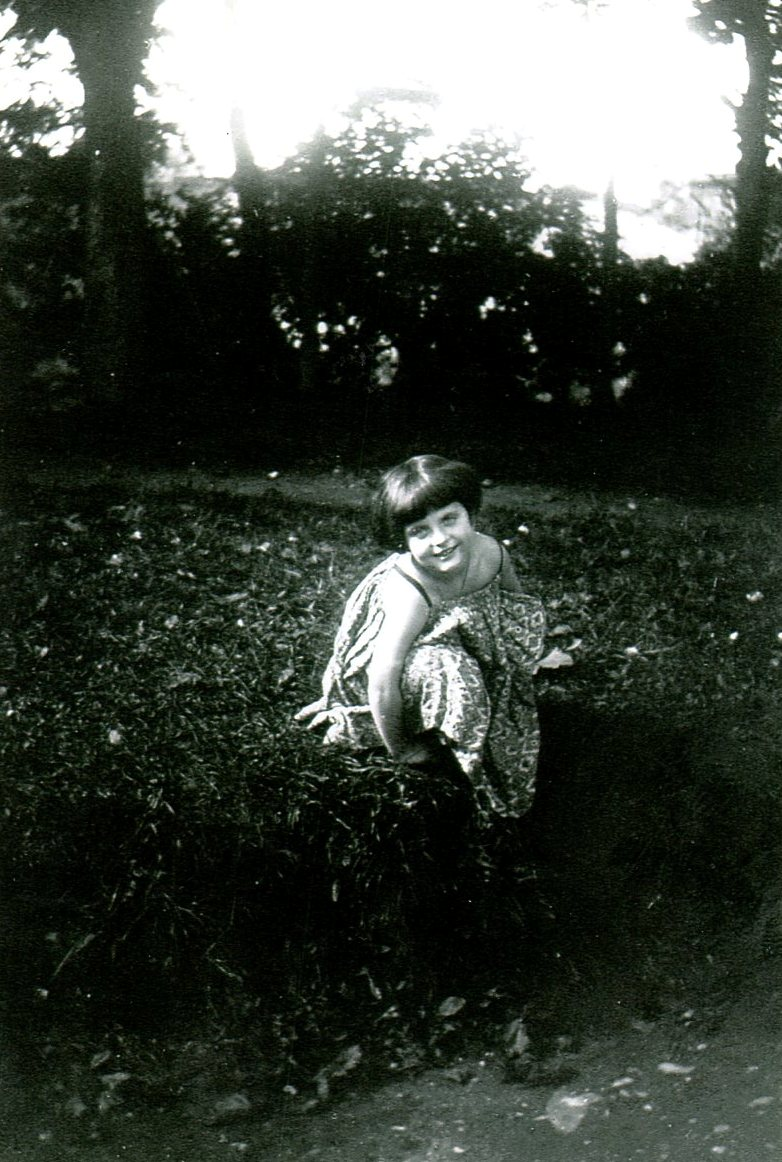
Isabel del Puerto when she was Isadora Duncan's dance student.

At four she made her stage debut under the guidance of Isadora Duncan and her grandmother Maria Schleinzer who was a vedette at the Vienna Court Opera.

She attended the Centro Sperimentale di Cinematografia in Rome, Italy, with Alida Valli and other stars of the 1930s.

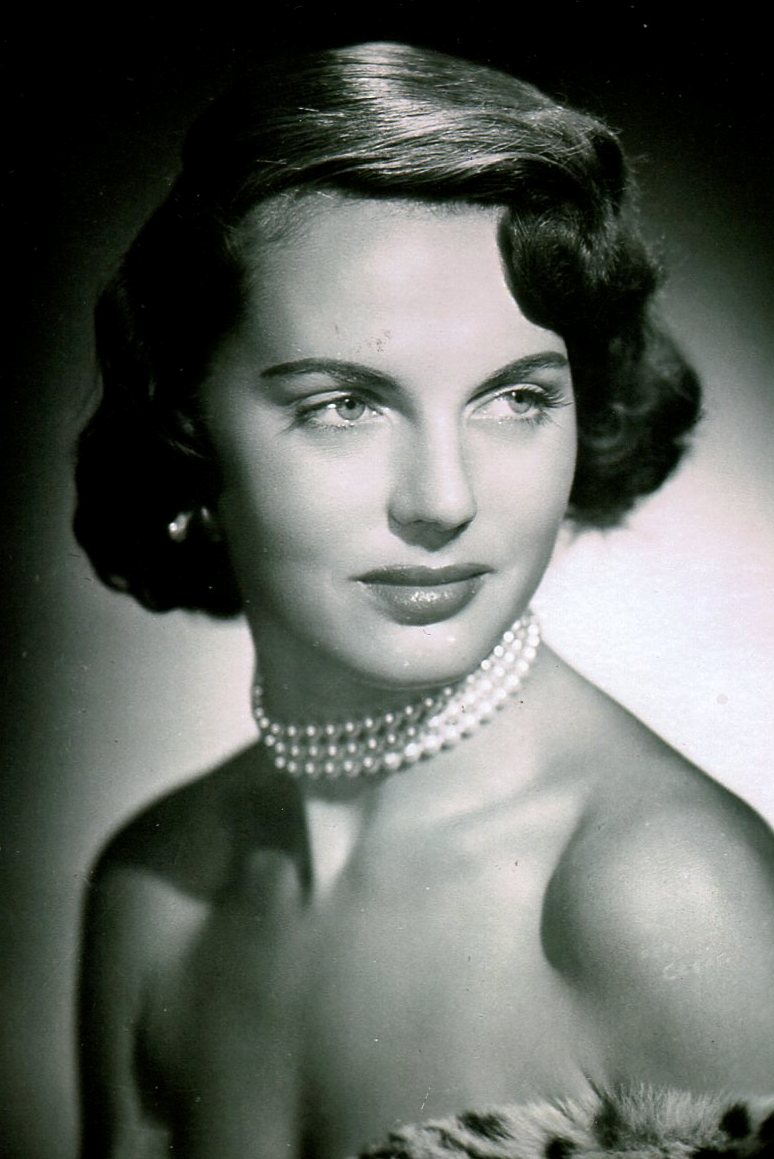
Isabel del Puerto, movie star, Golden Age of Mexican cinema

After a short career on Broadway, she went to Mexico, where she modeled for a department store and appeared in 17 films, becoming a star of the Golden Age of Mexican cinema of the 1940s and 1950s.

=== Other careers ===
After retiring from films, she worked for Time Life magazines and in advertising and public relations in New York.

She owned and cooked for five gourmet restaurants, among them El Cuchitril, a famous bistro in the Zona Rosa, Mexico City.

She was working on her fifth book (a novel set in the early 1900s). One of her oeuvres is a semi-fictitious biography called My Way, two are detective stories: "The Key" and "The Portrait" and one is a book for children, Sonia, which she hoped to have illustrated and published.

She had a real estate license, selling properties in Mexico and the United States.

=== Later life ===
In her last years, Isabel resided in San Antonio, Texas, with her three dogs that had been picked up as strays. She actively supported the Democratic Party and headed a charity that was trying to help homeless people and their pets.

On 13 March 2014, she died of an embolism at 6:30 p.m. after a brief hospitalization, surrounded by her son Joe, and daughter Kat.

== Filmography ==
Del Puerto has taken part in the following films:

- Nunca besaré tu boca (I Will Never Kiss Your Lips), Mexico, 1947.
- Mi madre adorada (My Mother Adored), Mexico, 1948.
- A Family Like Many Others, as Estela Cataño, Mexico, 1949.
- Midnight, as Lidia, Mexico, 1949.
- Hay lugar para... dos (There's a Place for... Two), as Elsa de Olivares, Mexico, 1949.
- Angels of the Arrabal, Mexico, 1949.
- Confessions of a Taxi Driver, as Elizabeth de Legazpi, Mexico, 1949.
- Ventarrón (Gale), as Mirna, Mexico, 1949.
- The Devil is a Woman as Clara, Mexico, 1950.
- Mariachis, Mexico, 1950.
- Matrimonio y mortaja (Marriage and Shroud), as Rosario, Mexico, 1950.
- Rosauro Castro, as Esperanza, Mexico, 1950.
- Entre abogados te veas (Among Lawyers I See You), as La amante, Mexico, 1951.
- El gendarme de la esquina (Policeman on the Corner), as Carolina Santillán, Mexico, 1951.
- Captain Scarlett, as Josephine Prenez, USA, 1953.
- Honey, I Shrunk the Kids, USA, 1989.
- Old Gringo, USA, 1989.

== Bibliography ==
- García Riera. Emilio, Breve historia del cine mexicano: primer siglo 1897-1987. México. Publisher: Conaculta, Imcine, Universidad de Guadalajara. Zapopan, Jalisco, Mexico. 1998. 466 pages.
- García Riera, Emilio, Historia Documental del Cine Mexicano. Época Sonora. 18 tomos. Publisher ERA. Mexico. 1971.
- Ayala Blanco. Jorge, La aventura del cine mexicano: en la época de oro y después. Mexico. Publisher: ERA. 1979. 422 pages.
