= Diego Corrientes (1914 film) =

- Directed by: Alberto Marro
- Written by: Alberto Marro
- Cinematography: Alberto Marro
- Production company: Hispano Films
- Release date: 1914
- Country: Spain
- Languages: Silent; Spanish intertitles

Diego Corrientes is a 1914 Spanish silent historical film directed by Alberto Marro. It portrays the life of the eighteenth century highwayman Diego Corrientes Mateos. It was the first of four films portraying his exploits.

== Cast ==
- Jaime Borrás
- Luisa Oliván

== Bibliography ==
- de España, Rafael. Directory of Spanish and Portuguese film-makers and films. Greenwood Press, 1994.
