= Judas (1936 film) =

1936 film by Manuel R. Ojeda

- Directed by: Manuel R. Ojeda
- Written by: Antonio Mediz Bolio; Gustavo Villatoro; Manuel R. Ojeda
- Produced by: Alfredo Villatoro; Carlos Villatoro
- Starring: Josefina Escobedo; Carlos Villatoro; Víctor Urruchúa
- Cinematography: Alex Phillips
- Edited by: Manuel R. Ojeda
- Music by: Raúl Lavista
- Production company: Remex
- Release date: 4 September 1936
- Country: Mexico
- Language: Spanish

Judas is a 1936 Mexican drama film directed by Manuel R. Ojeda and starring Josefina Escobedo, Carlos Villatoro and Víctor Urruchúa. The film's sets were designed by the art director José Rodríguez Granada.

== Cast ==
- Josefina Escobedo as Magdalena
- Carlos Villatoro as Emilio
- Víctor Urruchúa as Traidor
- Manuel Buendía as Hacendado
- Victorio Blanco as Judas
- Carlos López
- Arturo Manrique
- Esther Fernandez
- Manuel Noriega
- Consuelo Segarra
- Gilberto González
- Max Langler
- María Díaz de León
- Isauro Ruiz
- Alfonso Parra

== Bibliography ==
- Emilio García Riera. Historia documental del cine mexicano: 1929–1937. Universidad de Guadaljara, 1992.
