= Virginia Fábregas =

Mexican actress (1871–1950)

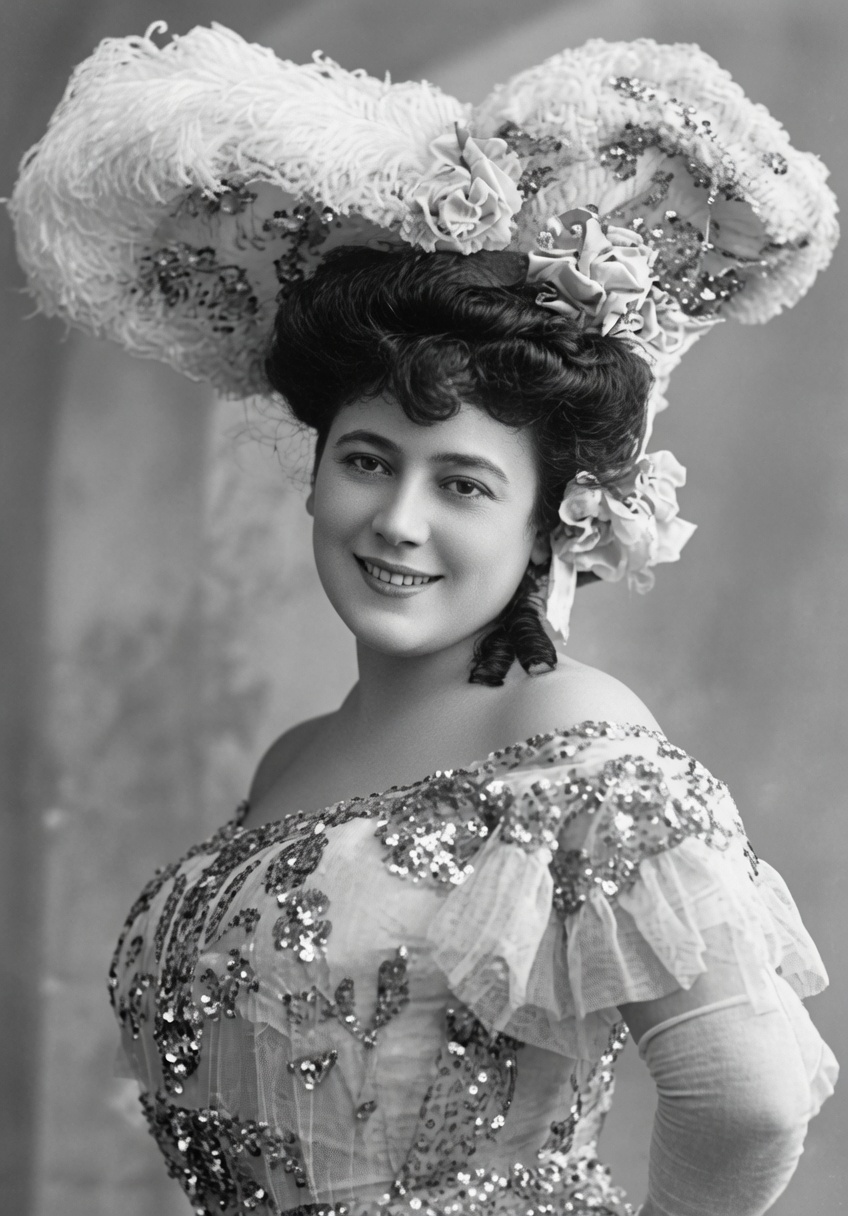
- Fábregas in the 1900s
- Born: Virginia Fábregas García; 17 December 1871; Yautepec de Zaragoza, Morelos, Mexico
- Died: 17 November 1950 (aged 78); Mexico City, Mexico
- Occupation: Actress
- Years active: 1931–45
- Spouse: Francisco Cardona
- Children: 3, including Manuel Sánchez-Navarro Fábregas
- Relatives: Fanny Schiller (daughter-in-law); Manolo Fábregas (grandson)

Virginia Fábregas García (17 December 1871 – 17 November 1950) was a Mexican stage and film actress active in the early 20th-Century. She appeared in films between 1931 and 1945.

== Personal life ==
Virginia Fábregas García was born on 17 December 1871 Oacalco, Yautepec, Morelos, Mexico. Her father was Ricardo Fábregas, originally from Spain, and her mother was Úrsula García. After her mother's death, she spent part of her childhood on the hacienda Apanquetzalco in Morelos, where the owner built a small theater for her. She attended the Normal school in Mexico City, graduating in 1896.

Virginia Fábregas died at the age of 79 in Mexico City, and on 18 November 1950 her remains were interred at the Rotunda of Illustrious Persons.

== Acting career ==
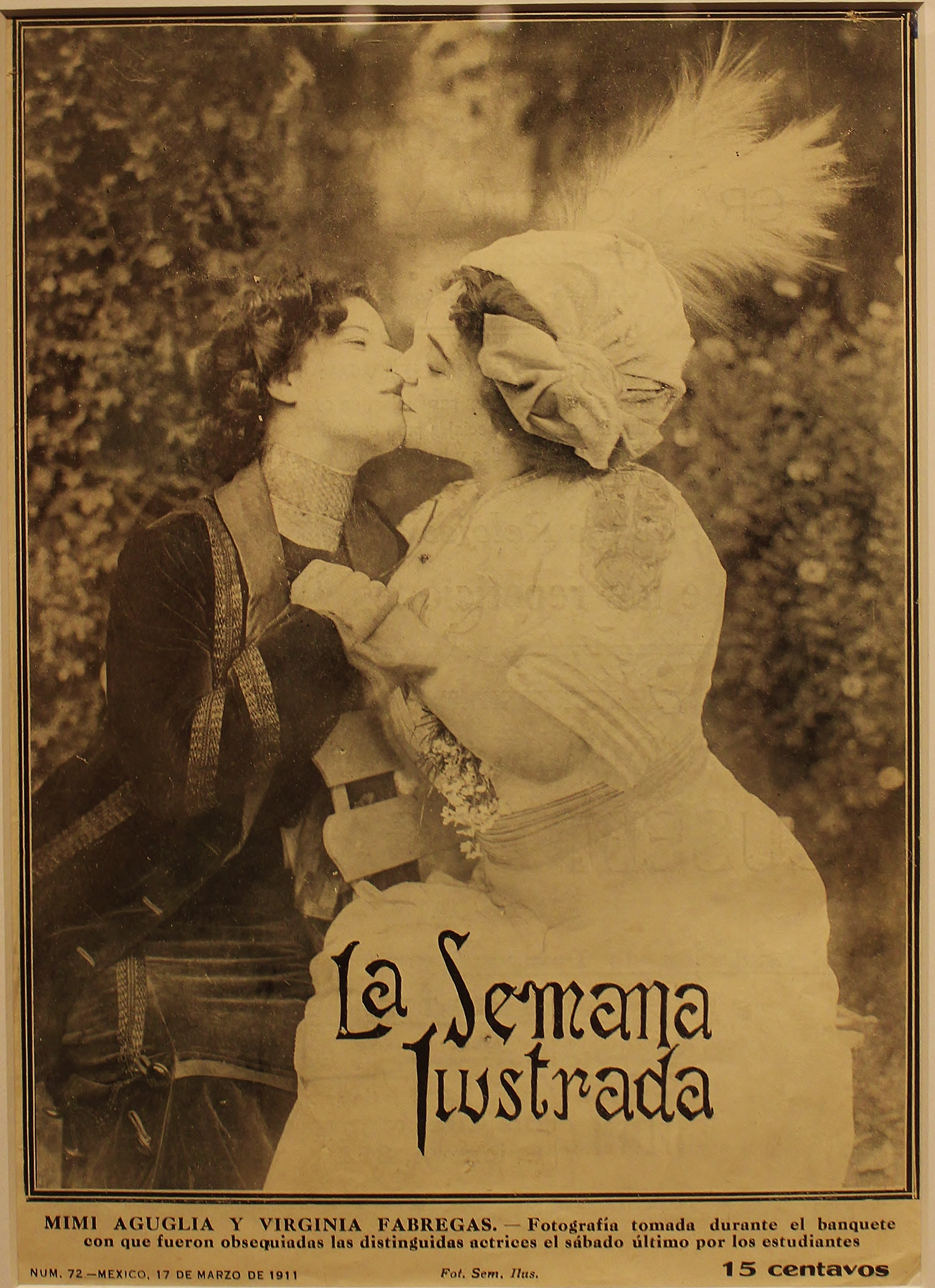
Italian actress Mimi Aguglia and Fábregas kissing in 1911

In 1891 Fábregas García participated in a benefit in the Teatro Nacional, attracting the attention of the actor Leopoldo Burón, who hired her for his theater company. Her professional debut was on 30 April 1892, at the age of 21, appearing in Divorciémonos by Victoriano Sardou. She soon became popular not only in Mexico but also in Latin America and Europe, and she became known as the "Mexican Sarah Bernhardt".

In 1895, she co-founded the Compañía Nacional de Drama y Comedia Fábregas-Montoya-Soler theater company. Mexican President Porfirio Díaz was in the audience when she inaugurated her theater in Mexico City.

She received the Palmas Académicas award in 1908.

== Filmography ==
Year	Title	Character
1931	La fruta amarga	Min
1934	La sangre manda	Doña Rosa
1938	Abnegación	
1939	Una luz en mi camino	Doña Catita
1941	El rápido de las 9.15	Susanita del Mercado
1945	La casa de la zorra	Señora Adriana / La zorra

== Family ==
She married actor and director Francisco Cardona on July 4, 1902. They had a daughter and two sons, including Manuel Sánchez-Navarro, who married actress Fanny Schiller.

Her grandson was the actor Manolo Fábregas.

== Legacy ==
A theater in Mexico City is named after her.

The National Association of Actors created the Virginia Fábregas Medal.

== See also ==
- List of people from Morelos
