= The Veiled Woman (1929 film) =

1929 film

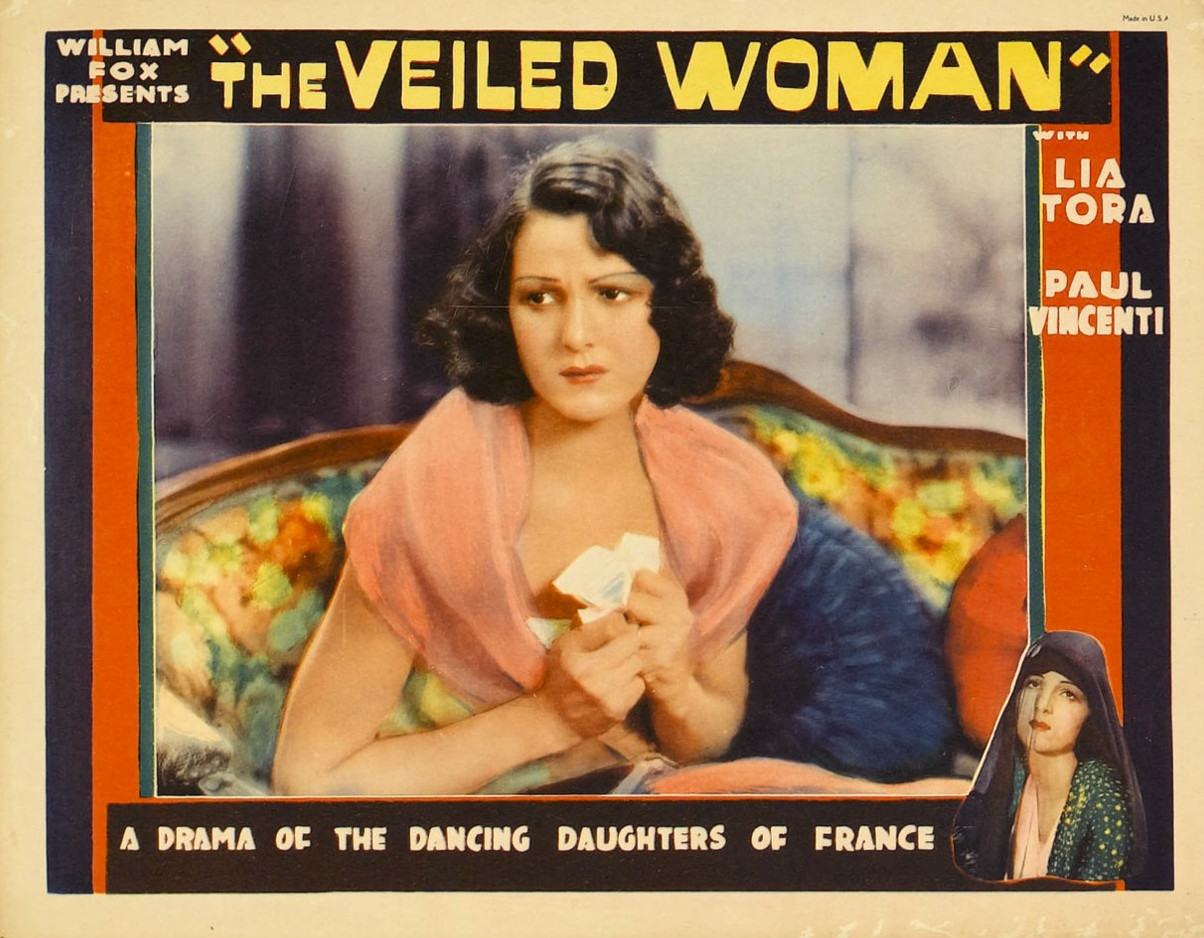
- Lobby card
- Directed by: Emmett J. Flynn
- Written by: Douglas Z. Doty
- Story by: Julio De Moraes; Lia Torá
- Starring: Lia Torá; Walter McGrail; Lupita Tovar; Bela Lugosi
- Cinematography: Charles G. Clarke
- Production company: Fox Film Corporation
- Distributed by: Fox Film Corporation
- Release date: April 14, 1929
- Running time: 58 minutes
- Country: United States
- Language: Sound (Synchronized) (English Intertitles)

The Veiled Woman is a 1929 American Synchronized sound drama film directed by Emmett J. Flynn and starring Lia Torá, Lupita Tovar, and Walter McGrail, also featuring Bela Lugosi. While the film has no audible dialog, it was released with a synchronized musical score with sound effects using the sound-on-film Movietone process. This film was initially advertised as being an All-Talking sound film, but at the last minute, the producer decided to film it as a synchronized sound film.

== Plot ==
As reviewed in a magazine, after saving her from a notorious rake in a dive in Montmartre, in a series of flashbacks Nanon who tells a virginal young woman stories of four men she knew in her past. The first man involves a seducer with a line similar to the one she just stopped. The second is Pierre, the owner of a gambling place who gives her a job as a roulette girl, but means right by her. The third is an Englishman on the make, whom she shoots in self defense and then flees. Nanon finally marries a well-to-do socialite of the suburbs, but, during one of her trips to the city, her husband discovers her unsavory past from talking to the first man and leaves her. On the way out of the dive with the young woman she has rescued, Nanon discovers that the taxi cab driver is Pierre, the former casino owner, who had sacrificed everything to coverup the shooting she committed.

== Cast ==
- Lia Torá as Nanon
- Paul Vincent as Pierre
- Walter McGrail as Diplomatic Attaché
- Josef Swickard as Col. De Selincourt
- Lupita Tovar as Young Girl
- Bela Lugosi as Nanon's murdered suitor
- Kenneth Thomson as Dr. Donald Ross
- André Cheron as Count De Bracchi
- Ivan Lebedeff as Capt. Paul Fevier
- Maude George as Countess De Bracchi

== See also ==
- List of early sound feature films (1926–1929)

== Bibliography ==
- Pancho Kohner. Lupita Tovar The Sweetheart of Mexico. Xlibris Corporation, 2011.
