= Lia Torá =

Brazilian dancer and actress

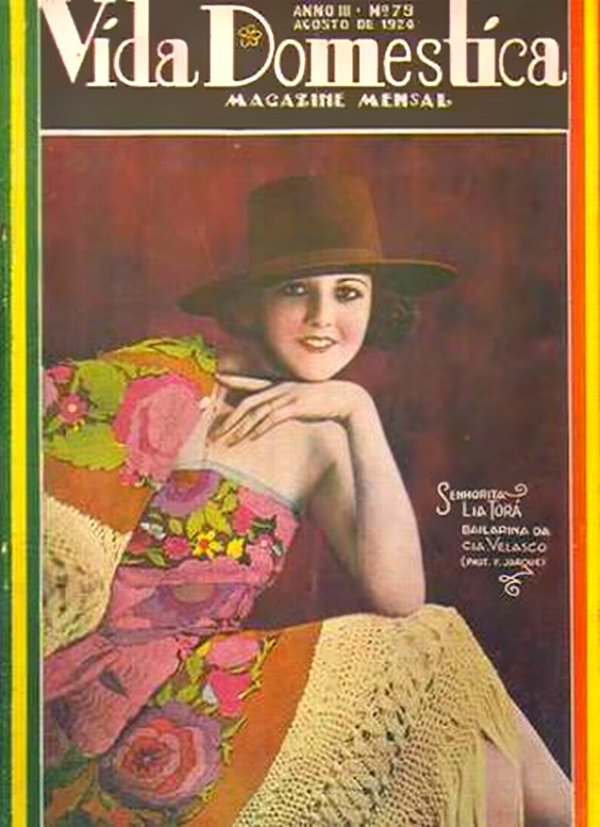
- A 1924 magazine cover
- Born: Horacia Correa D'Avila; 12 May 1903; Rio de Janeiro, Brazil
- Died: 27 May 1972 (aged 69); Rio de Janeiro, Brazil
- Occupation: Actress
- Years active: 1927–1971 (film)

Lia Torá (born Horacia Correa D'Avila; May 12, 1903 – May 27, 1972) was a Brazilian dancer and film actress.

== Filmography ==
Year	Title	Role	Notes
1927	The Low Necker	—N/a	
1929	The Veiled Woman	Nanon	
1929	Making the Grade	Another girlfriend	
1929	Mary, the Beautiful	—N/a	
1931	Hollywood, City of Dreams	Helen Gordon	
1931	There Were Thirteen	Sybil Conway	
1931	Don Juan Diplomatico	Rosario	
1932	Soñadores de Gloria	Rosario	
1932	Alma Camponesa	Young pretender	
1971	As Confissões de Frei Abóbora	Paula's mother	Final film role

== Bibliography ==
- Pancho Kohner. Lupita Tovar The Sweetheart of Mexico. Xlibris Corporation, 2011.
