= Ernesto Finance =

Mexican actor

Ernesto Finance Bravo
- Born: 15 January 1891; Puebla, Mexico
- Died: 16 February 1974 (aged 83); Guadalajara, Jalisco, Mexico
- Occupation: Actor
- Years active: 1919-1963 (film)

Ernesto Finance (15 January 1891 – 16 February 1974) was a Mexican stage and film actor.

== Selected filmography ==
- Por mis pistolas (1938)
- The Whip (1939)
- Simón Bolívar (1942)
- Corner Stop (1948)
- Music, Poetry and Madness (1948)
- The Magician (1949)
- Philip of Jesus (1949)
- The Fallen Angel (1949)
- A Gringo Girl in Mexico (1951)
- My Wife Is Not Mine (1951)
- The Atomic Fireman (1952)
- If I Were a Congressman (1952)
- A Tailored Gentleman (1954)
- Magdalena (1955)
- Drop the Curtain (1955)
- Spring in the Heart (1956)
- The Bandits of Cold River (1956)
- Comedians and Songs (1960)

== Bibliography ==
- Rogelio Agrasánchez. Guillermo Calles: A Biography of the Actor and Mexican Cinema Pioneer. McFarland, 2010.
