= Rogue of the Rio Grande =

1930 film by Spencer Gordon Bennet

- Directed by: Spencer Gordon Bennet
- Written by: Oliver Drake
- Produced by: Cliff P. Broughton
- Starring: José Bohr; Myrna Loy; Walter Miller
- Cinematography: Edward Snyder
- Edited by: Fred Bain
- Production company: Cliff Broughton Productions
- Distributed by: Sono Art-World Wide Pictures
- Release date: December 7, 1930
- Running time: 65 minutes
- Country: United States
- Language: English

Rogue of the Rio Grande is a 1930 American pre-Code musical comedy Western film directed by Spencer Gordon Bennet and starring José Bohr, Myrna Loy, and Walter Miller.

== Plot ==
El Malo robs the mayor of Sierra Blanca, Seth Landport (who is actually an outlaw) to help poor people and falls in love with Carmita, the entertainer at an inn. After capturing Seth following a stagecoach robbery, El Malo reveals that he is the Robin Hood-type robber, leading to his own arrest and the hatred of Carmita. A friend finally helps El Malo escape, and he takes Carmita with him.

== Cast ==
- José Bohr as El Malo
- Myrna Loy as Carmita
- Walter Miller as Sheriff Tex Rankin
- Carmelita Geraghty as Dolores
- Gene Morgan as Mayor Seth Landport
- Raymond Hatton as Pedro
- William P. Burt as Carmita's dance partner
- Florence Dudley as Big Bertha

== Reception ==
A review in Harrison's Reports described the film as "Just an ordinary western, with little to hold the interest." It added, "It cannot rate as anything higher than ordinary."
