= Milo Quesada =

Argentine actor

- Born: 16 April 1930; Buenos Aires, Argentina
- Died: 12 December 2012 (aged 82); Madrid, Spain
- Occupation: Actor
- Years active: 1954–ca.1995

Milo Quesada, born as Raúl García Alonso, (16 April 1930 – 12 December 2012) was an Argentine actor.

He started his career in Argentina with the movie Cristol de Hombres and other minor roles. He then moved to Spain, where his career expanded, and obtained several lead roles until the final years of the '70s.

He participated in over 70 movies, including the Italian horror anthology Black Sabbath directed by Mario Bava, where he played the killer in the first part.

Quesada died on 12 December 2012 in Madrid aged 82.

== Filmography ==
- Crisol de hombres (1954)
- Al sur del paralelo 42 (1955)
- Rosaura a las 10 (1958)
- Red Cross Girls (1958) – Hugo
- Diego Corrientes (1959) – Conde
- Un vaso de whisky (1959) – Rafael
- My Last Tango (1960) – Carlos Gardel
- Fuga desesperada (1961)
- Los cuervos (1961) – Chico en fiesta de Laura
- La mentira tiene cabellos rojos (1962) – Francisco Soto
- The Young Racers (1963) – Italian Driver
- The Girl Who Knew Too Much (1963) – De Vico / Paccini
- Black Sabbath (1963) – Frank Rainer (segment "Il telefono") (uncredited)
- El mujeriego (1964) – Mario
- El salario del crimen (1964) – Policía
- Saul e David (1964)
- Jandro (1965)
- Faites vos jeux, mesdames (1965)
- My Gun is the Law (1965) – Dave, O'Brien's Henchman
- Wild Kurdistan (1965) – Miralai (uncredited)
- The 10th Victim (1965) – Rudi
- Le solitaire passe à l'attaque (1966) – Brois
- Savage Pampas (1966) – Alfonso
- Django Does Not Forgive (1966)
- Long Days of Vengeance (1967)
- I'll Kill Him and Return Alone (1967) – Raul Alonso – Rustler Leader
- Django Kill... If You Live, Shoot! (1967) – Bill Templer
- The House of 1,000 Dolls (1967) – Man who wants to kill Manderville (uncredited)
- Red Blood, Yellow Gold (1967) – Tennessee Logan
- Un diablo bajo la almohada (1968) – Miguel
- The Mercenary (1968) – Marco (uncredited)
- Shoot Twice (1968) – Peter (uncredited)
- Rebus (1969) – Gonzalo
- Battle of the Last Panzer (1969) – Pierre, Jeanette's husband
- Un hombre solo (1969)
- A Talent for Loving (1969) – Don Patricio
- The Bloody Judge (1970) – Satchel
- El coleccionista de cadáveres (1970) – Shanghai
- Des vacances en or (1970)
- Chicas de club (1970) – Publicista
- Capitão Apache (1971)
- Dans la poussière du soleil (1972)
- El vikingo (1972) – Chófer de don Ramón
- Tragic Ceremony (1972) – Cop
- El chulo (1974)
- Los muertos, la carne y el diablo (1974)
- Yo soy Fulana de Tal (1975)
- El adúltero (1975)
- Ambitious (1976)
