= Una luz en mi camino =

- Directed by: José Bohr
- Starring: Narciso Busquets; Consuelo Frank; Virginia Fábregas; Pedro Armendáriz
- Release date: 1939
- Country: Mexico
- Language: Spanish

Una luz en mi camino is a 1939 Spanish-language Mexican drama film directed by José Bohr. It stars Narciso Busquets, Consuelo Frank, Virginia Fábregas and Pedro Armendáriz.
