= Light in the High Plains =

1953 film by Víctor Urruchúa

- Film poster
- Directed by: Víctor Urruchúa
- Written by: Guillermo Fuentes; Víctor Urruchúa
- Produced by: Luis Guillermo Villegas Blanco
- Starring: José Elías Moreno
- Cinematography: Ramiro Vega
- Edited by: Eduardo Serrano
- Release date: 1953
- Country: Venezuela
- Language: Spanish

Light in the High Plains (Spanish: Luz en el páramo) is a 1953 Venezuelan film directed by Víctor Urruchúa. It was entered into the 1953 Cannes Film Festival.

== Cast ==
- José Elías Moreno as Jose
- Carmen Montejo as Angela
- Hilda Vera as Julia
- Luis Salazar as Pedro Maria
- Ildemaro García
- Esteban Herrera as Arcadio
- Jorge Reyes as Zamarro
- Elvira Morla as Pastora
- David Peraza
- Gran Marcos

== Bibliography ==
- Darlene J. Sadlier. Latin American Melodrama: Passion, Pathos, and Entertainment. University of Illinois Press, 2009.
