= Captain Scarlett =

1953 film by Thomas Carr

- Directed by: Thomas Carr
- Written by: Howard Dimsdale
- Produced by: Howard Dimsdale
- Starring: Richard Greene; Leonora Amar
- Cinematography: Charles Carl Carvahal
- Edited by: Gloria Schoemann
- Music by: Elias Breeskin
- Color process: Technicolor
- Production company: Craftsman Productions
- Distributed by: United Artists
- Release date: September 12, 1953
- Running time: 75 minutes
- Country: United States
- Language: English

Captain Scarlett is a 1953 American historical adventure film directed by Thomas Carr, that was shot in Mexico as three episodes of a television pilot. The film is set in France following the fall of Napoleon, stars Richard Greene in the title role as a Robin Hood-type avenger and the Brazilian actress Leonora Amar in her final screen role.

== Plot ==
The full film

In post-Napoleonic France, the Duke of Corlaine reprimands Count Villiers because his Spanish fiancée, Princess Maria, has run away. When Maria's carriage is accosted by highwaymen, Captain Scarlett, a Frenchman returning from England, fends off the attackers. Villiers arrives shortly after and arrests the remaining highwayman, but is ungrateful to Scarlett. Scarlett later meets with his old friend the Friar, who warns him that the duke is appropriating property and ordering his guards to terrorize residents, who are imprisoned if they resist. Scarlett is uninterested until he learns that his own estate now belongs to Villiers. Scarlett later slips into the bedroom at the estate where Maria is being held. She boldly offers him money in exchange for helping her escape, but Scarlett insists on friendship as his only payment. However, Scarlett is captured and held in the dungeon with the highwayman, Pierre du Cloux. Pierre and Scarlett form an immediate friendship when Pierre explains that he was forced into his new "trade" after his family's estate was confiscated by the duke. Scarlett and Pierre outwit their guard and escape under cover of the wedding festivities for Maria's and Villiers' arranged marriage. Before leaving the estate, Scarlett rescues Maria. They then ride to a safe encampment where Pierre's friends help lead the pursuing guards astray. Villiers spots the imposter as the hood flies off the head of the rider pretending to be Maria, rides back, finds the camp, and duels with Scarlett until his own death. After Maria exchanges her wedding dress for men's clothing, she happily agrees to ride with Scarlett and Pierre rather than return home to face another arranged marriage.

The partners then patrol the countryside, coming to the aid of peasants who are being robbed or arrested by the duke's guards. A frustrated duke offers Scarlett's estate to his friend, Etienne Dumas, if he succeeds in killing the outlaw. Etienne disguises himself as a peasant and arranges with the head of the guards to bait Scarlett with a mock execution. The next day, Etienne is saved from the executioner's blade as expected by Maria, Pierre and Scarlett. Etienne then convinces the three friends to allow him to join them. That night, the Friar brings Scarlett a message to visit Josephine, a farm woman whom Scarlett and his friends saved from tax collectors. To help Scarlett avoid a potential trap, Etienne volunteers to go in his place. Once there, however, Etienne takes advantage of Josephine's attraction to Scarlett by telling her that the captain has rebuffed her. He then gives her a pouch of gold coins to buy her cooperation in a secret plan to entrap Scarlett. Unaware of Etienne's duplicity, Scarlett accompanies him back to the farmhouse. Later, at Etienne's signal, Josephine steps outside. He then plunges his sword through an open window into what he believes is Scarlett's back, but is only his empty red cloak. Scarlett, his suspicions having been aroused by the impoverished Josephine's lavish meal, engages Etienne in a duel, which ends with Etienne's death. Maria and Pierre, meanwhile, grow uneasy at their friend's long absence and ride to the farmhouse in time to help Scarlett fend off the guards and a jealous Maria punishes Josephine.

The next day, the three friends continue their mission and overwhelm a greedy guard at a toll road. During the ensuing chase, Maria falls from her horse and is captured. The duke then posts public notices that Maria will be executed the next morning unless Scarlett and Pierre surrender. The duke expects a rescue attempt and anticipates the outlaws' tactics. Nevertheless, they outwit his guards and gain access to his house. While Pierre duels with several guards, Scarlett confronts the duke, who has Maria bound to a chair. When a guard emerges from hiding and holds a knife to Maria's throat, Scarlett releases the duke. However, Maria bites the guard's hand, forcing him within range of Scarlett's sword, with which he disables the guard. Scarlett then kills the duke in a duel and frees Maria, who rewards him with a passionate kiss. The three friends then ride away.

== Cast ==
- Richard Greene as Capt. Carlos Scarlett
- Leonora Amar as Princess Maria
- Nedrick Young as Pierre DuCloux
- Manuel Fábregas as The Duke de Corlaine
- Eduardo Noriega as Count Villiers
- Carlos Múzquiz as Etienne Dumas
- Isabel del Puerto as Josephine Prenez
- George Treviño as The Friar
