= Making the Grade (1929 film) =

1929 film

- Directed by: Alfred E. Green
- Written by: George Ade; Malcolm Stuart Boylan; Harry Brand; Edward Kaufman
- Starring: Lois Moran; Edmund Lowe; Lucien Littlefield
- Cinematography: Norman Devol; L. William O'Connell
- Edited by: J. Edwin Robbins
- Music by: Erno Rapee
- Production company: Fox Film Corporation
- Distributed by: Fox Film Corporation
- Release date: February 17, 1929
- Running time: 60 minutes
- Country: United States
- Languages: Sound (Part-Talkie); English Intertitles

Making the Grade is a 1929 sound part-talkie American Pre-Code comedy film directed by Alfred E. Green. In addition to sequences with audible dialogue or talking sequences, the film features a synchronized musical score and sound effects along with English intertitles. The soundtrack was recorded using the Movietone sound-on-film system. The film stars Lois Moran, Edmund Lowe and Lucien Littlefield.

== Cast ==
- Lois Moran as Lettie Ewing
- Edmund Lowe as Herbert Littell Dodsworth
- Lucien Littlefield as Silas Cooper
- James Ford as Bud Davison
- Rolfe Sedan as Valet
- John Alden as Egbert Williamson
- Sherman Ross as Arthur Burdette
- Gino Conti as Frank Dinwiddie
- Lia Torá as Another Girl Friend

== Preservation ==
- Lobster Films holds a copy of the film.

== See also ==
- List of early sound feature films (1926–1929)

== Bibliography ==
- Solomon, Aubrey. The Fox Film Corporation, 1915-1935: A History and Filmography. McFarland, 2011.
