= Eva Limiñana =

Argentine-Chilean screenwriter and pianist (1895–1953)

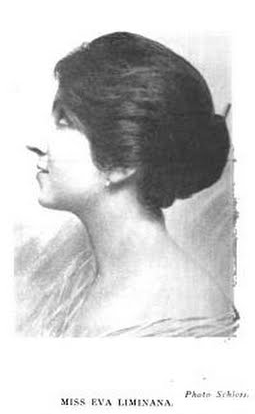
Eva Limiñana, from a 1917 publication.

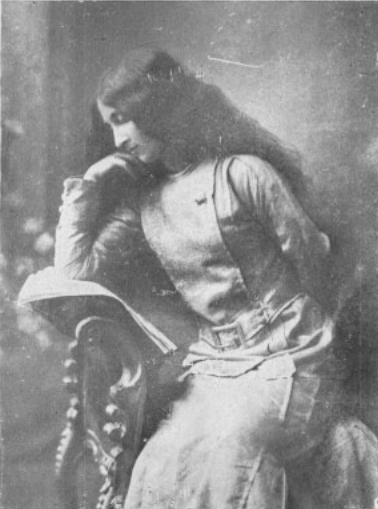
Eva Limiñana as a student, from a 1911 publication.

Eva Limiñana (December 22, 1895 – September 27, 1953), sometimes credited as La Duquesa Olga, was a pianist, screenwriter, and filmmaker born in Argentina and educated in Chile.

== Early life ==
Eva Limiñana Salaverri was born in Gualeguaychú, Entre Ríos, Argentina, and raised in Chile. Her mother was Marie de Limiñana. She studied piano at the Santiago Conservatory of Music, with further studies in Berlin with Martin Krause and (when World War I began) in New York with Teresa Carreño.

== Career ==
Limiñana performed in New York as a pianist in 1917, 1919, and 1920. Through the 1920s she played and recorded with Orquesta Criolla Argentina. In 1931 she made several musical recordings providing piano accompaniment for her husband, singer José Bohr. She also wrote songs with Bohr.

Limiñana wrote eight films: La sangre manda (1934), ¿Quién mató a Eva? (1934), Tu hijo (1935), Luponini from Chicago (1935), Por mis pistolas (1938), Una luz en mi camino (1939), Herencia macabra (1940). She wrote and produced all of these films in Mexico with José Bohr, who also starred and directed. She was credited as "La Duquesa Olga". She also produced Sueños de amor (1935), Marihuana (El monstruo verde) (1936), Such Is Woman (1936), and El látigo (1939) with him. Their films are described by a recent film historian as "disconcerting, horrifying, chaotic, extravagant, baroque, and confusing".

In 1942, after the couple divorced, she wrote, directed, and produced her only film without Bohr, Mi lupe y mi caballo (1944). After that, she retired from filmmaking.

== Personal life ==
Limiñana married German-born filmmaker and composer José Bohr (1901-1994) in 1925. She died in 1953, in Mexico City, aged 57 years.
