= A Family Like Many Others =

1949 film directed by Alejandro Galindo

- Directed by: Alejandro Galindo
- Written by: Alejandro Galindo
- Produced by: César Santos Galindo
- Starring: Fernando Soler; David Silva; Martha Roth
- Cinematography: José Ortiz Ramos
- Edited by: Carlos Savage
- Music by: Raúl Lavista
- Production company: Producciones Azteca
- Distributed by: Clasa-Mohme
- Release date: 11 March 1949
- Running time: 130 minutes
- Country: Mexico
- Language: Spanish

A Family Like Many Others (Spanish: Una familia de tantas) is a 1949 Mexican drama film written and directed by Alejandro Galindo and starring Fernando Soler, David Silva and Martha Roth. It was shot at the Azteca Studios in Mexico City. The film's sets were designed by the art director Gunther Gerszo.

== Synopsis ==
A domineering father's control over his family weakens when a charming salesman comes to the house.

== Cast ==
- Fernando Soler as Rodrigo Cataño
- David Silva as Roberto del Hierro
- Martha Roth as Maru Cataño
- Carlos Riquelme as Ricardo
- Eugenia Galindo as doña Gracia Cataño
- Enriqueta Reza as Guadalupe - sirvienta
- Felipe de Alba as Héctor Cataño
- Nora Veryán as Pilar - novia de Héctor
- Isabel del Puerto as Estela Cataño
- Manuel de la Vega as Leopoldo
- Alma Delia Fuentes as Lupita Cataño
- Conchita Gentil Arcos as Invitada a fiesta
- María Gentil Arcos as Invitada a fiesta
- Maruja Grifell as Madre de Roberto
- Jorge Martínez de Hoyos as Anunciador
- Ignacio Peón as Invitado a fiesta
- Victoria Sastre

== Bibliography ==
- R. Hernandez-Rodriguez. Splendors of Latin Cinema. ABC-CLIO, 2009.
