= The Whip (1939 film) =

- Directed by: José Bohr
- Written by: José Bohr
- Produced by: José Bohr
- Starring: José Bohr; Elena D'Orgaz; Domingo Soler
- Edited by: José Bohr
- Music by: José Bohr
- Production company: Producciones Duquesa Olga
- Release date: 28 October 1939
- Running time: 74 minutes
- Country: Mexico
- Language: Spanish

The Whip (Spanish:El látigo) is a 1939 Mexican adventure film directed by and starring José Bohr. It also featured Elena D'Orgaz, Domingo Soler.

== Cast ==
- José Bohr as Rafael - El Látigo
- Elena D'Orgaz as Carmelita
- Domingo Soler as Tío Antonio
- Julián Soler as Andrés
- Aurora Walker as Rosalía
- Ernesto Finance as Don Fernando Montero
- Guillermo Cantú Robert as Raúl Montero
- Carlos López Moctezuma as Antonio
- Pepe del Río as Raúl - niño
- Consuelo Lezama as Doña Enriqueta
- Mary Darson as Rosa

== Bibliography ==
- Toledo, Nelson. Patagonia Y Antartica, Personajes HistóRicos. Palibrio, 2011.
