= Borrasca humana =

- Starring: Carlos Orellana
- Release date: 1940
- Country: Mexico
- Language: Spanish

Borrasca humana (English: Human Storm) is a 1940 Mexican film. It stars Carlos Orellana and José Bohr, who also directed the film.

== Cast ==
- Julio Ahuet
- Crox Alvarado
- José Bohr
- Elena D'Orgaz
- Lucy Delgado
- Tito Novaro
- Carlos Orellana
- Armando Velasco
