= One Who's Been a Sailor =

- Chilean theatrical release poster
- Directed by: José Bohr
- Written by: René Olivares; Eugenio Retes
- Produced by: José Bohr
- Cinematography: Andrés Martorell De Llanza
- Music by: José Bohr; Donato Román Heitman
- Release date: 1951
- Running time: 85 minutes
- Country: Chile
- Language: Spanish

One Who's Been a Sailor (Spanish: Uno que ha sido marino) is a 1951 Chilean comedy film directed by José Bohr and starring Eugenio Retes, Hilda Sour and Arturo Gatica.

== Plot ==
Two shoe shiners and a newspaper vendor survive under the bridges of the Mapocho River in Santiago. Maruja, the newspaper vendor, begins a relationship with a businessman who helps her become a famous singer. Meanwhile, the two shoe shiners come across money from a bank robbery by chance, which changes their luck.

== Cast ==
- Eugenio Retes as Zepeda
- Hilda Sour as Maruja
- Arturo Gatica as Silvano
- Eduardo Naveda
- Eva González
- Rolando Caicedo
- Elena Moreno
- Arturo Gonzalvez

== Bibliography ==
- Carlos Ossa Coo. Historia del cine chileno. Empresa Editora Nacional Quimantú, 1971.
