= Francisco Martínez Soria =

Spanish actor (1902–1982)

Paco Martínez Soria
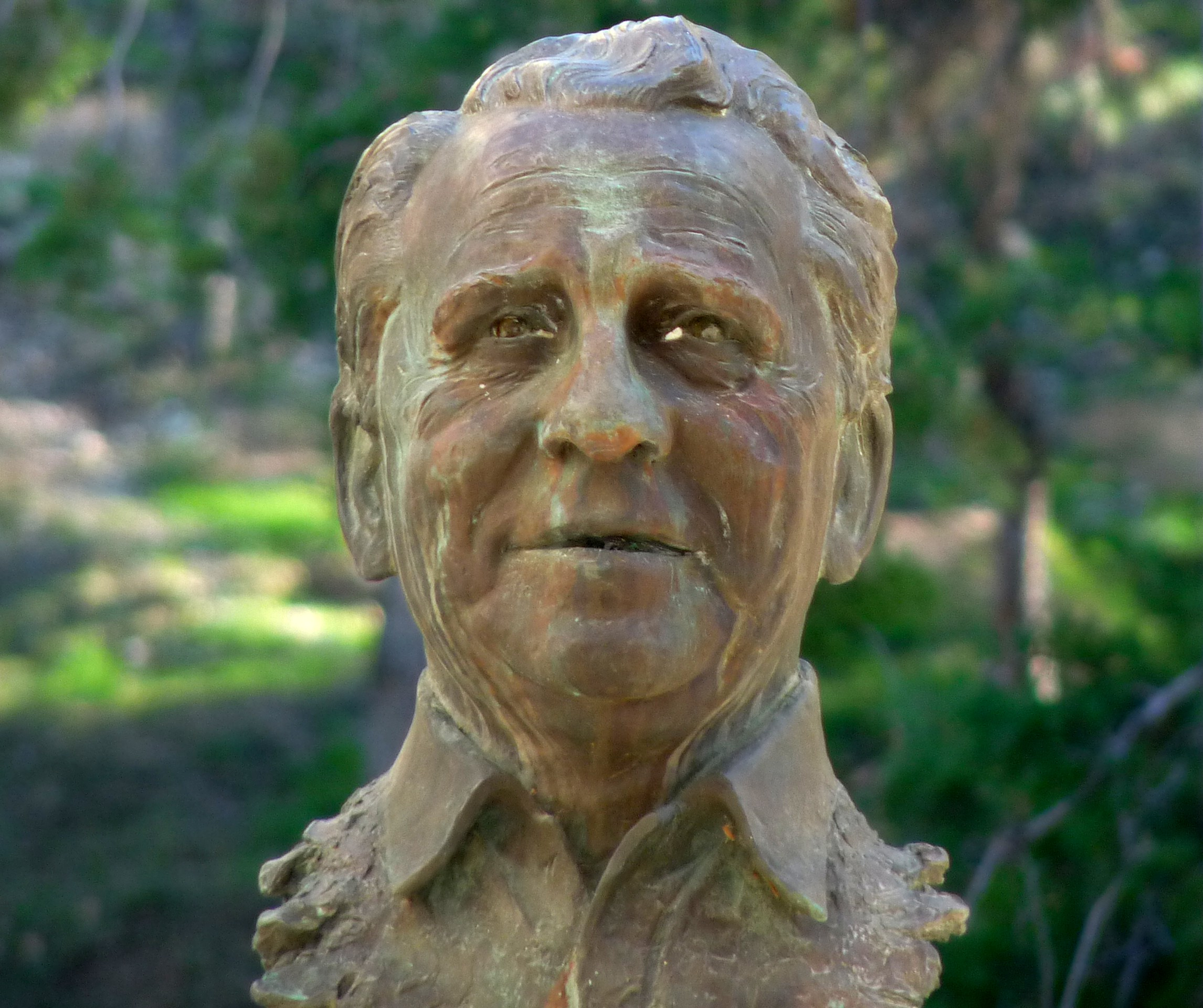
- Bust of Paco Martínez Soria in Zaragoza
- Born: Francisco Martínez Soria; December 18, 1902; Tarazona (Zaragoza), Spain
- Died: February 26, 1982 (aged 79); Madrid, Spain
- Occupations: Actor, Theatre director
- Website: http://www.donpacomartinezsoria.com

Francisco Martínez Soria (December 18, 1902 – February 26, 1982) better known as Paco Martínez Soria was a Spanish actor. He was born in Tarazona, Zaragoza, Aragon.

== Biography ==
Martínez Soria was born in Tarazona in 1902. At the age of five he moved to Barcelona with his family, and he was educated in that city at the Colegio de los Salesianos. He worked as a clerk and then as a salesperson. At the same time he participated in performances of local theatre groups in Gràcia.

During the Spanish Civil War he left his work and focused on theatre as an amateur actor. In 1938 he debuted in Teatro Fontalba with the theatre company of Rafael López Somoza with the work Antonio pasó el infierno (Antonio goes to hell). Two years later he founded his own theatre company with which he worked during the 1940s from Teatro Urquinaona and in the 1950s from Talía theatre.

In 1934 he collaborated as an extra in the black and white comedy Sereno with director Ignacio F. Iquino. He continued working with Iquino in eleven more films. He got his first leading role in 1938 in the comedy Paquete, el fotógrafo público número uno (Paquete, the number one public photographer). He continued playing supporting roles in many films until 1944 when he returned to theatre as an actor and entrepreneur.

His name achieved some fame between 1942 and 1944, when he was named director and first actor in the theatre company of Teatro de la Zarzuela.

He returned to cinema in the rolesstudd in 1950s. In 1966 he was very successful with the film La ciudad no es para mí (The city is not for me) directed by Pedro Lazaga; a work which greatly increased his fame and made him a household name in Spain. From that moment on, his screen character as an affectionate country bumpkin did not cease to appear in films until his death with his friend Pedro Lazaga.

Martínez Soria died in Madrid on February 26, 1982.

== Filmography ==
Film
| Year | Title | Role | Notes |
|---|---|---|---|
| 1933 | La Llorona | Don Fernando de Moncada | |
| 1934 | Sereno... y tormenta | unknown | |
| 1935 | Al margen de la ley | unknown | |
| 1935 | Error judicial | | |
| 1937 | Diego Corrientes | | |
| 1938 | Heart of Gold | Saturiano | |
| 1938 | Por mis pistolas | | |
| 1941 | El difunto es un vivo | | |
| 1942 | Boda accidentada | | |
| 1943 | Deliciosamente tontos | | |
| 1943 | El hombre de los muñecos | | |
| 1943 | Piruetas juveniles | | |
| 1943 | Un enredo de familia | | |
| 1943 | Viviendo al revés | | |
| 1943 | The Rock of Souls | | |
| 1944 | Saint Francis of Assisi | | |
| 1944 | My Memories of Mexico | | |
| 1949 | Midnight | Señor boticario | |
| 1949 | The Magician | Doctor (uncredited) | |
| 1950 | Sobre las olas | Invitado en fiesta de palacio | |
| 1951 | Almas en peligro | | |
| 1951 | The Dance of the Heart | Jaime Miravall | |
| 1953 | Fantasía española | Suave | |
| 1953 | Lawless Mountain | | |
| 1956 | El difunto es un vivo | | |
| 1956 | Veraneo en España | | |
| 1957 | Su desconsolada esposa | | |
| 1959 | Sendas marcadas | | |
| 1966 | La ciudad no es para mí | Agustín Valverde | |
| 1967 | ¿Qué hacemos con los hijos? | | |
| 1968 | El turismo es un gran invento | Mayor Benito Requejo | |
| 1969 | Se armó el belén | Parish priest | |
| 1969 | Abuelo made in Spain | | |
| 1969 | Don erre que erre | | |
| 1971 | Hay que educar a papá | | |
| 1972 | El padre de la criatura | | |
| 1973 | El abuelo tiene un plan | | |
| 1974 | El calzonazos | | |
| 1975 | El alegre divorciado | | |
| 1976 | Estoy hecho un chaval | | |
| 1977 | Vaya par de gemelos | Twins Lucas and Pedro | |
| 1980 | Es peligroso casarse a los 60 | Mariano | |
| 1981 | La tía de Carlos | Fermín Recuero / Charley's Aunt | |
