= El gran circo Chamorro =

- film poster
- Directed by: José Bohr
- Written by: Eugenio Retes
- Produced by: José Bohr
- Cinematography: Andrés Martorell De Llanza
- Music by: José Bohr
- Release date: 1955
- Running time: 107 minutes
- Country: Chile
- Language: Spanish

The Big Chamorro Circus (Spanish: El gran circo Chamorro) is a 1955 Chilean comedy film directed by José Bohr and starring Eugenio Retes and Malú Gatica.

== Plot ==
The story revolves around the life of Euríspides Chamorro (Retes), who worked various roles in a circus, including ticket-taker and clown, to finance his son Fernando's (Guixé) medical studies. One day, he receives a telegram informing him that his son had completed his degree. Proud of his son's achievement, Euríspides travels to Santiago to find him, but is devastated to discover that Fernando had dropped out of college years ago and was spending his nights at a boîte in the capital. Additionally, the telegram was a lie invented by one of Euríspides' employees to steal the circus from him. Despite the setbacks, Euríspides is determined to get back on his feet and reclaim the circus. He takes on various jobs, but with mixed results. Throughout it all, however, he maintains his Chilean charm and humor, entertaining with jokes and well-crafted musical scenes.

== Cast ==
- Eugenio Retes as Euríspides Chamorro
- Pepe Guixé as Fernando Chamorro
- Elsa Villa
- Gerardo Grez
- Malú Gatica as Margarita Mendizabal
