= Isabelita Blanch =

Spanish-Mexican actor

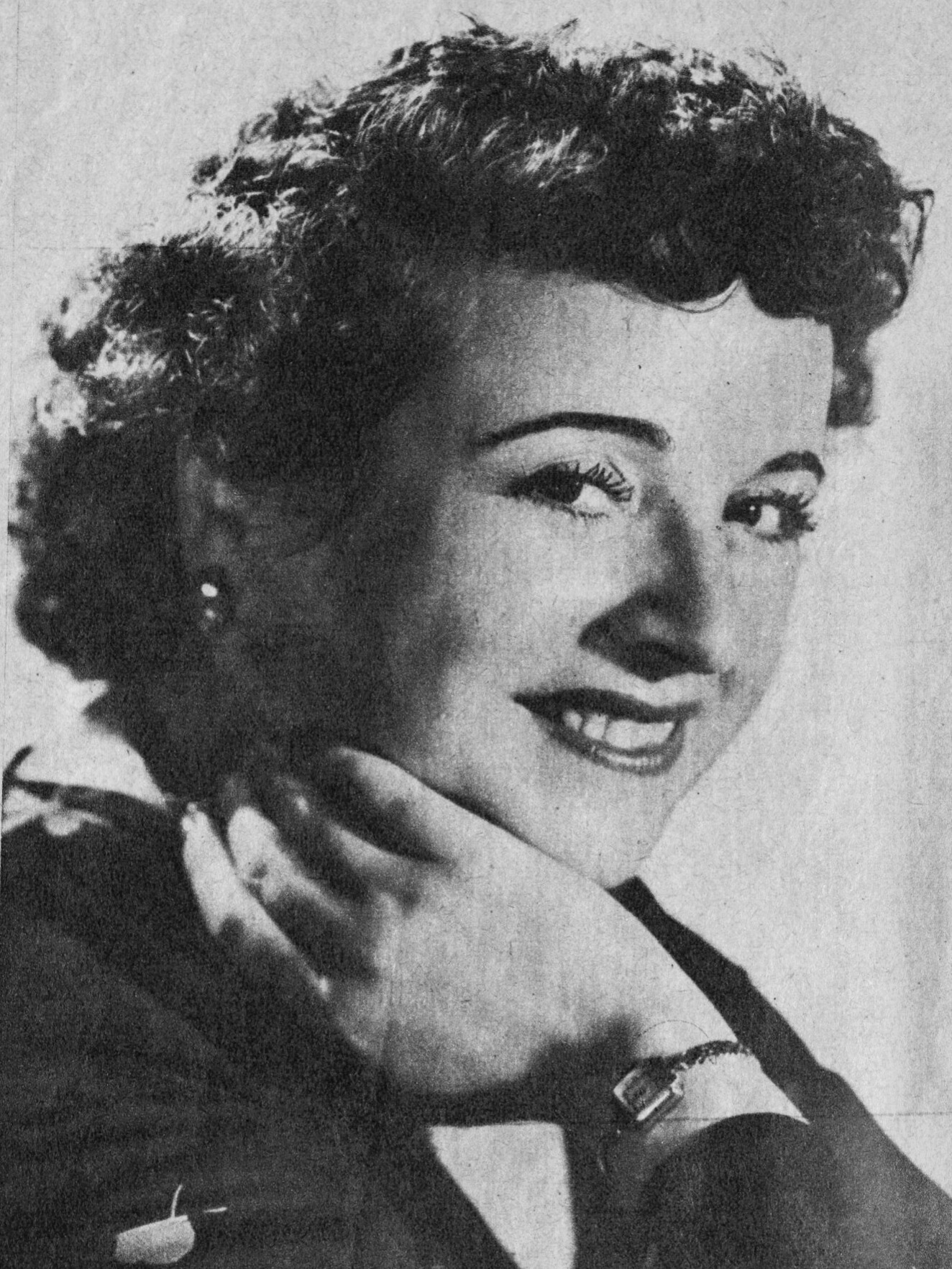
- Blanch in 1954
- Born: Isabelita Blanch Ruiz; 13 November 1906; Sagunto, Valencia, Spain
- Died: 14 May 1985 (aged 78); Mexico City, Mexico
- Occupation: actress
- Years active: 1930s–1970s
- Known for: vaudeville

Isabelita Blanch Ruiz (13 November 1906 – 14 May 1985) was a Spanish-born Mexican actress who specialized in vaudeville and comedy during the Golden Age of Mexican cinema. She and her sister Anita Blanch opened theater companies and performed throughout Mexico and in the United States. She also acted in movies and performed in one television series.

== Biography ==
Isabelita Blanch Ruiz was born 13 November 1906 in Valencia, Spain. She and her sister Ana, who went by the name of Anita Blanch, both had interest in the theater and arrived in Mexico in the 1920s. Primarily a vaudeville entertainer, Blanch specialized in comedy and melodrama.

She and her sister formed the Compañía de Teatro Anita Blanch (Anita Blanch Theater Company), hiring artists like Angel Garasa, Rafael Banquells, and Jose Cibrian, among others. In the 1940s, they produced plays like “No hables mal de os gitanos” by Enrique Bohorques; “La mujer legitima” by Xavier Villaurrutia; “Doña hormiga” by Alvarez Quintero; “El amor las vuelve locas” by Enrique Suarez, and many other productions.

Isabelita also had her own touring company, Compañía de Isabelita Blanch, which in 1940 made the inaugural performance in the restored Teatro Principal de Puebla, oldest theater in Mexico, with the presentation of the work "Quién te quiere a ti". In 1943, she toured in the United States, playing venues in Tucson, Arizona.

Blanch also performed in several movies including “Luponini de Chicago” (1935) by Jose Bohr, “Casa de mujeres” and "La historia de siete pecadoras" (1942) by Gabriel Soria and “Con la música por dentro" (1946) by Gómez Landero, and "Los secretos del sexo débil" (1960). She was also the star of a television program called "El profesor particular".

She died in Mexico City on 14 May 1985.

== Selected filmography ==
- Luponini from Chicago (1935)
- The Gay Senorita (1945)
- Music Inside (1947)
