= Saint Francis of Assisi (film) =

1944 film by Alberto Gout Àbrego

- Directed by: Alberto Gout
- Written by: Juan Antonio Vargas; Luis White Morquecho
- Produced by: Pedro A. Calderón
- Starring: José Luis Jiménez; Alicia de Phillips; Antonio Bravo
- Cinematography: Alex Phillips
- Edited by: Mario González
- Music by: Joaquín Estrada; Mario Ruiz Armengol
- Release date: 8 January 1944
- Running time: 119 minutes
- Country: Mexico
- Language: Spanish

Saint Francis of Assisi (Spanish:San Francisco de Asís) is a 1944 Mexican historical drama film directed by Alberto Gout and starring José Luis Jiménez, Alicia de Phillips and Antonio Bravo. It portrays the life of the Italian Saint Francis of Assisi.

The film's sets were designed by the art director Manuel Fontanals.

== Cast ==
- José Luis Jiménez
- Alicia de Phillips
- Antonio Bravo
- Carmen Molina
- Crox Alvarado
- Elena D'Orgaz
- Luis Alcoriza
- Arturo Soto Rangel
- Agustín Sen
- Elia Ortiz
- Roberto Cañedo
- Emilio Brillas
- Salvador Quiroz
- Ángel T. Sala
- Manuel Noriega
- Conchita Gentil Arcos
- Pepe Ruiz Vélez
- Fernando Curiel
- Francisco Pando
- Manuel Pozos
- Paco Martinez
- Humberto Rodríguez
- María Gentil Arcos
- Leonor de Martorel
- Ana Sáenz
- Carmen Cortés
- José Arratia
- Alberto A. Ferrer
- Jorge Arriaga
- María Marcos

== Bibliography ==
- Daniel Biltereyst & Daniela Treveri Gennari. Moralizing Cinema: Film, Catholicism, and Power. Routledge, 2014.
