= Zorina (film) =

- Directed by: Juan José Ortega
- Written by: Manuel R. Ojeda; Ramón Pérez Peláez; Yolanda Vargas Dulché
- Produced by: Juan José Ortega
- Starring: Rafael Baledón; Leonora Amar; Luis Aldás
- Cinematography: Ezequiel Carrasco
- Edited by: Rafael Ceballos
- Music by: Raúl Lavista
- Production company: Compañía Cinematográfica Mexicana
- Release date: 14 September 1949
- Country: Mexico
- Language: Spanish

Zorina is a 1949 Mexican drama film directed by Juan José Ortega and starring Rafael Baledón, Leonora Amar and Luis Aldás.

== Cast ==
- Rafael Baledón as Teniente Javier Escandón
- Leonora Amar as Zorina
- Luis Aldás as Bardo
- Patricia Morán as Rosa María
- Dalia Íñiguez as Constanza
- José Pulido as Arturo
- Manuel R. Ojeda as General Rovira
- Luz Alba as Palmira
- Eduardo Casado as Coronel Márquez
- Carlos Villarías as Coronel Lemus
- José Torvay as Sargento Rojas
- Juan Pulido as Andrés del Villar
- Emma Fink as Mariana
- Ángel Di Stefani as Patriarca
- Manuel Casanueva as Yanlío
- Hernán Vera as Tabernero
- Karol Vaida
- Jorge Arriaga as Maleante
- Lidia Franco as Doña Gorgonia
- Amelia Robert as Gitana

== Bibliography ==
- Rogelio Agrasánchez. Beauties of Mexican Cinema. Agrasanchez Film Archive, 2001.
