= Luponini from Chicago =

1935 film by José Bohr

- Directed by: José Bohr
- Written by: Eva Limiñana; José Bohr
- Produced by: Eva Limiñana; José Bohr
- Starring: José Bohr; Anita Blanch; Carlos Villatoro; Isabelita Blanch
- Cinematography: Ross Fisher; Alex Phillips
- Edited by: Juan José Marino
- Music by: José Bohr
- Production company: Producciones Duquesa Olga
- Release date: 11 September 1935
- Running time: 79 minutes
- Country: Mexico
- Language: Spanish

Luponini from Chicago (Spanish:Luponini de Chicago) is a 1935 Mexican comedy crime film directed by and starring José Bohr. It also features Anita Blanch, Carlos Villatoro and Isabelita Blanch.

== Cast ==
- José Bohr as Luponini
- Anita Blanch as Luisa Benitez
- Carlos Villatoro as Chato
- Isabelita Blanch as Isabel
- Maruja Gómez as Maravilla
- Raúl Talán as Colibri
- Manuel Buendía as Dominguez, policia
- Arturo Manrique as Moreno, policia
- Jorge Trevino as Montes, policia
- Paco Martínez as Padre de Luponini
- Godofredo de Velasco as Juan Orlando
- Consuelo Segarra as Sra. Benitez

== Bibliography ==
- Daniel Balderston, Mike Gonzalez & Ana M. Lopez. Encyclopedia of Contemporary Latin American and Caribbean Cultures. Routledge, 2002.
