= The Marble Colossus =

1929 film

- Directed by: Manuel R. Ojeda
- Written by: Gregorio Lopez y Fuentes; Manuel R. Ojeda
- Cinematography: Ezequiel Carrasco
- Release date: 20 April 1929
- Country: Mexico
- Languages: Silent; Spanish intertitles

The Marble Colossus (Spanish:El coloso de mármol) is a 1929 Mexican silent drama film directed by Manuel R. Ojeda and starring Ojeda, Anita Ruiz and Carlos Villatoro.

== Cast ==
- Manuel R. Ojeda
- Anita Ruiz
- Carlos Villatoro

== Bibliography ==
- Federico Dávalos Orozco & Esperanza Vázquez Bernal. Filmografía General Del Cine Mexicano, 1906-1931. Universidad Autónoma de Puebla, 1985.
