= Dreams of Love (1935 Mexican film) =

- Directed by: José Bohr
- Written by: José Bohr
- Produced by: José Bohr
- Starring: Claudio Arrau; Julieta Palavicini; Consuelo Frank; Elena D'Orgaz
- Edited by: José Bohr
- Production company: Producciones Duquesa Olga
- Release date: 4 April 1935
- Country: Mexico
- Language: Spanish

Dreams of Love (Spanish: Sueño de amor) is a 1935 Mexican historical drama film directed by José Bohr and starring Claudio Arrau, Julieta Palavicini and Consuelo Frank. The film portrays the life of the composer Franz Liszt, in particular his relationship with George Sand.

== Cast ==
- Claudio Arrau as Franz Liszt
- Julieta Palavicini as George Sand
- Consuelo Frank as Countess Marie D'Agoult
- Elena D'Orgaz as Carolina
- Josefina Escobedo as Carolyne zu Sayn-Wittgenstein
- Carlos Villatoro as Alfred de Musset
- Manuel Buendía as Príncipe
- Godofredo de Velasco as Comte d'Agoult
- Pilar Mata
- Irene Obermayer
- Carmen Conde

== Bibliography ==
- Toledo, Nelson. Patagonia Y Antartica, Personajes Históricos. Palibrio, 2011.
