= The Golden Christ =

1926 film

- El Cristo de oro
- Directed by: Manuel R. Ojeda
- Screenplay by: Luis Gonzalez Obregon; Manuel R. Ojeda; Basilio Zubiaur
- Produced by: Eduardo V. Jara; Manuel R. Ojeda
- Starring: Otilia Zambrano; Fanny Schiller
- Cinematography: Eugenio Lezama
- Release date: 21 October 1926 (Mexico)

The Golden Christ (Spanish:El Cristo de oro) is a 1926 silent Mexican film directed by Manuel R. Ojeda. It stars Otilia Zambrano, Fanny Schiller, Mary Barquin, Lucila de Alva and Silvia Loya.
