= Conspiracy (1927 film) =

1927 film

- Directed by: Manuel R. Ojeda
- Written by: Guillermo Maya; Manuel R. Ojeda
- Produced by: Manuel R. Ojeda
- Cinematography: Eugenio Lezama
- Production company: Promex
- Release date: 3 November 1927
- Country: Mexico
- Languages: Silent; Spanish intertitles

Conspiracy (Spanish:Conspiración) is a 1927 Mexican silent drama film directed by Manuel R. Ojeda.

== Cast ==
- Pedro Oscar Alatriste
- Eva de la Fuente
- Enrique del Campo
- Conchita del Hoyo
- Godofredo Kun
- Max Langler
- Luis Marquez
- Taina Niki
- Guillermo Olaya
- Alfonso Parra
- Ramón Pereda
- Quinto Simidoni
- Tania Tamanova
- Julio Webber
- Dolores Yustis

== Bibliography ==
- Federico Dávalos Orozco & Esperanza Vázquez Bernal. Filmografía General Del Cine Mexicano, 1906-1931. Universidad Autónoma de Puebla, 1985.
