= A Macabre Legacy =

Herencia Macabra
- Directed by: José Bohr
- Starring: Miguel Arenas; Consuelo Frank; Ramón Armengod
- Release date: 1940
- Country: Mexico
- Language: Spanish

A Macabre Legacy (Spanish: Herencia macabra) is a 1940 Mexican horror film directed by José Bohr and starring Miguel Arenas, Consuelo Frank and Ramón Armengod.
