= Elena D'Orgaz =

Mexican actress

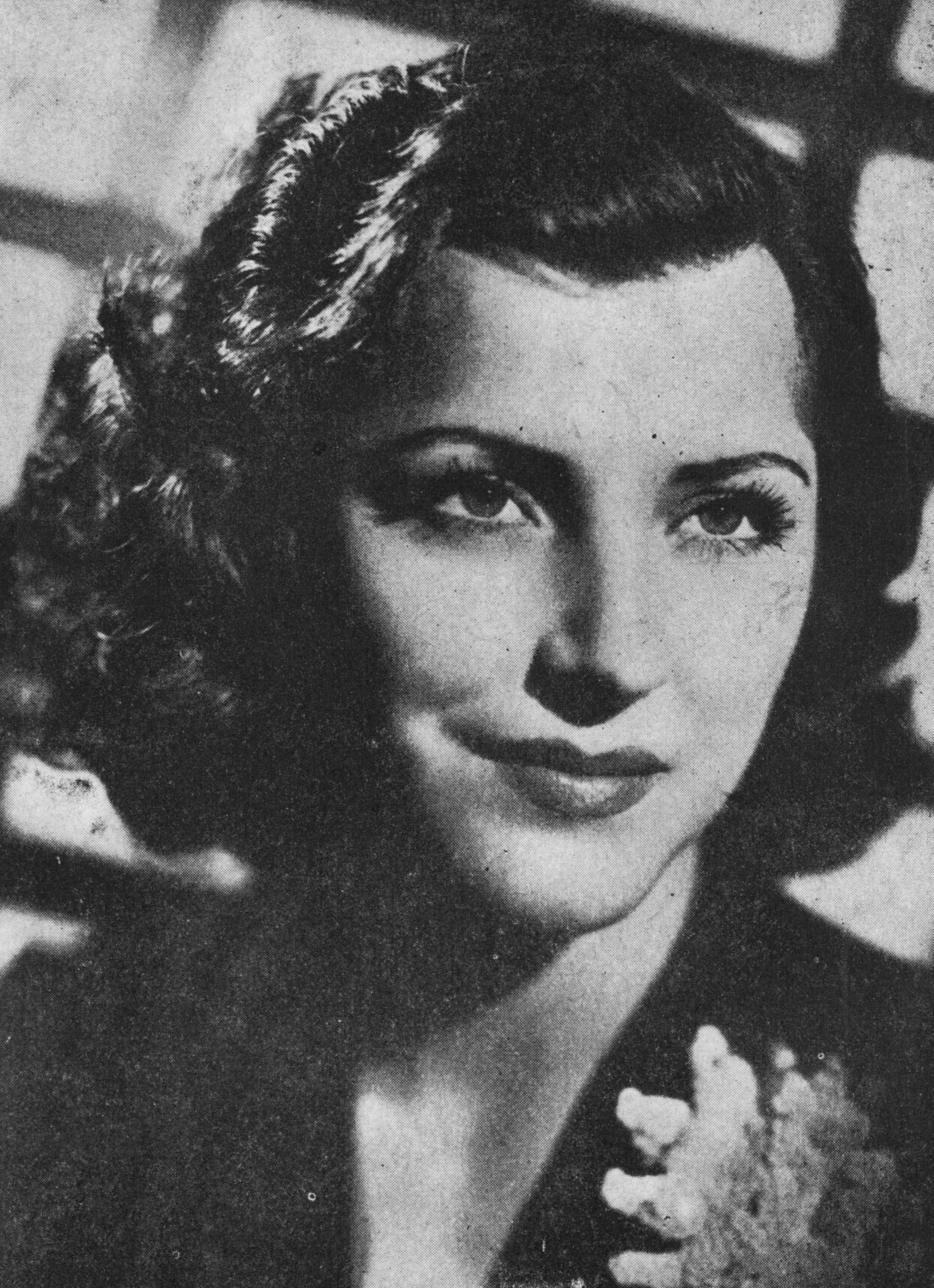
- D'Orgaz in 1945
- Occupation: Actress
- Years active: 1935–1948 (film)

Elena D'Orgaz was a Mexican actress of the Golden Age of Mexican cinema.

== Selected filmography ==
- Dreams of Love (1935)
- El Rosario de Amozoc (1938)
- The Whip (1939)
- The Sign of Death (1939)
- Borrasca humana (1940)
- Resurrection (1943)
- Saint Francis of Assisi (1944)
- El Capitán Malacara (1945)
- You Have the Eyes of a Deadly Woman (1947)

== Bibliography ==
- Darlene J. Sadlier. Latin American Melodrama: Passion, Pathos, and Entertainment. University of Illinois Press, 2009.
