= Diego Corrientes (1959 film) =

- Directed by: Antonio Isasi-Isasmendi
- Written by: Pedro Chamorro; Lluís Josep Comerón; José Gallardo; Jorge Illa; Antonio Isasi-Isasmendi; Pedro Masó; Luis Lucas Ojeda
- Produced by: Antonio Isasi-Isasmendi
- Starring: José Suarez; Marisa de Leza; Eulália del Pino
- Cinematography: Salvador Torres Garriga
- Edited by: Emilio Rodríguez
- Music by: Xavier Montsalvatge
- Production company: Isasi P.C.
- Distributed by: Hispano Foxfilms
- Release date: 31 August 1959
- Running time: 98 minutes
- Country: Spain
- Language: Spanish

Diego Corrientes is a 1959 Spanish historical adventure film directed by Antonio Isasi-Isasmendi and starring José Suarez, Marisa de Leza and Eulália del Pino. It portrays the life of the eighteenth century highwaymen Diego Corrientes Mateos.

== Synopsis ==
The greed and usury of the Count of Albanes has inflamed the town where Diego Corrientes lives. He confronts the tyrannical count and the latter takes revenge on him by whipping him in the woods. After being rescued by Beatriz, the count's fiancee, Diego is arrested again, managing to escape from the galley that takes him to Seville, but in the scuffle a soldier accidentally dies, which causes Diego to be accused of murder. At that time, Diego Corrientes formed a gang with a few evicted peasants and fled to the mountains, devoting himself to stealing from the rich to distribute among the poor.

== Cast ==
- José Suárez as Diego Corrientes
- Marisa de Leza as Beatriz
- Eulália del Pino as Carmela
- Milo Quesada as Conde
- Jesús Colomer as Agustín
- José Marco as Martín
- Luis Induni as Mochuelo
- Josep Maria Angelat
- Rafael Bardem
- Manuel Bronchud
- Juan Cebrián
- Camino Delgado
- Miquel Graneri
- Margarita Lozano
- Antonio Martín
- Juan Monfort
- Luis Orduña
- José Manuel Pinillos
- Carlos Ronda
- Benito Simón
- Francisco Tuset

== Bibliography ==
- de España, Rafael. Directory of Spanish and Portuguese film-makers and films. Greenwood Press, 1994.
