= Así es la mujer =

Such Is Woman
- Directed by: José Bohr
- Written by: José Bohr
- Starring: Sara García, José Bohr, Barry Norton, René Cardona
- Release date: 1936
- Running time: 80 minutes
- Country: Mexico
- Language: Spanish

Así es la mujer (English: That's how women are) is a 1936 Mexican film. It stars Sara García, in what was her first protagonist role.
