= José's Big Lunch =

1928 film

El gran almuerzo de José Campo
- Directed by: Chano Urueta
- Release date: 1928
- Country: Mexico
- Language: Silent

El gran almuerzo de José Campo (U.S. title: "José's Big Lunch") is a 1928 Mexican film. It was directed by Chano Urueta as his second feature. It is a social satire about a rich man who holds a banquet in Guadalajara only to have it end in catastrophe. It is thought to be a lost film.
