= Tropical Soul =

1924 film

- Directed by: Miguel Contreras Torres; Manuel R. Ojeda
- Written by: Miguel Contreras Torres; Adolfo Quezada
- Produced by: Miguel Contreras Torres; Manuel R. Ojeda
- Cinematography: Julio Lamadrid
- Production company: Promex
- Release date: 1 January 1924
- Country: Mexico
- Languages: Silent; Spanish intertitles

Tropical Soul (Spanish: Almas tropicales) is a 1924 Mexican silent film directed by Miguel Contreras Torres and Manuel R. Ojeda.

== Cast ==
- Miguel Contreras Torres
- María Cozzi
- Víctor Herrera
- Miguel Marques
- Alberto Miquel
- Manuel R. Ojeda
- Ignacio Rosas
- Rafael Vera de Córdova
- Gobbie West

== Bibliography ==
- Federico Dávalos Orozco & Esperanza Vázquez Bernal. Filmografía General Del Cine Mexicano, 1906-1931. Universidad Autónoma de Puebla, 1985.
