= Manuel R. Ojeda =

Mexican filmmaker

- Born: Manuel Romulo Ojeda; February 17, 1898; Mexico
- Died: Unknown
- Occupation(s): Writer, director, screenwriter, actor, cinematographer, editor

Manuel R. Ojeda was a Mexican writer, director, screenwriter, actor, cinematographer, editor, producer, and production manager who worked in Hollywood and Mexico from the 1910s through the 1960s.

== Biography ==
Manuel was born in Mexico in 1898 to parents of Spanish descent; he told reporters that his father was the Mexican ambassador to France, and the family spent time in Europe and Argentina when Manuel was young. When the Mexican Revolution broke out, the Ojedas relocated to Los Angeles, where Manuel pursued a career as an actor as early as 1912.

Around 1920, he decided made plans to travel to Peru to produce films there with an American crew. It is unclear whether or not he was successful in that venture, but he then appears to have begun a career behind the camera in Mexico, starting with 1921's La Rosa del Desierto. In addition to a string of narrative features, he also directed a string of documentaries. Toward the end of his career, he worked as a production manager in Mexico.

== Selected filmography ==
As director:

- La rosa del desierto (1921)
- Almas tropicales (1924)
- El Cristo de oro (1926)
- Conspiración (1927)
- El coloso de mármol (1929)
- Águilas de América (1933)
- Judas (1936)
- The Tragic Circus (1939)
- La canción del huérfano (1940)
- La última aventura de Chaflán (1942)
- De Nueva York a Huipanguillo (1943)

As screenwriter:

- La insaciable (1947)
- Zorina (1949)
- La mujer que yo perdí (1949)
- Ultraje al amor (1956)
- Tizoc (1957)
- Pueblo en armas (1959)
- ¡Viva la soldadera! (1960)
- The Happy Musketeers (1961)
- La tórtola del Ajusco (1962)

As actor:

- The Law of the North (1918)
- Rustling a Bride (1919)
- The Man Who Turned White (1919)
- Pinto (1920)
- A Double-Dyed Deceiver (1920)
- The Scuttlers (1920)
