= Carlos Villatoro =

Mexican screenwriter and actor

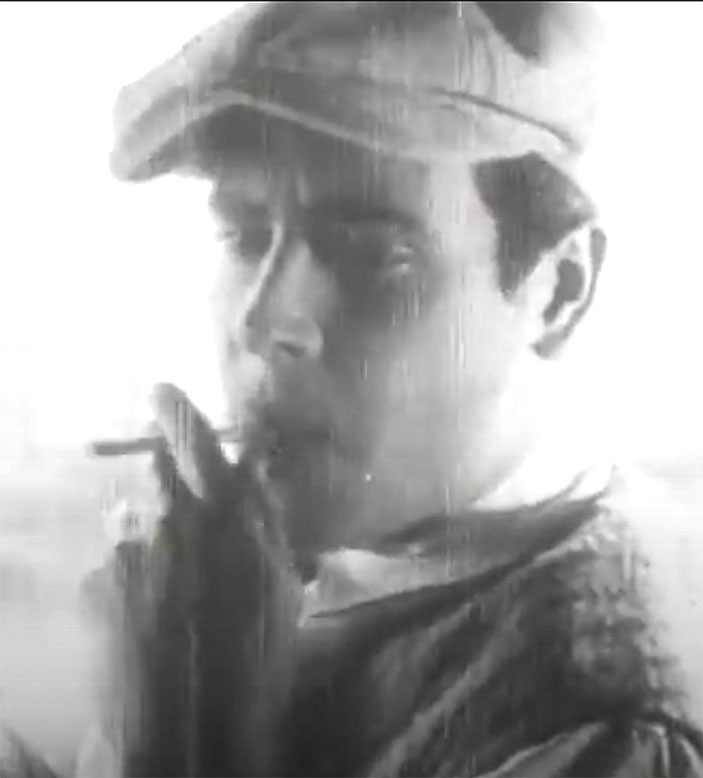
- Villatoro in El tren fantasma ("The Ghost Train", 1926)
- Born: 14 January 1903; Comitan, Chiapas, Mexico
- Died: 14 March 1963 (aged 60); Mexico City, Mexico
- Occupations: Actor, director, writer
- Years active: 1925–1963 (film)

Carlos Humberto Villatoro Escobedo, known as Carlos Villatoro (14 January 1903 – 14 March 1963) was a Mexican screenwriter and film actor.

== Selected filmography ==
- Dos Monjes (1934)
- Dreams of Love (1935)
- Luponini from Chicago (1935)
- Judas (1936)
- La Mujer sin Alma (1943)
- Nobody's Children (1952)

== Bibliography ==
- Vázquez Bernal, Esperanza; Dávalos Orozco, Federico. Carlos Villatoro: pasajes en la vida de un hombre de cine. National Autonomous University of Mexico, 1999.
- García Riera, Emilio. Historia documental del cine mexicano: 1929-1937. University of Guadalajara, 1992.
