= Diego Corrientes Mateos =

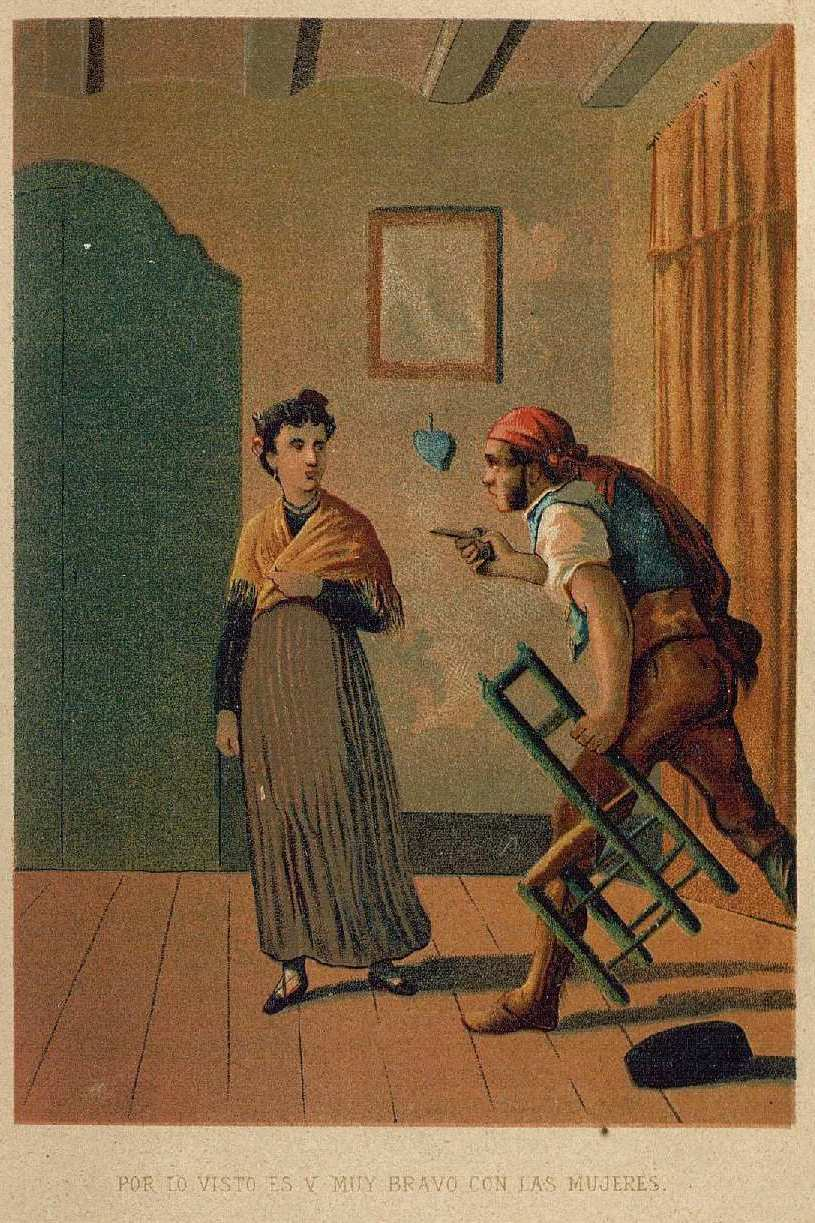

Diego Corrientes Mateos (August 20, 1757 – 1781) was a Spanish bandit famous for his generosity to the poor.

He was born in Utrera, Seville on August 20, 1757, and died by hanging in Seville in 1781.

In 1780, Charles III of Spain offered 100 gold pieces to anyone who captured Corrientes Mateos dead or alive. Corrientes Mateos fled to Portugal but was captured by the governor of Seville and a band of Portuguese under Captain Arias. After being brought back to Seville, he was tried and sentenced to death by hanging. After his death, his body was cut into pieces and sent to the different provinces where he had been active. His head stayed in Seville and was buried in the Church of San Roque, where it was found in the 20th century during restoration work. A metal hook was found in the cranium.

== Legacy ==
He has been portrayed in four films including two silent productions. The most recent portrayal was by José Suárez in the 1959 film Diego Corrientes.

An article was published in 1999 denouncing the irregularities in the extradition process from Portugal to Spain.
