= José Bohr =

Chilean film director (1901–1994)

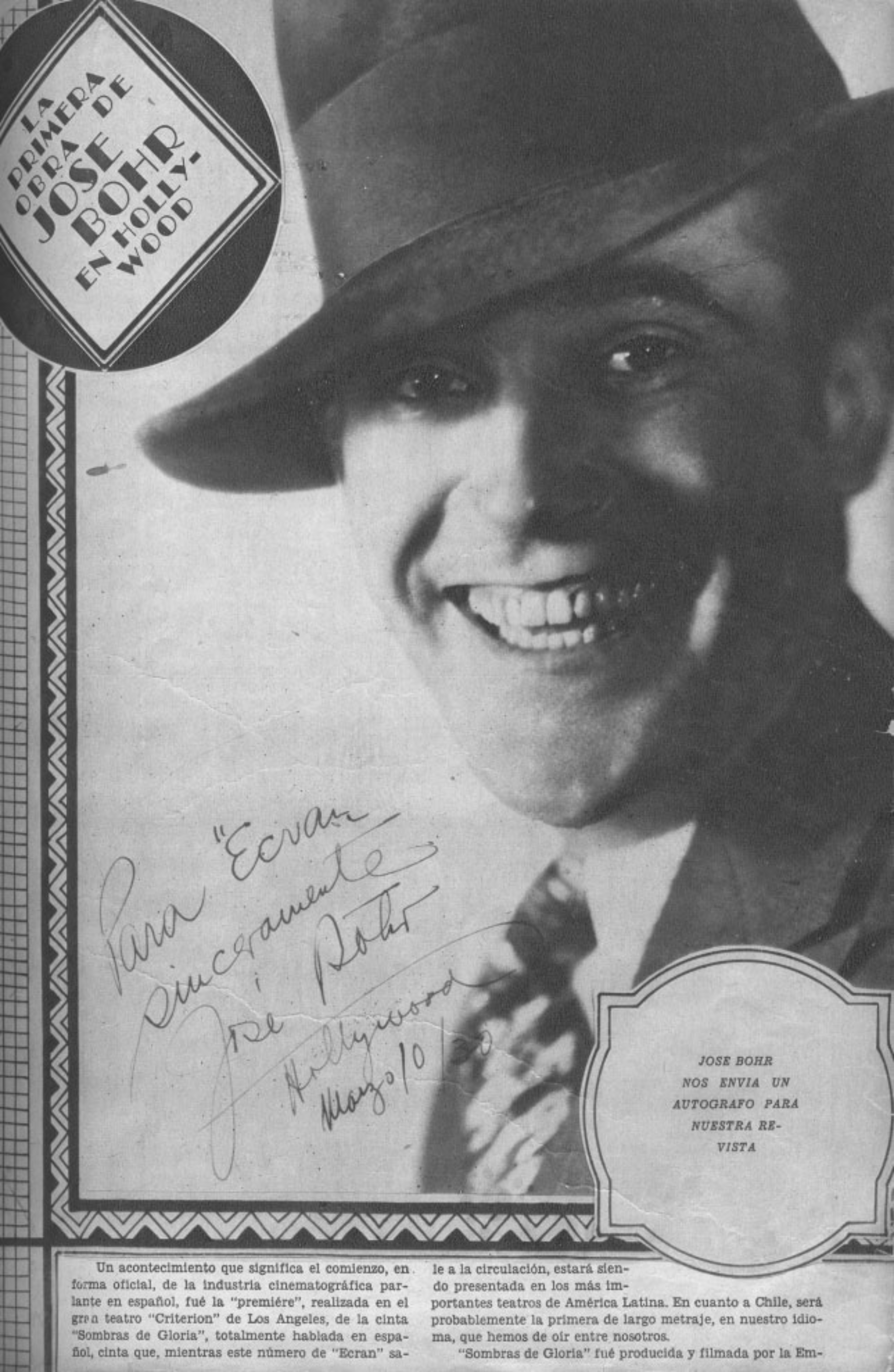
- Bohr in 1930
- Born: Joseph Bohr Elzer; 3 September 1901; Bonn, German Empire
- Died: 29 May 1994 (aged 92); Oslo, Norway
- Occupations: Director; producer; actor; screenwriter; composer; singer
- Years active: 1919–1969
- Spouse: Eva Limiñana (m. 1924–1942)

José Bohr (3 September 1901 – 29 May 1994), born Joseph Bohr Elzer, was a German-born Chilean film director, producer, actor, screenwriter, composer, and singer, active in Chilean, Mexican, American, and Argentine cinema. Between 1919 and 1969, Bohr directed 35 films. Bohr also composed 8 tangos, the best known of which is Cascabelito, and is sometimes mistakenly known as the orchestra leader for records that are actually his wife's Eva Bohr's orchestra.

== Selected Filmography ==
=== Actor ===
- Así es la vida (1930)
- Rogue of the Rio Grande (1930)
- Sombras de gloria (1930)
- Ex-Flame (1930)
- Hollywood, ciudad de ensueño (1931)

=== Director ===
- La sangre manda (1934)
- Luponini de Chicago (1935)
- Sueño de amor (1935)
- Tu Hijo (1935)
- Así es la mujer (1936)
- Por mis pistolas (1938)
- El rosario de Amozoc (1938)
- El látigo (1939)
- Una luz en mi camino (1939)
- Herencia macabra (1940)
- Borrasca humana (1940)
- Si mis campos hablaran (1947)
- La dama de las camelias (1947)
- Mis espuelas de plata (1948)
- Tonto pillo (1948)
- Uno que ha sido marino (1951)
- El gran circo Chamorro (1955)
- Un chileno en España (1962)
- Sonrisas de Chile (1970)

== Personal life ==
José Bohr was born in Germany in 1901. Bohr then moved with his family to Chile in 1904 to colonize the area when he was 3 years old. He travelled frequently throughout South America in his young adulthood, eventually going to the United States for a period of time where he filmed the movie Sombras de Gloria (1930). In the 1940's, Bohr would move back to Chile to work for a Chilean-government sponsored production company, Chile Films. By the early 1980's, José Bohr moved to Denmark and spent the rest of his life in Europe.

Jose Bohr married Eva Limiñana in 1924. Limiñana, a screenwriter and pianist, frequently collaborated artistically with Bohr throughout their marriage. Bohr is quoted calling her his "compañera de arte y de vida," or his "partner in art and in life." The couple divorced in 1942 after 18 years of marriage.

== Reception ==
As an actor, Bohr was praised for his performance in Sombras de Gloria (1930), which received a symbolic Oscar, as the category for Best Latin Film did not exist at the time. As a director, Bohr was often praised for his "realización cine-dramática," or his dramatic filmmaking.

Bohr's work was part of a larger discussion in the Hispanic community at the time. The use of the Spanish language in Hollywood films intended for Hispanic had become a topic of debate. Specifically, the use of accents within these films and scripts that preferred an Iberian dialect over one of the many dialects of South America when catering to a Hispanic market. While there were a wide variety of opinions on the matter, Bohr believed that it should be up to the actor and what they felt most comfortable doing in their performance.
