= 1945 in British radio =

This is a list of events from British radio in 1945.

== Events ==
=== January ===
- No events.

=== February ===
- No events.

=== March ===
- No events.

=== April ===
- 15 April – BBC correspondent Richard Dimbleby accompanies the British 11th Armoured Division to the liberation of Bergen-Belsen concentration camp, making one of the first reports from there. His description of what he sees ("the world of a nightmare") is so graphic, the BBC declines to broadcast his dispatch for 4 days, relenting only when he threatens to resign.
- 30 April – William Joyce ("Lord Haw-Haw") records his final (rambling and audibly drunk) English-language propaganda broadcast for Nazi German radio.

=== May ===
- 1 May – This evening, Reichssender Hamburg's Flensburg substation, the last shortwave radio station remaining on the air in Germany, interrupts a concert to announce the death of Adolf Hitler. The first place in the UK to hear of this is the BBC Monitoring Service at Caversham Park near Reading, Berkshire. The BBC Forces Programme announces the death as a newsflash in this evening's edition of Music While You Work and a BBC Home Service broadcast from Glasgow is interrupted by Stuart Hibberd with the news.
- 4 May – Radio Hamburg begins broadcasting from the British occupied zone of Germany, with Wynford Vaughan-Thomas speaking from "Lord Haw-Haw"'s studio for the BBC. On 22 September, the station becomes Nordwestdeutscher Rundfunk (NWDR), the zone's official broadcasting organisation, set up by Hugh Greene.
- 7 May – The last German communication to be decoded at Bletchley Park is from a military radio station at Cuxhaven closing down. At 19:40 this evening, the BBC in the UK announces that the following day will be a holiday, Victory in Europe Day.
- 8 May – Victory in Europe Day in Western Europe. At 15:00 BST in the UK, the Prime Minister, Winston Churchill, makes a speech to the nation on the BBC from 10 Downing Street, and at 21:00 King George VI speaks to the British Empire from Buckingham Palace. Wynford Vaughan-Thomas reports from Lüneburg and Frank Gillard from Kassel. Stuart Hibberd reads the midnight news bulletin, marking the official end of hostilities.
- 14 May – Reuters story broadcast on the BBC Home Service on the discovery of what are thought to be the burned remains of Adolf Hitler's body. This is filed by Reuters correspondent Duncan Hooper from Berlin.
- 28 May – U.S.-born Irish-raised Nazi propagandist William Joyce ("Lord Haw-Haw") is captured by British forces on the German border. He later stands trial in London for high treason for his earlier wartime broadcasts, is convicted, and hanged in January 1946.

=== June ===
- 4 June – Prime Minister Winston Churchill, in a broadcast speech during the 1945 United Kingdom general election campaign, claims that a future socialist government "would have to fall back on some form of Gestapo". His eventually successful opponent Clement Attlee responds the next night by ironically thanking the prime minister for demonstrating to people the difference between Churchill the great wartime leader and Churchill the peacetime politician.

=== July ===
- 1 July – For the 50th season the BBC Proms return from their wartime retreat in Bedford back to the Royal Albert Hall in London. The First Night concert includes William Walton's Memorial Fanfare for Henry Wood, as well as a performance of Elgar's Cockaigne (In London Town).
- 28 July – The BBC Allied Expeditionary Forces Programme ceases broadcasting because the British Forces Network and radio stations of the other Allies are now broadcasting within their zones of occupation in Europe.
- 29 July – The BBC Light Programme radio station is launched, concentrating on the broadcasting of mainstream light music and entertainment, superseding the BBC General Forces Programme within the UK using its 1500 m longwave frequency from the Droitwich Transmitting Station.

=== August ===
- 1 August – Family Favourites is the successor to the wartime radio show Forces Favourites, broadcast at Sunday lunchtimes on the Light Programme in the UK and the British Forces Broadcasting Service in Europe; it runs until 1980.
- 14 August – Late this evening, the new Prime Minister, Clement Attlee, and his Foreign Secretary, Ernest Bevin, broadcast news of the surrender of Japan to the nation and Empire, speaking from 10 Downing Street.

=== September to December ===
- No events.

=== Unknown ===
- The BBC issues the first Welsh edition of Radio Times.
- Welsh BBC correspondence Wynford Vaughan-Thomas is awarded the Croix de guerre 1939–1945 for his war reports from France.

== Station debuts ==
- 29 July – BBC Light Programme (1945–1967)

== Debuts ==
- 1 August – Family Favourites (1945–1980)
- 9 October – Today in Parliament (1945–Present)

== Continuing radio programmes ==
=== 1930s ===
- In Town Tonight (1933–1960)

=== 1940s ===
- Music While You Work (1940–1967)
- Sunday Half Hour (1940–2018)
- Desert Island Discs (1942–Present)

== Births ==
- 9 January – Bill Heine, American-born radio presenter and cinema owner (died 2019)
- 20 January – Christopher Martin-Jenkins, cricket commentator (died 2013)
- 30 March – Johnnie Walker, born Peter Dingley, DJ (died 2024)
- 25 May – Dave Lee Travis, born David Griffin, DJ
- 22 August – Pete Atkin, singer-songwriter and radio producer
- 23 August – Peter Donaldson, Egyptian-born newsreader (died 2015)
- 15 September – Clive Merrison, Welsh-born actor (Sherlock Holmes)
- 28 October – Simon Brett, radio producer and scriptwriter and detective fiction writer
- Ernie Rea, Northern Irish religious broadcaster

== Deaths ==
- 3 February – Guy Byam, war reporter (shot down while flying on an air raid)
- 18 September – C. H. Middleton, gardening broadcaster (born 1886)

== See also ==
- 1945 in British music
- 1945 in British television
- 1945 in the United Kingdom
- List of British films of 1945
