= 1945 in film =

The year 1945 in film involved some significant events. With 1945 being the last year of World War II, the many films released this year had themes of patriotism, sacrifices, and peace. In the United States, there were more than nineteen thousand movie theatres operating at the end of 1945, a third more than a decade earlier.

== Events ==
- January 26 – The film National Velvet, starring Mickey Rooney, Elizabeth Taylor, Donald Crisp and Anne Revere, is released nationally in the United States. The film is an instant critical and commercial success, propelling 12-year-old Taylor to lifetime stardom and earning Revere the Academy Award for Best Supporting Actress.
- January 30 – Restricted release of Kolberg, an historical epic which is one of the last Nazi Germany propaganda pieces, in war-torn Berlin. Given its cast of 187,000 (including serving military personnel), probably fewer people watched it than appeared in it.
- April 20 – Release of Son of Lassie, the 2nd Lassie film and the first film ever to be filmed using the Technicolor monopack method, where a single magazine of film is used to record all of the primary colors. Prior to this method, the most popular recording method was 3-Strip Technicolor, which simultaneously used 3 individual film magazines to record the primary colors.
- August 10 – Animated Donald Duck short Duck Pimples is released.
- September 27 – Release of Roberto Rossellini's Rome, Open City (Roma Città aperta) marks the beginning of Italian neorealism in film.
- October 5 – A strike between the set decorators' union and the studios boils over and becomes known as the Hollywood Black Friday.
- October 31 – Spellbound, a psychological thriller directed by Alfred Hitchcock, premieres in New York City.
- November 16 – Paramount Pictures releases theatrical short cartoon titled The Friendly Ghost, introducing a ghost named Casper.
- November 29 – At the Nuremberg trials, compilation documentary Nazi Concentration Camps produced by John Ford is exhibited as evidence.
- December 20 – A Hollywood film, Call of the Yukon, is released in Japan for the first time since July 1941.

== Awards ==
Category/Organization	18th Academy Awards March 7, 1946	3rd Golden Globe Awards March 30, 1946
Best Film	The Lost Weekend	
Best Director	Billy Wilder; The Lost Weekend	
Best Actor	Ray Milland; The Lost Weekend	
Best Actress	Joan Crawford; Mildred Pierce	Ingrid Bergman; The Bells of St. Mary's
Best Supporting Actor	James Dunn; A Tree Grows in Brooklyn	J. Carrol Naish; A Medal for Benny
Best Supporting Actress	Anne Revere; National Velvet	Angela Lansbury; The Picture of Dorian Gray

== Top-grossing films (U.S.) ==
The top ten 1945 released films by box office gross in North America are as follows:

Highest-grossing films of 1945
Rank	Title	Distributor	Domestic rentals
1	The Bells of St. Mary's	RKO	$8,000,000
2	Leave Her to Heaven	20th Century Fox	$5,550,000
3	Spellbound	United Artists/Selznick International	$4,975,000
4	The Valley of Decision	MGM	$4,566,000
5	Anchors Aweigh	MGM	$4,498,000
6	Week-End at the Waldorf	MGM	$4,364,000
7	Thrill of a Romance	MGM	$4,338,000
8	The Lost Weekend	Paramount	$4,300,000
9	State Fair	20th Century Fox	$4,050,000
10	National Velvet	MGM	$3,678,000

== Top ten money making stars ==
Rank	Star
1	Bing Crosby
2	Van Johnson
3	Greer Garson
4	Betty Grable
5	Spencer Tracy
6	Humphrey Bogart, Gary Cooper
7	Bob Hope
8	Judy Garland
9	Margaret O'Brien
10	Roy Rogers

*Source: Best Years Going to the Movies, 1945-1946

== 1945 film releases ==
=== January–March ===
- January 1945
  - 4 January
    - This Man's Navy
  - 8 January
    - Frenchman's Creek
  - 18 January
    - A Song to Remember
  - 26 January
    - National Velvet
- February 1945
  - 2 February
    - Here Come the Co-eds
  - 15 February
    - The Seventh Veil
- March 1945
  - 3 March
    - The Picture of Dorian Gray
  - 16 March
    - The House of Fear

=== April–June ===
- April 1945
  - 7 April
    - Brewster's Millions
  - 17 April
    - Rockin' in the Rockies
  - 20 April
    - The Horn Blows at Midnight
  - 29 April
    - Tarzan and the Amazons
- May 1945
  - 25 May
    - The Clock
- June 1945
  - 1 June
    - That's the Spirit
  - 23 June
    - Murder, He Says
  - 30 June
    - Conflict

=== July–September ===
- July 1945
  - 13 July
    - The Story of G.I. Joe
  - 19 July
    - Along Came Jones
  - 27 July
    - The Woman in Green
- August 1945
  - 11 August
    - Christmas in Connecticut
  - 30 August
    - State Fair
- September 1945
  - 22 September
    - Rhapsody in Blue

=== October–December ===
- October 1945
  - 20 October
    - Mildred Pierce
  - 26 October
    - Love Letters
  - 31 October
    - And Then There Were None
    - Spellbound
- November 1945
  - 1 November
    - Vacation from Marriage
  - 10 November
    - Confidential Agent
- December 1945
  - 7 December
    - House of Dracula
  - 8 December
    - The Enchanted Forest
  - 20 December
    - Dick Tracy
  - 25 December
    - A Walk in the Sun
  - 28 December
    - Scarlet Street
  - 31 December
    - They Were Expendable

== Notable films released in 1945 ==
United States unless stated

=== A ===
- The Abandoned (Las Abandonadas), starring Dolores del Río and Pedro Armendáriz – (Mexico)
- Abbott and Costello in Hollywood, starring Bud Abbott and Lou Costello
- Allotment Wives, starring Kay Francis
- Along Came Jones, starring Gary Cooper and Loretta Young
- Amok – (Mexico)
- Anchors Aweigh, starring Gene Kelly and Frank Sinatra
- And Then There Were None, starring Barry Fitzgerald, Walter Huston, Louis Hayward, Judith Anderson

=== B ===
- Back to Bataan, directed by Edward Dmytryk, with John Wayne
- A Bell For Adano, starring Gene Tierney and John Hodiak
- The Bells of St. Mary's, directed by Leo McCarey, starring Bing Crosby and Ingrid Bergman
- Blithe Spirit, directed by David Lean, starring Rex Harrison and Constance Cummings, based on the play by Noël Coward – (GB)
- Blood on the Sun, starring James Cagney
- The Body Snatcher, directed by Robert Wise, starring Boris Karloff
- Boule de suif (Angel and Sinner) – (France)
- Bougainvillea (Bugambilia), starring Pedro Armendariz and Dolores del Río – (Mexico)
- Brewster's Millions, starring Dennis O'Keefe
- Brief Encounter, directed by David Lean, starring Celia Johnson and Trevor Howard- (GB)

=== C ===
- Caesar and Cleopatra, directed by Gabriel Pascal, starring Vivien Leigh and Claude Rains – (GB)
- Captain Kidd, starring Charles Laughton
- The Cheaters, starring Joseph Schildkraut and Billie Burke
- The Cherokee Flash, starring Sunset Carson and Linda Stirling
- Children of Paradise (Les Enfants du Paradis), by Marcel Carné, starring Arletty, released following the liberation of France
- Christmas in Connecticut, starring Barbara Stanwyck
- Circus Cavalcade (La cabalgata del circo) – (Argentina)
- The Clock, starring Judy Garland
- Confidential Agent, starring Charles Boyer and Lauren Bacall
- Conflict, starring Humphrey Bogart
- Counter-Attack, starring Paul Muni and Marguerite Chapman
- The Corn Is Green, starring Bette Davis and John Dall
- Cornered, directed by Edward Dmytryk, starring Dick Powell

=== D ===
- Dakota, starring John Wayne
- Les dames du Bois de Boulogne, directed by Robert Bresson – (France)
- Dead of Night, Ealing Studios chiller compendium starring Mervyn Johns and Googie Withers – (GB)
- Death Mills, directed by Billy Wilder
- Detour, starring Tom Neal and Ann Savage
- Diamond Horseshoe, starring Betty Grable
- Dick Tracy, starring Morgan Conway and Mike Mazurki
- Dillinger, starring Lawrence Tierney
- The Dolly Sisters, starring Betty Grable

=== E ===
- The Enchanted Cottage, starring Dorothy McGuire and Robert Young
- The Enchanted Forest, starring Harry Davenport
- Escape in the Fog, starring Otto Kruger and Nina Foch

=== F ===
- Fallen Angel, directed by Otto Preminger, starring Alice Faye in her last major film role, Dana Andrews and Linda Darnell
- Flame of Barbary Coast, starring John Wayne

=== G ===
- The Great Flamarion, directed by Anthony Mann, starring Erich von Stroheim
- Guest Wife, starring Claudette Colbert and Don Ameche
- Gun Smoke, starring Johnny Mack Brown and Jennifer Holt

=== H ===
- Hangover Square, starring Laird Cregar, Linda Darnell and George Sanders
- Here Come the Co-Eds, starring Bud Abbott and Lou Costello
- High Powered, starring Phyllis Brooks and Robert Lowery
- The Horn Blows at Midnight, starring Jack Benny
- Hotel Berlin, starring Faye Emerson and Raymond Massey
- The House I Live In, a short film starring Frank Sinatra, awarded a special Oscar for its message of tolerance
- House of Dracula, starring Lon Chaney Jr. and John Carradine
- The House of Fear (1945 film), a Sherlock Holmes mystery directed by Roy William Neill, starring Basil Rathbone as Holmes, and Nigel Bruce as Watson
- The House on 92nd Street, produced by Louis de Rochemont, starring Lloyd Nolan and Signe Hasso
- Humayun, starring Ashok Kumar – (India)

=== I ===
- I Know Where I'm Going!, directed by Michael Powell and Emeric Pressburger, starring Wendy Hiller and Roger Livesey – (GB)
- I Live in Grosvenor Square, starring Anna Neagle, Rex Harrison and Robert Morley – (GB)
- I'll Be Your Sweetheart, directed by Val Guest, starring Margaret Lockwood (GB)
- Incendiary Blonde, starring Betty Hutton
- The Invisible Army (Den usynlige hær) – (Denmark)
- Isle of the Dead, starring Boris Karloff and Ellen Drew
- It's in the Bag!, starring Fred Allen, Jack Benny, Don Ameche
- Ivan the Terrible (Ivan Grozniy), directed by Sergei Eisenstein, starring Nikolai Cherkasov – (U.S.S.R.)

=== J ===
- Johnny Angel, starring George Raft and Claire Trevor

=== K ===
- Kiss and Tell, starring Shirley Temple
- Kitty, directed by Mitchell Leisen, starring Paulette Goddard and Ray Milland
- Kolberg – (Nazi Germany)

=== L ===
- Lady on a Train, starring Deanna Durbin and Ralph Bellamy
- The Last Chance (Die letzte Chance) – (Switzerland)
- Leave Her to Heaven, starring Gene Tierney and Cornel Wilde
- Life Begins Anew, directed by Mario Mattoli starring Alida Valli, Fosco Giachetti (Italy)
- The Lost Letter (Propavshaya gramota) – (USSR)
- The Lost Weekend, directed by Billy Wilder, starring Ray Milland and Jane Wyman
- Love Letters, starring Jennifer Jones and Joseph Cotten

=== M ===
- Madonna of the Seven Moons, starring Phyllis Calvert and Stewart Granger – (GB)
- The Man in Half Moon Street, starring Nils Asther
- A Medal for Benny, starring Dorothy Lamour
- The Men who Tread on the Tiger's Tail (Tora no o wo fumu otokotachi), directed by Akira Kurosawa – (Japan)
- Mildred Pierce, directed by Michael Curtiz, starring Joan Crawford, Ann Blyth, Jack Carson, Zachary Scott, Eve Arden
- Mom and Dad, a hygiene documentary
- Momotaro, Sacred Sailors (Momotarō: Umi no Shinpei), the first feature-length animated film from Japan
- My Name is Julia Ross, starring Nina Foch

=== N ===
- The Naughty Nineties, starring Bud Abbott and Lou Costello

=== O ===
- Objective, Burma!, starring Errol Flynn
- Our Vines Have Tender Grapes, starring Edward G. Robinson and Margaret O'Brien

=== P ===
- Pardon My Past, starring Fred MacMurray and Marguerite Chapman
- Perfect Strangers, starring Robert Donat and Deborah Kerr – (GB)
- The Picture of Dorian Gray, starring George Sanders and Hurd Hatfield
- Pink String and Sealing Wax, starring Googie Withers and Mervyn Johns – (GB)
- La porta del cielo (The Gate of Heaven), directed by Vittorio De Sica – (Italy)
- Pride of the Marines, starring John Garfield
- Pursuit to Algiers, a Sherlock Holmes mystery directed by Roy William Neill, starring Basil Rathbone as Holmes, and Nigel Bruce as Watson

=== R ===
- The Rake's Progress, starring Rex Harrison – (GB)
- The Red Meadows (De røde enge) – (Denmark)
- Rhapsody in Blue, a biopic of George Gershwin starring Robert Alda
- Rockin' in the Rockies, starring the Three Stooges
- Roll Call in Heaven (Cuando en el cielo pasen lista) – (Argentina)
- Rome, Open City (Roma Città aperta), directed by Roberto Rossellini, starring Anna Magnani and Aldo Fabrizi – (Italy)
- A Royal Scandal, starring Tallulah Bankhead
- Rustlers' Hideout, starring Buster Crabbe and Al St. John

=== S ===
- Salome Where She Danced, starring Yvonne De Carlo
- San Antonio, starring Errol Flynn and Alexis Smith
- Saratoga Trunk, starring Gary Cooper and Ingrid Bergman
- Scarlet Street, directed by Fritz Lang, starring Edward G. Robinson and Joan Bennett
- La selva de fuego (The Forest Fire), starring Dolores del Río and Arturo de Córdova – (Mexico)
- The Seventh Veil, starring James Mason and Ann Todd – (GB)
- Son of Lassie, starring Peter Lawford
- A Song to Remember, a biopic of Frédéric Chopin starring Cornel Wilde
- The Southerner, starring Zachary Scott
- The Spanish Main, starring Maureen O'Hara and Paul Henreid
- Spellbound, directed by Alfred Hitchcock, starring Ingrid Bergman and Gregory Peck
- State Fair, starring Dana Andrews and Jeanne Crain
- The Stork Club, starring Betty Hutton
- The Story of G.I. Joe, directed by William Wellman, starring Burgess Meredith and Robert Mitchum
- The Strange Affair of Uncle Harry, starring George Sanders

=== T ===
- That's the Spirit, starring Jack Oakie
- They Were Expendable, directed by John Ford, starring Robert Montgomery and John Wayne
- The Thin Man Goes Home, starring William Powell and Myrna Loy
- This Man's Navy, starring Wallace Beery
- The Three Caballeros, a Walt Disney animated film starring Donald Duck and Dora Luz
- Thrill of a Romance, directed by Richard Thorpe, starring Esther Williams and Van Johnson
- Thunderhead, Son of Flicka, starring Roddy McDowall
- Tonight and Every Night, starring Rita Hayworth
- A Tree Grows In Brooklyn, directed by Elia Kazan, starring Dorothy McGuire
- Twice Blessed, starring Lee and Lyn Wilde
- Two O'Clock Courage, starring Ann Rutherford and Tom Conway

=== U ===
- The Unseen, starring Joel McCrea and Gail Russell

=== V ===
- The Valley of Decision, starring Greer Garson and Gregory Peck
- La vida en un hilo (Life on a Wire) – (Spain)

=== W ===
- A Walk in the Sun, starring Dana Andrews
- War Comes to America, directed by Frank Capra and Anatole Litvak
- Waterloo Road, starring John Mills and Stewart Granger – (GB)
- The Way to the Stars, starring John Mills and Michael Redgrave, written by Terence Rattigan – (GB)
- The Wicked Lady, starring Margaret Lockwood and James Mason – (GB)
- Without Love, starring Spencer Tracy, Katharine Hepburn, Lucille Ball
- The Woman in Green, a Sherlock Holmes mystery directed by Roy William Neill, starring Basil Rathbone as Holmes, and Nigel Bruce as Watson, co-starring Hillary Brook and Henry Daniell
- Wonder Man, starring Danny Kaye and Virginia Mayo

=== Y ===
- Yolanda and the Thief, starring Fred Astaire and Lucille Bremer

=== Z ===
- Ziegfeld Follies, with an MGM all-star cast

== Serials ==
- Brenda Starr, Reporter, starring Joan Woodbury
- Federal Operator 99, starring Marten Lamont
- Jungle Queen, starring Edward Norris and Eddie Quillan
- Jungle Raiders
- Manhunt on Mystery Island, starring Richard Bailey and Linda Stirling
- The Master Key, starring Dennis Moore
- The Monster and the Ape, starring Robert Lowery
- The Purple Monster Strikes, starring Dennis Moore and Linda Stirling
- The Royal Mounted Rides Again
- Secret Agent X-9, starring Lloyd Bridges
- Who's Guilty?

== Short film series ==
- Mickey Mouse (1928–1953)
- Looney Tunes (1930–1969)
- Terrytoons (1930–1964)
- Merrie Melodies (1931–1969)
- Popeye (1933–1957)
- Color Rhapsodies (1934–1949)
- Donald Duck (1937–1956)
- Goofy (1939–1955)
- Andy Panda (1939–1949)
- Tom and Jerry (1940–1958)
- Bugs Bunny (1940–1964)
- Woody Woodpecker (1941–1949)
- Swing Symphonies (1941-1945)
- The Fox and the Crow (1941–1950)
- Red Hot Riding Hood (1943–1949)
- Droopy (1943–1958)
- Screwball Squirrel (1944–1946)
- Yosemite Sam (1945–1963)

== Births ==
- January 5 – Roger Spottiswoode, Canadian-British-American director, editor and writer
- January 9 – John Doman, American actor
- January 14 – Kathleen Chalfant, American actress
- January 16 – Élisabeth Margoni, French actress
- January 22
  - Jophery Brown, American pitcher, stuntman and actor (died 2014)
  - Michael Cristofer, American actor and filmmaker
- January 25 – Leigh Taylor-Young, American actress
- January 28 – Marthe Keller, Swiss actress
- January 29 – Tom Selleck, American actor
- February 1 – Don Amendolia, American actor
- February 3 – Marius Weyers, South African actor
- February 4 – Tony Haygarth, English actor (died 2017)
- February 8 – Louis Giambalvo, American actor
- February 9 – Mia Farrow, American actress
- February 12
  - Maud Adams, Swedish actress
  - Cliff DeYoung, American actor
- February 16 – Jeremy Bulloch, English actor (died 2020)
- February 17
  - Brenda Fricker, Irish actress (died 2026)
  - Calvin Jung, American actor
- February 20
  - Andrew Bergman, American screenwriter and director
  - Brion James, American actor (died 1999)
- February 24 – Barry Bostwick, American actor
- February 27 – Carl Anderson, American singer and actor (died 2004)
- February 28 – Bubba Smith, American professional football player and actor (died 2011)
- March 1 – Dirk Benedict, American actor
- March 3
  - George Miller, Australian filmmaker
  - Larry Pine, American actor
  - Hattie Winston, American actress and voice artist
- March 8 – Janet Wright, English-born Canadian actress (died 2016)
- March 13 – Whitney Rydbeck, American actor (died 2024)
- March 19 – James Handy, American actor (died 2026)
- March 23 – Linal Haft, English actor
- March 24
  - Curtis Hanson, American director, screenwriter and producer (died 2016)
  - Patrick Malahide, British actor and producer
- March 28 – Raine Loo, Estonian actress (died 2020)
- April 2 – Linda Hunt, American actress
- April 3 – Catherine Spaak, Belgian-Italian actress and singer (died 2022)
- April 4 – Caroline McWilliams, American actress (died 2010)
- April 11 – Michael Brandon, American actor
- April 19 – Cleo Sylvestre, English actress (died 2024)
- May 1 - Diahnne Abbott, American actress
- May 14 – Francesca Annis, English actress
- May 18
  - Candice Azzara, American character actress
  - Gail Strickland, retired American actress
- May 24 – Priscilla Presley, American actress
- May 27 – Kip Niven, American actor (died 2019)
- May 30 – Makram Khoury, Israeli-Arab actor
- May 31 – Rainer Werner Fassbinder, German director, producer and screenwriter (died 1982)
- June 2
  - Jon Peters, American producer
  - Joan Pringle, American actress
- June 3 – Bill Paterson, Scottish actor
- June 6 – David Dukes, American actor (died 2000)
- June 11 – Adrienne Barbeau, American actress
- June 12 – Edwin Neal, American actor
- June 17 – Frank Ashmore, American actor
- July 1 – Debbie Harry, American actress and singer (lead vocalist of Blondie)
- July 3 – Mickey Rooney Jr., American actor (died 2022)
- July 4 – Bruce French, American actor (died 2025)
- July 6 – Burt Ward, American actor
- July 10 - Ron Glass, American actor (died 2016)
- July 15 - Jeffrey Kramer, American actor and producer
- July 19 – George Dzundza, American actor
- July 21 – Sergio Calderón, Mexican-born American actor (died 2023)
- July 23 – Edie McClurg, American actress and voice actress
- July 26 – Helen Mirren, English actress
- July 28 – Jim Davis, American cartoonist, screenwriter, producer and creator of Garfield
- August 2 – Joanna Cassidy, American actress
- August 5 – Loni Anderson, American actress (died 2025)
- August 14
  - Steve Martin, American actor and comedian
  - Wim Wenders, German director, producer and screenwriter
- August 15
  - Jill Haworth, English-American actress (died 2011)
  - Nigel Terry, English actor (died 2015)
- August 16 – Bob Balaban, American actor, director, producer and writer
- August 21 – Patty McCormack, American actress
- August 22 – David Chase, American writer, producer and director
- August 23 – Bob Peck, English actor (died 1999)
- August 24 – Cástulo Guerra, Argentine actor
- August 27 – Linda Seger, American script consultant (died 2026)
- August 28 – Jeannie Linero, American actress
- August 31 - Lee Bryant, American actress
- September 10 – Dennis Burkley, American actor (died 2013)
- September 11 – Felton Perry, American actor
- September 15
  - Roy Brocksmith, American actor (died 2001)
  - Clive Merrison, British actor
- September 17 – Bruce Spence, New Zealand actor
- September 22 – Paul Le Mat, American actor
- October 4 – Clifton Davis, American actor and singer-songwriter
- October 7 – Michael Wallis, American journalist and voice actor
- October 12 – Aurore Clément, French actress
- October 14 – Gareth Forwood, British actor (died 2007)
- October 17 – Thomas Kopache, American actor
- October 18 – Huell Howser, American actor, television personality, host, comedian (died 2013)
- October 19 – John Lithgow, American actor
- October 20 – George Wyner, American actor
- October 21 – Everett McGill, American actor
- October 23 – Hugh Fraser, English actor
- October 25 – Krzysztof Piesiewicz, Polish screenwriter (died 2026)
- October 26 – Jaclyn Smith, American actress
- October 27 – Carrie Snodgress, American actress (died 2004)
- October 30
  - Lynne Marta, American actress and singer (died 2024)
  - Henry Winkler, American actor
- October 31 – Brian Doyle-Murray, American actor and comedian
- November 2 – JD Souther, American singer-songwriter and actor (died 2024)
- November 4 – Irene Tsu, Shanghai-born American actress
- November 8 – Angela Scoular, English actress (died 2011)
- November 10
  - Terence Davies, English screenwriter and director (died 2023)
  - Douglas Gresham, American-British actor and producer
  - Mick Lally, Irish actor (died 2010)
- November 15
  - Roger Donaldson, Australian-New Zealand director, screenwriter and producer
  - Bob Gunton, American character actor
- November 18 – Walter Bobbie, American actor
- November 19 – Paula Weinstein, American producer (died 2024)
- November 21 – Goldie Hawn, American actress
- November 25 – Mary Jo Deschanel, American actress
- November 26 – Daniel Davis, American actor
- November 27 – James Avery, American actor (died 2013)
- November 28 – John Hargreaves, Australian actor (died 1996)
- November 30 – Billy Drago, American actor (died 2019)
- December 1 – Bette Midler, American actress, comedian and singer
- December 6
  - Shekhar Kapur, Indian filmmaker
  - James Naughton, American actor and director
- December 7 – Clive Russell, Scottish actor
- December 9 – Michael Nouri, American actor
- December 13 – Heather North, American actress (died 2017)
- December 17 – Ernie Hudson, American actor
- December 21 – Mari Lill, Estonian actress
- December 24
  - Nicholas Meyer, American screenwriter, director and producer
  - Steve Smith, Canadian actor, writer and comedian
- December 25
  - Rick Berman, American producer and screenwriter
  - Gary Sandy, American actor
- December 30 – Lloyd Kaufman, American director, screenwriter, producer and actor
- December 31
  - Barbara Carrera, Nicaraguan-born American actress
  - Vernon Wells, Australian character actor

== Deaths ==
- January 14 – Heinrich Schroth, 73, German actor, Dr. Hart's Diary, Melody of a Great City, Die Entlassung, Rembrandt
- February 18 – Jimmy Butler, 23, American actor
- February 23 – Reginald Barker, 58, American director, Civilization, The Bargain, The Coward, The Moonstone
- March 4
  - Lucille La Verne, 72, American actress, Snow White and the Seven Dwarfs, Abraham Lincoln, Orphans of the Storm, A Tale of Two Cities
  - Mark Sandrich, 44, American director, The Gay Divorcee, Follow the Fleet, Holiday Inn
- March 24 – F. Percy Smith, 65, English naturalist and pioneer microcinematographer, The Birth of a Flower, Secrets of Nature
- March 30 – Béla Balogh, 60, Hungarian director
- April 10 – Gloria Dickson, 27, American actress, Lady of Burlesque, They Won't Forget
- April 16 – Willie Fung, 49, Chinese-American actor, Come On, Cowboys, The Great Profile
- April 29 – Malcolm McGregor, 52, American silent screen star, Lady of the Night, The Circle, The Whispering Shadow, The Ladybird
- May 4 – Anna Dodge, 77, American actress, The Extra Girl, Ride for Your Life
- July 13 – Alla Nazimova, 66, Ukrainian-born stage and film actress, Blood and Sand, Salomé, Since You Went Away, Madame Peacock
- July 19 – George Barbier, 80, American actor, No One Man, Evenings for Sale, The Cat's-Paw, The Magnificent Dope
- August 11 – Stefan Jaracz, 61, Polish actor, Countess Walewska
- September 1 – Terry, 11, American performing Cairn Terrier, The Wizard of Oz
- November 11 – Jerome Kern, 60, American composer, Show Boat, Swing Time
- November 12 – Jaro Fürth, 74, Austrian actor, Diary of a Lost Girl, Joyless Street
- November 21 – Robert Benchley, 56, American writer and actor, Foreign Correspondent, You'll Never Get Rich, Road to Utopia
- December 25 – Russell Gleason, 37, American actor, Undercover Agent, The Covered Trailer, News Is Made at Night

== Film debuts ==
- Robert Alda – Rhapsody in Blue
- Alma Beltran – Pan-Americana
- Barbara Billingsley – Adventure
- Paul Birch – The Royal Mounted Rides Again
- Corinne Calvet – Blind Desire
- Kathryn Card – Kiss and Tell
- Mario Castellani – Romulus and the Sabines
- Jeff Chandler – Thrill of a Romance
- Steve Cochran – Booked on Suspicion
- William Conrad – Pillow to Post
- Columba Domínguez – Como México no hay dos!
- June Foray – Bring on the Girls
- Vincent Gardenia – The House on 92nd Street
- Vittorio Gassman – Inconto con Laura
- Laura Gore – Romulus and the Sabines
- Coleen Gray – State Fair
- Jane Greer – Pan-Americana
- Wanda Hendrix – Confidential Agent
- Dwayne Hickman – Captain Eddie
- John Ireland – A Walk in the Sun
- David Janssen – It's a Pleasure
- Nan Leslie – Under Western Skies
- Silvana Mangano – The Last Judgment
- Rory Mallinson – Pride of the Marines
- E. G. Marshall – The House on 92nd Street
- Zena Marshall – Caesar and Cleopatra
- Murray Matheson – The Way to the Stars
- Jack May – Give Me the Stars
- Darren McGavin – A Song to Remember
- Cameron Mitchell – What Next, Corporal Hargrove?
- Roger Moore – Perfect Strangers
- Phillip Pine – The Sailor Takes a Wife
- John Russell – A Royal Scandal
- Dean Stockwell – The Valley of Decision
- Audrey Totter – Main Street After Dark
- Howard Vernon – Boule de Suif
