= List of French films of 1945 =

A list of films produced in France in 1945.

Title	Director	Cast	Genre	Notes
Le 6 juin à l'aube	Jean Grémillon		Documentary	
Alone in the Night	Christian Stengel	Bernard Blier, Sophie Desmarets, Jacques Pills	Crime	
The Bellman	Christian-Jaque	Fernand Ledoux, Renée Faure, Madeleine Robinson	Horror	
Bifur 3	Maurice Cam	René Dary, Raymond Aimos, Martine Carol	Drama	
The Black Cavalier	Gilles Grangier	Georges Guétary, Mila Parély, Jean Tissier	Historical	
Blind Desire	Jean Delannoy	Edwige Feuillère, Jean-Louis Barrault, Jean Wall	Drama	
Blondine	Henri Mahé	Georges Marchal, Michèle Philippe, Nicole Maurey	Fantasy	
Boule de suif	Christian-Jaque	Micheline Presle, Berthe Bovy	Historical drama	
Box of Dreams	Yves Allégret, Jean Choux	Viviane Romance, Henri Guisol, Frank Villard	Comedy	
Les Cadets de l'océan	Jean Dréville	Jean Pâqui, Blanchette Brunoy, Jean Claudio	Comedy	
A Cage of Nightingales	Jean Dréville	Noël-Noël, Micheline Francey, René Génin	Drama	
Le cavalier noir	Gilles Grangier	Georges Guétary, Mila Parély, Jean Tissier	Historical	
Children of Paradise	Marcel Carné	Arletty, Jean-Louis Barrault	Romantic drama	Screenplay nominated for Oscar
Les dames du Bois de Boulogne	Robert Bresson	Paul Bernard, María Casares	Romantic drama	
La Fiancée des ténèbres	Serge de Poligny	Pierre Richard-Willm, Jany Holt	Horror	
Dorothy Looks for Love	Edmond T. Gréville	Suzy Carrier, Claude Dauphin, Jules Berry	Comedy	
The Eleventh Hour Guest	Maurice Cloche	Jean Tissier, Blanchette Brunoy, Roger Pigaut	Mystery	
Farandole	André Zwoboda	André Luguet, Lise Delamare, Gaby Morlay	Comedy	
Father Goriot	Robert Vernay	Pierre Renoir, Claude Génia, Lise Delamare	Historical	
Father Serge	Lucien Ganier-Raymond	Jacques Dumesnil, Mila Parély, Marcel Herrand	Historical	
François Villon	André Zwoboda	Serge Reggiani, Henri Crémieux	Historical	
Girl with Grey Eyes	Jean Faurez	Fernand Ledoux, Claude Génia, Paul Bernard	Drama	
The Great Pack	Jean de Limur	Jacques Dumesnil, Aimé Clariond, Jacqueline Porel	Drama	
Hanged Man's Farm	Jean Dréville	Charles Vanel, Alfred Adam, Claudine Dupuis	Drama	
The Last Judgment	René Chanas	Raymond Bussières, Jean Davy	Drama	
The Last Metro	Maurice de Canonge	Gaby Morlay, Alexandre Rignault	Crime	
Mademoiselle X	Pierre Billon	Madeleine Sologne, André Luguet, Ketti Gallian	Drama	
Majestic Hotel Cellars	Richard Pottier	Albert Prejean, Suzy Prim	Crime	
My First Love	André Berthomieu	Jacqueline Delubac, Aimé Clariond	Comedy drama	
Naïs	Raymond Leboursier	Fernandel, Jacqueline Pagnol, Raymond Pellegrin	Comedy drama	
Pamela	Pierre de Hérain	Fernand Gravey, Renée Saint-Cyr	Historical	
Paris Frills	Jacques Becker	Raymond Rouleau, Micheline Presle	Drama	
Resistance	André Berthomieu	Yvonne Gaudeau, Pierre Renoir	Drama	
La route du bagne	Léon Mathot	Viviane Romance, Lucien Coëdel	Historical	
Secret Documents	Léo Joannon	Marie Déa, Raymond Rouleau, Hugo Haas	Spy thriller	
St. Val's Mystery	René Le Hénaff	Fernandel, Jean Davy, Marcel Carpentier, Marcel Pérès	Comedy	
Trente et Quarante	Gilles Grangier	Georges Guétary, André Alerme, Martine Carol	Musical comedy	
La Vie de Bohème	Marcel L'Herbier	María Denis, Louis Jourdan, Suzy Delair	Drama	Co-production with Italy

== See also ==
- 1945 in France
