= Australian Associated Press =

Australian news agency

Australian Associated Press Ltd
- Type: Not-for-profit
- Industry: News agency
- Founded: 1935; 91 years ago
- Founder: Keith Murdoch
- Headquarters: 30-32 Wentworth Avenue, Surry Hills, New South Wales, Australia
- Key people: Emma Cowdroy, CEO; Andrew Drummond, Editor-in-chief
- Products: AAP News; AAP FactCheck; AAP Photos
- Revenue: $13,735,646 (2024)
- Operating income: $26,491,699 (2024)
- Net income: $3,238,107 (2024)
- Total assets: $13,739,851 (2024)
- Total equity: $7,399,338 (2024)
- Number of employees: 130 (2025)
- Website: aap.com.au

Australian Associated Press Ltd (AAP, stylised in lowercase in the logo) is an Australian news agency. It was founded in 1935 by Keith Murdoch.

AAP employs around 90 journalists who work in bureaus in all states and territories of Australia except the Northern Territory. It also maintains correspondents in New Zealand and London as well as a network of contributors from the US, Europe, Asia and Africa. AAP's domestic news coverage is complemented by alliances with the major international news agencies.

AAP's main focus is on breaking news but is also known for its court reporting, sport, political coverage, feature stories, and photographs. It also produces video and visual explainers. AAP is one of the few remaining non-government newswires in the world.

== History ==
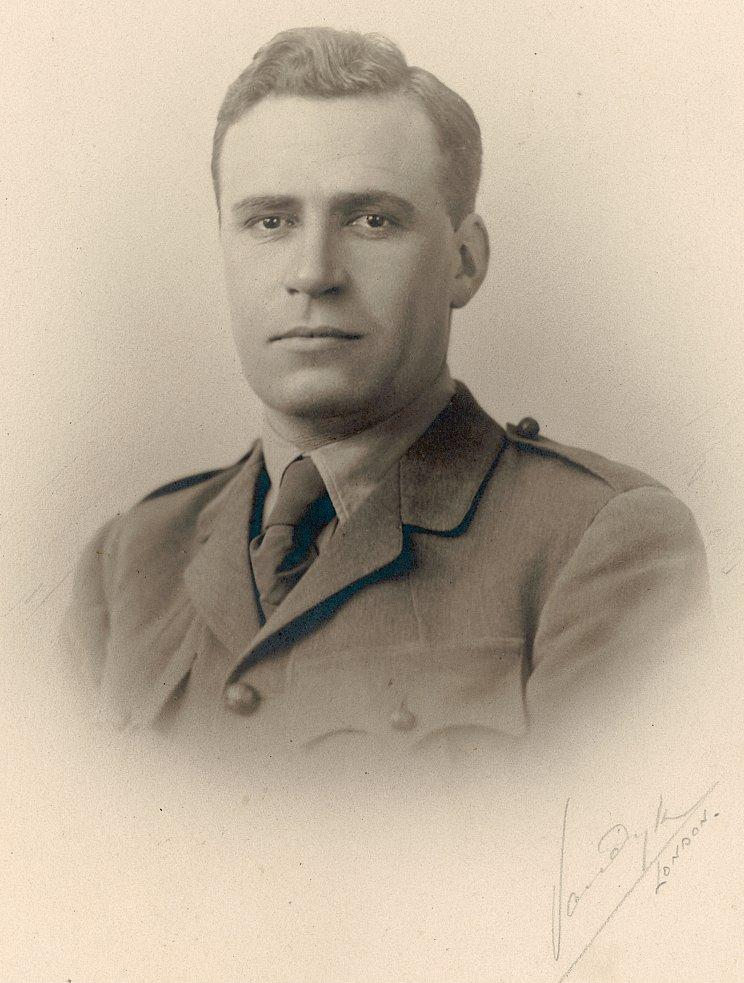
Keith Murdoch, who led the merger to form the AAP

Australia was first linked to international telegraph services by a submarine cable that linked Java to Darwin, which was laid by the British-Australian Telegraph Company, and completed on 18 November 1871. The Eastern states were connected through Adelaide on the completion of the Australian Overland Telegraph Line in 1872. As a result, the time it took to transmit news from Europe to Australia was dramatically reduced, having previously taken weeks or months to arrive via post on ships, news could now be transmitted in just hours by telegraph. Anticipating that the cost of sending messages would be high, the Melbourne newspaper The Argus formed an association with The Sydney Morning Herald, creating an agreement with the Reuters news agency for the transmission of news to Australia. This group successfully lobbied the Government of Victoria to pass the first copyright legislation of its kind in the world in 1871, protecting news material transmitted electronically for 24 hours from its first publication.

For a decade prior to 1895, three organisations supplied overseas news to Australia, The Argus group, The Age group, and the Reuters telegraph agency. In 1895, these services merged into the Australian Press Association, which had an exclusive contract with Reuters for its foreign newswire service. A 1909 Senate inquiry found that the association was a monopolistic cartel, and financed a short-lived alternative service. A competitor was established in 1911, called the United Cable Service, which competed for exclusive access to Reuters' foreign newswire service. Initially serving The Sun and The Herald, the service drew on the London newspaper The Times, and would be headed by Keith Murdoch from 1915 to 1921. The Australian Press Association and the United Cable Service agreed on an arrangement for shared access in 1926. In the early 1930s they set up an 'omnibus' service, dividing routine work like court cases and ship movements. When several of the newspapers who were part of the Australian Press Association folded, the two services began discussions on merging. In 1935, Murdoch brokered a merger between the two competitors to cut down costs, which established the Australian Associated Press as a not-for-profit cooperative with 14 newspaper shareholders. The AAP had an initial staff of 12, with London and New York bureaus. Murdoch became the AAP's first chairman, and would serve until 1940. Its charter laid out that the service was to provide:

"the most accurate and most searching information of all the world's activities and thought without any tendency toward or opportunity for the exercise of political partisanship or bias".

The AAP initially only functioned to provide overseas news to the Australian media, as major newspapers at the time had long-standing groups for local news syndication. In 1947, the agency became a shareholder in the Reuters telegraph agency, providing the AAP with windfall profits as well as representation on the Reuters board. Reuters sent British journalist Duncan Percy Hooper on secondment to AAP and after a year he was appointed AAP's first Editor in September 1949 and later General Manager. On March 31st 1977, Hooper retired as General Manager succeeded by Lee Casey then Assistant General Manager. In addition to its initial bureaux in London and New York, in the 1950s the AAP partnered with the Reuters telegraph agency to post AAP-Reuters correspondents in Asia. In the 1970s, the AAP began to offer federal parliamentary reporting from Canberra as well as court, sports, racing and stock market reporting. By 1972 the AAP had correspondents in Beijing, Los Angeles, Port Moresby, Saigon (today Ho Chi Minh City), Singapore, Suva and Wellington, as well as all Australian states and territories. At this time the AAP experienced a large growth in its newsroom, from 40 journalists in 1970 to 120 in 1980, and as a result of the AAP's high-pressured environment there was also a high turnover of around 1000 journalists in that period.

The AAP launched a full domestic news service in 1980. It was also in the 1980s that the AAP switched from its not-for-profit model to become a commercial service. An attempt to take over the AAP by News Corp, now led by Keith Murdoch's son Rupert Murdoch, by buying half of the shares of the then other largest shareholder Fairfax in 1988 was not allowed to proceed by the Trade Practices Commission. After 60 years of continuous reporting in the country, the AAP shut its bureau in Papua New Guinea in 2014, AAP's departure from the country was criticised by academics and members of the local media for diminishing the quality and quantity of news about Papua New Guinea which made it to Australia. The AAP also closed down its Jakarta office in September 2017 after 35 years, opting to operate its Asia desk from Australia by using international newswires and freelance journalists. In June 2018, the AAP cut its editorial team by 25 staff, around 10% of its then around 220 person editorial personnel. After posting a $10.45 million loss in 2018, it achieved a $929,000 profit in 2019.

=== New Zealand Newswire ===
After the closure of the AAP's New Zealand counterpart the New Zealand Press Association on 31 August 2011, the AAP launched a New Zealand Newswire (NZN) division on 5 September 2011 with offices in Auckland, Wellington and Christchurch. NZN employed 14 journalists split across Auckland and Wellington. NZN closed its digital news video team in September 2017. The AAP shut down its NZ Newswire division on 27 April 2018, and it was the final independent news agency in New Zealand to shut down, with the AAP retaining two full-time journalists in New Zealand.

=== AAP 2.0 ===
On 20 March 2020, it was announced that AAP's shareholders had decided to break up and shut down the newswire, saying that the service had become unsustainable in competition with free online content. However, before the service closed in June, AAP was bought by a consortium of impact investors and philanthropists led by Peter Tonagh, a former chief of News Corp and Foxtel. The group said they were motivated by a desire to support media diversity, and included Nick Harrington, philanthropist John McKinnon, Fred Woollard the managing director of Samuel Terry Asset Management, and Kylie Charlton the managing director of Australian Impact Investments. The group was made up of 35 investors from five states. It was reported that the sale was made for the price of $1. In the year prior to its sale and restructure, the AAP reported a loss of $10 million, $5.4 million of that being from the newswire service.

The service was relaunched as a not-for-profit on 1 August 2020, under the same name, but has been referred to as 'AAP 2.0' when making the distinction from the previous organisation. The newswire was bought by Acta Diurna AAP Limited. It was later renamed Australian Associated Press Limited. The AAP's editor Andrew Drummond remained in the role, Emma Cowdroy was appointed CEO after serving as the AAP's senior legal counsel, making her the only woman at the head of a news agency internationally. Jonty Low was appointed to chair of the AAP board, becoming the first woman to hold the role, as well as the first board chair without a media background. Peter Tonagh became a member of the AAP's board. Nick Harrington joined AAP's executive team as head of strategy and development, a position he resigned from on 21 September 2020. After relaunching with fewer staff and more infrequent coverage, the AAP asked its existing customers to transition their contracts to the new company at the same rates.

== Operations ==
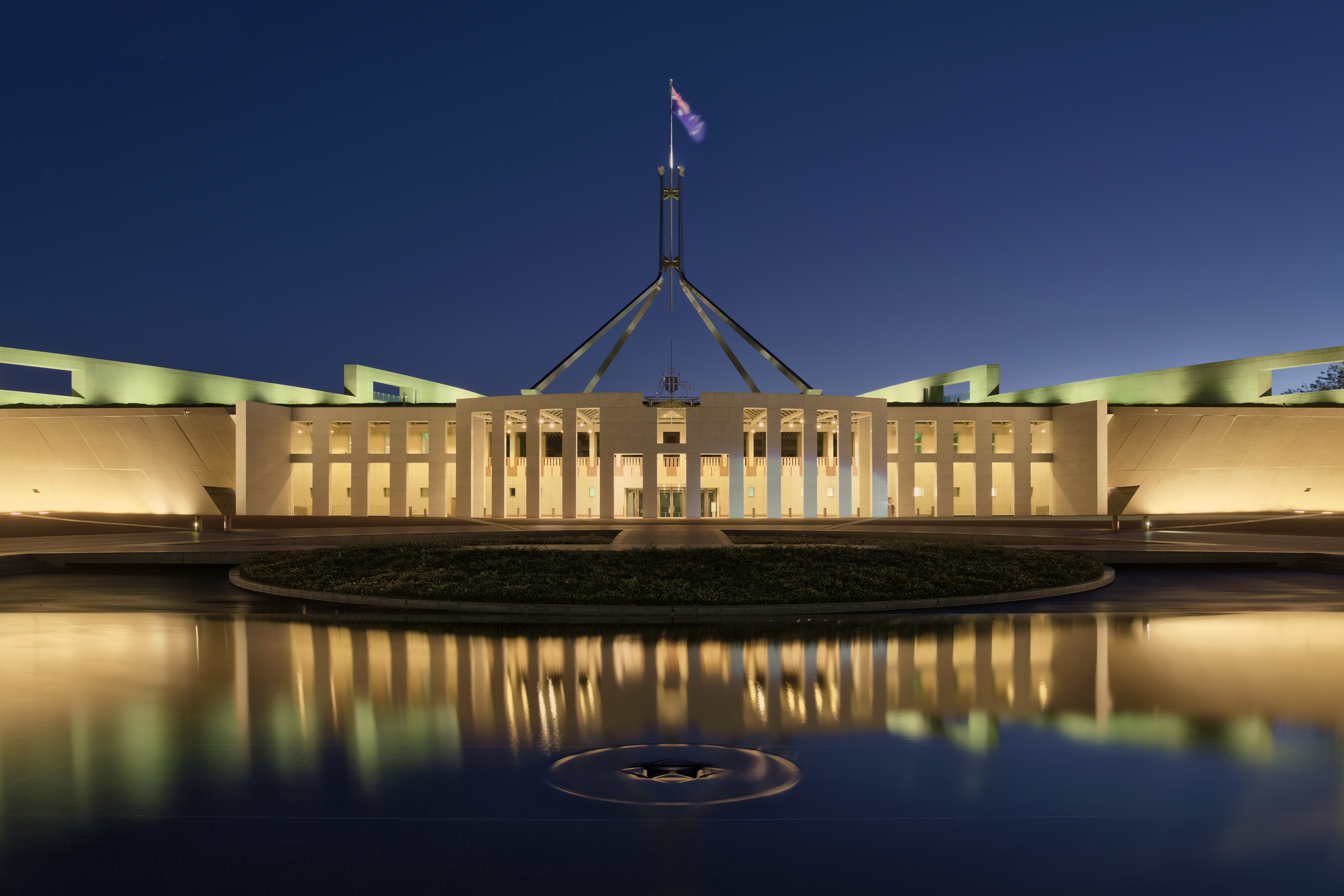
Parliament House Canberra

While news outlets initially sourced content from the AAP predominantly for foreign news and war reporting, they became increasingly reliant on the service for domestic and breaking news. It has been noted that all major newspapers once reported from Canberra's parliamentary press gallery, but in recent times often only AAP and ABC reporters were present. As a result, the AAP is considered the silent partner of Australian news outlets.

By the 2010s, it became common practice for newspapers to republish AAP copy, with minor edits and sometimes verbatim, sometimes including an 'AAP' byline and at times omitting one. This practice of publishing AAP, and other newswire, copy with little to no changes has been referred to as 'churnalism'. Content from the AAP is particularly prevalent on online news sites, as a way to cut down costs. A 2009 study found that the online breaking news sections of The Daily Telegraph and The Age, were more than half unchanged AAP reports, with the remainder predominantly sourced from international newswires, and suggested errors in AAP reporting are spread and republished in a homogeneous news environment. A 2013 study found that when the AAP reported on media relations output like press releases, it most often included little change from the original source, and as a result many newspapers were publishing media release content 'recycled' through the AAP.

After the AAP's 2020 sale and relaunch, its staff was reduced to around 80 editorial positions, and around 10 additional management, IT and support roles. On 5 September 2020, Emma Cowdroy the new chief executive of the AAP admitted that the company was facing significant financial challenges since its relaunch as a not-for-profit; this came about as a result of clients signing on for shorter periods awaiting the entrance of NCA Newswire, a new competitor owned by News Corp Australia a former large shareholder in the AAP, into the market when the companies non-compete clause ends in February 2021. The company appealed for crowd-funding donation from the public. The company also applied for a grant from the Public Interest News Gathering fund which had been started by the federal government, on 18 September 2020 it was announced that the AAP would receive $5 million in funds from the federal government.

== Services ==
In addition to their main newswire service, AAP also currently operates FactCheck a fact-checking service which is accredited by the Poynter Institute's International Fact-Checking Network. FactCheck has a partnership with Facebook to verify content posted on the social media site.

=== Past ===
The AAP established AAPT, a telecommunications division offering long-distance voice and data services in 1991, which was spun off and sold to Telecom New Zealand in 2000. It was sold again to TPG Telecom in 2013. In the 1970s the AAP began its 'Formguide' service, publishing horse racing information. In the 1980s it established 'MediaNet', a service for distributing press releases among journalists. The AAP bought 'Pagemasters' a sub-editing business in 2002 from Bruce Davidson.

As part of AAP's sale and relaunch in 2020, several divisions of the agency were spun off and retained by the agency's prior owners Nine Entertainment, News Corp Australia, Seven West Media and Australian Community Media. This included 'Medianet', its media planning and public relations service; 'Mediaverse', a service for research and analysis of media; 'ConnectWeb', a directory service for biographical data; 'Pagemasters', a digital publishing and design service; and 'Megaform', which provides information about horse racing. The services were housed under the umbrella of a new company called Mediality, employing 130 staff, 95 being full-time roles, with the head office in Sydney moving into the News Corp Australia Building. Bruce Davidson, the former CEO of the AAP became the CEO of Mediality.

== Ownership ==
In March 2020, AAP announced that they would cease trading in June of that year. In May 2020, a consortium headed by former News Corp executive Peter Tonagh entered negotiations to buy AAP. The sale was completed in June 2020 and was relaunched in August 2020. The AAP newswire was acquired by an independent, non-partisan Australian not-for-profit organisation in June 2020. As a not-for-profit organisation it does not have owners or shareholders. The exact ownership of the AAP since its 2020 sale and relaunch are unclear, as the terms of sale have not been released.

=== Past ===
From 2012 to 2020 when AAP become a non-profit, the AAP was jointly owned by 12 of the original 13 newspaper shareholders which established it in 1935, with those newspapers now being owned by various media conglomerates. Prior to its 2020 sale and relaunch the AAP was predominantly owned by: Nine Entertainment (45%), and News Corp Australia (45%), with Seven West Media and Australian Community Media as minor shareholders. News Corp and Nine formerly contributed in excess of $10 million annually, with minor shareholders Seven West Media and Australian Community Media contributing more than $1 million.

== See also ==
- Mass media in Australia
- Associated Press
