= 1945 in British television =

This is a list of British television-related events from 1945.

== Events ==
British television did not broadcast in 1945. Television had been suspended since 1939 for the duration of the Second World War, due to fears that the signals would help German bombers. Although the war ended in 1945, television did not restart during the year. Television broadcasting resumed in June 1946.

== Births ==
- 21 January – Martin Shaw, actor
- 4 February – Tony Haygarth, actor (died 2017)
- 13 February – Simon Schama, historian
- 16 February – Jeremy Bulloch, actor (died 2020)
- 7 April – Martyn Lewis, Welsh broadcast journalist and television presenter
- 10 April – James Bate, actor (died 1992)
- 21 April – Diana Darvey, actress, singer and dancer (died 2000)
- 14 May – Francesca Annis, actress
- 25 May – Dave Lee Travis, disc jockey and television presenter
- 2 June – David Dundas, musician, actor and television composer
- 3 June – Bill Paterson, Scottish actor
- 7 June – Steve Jones, disc jockey and television presenter
- 15 June – Nicola Pagett, Egyptian-born actress (died 2021)
- 10 July – John Motson, football commentator (died 2023)
- 26 July – Helen Mirren, actress
- 1 August – Laila Morse, actress (EastEnders)
- 5 August – Martin Lambie-Nairn, designer (died 2020)
- 6 August – Ron Jones, director (died 1993)
- 14 August – Tony Scannell, actor (The Bill) (died 2020)
- 14 September – Martin Tyler, football commentator
- 14 October – Lesley Joseph, actress
- 17 October – Jimmy Cricket (James Mulgrew), Northern Ireland-born comedian (died 2026)
- 30 December – Davy Jones, English-born pop singer (The Monkees) (died 2012)

== See also ==
- 1945 in British music
- 1945 in the United Kingdom
- List of British films of 1945
