= 1945 in British music =

This is a summary of 1945 in music in the United Kingdom.

== Events ==
- 7 June – First performance of Peter Grimes in Sadler's Wells, London.
- 29 June – William Walton opposes a proposal that the British Council should support a complete recording of Peter Grimes, suggesting that this should be discussed "at a calmer moment when the wildly hysterical & uncritical eulogies & general 'ballyhoo' have somewhat abated, & the true merits of the work can be properly assessed."
- 1 July – For its 50th season the Proms returns from its wartime retreat in Bedford back to the Royal Albert Hall in London. The First Night concert includes William Walton’s Memorial Fanfare for Henry Wood, as well as a performance of Elgar’s Cockaigne (In London Town).
- July – Benjamin Britten and Yehudi Menuhin tour Germany to perform concerts in liberated concentration camps, including Belsen.
- 26 July – Composer Ernest John Moeran marries cellist Peers Coetmore.
- Unknown date – Walter Legge founds the Philharmonia Orchestra.

== Popular music ==
- Noël Coward – "Matelot", "Nina (from Argentina)", from Coward's musical Sigh No More
- Dorothy Squires – "The Gypsy" (Billy Reid)

== Classical music: new works ==
- Benjamin Britten – The Young Person's Guide to the Orchestra
- Pamela Harrison – String Trio
- Michael Tippett – Symphony No. 1
- William Walton – Memorial Fanfare for Henry Wood

== Opera ==
- Benjamin Britten – Peter Grimes

== Film and Incidental music ==
- Richard Addinsell – Blithe Spirit
- Georges Auric – Dead of Night
- Ralph Vaughan Williams – The Story of a Flemish Farm

== Musical theatre ==
- 21 April – Perchance To Dream (Music, Lyrics and Book: Ivor Novello) – London production opens at the London Hippodrome and runs for 1022 performances.
- 28 August – Noël Coward's revue Sigh No More opens at the Piccadilly Theatre.

== Musical films ==
- Flight from Folly, directed by Herbert Mason, starring Patricia Kirkwood and Hugh Sinclair. The Daily Mirror described the film as a "neatly made and tuneful comedy" with praise for Kirkwood's "vivacious personality and talent".
- Home Sweet Home, directed by John E. Blakeley, starring Frank Randle, with music by Percival Mackey.
- I'll Be Your Sweetheart – directed by Val Guest, starring Margaret Lockwood, Vic Oliver and Michael Rennie.
- Waltz Time, directed by Paul L. Stein, starring Carol Raye, Peter Graves and Patricia Medina, with music by Hans May.

== Births ==
- 10 January – Rod Stewart, singer and songwriter
- 19 January – Trevor Williams, English singer-songwriter and bass player (Audience and The Nashville Teens)
- 25 January – Dave Walker, English singer and guitarist (Savoy Brown and Fleetwood Mac)
- 26 January – Jacqueline du Pré, cellist (died 1987)
- 30 March – Eric Clapton, guitarist, singer and songwriter
- 25 February – Elkie Brooks, singer
- 14 April – Ritchie Blackmore, guitarist
- 19 May – Pete Townshend (The Who)
- 29 May – Gary Brooker (Procol Harum)
- 24 June – Colin Blunstone, singer
- 25 June – Labi Siffre, singer-songwriter
- 28 June – David Knights, bass player and producer (Procol Harum)
- 19 August – Ian Gillan, singer
- 5 September – Al Stewart, singer-songwriter
- 7 September – Max Boyce, singer-songwriter
- 8 September – Kelly Groucutt, British bassist (died 2009)
- 24 September – John Rutter, composer
- 26 September – Bryan Ferry, singer and songwriter
- 5 October – Brian Connolly, vocalist (Sweet) (died 1997)
- 28 October
  - Elton Dean, saxophonist and keyboard player (died 2006)
  - Wayne Fontana, singer (died 2020)
- 30 November – Stan Sulzmann, saxophonist and educator
- 3 December – Paul Nicholas, actor and singer
- 24 December – Lemmy, singer and bassist (Motörhead, Hawkwind) (died 2015)
- 30 December – Davy Jones, singer and actor (died 2012)

== Deaths ==
- 8 February – James Campbell McInnes, baritone singer and teacher, 71
- 13 March – Herbert Bedford, composer and artist, 78
- 12 April – Maurice Besly, organist, composer and conductor, 57
- 24 April – Hubert Bath, film composer, 61
- 15 May – Kenneth J. Alford, composer of military marches, 64
- 21 May – Hugh Enes Blackmore, singer and actor, 81
- 15 August – Frederic Lord, organist, conductor and composer, 58
- 19 November – Helen Hopekirk, pianist and composer, 89
- 15 December – Tobias Matthay, pianist and composer, 87

== See also ==
- 1945 in British television
- 1945 in the United Kingdom
- List of British films of 1945
