= 3rd Golden Globe Awards =

Film award ceremony in 1946

Coordinates: 34°6′8.6″N 118°19′40.2″W

- Announced on: March 6, 1946
- Presented on: March 30, 1946
- Site: Knickerbocker Hotel

Highlights
- Best Picture: The Lost Weekend
- Most awards: The Lost Weekend (3)

The 3rd Golden Globe Awards, honoring the best achievements in 1945 filmmaking, were announced March 6 and held on March 30, 1946 at the Knickerbocker Hotel (Los Angeles) in Los Angeles, California.

== Winners ==
=== Best Picture ===
- The Lost Weekend directed by Billy Wilder

=== Best Actor in a Leading Role ===
- Ray Milland – The Lost Weekend

=== Best Actress in a Leading Role ===
- Ingrid Bergman – The Bells of St. Mary's

=== Best Performance by an Actor in a Supporting Role in a Motion Picture ===
- J. Carrol Naish – A Medal for Benny

=== Best Performance by an Actress in a Supporting Role in a Motion Picture ===
- Angela Lansbury – The Picture of Dorian Gray

=== Best Director-Motion Picture ===
- Billy Wilder – The Lost Weekend

=== Best Film Promoting International Understanding ===
- The House I Live In

== See also ==
- Hollywood Foreign Press Association
- 18th Academy Awards
- 1945 in film
