= Linda Seger =

American author and screenwriting consultant (1945–2026)

- Born: Linda Sue Seger; August 27, 1945; Peshtigo, Wisconsin, U.S.
- Died: February 16, 2026 (aged 80); Cascade, Colorado, U.S.
- Occupations: Author, screenwriting consultant
- Years active: 1981–2026

Linda Sue Seger (August 27, 1945 – February 16, 2026) was an American author and screenwriting consultant. She is best known for her books on screenwriting.

== Education and career ==
Seger grew up in Peshtigo, Wisconsin. She received an undergraduate degree from Colorado College in 1967. She went on to receive an MA degree from the Pacific School of Religion on Religion in Arts in 1973, and a Th.D in Drama and Theology from the affiliated Graduate Theological Union in 1976.

She was the author of several books on the subject of screenwriting. She also worked as a script consultant, and had consulted on more than 80 produced films and television episodes until her retirement in 2020. In addition to books on screenwriting, she wrote several books on themes around spirituality and religion.

== Death ==
Seger died of breast cancer in Cascade, Colorado, on February 16, 2026, at the age of 80.

== Selected books ==
=== On screenwriting ===
- Seger, Linda (2017). Writing Subtext: What Lies Beneath. Studio City, CA: Michael Wiese Productions. ISBN 978-1-61593-258-0.
- Seger, Linda (2010). Making a Good Script Great (3rd ed.). Beverly Hills, CA: Silman-James Press. ISBN 978-1-935247-01-2. (Cited over 250 times according to Google Scholar.)
- Seger, Linda (2008). And the Best Screenplay Goes To–: Learning from the Winners: Sideways, Shakespeare in Love, Crash. Studio City, CA: Michael Wiese Productions. ISBN 978-1-932907-38-4.
- Seger, Linda; Whetmore, Edward J. (2004). From Script to Screen: the Collaborative Art of Filmmaking. Hollywood, CA: Lone Eagle. ISBN 978-1-58065-054-0.
- Seger, Linda (1996). When Women Call the Shots: The Developing Power And Influence Of Women In Television And Film. New York: Henry Holt & Co. ISBN 978-0-8050-3891-0.

=== On religion and spirituality ===
- Seger, Linda (2006). Jesus Rode a Donkey: Why Republicans Don't Have the Corner on Christ. Avon, Mass: Adams Media. ISBN 978-1-59337-619-2.
