= List of British films of 1945 =

A list of films produced in the United Kingdom in 1945:

== 1945 ==
Title	Director	Cast	Genre	Notes
1945
29 Acacia Avenue	Henry Cass	Gordon Harker, Betty Balfour, Carla Lehmann	Comedy	
The Agitator	John Harlow	William Hartnell, Mary Morris, Moore Marriott	Drama	
Blithe Spirit	David Lean	Rex Harrison, Constance Cummings, Kay Hammond	Comedy	Noël Coward's play
Brief Encounter	David Lean	Celia Johnson, Trevor Howard, Stanley Holloway	Romantic drama	Number 2 in the list of BFI Top 100 British films
Caesar and Cleopatra	Gabriel Pascal	Claude Rains, Vivien Leigh, Stewart Granger	Historical drama	Based on George Bernard Shaw's play
Dead of Night	Charles Crichton, Basil Dearden	Michael Redgrave, Mervyn Johns, Googie Withers	Horror	Anthology film
Don Chicago	Maclean Rogers	Jackie Hunter, Eddie Gray, Claud Allister	Comedy	
The Echo Murders	John Harlow	David Farrar, Dennis Price, Julien Mitchell	Thriller	
Flight from Folly	Herbert Mason	Patricia Kirkwood, Hugh Sinclair, Tamara Desni	Musical comedy	
For You Alone	Geoffrey Faithfull	Dinah Sheridan, Jimmy Hanley, Lesley Brook	Romance	
Give Me the Stars	Maclean Rogers	Leni Lynn, Will Fyffe, Jackie Hunter, Olga Lindo	Drama	
Great Day	Lance Comfort	Eric Portman, Flora Robson, Sheila Sim	Drama	
Handling Ships	Alan Crick, John Halas		Documentary/animated	First feature length British animation
Home Sweet Home	John E. Blakeley	Frank Randle, Nicolette Roeg	Musical/comedy	
I Didn't Do It	Marcel Varnel	George Formby, Billy Caryll, Hilda Mundy	Comedy/crime	
I Know Where I'm Going!	Michael Powell, Emeric Pressburger	Wendy Hiller, Roger Livesey, Pamela Brown	Romance	
I Live in Grosvenor Square	Herbert Wilcox	Anna Neagle, Rex Harrison	Romance/drama	
I'll Be Your Sweetheart	Val Guest	Margaret Lockwood, Vic Oliver	Musical	
Johnny Frenchman	Charles Frend	Tom Walls, Patricia Roc, Françoise Rosay	World War II/drama	
Journey Together	John Boulting	Richard Attenborough, Jack Watling	War	
Kiss the Bride Goodbye	Paul L. Stein	Patricia Medina, Jimmy Hanley	Romantic comedy	
Latin Quarter	Vernon Sewell	Derrick De Marney, Joan Greenwood	Thriller	
Madonna of the Seven Moons	Arthur Crabtree	Phyllis Calvert, Stewart Granger, Patricia Roc	Drama	
The Man from Morocco	Mutz Greenbaum	Anton Walbrook, Margaretta Scott	World War II	
Meet Sexton Blake!	John Harlow	David Farrar, Manning Whiley, Dennis Arundell	Drama	
Murder in Reverse	Montgomery Tully	William Hartnell, Jimmy Hanley	Thriller	
My Ain Folk	Germain Burger	Mabel Constanduros, Moira Lister	Musical	
Old Mother Riley at Home	Oswald Mitchell	Arthur Lucan, Kitty McShane	Comedy	
Painted Boats	Charles Crichton	Jenny Laird, Robert Griffiths	Drama	
Perfect Strangers	Alexander Korda	Robert Donat, Deborah Kerr	Drama	
Pink String and Sealing Wax	Robert Hamer	Googie Withers, Gordon Jackson, Mervyn Johns	Drama	
A Place of One's Own	Bernard Knowles	James Mason, Margaret Lockwood	Drama	
The Rake's Progress	Sidney Gilliat	Rex Harrison, Lilli Palmer	Drama	
The Seventh Veil	Compton Bennett	James Mason, Ann Todd, Herbert Lom	Melodrama	
Strawberry Roan	Maurice Elvey	William Hartnell, Carol Raye	Drama	
They Were Sisters	Arthur Crabtree	James Mason, Phyllis Calvert, Dulcie Gray	Melodrama	
Twilight Hour	Paul L. Stein	Mervyn Johns, Basil Radford	Drama	
Waltz Time	Paul L. Stein	Carol Raye, Patricia Medina	Musical	
Waterloo Road	Sidney Gilliat	John Mills, Stewart Granger	Drama	
What Do We Do Now?	Charles Hawtrey	George Moon, Barry Lupino, Leslie Fuller	Comedy/musical	
The Way to the Stars	Anthony Asquith	Michael Redgrave, John Mills	World War II/drama	
The Wicked Lady	Leslie Arliss	Margaret Lockwood, James Mason	Drama	Remade in 1983
The World Owes Me a Living	Vernon Sewell	David Farrar, Judy Campbell	Drama	

== See also ==
- 1945 in British music
- 1945 in British television
- 1945 in the United Kingdom
