= Duncan Hooper =

British/Australian journalist

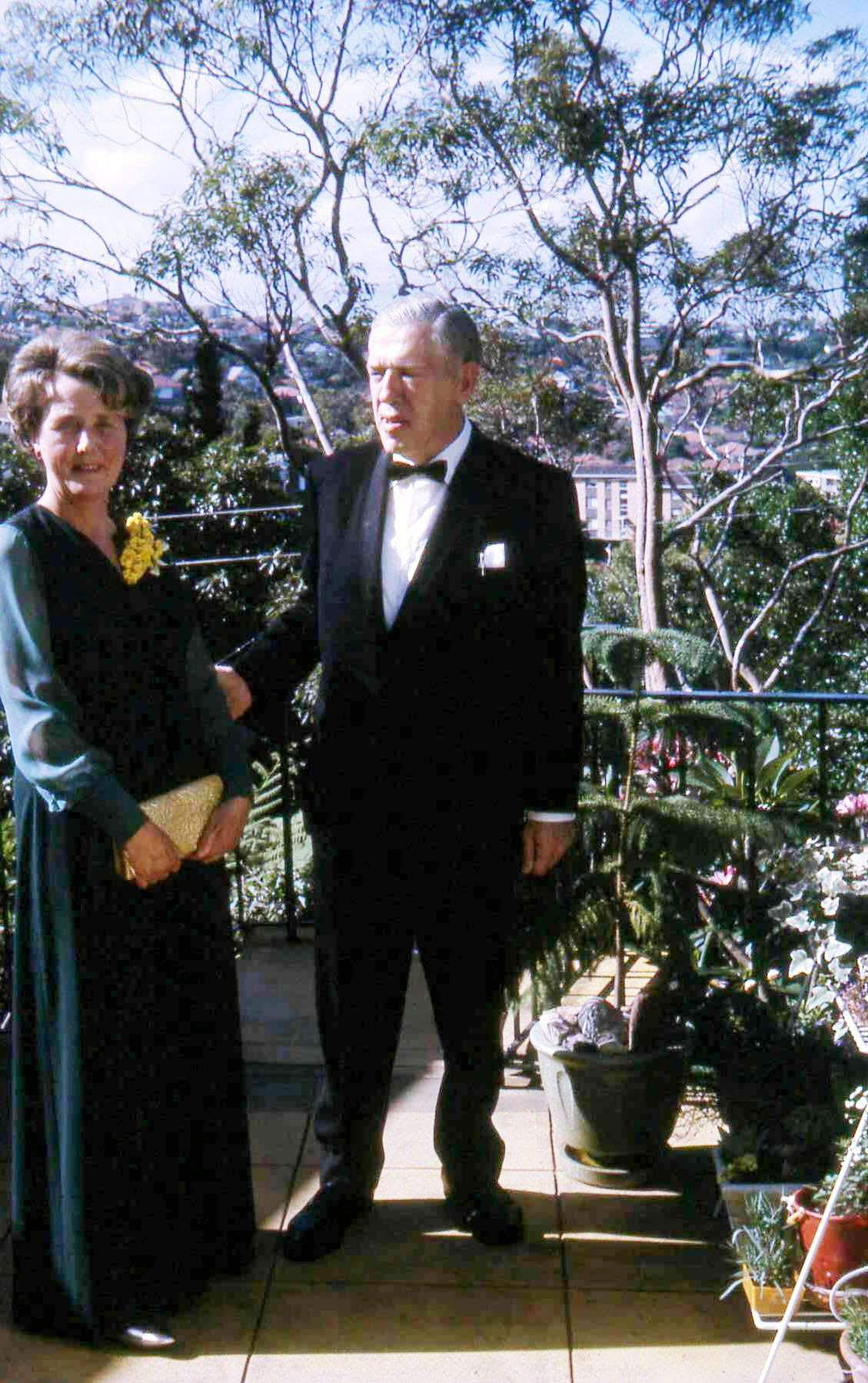
- Elsie and Duncan Hooper Mossman 1988
- Born: Duncan Percy Hooper; February 6, 1912; London, U.K.
- Died: November 1, 1990 (aged 78); Geelong, Australia
- Resting place: Saint James Anglican Church, Point Lonsdale, Australia
- Occupations: Journalist; General Manager
- Years active: 1926–1977
- Spouse: Elsie Doreen Finkl (m. 1937; died 1998)
- Children: 2

Duncan Percy Hooper, OBE, was a prominent British/Australian journalist and foreign correspondent, most notable for his service as a Reuters war correspondent during World War II and his later leadership of the Australian Associated Press (AAP).

Born in London on 6 February, 1912, Duncan Percy Hooper died in Geelong on November 1, 1990, aged 78. At the time of his death, he was a resident of Point Lonsdale.

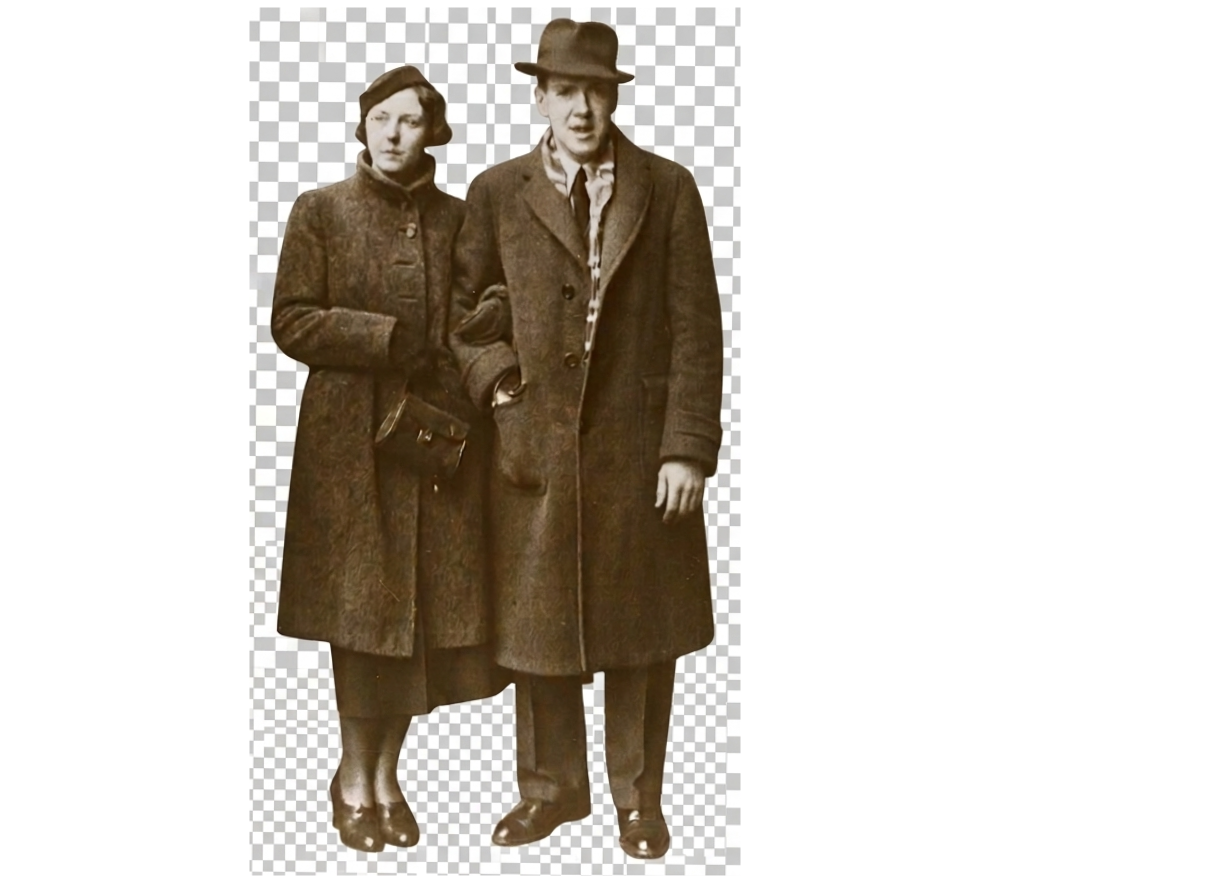
Wedding photograph of Duncan Hooper and Elsie Finkl, taken in London, January 9th, 1937.

== Foreign Correspondent - Reuters ==
=== Moscow ===
While serving as Reuters’ chief correspondent in Moscow, Duncan Hooper learned on 1 May 1945 that Joseph Goebbels had taken his own life. At a social gathering, a Soviet official approached him and remarked that it was very sad about Doctor Goebbels. Unaware of any such development, Hooper replied cautiously that it was indeed very sad. The official then disclosed the full story, explaining that the entire family had been killed: the children were put to death in the bunker, after which the parents ended their own lives.

=== Berlin ===
Reports that what were believed to be the charred remains of Adolf Hitler had been discovered in Berlin in April 1945 handed Reuters journalist Duncan Hooper a major scoop. He had entered the city from the eastern sector on 14 April. American reporters representing AP and UP were also in Berlin and learned before Hooper that Soviet forces had uncovered a body in the bunker, identified as Hitler through dental evidence.

With no direct lines of communication available from Berlin, the Americans chose to fly back to Paris in order to file their report. That decision created an unexpected opportunity for Hooper to outpace them. He located a British dispatch rider heading to the airport to catch a flight to Lübeck, the closest communications centre, some 150 miles away.

After quickly drafting his dispatch, Hooper entrusted it to the rider, promising a bottle of Scotch if it reached Lübeck. Roughly four hours later, the Reuters account was being aired by the BBC, while the American correspondents were still en route, carrying the story with them.

=== Mumbai ===
In December 1945, Hooper relocated to Mumbai (then Bombay) India to take up the position of News Editor and become head of the Reuters Bureau - Bombay. Through 1946 and 1947 he covered breaking news as British power on the subcontinent entered its final phase.

On 21 October 1946, Nehru then Vice-President of the Indian Interim Government, was involved in a violent incident in the Khyber Pass near Landi Kotal while returning from the Afghan frontier to Peshawar. Hooper was travelling with Nehru as one of several foreign correspondents.

A large group of tribesmen blocked the road, shouted anti-Nehru slogans, and hurled stones at the convoy, smashing car windows. Nehru’s vehicle, which displayed a Congress flag, became a clear target. Members of the Khyber Rifles escort took up defensive positions, and a brief gun battle followed between the troops and tribesmen. It was unclear who fired first.

Hooper was slightly injured by a stone and he took refuge in the closest car which was Nehru's transport. Nehru was unhurt despite being showered with broken glass. The escort cleared the road, and the party safely reached Landi Kotal and later Peshawar.

The incident highlighted tensions in the North-West Frontier Province during Nehru’s visit and for Hooper the dangers of covering world events as a foreign corespondent.

== AAP ==
Reuters sent Hooper on secondment to AAP in 1948 and after a year he was appointed AAP's first editor in September 1949 and later general manager. On March 31st 1977, Duncan Hooper retired as general manager succeeded by Lee Casey then assistant general manager.

== Honours ==
He was made an Officer of the Order of the British Empire (OBE) by the queen on 1 January 1968 for his services to journalism. At the time of this honour, he was a resident of Mosman, New South Wales. After his death, he was later recognised for his contribution to Australian journalism with induction into the Australian Media Hall of Fame, administered by the Melbourne Press Club.

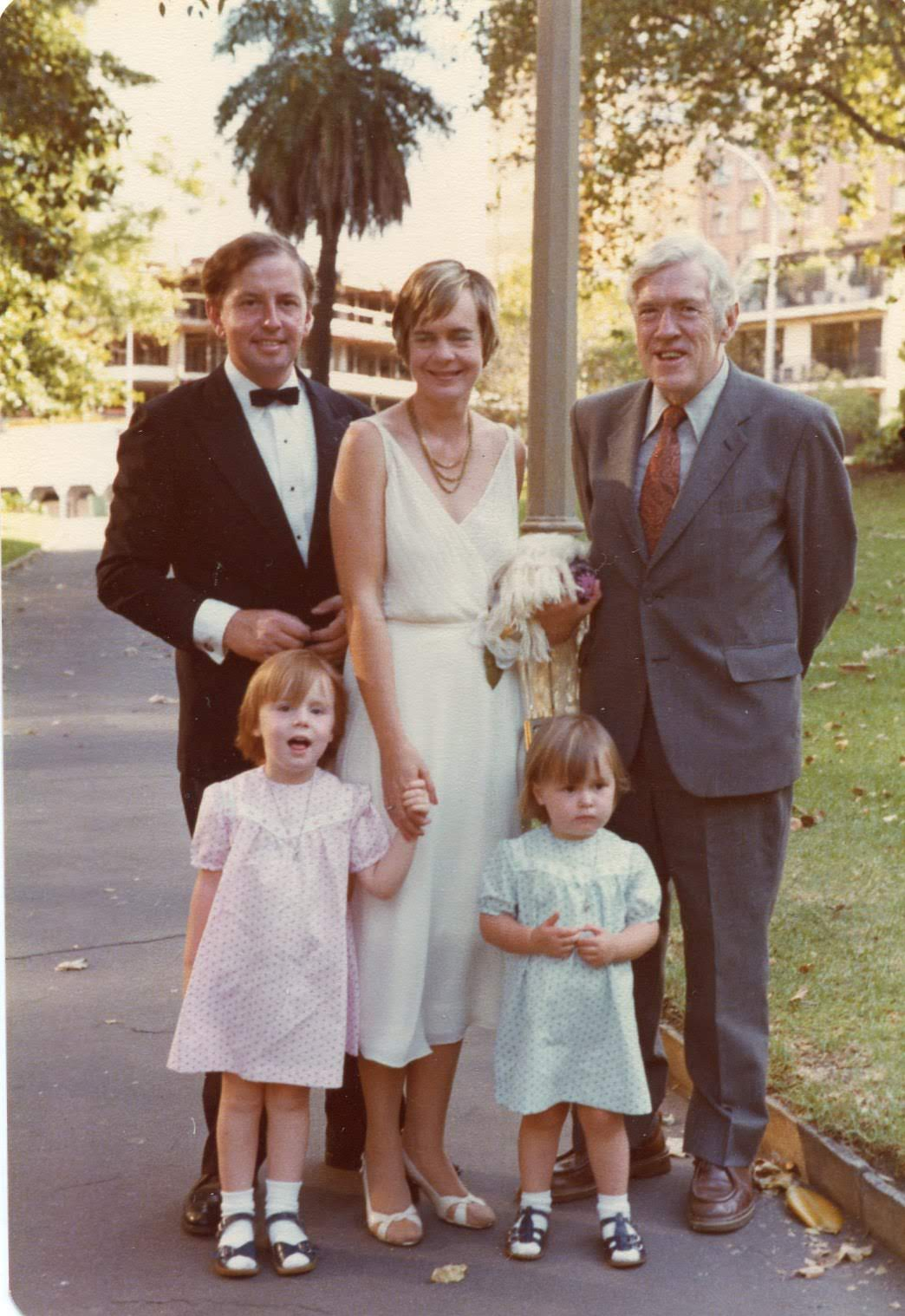
Duncan Hooper Sydney 1st March 1980
