= List of German films of 1945 =

This is a list of the most notable films produced in the Cinema of Germany in 1945 — the last year of the existence of Nazi Germany.

Title	Director	Cast	Genre	Notes
Anna Alt	Werner Klingler	Anneliese Uhlig, Will Quadflieg	Drama	
Bravo, Little Thomas	Jan Fethke	Rudolf Reiff, Elise Aulinger, Fritz Wagner	Drama	
Flüssigkeitswechselgetriebe			documentary	
Kolberg	Veit Harlan	Kristina Söderbaum, Heinrich George, Paul Wegener, Horst Caspar, Gustav Diessl, Otto Wernicke		Propaganda film. In Agfacolor
A Man Like Maximilian	Hans Deppe	Wolf Albach-Retty, Karin Hardt	Comedy	
The Noltenius Brothers	Gerhard Lamprecht	Willy Birgel, Hilde Weissner	Drama	
The Silent Guest	Harald Braun	René Deltgen, Gisela Uhlen	Crime	
Via Mala	Josef von Báky	Karin Hardt, Carl Wery, Viktor Staal	Melodrama	
The Years Pass	Günther Rittau	Heidemarie Hatheyer, Carl Kuhlmann	Drama	
