= Blind Desire =

1945 French drama film

Blind Desire (French: La Part de l'ombre) is a 1945 French drama film directed by Jean Delannoy and starring Edwige Feuillère. It was also known as La part de l'ombre. It earned admissions in France of 1,913,192.
