= 1945 in the United Kingdom =

Events from the year 1945 in the United Kingdom. This year sees the end of World War II and a landslide general election victory for the Labour Party.

== Incumbents ==
- Monarch – George VI
- Prime Minister – Winston Churchill (Coalition) (until 26 July), Clement Attlee (Labour) (starting 26 July)

== Events ==
- 2 January – General Bernard Montgomery holds a press conference at Zonhoven describing his contribution to the Battle of the Bulge.
- 23 January – announcement of the establishment of the Industrial and Commercial Finance Corporation (ICFC; predecessor of 3i) by the Bank of England and the major commercial banks to provide long-term investment funding for small and medium-sized enterprises.
- 4 February – Prime Minister Winston Churchill attends the Yalta Conference (ends 11 February).
- 13 February – the RAF Bomber Command begins the strategic bombing of Dresden in Saxony, Germany, resulting in a lethal firestorm which kills tens of thousands of civilians.
- 10 March – sixty-seven German prisoners of war tunnel their way out of Island Farm Camp 198 at Bridgend, the biggest escape attempt by German POWs in the UK during the War.
- 14 March – the RAF uses the Grand Slam bomb for the first time on the Bielefeld railway viaduct.
- 17 March – 13 people are killed and 22 injured when a lone Heinkel 111 bomber opens fire and drops bombs on people leaving a cinema in Kingston upon Hull.
- 19 March – Dennis O'Neill case: the foster father and foster mother of 12-year-old Dennis O'Neill, who died in their care on 9 January in Shropshire, are convicted of manslaughter and neglect respectively, leading to changes in provision of foster care in the UK.
- 27 March – last day of V-2 rocket attacks aimed at the UK. One hits Hughes Mansions, Stepney in East London, killing 134 and the last falls in Orpington with one fatality.
- 29 March – the last V-1 flying bomb attack on the UK takes place. The last enemy action of any kind on British soil occurs when one strikes Datchworth in Hertfordshire without any fatalities or injuries.
- 13 April – the first Scottish National Party Member of Parliament, Robert McIntyre, is elected to the Parliament of the United Kingdom following his victory at the Motherwell by-election.
- 15 April – British troops liberate the Bergen-Belsen concentration camp; Richard Dimbleby reports on it for the BBC.
- 19 April – Geoffrey Fisher enthroned as Archbishop of Canterbury.
- April – Sybil Campbell is appointed a stipendiary magistrate in London, the first woman to become a professional judge in the UK.
- 7 May – at 23:00 the SS Avondale Park is torpedoed and sunk by German submarine U-2336 off the Firth of Forth with two killed, the last British-flagged merchant ship lost to German action.

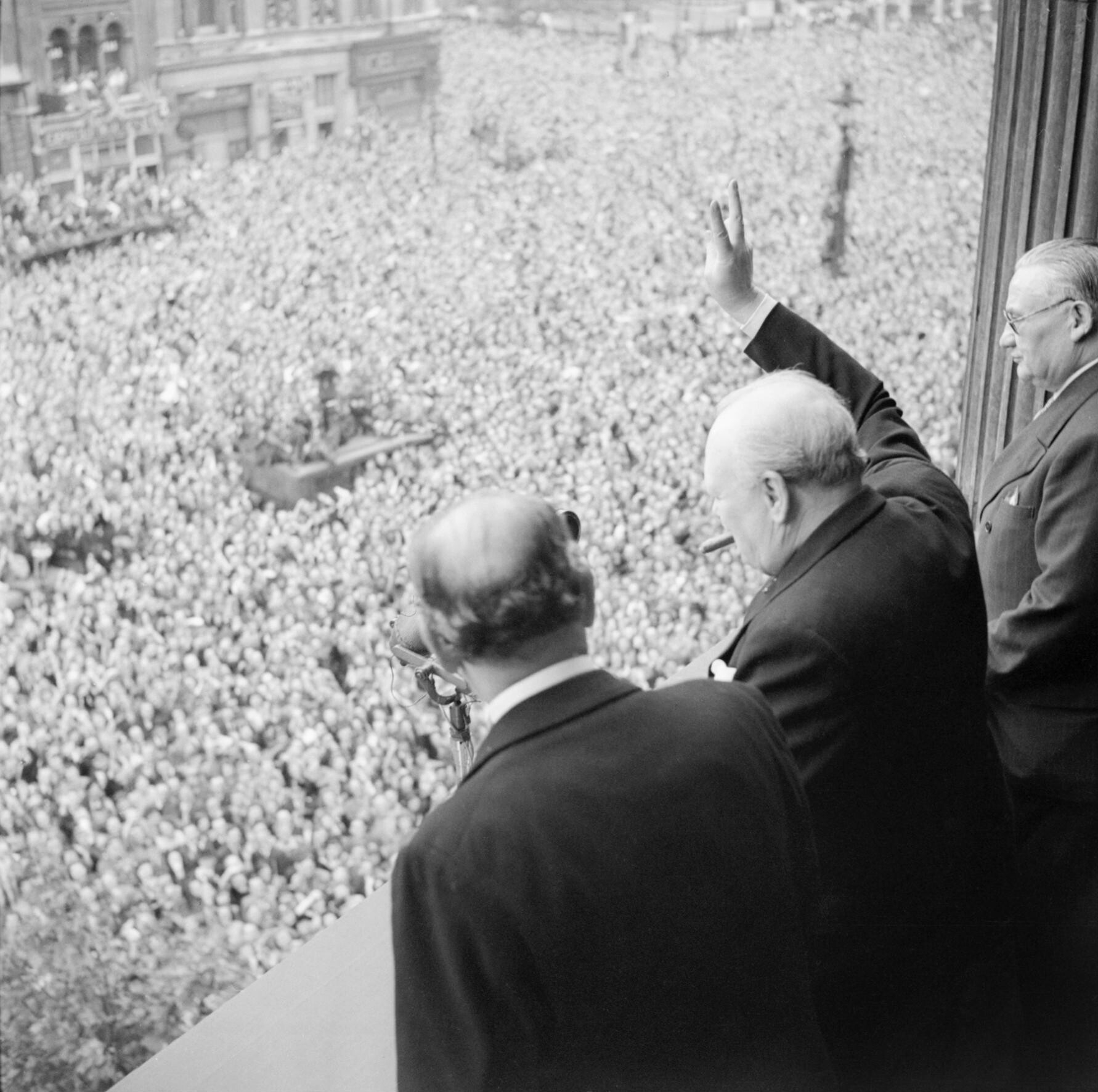
Churchill waves to the crowds on VE Day

- 8 May – eight days after the suicide of Adolf Hitler in Berlin and the collapse of Nazi rule in Europe, V-E Day is celebrated throughout the UK. Prime Minister Winston Churchill makes a victory speech and appears on the balcony of Buckingham Palace with George VI, Queen Elizabeth and Princesses Elizabeth and Margaret. Street parties take place throughout the country.
- 9 May – German forces in the Channel Islands, the only occupied part of the British Isles, surrender.
- 18 May – Operation Unthinkable: Churchill secretly requests his military chiefs of staff to consider a plan for British, American and reactivated German forces to attack the Soviet Red Army on July 1 to preserve the independence of Poland. The operation is ruled militarily unfeasible.
- 23 May – Churchill forms a "caretaker" Conservative Party administration, pending an election, officially ending the wartime Coalition government.
- 27 May – basic food ration reduced.
- 28 May – American-born Irish-raised William Joyce, known as "Lord Haw-Haw" is captured on the German border. He is later charged with high treason in London for his English-language wartime propaganda broadcasts on German radio. He is hanged in January 1946.
- 1 June – the UK takes over administration of Lebanon and Syria.
- 4 June – Churchill, in a broadcast election speech, claims that a future socialist government "would have to fall back on some form of Gestapo".
- 7 June – Benjamin Britten's opera Peter Grimes is first performed at Sadler's Wells Theatre in London with Peter Pears in the title role.
- 13 June – Council for the Encouragement of Music and the Arts renamed Arts Council of Great Britain.
- 15 June – Parliament passes:
  - The Family Allowances Act to provide payments to families with children with effect from 1946.
  - The Law Reform (Contributory Negligence) Act, allowing an injured person to claim damages even though they were partly at fault, which was previously a complete bar to a claim. The damages may be reduced to reflect the share of responsibility.
- 18 June – demobilisation of the wartime armed forces begins.
- 5 July – polling day for the first general election to be held since 1935; a few constituencies delay polling due to local Wakes weeks and the vote count is not made for another three weeks (see below) so that votes from service personnel overseas can be added to the total.
- 17 July – Potsdam Conference – the three main Allied leaders begin their final summit of the war. The meeting will end on 2 August.

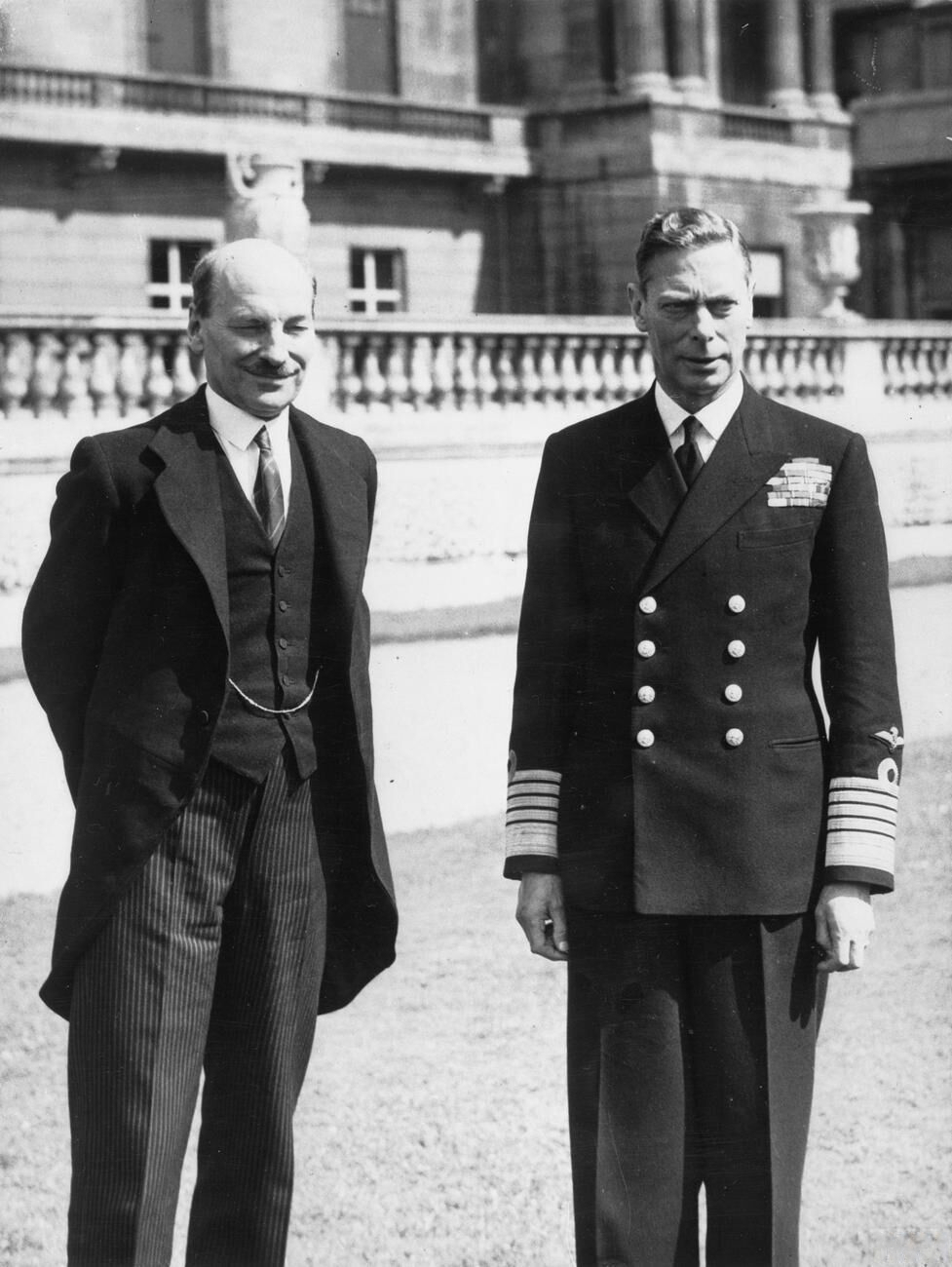
Attlee with King George VI following Labour's landslide election victory

- 26 July – general election results are announced; Winston Churchill resigns as prime minister after his Conservative Party is soundly defeated by the Labour Party, who have a majority of 146 seats, and Clement Attlee becomes the new prime minister. However, Churchill will remain as Leader of the Conservative Party, in opposition. It will be the first time that a Labour government with a majority in the House of Commons has governed Britain. Among the new Labour members of parliament is 29-year-old Harold Wilson, MP for Ormskirk in Lancashire, who will become the next Labour Prime Minister in 1964. A notable casualty of the election is Harold Macmillan, who has now lost the Stockton-on-Tees seat twice for the Conservative Party. Ernest Brown, leader of the National Liberal Party, loses his seat at Leith to Labour and Sir Archibald Sinclair, leader of the Liberal Party, comes third in the poll at Caithness and Sutherland, while their parties are reduced to 11 and 12 seats respectively; Liberal William Beveridge loses his seat. Robert McIntyre loses his newly won Scottish National Party seat. The largest number of women MPs to date is elected (41, but only 1 Conservative). On 27 July, Alfred Dobbs, newly elected as Labour MP for Smethwick, near Birmingham, is killed in a car crash. (Two other Labour MPs die before the end of the year.)
- 29 July – the BBC Light Programme radio station is launched, concentrating on the broadcasting of mainstream light music and entertainment, superseding the BBC General Forces Programme within the UK using its longwave frequency from the Droitwich Transmitting Station.
- 2 August – Clement Davies replaces Sir Archibald Sinclair as leader of the Liberal Party.
- 5 August – the Giles family cartoon first appears in the Sunday Express.
- 13 August – Zionist World Congress approaches the British government to talk about the establishment of the state of Israel.
- 14 August
  - The 1945 Prime Minister's Resignation Honours are announced, to mark the resignation of Winston Churchill.
  - Polish-Jewish orphans liberated from Theresienstadt concentration camp arrive in England for rehabilitation.
  - Late this evening, the new prime minister, Clement Attlee, and his foreign secretary, Ernest Bevin, broadcast news of the surrender of Japan to the nation and Empire, speaking from 10 Downing Street.
- 15 August – V-J Day is celebrated in the UK as the first of two days of national holiday, marking the end of World War II.
- 16 August – in the House of Commons, Leader of the Opposition Winston Churchill speaks of an "Iron Curtain" descending across Europe.
- 17 August – George Orwell's political allegory Animal Farm is published.
- 30 August – British sovereignty of Hong Kong restored following the end of the Japanese occupation of the territory.
- 1 September – clothes ration reduced.
- 2 September
  - Press censorship ends.
  - Lend-Lease from the United States terminates.
- September – J. B. Priestley's drama An Inspector Calls is premièred (in Russian translation) in Leningrad.
- 2 October – Piccadilly Circus tube station becomes the first to be lit by fluorescent light.
- 24 October – the British government signs the United Nations Charter.
- 7 November – RAF Group Captain Hugh J. Wilson sets a new official world airspeed record (the first for a jet aircraft) of 606 mph (975 km/h) in a Gloster Meteor, flying from RAF Manston.
- 14 November – Harold Macmillan begins his third term as a Conservative MP, after winning the by-election in Bromley, Kent.
- 15 November – Gainsborough Pictures releases the period melodrama The Wicked Lady starring Margaret Lockwood, Patricia Roc and James Mason.
- 26 November – J. Arthur Rank releases David Lean's film of Noël Coward's Brief Encounter starring Celia Johnson and Trevor Howard.
- 28 November – British fascist John Amery pleads guilty to treason and is immediately sentenced to hang.
- December
  - Alexander Fleming and Ernst Boris Chain win the Nobel Prize in Physiology or Medicine jointly with Howard Florey "for the discovery of penicillin and its curative effect in various infectious diseases".
  - John Maynard Keynes secures a fifty-year $3,750,000,000 Anglo-American loan for the Government from the United States at 2%, effective from 1946.
  - Bernard Lovell establishes the Jodrell Bank Observatory in Cheshire.
- 10 December – forced repatriation of Liverpool Chinese seamen begins.
- 31 December – Britain receives its first shipment of bananas since the beginning of the war.
- Undated – the grammar school at Windermere reorganises itself to become Britain's first comprehensive school.

== Publications ==
- Rev. W. V. Awdry's children's book The Three Railway Engines, first of The Railway Series (12 May).
- Agatha Christie's detective novel Sparkling Cyanide.
- E. B. Ford's book Butterflies, first of the New Naturalist series.
- Winston Graham's historical novel Ross Poldark, first of the Poldark series.
- Henry Green's novel Loving.
- C. S. Lewis' novel That Hideous Strength.
- Nancy Mitford's comic novel The Pursuit of Love, first of a trilogy.
- George Orwell's allegory Animal Farm (17 August).
- Karl Popper's book The Open Society and its Enemies.
- Bertrand Russell's A History of Western Philosophy.
- Evelyn Waugh's novel Brideshead Revisited.

== Births ==
- 3 January – David Starkey, English historian
- 6 January – Barry John, Welsh rugby union footballer (died 2024)
- 10 January
  - Jennifer Moss, actress (died 2006)
  - Rod Stewart, rock singer
- 15 January – Princess Michael of Kent, German-born wife of Prince Michael of Kent
- 18 January – Rocco Forte, hotelier
- 21 January – Martin Shaw, English actor
- 23 January – Richard Dearlove, English intelligence officer
- 25 January – Dave Walker, rock musician
- 26 January
  - Marti Caine, actress and musician (died 1995)
  - Jacqueline du Pré, English cellist (died 1987)
  - Ashley Hutchings, folk rock musician
- 29 January – Jim Nicholson, Northern Irish Unionist politician and MEP for Northern Ireland
- 30 January – Mike Kenny, paralympian swimmer
- 31 January – Brenda Hale, Baroness Hale of Richmond, President of the Supreme Court of the United Kingdom
- 3 February – Roy 'Chubby' Brown, born Royston Vasey, stand-up comedian
- 5 February – Charlotte Rampling, English actress
- 7 February – Gerald Davies, Welsh rugby player
- 13 February
  - Keith Nichols, jazz musician and manager (died 2021)
  - Simon Schama, historian
- 14 February – Martin Sorrell, businessman
- 15 February – John Helliwell, English saxophonist and keyboard player
- 16 February – Jeremy Bulloch, actor (died 2020)
- 20 February – Alan Hull, English folk rock singer-songwriter (died 1995)
- 25 February – Elkie Brooks, English singer
- 26 February – Michael Marmot, English epidemiologist
- 22 March – Peter Williams, English physicist and academic
- 30 March – Eric Clapton, English rock guitarist
- 2 April – Roger Bootle-Wilbraham, 7th Baron Skelmersdale, politician (died 2018)
- 6 April – Rodney Bickerstaffe, English trade union leader (died 2017)
- 7 April – Gerry Cottle, English circus owner (died 2021)
- 14 April – Ritchie Blackmore, English rock guitarist (Deep Purple)
- 19 April – Cleo Sylvestre, actress (died 2024)
- 20 April – Alistair Cooke, Baron Lexden, historian and author
- 21 April
  - Ian Bruce, charity leader and academic
  - Diana Darvey, actress, singer and dancer (died 2000)
- 27 April – Martin Chivers, English footballer (died 2026)
- 29 April – Hugh Hopper, English rock guitarist (died 2009)
- 6 May – Hilary Dwyer, actress, businessperson and film producer (died 2020)
- 9 May
  - Nina Campbell, interior designer
  - Peter J. Hammond, academic economist
  - Nicholas Wilson, Lord Wilson of Culworth, lawyer and judge
- 12 May
  - Alan Ball Jr., England footballer (died 2007)
  - Nicky Henson, actor (died 2019)
- 14 May – George Nicholls, English rugby league footballer
- 16 May – Nicky Chinn, English songwriter (The Sweet and Suzi Quatro)
- 19 May
  - Diana Maddock, Baroness Maddock, politician (died 2020)
  - Pete Townshend, English rock guitarist and singer-songwriter (The Who)
- 25 May – Dave Lee Travis, disc jockey and television presenter
- 29 May
  - Gary Brooker, English rock keyboardist and singer-songwriter (Procol Harum) (died 2022)
  - Martin Pipe, racehorse trainer
- 1 June – Ray Harford, footballer and manager (died 2003)
- 2 June – Lord David Dundas, musician and actor
- 3 June
  - Brian Barnes, golfer (died 2019)
  - John Derbyshire, English-American journalist and author
  - Roger Lane-Nott, admiral
  - Patricia Ruanne, ballerina (died 2022)
- 8 June
  - Len Badger, footballer (died 2021)
  - Anthony Bagnall, air chief marshal
  - Derek Underwood, cricketer (died 2024)
- 10 June – Benny Gallagher, Scottish singer-songwriter and multi-instrumentalist (Gallagher and Lyle)
- 12 June – Pat Jennings, Northern Irish football goalkeeper
- 14 June – Rod Argent, singer and keyboardist
- 15 June – Nicola Pagett, actress (died 2021)
- 17 June – Ken Livingstone, politician
- 19 June – John Hind, English bishop and theologian
- 24 June – Carol Klein, gardener and broadcaster
- 28 June
  - Ken Buchanan, Scottish lightweight boxer (died 2023)
  - David Knights, English rock guitarist (Procol Harum)
- 3 July – Iain MacDonald-Smith, English racing yachtsman
- 4 July – David McWilliams, Northern Irish singer-songwriter (died 2002)
- 7 July – Michael Ancram, Conservative politician and MP for Devizes
- 10 July
  - John Motson, football commentator (died 2023)
  - Virginia Wade, tennis player
- 16 July – Barry Dudleston, English first-class cricketer and umpire
- 19 July – Richard Henderson, Scottish molecular biologist, Nobel Prize laureate
- 20 July – John Lodge, English rock singer-songwriter (The Moody Blues)
- 21 July
  - Wendy Cope, English poet
  - John Lowe, English darts player
- 24 July – Martin Edwards, football executive
- 26 July
  - M. John Harrison, science fiction author
  - Suzanna Leigh, actress (died 2017)
  - Helen Mirren, actress
- 1 August – Laila Morse, English television actress
- 5 August – Martin Lambie-Nairn, production designer (died 2020)
- 6 August – Ron Jones, television director (died 1993)
- 8 August – Tom O'Carroll, paedophilia advocate
- 9 August – Posy Simmonds, English cartoonist and illustrator
- 13 August
  - Robin Jackman, cricketer (died 2020)
  - Howard Marks ("Mr Nice"), Welsh cannabis smuggler, writer and campaigner (died 2016)
- 14 August – Jennifer d'Abo, entrepreneur (died 2003)
- 19 August – Ian Gillan, English hard rock singer (Deep Purple)
- 24 August – Ken Hensley, singer-songwriter (Uriah Heep) (died 2020)
- 31 August – Van Morrison, Northern Irish singer-songwriter
- 4 September – Bill Kenwright, English theatre producer (died 2023)
- 8 September – Kelly Groucutt, English rock guitarist (Electric Light Orchestra) (died 2009)
- 14 September – Martin Tyler, sports broadcaster
- 18 September – John McAfee, British-American computer programmer and businessman (died 2021)
- 19 September – Kate Adie, journalist
- 21 September – Shaw Clifton, General of The Salvation Army
- 24 September
  - John Rutter, choral composer
  - Ian Stewart, mathematician and popular science writer
- 26 September – Bryan Ferry, pop rock singer and musician
- 27 September – Bob Spiers, television director (died 2008)
- 5 October
  - Brian Connolly, Scottish musician (died 1997)
  - Geoff Leigh, English saxophonist and flute player
- 14 October – Gareth Forwood, actor (died 2007)
- 15 October – Dave Hill, actor
- 17 October – Jimmy Cricket, Northern Irish comedian (died 2026)
- 19 October – Angus Deaton, Scottish-born economist, Nobel Prize laureate
- 23 October
  - Hugh Fraser, actor
  - Maggi Hambling, painter and sculptor
- 31 October – Al Jones, folk singer (died 2008)
- 10 November – Terence Davies, English film director and screenwriter (died 2023)
- 14 November – Louise Ellman, academic and politician
- 17 November – Gordon Phillips, English football player and manager (died 2018)
- 25 November – Bobby Knutt, English actor and comedian (died 2017)
- 26 November – John McVie, English rock bass guitarist (Fleetwood Mac)
- 30 November
  - Hilary Armstrong, politician
  - Mary Millington, pornographic film actress (suicide 1979)
- 7 December – Clive Russell, English actor
- 16 December – Tony Hicks, guitarist and singer (The Hollies)
- 17 December
  - David Mallet, director
  - Jacqueline Wilson, English children's writer
- 19 December – Ron Hunt, English footballer (died 2018)
- 24 December – Ian "Lemmy" Kilminster, bassist and singer (Motörhead) (died 2015)
- 25 December
  - Eve Pollard, newspaper editor
  - Noel Redding, rock musician (died 2003)
- 28 December – Max Hastings, journalist and military historian
- 30 December – Davy Jones, English-born pop singer and actor (died 2012)

== Deaths ==
- 2 January – Sir Bertram Ramsay, admiral; killed on active service (born 1883)
- 6 January – Herbert Lumsden, general; killed in action (born 1897)
- 9 January – Dennis O'Neill, Welsh child manslaughter victim (born 1932)
- 30 January – William Goodenough, admiral (born 1867)
- 21 January – Archibald Murray, general (born 1860)
- 31 January – Les Adams, rugby league player; killed in action (born 1909)
- 21 February – Eric Liddell, athlete and missionary; died in Weixian Internment Camp (born 1902)
- 5 March – Albert Richards, war artist; killed on active service (born 1919)
- 7 March – Daniel Everett, RAF pilot; killed in action (born 1920)
- 8 March – Frederick Bligh Bond, architect, archaeologist and psychical researcher (born 1864)
- 20 March – Lord Alfred Douglas, poet and former lover of Oscar Wilde (born 1870)
- 23 March – Sir Napier Shaw, meteorologist (born 1854)
- 26 March – David Lloyd George, former prime minister (born 1863)
- 29 March – Jack Agazarian, spy; executed (born 1916)
- 7 April – Elizabeth Bibesco, writer and socialite; pneumonia (born 1897)
- 11 April – Cecil Griffiths, athlete, winner of gold medal in 4 × 400 m relay at the 1920 Summer Olympics; heart failure (born 1901)
- 18 April – Sir John Ambrose Fleming, electrical engineer and physicist (born 1849)
- 3 May – Herbert Farjeon, man of the theatre (born 1887)
- 15 May
  - Kenneth J. Alford (Frederick J. Ricketts), composer of military marches (born 1881)
  - Charles Williams, author (born 1886)
- 27 July – Alfred Dobbs, politician; automobile accident (born 1882)
- 6 September – Maximilian von Herff, Waffen-SS officer and Knight's Cross recipient; stroke (born 1893 in Germany)
- 18 September – C. H. Middleton, gardening broadcaster (born 1886)
- 22 September – Thomas Burke, fiction writer (born 1886)
- 31 October
  - Henry Ainley, actor (born 1879)
  - Alfred Edward Taylor, philosopher (born 1869)
- 20 November – Francis William Aston, chemist, Nobel Prize laureate (born 1877)
- 4 December – Arthur Morrison, writer (born 1863)
- 5 December – Cosmo Gordon Lang, former archbishop of Canterbury (born 1864)
- 14 December – Princess Maud, Countess of Southesk, granddaughter of Edward VII; bronchitis (born 1893)
- 26 December
  - Roger Keyes, 1st Baron Keyes, admiral (born 1872)
  - Charlie Trigg, jockey (born 1881)

== See also ==
- List of British films of 1945
- Military history of the United Kingdom during World War II
