= 15th Ariel Awards =

1973 Mexican film awards

- Date: May 20, 1973

Highlights
- Best Picture: El Castillo de la Pureza, Mecánica Nacional, and Reed, México Insurgente
- Most awards: El Castillo de la Pureza and Mecánica Nacional (5)
- Most nominations: El Castillo de la Pureza and Mecánica Nacional (10)

The 15th Ariel Awards ceremony, organized by the Mexican Academy of Film Arts and Sciences (AMACC) took place on May 20, 1973, in Mexico City. During the ceremony, AMACC presented the Ariel Award in 14 categories honoring films released in 1972. El Castillo de la Pureza and Mecánica Nacional were the most nominated films, and also the most awarded with five wins each, including a tie for Best Picture, with Reed, México Insurgente. Canadian-Mexican cinematographer Alex Phillips received the Golden Ariel for his artistic career.

== Winners and nominees ==
Winners are listed first and highlighted with boldface.

**Best Picture**: **El Castillo de la Pureza**; **Mecánica Nacional**; **Reed, México Insurgente**	**Best Director**: **Luis Alcoriza** – **Mecánica Nacional**; Paul Leduc – Reed, México Insurgente; Arturo Ripstein – El Castillo de la Pureza
**Best Actor**: **Ignacio López Tarso** – **Rosa Blanca** **as Jacinto Yáñez**; Alfonso Arau – El Rincón de las Vírgenes as Lucas Lucatero; Jorge Martínez de Hoyos – Los Días del Amor as Vicente Icaza	**Best Actress**: **Lucha Villa** – **Mecánica Nacional** **as Chabela**; Helena Rojo – Los Cachorros as Tere; Maritza Olivares – Los Meses y Los Días as Cecilia
**Best Supporting Actor**: **Arturo Beristáin** – **El Castillo de la Pureza** **as Porvenir**; Héctor Ortega – El Rincón de las Vírgenes as Gobernador; Héctor Suárez – Mecánica Nacional as Gregorio	**Best Supporting Actress**: **Diana Bracho** – **El Castillo de la Pureza** **as Utopía**; Anita Blanch – Los Días del Amor as Grandecita; Gloria Marín – Mecánica Nacional as Dora
**Best Screenplay**: **El Castillo de la Pureza – Arturo Ripstein and José Emilio Pacheco**; Los Días del Amor – Alberto Isaac and Emilio García Riera; Mecánica Nacional – Luis Alcoriza	**Best Original Story**: **Mecánica Nacional** – **Luis Alcoriza**; El Castillo de la Pureza – Arturo Ripstein and José Emilio Pacheco; Los Días del Amor – Alberto Isaac
**Best Original Score**: **Los Días del Amor – José Antonio Alcaraz, Lucía Álvarez and Raúl Lavista**; El Muro del Silencio – Rubén Fuentes; Los Cachorros – Eduardo Luján and Joaquín Gutiérrez Heras	**Best Cinematography**: **María – Gabriel Figueroa**; El Castillo de la Pureza – Alex Phillips; Reed, México Insurgente – Alex Grivas
**Best Film Editing**: **Mecánica Nacional – Carlos Savage**; El Castillo de la Pureza – Eufemio Rivera; Reed, México Insurgente – Giovanni Korporaal and Rafael Castanedo	**Best Art Direction**: **El Castillo de la Pureza – Manuel Fontanals**; Mecánica Nacional – Manuel Fontanals; Rosa Blanca – Edward Fitzgerald
**Best Set Decoration**: **Los Días del Amor – Lucero Isaac**; El Castillo de la Pureza – Lucero Isaac; Vals Sin Fin – Julio Alejandro	**Best Documentary Short Subject**: **Frida Kahlo – Marcela Fernández Violante**
