= Rififi in Amsterdam =

Rififi in Amsterdam may refer to:

- Rififi in Amsterdam (1962 film)
- Rififi in Amsterdam (1966 film)
