= The Castle of Purity =

1972 film by Arturo Ripstein

- Film poster
- Directed by: Arturo Ripstein
- Written by: Arturo Ripstein; José Emilio Pacheco
- Produced by: Angélica Ortiz
- Starring: Claudio Brook; Rita Macedo; Diana Bracho; Arturo Beristáin; Gladys Bermejo; David Silva; María Rojo
- Cinematography: Alex Phillips
- Music by: Joaquín Gutiérrez Heras
- Release date: 1972
- Running time: 110 minutes
- Country: Mexico
- Language: Spanish

The Castle of Purity (Spanish: El castillo de la pureza) is a 1972 Mexican drama film directed by Arturo Ripstein. It is based on a real criminal case that took place in Mexico City in 1959.

== Plot ==
Gabriel Lima, a chemist who manufactures rat poison, is convinced that the outside world is harmful to his family. Therefore, he keeps his wife Beatriz and their three children locked up in a large house. The fragile situation changes when he realizes that his children, Porvenir, Utopía, and Voluntad, are entering adolescence.

== Cast ==
- Claudio Brook – Gabriel Lima
- Rita Macedo – Beatriz
- Arturo Beristáin – Porvenir
- Diana Bracho – Utopía
- Gladys Bermejo – Voluntad
- Mario Castillón Bracho – Undercover cop

== Development ==
According to the director, the film was based on a case that appeared in newspapers in the 1950s, of a man who isolated his family and did not allow them to leave. "There was a lot of talk about the case when I was a little boy." Two works come from the case; a novel by Luis Spota called, "La Carcajadas del Gato", and a play by Sergio Magaña called, "Los Motivos del Lobo".

Ripstein had a friend who knew Galindo and so he was asked to play a role on stage. "I decided not to do that because I was not an actor... but I read the play... I really liked it."

Actress Dolores del Río was interested in the rights to the play and contacted Luis Buñuel, who declined, but recommended his protege Ripstein. "Dolores del Río called and said, 'I would like to make an adaptation of the play', and I said, 'I would prefer to go directly to the source and take the case from the newspapers.'"

Ripstein then enlisted José Emilio Pacheco, to help with the research and writing of the screenplay. "When Pacheco and I finished the script, we were absolutely convinced that it was a comedy. We laughed a lot while writing it."

As the script neared completion, del Río told Ripstein, "'I don't want it (the father's role) to be Fernando Rey, I want it to be Ignacio López Tarso,' and I said, 'No, look, Ignacio López Tarso doesn't work for me because he is a very nagging man, and he has a very grim face, and what I want is for him to be the exact opposite of that; for there to be a balance between the stony madness of this man— and a more or less gentle face.'"

Producers Manuel Barbachano Ponce and Don Gabriel Figueroa backed del Río's choice of casting, but were crushed when production manager Felipe Subervielle told them the script had never been paid for. So, instead of the famous producers firing him, the 27 year-old director turned the tables and told them, "Gentlemen, this is my script and at this moment what I am going to say to you, Don Gabriel Figueroa, and to you, Doña Dolores, is that you are fired."

As Ripstein left the Churubusco Studio lot, with his script and dignity but no backing, he ran into producer Angélica Ortiz. She said, "Look, it's Friday, leave me the weekend, I'll call you next week. Let me read it and let's see what can be done." Ortiz called the very next day and suggested they go see Rodolfo Echeverría, and there it was financed.

== Production ==
The Castle of Purity was the final film for two legendary veterans of the crew. Set designer Manuel Fontanals had worked with names like, Gabriele D'Annunzio (illustrating the first edition of 'Dreams of the Seasons'), Miguel M. Delgado, Roberto Gavaldón, Gilberto Martínez Solares, and the stage plays of García Lorca. Ripstein said, "It was a great pleasure... the set he built was really beautiful. Fontanals had to do a lot of crap movies in his career... when he arrived and gave me the set he said, "Here it is, you can use it now. I really appreciate you allowing me to retire with dignity." That, for me, was very, very exciting." The home in the film reproduced the old houses in the center of Mexico City, in meticulous detail on a set at Churubusco studios. After the film was completed, Fontonals gave the only known interview of his life, published in This magazine (September 10, 1972). He died one week later.

Ripstein made several films that were the final works of three time Ariel Award winner, cinematographer Alex Phillips, with The Castle of Purity being the last. "It was enormously pleasant. He filmed hundreds of movies...was Gregg Toland's roommate, and was famously the cameraman Mary Pickford insisted shoot her close ups."

"Alex Philips shot almost the whole movie, but suddenly he got sick. Some days he couldn't go anymore, then he was replaced by his son, with whom I worked a few times too. The shooting was [...] it was formidable; it's one of those movies where I still don't know too much about how it was done. Rather than directing, I learned."

== Awards ==
=== Ariel Awards ===
The Ariel Awards are awarded annually by the Mexican Academy of Film Arts and Sciences in Mexico. El Castillo de la Pureza received five awards out of 10 nominations.

Year	Nominee / work	Award	Result
1973	El Castillo de la Pureza (tied with Mecánica Nacional and Reed, México Insurgente)	Best Picture	Won
1973	Arturo Ripstein	Best Direction	Nominated
1973	Arturo Beristáin	Best Supporting Actor	Won
1973	Diana Bracho	Best Supporting Actress	Won
1973	Arturo Ripstein, José Emilio Pacheco	Best Original Screenplay	Won
1973	Arturo Ripstein, José Emilio Pacheco	Best Original Story	Nominated
1973	Alex Phillips	Best Cinematography	Nominated
1973	Eufemio Rivera	Best Editing	Nominated
1973	Manuel Fontanals	Best Scenography	Won
1973	Lucero Isaac	Best Set Decoration	Nominated

== See also ==
- Dogtooth, a 2009 film with a similar plot
