= Aurora Clavel =

Mexican actress (1936–2025)

Aurora Clavel Gallardo
- Born: August 14, 1934; Pinotepa Nacional, Oaxaca, Mexico
- Died: May 19, 2025 (aged 90); Mexico City, Mexico
- Occupation: Actress Poet Activist
- Years active: 1961–2017
- Spouse: Simon Armengod

Aurora Clavel (October 29, 1934 – May 19, 2025) was a Mexican actress. She was noted for her roles in the films Tarahumara (1965) and Once Upon a Scoundrel (1973), as well as in numerous telenovelas, such as Mama Lupe in Mariana de la Noche.

Clavel died in Mexico City on May 19, 2025, at the age of 90.

== Selected filmography ==
- Carnaval en mi barrio (1961) – Bailarina indígena (uncredited)
- La rosa blanca (1961) – Pueblerina
- El tejedor de milagros (1962) – Jacinta
- Tiburoneros (1963) – Esposa de Rubén
- Las dos galleras (1964)
- Los amores de Marieta Los Fabulosos 20s (1964)
- El mundo de las drogas (1964) – Campesina quemada
- Major Dundee (1965) – Melinche
- Tarahumara (1965) – Belén
- La soldadera (1966) – Victoria
- ¡Viva Benito Canales! (1966) – Chelito
- Rage (1966)
- Rancho solo (1967)
- Guns for San Sebastian (1968)
- El bastardo (1968)
- Le Rapace (1968) – Aurora
- Dr. Satán y la magia negra (1968)
- The Wild Bunch (1969) – Aurora
- La maestra inolvidable (1969)
- La constitución (1970, TV series) – Indígena yaqui
- Los juniors (1970) – Tina
- Soldier Blue (1970) – Indian Woman
- The Bridge in the Jungle (1971) – Aurelia
- Lucía Sombra (1971, TV Series) – Señora de Ravel
- Bang bang al hoyo (1971)
- El carruaje (1972, TV series) – Woman
- Chanoc contra el tigre y el vampiro (1972) – Flor de loto
- Mi niño Tizoc (1972) – Maestra
- The Wrath of God (1972) – Señora Moreno
- National Mechanics (1972) – Mujer del sábanas
- Los cachorros (1973)
- Pat Garrett and Billy the Kid (1973) – Ida Garrett
- El principio (1973) – Madre soldadera
- Once Upon a Scoundrel (1974)
- Auandar Anapu (el que cayó del cielo) (1975) – Lamadre
- The House in the South (1975) – Jacinta
- Do You Hear the Dogs Barking? (1975) – Madre de José
- Chicano (1976)
- Somos del otro Laredo (Chicanos Go Home) (1977) – La mestiza (Chonita)
- Mariachi - Fiesta de sangre (1977) – Magdalena Vargas
- Deseos (1977)
- Los amantes frios (1978) – Evodia (segment "El Soplador del vidrio")
- Yara (1979, TV Series)
- Los ricos también lloran (1979, TV Series) – Chole Lopez (1979)
- Fuego negro (1979) – Nanny
- Oficio de tinieblas (1981) – Nana Teresa
- Mi nombre es Sergio, soy alcohólico (1981) – Judith
- Vanessa (1982, TV Series) – Marga
- En el país de los pies ligeros (1982)
- Mundo mágico (1983)
- Hombres de tierra caliente (1983)
- El asesino (1983)
- Vivir un poco (1985, TV Series) – Andrea's secretary
- The Mosquito Coast (1986) – Mrs. Maywit
- Los lavaderos II (1987)
- Rosa salvaje (1988, TV Series) – Madre de Ernesto
- El pecado de Oyuki (1988, TV Series) – Nanae
- ¿Pedro infante vive? (1991) – Mujer con Infante
- Milagro de Vietnam (1992)
- Mariachi (1993)
- Vagabunda (1994) – Aniceta
- El hombre de blanco (1994) – María
- La víbora (1995)
- Sucedió en Garibaldi (1995) – Rocío
- Te sigo amando (1996, TV Series) – Tránsito
- María Isabel (1997, TV Series) – Amargura
- Abrázame muy fuerte (2000, TV Series) – Vicenta
- Atrévete a olvidarme (2001, TV Series) – Eduarda
- Mariana de la Noche (2003, TV Series) – Mamá Lupe
- Contra viento y marea (2005, TV Series) – Ocumé
- Alborada (2005, TV Series) – Cleotilde
- Pasión (2007, TV Series) – La nana de Claudio y Ángel
- Fuego en la sangre (2008, TV Series) – Ofelia
- Espiral (2008) – Luvina
- Cuidado con el ángel (2008, TV Series) – Fermina
- Soy tu dueña (2010, TV Series) – Doña Angustias
- Rafaela (2011, TV Series) – Refugio
- Como dice el dicho (2012–2014, TV Series) – Viviana / Lucinda
- Las paredes hablan (2012) – Doña Luz
- Mentir para vivir (2013, TV Series) – Eduviges
- Corazón indomable (2013, TV Series) – Serafina
- Yo no creo en los hombres (2014-2015, TV Series) – Chelo
- Un Camino Hacia el Destino (2016) – Rosário
- La habitación (2016) – Genoveva
- La candidata (2017, TV Series)
