= Castle of Purity (criminal case) =

Child abuse case in Mexico City

- Date: c. 1941–1959
- Location: Mexico City, Mexico
- Type: Child abuse, false imprisonment, slavery
- Perpetrator: Rafael Pérez Hernández

"Castle of Purity" (Spanish: El Castillo de la Pureza) was a child abuse and slavery case that occurred in Mexico City in the late 1950s. It was perpetrated by Rafael Pérez Hernández, a rat poison manufacturer who locked up his family for 18 years inside an old, dilapidated home in Mexico City's northwestern outskirts.

== Background ==
Pérez (1905–1972) was born in Jalisco. During his early life, he performed odd jobs. Working on the railroads, he lost an arm in 1915. He married Sonia María Rosa Noé, a woman of Spanish descent, in 1938. The couple settled in Mexico City, in an old house located at the intersection of Insurgentes Avenue and Godard street. The marriage was stable during the first seven years, after which the family lock up began. The location was known as La casa de los macetones (the big planters house) by locals, since it sported large planters at its facade. Pérez was known as a reclusive, but otherwise quiet man who left his house only to distribute the rat poison he manufactured at his home.

The couple had six children named after ideals and personality traits: Indómita (Untamed), Libre (Free), Soberano (Sovereign), Triunfador (Winner), Bien Vivir (Well Living), and Libre Pensamiento (Free Thought).

== Crime ==
Pérez kept his family isolated from the outside world from around 1941 to 1959. He attached wood planks to the windows so they could not see the street or interact with anyone. According to testimonies, the family, especially the children, were forced to work long hours to manufacture rat poison under poor working conditions. Despite the mother's pleas, their children were not allowed to attend school. Contradictory statements were made regarding the issue, some claiming that Pérez trained his wife to homeschool their kids, or that she taught them to read and write.

The children were not allowed to leave their home, since Pérez thought that the outside world was evil and corrupted, and he was raising pure, innocent, and good people with his approach.

== Arrest ==
On July 25, 1959, the police came to the house after a passerby picked up a piece of a paper bag outside the house. The paper held a note begging for rescue, and was supposedly Indómita's third attempt to call for someone's attention.

The crime became a media sensation, and Pérez was taken to Palacio de Lecumberri prison. He denied all charges, insisting he was a good father and that his family was trying to get rid of him to get all his money and possessions. The children were found malnourished, dressed in antiquated clothes and rags, and the house was dirty and dilapidated. The family was confused and startled by the outside world, they were barely literate and had almost no knowledge of outside events.

== Aftermath ==
Some neighbors stated that Pérez Hernández indeed took his children outside and they looked like a normal family. Newspapers and other media depicted Pérez as a deranged man that had peepholes throughout the house to spy on everyone or that they were subjected to inquisition-like punishments when they disobeyed him.

Despite the magnitude of the crime, the family received very little help from the government or institutions; they continued barely surviving and struggled to adapt to the outside world. They kept visiting Pérez in prison and forgave him. Pérez kept insisting he was innocent, and a good and well-adjusted father. He died by suicide in 1972 in his cell.

== Culture ==
The case had such influence on Mexico's culture that it has been adapted to different media through the years:

- Arturo Ripstein directed El Castillo de la Pureza in 1972; a film starred by Claudio Brook and Diana Bracho.
- Luis Spota wrote La Carcajada del Gato (The Cat's Cackle) in 1964, a novel loosely based on the case, depicting Rafael Pérez as a deranged polymath who tries to build a utopia inside the concentric walls of his maze-like house.

== See also ==
- List of long-term false imprisonment cases
- List of solved missing person cases (pre-1950)
