= Battles in the Desert =

1980 novella written by José Emilio Pacheco

- Spanish cover
- Author: José Emilio Pacheco
- Original title: Las batallas en el desierto
- Language: Spanish
- Publisher: Ediciones Era
- Publication date: 1981
- Publication place: Mexico City
- Media type: Print (paperback)
- Pages: 72
- ISBN: 978-607-445-055-2

Battles in the Desert (Spanish: Las batallas en el desierto) is a novella written by Mexican author José Emilio Pacheco. The novella was first published in the Saturday edition of the Mexico City daily Unomásuno on 7 June 1980, and was later published by Ediciones Era the following year. The story is narrated by Carlos, as an adult, recounting his memories as a boy growing up in Mexico City in the late 1940s and 1950s. In particular, his experiences and the events that unfolded after falling in love with the mother of one of his classmates comprise the central narrative of the novella.

== Plot summary ==
Battles in the Desert is written from the perspective of a middle-aged Carlos, who is Mexican and grew up in the Colonia Roma of the Distrito Federal (now Mexico City), reminiscing about his life in post-World War II Mexico. It begins with Carlos recounting the political and social atmosphere of Mexico during the time period of his childhood, beginning with the evocative yet paradoxical line "I remember, I don't remember." He describes the national feeling of optimism towards the administration of new president Miguel Alemán, and the slow modernization and incorporation of Mexico. Initially, Carlos's speech evokes his primary school and the games the children played. The children would bully the Japanese student Toru and the two indigenous children Peralta and Rosales.

One of Carlos's classmates was Jim who was born in San Francisco and spoke two languages without an accent. Jim's father was a married influential businessman who held an important position in the Mexican government; but Jim lived with his single mother, Mariana, in an apartment near the school. Aware of the affair, the children talked behind Jim's back, saying his mother was simply a mistress.

After Carlos defends Jim in a fight with Rosales, Jim invites Carlos over to his house for a snack after school. Jim's mother makes the two boys a snack, and Carlos is overwhelmed by her beauty and youth. He vows to keep the memory of meeting her intact for the rest of his life.

Carlos, convinced he was in love with Mariana, began to visit Jim's house as often as he could, hiding his emotions from Jim. One day, however, his emotions overcome him and he rushes out of school to see her. At Mariana's apartment, he confesses his love for her and Mariana gently reminds him of the impossibility of the situation but still gave him a kiss on the cheek. When Carlos returned to school, Jim caught on to the situation and told their teacher what happened. Despite Mariana claiming Carlos only came over to get his history textbook, the principal called Carlos's parents and told them everything.

Carlos's parents began to believe that Carlos was mentally unstable, and took him to confess at a church, and then to a psychiatrist. One woman claimed he was mentally deficient and had an Oedipal problem, the psychiatrist argued that he was abnormally smart, so smart that by the age of 15 he would become a "total idiot", and that his behavior was due to lack of affection. Carlos was angered that they couldn't come to a consensus before diagnosing him.

As time went on Carlos's brother Héctor – an outspoken right-wing political activist – got into similar trouble, he was caught sexually abusing maids, beating up their sister's boyfriend, and doing drugs, but Carlos remained the “black sheep” of the family.

After some time and a change in schools, Carlos encounters Rosales on a bus. After chasing him down, Rosales agrees to speak with him over lunch. He reveals that Mariana had allegedly killed herself after the events of the past year, and that Jim no longer attended their school. Carlos, refusing to accept what Rosales said as fact, rushed down to Mariana's apartment to try and talk to her. The doorman claimed to have no recollection of Mariana or Jim, and when Carlos went to ask the owner, he told him to mind his own business.

The story ends with Carlos reflecting on the fragile nature of history, and how even though he was sure everything happened, it was all gone.

== Background and publication ==
The novella Battles in the Desert was written in 1981 by José Emilio Pacheco. The novella was dedicated to Eduardo Mejía and written in memory of Juan Marvel Torres. Accompanying Battles in the Desert are other short stories that such as "The Pleasure Principle", "You Wouldn't Understand", "The Sunken Park", "The Captive", "August Afternoon", and "Acheron".

Battles in the Desert and his other stories have been translated into many languages such as English, Japanese, German, Russian, and French. While Pacheco originally wrote the novella in Spanish, it was enjoyed in these languages and helped spark new works of arts in other fields. The novella inspired other mediums such as comics, plays, films such as Mariana, Mariana (1987), and songs by groups such as Café Tacvba. For his poetry and literature, Pacheco was awarded the Miguel de Cervantes Prize by Spain's Culture Ministry in 2009.
