= Cristina Pacheco =

Mexican journalist, writer and television personality (1941–2023)

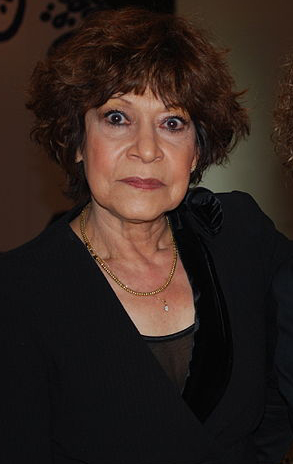
- Pacheco in 2012
- Born: Cristina Romo Hernández; 13 September 1941; San Felipe, Guanajuato, Mexico
- Died: 21 December 2023 (aged 82); Mexico City, Mexico
- Education: National Autonomous University of Mexico
- Occupations: Journalist; writer; television personality
- Years active: 1960–2023
- Spouse: José Emilio Pacheco (m. 1965; died 2014)
- Children: 2

Cristina Romo Hernández (13 September 1941 – 21 December 2023), better known as Cristina Pacheco, was a Mexican journalist, writer and television personality. While her journalism career began in 1960, continuing with regular columns in La Jornada, she was best known for her work in television, hosting two shows called Aquí nos tocó vivir and Conversando con Cristina Pacheco, both on Once TV since 1980. With these shows, Pacheco interviewed notable people and profiled popular Mexican culture, which included interviews with common people. She received over forty prizes and other recognitions for her work including Mexico's National Journalism Prize and the first Rosario Castellanos a la Trayectoria Cultural de la Mujer Award for outstanding women in the Spanish-speaking world.

== Early life ==
Cristina Pacheco was born Cristina Romo Hernández on 13 September 1941 in San Felipe, Guanajuato. She was youngest one of six children of a family poor enough to know what hunger was. However, her parents taught her not to beg from others nor to cry. The family left Guanajuato to live in San Luis Potosí but only briefly, because there Pacheco hurt herself gravely and the family moved to Mexico City for her medical treatment. Her mother decided that the family should stay in the city as she had family there. Her family all lived in one room with no privacy. Although she did not have money or toys, she did have freedom, as it was easy for her to escape as her mother was always busy. She would stay by the doors of houses and eavesdrop on neighbors. She said she saw and heard many things as no one took notice of her. For this reason she called herself an "insignificant child", not because she thought she was insignificant but because others saw her as such. What she saw was the good and bad in life. This inspired in her the desire to be a writer and journalist, from which she never wavered.

Pacheco attended the National Autonomous University of Mexico, where she received a bachelor's in Spanish. Until his death in 2014, she was married to writer, poet and translator José Emilio Pacheco, from whom she took her professional name and with whom she had two daughters. She did not like to talk about the details of her relationship with her husband, stating only that it was an ordinary marriage although she admired her husband's work greatly. Despite her successful career in radio and television, she did not encourage her daughters to follow this path because she did not believe these media inform the public as they should. She did not like being famous. She did much of her own housework because she said it "keeps her feet on the ground" and she could not work unless there was a certain amount of order. She was invited to run for political office but declined.

== Career as a journalist and writer ==
Her career began in writing and she was an editor, journalist and writer of various genres. She was best known for her work chronicling the popular culture of Mexico, later doing this on radio and television. She considered herself first a journalist and writer, which to her was adventure, imagination and improvisation. When she was younger and single she wanted to cover war stories and the like, but later she was quite satisfied with the work that she did.

Pacheco began her journalism career in 1960 with the El Popular and Novedades newspapers. In 1963 she began writing for Sucesos magazine under the pseudonym of Juan Ángel Real. In 1977 she joined the staff of Siempre! magazine. She also published interviews and other articles for other publications such as El Sol de México (1976–1977), the Cuadrante de la Soledad section of El Día (1977–1985), and La Jornada from 1986 onwards. For the last, her best known work was a weekly column series entitled Mar de Historias. She edited the Contenido book series, the Revista de la Universidad de México and Sábado, a supplement of the daily Unomásuno.

In addition to newspaper columns and reports, she also wrote short stories, chronicles, novels, essays and children's literature. She published fifteen novels including Para vivir aquí (1983), Sopita de fideo (1984), Cuarto de azotea (1986), Zona de desastre (1986), La última noche del tigre (1987), El corazón de la noche (1989), Para mirar a lo lejos (1989), Amores y desamores (1996), Los trabajos perdidos (1998), and El oro del desierto (2005). Books which feature collections of her interviews include Testimonio y conversaciones (1984), La luz de México (1988), Los dueños de la noche (1990), Al pie de la letra (2001), Limpios de todo amor, cuentos reunidos, 1997–2001 (2001) (a collection of her works from Mar de historias) and La rueda de la fortuna (1993). Her interview collections often have a narrative feel. Children's books include La chistera maravillosa (2004), El eucalipto Ponciano (2006), La canción del grillo (2006), Se vende burro (2006), Dos amigos (2008), El pájaro de madera (2008) and Humo en tus ojos (2010).

== Career on radio and television ==
Despite her long journalism career, it was her work on television that made her famous. She began as a commentator on the show Séptimo Días on Channel 13 on which she realized a series of interviews with writer Renato Leduc. After 1977 she worked with Once TV starting as commentator on the shows Así fue la semana and De todos modos Juan te llamas, a series of interviews with writer Juan de la Cabada. In 1980, she began hosting two shows of her own on Once: Aquí nos tocó vivir and Conversando con Cristina Pacheco. Both covered cultural topics related to Mexico.

With the show Conversando, con Cristina Pacheco, she profiled people in the arts and popular culture such as writers, musicians, artists, artisans, sports figures, which included Portuguese writer José Saramago, Catalan lyricist Joan Manuel Serrat, painters Juan Soriano and Perro Aguayo . With Aquí nos tocó vivir, the emphasis was on everyday Mexico, including interviews with people who were not famous but whose stories intrigued Pacheco.

Pacheco researched her subjects prior to interview but she did not prepare a list of questions because she felt this was demeaning. She did not like to be interviewed herself, but it allowed her to understand those she interviewed. She was not confrontational with her interviews as not only is this not well viewed in Mexico, she also believed that there were limits to what an interviewer should ask. The interviews lasted from between two and three hours before they were edited down. She said every person has his/her unique story; even interviewing the same person twice will yield different results. For this reason, she said that she was still nervous before each interview she did, worried that she might not get all of the most important information. She said all of her interviewees impressed her, with no one person standing out.

Pacheco also did radio work, appearing on XEQ-AM radio with programs such as Voz pública and Los dueños de la noche, on XEW-AM with the program Aquí y ahora, and Radio Fórmula with the programs Los amos de la noche and Periodismo y algo más.

Pacheco died on 21 December 2023, 20 days after announcing her retirement from Aquí nos tocó vivir for health reasons. She was 82. Her daughter, Laura Emilia Pacheco, revealed the next day that she died of cancer, detected less than a month prior to her death.

== Recognition ==
Pacheco received over forty awards and other recognitions over her career. These include the National Journalism Prize of Mexico in 1985, the National Association of Journalist Prize in 1986, the Teponaxtli Prize from Malinalco in 1986 and the Medalla al Mérito Ciudadano. In 2001, she was honored by Once TV with a commemorative plaque at the company. In 2006 she was honored with an episode of a program called El ciclo Celebrando a … from CONACULTA at the Centro Cultural Tijuana. In 2011 she received a national homage at the Palacio de Bellas Artes. In 2012, she received several important awards, such as the Juan Crisóstomo Doria Prize from the Universidad Autónoma del Estado de Hidalgo, recognition at the Feria Internacional del Libro in Guadalajara and the first Rosario Castellanos a la Trayectoria Cultural de la Mujer Award at the Palacio de Bellas Artes. This award was created to recognize women in the Spanish-speaking world who stand out in their fields and promote culture.
