= National Mechanics =

- Directed by: Luis Alcoriza
- Written by: Luis Alcoriza
- Produced by: Ramiro Meléndez
- Starring: Manolo Fábregas; Lucha Villa; Héctor Suárez; Sara García
- Cinematography: Álex Phillips Jr.
- Edited by: Juan José Marino; Carlos Savage
- Music by: Rubén Fuentes
- Production company: Producciones Escorpión
- Release date: December 28, 1972 (Mexico)
- Running time: 105 minutes
- Country: Mexico
- Language: Spanish

National Mechanics (Spanish:Mecánica nacional) is a 1972 Mexican comedy film directed and written by Luis Alcoriza, and starring Manolo Fábregas, Lucha Villa, Héctor Suárez and Sara García. It filmed in May 1971 with locations near the free highway to Cuernavaca, and It was released in Mexico City on December 28, 1972.

== Synopsis and TV sequel ==
An owner of a mechanic's shop who is a car racing enthusiast (Manolo Fábregas) goes to attend one of the races in the company of his family and friends. Among the excesses, the commotion and chaotic partying, he is cheated on by his wife (Lucha Villa), his daughter (Alma Muriel) has sex with the groom, and his mother, the grandmother of the family (Sara García), dies from stomach congestion.

A sequel was made in 1972 as a television series starring David Reynoso and Lucha Villa, and it ran for only a few episodes. It was titled Telemecánica nacional (National Telemechanics in English). The cast was completed by Nubia Martí and Jorge Ortiz de Pinedo. In the first chapter, the family came with the corpse of the grandmother. Since they had taken her sitting in the car, she was in a stiff position unable to straighten her up, so they did all manner of things to fit her body in the coffin.

== Partial cast ==
- Manolo Fábregas as Eufemio
- Lucha Villa as Isabel
- Héctor Suárez as Gregorio
- Sara García as Doña Lolita
- Alma Muriel as Rosarito
- Pancho Córdova as Güero Corrales
- Aurora Clavel as Sábanas wife
- Alejandro Ciangherotti as Lalo
- Fabián Aranza as El Apache
- Fernando Casanova as Rogelio
- Pilar Bayona as Blond Girl in White
- Carlos Piñar as Blond guy in white
- Gloria Marín as Dora
- Maritza Olivares as Paulina
- Fabiola Falcón as Laila
- Eduardo López Rojas as Don Chava
- Federico Curiel as Nando
- Sergio Calderón as El Manchas
- Alejandra Mora as Secretary
- Elsa Cardiel as Secretary
- Luis Manuel Pelayo as TV director
- Patricio Castillo as El Sábanas
- Paco Ignacio Taibo as Ceferino
- Mari Carmen Taibo as Ceferino's wife
- Betty Meléndez as Woman from Asturias
- Beatriz Fernández as Woman from Asturias
- Miguel Zaragoza as Man from Asturias
- Francisco Llopis as Man from Asturias
- Margarita Villegas as Don Chava's wife
- Yolanda Ponce as Manchas wife
- Amira Cruzat as Nando's wife
- Carlos León as Marcos, Rogelio's friend
- Ramiro Orci as Iceman
- Rodolfo Sánchez Loya as TV announcer
- Víctor Alcocer as Gorilón

== Release ==
The film was released in Mexico City a year and a half after it was shot. It was ranked 74th on the list of the 100 best Mexican films, according to the opinion of 25 critics and film specialists in Mexico, as published by Somos magazine in July 1994.

=== Release history ===
International publication date
Country	Title	Date
Mexico	Mecánica nacional	December 28, 1972
France	Mécanique nationale	January 8, 1975
Spain	Mecánica nacional	January 28, 1977
Hungary	Autós hétvége	October 27, 1977 (Filmmúzeum)
Poland		March 1978

== Awards ==
=== Ariel Awards ===
The Ariel Awards are awarded annually by the Mexican Academy of Film Arts and Sciences in Mexico. Mecánica Nacional received five awards out of 10 nominations.

Year	Nominee / work	Award	Result
15th Ariel Awards	Mecánica Nacional (tied with El Castillo de la Pureza and Reed, México Insurgente)	Best Picture	Won
15th Ariel Awards	Luis Alcoriza	Best Direction	Won
15th Ariel Awards	Lucha Villa	Best Actress	Won
15th Ariel Awards	Héctor Suárez	Best Supporting Actor	Nominated
15th Ariel Awards	Gloria Marín	Best Supporting Actress	Nominated
15th Ariel Awards	Luis Alcoriza	Best Original Screenplay	Nominated
15th Ariel Awards	Luis Alcoriza	Best Original Story	Won
15th Ariel Awards	Carlos Savage	Best Editing	Won
15th Ariel Awards	Manuel Fontanals	Best Scenography	Nominated

== Bibliography ==
- Mora, Carl J. Mexican Cinema: Reflections of a Society, 1896-2004. McFarland & Co, 2005.
