= Los Cachorros =

1973 Mexican film by Jorge Fons

- Directed by: Jorge Fons
- Written by: Jorge Fons; Eduardo Lujan; José Emilio Pacheco
- Based on: The Cubs and Other Stories by Mario Vargas Llosa
- Produced by: Leopoldo Silva; Marco Silva
- Starring: José Alonso; Helena Rojo; Carmen Montejo; Augusto Benedico; Gabriel Retes; Arsenio Campos; Dunia Zaldívar
- Music by: Joaquín Gutiérrez Heras; Eduardo Luján
- Production company: Estudios Churubusco
- Distributed by: Netflix
- Release dates: July 10, 1973 (Mexico DF, Mexico)
- Running time: 110 minutes
- Country: México
- Language: Spanish

Los Cachorros (The Cubs) is a 1973 Mexican dramatic film. Based on the novel The Cubs and Other Stories by the Peruvian writer Mario Vargas Llosa, the film was directed by Jorge Fons and starring José Alonso, Helena Rojo, Carmen Montejo and Augusto Benedico.

== Plot ==
It tells the story of a group of friends who stay together well into adulthood. The film begins innocently enough when the boy Cuellar (12 years old) enters a new school. He immediately makes friends with 4 other children. One day after a soccer practice while taking a shower, he is attacked by Judas, the school dog of the Danish breed that was running loose through carelessness. The operation leaves Cuellar without a Penis but with Testicles. Such an act leaves him with lifelong scars and this novel uses his development in adolescence and then in adulthood to explore the problems he faces. Both are sexual, obviously, but also his lack of hormones greatly changes his relationships with his group of close friends and he finds it very difficult to accept the fact that they begin to have girlfriends and then to get married.

When he meets the model Tere she falls in love with him but rejects him when she finds out about his condition and for this reason he decides to commit suicide.

Italian title: Eviration – Bramosia Dei Sensi

== Cast ==
- José Alonso – Cuéllar
  - Alejandro Rojo de la Vega – Cuellar (Child)
- Helena Rojo – Teresa
- Carmen Montejo – Cuellar's mother
- Augusto Benedico – Cuellar's father
- Gabriel Retes – Gumuncio
- Arsenio Campos – Toto
- Dunia Zaldívar – La china
- Cecilia Pezet – Rosalinda
- Pedro Damián – Perico
- Silvia Mariscal – Chabela
- Eduardo Casab – Manolo
- Ivonne Govea – Rosalinda
- Luis Turner – Lalo
- Pancho Córdova – Teacher
- Ramón Menéndez – Photographer
- Ricardo Fuentes – Teacher
- Sofia Joskowicz – Nurse

== Production ==
Los cachorros was filmed in the Churubusco Studios and on locations in Casa Requena, Xochimilco, Plaza de Toros México and others from October 4 and until November 13, 1971. Mario Llorca was assisted by the director, Leopoldo Silva and Marco Silva were in charge of the production and the production company was Marco Polo Cinematographic. The script was by Jorge Fons and Eduardo Luján based on a plot of the homonymous novel and winner of the Nobel Prize for Literature of 2010 by Mario Vargas Llosa. Editing was by Carlos Savage, photography by Alex Phillips Jr., musical direction by Joaquín Gutiérrez Heras and Eduardo Luján, sound by Eduardo Arjona and Ramón Moreno, makeup by Elda Loza and the setting by Ernesto Carrasco.

It was released on May 10, 1973, at the Cine Latino.

== Awards ==
=== Ariel Awards ===
The Ariel Awards are awarded annually by the Mexican Academy of Film Arts and Sciences in Mexico. Los Cachorros received two nominations.

Year	Nominee / work	Award	Result
15th Ariel Awards	Helena Rojo	Best Actress	Nominated
15th Ariel Awards	Eduardo Luján, Joaquín Gutiérrez Heras	Best Original Score	Nominated
