= Reed: Insurgent Mexico =

1973 film

- Film poster
- Spanish: Reed: México Insurgente
- Directed by: Paul Leduc
- Written by: Juan Tovar; Paul Leduc; Emilio Carballido
- Based on: Insurgent Mexico by John Reed
- Produced by: Salvador López; Bertha Navarro; Luis Barranco
- Starring: Claudio Obregón
- Cinematography: Alexis Grivas
- Edited by: Rafael Castanedo; Giovanni Korporaal
- Production company: Ollín y Asociados
- Release date: 5 January 1973
- Running time: 124 minutes
- Country: Mexico
- Language: Spanish

Reed: Insurgent Mexico (Spanish: Reed, México insurgente) is a 1973 Mexican drama film directed by Paul Leduc. It was selected as the Mexican entry for the Best Foreign Language Film at the 46th Academy Awards, but was not accepted as a nominee. The film is based on John Reed's book Insurgent Mexico, a collection of Reed's accounts of the Mexican Revolution.

== Cast ==
- Claudio Obregón as John Reed
- Eduardo López Rojas as Gral. Tomás Urbina
- Ernesto Gómez Cruz as Pablo Seanez
- Juan Ángel Martínez as Julian Reyes
- Carlos Castañón as Fidencio Soto
- Víctor Fosado as Isidro Anaya
- Lynn Tillet as Isabel
- Hugo Velázquez as Longion Guereca
- Heraclio Zepeda as Pancho Villa
- Carlos Fernández del Real as Felipe Angeles
- Max Kerlow as Antonio Swafeyta

== Awards ==
=== Ariel Awards ===
The Ariel Awards are awarded annually by the Mexican Academy of Film Arts and Sciences in Mexico. Reed: Mexico Insurgente received one award out of four nominations.

| Year | Nominee / work | Award | Result |
|---|---|---|---|
| 15th Ariel Awards | Mecánica Nacional (tied with El Castillo de la Pureza and Mecánica Nacional) | Best Picture | Won |
| 15th Ariel Awards | Paul Leduc | Best Direction | Nominated |
| 15th Ariel Awards | Alexis Grivas | Best Cinematography | Nominated |
| 15th Ariel Awards | Giovanni Korporaal, Rafael Castanedo | Best Editing | Nominated |

== See also ==
- List of submissions to the 46th Academy Awards for Best Foreign Language Film
- List of Mexican submissions for the Academy Award for Best Foreign Language Film
- Reds (1981 film, with Warren Beatty as John Reed)
- Red Bells (1982 film, with Franco Nero as John Reed)
