= Lucha Villa =

Mexican actress and singer (born 1936)

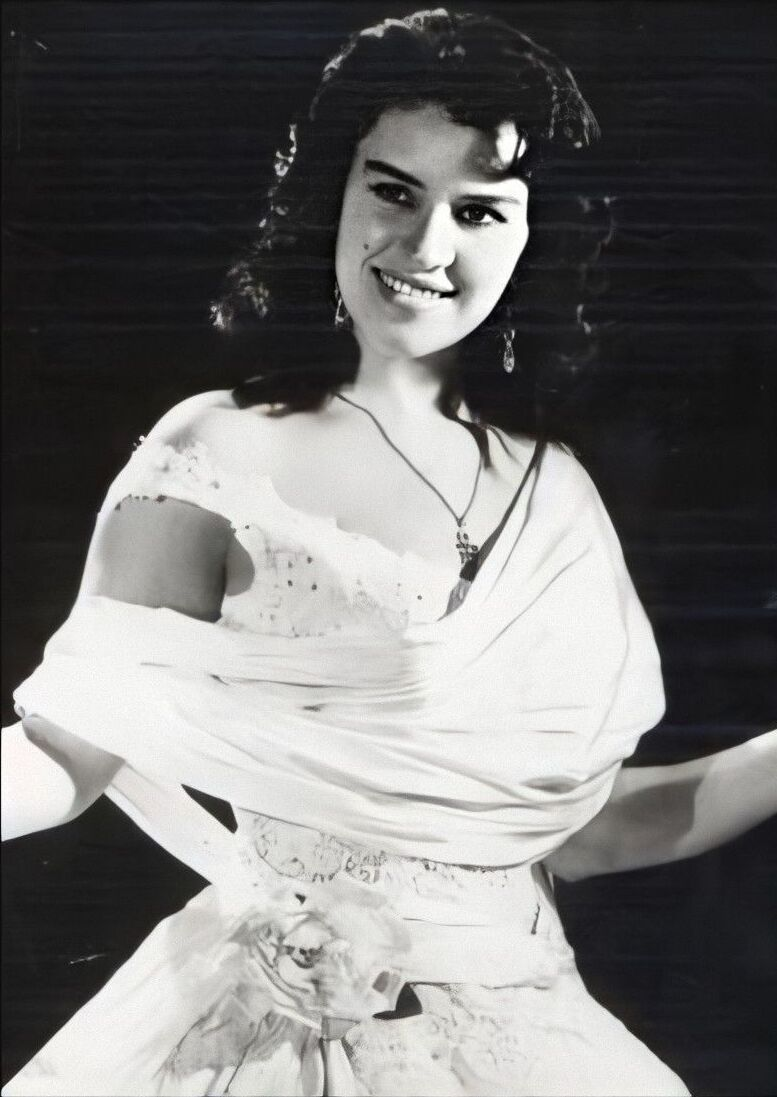
- Villa in 1961
- Born: Luz Elena Ruiz Bejarano; November 30, 1936 (age 89); Camargo, Chihuahua, Mexico
- Other names: "La Grandota de Camargo" "La Ronca de Chihuahua" "La Reina de los Palenques"
- Occupations: Singer; actress
- Musical career
- Genres: Regional Mexican
- Instruments: Vocals
- Years active: 1960–1997
- Label: Musart

Luz Elena Ruiz Bejarano (born November 30, 1936), more commonly known by her stage name Lucha Villa, is a Mexican singer and actress, specialized in the musical genres of ranchera and mariachi.

== Early life ==
Born in Santa Rosalía de Camargo, Chihuahua, Luz Elena Ruiz Bejarano was given her pseudonym "Lucha Villa" by television producer Luis G. Dillon ("Lucha" a hypocorism for Luz Elena, and "Villa" in honor of Pancho Villa). She has been a constant presence in popular music and film since the early 1960s. Villa's early hits included "Media vuelta", by José Alfredo Jiménez, as well as "La cruz del cielo" and "Viva quien sabe querer"

In the 1970s, Lucha Villa traveled to Denver, Colorado to perform for a benefit for the Crusade for Justice, youth programs and school.

In 1996, Villa, along with Lola Beltrán and Amalia Mendoza, recorded the studio album, Disco del Siglo: Las Tres Señoras, produced by Juan Gabriel, acknowledging their lasting contributions to music fanatics throughout Mexico and Latin America.

== Acting career ==
She appeared in several films during the 1950s and early 1960s, received her first starring role in El gallo de oro (1964), and starred in Me cansé de rogarle, a musical with Jiménez and recording star Marco Antonio Muñiz. She has appeared in some fifty films and won an Ariel Award for Best Actress (the Mexican equivalent of the Oscar) for Mecánica nacional (1973).

== Personal life ==
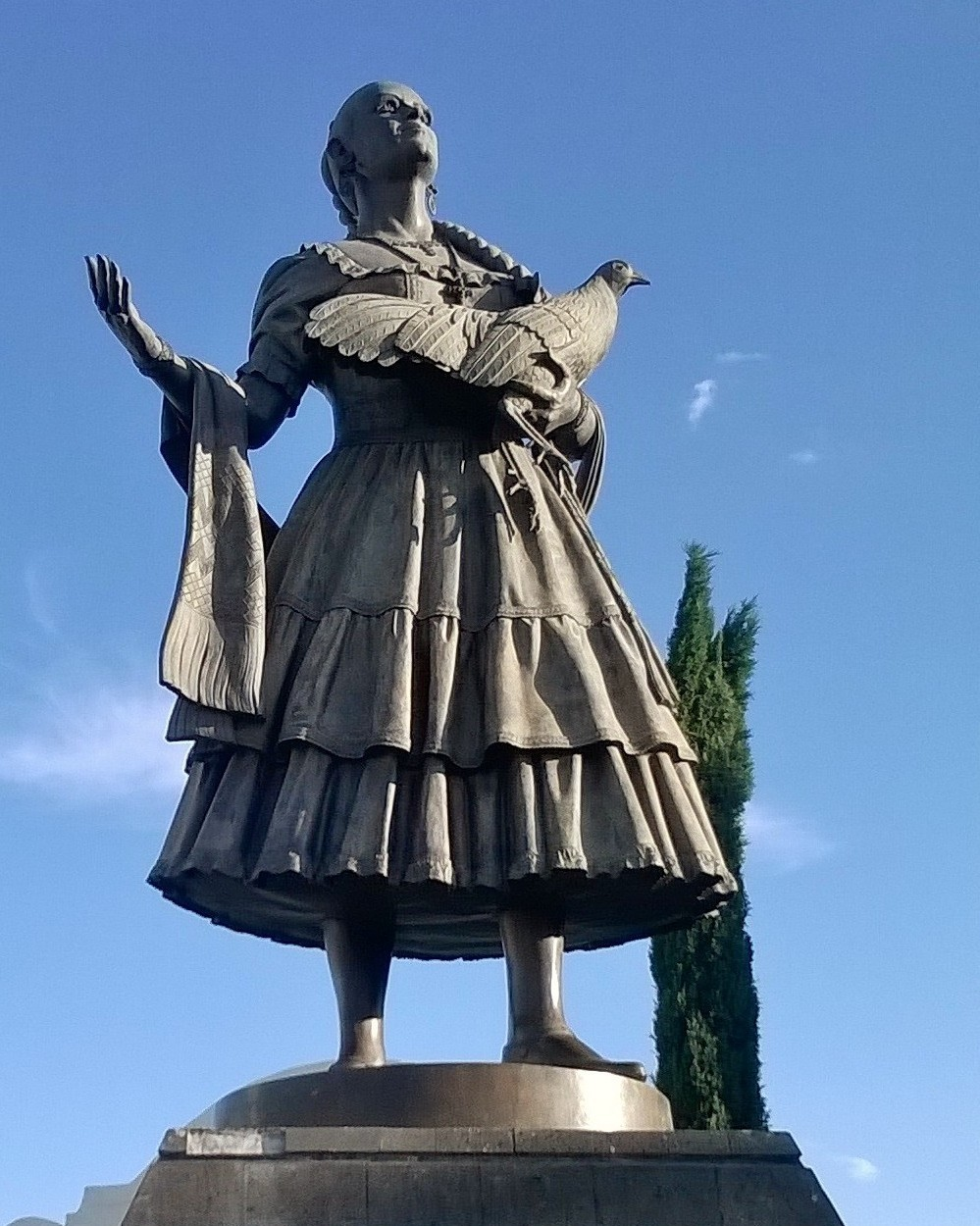
A statue of Villa

She fell into a coma because of complications during surgery in August 1997, but recovered after a long stay in hospital, and has appeared on television sporadically since then. She was married five times: Mario Miller (1951-1958), Alejandro Camacho, Arturo Durazo (guitarist for Los Apson, 1960), Justiniano Rengifo, (from Zacatecoluca, El Salvador, 1974), and Francisco Muela. Lucha Villa has three children: Rosa Elena (1953), Carlos Alberto (1954), María José (1974).

== Discography ==
Early in her career she made a collaborative album with Luis Aguilar on RCA Victor. Most of her output has been on Musart Records; she also recorded for Ariola and WEA [Warner Elektra Atlantic].

== Selected filmography ==
- Seis Días para Morir (La Rabia) (1967)
- The Empire of Dracula (1967)
- National Mechanics (1972)
