= Giovanni Korporaal =

Dutch actor, film director and screenwriter

- John Korporaal
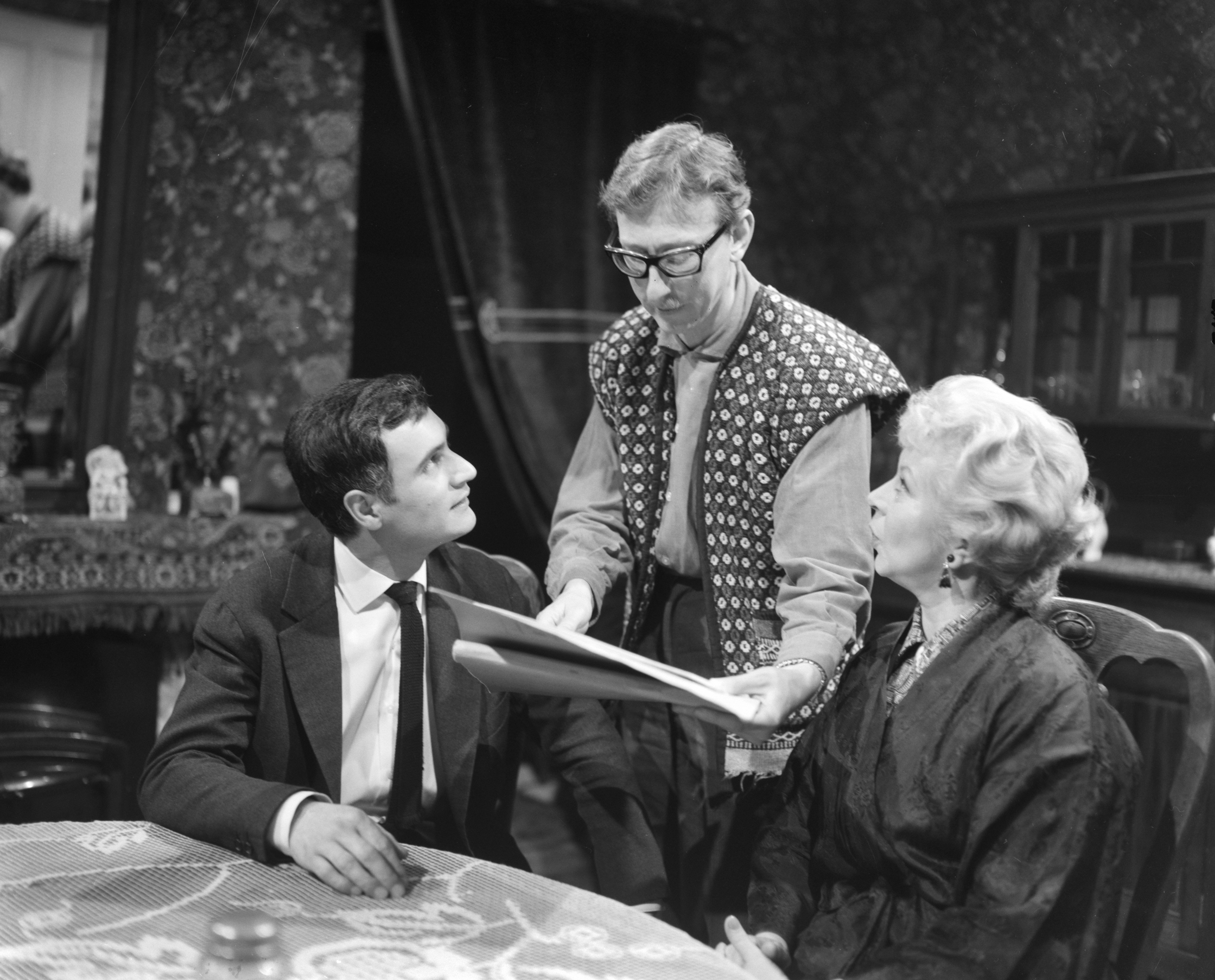
- Giovanni Korporaal, standing, with Fien Berghegge and Maxim Hamel at the set of Rififi in Amsterdam
- Born: February 14, 1922; The Hague
- Died: February 9, 2004; Mexico City
- Other names: Giovanni Corporale
- Occupation(s): Actor, video editor and film director

Giovanni Korporaal (February 14, 1922 – February 9, 2004), also known as John Korporaal or Giovanni Corporale, was a Dutch actor, video editor, screenwriter and film director who made a career in Mexico. His debut film, El Brazo Fuerte (The Strong Arm, 1958), a political satire that was barred from cinema exhibitions until 1974, is recognized as groundbreaking. In the Netherlands he directed two movies, De vergeten medeminnaar (The forgotten co-lover, 1963) and Rififi in Amsterdam (1962).

== Biography ==
Korporaal was the son of a Dutch father and a French mother. His father was journalist and correspondent in Italy. In World War II the family returned to The Hague where Korporaal attended high school.

=== Italy 1948–1954 ===
In 1948 Korporaal started his career as an actor at the Centro Sperimentale di Cinematografia in Rome. Using the name Giovanni Corporale, he had a small role in Ladri di Biciclette (1948), a film with only non-professional actors that gained an Oscar nomination. Korporaal had small roles in another five films in Italy. In 1951 he was admitted to the Scuola Nazionale di Cinema, the Italian National Film School, to become a film director. In 1952 Korporaal was assistant director of Infame accusa, using the name John Corporale.

=== Mexico 1955–1961 ===
In 1954 Korporaal accepted an invitation by Morton Heilig for an assignment in Mexico. He stayed there and worked with Manuel Barbarachano Ponce in his company Teleproducciones. Korporaal was special effects supervisor of the documentary Torero! by Carlos Velo. He had settled quickly in the Mexican film industry of the 1950´s.

In 1958 he got to make his first film. El brazo fuerte (The strong arm) is based on the short story El Influyente (The influential one) by Juan de la Cabada. It narrates the life of a strongman in a small village. The film was made without collaboration of the actors union and used mainly villagers as actors. It is a political satire criticizing abuse of power. Pressure of the actors union prompted the Government to ban the film from cinemas until 1974. The film was screened only in film societies and festivals. The strong arm is therefore considered a groundbreaking film for the independent film industry and the genre of political satire in Mexico. Cineteca Nacional restored the film in 2018 and included it in their list of classical movies of the Mexican film industry.

El brazo fuerte was exhibited and well received at the Cannes Film Festival in 1961, including by the Dutch press who discovered their countryman.

=== The Netherlands 1961–1964 ===
Following the success in Cannes, Korporaal received an invitation by Joop Landré to make a film for the Dutch Filmproduction Company. Korporaal moved with his Mexican wife and their child to the Netherlands. The result, the crime film Rififi in Amsterdam, received mixed reviews. The film had prioritized entertainment over quality, by including songs by Willy Alberti unrelated to the narrative and by including the debut as an actor of Anton Geesink. Thanks to the box office success, Korporaal was able in 1963 to make a second film. De vergeten medeminnaar (The forgotten co-lover), a psychological fiction drama with Henk van Ulsen as the lead actor and music by Pim Jacobs, received critical acclaim. In spite of his successes in the Netherlands, Korporaal returned to Mexico in 1964 for personal reasons.

=== Mexico 1964–2004 ===
Back in Mexico Korporaal worked as video editor for Mexican television at the coverage of the 1968 Summer Olympics and directed a series of short documentaries. He did the Film editing of Reed: Insurgent Mexico (1973), a film that in 1994 was included by Somos Magazine in the list of top 100 Mexican films of all time. The editing of the film was nominated for the Ariel Award. In 1992 Korporaal was invited again to the Netherlands as guest of honour of the Que viva México! Film festival in Rotterdam. Korporaal died in Mexico-City in 2004, at 81 years of age.

== Filmography ==
=== Actor ===
==== Film ====
- Bicycle Thieves (1948)
- Golden Madonna (1949)
- Terminal Station (1953)
- Mid-Century Loves (1954)
- The Beach (1954)
- Toto and Carolina (1955)
- Chistelandia (1958)
- La manzana de la discordia (1968)
- Calzonzin Inspector (1974)
- Cosa Fácil (1982)
- Red desert penitentiary (1985)

==== Television ====
- Lo blanco y lo negro (1989)

=== Assistant Director ===
- Infame accusa (1953)

=== Video Editor ===
- Los pequeños gigantes (1960)
- La manzana de la discordia (1968)
- Familiaridades (1969)
- Frida Kahlo (1971)
- Reed: México Insurgente (1973)
- De todos modos Juan te llamas (1976)

=== Scriptwriter ===
- Boer Pieterse schoot in de roos (1950)
- El Brazo Fuerte (1958)

=== Director ===
==== Films ====
- El brazo fuerte (1958)
- Rififi in Amsterdam (1962)
- De vergeten medeminnaar (1963)
- El diabólico (1977)

==== Documentaries ====
- Olympia 68 (1968)
- El Pabellón de México (1968)
- Hacia un mejor entendimiento del arte (1970)
- Islas Marías, hoy (1975)
