= Rififi in Amsterdam (1962 film) =

1962 film

- Directed by: Giovanni Korporaal
- Produced by: Joop Landre
- Starring: Maxim Hamel; Johan Kaart; Jan Blaaser
- Cinematography: Eduard van der Enden
- Edited by: Lien d' Oliveyra
- Release date: 1962
- Country: Netherlands
- Language: Dutch

Rififi in Amsterdam is a black-and-white 1962 Dutch gangster film directed by Giovanni Korporaal.

== Cast ==
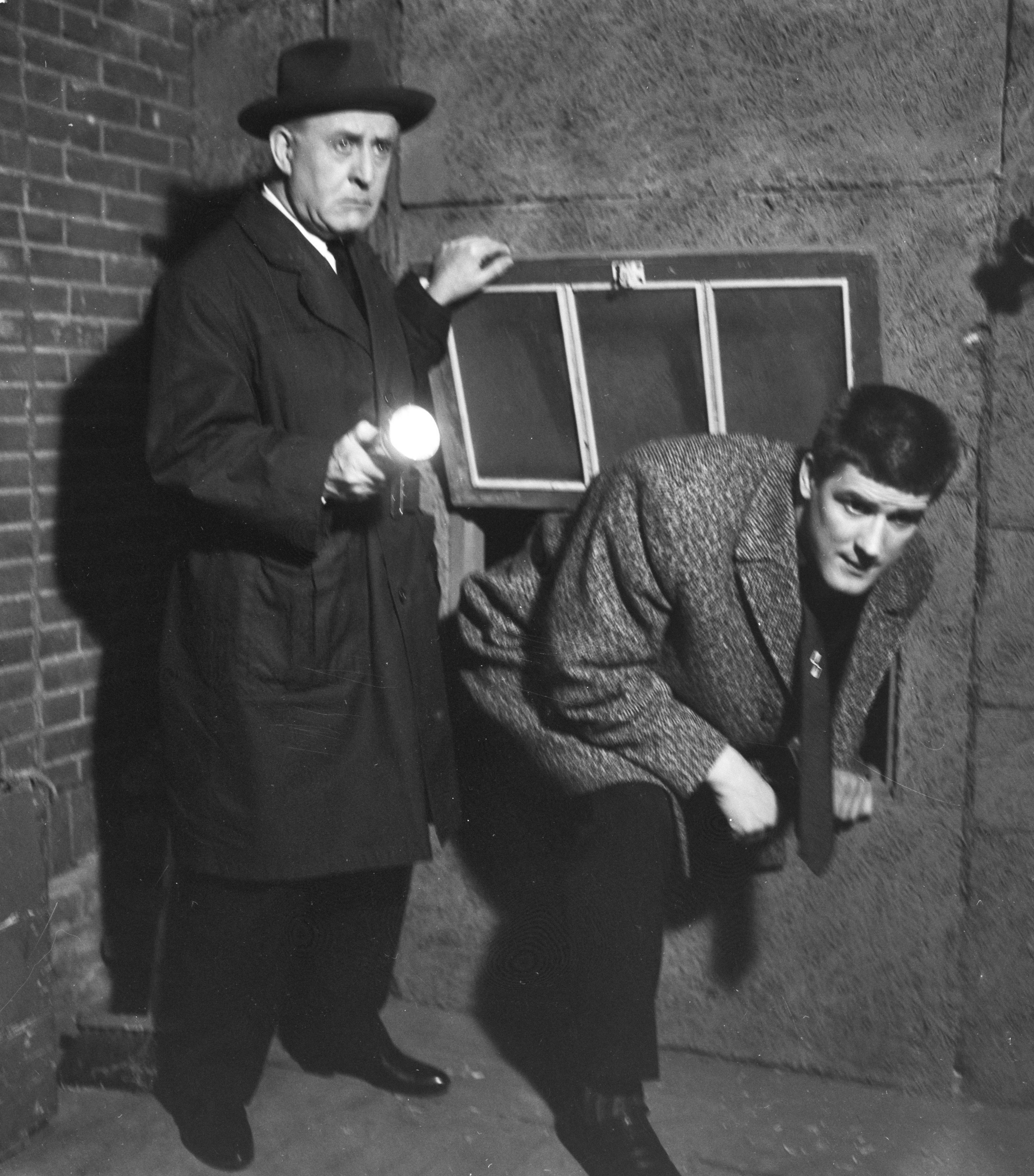
Johan Kaart and Anton Geesink (right) in the film

- Maxim Hamel as Bert Oliemans
- Johan Kaart as Commissaris Van Houthem
- Jan Blaaser as Lauwe Freek
- Rijk de Gooyer as De Bijenkorf
- Steye van Brandenberg as Blauwbaard
- Ton van Duinhoven as Manke Karel
- Fien Berghegge as Tonia Oliemans
- Els Hillenius as Blonde Nellie
- Willy Alberti as Kroegbaas
- Anton Geesink as Rechercheur
- Ton Vos as De Yank
- Wim Poncia as De Mug
- Frans Kokshoorn as Inspecteur Dijkema
