= José Emilio Pacheco =

Mexican poet, essayist, novelist and short story writer (1939–2014)

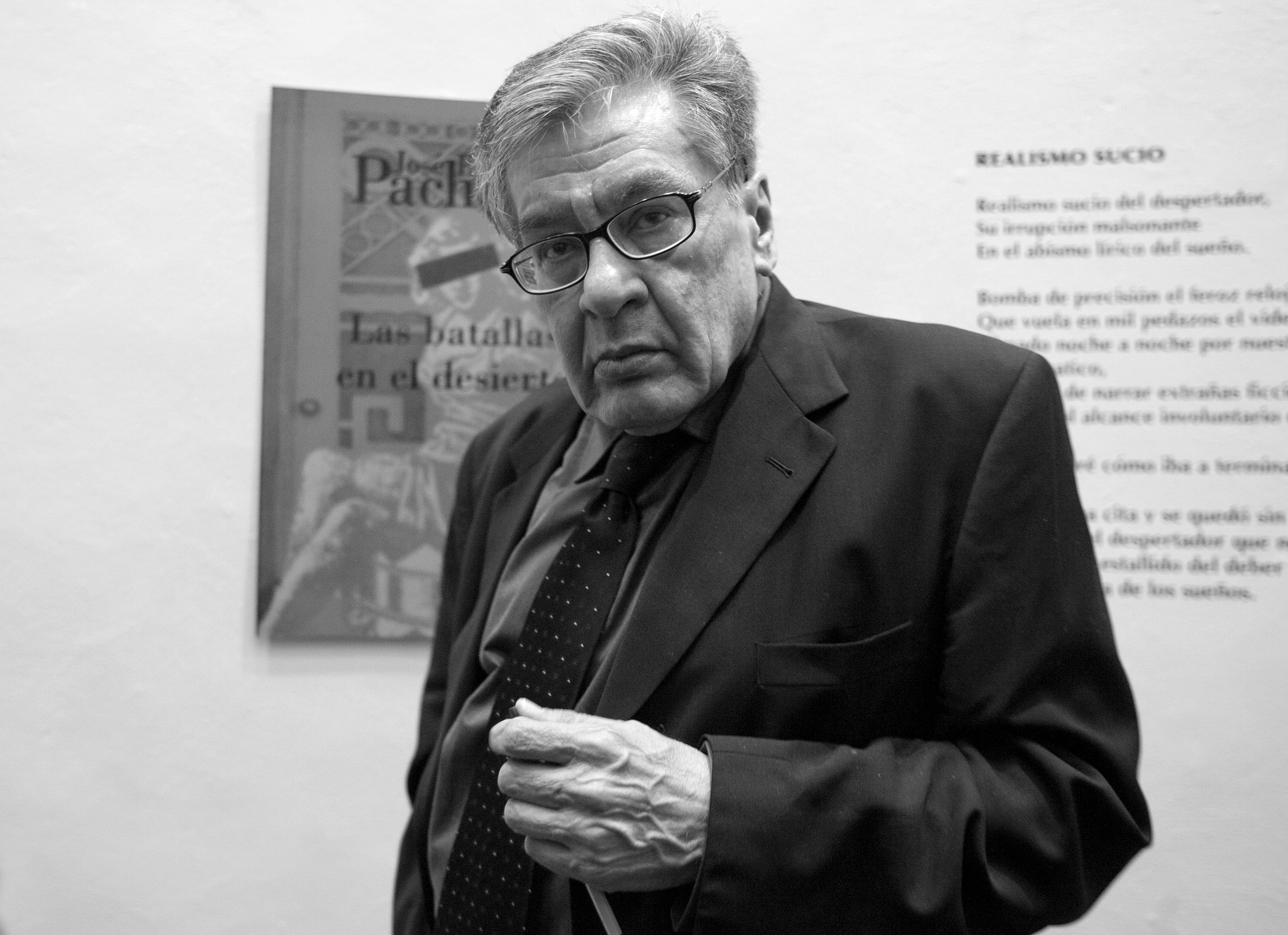
- Pacheco in 2009
- Born: José Emilio Pacheco Berny; 30 June 1939; Mexico City, Mexico
- Died: 26 January 2014 (aged 74); Mexico City, Mexico
- Education: National Autonomous University of Mexico
- Occupation: Writer
- Spouse: Cristina Pacheco (m. 1965)
- Children: 2

José Emilio Pacheco Berny audio (30 June 1939 – 26 January 2014) was a Mexican poet, essayist, novelist and short story writer. He is regarded as one of the major Mexican poets of the second half of the 20th century. The Berlin International Literature Festival has praised him as "one of the most significant contemporary Latin American poets". In 2009, he was awarded the Cervantes Prize for his literary oeuvre.

He taught at UNAM, as well as the University of Maryland, College Park, the University of Essex, and many others in the United States, Canada and the United Kingdom.

He died aged 74 in 2014 after suffering a cardiac arrest.

== Awards ==
He was awarded the following prizes: Premio Cervantes 2009, Reina Sofía Award (2009), Federico García Lorca Award (2005), Octavio Paz Award (2003), Pablo Neruda Ibero-American Poetry Award (2004), Ramón López Velarde Award (2003), Alfonso Reyes International Prize (2004), José Fuentes Mares National Prize for Literature (2000), National José Asunción Silva Poetry Award (1996), and Xavier Villaurrutia Prize. In 2013 he was awarded the Golden Wreath of the Struga Poetry Evenings festival in Struga, Macedonia. He was elected by unanimous acclaim to the Mexican Academy (Academia Mexicana de la Lengua) on 28 March 2006. He was a member of The National College (El Colegio Nacional) since 1986.

== Works ==
Poetry

- Los elementos de la noche (1963)
- El reposo del fuego (1966)
- No me preguntes cómo pasa el tiempo (1970)
- Irás y no volverás (1973)
- Islas a la deriva (1976)
- Desde entonces (1979)
- Los trabajos del mar (1983)
- Miro la tierra (1987)
- Selected Poems, ed. George McWhirter (1987, in English)
- Ciudad de la memoria (1990)
- El silencio de la luna (1996)
- City of Memory and Other Poems, trans. David Lauer, Cynthia Steele (1997, in English)
- La arena errante (1999)
- Siglo pasado (2000)
- Tarde o temprano: Poemas 1958-2009 (2009, Complete Poetry)
- Como la lluvia (2009)
- La edad de las tinieblas (2009)
- El espejo de los ecos (2012)

Novel and short stories

- El viento distante y otros relatos (1963)
- Morirás lejos (1967)
- El principio del placer (1972)
- La sangre de Medusa (1977)
- Las batallas en el desierto (1981)
- Battles in the Desert & Other Stories, trans. Katherine Silver (1987, in English)
