= Pulgarcito =

Pulgarcito (in Spanish, literally "little thumb") may refer to:

- Pulgarcito, the Spanish variant of the folktale Tom Thumb
- Pulgarcito (Mexico), a children's magazine of the Mexican government, 1925–1932
- Pulgarcito (Spain), a Spanish weekly illustrated magazine, 1921–1987
- Pulgarcito (actor) (born 1950), Mexican actor
- Manuel Ramos (boxer) (1942–1999), Mexican boxer
