= Adventures of Joselito and Tom Thumb =

1960 film by René Cardona

- Directed by: René Cardona
- Written by: Emilio Canda; René Cardona; Adolfo Torres Portillo
- Produced by: Cesáreo González; Miguel Lecumberri; Gregorio Walerstein
- Starring: Joselito; Cesáreo Quezadas; Enrique Rambal
- Cinematography: Alex Phillips
- Edited by: Rafael Ceballos
- Music by: Manuel Esperón
- Production companies: Cinematográfica Filmex S.A. Suevia Films
- Distributed by: Suevia Films
- Release date: 29 September 1960
- Running time: 87 minutes
- Countries: Mexico; Spain
- Language: Spanish

Adventures of Joselito and Tom Thumb (Spanish: Aventuras de Joselito y Pulgarcito) is a 1960 Mexican-Spanish musical film directed by René Cardona and starring Joselito, Cesáreo Quezadas and Enrique Rambal.

== Cast ==
- Joselito as himself
- Cesáreo Quezadas as himself
- Enrique Rambal
- Óscar Ortiz de Pinedo
- Anita Blanch
- Nora Veryán
- Arturo Castro 'Bigotón'
- Guillermo Álvarez Bianchi
- Alfredo Wally Barrón
- Florencio Castelló
- Manuel Capetillo
- Enrique García Álvarez

== Bibliography ==
- Bentley, Bernard. A Companion to Spanish Cinema. Boydell & Brewer, 2008.
