= Nora Veryán =

Mexican actress (1929–1998)

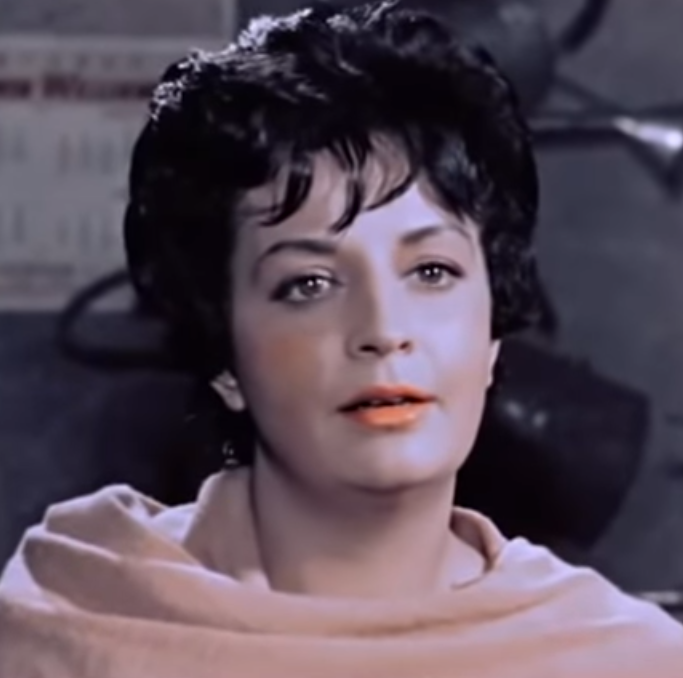
- Veryán in Santa Claus (1959)
- Born: 1929; Guadalajara, Jalisco, Mexico
- Died: 1998 (aged 68–69); Mexico City, Mexico
- Occupation: Actor
- Years active: 1948-1994 (film)
- Children: 1

Nora Veryán (1929–1998) was a Mexican film actress. She was married to Mexican film actor Raúl Meraz but later separated. The couple had one son together.

== Selected filmography ==
- A Family Like Many Others (1949)
- Veracruz Passion (1950)
- We Maids (1951)
- The Lone Wolf (1952)
- It Happened in Mexico (1958)
- Santa Claus (1959)
- His First Love (1960)
- Adventures of Joselito and Tom Thumb (1960)
- La diligencia de la muerte (1961)
- Memorias de mi general (1961)
- La pantera de monte escondido (1962)
- Imperio de cristal (1994-1995)

== Bibliography ==
- Rogelio Agrasánchez. Guillermo Calles: A Biography of the Actor and Mexican Cinema Pioneer. McFarland, 2010.
