= Tom Thumb and Little Red Riding Hood =

- Theatrical release poster
- Directed by: Roberto Rodríguez
- Written by: Fernando Morales Ortiz; Adolfo Torres Portillo; Sergio Magana Esquival
- Produced by: Manuel Rojeda
- Starring: José Elías Moreno; Manuel Valdés; Ofelia Guilmáin
- Cinematography: Rosalio Solano
- Music by: Raul Lavista
- Production companies: Estudios Churubusco; Películas Rodríguez
- Distributed by: K. Gordon Murray Productions (United States)
- Release date: 1962
- Running time: 85 minutes
- Country: Mexico
- Language: Spanish

Tom Thumb and Little Red Riding Hood (Spanish: Caperucita y Pulgarcito contra los monstruos) is a 1962 Mexican fantasy adventure film directed by Roberto Rodríguez.

The film features the Little Red Riding Hood and Tom Thumb in conflict with the Witch Queen and her minions. The queen resembles the Evil Queen from Disney's Snow White and the Seven Dwarfs (1937). Also depicted is the queen's overlord, the Devil.

== Background ==
It is a sequel to two other imported films, Little Red Riding Hood (1960) and Little Red Riding Hood and Friends (1961). The dubbed version of the film was theatrically released in United States by K. Gordon Murray in 1965. The film was also released on VHS by Something Weird Video in 2002. An uncut version of the film with English subtitles was released on DVD as Little Red Riding Hood and Tom Thumb vs. the Monsters.

== Plot ==
The film follows the adventures of Little Red Riding Hood (Maria Gracia) and Tom Thumb (Cesáreo Quezadas) and their friends, fighting against the powerful and cruel Witch Queen (Ofelia Guilmáin).

The film starts at the meeting of the evil monsters in the castle in the Haunted Forest, heart of the Devil's dominion, during which the Vampire (Quintín Bulnes) accuses the Big Bad Wolf (Manuel Valdés) and The Ogre (José Elías Moreno) of betraying the Witch Queen (La Reina Bruja, renamed the Queen of Badness in the English dub and resembling the Wicked Queen from Disney's Snow White and the Seven Dwarfs), who orders them to be executed.

Their friend Stinky the Skunk (Santanón) escapes, however, and informs Little Red Riding Hood and Tom Thumb, who promise to help. Meanwhile, the Queen and her sister the Old Witch cast a terrible curse, turning villagers into monkeys and mice for trying to defy her magic.

The rest of the story details the heroes' quest to save their friends and the children and put an end to the evil. They meet and defeat various monstrous minions of both the Witch Queen and her master the Devil until the final battle in her castle. With the death of the Queen, Big Bad Wolf and Ogre are saved and the villagers are restored to their human forms.

== See also ==
- Cinema of Mexico
