= Rumpelstiltskin (1955 film) =

1955 film

- Rumpelstilzchen
- Directed by: Herbert B. Fredersdorf
- Written by: Christof Schulz-Gellen
- Produced by: Alfred Förster
- Starring: Werner Krüger; Liane Croon; Günter Hertel; F. W. Schröder-Schrom; Wilhelm Grothe; Harry Wüstenhagen
- Cinematography: Ted Kornowicz
- Edited by: Lisa Thiemann
- Music by: Richard Stauch
- Distributed by: Förster Film
- Release dates: 9 September 1955 (West Germany); 13 November 1965 (U.S.)
- Running time: 82 minutes
- Country: West Germany
- Languages: German; English (dubbed version)

Rumpelstiltskin (German: Rumpelstilzchen) is a 1955 fantasy film directed by Herbert B. Fredersdorf. It stars Werner Krüger as the title character. The film was released in the United States by K. Gordon Murray in 1965 and re-released by Paramount Pictures in 1974.

== Plot ==
The miller's daughter Marie is demanded to spin straw into gold for the king. She has given up all hope until suddenly a little man appears. He wants to help Marie, but only under a cruel condition ...

Based on the fairy tale by the Brothers Grimm.

== Cast ==
- Werner Krüger as Rumpelstilzchen
- Liane Croon as the Miller's daughter Marie
- Wilhelm Grothe as the Miller Mehlsack
- Hermann Hartmann as the Coachman
- Günter Hertel as the King's son Max
- F. W. Schröder-Schrom as the King
- Harry Wüstenhagen as the Treasurer
- Helmut Ziegner as the Prime Minister
