= Santa Claus (1959 film) =

- Theatrical release poster
- Directed by: René Cardona; English dub: Ken Smith
- Written by: Adolfo Torres Portillo; René Cardona
- Produced by: William Calderon
- Starring: José Elías Moreno; Cesáreo Quezadas "Pulgarcito"; Jose Luis Aguirre 'Trotsky'; Queta Lavat; Leopoldo «Polo» Ortin; Nora Veryán; (all uncredited in English version)
- Narrated by: Ken Smith
- Cinematography: Raúl Martínez Solares
- Edited by: Jorge Bustos
- Music by: Antonio Díaz Conde (musical director)
- Production companies: Churubusco–Azteca Studios Mexico; Cinematográfica Calderón S.A.
- Distributed by: K. Gordon Murray
- Release date: 26 November 1959 (Mexico)
- Running time: 97 minutes
- Country: Mexico
- Language: Spanish

Santa Claus (also known as Santa Claus vs. the Devil) is a 1959 Mexican fantasy film directed by René Cardona, co-written by Adolfo Torres Portillo, and starring José Elías Moreno, Cesáreo Quezadas "Pulgarcito", Queta Lavat, Leopoldo «Polo» Ortin and Nora Veryán. This film marked the film debut of the actress Graciela Lara.

In this film, Santa Claus works in outer space and battles with a demon named Pitch, sent to Earth by Lucifer to ruin Christmas by exposing Santa to the public and "making all the children of the Earth do evil".

In 1960, a slightly edited English language dubbing of the film was produced for release in the United States by K. Gordon Murray. The film achieved wider recognition and a cult following after it was lampooned on a 1993 episode of Mystery Science Theater 3000.

== Plot ==
English-language version of film

On 24 December, Santa prepares for his yearly journey at his Toyland castle in space. He plays the organ while his children helpers from all over the world sing. Meanwhile, in Hell, Lucifer instructs his chief demon Pitch to travel to Earth and turn the children of the world against Santa (or else he will, as punishment, eat chocolate ice cream).

In a busy marketplace, Pitch attempts to convince five children to "make Santa Claus angry": Lupita, a poor girl; Billy, the son of wealthy but negligent parents; and three troublemaking brothers. Pitch fails at convincing Lupita to steal a doll from a vendor, but succeeds in convincing the brothers to break a shop window. Santa's child workers alert him to these events.

Unable to travel to Earth before nightfall on Christmas Eve, he instead uses equipment to watch Pitch and the children. One device allows him to view Lupita's dream, induced by Pitch, in which she is tormented by life-sized dancing dolls who entice her to steal. He also listens as the three brothers plot to break into Billy's home and steal his presents. They also attempt to write a letter to Santa claiming they have been good, but Santa's voice informs them that he can see all that they do.

Merlin the wizard, Santa's most trusted assistant, gives Santa a sleep inducing powder and a flower that allows him to disappear. He then retrieves a magic key that will open any door on Earth and prepares his mechanical reindeer. On Earth, the three rude boys plot to capture and enslave Santa. Meanwhile, Lupita and her mother say a prayer and Lupita says that she has wished for two dolls, one of which she will give to the Baby Jesus.

During Santa's journey, Pitch makes several unsuccessful attempts to sabotage Santa's delivery of toys in Mexico City. Santa succeeds in reuniting Billy with his parents, who had left him alone to go to a restaurant. On a city rooftop, the three brothers prepare to capture Santa and steal his toys. They see Santa's sleigh in the sky and hurry indoors, only to find that they have received coal. After a failed attempt to steal the sleigh, Pitch succeeds in emptying Santa's dream powder bag while Santa drops the disappearing flower.

Santa's trip is nearly complete when he is chased by a vicious dog outside a large house in Mexico. Finding himself without the powder or the flower, he climbs a tree to escape the dog. Pitch appears and proceeds to wake the household and calls the fire department to report a fire at that location, so that Santa will soon be seen by many people. With dawn approaching, Merlin assists with a last-minute escape and Pitch is defeated after being doused with the spray from a fire hose.

Before returning to the castle Santa makes one final stop, leaving a doll for Lupita. His labors now completed, Santa steers the sleigh back to the castle, content in the knowledge that he has brought happiness to all of Earth's children.

== Cast ==
Uncredited cast in the English version of the film included:

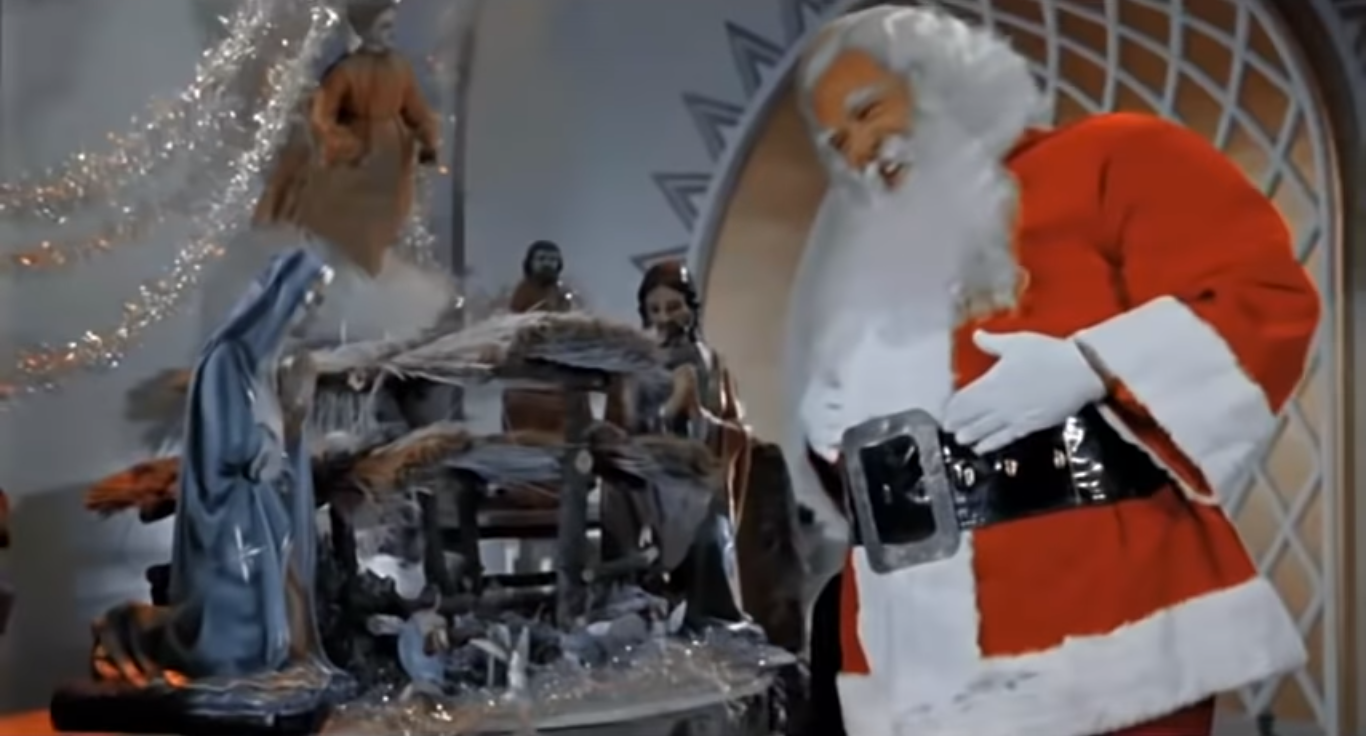
José Elías Moreno

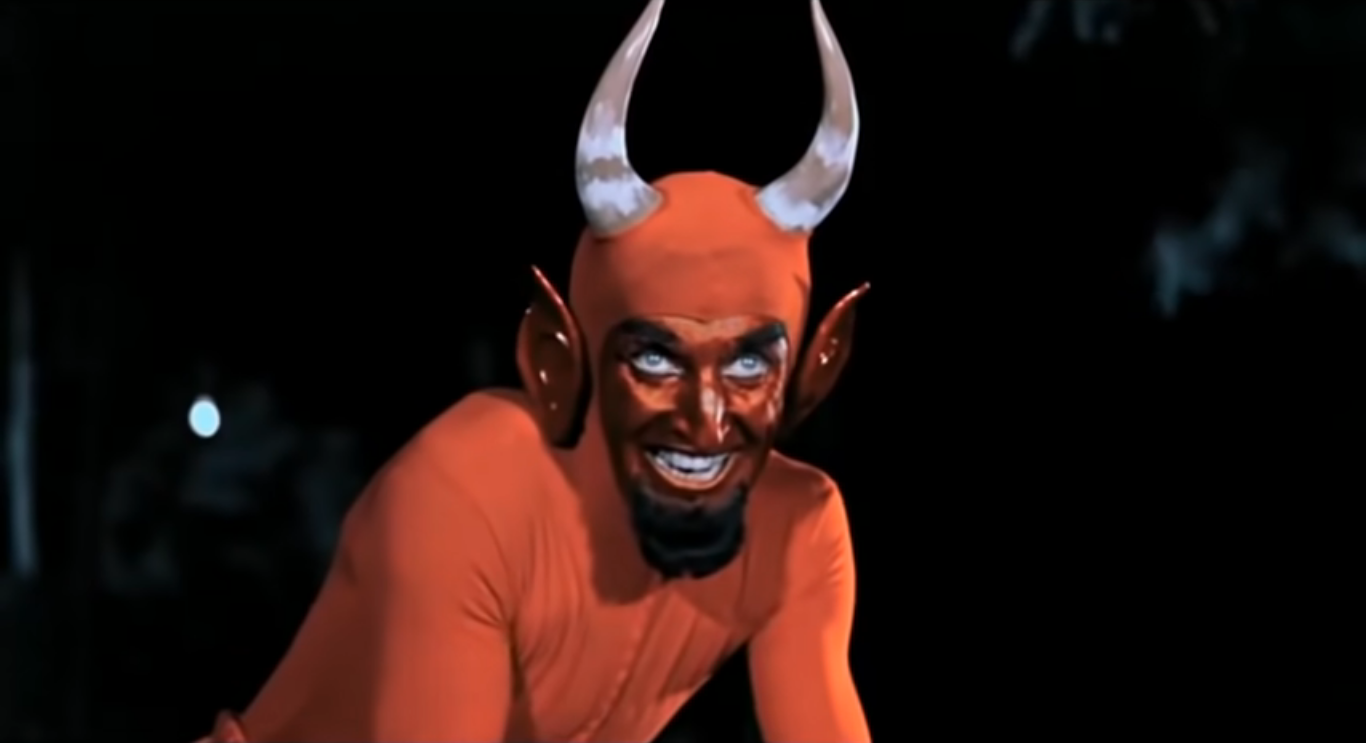
José Luis Aguirre 'Trotsky'

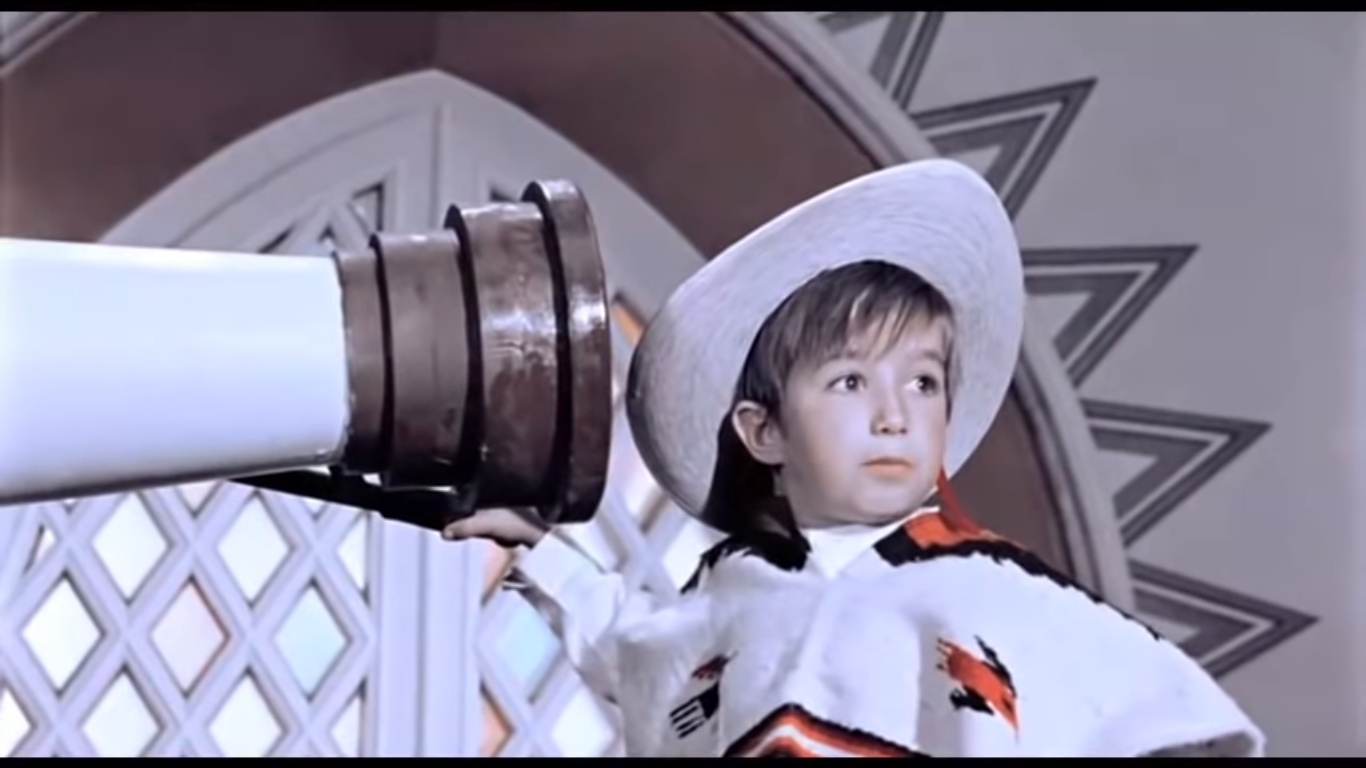
Cesáreo Quezadas

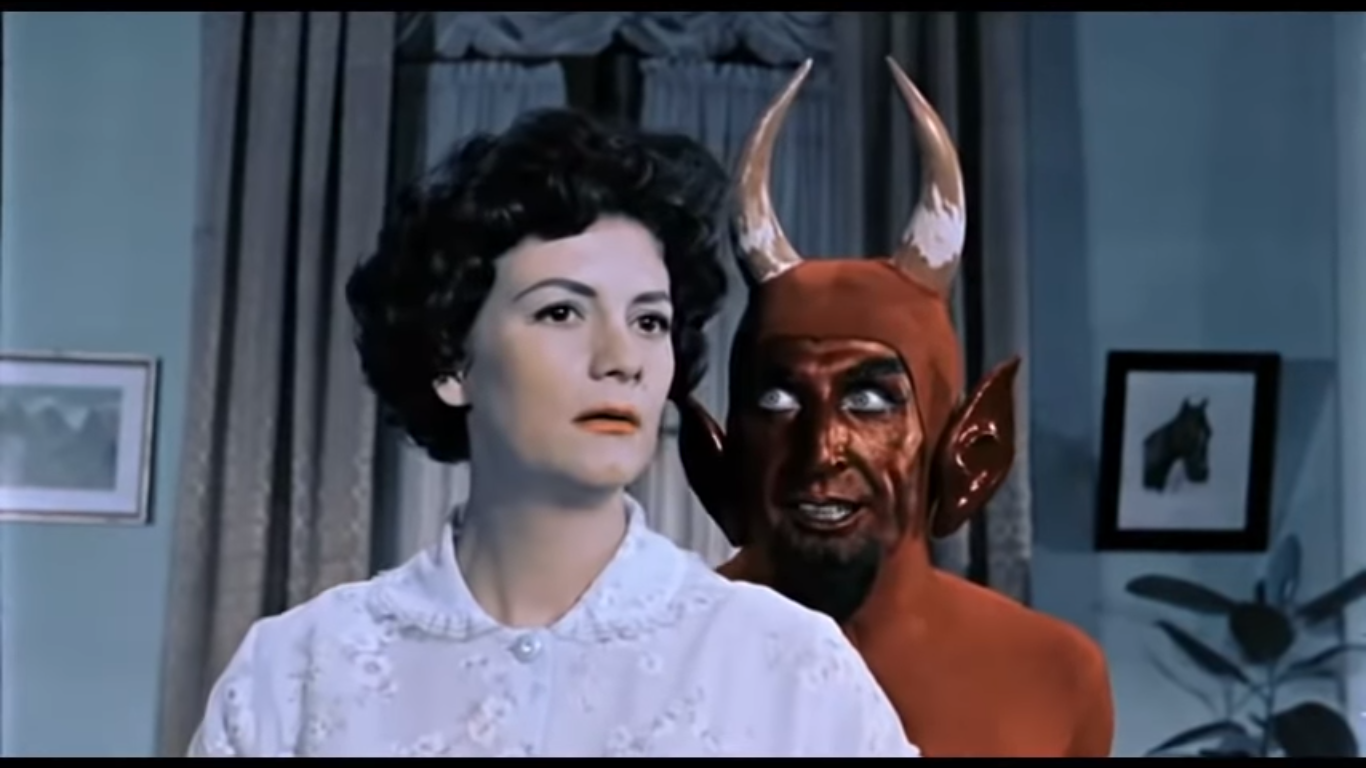
Queta Lavat

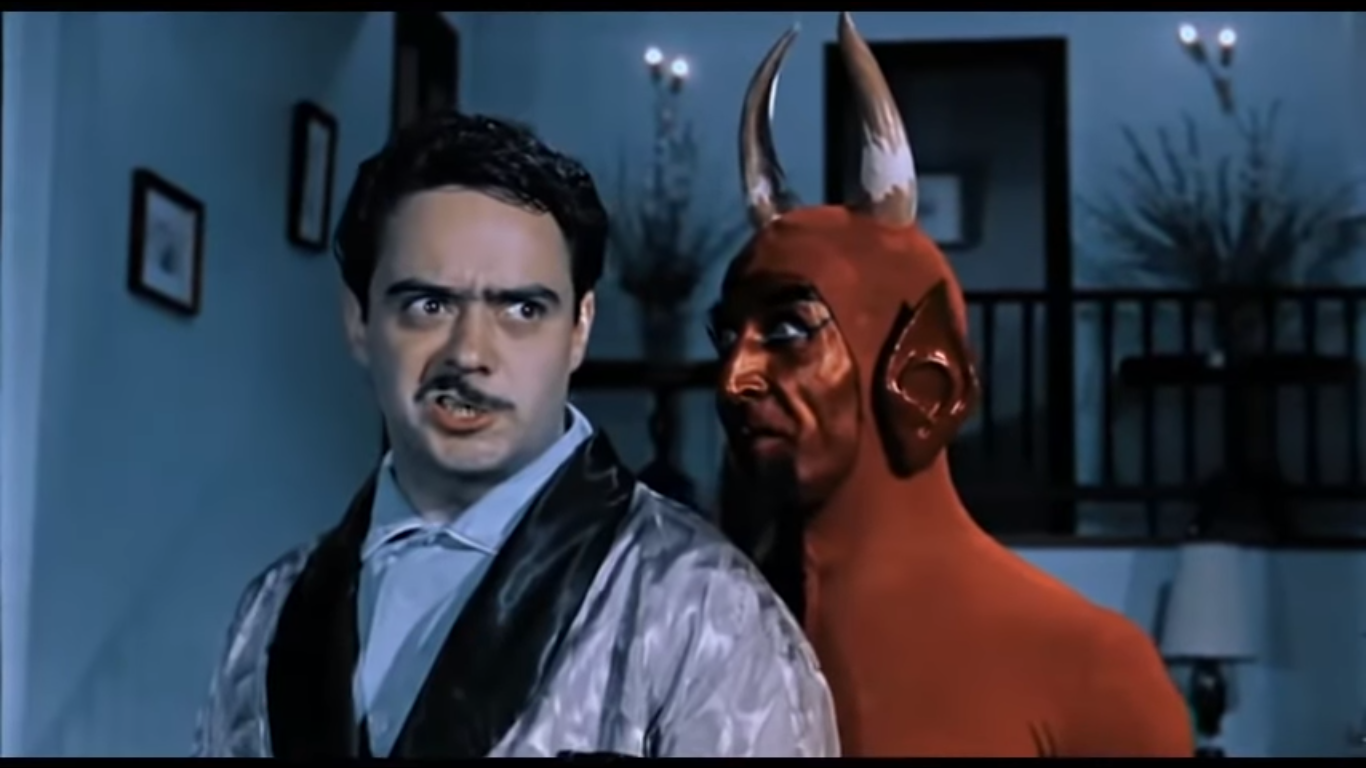
Polo Ortín

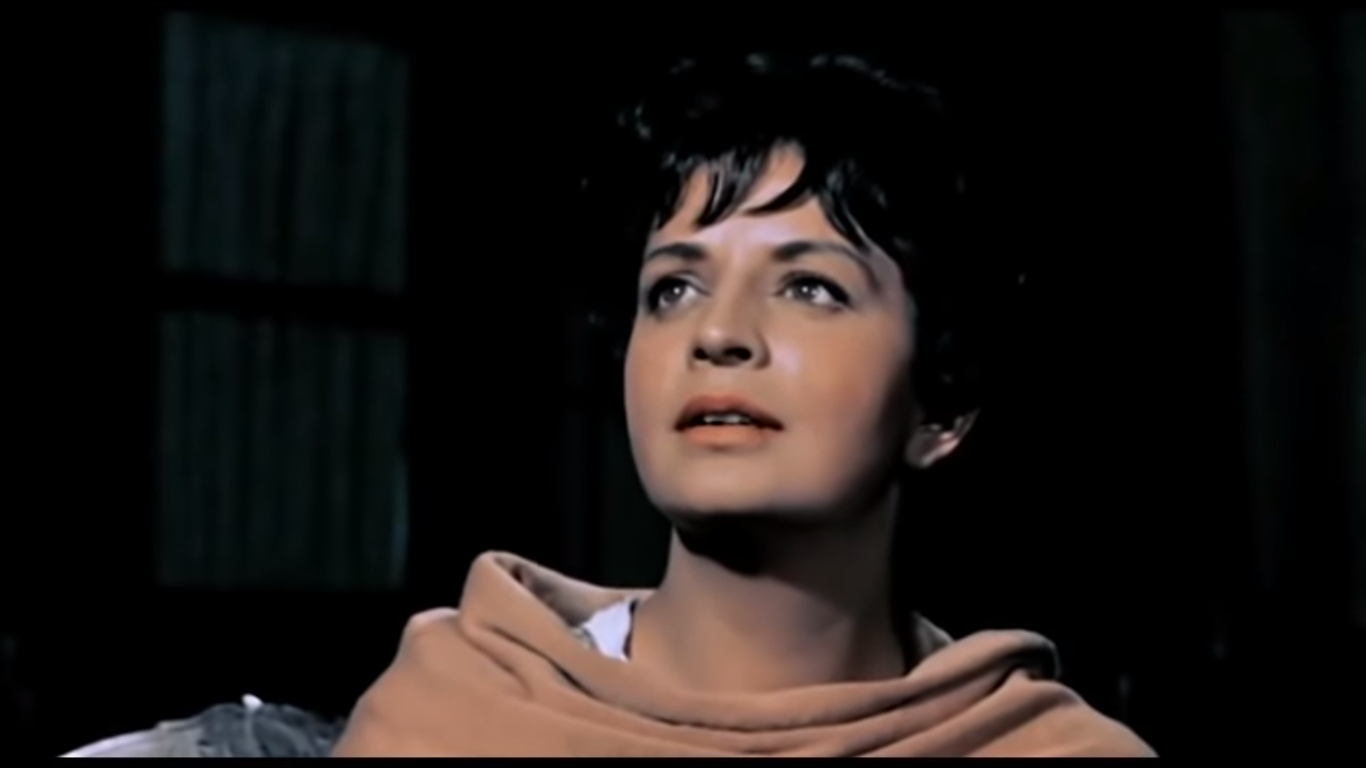
Nora Veryán

The English version of Santa Claus features only limited production credits and no cast information.

- José Elías Moreno as Santa Claus [uncredited in English-language version]
- Cesáreo Quezadas as Pedro [uncredited in English-language version]
- José Luis Aguirre 'Trotsky' as Pitch (Precio) [uncredited in English-language version]
- Armando Arriola as Merlin [uncredited in English-language version]
- Lupita Quezadas as Lupita [uncredited in English-language version]
- Antonio Díaz Conde hijo as Billy [uncredited in English-language version]
- Ángel Di Stefani as Vulcan [uncredited in English-language version]
- Ken Smith as the narrator [credited on-screen under the header "English Direction"]
- Nora Veryán as Lupita's mother [uncredited in English-language version]
- Queta Lavat [uncredited in English-language version]
- Polo Ortín [uncredited in English-language version]

== Production ==
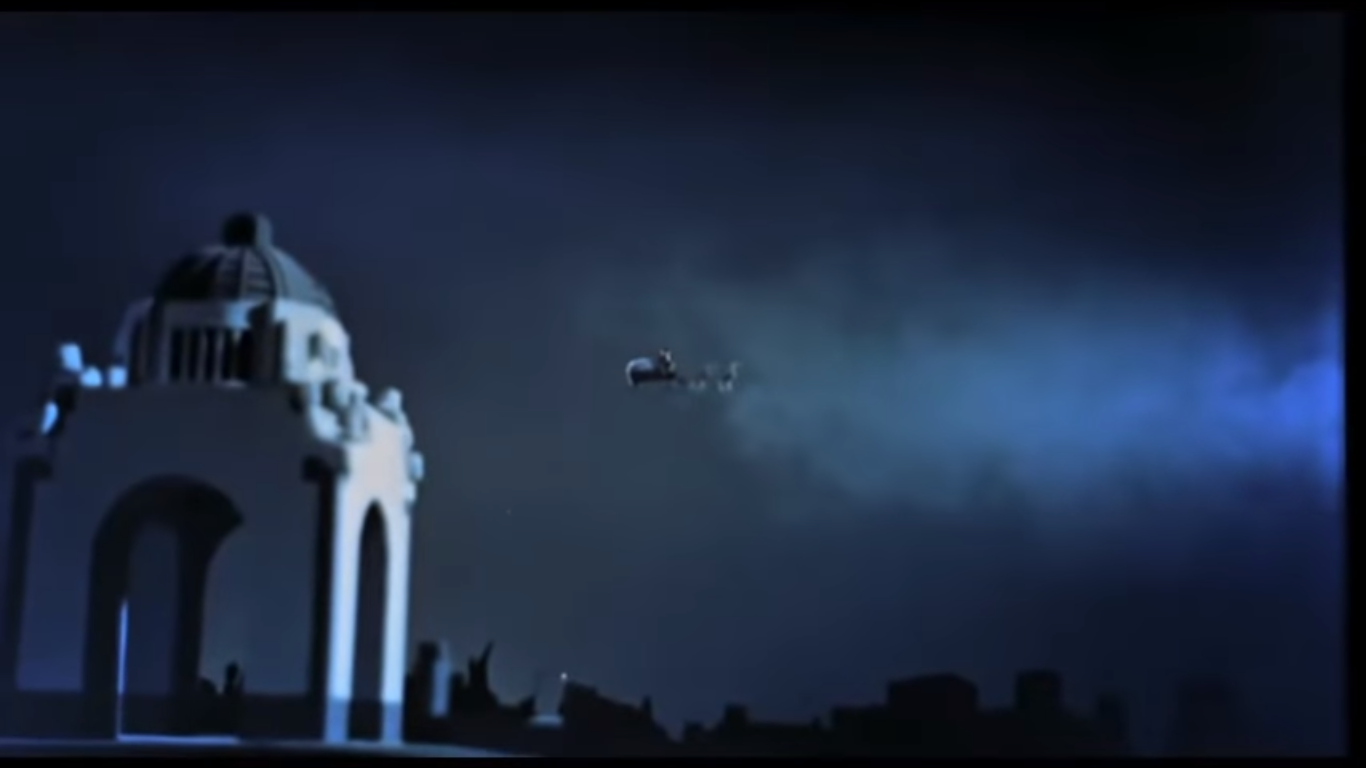
A scene in the film in which a model of the Monumento a la Revolución is shown

Santa Claus was produced by Guillermo Calderón and filmed at Churubusco-Azteca Studios in Mexico. Its running time is reported as 94 minutes. This appears to be the running time of recent home video editions of the English dub. At least one brief scene was cut from the English edition, and further footage was removed from the individual prints as they aged and suffered damage. The original film was approximately three minutes longer than the version now seen in the United States. Santa Claus was filmed in Eastmancolor with a monaural soundtrack.

== Legacy ==
The film was considered to be a financial success over several holiday season theatrical releases in the 1960s and 1970s. Broadcast of the film also became a holiday tradition at several U.S. television stations. The film garnered at least one award, winning the Golden Gate Award for Best International Family Film at the San Francisco International Film Festival in 1959. K. Gordon Murray would later produce a series of short films in the 1960s shot at various Santa's Village amusement parks incorporating footage from Santa Claus and characters from Puss in Boots and Tom Thumb and Little Red Riding Hood, consisting of Santa's Magical Kingdom, Santa's Enchanted Village and Santa and His Helpers.

=== Mystery Science Theater 3000 ===
The film was featured in the fifth season of Mystery Science Theater 3000 (episode #521), which first aired on Christmas Eve 1993. The devil Pitch became a recurring character on MST3K, played by writer Paul Chaplin. Chaplin said, "It's kind of a fun movie, and we all enjoyed it", noting that he made "quite an attractive demon". The episode is also the origin of the phrase "nightmare fuel"; during the movie, Crow T. Robot calls an animatronic Santa "some good old-fashioned nightmare fuel", and the phrase spread through MST3K message boards.

Santa Claus finished #21 out of 177 episodes in a poll of MST3K Season 11 Kickstarter backers. In his ratings of all MST3K episodes, writer Jim Vorel placed the episode 30 slots lower at #51, writing, "This movie just defies any attempt to understand it. It’s like something you would see in the depths of a violent fever dream."

The MST3K version of the film was released on 20 July 2010, by Shout! Factory as part of the Mystery Science Theater Collection Vol. XVI DVD set along with The Corpse Vanishes (episode #105), Warrior of the Lost World (episode #501), and Night of the Blood Beast (episode #701). The set also features extras including "Santa Claus Conquers the Devil: A 50-Year Retrospective", an original radio spot, a still gallery, and a teaser for Wonder World of K. Gordon Murray in Colorscope.

In December 2014, the stars of Mystery Science Theater 3000, now part of RiffTrax, performed a live riff of the movie to theaters nationwide.

== Home media ==
Santa Claus, a public domain film, was released on VHS by GoodTimes Home Video in 1992 and as a Region 1 DVD on 1 November 2004 by Westlake Entertainment Group. It was also released on DVD on the Holiday Family Favorites by Mill Creek Entertainment in 2008.

The running time of each version is 94 minutes. The home video releases were transferred from several theatrical prints of the film. These prints had suffered damage from age and routine use; as a result the home video releases contain several awkward splices and the color reproduction is poor. The film's also part of Weird Christmas on Fandor.

== See also ==
- List of Christmas films
- Santa Claus in film
