= K. Gordon Murray =

American film producer

K. Gordon Murray (1922–1979) was an American producer, most notable for his redubbing and re-releasing of foreign fairy tale films for U.S. audiences. He is often cited as the "King of the Kiddie Matinee." Murray also marketed many of the Mexploitation luchador films, such as Santo films popular in Mexico, changing Santo's name to Samson and dubbing them in English.

Among his more famous contributions are Little Red Riding Hood (1960), Little Red Riding Hood and the Monsters (1962), Rumpelstiltskin (1955), The Golden Goose (1964) and Santa Claus (1959), which he also narrated under the pseudonym "Ken Smith."

== Life ==
Born in Bloomington, Illinois, where many of the leading circus performers of the time spent their winter seasons, Kenneth "Kagey" Gordon Murray, son of an Irish-American funeral home director, occasionally spent his boyhood in the company of those struggling artists. By his teenage years, Murray had set up a "corn game", what would today be known as a bingo parlor, in one of his father's cemetery tents. He then took that corn game out on the road with West's World Wonder Shows Carnival, eventually rising to the position of manager.

During the winter season at Bloomington, Murray set up a network of quasi-legal slot machines. By the late 1930s, Murray was using his circus friends' various connections to aid a casting director to hire little people to act as the Munchkins in the 1939 MGM movie, The Wizard of Oz. Shortly afterward, Murray married his longtime sweetheart, Irene, a college graduate from Illinois State University. In 1949, Ken and Irene settled in Hollywood, where Cecil B. DeMille hired Murray to help promote his 1952 Academy Award-winning circus epic, The Greatest Show on Earth.

Ultimately, the Murrays moved to Miami, where Murray launched K. Gordon Murray Productions, making several deals with such top pioneers in exploitation filmmaking as Kroger Babb. He often changed the titles of his movies, giving them more sensational and more emotionally charged monikers, in order to sell them in a better way. The movie Santa Claus made so much money, that it is the only film in U.S. history (with the possible exception of Disney's Snow White and the Seven Dwarfs) to be released profitably in theaters every few years for three decades. When Murray saw this, he started to dub more children's fairy tale films into English, and by the end of the 1960s, he had been hailed by film critics as the "King of the Kiddie Matinee". To promote these films, he hired a local costume shop to create costumes for his two leading mascots: Stinky the Skunk and the Ferocious Wolf, both of whom appeared in a series of films based on the story of Little Red Riding Hood.

Murray released over 60 movies in 15 years. Toward the end of his life, Murray ran afoul of the Internal Revenue Service, which seized his films and took them out of circulation. But on December 30, 1979, before he could take the IRS to court to reclaim his movies, Murray suffered a fatal heart attack at the age of 57 while watching an NFL playoff game between the Miami Dolphins and the Pittsburgh Steelers during his visit to his sister-in-law in St. Petersburg.

== Legacy ==
Three of his films were featured on Mystery Science Theater 3000: The Robot vs. the Aztec Mummy in the first season, Santa Claus in the fifth season, and Samson vs. the Vampire Women in the sixth season. Santa Claus was also featured in a live performance by RiffTrax.

== Films ==
- The Prince of Peace (a.k.a. The Lawton Story)
- Why Girls Leave Home (a.k.a. Secrets of Beauty)
- Children of Love (originally French) (1953)
- Mother Holly (Frau Holle; a West German film) (1954)
- King Thrushbeard (1954)
- Hansel and Gretel (1954/II)
- Rumpelstiltskin (1955)
- The False Prince (1957)
- Mischief in Wonderland (1957)
- The Curse of the Aztec Mummy (1957)
- The Robot vs. the Aztec Mummy (1957)
- Wasted Lives (1957) (originally The Most Wonderful Moment, an Italian film)
- El Vampiro / The Vampire (1957)
- El ataúd del vampiro / The Vampire's Coffin (1957)
- Misterios de ultratumba / The Black Pit of Dr. M (1958)
- Little Angel (1958) (presenter)
- Santa Claus (1959) (narrator)
- Little Red Riding Hood (1960)
- Muñecos infernales / Curse of the Doll People (1960)
- Little Red Riding Hood and Her Friends (1961)
- El mundo de los vampiros / World of the Vampires (1961)
- El espejo de la bruja / The Witch's Mirror
- La maldición de la llorona / Curse of the Crying Woman (1961)
- La maldición de Nostradamus / The Curse of Nostradamus (1961)
- Nostradamus y el destructor de monstruos / The Monsters Demolisher (1962)
- Nostradamus, el genio de las tinieblas / Genii of Darkness (1962)
- La sangre de Nostradamus / The Blood of Nostradamus (1962)
- The Brainiac (1962)
- Count Frankenhausen (a.k.a. The Bloody Vampire) (1962)
- The Turkish Cucumbers (1962)
- Tom Thumb and Little Red Riding Hood (1962)
- Bring Me the Vampire (1963)
- The Invasion of the Vampires (1963)
- Puss N' Boots (1963) (originally El Gato con Botas (1961))
- Santa Claus and his Helpers (1964)
- Santa's Enchanted Village (1964) (writer)
- The Golden Goose (1964)
- The Swamp Of The Lost Monsters (a.k.a. Swamp Of The Lost Souls) (1965) (originally El Pantano de las Animas (Swamp of the Spirits) (1956))
- The Witch's Mirror (1962)
- The Wrestling Women vs. the Aztec Mummy (Las Luchadoras contra la Momia Azteca) (1965)
- Santa's Magic Kingdom (1966) (writer)
- The Pied Piper of Hamelin (1957/1966)
- Shanty Tramp (1967) (writer)
- The Doctor Says (a.k.a. The Doctor Speaks Out, The Price of Sin, Wages of Sin) (1968)
- Savages from Hell (1968) (writer and composer)
- Curse of the Doll People (Munecos Infernales) (1968)
- The Shoemaker and the Elves (1956/1968)
- The Princess and the Swineherd (1953/1968)
- Santa's Giant Film Festival of the Brothers Grimm (1969)
- Santa's Fantasy Fair (1969)
- Mother Goose's Birthday Party (1970)
- The Daredevil (1972)
- Thunder County (1974)
