= Pulgarcito (Mexico) =

Pulgarcito was a Spanish-language monthly magazine put out by Mexico's Secretariat of Public Education from 1925 to 1932. The magazine published art and writing submitted by Mexican children in order to nourish cultural nationalism.
