= Pulgarcito (actor) =

Mexican former child actor (born 1950)

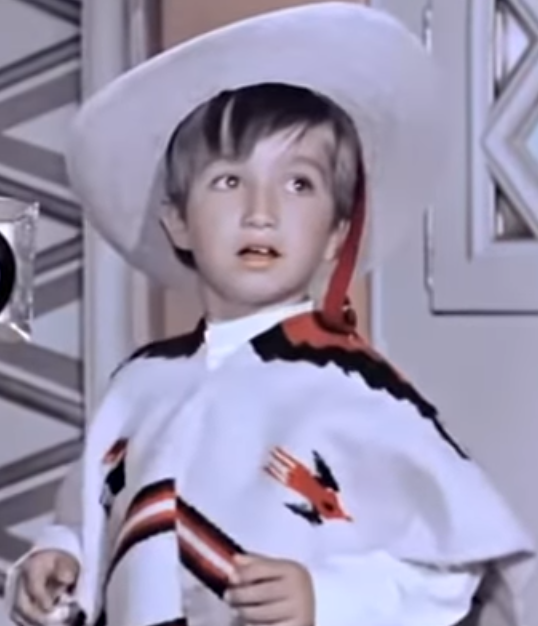
- Pulgarcito in Santa Claus (1959)
- Born: Cesáreo Quezadas Cubillas; December 18, 1950 (age 75); Mexico City, Mexico

Cesáreo Quezadas Cubillas (born 18 December 1950) is a Mexican actor. He took the stage name of Pulgarcito from the film of the same name in which he debuted in 1957. During the 1960s he achieved worldwide fame for acting in many films. However, in 2005, he was sentenced twenty years in prison for sexually abusing his own daughter.

== Biography ==
Cesáreo Quezadas made his film debut at the age of seven in a film by René Cardona called Pulgarcito in a retelling of the famous story of the Brothers Grimm. Following the success of his performance, and already known by the nickname of Pulgarcito, he starred in many films by Cardona and brothers Miguel M. Delgado and Agustín P. Delgado, generally in the role of a rogue boy, orphaned and needy, with an angelic and sarcastic look impudence. In 1961, film director Luis Lucia took him to Spain to star, along with Marisol, the film An Angel Has Arrived, which marked the peak of his career. Following the classic pattern of other children artists, in the mid-60's Quesazas saw his film career begin to decline as he lost the childlike innocence that characterized him. Even so, in 1966 stars in two other films Duelo de pistoleros (Duel of gunmen) and El Falso Heredero (The False Heir) with Joselito.

His later films saw the total decline of his acting career, with only supporting roles and cameos, causing Pulgarcito to fall into a spiral of delinquency that led him to perpetrate a robbery on 20 January 1971. With his face covered by a woolen balaclava and carrying a gun, Quezadas entered unnoticed the El Taconazo shoe store and shouted "This is a robbery!" surprising the clerk, who immediately fainted. Believing that she was dead, Quezadas allowed himself to be arrested and was taken to the Federal District Attorney's Office, where he was interrogated and confessed his crime.

Once rehabilitated and together with his first wife, Beatriz, he set up a printing company. He has four children from his first marriage: César, Marisol, Mariana, and Beatriz. He later had an affair with his secretary, Claudia, and his wife filed for divorce, accusing him of adultery. His second marriage produced two sons, Gridley and Guillermo, but his relationship with Claudia would be stormy and she, a designer and photographer, ended up discovering a video of Quezadas sexually abusing his daughter Mariana. On 30 April 2002, a judge in the city of Mérida, Yucatán sentenced him to twenty years in prison. He was granted an early release in 2021 due to his advanced age.
