= Saint George in devotions, traditions and prayers =

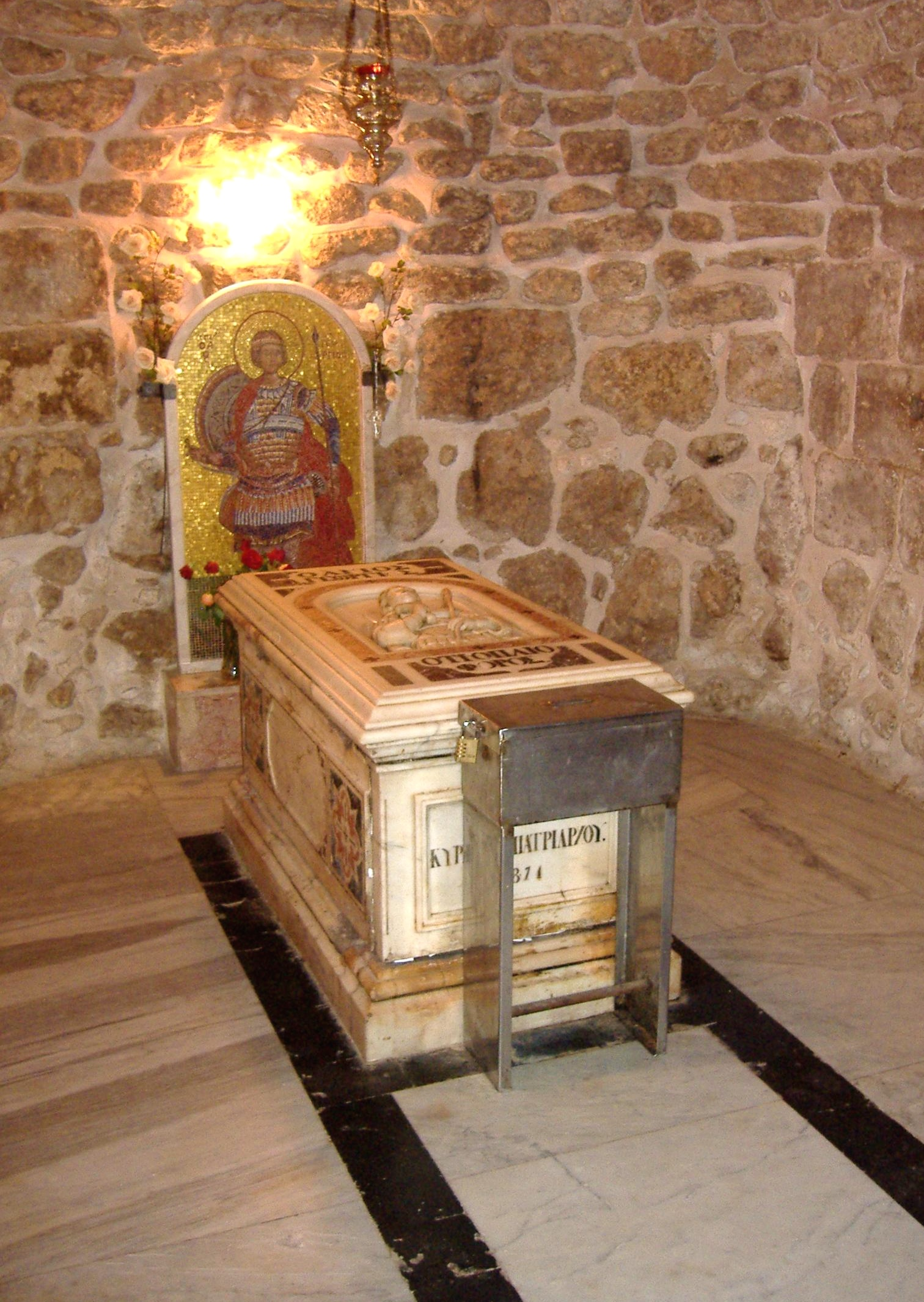
The tomb of Saint George in Lydda, just south of Tel Aviv

Saint George is one of Christianity's most popular saints, and is highly honored by both the Western and Eastern Churches. A wide range of devotions, traditions, and prayers to honor the saint have emerged throughout the centuries. He has for long been distinguished by the title of "The Great Martyr" and is one of the most popular saints to be represented in icons. Devotions to Saint George have a large following among Christians, and a large number of churches are dedicated to him worldwide.

Since the Middle Ages, the story of the life of Saint George, both as fact and legend, has come to symbolize the victory of good over evil, and become part of local Christian traditions, festivals and celebrations that continue to date. Saint George has been widely represented in Christian art in multiple media and forms, from paintings and sculptures to stained glass and reliefs, through the ages, and has become the subject of multiple prayers and devotions. This article traces the origins, development and growth of the Christian devotions, traditions, and prayers to Saint George.

== History and origins ==
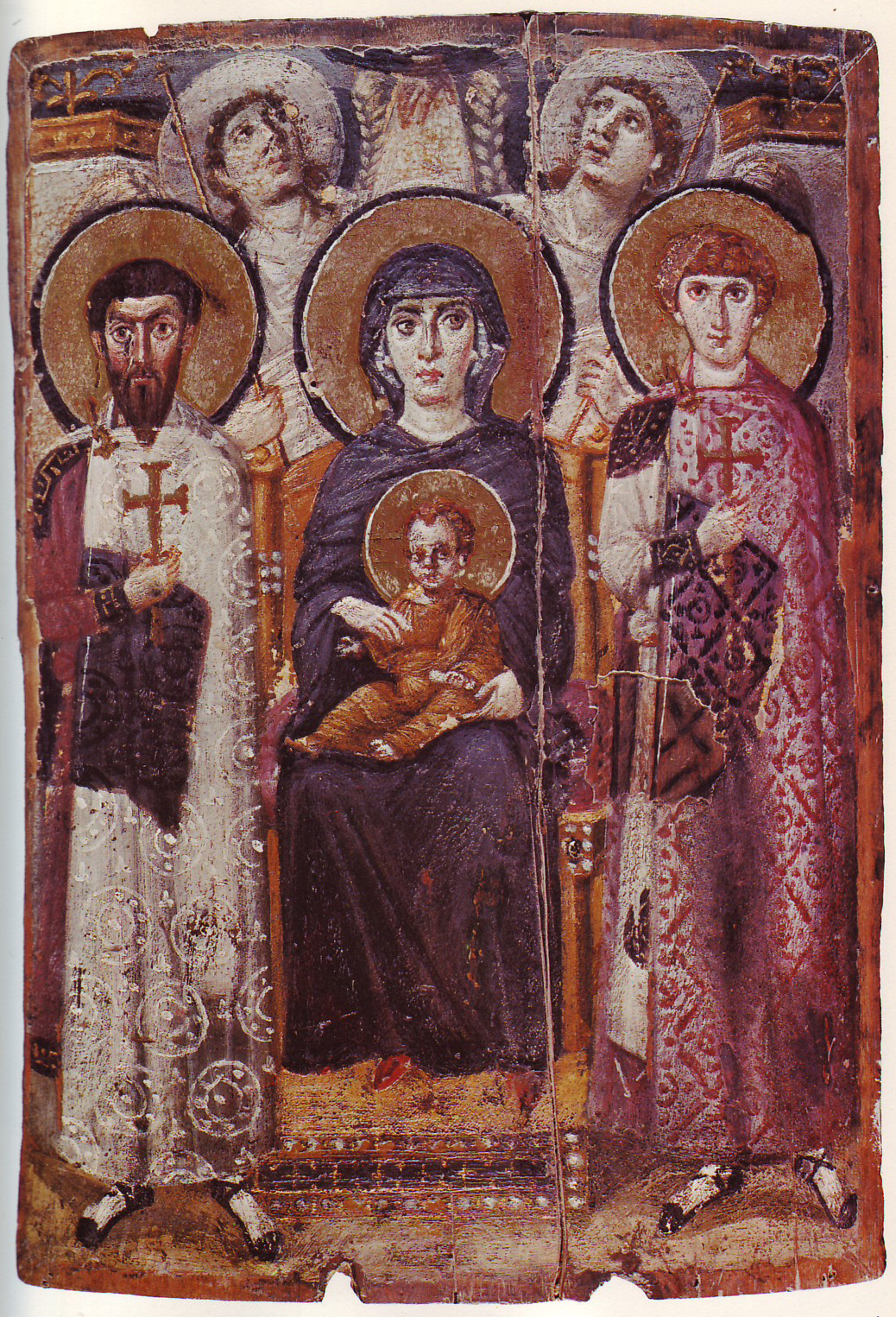
St. George with the enthroned Virgin Mary and Child, St. Theodore and angels. Saint Catherine's Monastery, late 6th century.

Aloysius Lippomani, the 16th-century Bishop of Bergamo, was one of the first people to undertake a serious study of Saint George. But modern scholarship really began in the 17th century with the group of Jesuit scholars called the Bollandists. Daniel Papebroch, Jean Bolland and Henschen provided a good account of the life of Saint George in Acta Sanctorum and it inspired other scholars to dispense with Medieval myths and perform detailed studies.

After multiple attempts by hagiographers, the time of Saint George's life was firmly established in the Bibliotheca Hagiographica Graeca as being during the reign of the Roman Emperor Diocletian in the late third century, rather than the mythical King Dadianus. A document found in the Vatican was signed by a witness Pascrates on April 23, which had previously been reported as the date of Saint George's execution, and had since become his feast day. The saint's father was established as a Cappadocian pagan senator Gerontius and his mother Polychronia as a Christian from Palestine, who raised him as a believer.

The saint's father died when he was young, and his mother inherited a large estate which she later descended to her son. He joined the army of the Roman Emperor Diocletian but during the Diocletianic Persecution of Christians declared himself to be one and tore down the Emperor's edict in defiance. Saint George was tortured and dragged behind horses through the streets but would not renounce his Christian beliefs. The saint was then beheaded on April 23, 303. A significant number of conversions to Christianity were reported after his martyrdom which led to his continued veneration.

St. George on the coat of arms of the country of Georgia

Saint Nino of Cappadocia, who was probably a relative of Saint George on her father's side, was taken as a slave woman and was moved to ancient Iberia (a remote part of the Roman Empire between the Black Sea and the Caspian Sea) in about 320. But she became a healer and confidant to the Queen of Iberia and spread Christianity and the story of Saint George. The Iberian King became a Christian after he was lost in the woods and found his way back by praying to Christ. Saint Nino initiated the construction of the first Christian Churches in east Georgia at Mcxeta, including a church where Svetitskhoveli Cathedral stands today. By the end of the sixth century, the Kings of Iberia had adopted the insignia of Saint George, from which the country of Georgia derived its name.

But the early devotions to the saint were not limited to the northern countries. In the sixth century Saint George as the Martyr of Cappadocia began to grow in popularity among Greek Egyptians and the devotion spread to other parts of Europe. By the sixth century Saint George had become the ideal Christian knight. In the seventh and eighth centuries stained glass windows in churches across Europe depicted him.

== Shrines ==
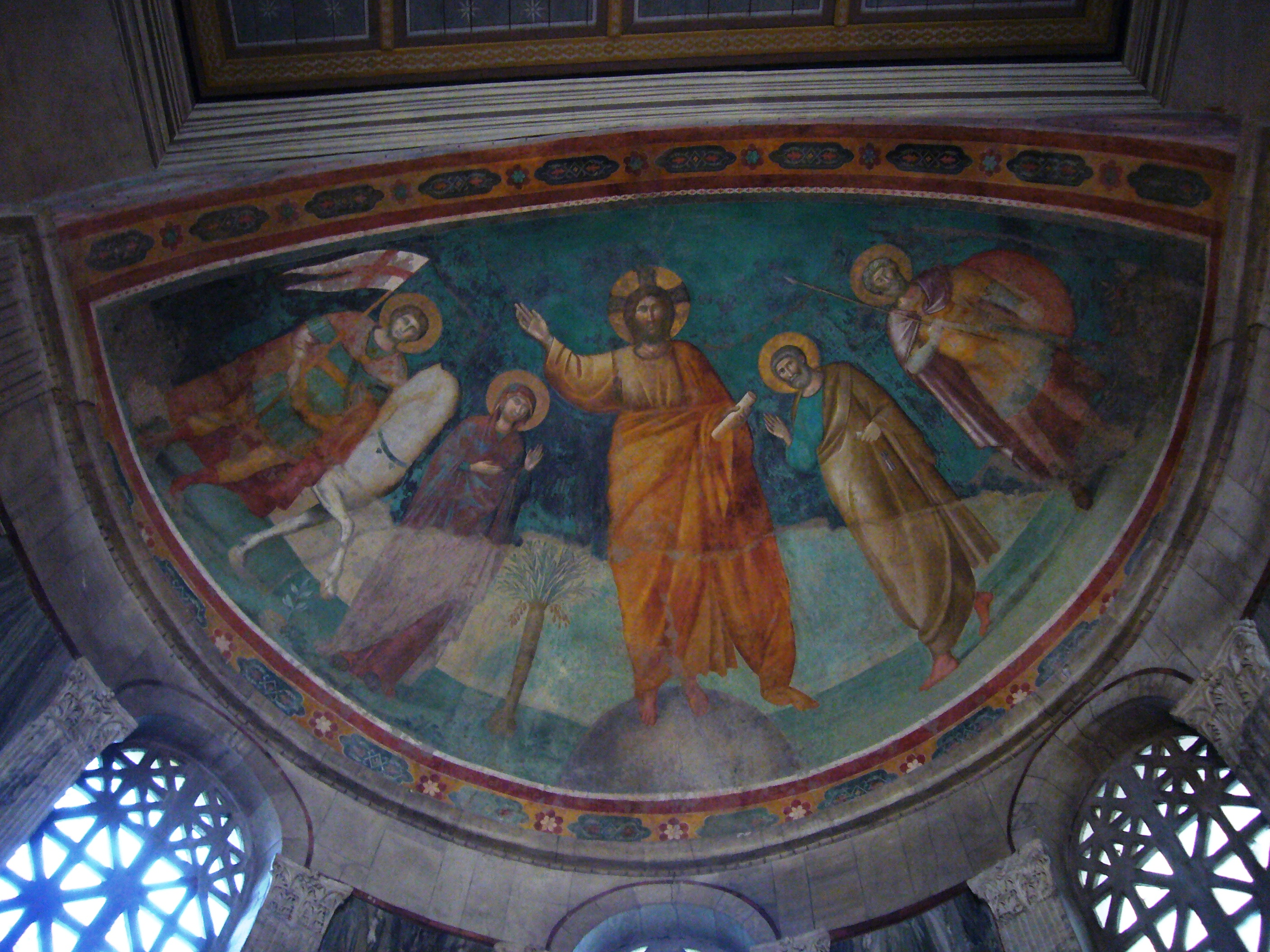
Fresco of Saint George (with his white horse) standing beside Christ and the Virgin Mary at the Church of San Giorgio in Velabro, the first Church dedicated to Saint George in Rome, in 741

The earliest dated Church dedicated to Saint George himself was first mentioned in 518. In Rome, the Byzantine general Flavius Belisarius put Porta San Sebastiano under the saint's protection in 527. In Sakkaia, Syria, in 549, the local bishop and two of his deacons built a martyrion dedicated to Saint George. Pope Leo II built a church for Saint George in 683 and the Church of San Giorgio in Velabro, which housed some of the saint's reported relics, was dedicated to him by Pope Zacharias in 741.

It is not known when a church was first built on the site of martyrdom and burial of Saint George. But by the time of the Muslim conquest in the seventh century, a large three-aisled basilica existed, with the martyr's tomb located beneath the main altar.

Saint George was venerated in England as early as the eighth century and devotions to Saint George and shrines dedicated to him continued to grow during the Middle Ages across Europe. Saint George's Abbey on the Reichenau monastic island on Lake Constance in Germany was founded in 888 and in about the year 900 Georgslied (Song of Saint George) was composed there as a set of hymns to Saint George.

Georgslied, hymns to St. George, c. 1000

The Sankt Georgenberg Shrine near Schwaz in the Tyrol in Austria is another example of a remote, but surviving shrine. By the tenth century a chapel was dedicated to Saint George on this mountain bluff that can only be reached on foot, and an abbey was established in 1138. Pilgrimages developed soon thereafter once a possible relic of the saint was reported and still thousands of pilgrims climb the mountain path each year. But not all churches dedicated to Saint George in the Middle ages were remote or built on a small budget. The Church of Saint George at Mangana, now partially excavated, was built by the bishop of Euchaita in the early eleventh century under Constantine IX at great expense and had truly imposing dimensions for any medieval structure. The techniques used in building the church signify the highest level of patronage.

Many churches were decorated with images of the saint, e.g. St. George's church in Staraya Ladoga, Russia, was adorned with magnificent frescoes in 1167. From this early period, Saint George was seen both as a symbol of courage for keeping his faith in the face of death and, having been a soldier, as one of the warrior saints who was at times depicted with Saint Theodore of Amasea. Saint George and Saint Theodore continued to be represented together in many churches, e.g. in mosaics in St Mark's Basilica in Venice.

Saint George came to be called on by Christians to aid them in battle and in time of great need, and upon victory churches were built to honor him. Festivals celebrating the ensuing victories became part of local traditions and led to increased devotion to him. He was portrayed in art as a protector and as a symbol of sacrifice, and the interplay of battle cries, prayers, artistic depictions and the construction of Churches in his honor led to increased devotion.

== Battles and patronages ==
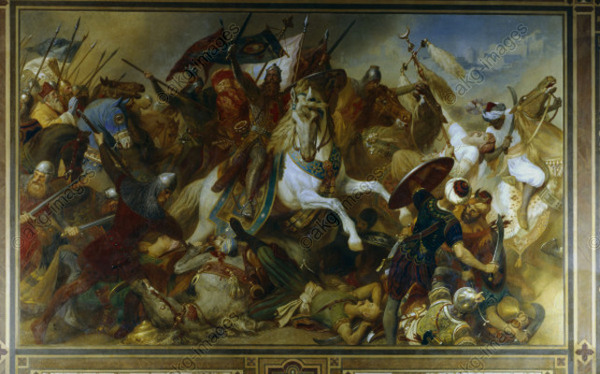
Battle at Iconium, by Hermann Wislicenus, c 1890. Prayers to Saint George here in 1190 were the battle cry of the Christian forces.

The invocation of Saint George as a protector during the Middle Ages is well exemplified by the conduct of the soldiers participating in the Battle of Iconium in 1190, during the Third Crusade. As Frederick I Barbarossa marched through Anatolia, his troops were involved in group prayer and the bishops would hold camp-wide religious rites for them to strengthen their faith and morale. Priests would celebrate special votive Masses with the troops to pray for divine support. These Masses focused on Saint George and the soldiers always invoked him for he was said to appear whenever the crusaders were in their greatest need for help. In a letter sent to his son in November 1189, Fredrick stated that despite having superb troops, it was necessary for him to place his trust in prayers for divine assistance for: "A King is saved by the Grace of the Eternal King which exceeds the merits of any individual".

Church of San Giorgio, Siena, built by donations from soldiers upon the victory at Battle of Montaperti in 1260

A few days before Pentecost, one of Fredrick's soldiers named Ludwig of Helfenstein reported that he had seen a white clad warrior, identified as Saint George, on a white horse attacking the Turks, and the chronicled accounts provide no evidence that anyone doubted him. On the evening of May 13, 1190, Frederick's troops were ordered to confess their sins and received penance. During the battle on May 14, the priests and bishops (at the risk of injury or death) went to the front, among the troops, to pray, wearing their white stoles that made them obvious targets for the Muslims. The invocation of Saint George for help had by then become the standard battle cry of the soldiers. The crusaders prevailed in the battle and captured Iconium on May 16, 1190.

Another example is provided by the Battle of Montaperti in 1260. Here, the pleas for help to Saint George and the ensuing victory led to donations by the soldiers for the construction of the Church of San Giorgio in Siena and an annual festival that grew so large that it had to be moved to a larger location. As of the twelfth and thirteenth centuries, Saint George had come to be seen as the normal defender of the crusaders, and even the standard-bearer of their army. And in a wider context, he came to be seen, and was depicted in art, as "a protector", his raised sword symbolizing both protection and sacrifice. In some medieval paintings, Saint George even came to be represented as an intercessor to Christ.

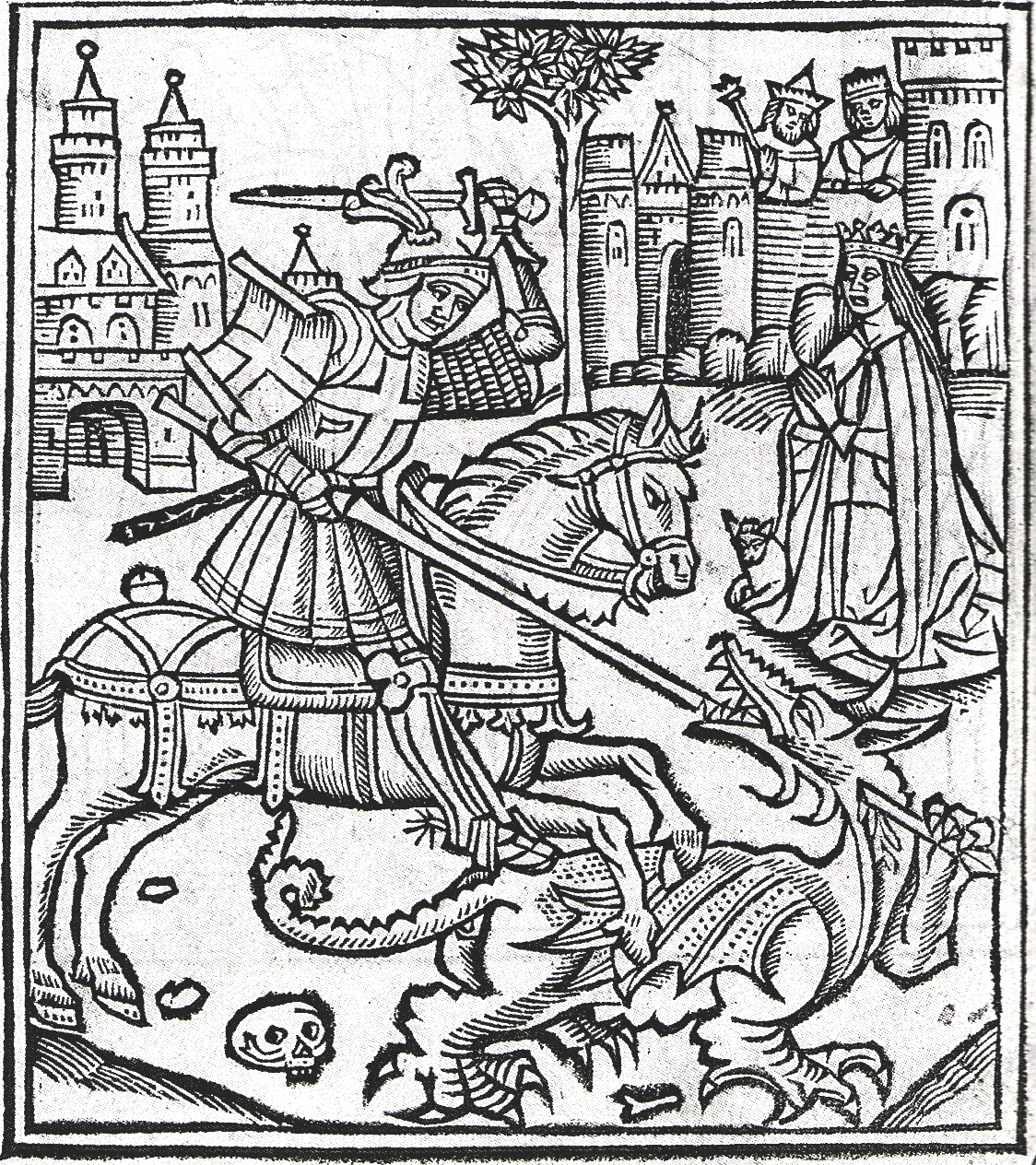
Woodcut Frontispiece from Alexander Barclay's "Lyfe of Seynt George" Westminster 1515

During the eleventh century Crusades many of the Normans under Robert Curthose, the Duke of Normandy and son of William the Conqueror, took Saint George as their patron. Pendants bearing the image of Saint George were used for protection. The inscription on an enamel pendant at the British Museum specifically asks the saint to protect the wearer in battle. Songs were composed to Saint George for the English peasantry, e.g.:

As for Saint George O'
Saint George he was a knight, O!
Of all the knights in Christendom,
Saint George is the right, O!

Early patron saints in England were Edmund the Martyr and Edward the Confessor. But when Richard the Lionheart was crusading in the Middle East in the twelfth century he had a vision of Saint George who promised him victory in the battle. Eventually Saint George was proclaimed the patron saint of England in the mid-thirteenth century and protector of the royal family by Edward III in the fourteenth century. More than 190 Medieval churches in England were dedicated to Saint George, and stained glass bearing his image could be found in many more.

English crusaders who helped in the conquest of Lisbon in the twelfth century, brought the devotion to Saint George to Portugal with them. By the fourteenth century "São Jorge" (i.e. St. George) had become the battle cry of Portuguese troops and Saint Constable attributed their victory in the Battle of Aljubarrota to Saint George. King John I of Portugal was specially devoted to the saint and declared him the patron saint of Portugal. In the fifteenth and sixteenth centuries, Portuguese explorers carried the devotion across the oceans to India and South America.

== Tales and legends ==
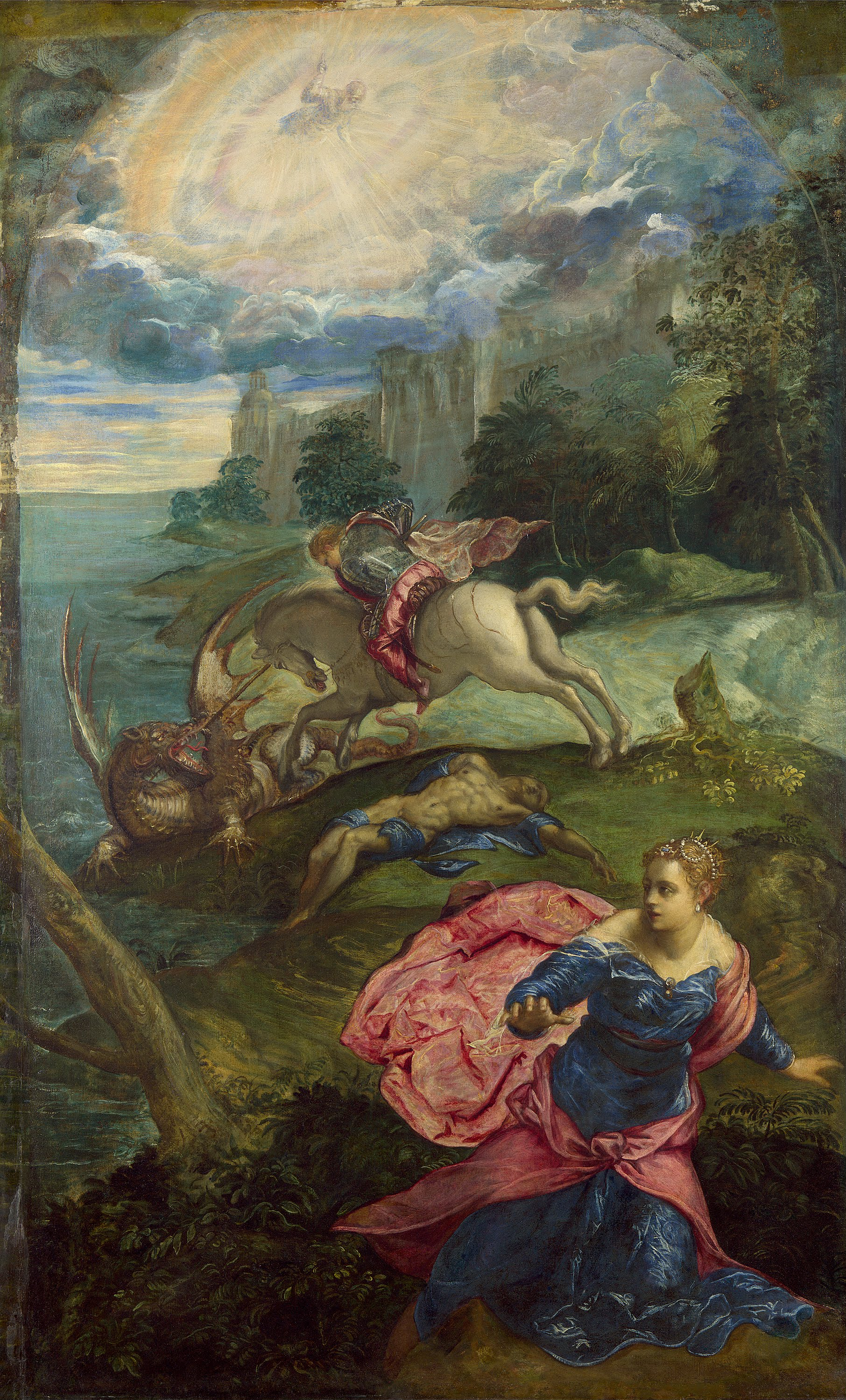
St. George and the Dragon, by Tintoretto, 1560, National Gallery

After the thirteenth century, a large portion of the art, iconography and legendary traditions associated with Saint George and many festivals that celebrate him involve the legend of Saint George and the Dragon.

The association of Saint George with the dragon was not attested to until the twelfth century version of Miracula Sancti Georgii (Codex Romanus Angelicus 46, pt. 12, written in Greek). Jacobus de Voragine, the thirteenth-century archbishop of Genoa, helped promote the legend of the dragon with his publication of The Golden Legend around 1260. By the fourteenth century the Golden legend had become one of the most popular religious works of the Middle Ages and helped spread the legend of the dragon. In De Voragine's version of the legend, the dragon was in the city of Silena in the province of Libya in the Middle East. However, as the tales were carried across Europe, the location of the dragon varied. For instance in some German versions the dragon would come to the area above the village of Ebingen and would disappear into the southern slope of Schonberg mountain in Liechtenstein. In these legends, Saint George slays a dragon to liberate a princess and is thanked by the town people.

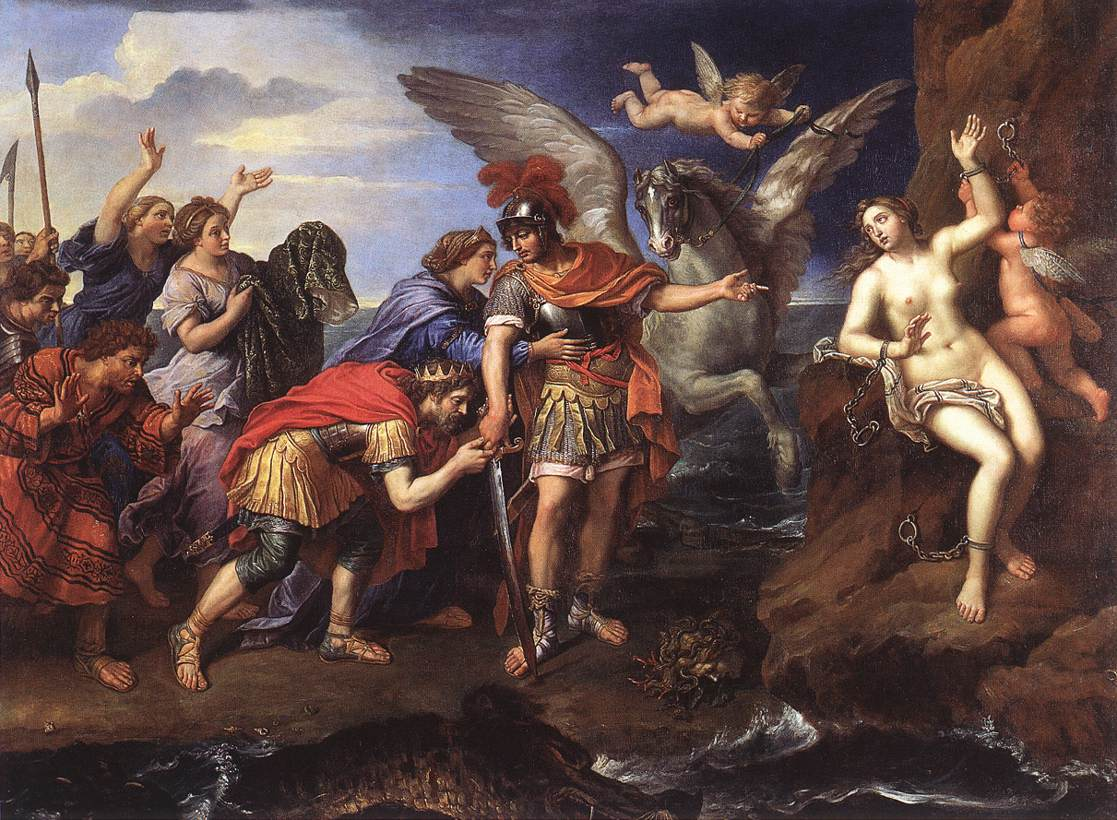
Perseus frees Andromeda from a marine monster, by Pierre Mignard, Louvre, 1679

Some authors have pointed out that many scenes of the legend of Saint George's slaying of the dragon to save the princess correspond to the myth of the slaying of the "sea monster" by Perseus to free Andromeda in Greek mythology. And that the Andromeda episode in the life of Perseus may have helped shape the legend of Saint George and the dragon. The similarities extend to the visual representations, and many artistic portrayals of Saint George slaying the dragon have distinct counterparts in the renderings of Perseus and Andromeda.

In Russia, the story of Saint George and the Dragon passed through the oral tradition of religious poems (dukhovny stikhi) sung by minstrels and fused the story of the martyrdom of the saint with the Western legend of the liberation of the princess from the dragon.

Images of the life and martyrdom of Saint George and the dragon legend began to appear in churches across Europe, including Sweden, where Saint George was portrayed as the hero and example of all noble young men who needed to be stimulated to show their virtue and bravery in the defense of princesses and in confession of the true belief. The Swedish regent Sten Sture the Elder attributed his victory over King Christian I of Denmark in the 1471 Battle of Brunkeberg to the intercession of Saint George, and in the aftermath commissioned a statue of Saint George and the Dragon carved by the Lübeck sculptor Bernt Notke for the Storkyrkan church in Stockholm, as an obvious allegory of Sture's battle against Christian.

Saint George thus came to be seen as the deliverer of prisoners and protector of the poor, and these sentiments are reflected in art that depicts him. Saint George the Victorious striking down the dragon became one of the most popular subjects in Orthodox icon painting.

== Worldwide devotions and statues ==
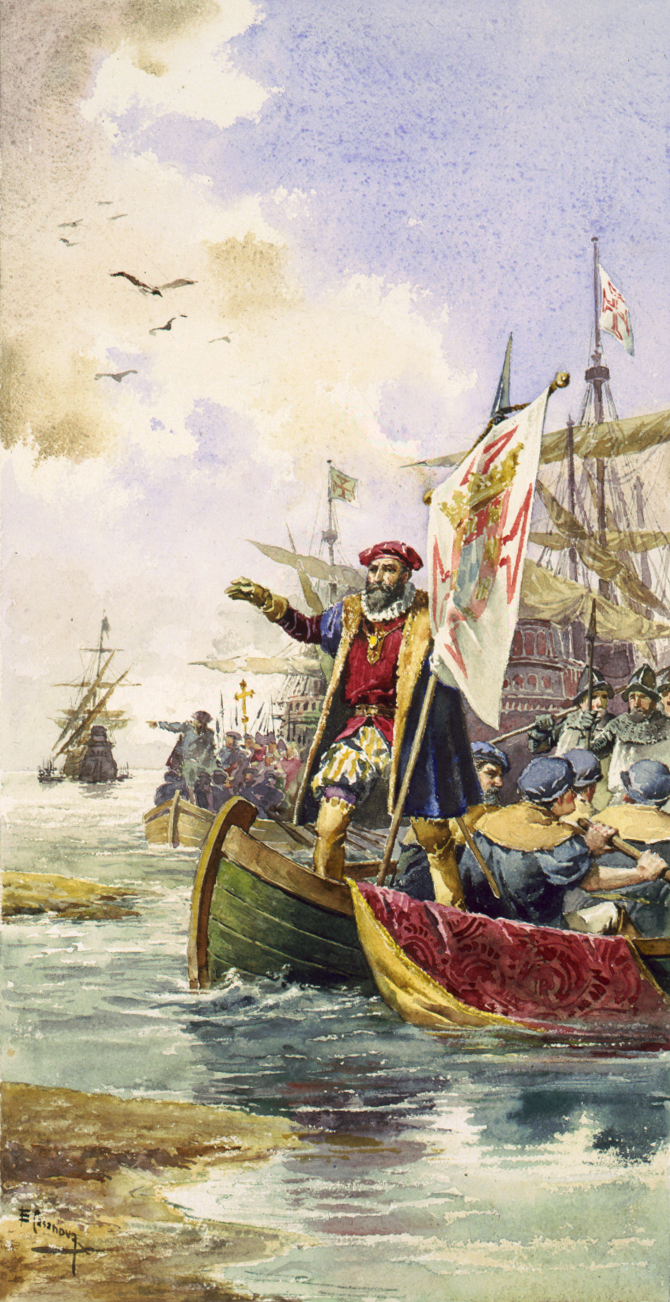
Depiction of 15th-century Portuguese explorer Vasco da Gamma landing in India, c. 1880

By the fifteenth century, the story of the courage of Saint George, and devotions to him, had spread across the world, from the southern parts of India to the northern parts of Russia. Syriac Christians (who arrived first) and the Portuguese brought the legend of the pious and brave Saint George to Kerala in Southern India and statues to honor him were erected. However, before the fifteenth century arrival of the Portuguese, the Syrians had no tradition of sacred statues as they believed them to be idolatrous. In Indian churches such as St. George's Church, Aruvithura, near Kottayam in Kerala, the annual feast is dedicated to St. George, the patron saint of the church, and his ancient statue is still honored. The arrival of the English after the Portuguese, added to the spread of devotions to the saint. Elsewhere in Kerala, the annual ten-day prayer feast at the massive 19th century St. George's Church in Edathua (which resembles the Medieval churches of Europe) attracts many pilgrims.

Impressive Saint George statues began to appear across Europe after the fourteenth century. Donatello's 1415 bronze statue of Saint George in Florence, Italy, is considered a masterpiece of Florentine art. In Stockholm Cathedral, an exceptionally lifelike monumental wooden statue of Saint George was erected by the fifteenth century Lübeck carver Bernt Notke, an exact copy of which can be found in his hometown in the St. Catherine Church.

The coat of arms of Moscow with Saint George

Saint George first appeared as the patron saint of Russia in 1415 and his popularity in Russia continued to grow. He grew to be so popular in Moscow that 41 churches there were dedicated to him. He is still represented on the coat of arms of the city of Moscow as a knight on a white horse slaying a dragon with a spear. Today, a large number of statues of Saint George can be found in Moscow.

The fifteenth century also witnessed a significant amount of growth in the festivals and patronages for Saint George. As of 1411, San Giorgio's festival on April 24 was a main event in Ferrara, Italy, where he is still the patron saint of the town. Such festivals spread across Europe and became part of local traditions in villages from Turtman, Valais, in Switzerland to Traunstein in Bavaria, Germany.

By the late fifteenth century, as Portuguese ships sailed the seas, symbols of Saint George began to appear in new territories, with Diogo Cão placing a pillar dedicated to the saint at the opening of the River Congo in 1484. In the sixteenth century the Portuguese spread devotions to Saint George in South America, and today the saint remains popular in places such as Brazil.

In 1620, as the ship Mayflower sailed from England to what would later become the United States, it flew the flag of Saint George, the patron saint of England. Over the next three centuries, pilgrims from Europe brought with them devotions to Saint George, and a large number churches were dedicated to him in the United States. Among them is St. George's United Methodist Church in Philadelphia, which dates to 1784 and is the oldest Methodist church still in use in the United States. To date, St. George, Staten Island, commemorates the story of Saint George and the Dragon every April.

Devotions and churches dedicated to Saint George continued to spread to other continents. St. George's Cathedral, Perth, Australia, dates to 1888, St. George's Cathedral, Cape Town, South Africa, to 1901 and Saint George's Church, Singapore, to 1910.

Due to the Christian influence on Druze faith, two Christian saints become the Druze's favorite venerated figures: Saint George and Saint Elijah. Thus, in all the villages inhabited by Druzes and Christians in central Mount Lebanon a Christian church or Druze maqam is dedicated to either one of them. According to scholar Ray Jabre Mouawad the Druzes appreciated the two saints for their bravery: Saint George because he confronted the dragon and Saint Elijah because he competed with the pagan priests of Baal and won over them. In both cases the explanations provided by Christians is that Druzes were attracted to warrior saints that resemble their own militarized society.

The reverence for Saint George, who is often identified with Al-Khidr, is deeply integrated into various aspects of Druze culture and religious practices. He is seen as a guardian of the Druze community and a symbol of their enduring faith and resilience. Additionally, Saint George is regarded as a protector and healer in Druze tradition. The story of Saint George slaying the dragon is interpreted allegorically, representing the triumph of good over evil and the protection of the faithful from harm.

== Prayers and novenas ==
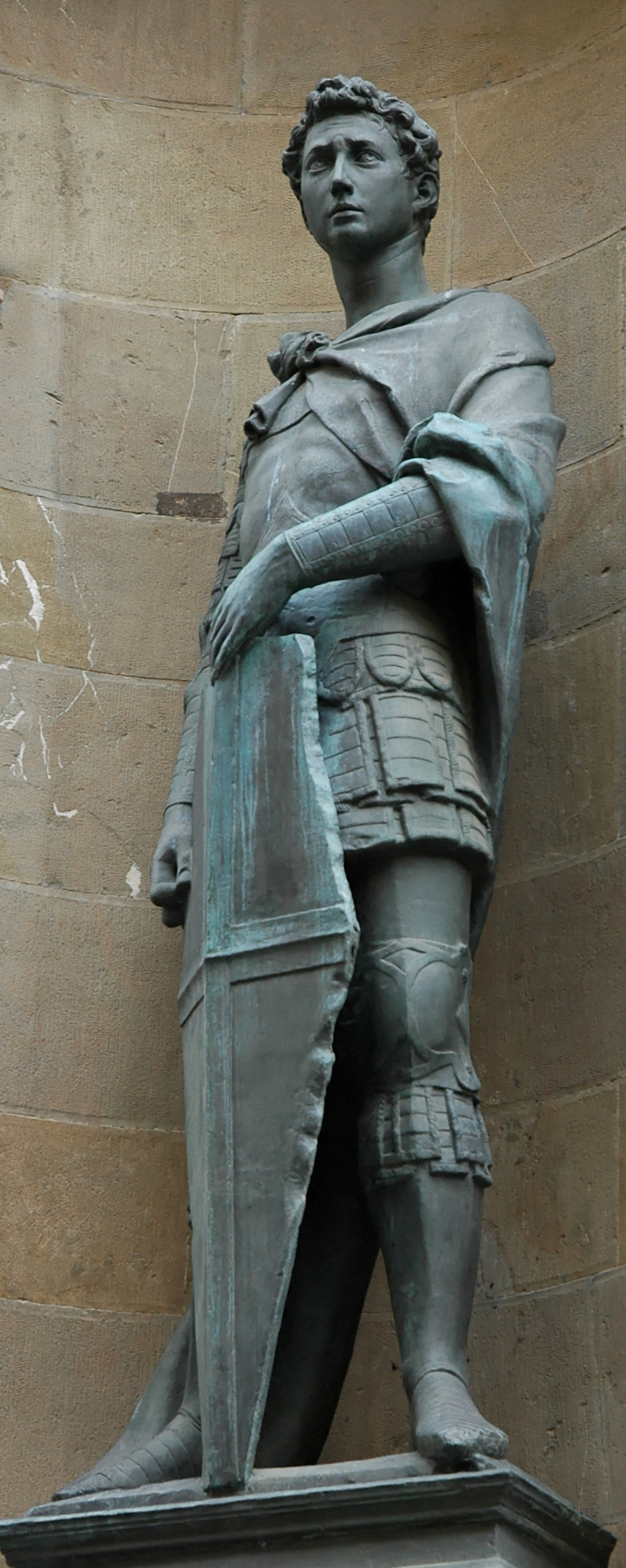
Saint George by Donatello, 1415, Florence

Along with the construction of churches, creation of art and spread of legends, a number of genuine devotions and prayers to Saint George developed over the ages among Christians. These traditions and prayers continue across the world to date, e.g. in May 2008 the arch-priest of St George's Basilica, Victoria, called on all parishioners to pray to Saint George every day. St. Mary's Orthodox Cathedral, New Delhi, India, holds prayers of intercession to Saint George every week.

The Prayer to Saint George directly refers to the courage it took for the saint to confess his Christianity before opposing authority:

Almighty God, who gave to your servant George boldness to Confess the Name of our Savior Jesus Christ before the rulers of this world, and courage to die for this faith: Grant that we may always be ready to give a reason for the hope that is in us, and to suffer gladly for the sake of our Lord Jesus Christ; who lives and reigns with you and the Holy Spirit, one God, for ever and ever.

The same sentiment is present within the following two Prayers to Saint George:

St. George, Heroic Catholic soldier and defender of your Faith, you dared to criticize a tyrannical Emperor and were subjected to horrible torture. You could have occupied a high military position but you preferred to die for your Lord. Obtain for us the great grace of heroic Christian courage that should mark soldiers of Christ. Amen.

There is also a Prayers of Intercession to Saint George:

Faithful servant of God and invincible martyr, Saint George; favored by God with the gift of faith, and inflamed with an ardent love of Christ, thou didst fight valiantly against the dragon of pride, falsehood, and deceit. Neither pain nor torture, sword nor death could part thee from the love of Christ. I fervently implore thee for the sake of this love to help me by thy intercession to overcome the temptations that surround me, and to bear bravely the trials that oppress me, so that I may patiently carry the cross which is placed upon me; and let neither distress nor difficulties separate me from the love of Our Lord Jesus Christ. Valiant champion of the Faith, assist me in the combat against evil, that I may win the crown promised to them that persevere unto the end.

And:

O GOD, who didst grant to Saint George strength and constancy in the various torments which he sustained for our holy faith; we beseech Thee to preserve, through his intercession, our faith from wavering and doubt, so that we may serve Thee with a sincere heart faithfully unto death. Through Christ our Lord. Amen.

The Novena to Saint George does not have a specific warrior context, but simply asks God for divine assistance and the imitation of the life of the saint:

Almighty and eternal God! With lively faith and reverently worshiping Thy divine Majesty, I prostrate myself before Thee and invoke with filial trust Thy supreme bounty and mercy. Illumine the darkness of my intellect with a ray of Thy heavenly light and inflame my heart with the fire of Thy divine love that I may contemplate the great virtues and merits of the Saint in whose honor I make this novena, and following his example imitate, like him, the life of Thy Divine Son.

== Gallery of art and architecture ==
=== Paintings and statues ===
==== Paintings ====
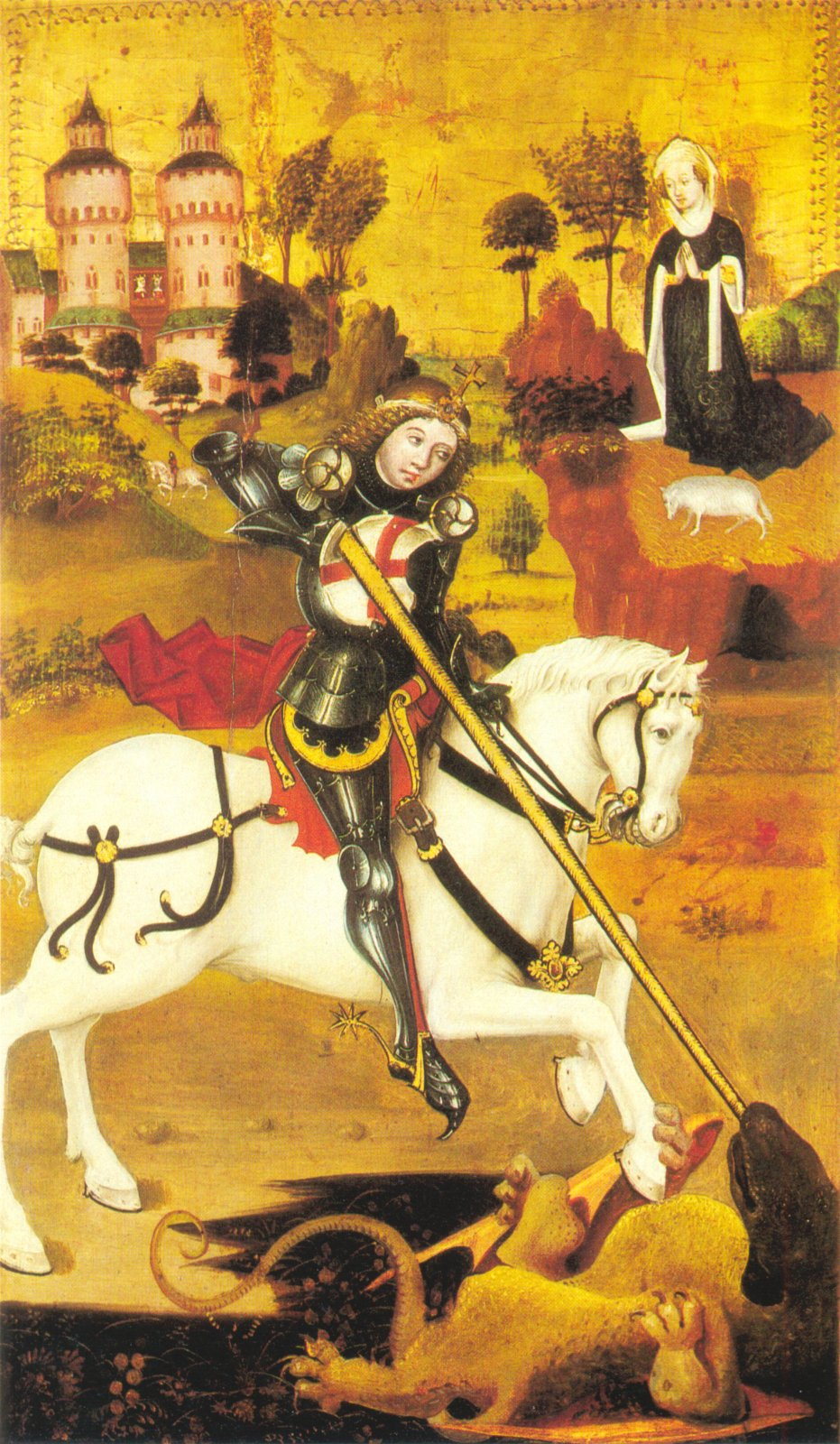
German Altarpiece panel, 1470

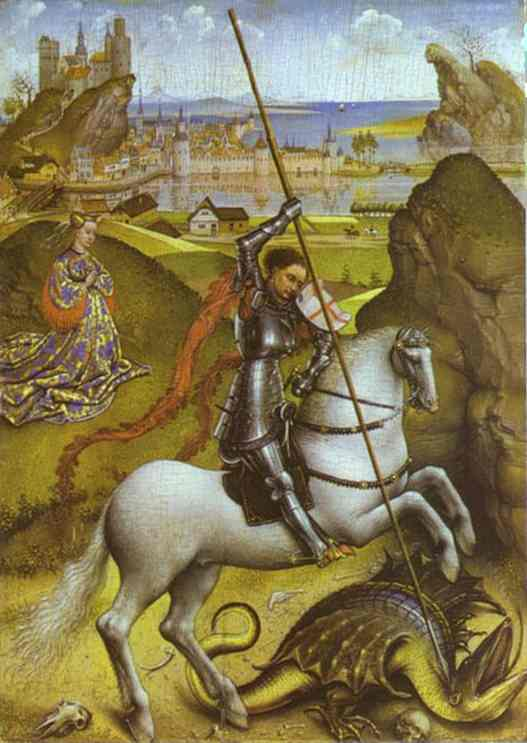
Rogier van der Weyden, 15th century

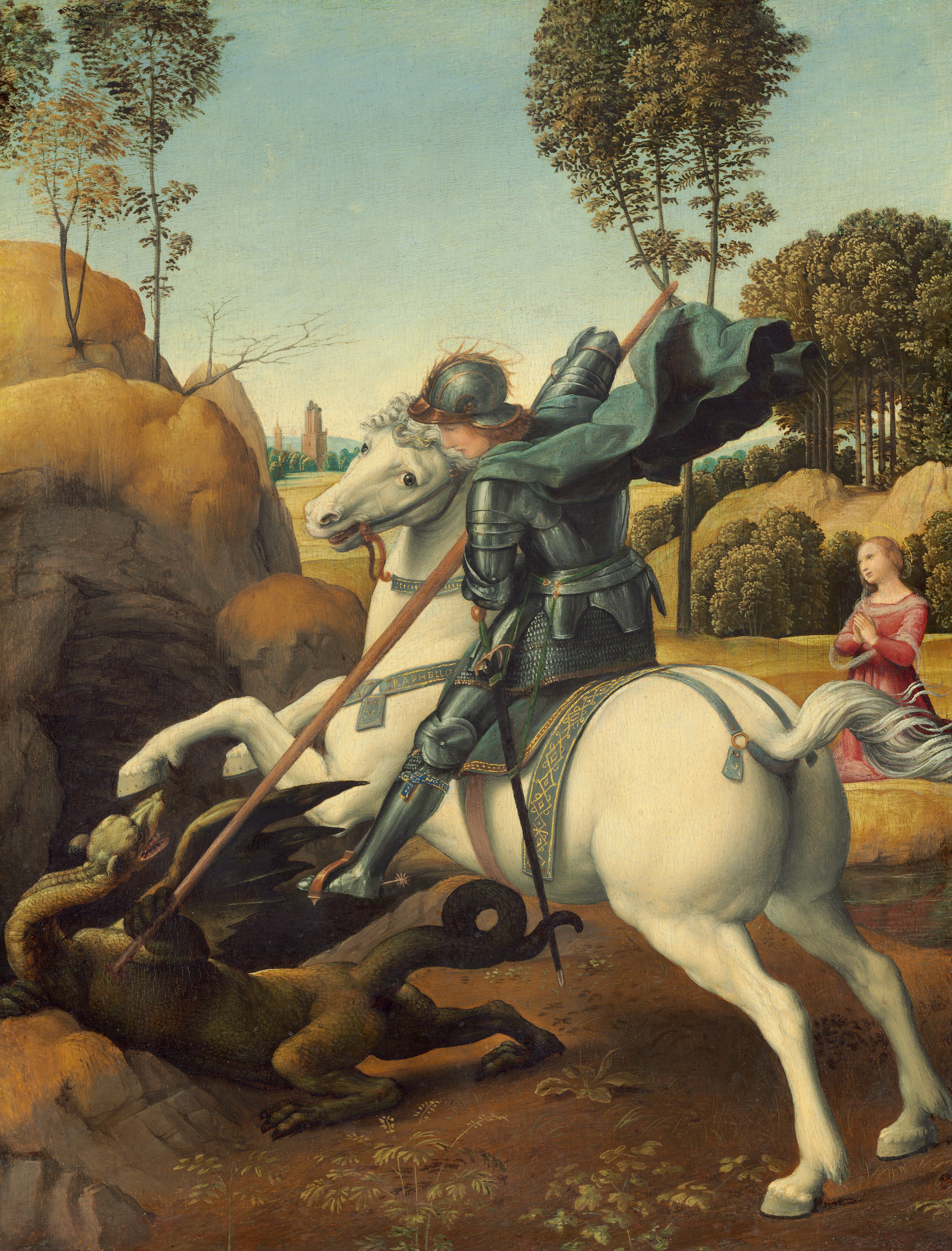
Raphael, 1505-1506

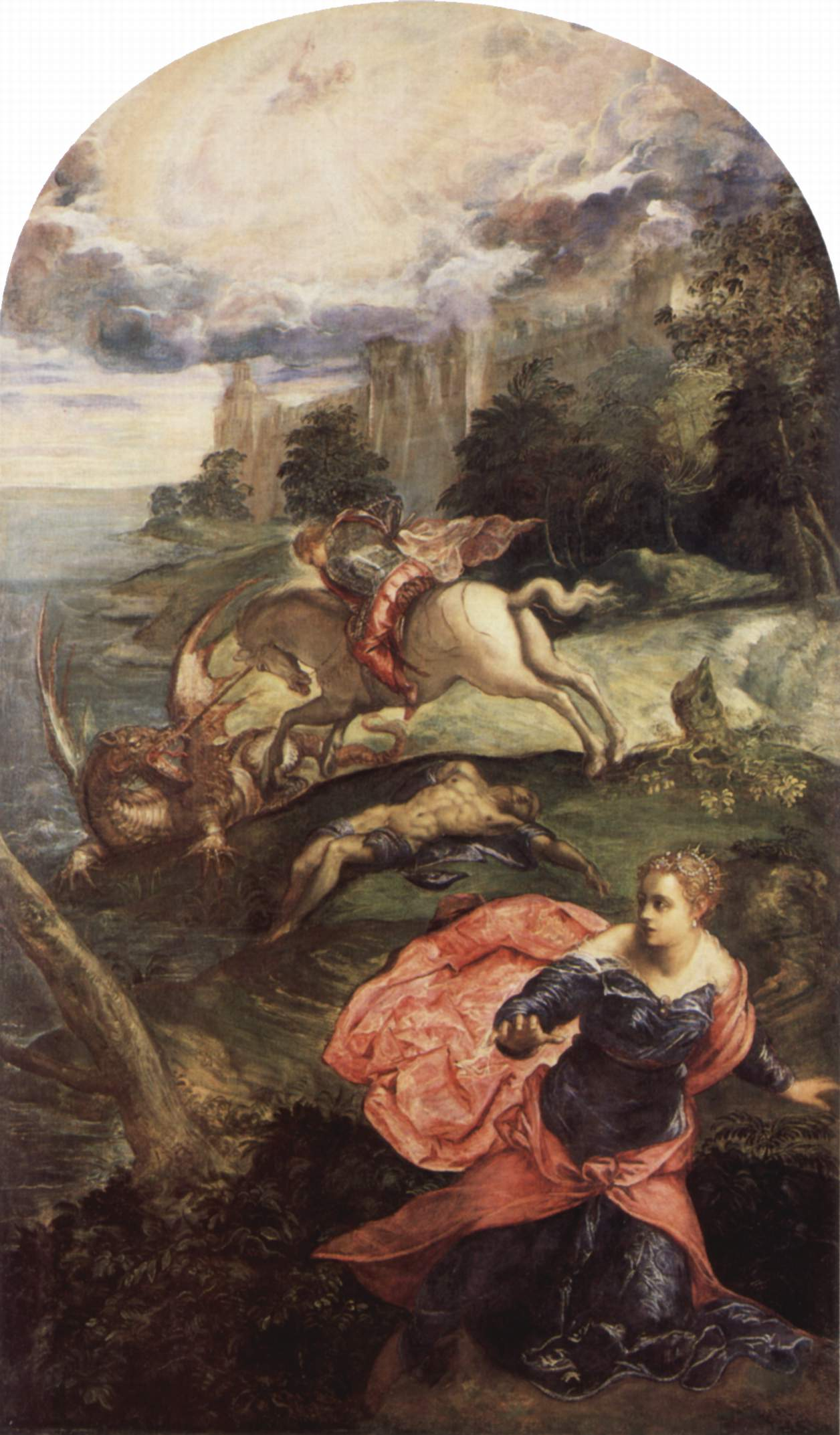
Tintoretto, 16th century

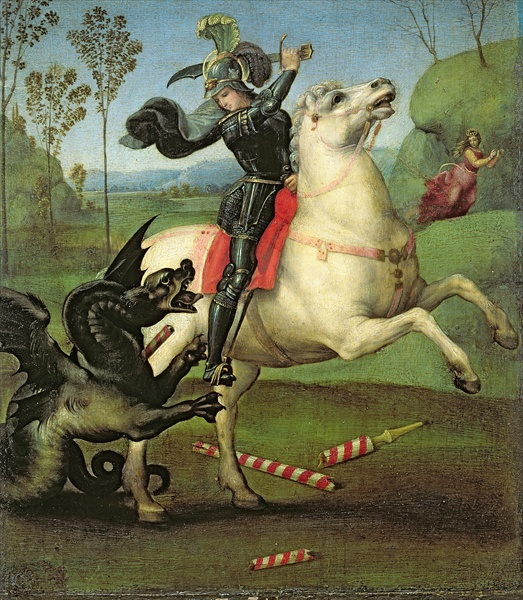
Raphael 16th century

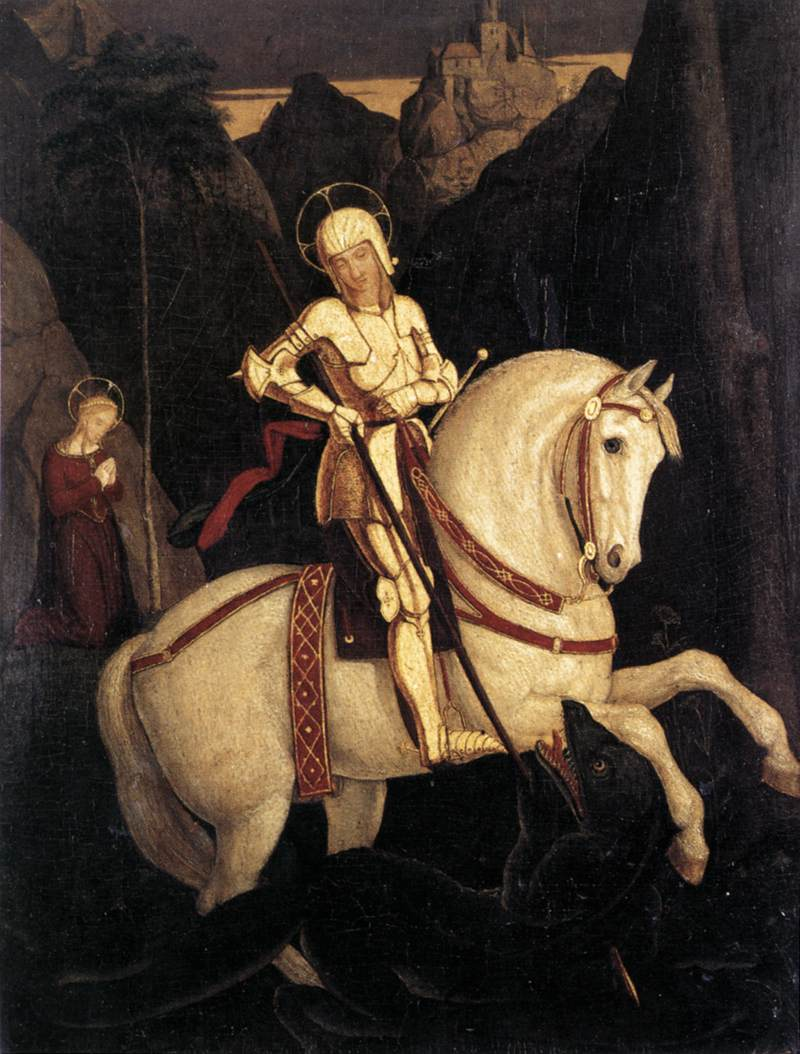
Franz Pforr, 1811

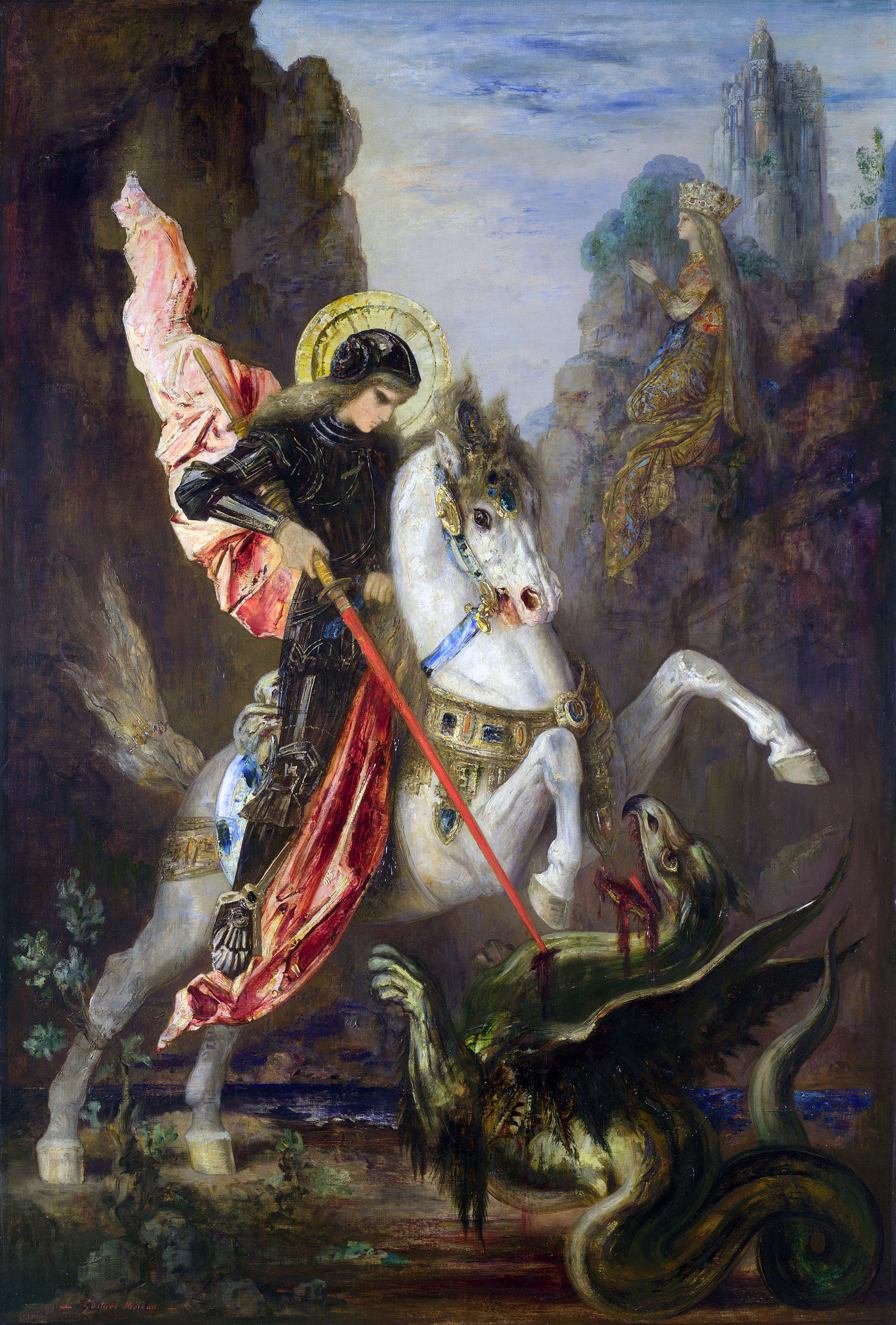
Gustave Moreau, mid-late 19th century

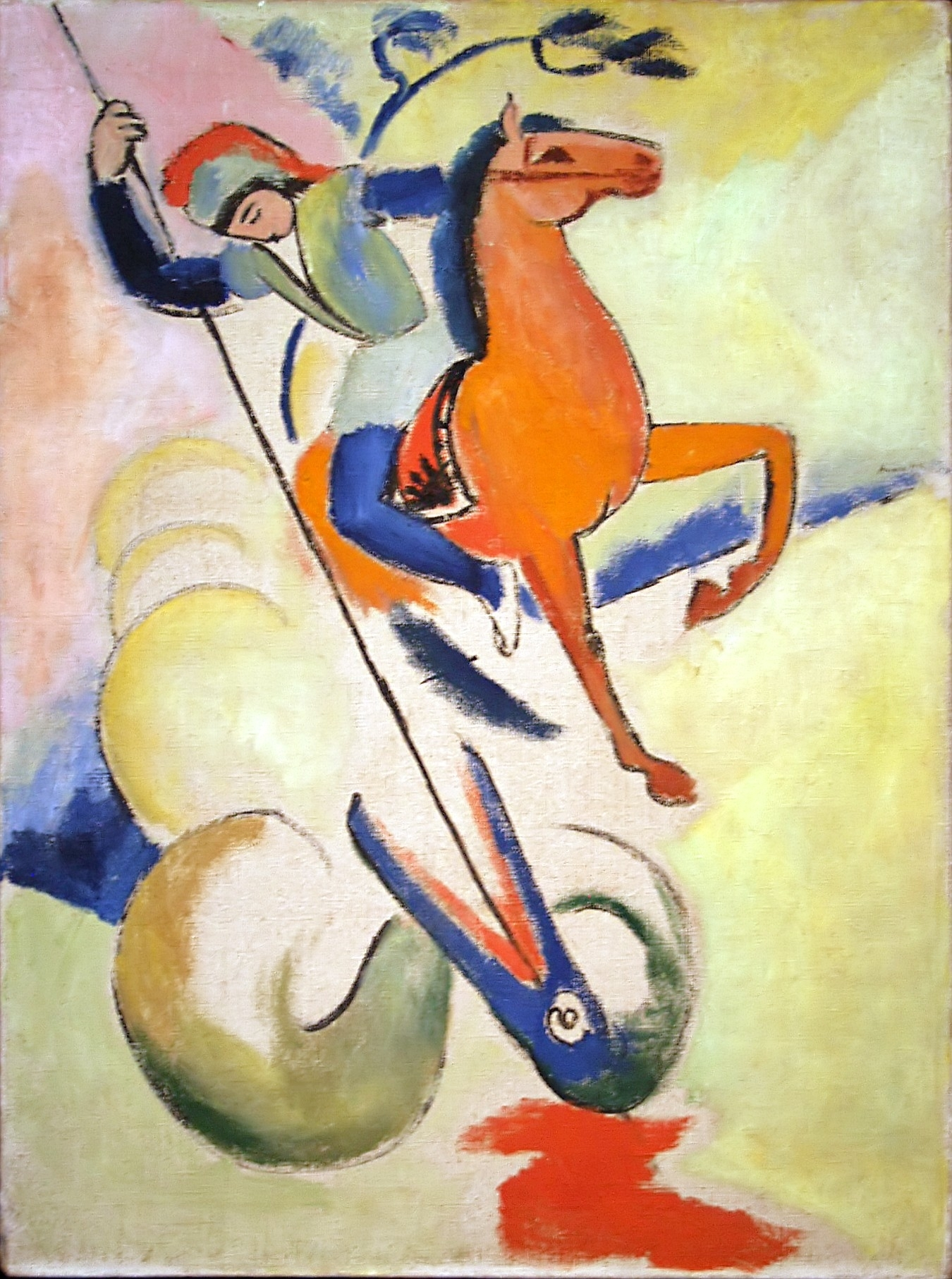
August Macke, 1912
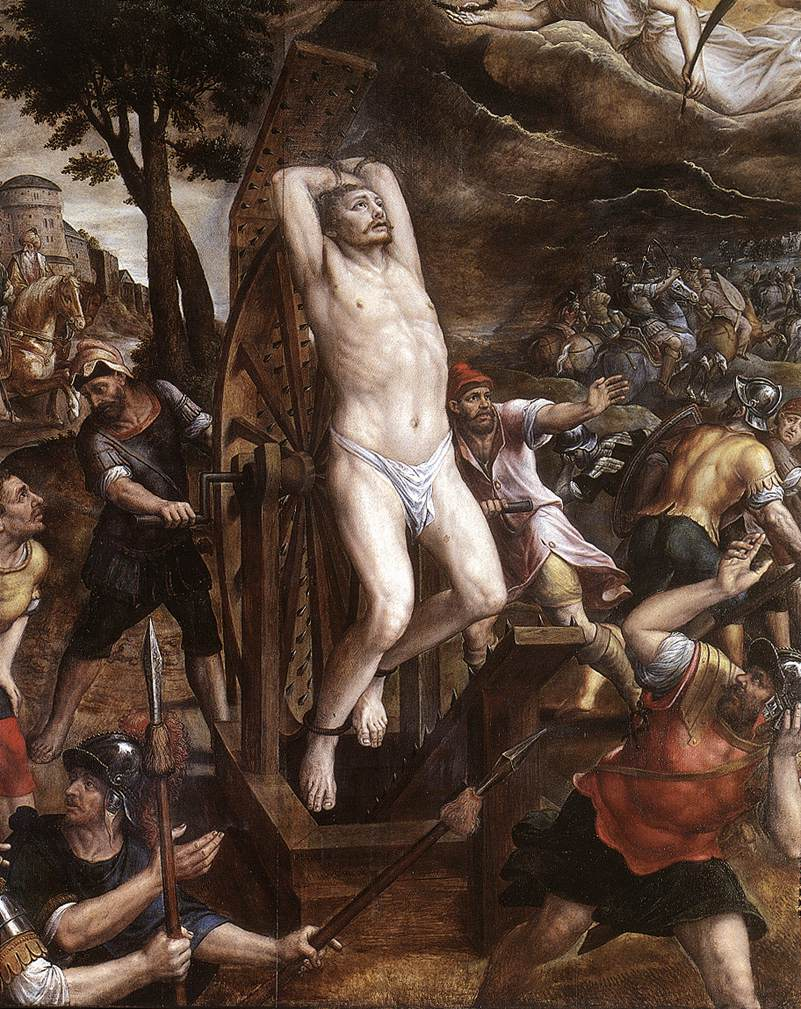
The Torture of St. George, Michael Coxcie, c. 1580

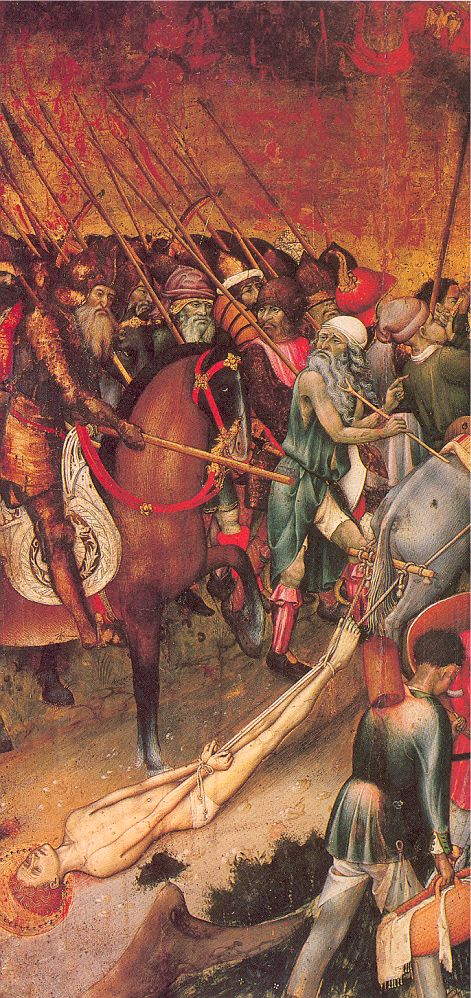
St. George Dragged by Horses, by Bernardo Martorell, 15th century

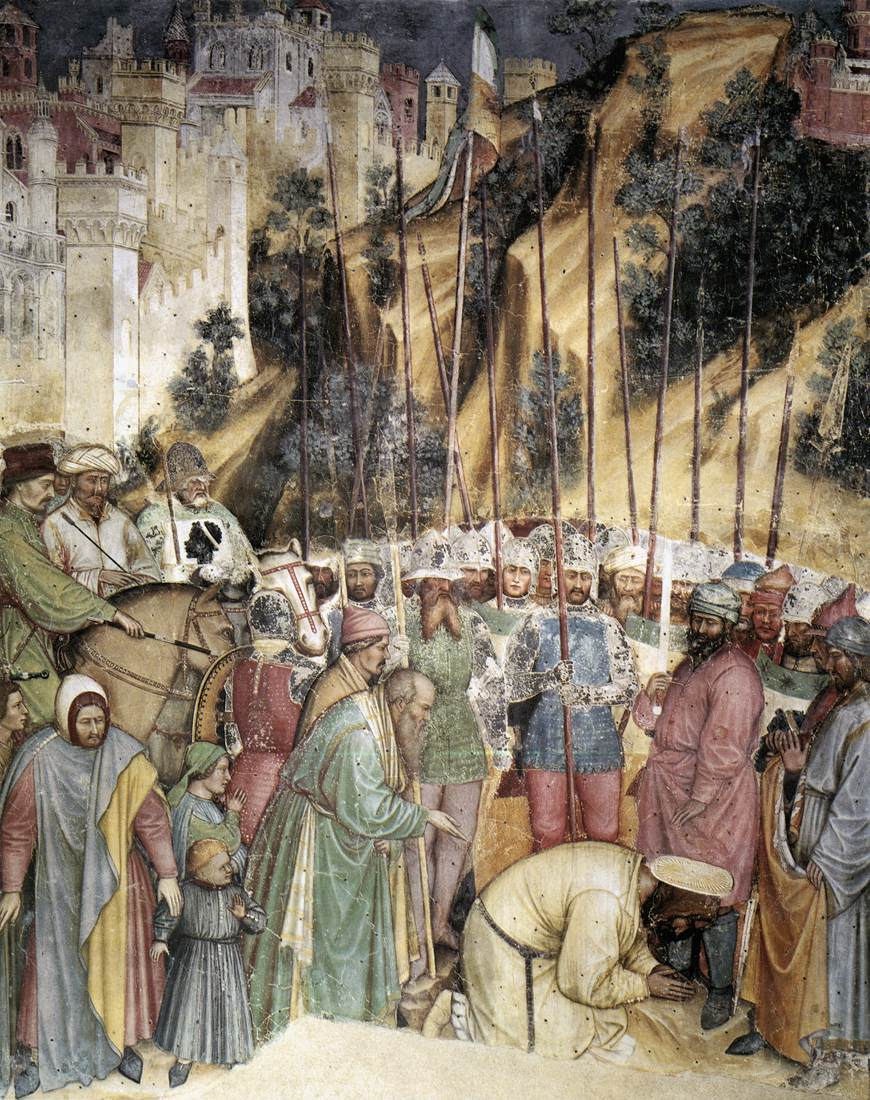
The Beheading of St. George, St. George's Oratory, Padua, Italy

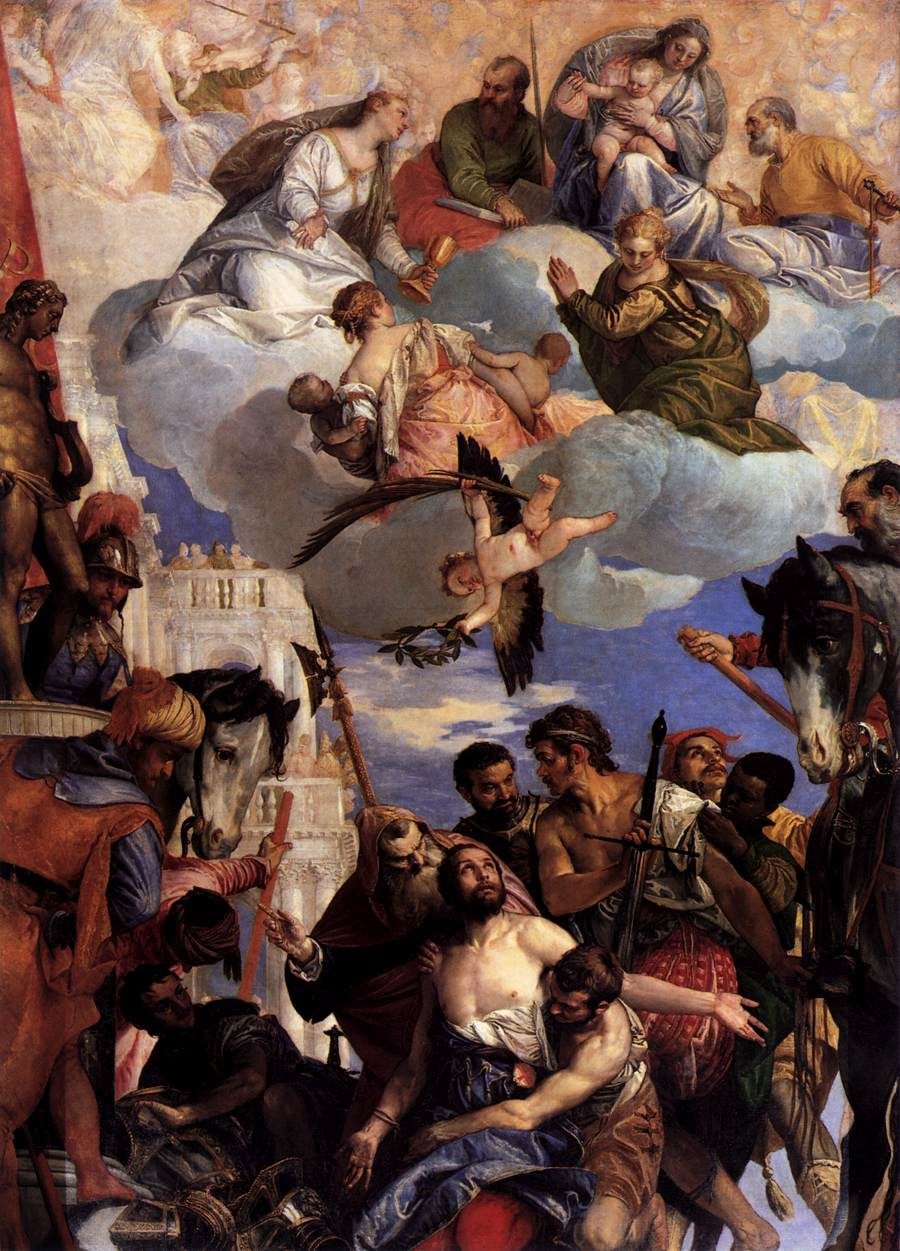
The Martyrdom of St. George, by Paolo Veronese, 1564.

==== Icons ====
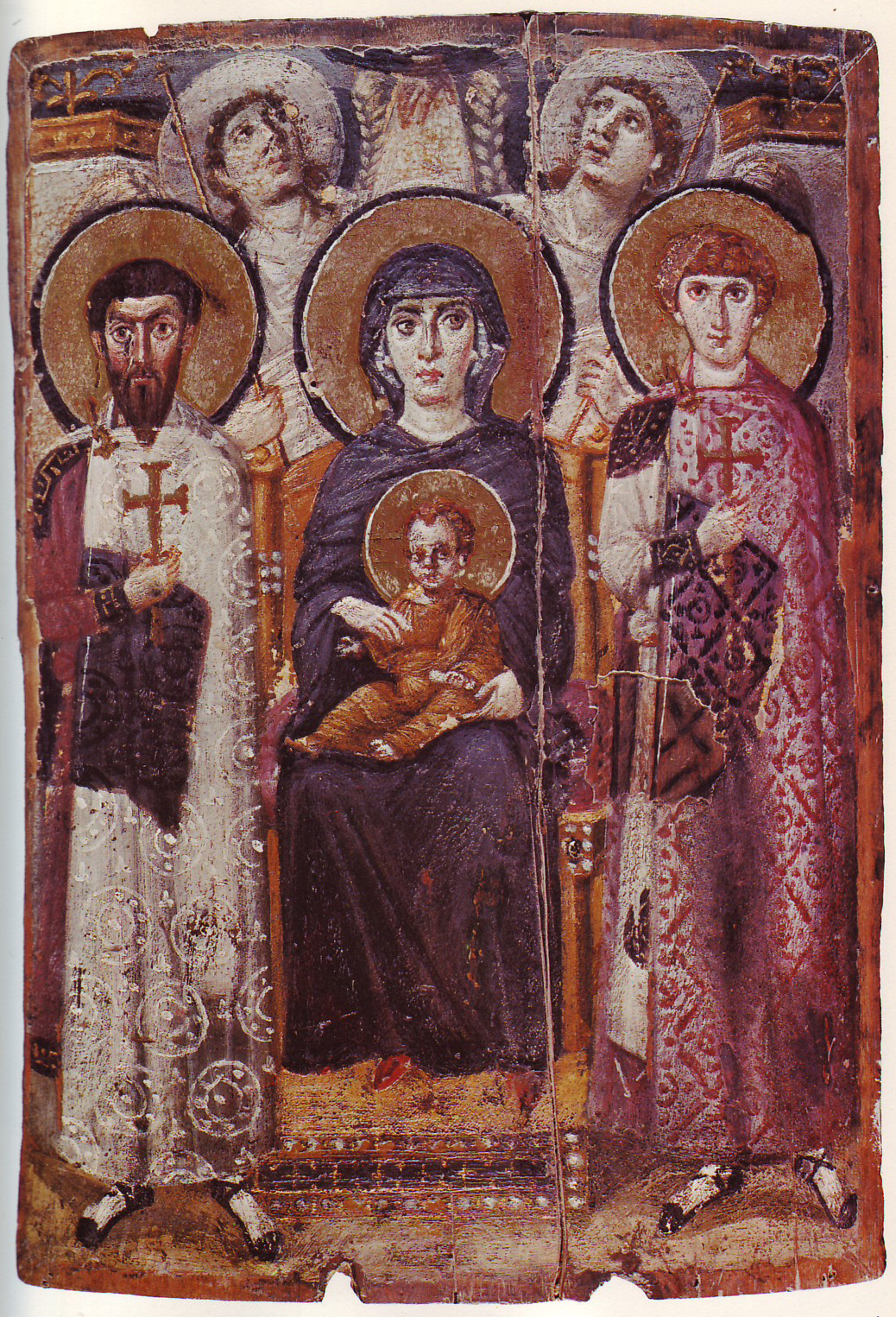
St. George with the Virgin Mary and Child, St. Theodore and angels, late 6th century

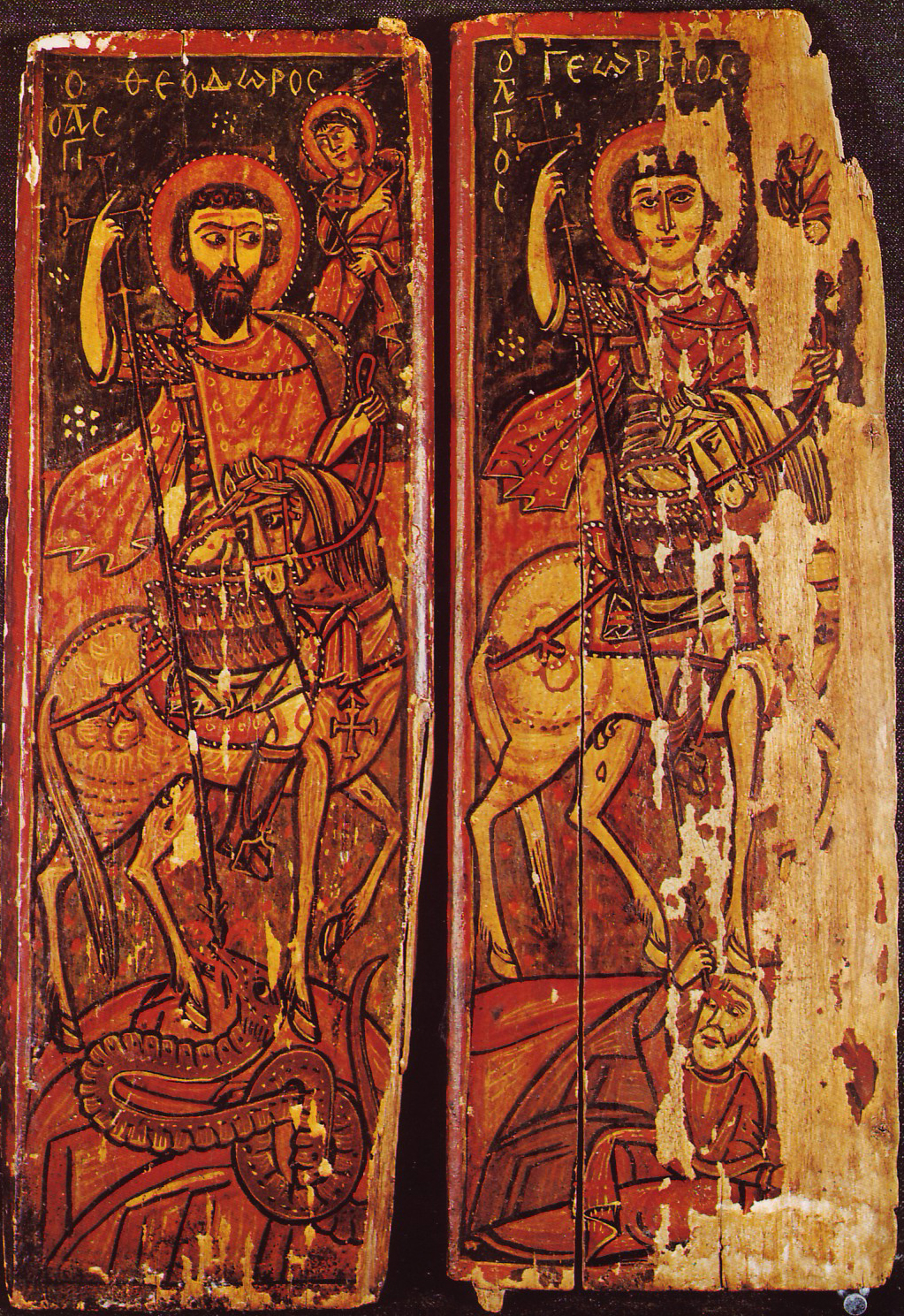
Conquering Saints George and Theodore on horses, Saint Catherine's Monastery, 9th or 10th century

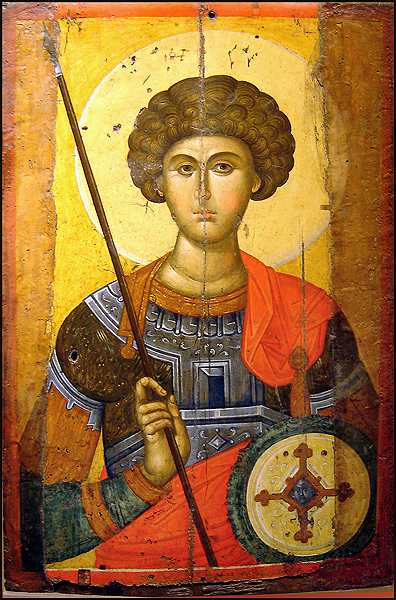
Byzantine icon of St. George, Athens Greece

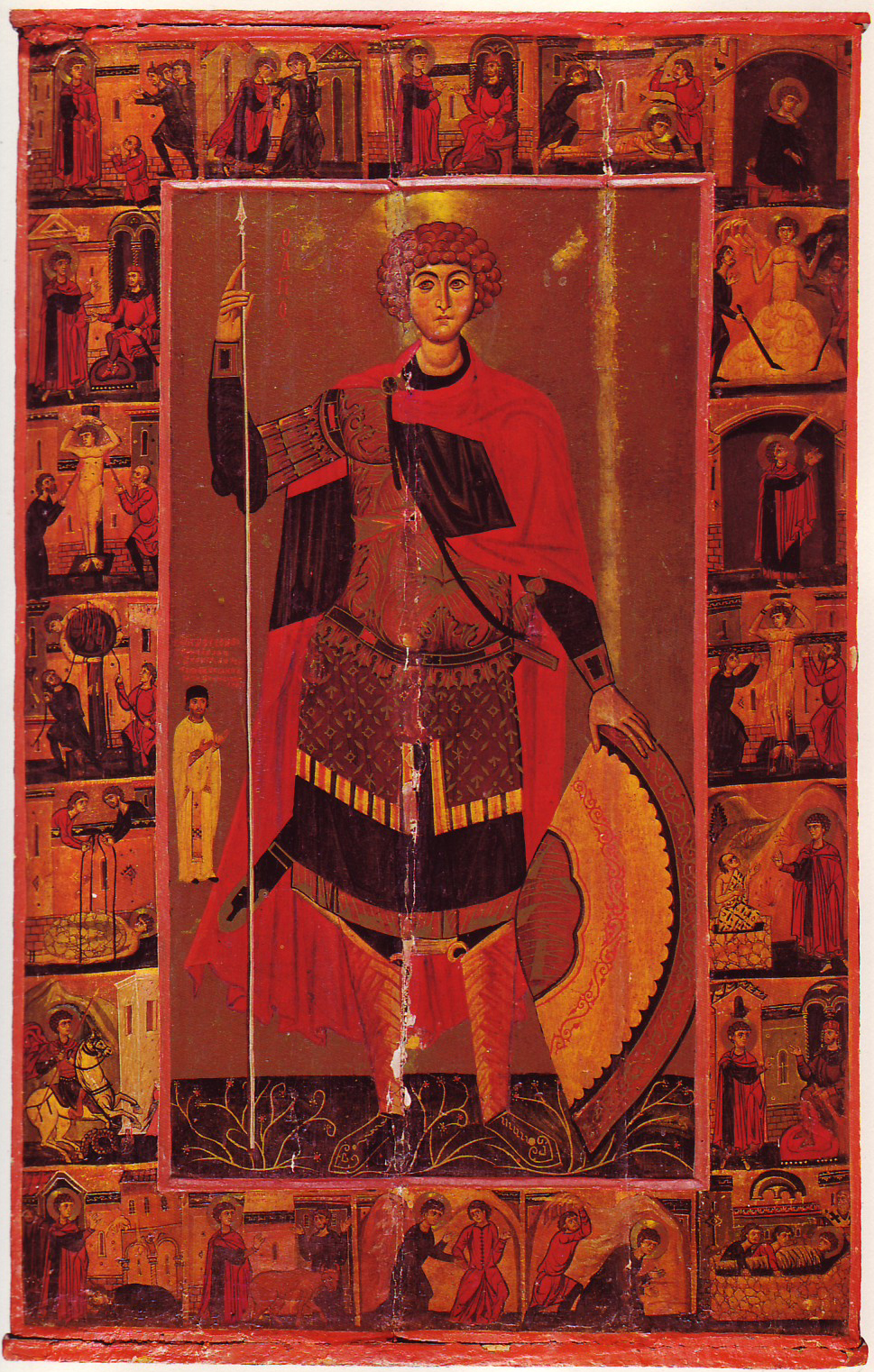
St. George and scenes of his life. Saint Catherine's Monastery, 13th century.
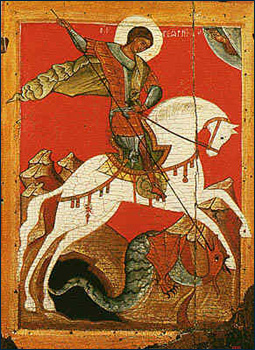
Russian icon, 15th century

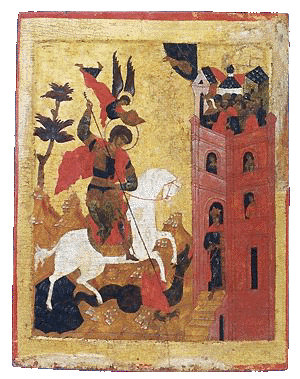
16th-century Russian icon

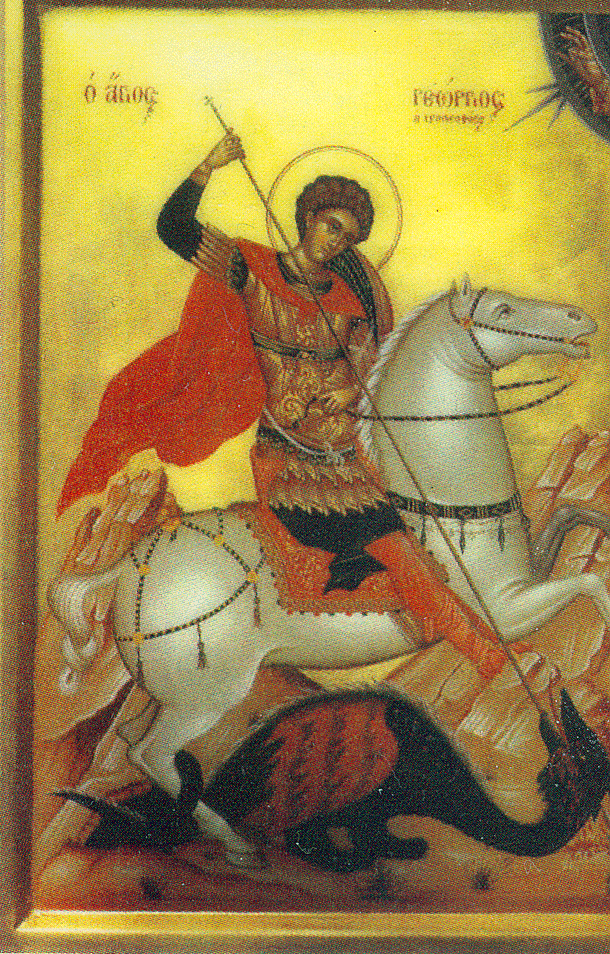
Byzantine Greek icon

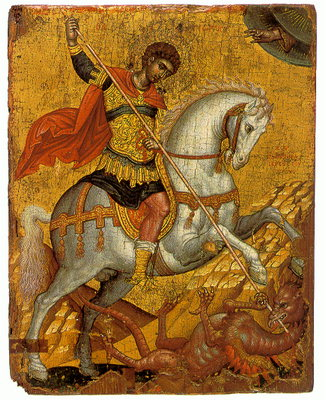
17th-century Greek icon

==== Statues ====
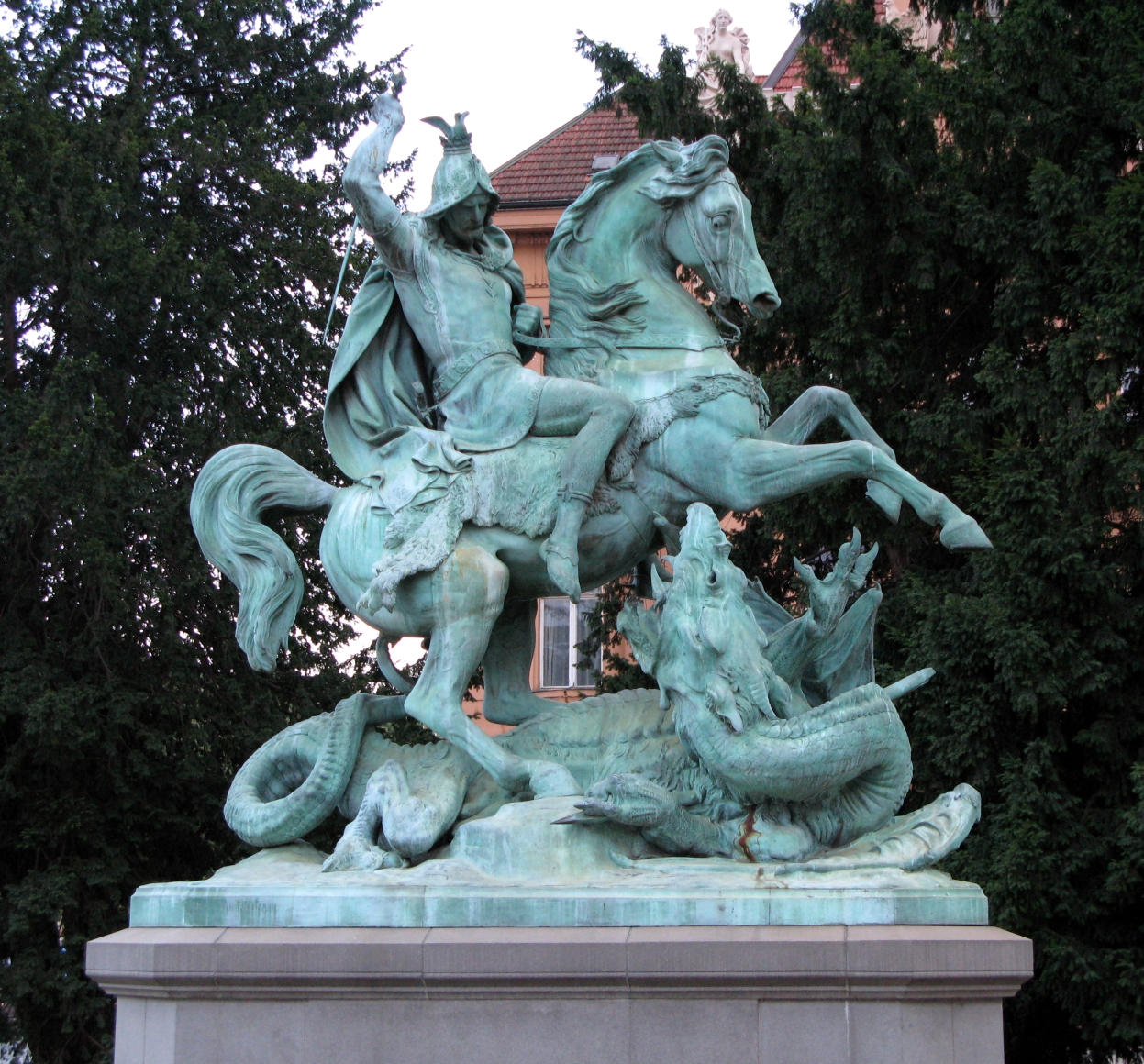
Zagreb

Berlin

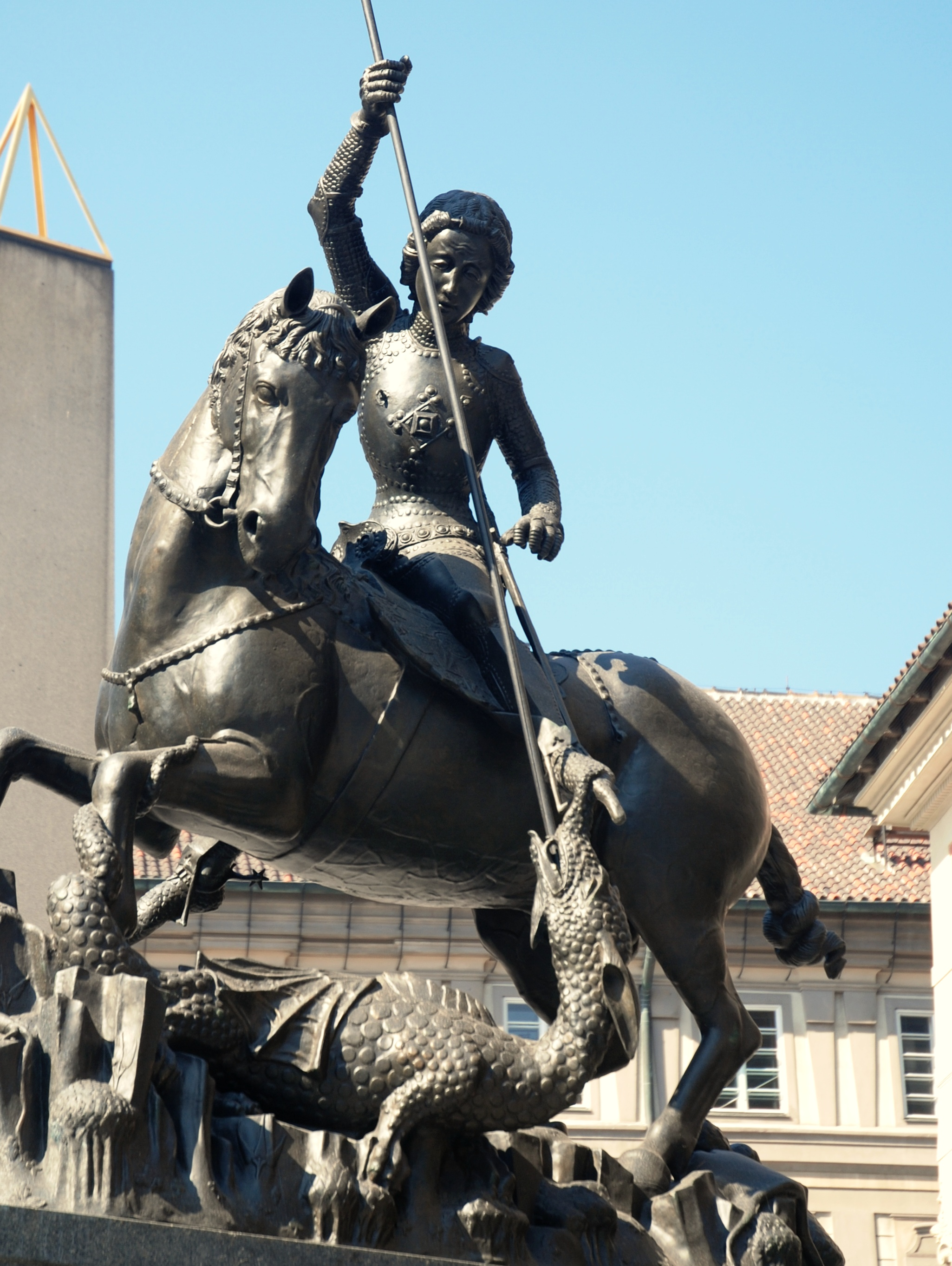
Prague

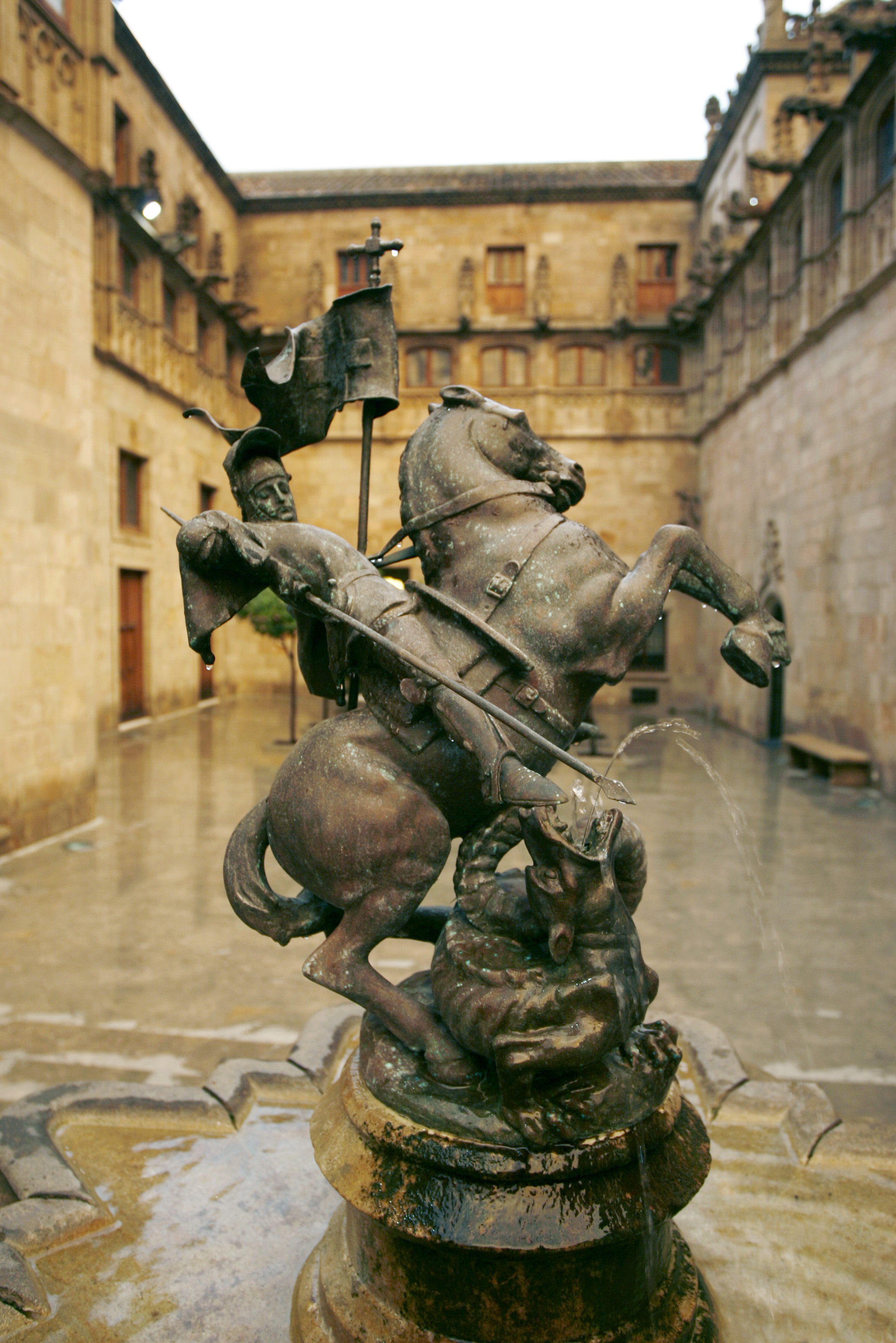
Barcelona

=== Churches and altars ===
==== Churches ====
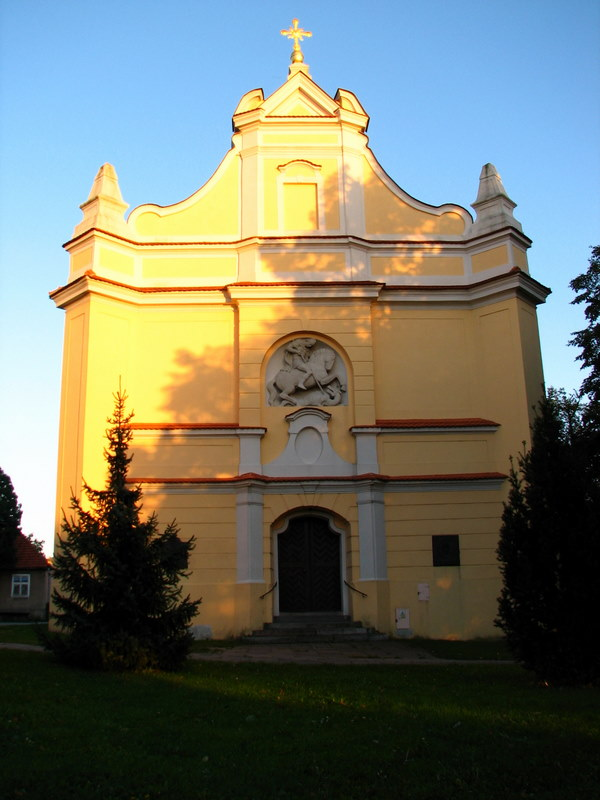
St. George's Church, Gniezno, Poland (Roman Catholic)

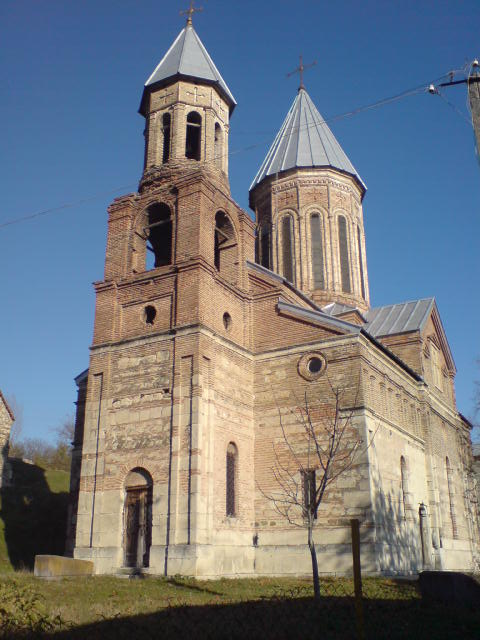
St. George's Church, Surami, Republic of Georgia (Orthodox)

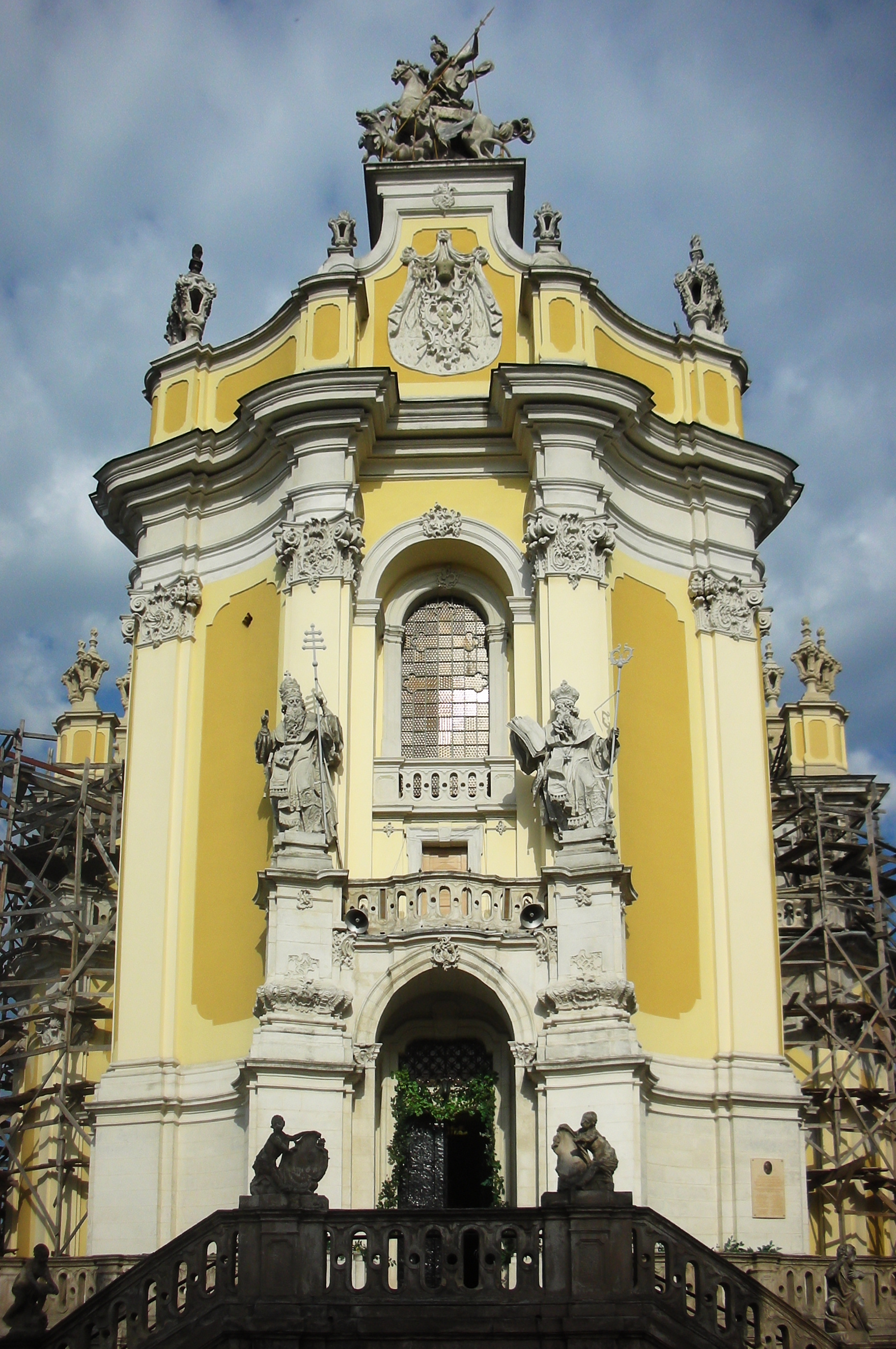
St. George's Cathedral, Lviv, Ukraine (Catholic Eastern Rite)

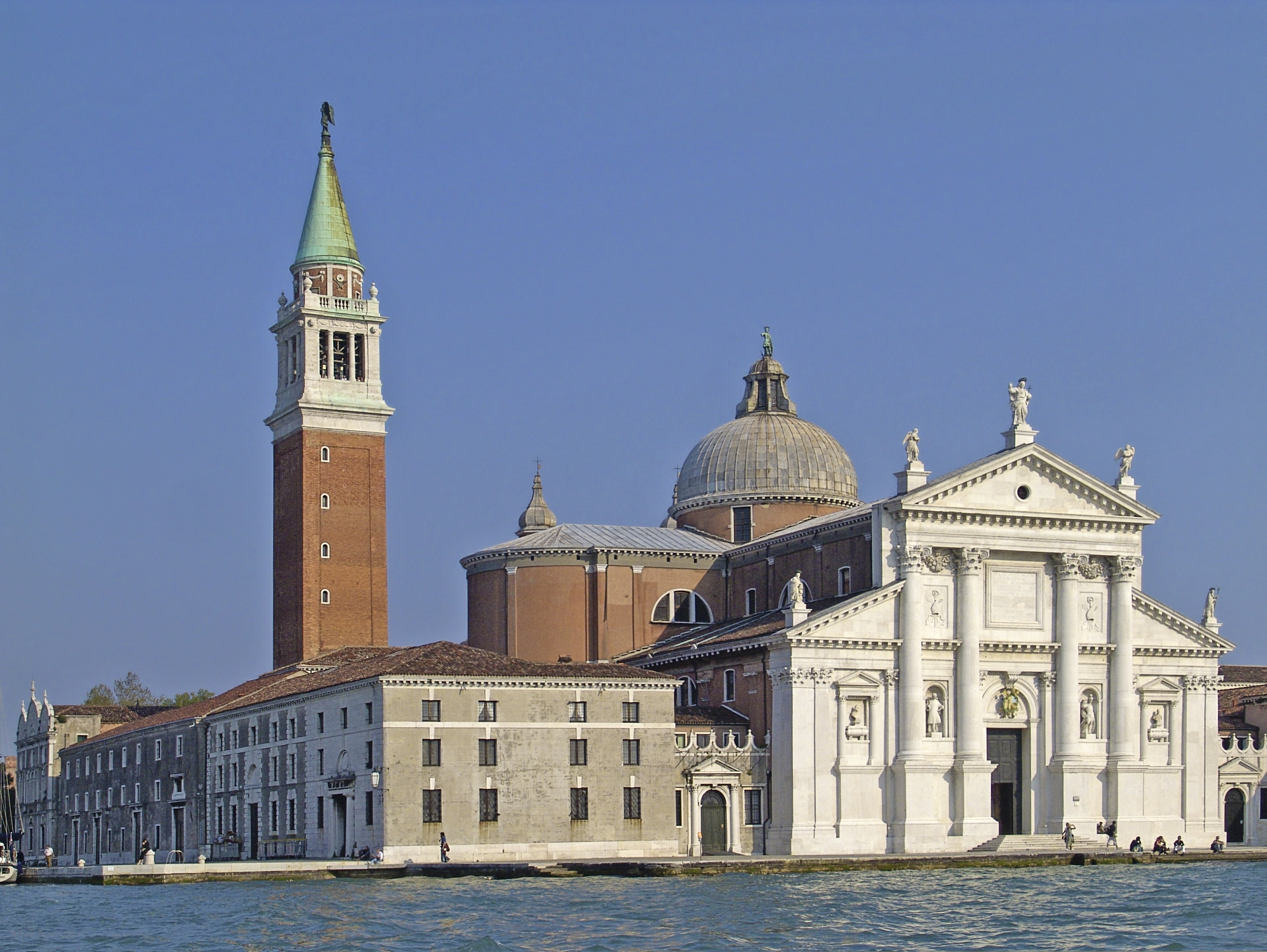
San Giorgio Maggiore, Venice, Italy (Roman Catholic)

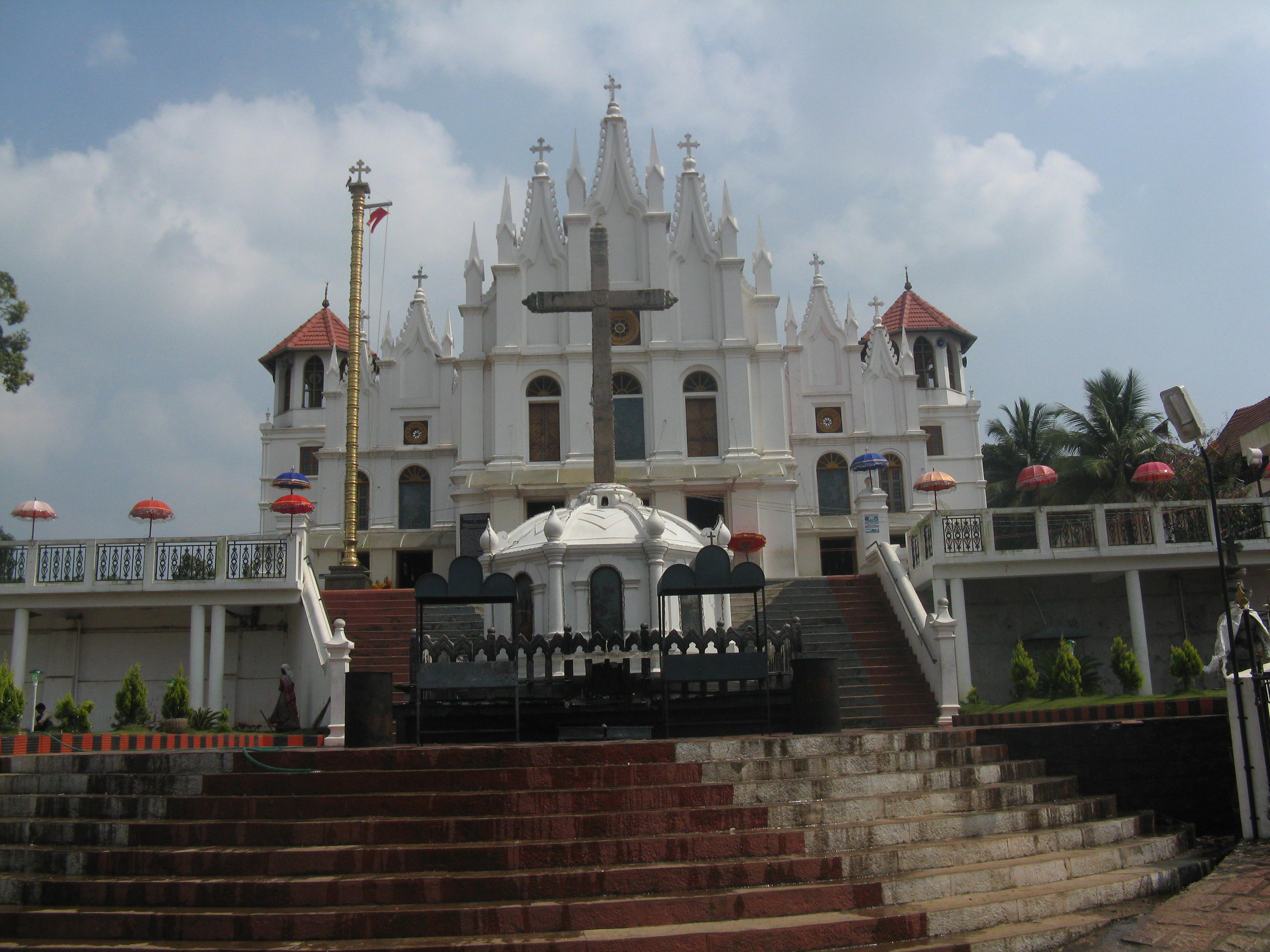
St. George Orthodox Church Puthuppally Pally, India (Indian Orthodox)

==== Altars ====
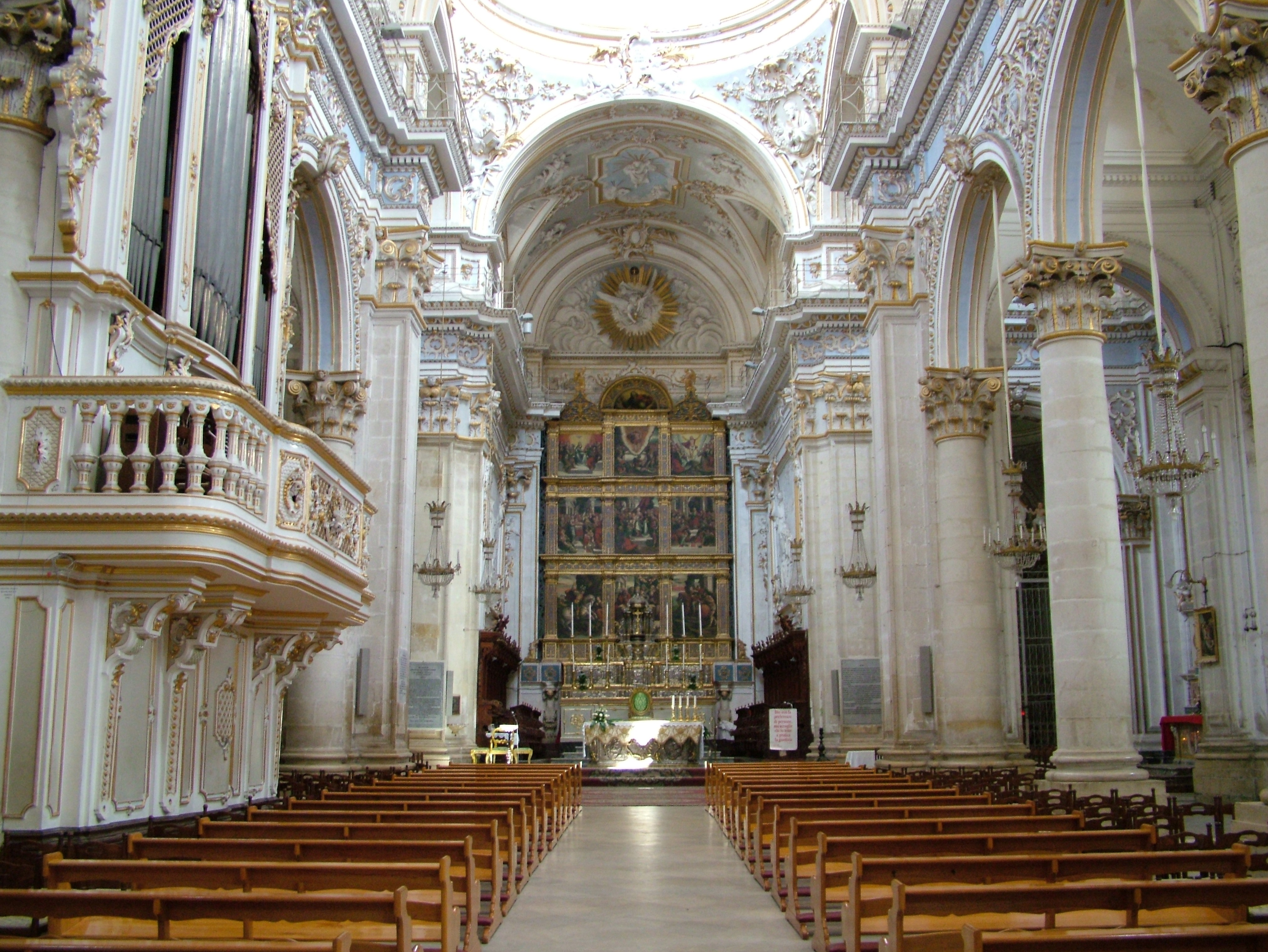
San Giorgio Church, Modica, Sicily, Italy

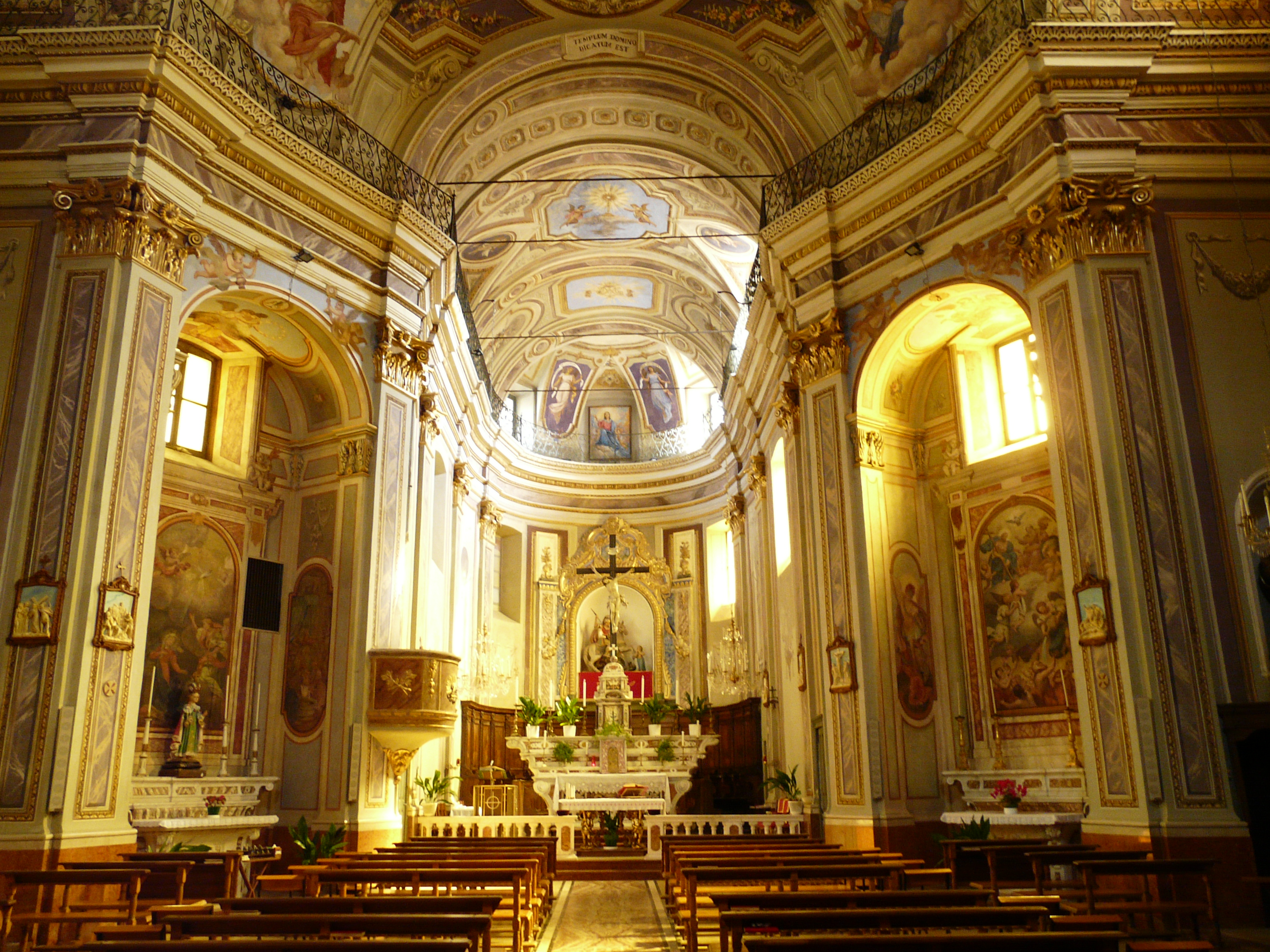
San Giorgio Church, Bormida, Liguria, Italy

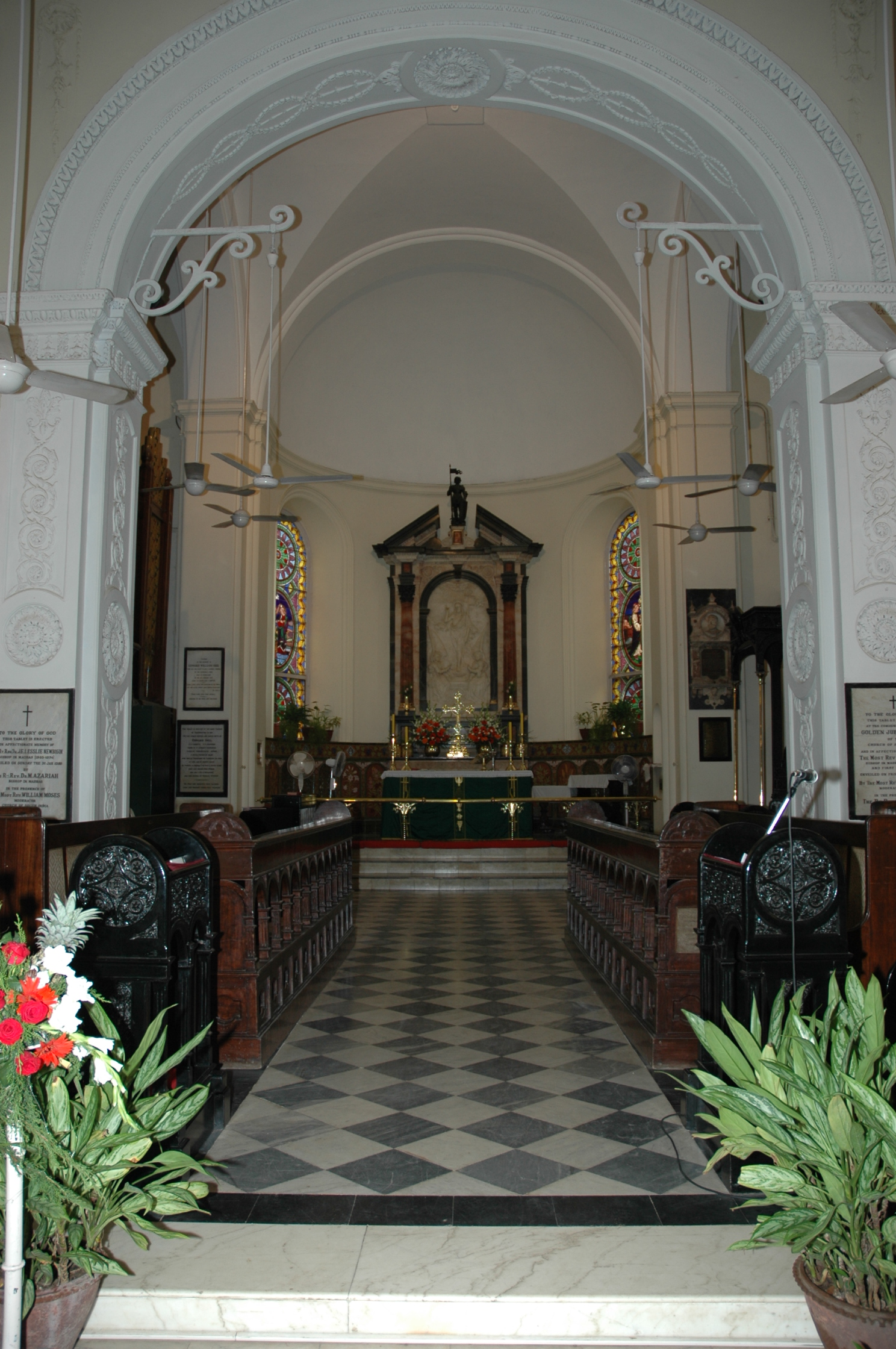
St. George's Cathedral, Chennai, India

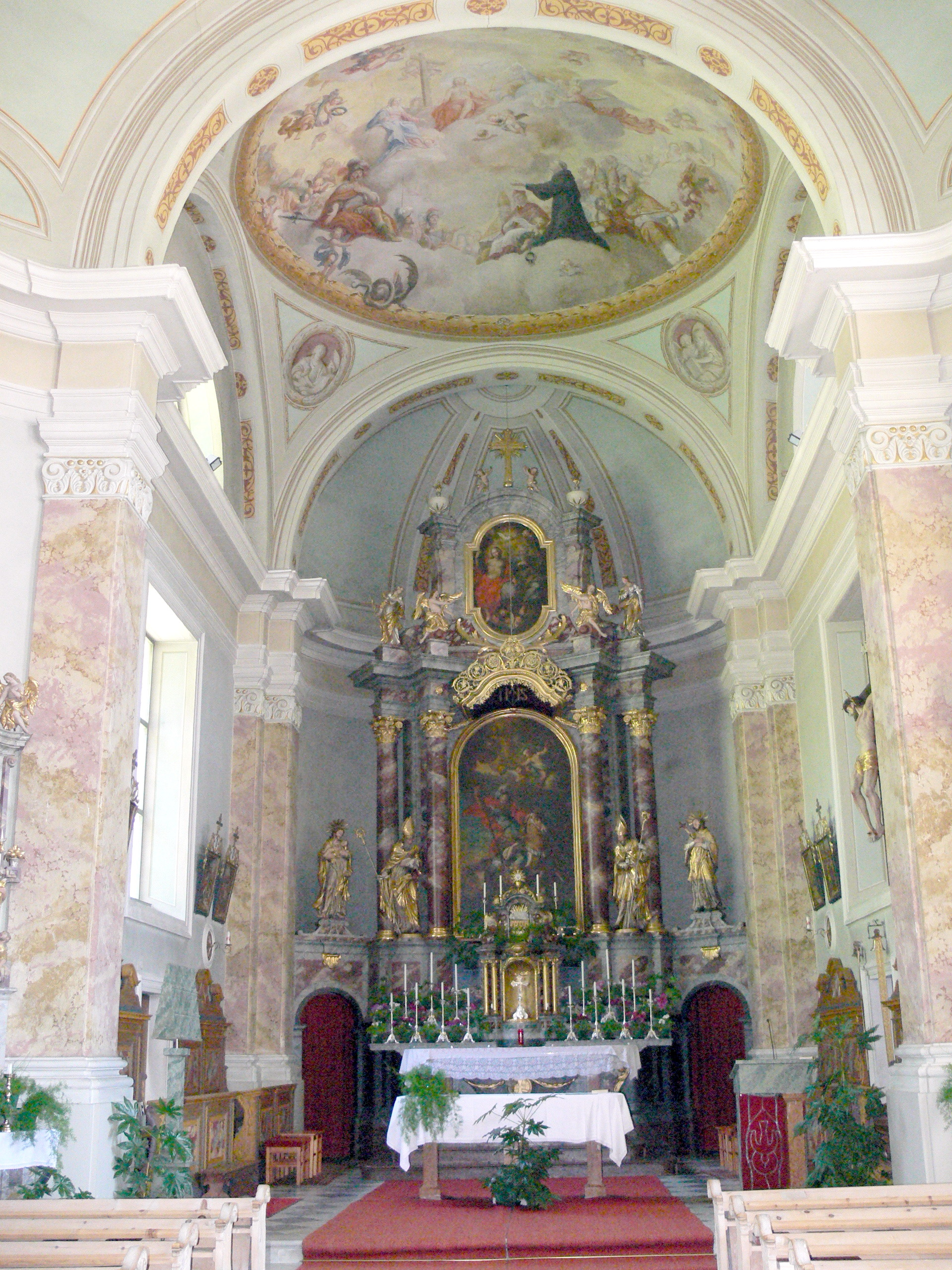
Antholz-Mittertal Church, Tyrol, Austria
