= Georgslied =

Georgslied

The Georgslied (Song of St. George) is a set of poems and hymns to Saint George in Old High German.

Its likely origin is Saint George's Abbey on the Reichenau monastic island on Lake Constance in Germany, which was founded in 888 and was an important center for the veneration of Saint George. Georgslied was composed towards the end of the 9th century and was partially transcribed by around 1000.

The poem in 57 or so verses is found in the Heidelberg manuscript, which also contains one of the texts of the Evangelienbuch of Otfrid of Weissenburg (to whom it was formerly attributed). The partial transcription by a scribe named Wisolf ran into difficulties and he ended with the words: "nequeo Vuisolf" ("I am unable. Wisolf"). There is no indication of whether Wisolf was writing down an oral text or whether he was copying an earlier written version.

== Sources ==
- Bostock, John (1976). A Handbook of Old High German. ISBN 0-19-815392-9.
- Garland, Mary (1997). The Oxford Companion to German Literature. Oxford University Press. p. 274. ISBN 0-19-815896-3.
- Wells, C. J. (1985). German, a linguistic history to 1945. Oxford University Press. p. 48. ISBN 0-19-815795-9.
