= Church of Saint George (Reichenau) =

Church on the island of Reichenau in Germany

Coordinates: 47°41′21″N 9°04′55″E

South-east view of the church

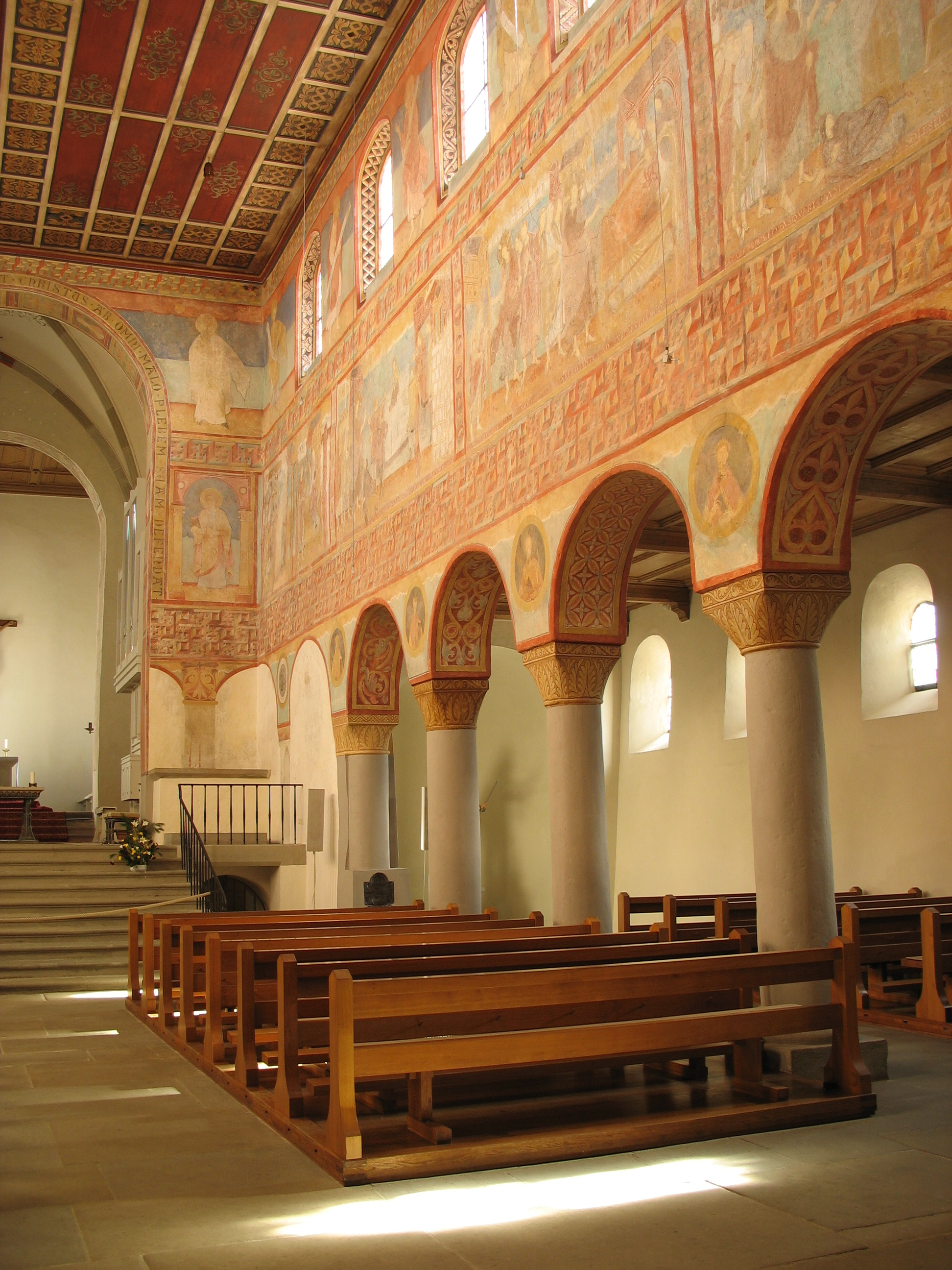
10th-century frescoes of the Church of St. George

The Church of Saint George is a Roman Catholic church. It is part of Reichenau Abbey founded in 724, located on the island of Reichenau on Lake Constance in southern Germany. The island is home to the churches of Saint Mary, Marcus, Peter and Paul. The church was built in the late 9th century to house the relic head of Saint George, a gift from Pope Gregory II, which commemorated a visit to Rome by Abbot Hoito in 896.

The church is owned and run by the Catholic Church of Saint George Fund. The church interior is decorated with wall paintings that depict stories and figures from scripture and was designed for those who dedicate their lives to prayer and worship.

== Frescoes ==
The church hosts frescoes were added in the 10th century. They are not frescoes in the proper sense of the word but are fresco-secco where the painting is applied to a dry surface. The wall paintings typify artistic expression from the Middle Ages and are unique for their age and location. They are the only preserved complete set of wall paintings produced north of the Alps before 1000 AD.

The frescoes are divided into three zones. The first and lowest zone is located between the nave and the arches. The second zone is above the arches. The third and highest zone is located above the windows. The lowest panel depicts the monasteries at Reichenau Island. The second is the most researched zone. It portrays Christ's miracles. The top panel depicts Old Testament prophets and New Testament apostles.

Each fresco details a specific story from the life of Christ. Descriptive inscriptions, or Tituli, accompany the paintings.

=== The eight miracles and their Titular ===
1. The Healing of the Demon-Possessed Man (Mark 5:1–19) “The demon is driven out, which bears the name Legion. Then [the demons] enter the swine. They throw themselves into the open sea”
2. The Healing of a Man with Dropsy (Luke 14:1–11) “A man with dropsy comes straight toward the path and is healed. He goes there loaded. He returns freed of the burden.”
3. The Calming of the Windstorm on the Sea of Galilee (Matthew 8:23–27) “God sleeps in his bodily form; east and south wind in particular break lose. With sovereign power, he gives the command. Wind and water are calm.”
4. The Healing of the Man Born Blind (John 9:1–38) “Here the one born without light is anointed with saliva and clay and...” (the remainder of the inscription is unreadable due to partial destruction).
5. Healing of a Leper (Matthew 8:1–13) “... thankfully gives...” (inscription mostly destroyed)
6. Raising of the Young Man of Nain (Luke 7:11–16) “Dead one, rise quickly, and by rising and at the same time saying, return to life!/ And so drive away all sadness of your widowed mother!”
7. The Daughter of Jairus Restored to Life and a Sick Woman Healed (Matthew 9:18–26) “See, the faith of the ruler encourages you, Jesus, to say, By the power of [my] force I want to, ‘Magdalena now arise’!”
8. Lazarus Raised from the Dead (John 11:1–45) “Lazarus, come forth! you who have already been buried four days! ‘Leave the delay in death.’: Thus speaks the Father's image.”

== UNESCO ==
Reichenau island was declared a UNESCO World Heritage Site in 2000. According to UNESCO, the island, including the frescoes of the Church at St. George, are protected based on the following criteria: the remains bear witness to the role of Medieval Benedictine monasteries; they are a strong example of monastic architecture in Central Europe from the 9th to 11th century; and they held great artistic significance in Europe at the time.

== Restoration and recent damage ==
Following their discovery in 1856, the frescoes significantly faded. The paintings depicting the life of Christ were to be preserved in an authentic state and not restored, reflecting their historic and artistic value. The Swiss technique of Bildtapeten, or picture wallpaper, was introduced to the church as a way to display a clean mural without restoring the original work. Depending on the visitors, the Bildtapeten could be raised and lowered from a mechanism installed in the ceiling. For example, the Bildtapeten might be lowered for mass to provide a complete picture of the paintings, then raised to reveal the original frescoes when art historians or other experts are inspecting the walls. Academic painter Carl Schilling began creating and installing the Bildtapeten in 1889 and completed the project in 1891. In 1909, the Bildtapeten was removed after a part of the mechanism broke. A restoration that included partial repainting and artificial patination was completed by Victor Mezger between 1921 and 1922.

A subsequent rise in visitors damaged the frescoes, requiring the church to closely monitor their state. This increase has led to climate change within the church building. As more bodies enter the church each year, the humidity and pollution levels in the building increase. This humidity and pollution created an environment ideal for the growth of mold and bacteria, further damaging the frescoes.

The frescoes are monitored by Landesamt für Denkmalpflege and the University of Stuttgart, Institute for Materials of Architecture. These groups collect data on indoor climate, microclimate impacts, air motion, radiation, and visitation. These data were expected help prompt new methods by which to regulate the indoor climate, including visitor access.

== See also ==
- List of churches under the patronage of Saint George
