= San Giorgio, Siena =

Roman Catholic church in Tuscany, Italy

Coordinates: 43°19′03.02″N 11°20′10.06″E

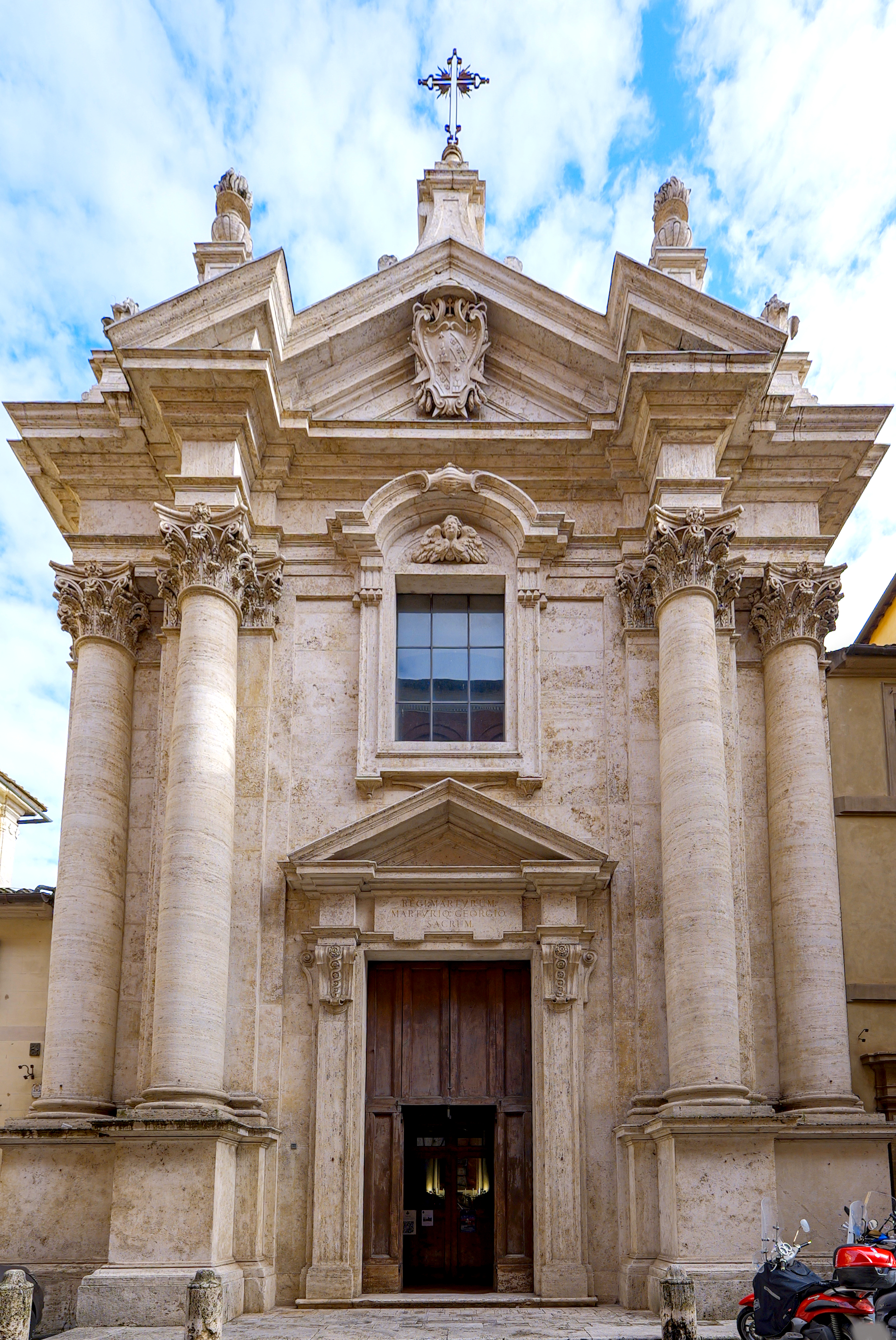
Façade of the church.

San Giorgio is a Baroque style, Roman Catholic church located on Via di Pantaneto #113 in the Terzo San Martino of the city of Siena, region of Tuscany, Italy.

== History ==
A church at the site existed since the 11th century. Tradition holds that the church was then rebuilt with donations made by the German mercenaries fighting alongside the Sienese in the 1260 Battle of Montaperti, where it is said the militia had called on Saint George for help in defeating the Guelf Florentine army.

Of the medieval edifice only the Romanesque-Gothic bell tower remains today. The current appearance dates to the intervention of architect Pietro Cremona, who finished its reconstruction in 1738.

The façade is characterized by two giant columns and the coat of arms of Cardinal Anton Felice Zondadari, patron of the restoration. The transept houses the tombs of two member of the Zondadari family with a painting by F. Janssens.

In the interior, on the counterfaçade, is the polychrome funerary monument (1656) to the painter Francesco Vanni, set up by his son Michelangelo Vanni. The elder Vanni completed the canvas with the Crucifixion with Father Matteo Guerra, while an Encounter of the Lord with his Mother on the Calvary was painted by his son, Raffaello Vanni. The main altarpiece depicts St George and the Dragon, by Sebastiano Conca.

The tall Romanesque-style brick belltower, located just east of the apse and not easily visible from the street in front of the facade, was erected after the battle of Montaperto, the thirty-six windows represent the different Contrade.
