= Rumpelstiltskin (disambiguation) =

Rumpelstiltskin is a fairy tale.

Rumpelstiltskin may also refer to:

== Characters ==
- Rumplestiltskin (Once Upon a Time), from the American TV series Once Upon a Time
- Rumpelstiltskin (Shrek), from the Shrek film series

== Film ==
- Rumpelstiltskin (1915 film), an American silent film, directed by Raymond B. West
- Rumpelstiltskin (1940 film), a German fantasy film, directed by Alf Zengerling
- Rumpelstiltskin (1955 film), a German fantasy film, directed by Herbert B. Fredersdorf
- Repelsteeltjie (1973 film), a Netherlands film, directed by Harry Kumel, starring Ruger Hauer
- Rumpelstiltskin (1985 film), a twenty-four-minute animated feature
- Rumpelstiltskin (1987 film), an American-Israeli film
- Rumpelstiltskin (1995 film), an American horror film, loosely based on the Grimm fairy tale
- Rumpelstilzchen (2009 film), a German TV adaptation of the fairy tale starring Gottfried John and Julie Engelbrecht

== Other uses ==
- Rumpelstiltskin (album), a 1992 album by Tangerine Dream
- Rumplestiltskin (horse) (foaled 2003), an Irish Thoroughbred racehorse
- Rumpelstiltskin (1965 musical), a Hebrew language-musical
- Rumpelstiltskin (2011 musical), an American stage musical
- "Rumpelstiltskin" (Faerie Tale Theatre), a television episode
- "Rumpelstilskin", an episode of Super Why!
- Rumpletilskinz, an American Hip-hop group
- Rumpletilskinz, a British hard-rock/psych band
- Stiltskin, a Scottish rock band
