= Rumpelstiltskin =

German fairy tale

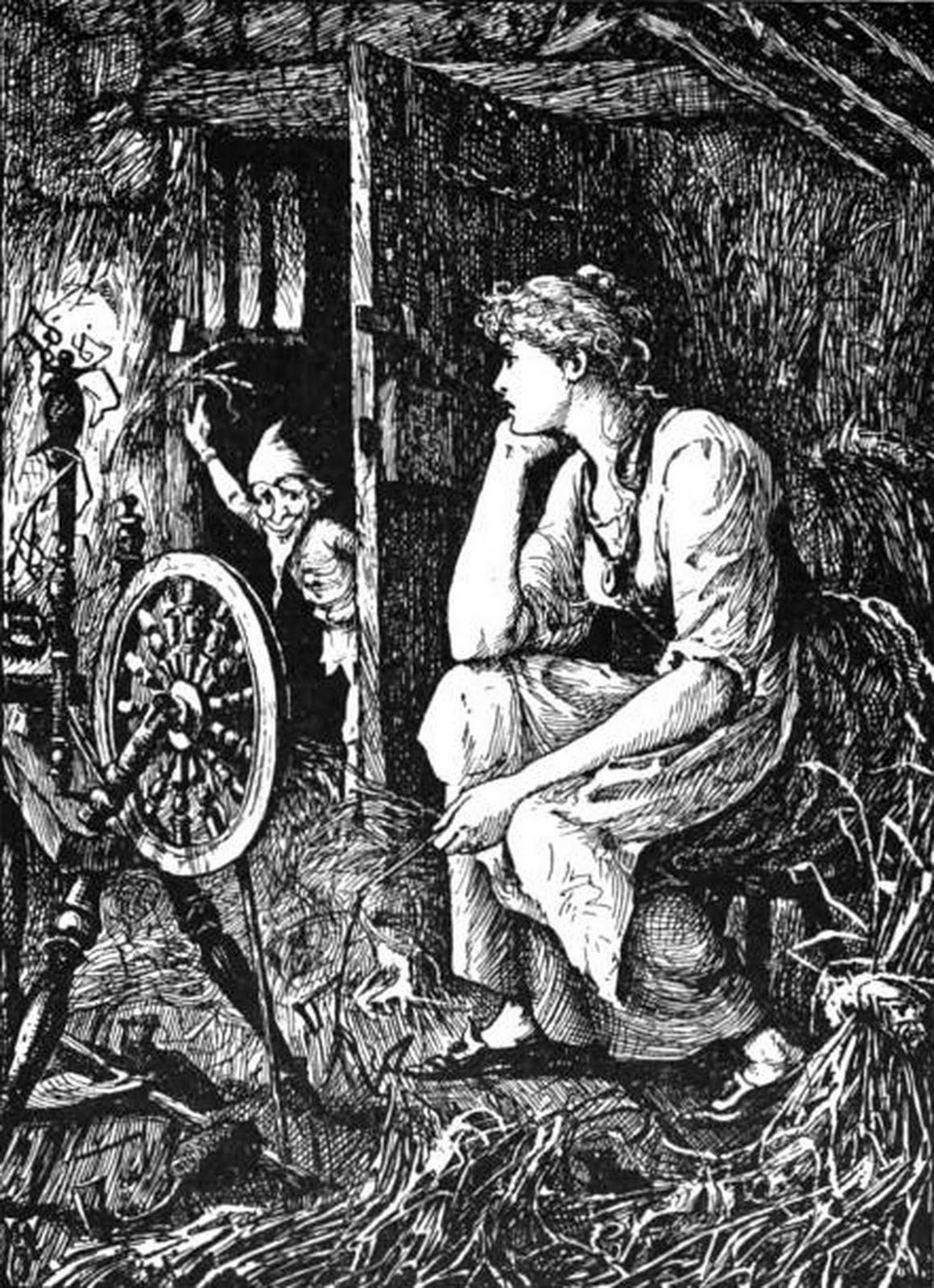
- Illustration from Andrew Lang's The Blue Fairy Book (1889)

Folk tale
- Name: Rumpelstiltskin
- Also known as: Tom Tit Tot; Päronskaft; Repelsteeltje; Cvilidreta; Rampelník; Tűzmanócska; Eiman
- Aarne–Thompson grouping: ATU 500 (The Name of the Helper; The Name of the Supernatural Helper)
- Country: Germany; United Kingdom; Netherlands; Czech Republic; Hungary
- Published in: Grimm's Fairy Tales; English Fairy Tales

"Rumpelstiltskin" (/ˌrʌmpəlˈstɪltskɪn/ RUMP-əl-STILT-skin; German: Rumpelstilzchen [ˈʁʊmpl̩ˌʃtiːltsçn̩]) is a German fairy tale collected by the Brothers Grimm in the 1812 edition of Children's and Household Tales. The story is about an imp who spins straw into gold in exchange for a woman's firstborn child.

== Plot ==
A miller, in audience with his king, boasts that his daughter can spin straw into gold. (Note: Some versions make the miller's daughter blonde and describe the "straw-into-gold" claim as a careless boast the miller makes about the way his daughter's straw-like blond hair takes on a gold-like lustre when sunshine strikes it.) The king calls for the girl, locks her up in a tower room filled with straw and a spinning wheel, and demands she spin the straw into gold by morning or he will have her killed. (Note: Other versions have the king threatening to lock her up in a dungeon forever, or to punish her father for lying.) When she has given up all hope, a little imp-like man appears in the room and spins the straw into gold in return for her necklace of glass beads. The next morning the king takes the girl to a larger room filled with straw to repeat the feat, and the imp once again spins, in return for the girl's glass ring. On the third day the girl is taken to an even larger room filled with straw, and told by the king that if she can spin all this straw into gold he will marry her, but if she cannot she will be executed. While she is sobbing alone in the room, the little imp appears again and promises that he can spin the straw into gold for her, but the girl tells him she has nothing left with which to pay. The imp suggests she pay him with her first child. She reluctantly agrees, thinking he will forget about the deal, and he sets about spinning the straw into gold. (Note: In some versions, the imp appears and begins to turn the straw into gold, paying no heed to the girl's protests that she has nothing to pay him with; when he finishes the task, he states that the price is her first child, and the horrified girl objects because she never agreed to this arrangement.)

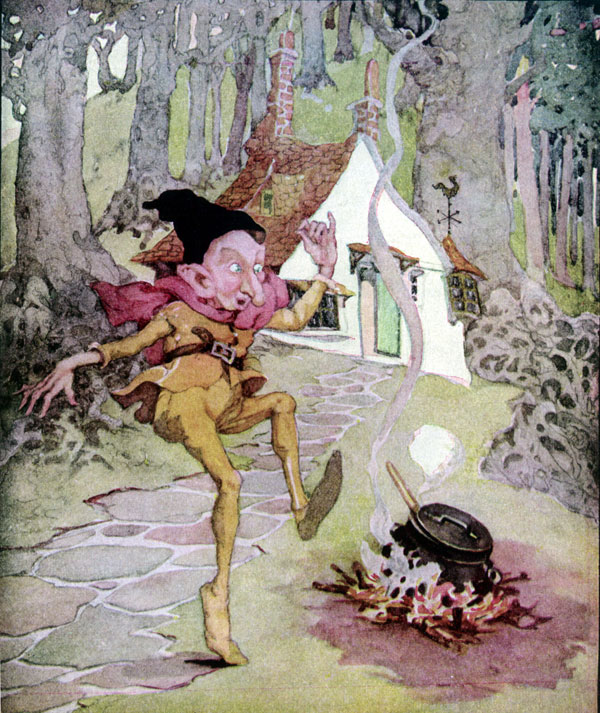
Illustration by Anne Anderson from Grimm's Fairy Tales (London and Glasgow 1922)

The king keeps his promise to marry the miller's daughter. Alas, when their first child is born, the imp returns to claim his payment. She offers him all the wealth she has to keep the child, but the imp refuses. He finally agrees to give up his claim to the child if she can guess his name within three days. (Note: Some versions have the imp limiting the number of daily guesses to three and hence the total number of guesses allowed to a maximum of nine.)

Despite sending knights to search for names, the queen's many guesses fail. However, before the final night, she wanders into the woods (Note: In some versions, she sends a servant into the woods instead of going herself, in order to keep the king's suspicions at bay.) searching for him and comes across his remote mountain cottage and watches, unseen, as he hops about his fire and sings. He reveals his name in his song's lyrics: "Tonight, tonight, my plans I make. Tomorrow, tomorrow, the baby I take. The queen will never win the game, for Rumpelstiltskin is my name". (Note: The German song is "Heute back ich, morgen brau ich, übermorgen hol ich der Königin ihr Kind. Ach, wie gut ist, dass niemand weiß, dass ich Rumpelstilzchen heiß." This translates literally as "Today I bake, tomorrow I brew, the day after I get the Queen's child. How good it is that no one knows that I'm called Rumpelstiltskin".)

When the imp comes to the queen on the third day, after first feigning ignorance, she reveals his name, and he loses his temper at the loss of their bargain. Versions vary about whether he accuses the devil or witches of having revealed his name to the queen. In the 1812 edition of the Brothers Grimm tales, Rumpelstiltskin then "ran away angrily, and never came back". The ending was revised in an 1857 edition to a more gruesome ending wherein Rumpelstiltskin "in his rage drove his right foot so far into the ground that it sank in up to his waist; then in a passion he seized the left foot with both hands and tore himself in two". Other versions have Rumpelstiltskin driving his right foot so far into the ground that he creates a chasm and falls into it, never to be seen again. In the oral version originally collected by the Brothers Grimm, Rumpelstiltskin flies out of the window on a cooking ladle.

== History ==
According to researchers at Durham University and the NOVA University Lisbon, the origins of the story can be traced back to around 4,000 years ago. A possible early literary reference to the tale appears in Dionysius of Halicarnassus's Roman Antiquities, in the 1st century AD.

== Variants ==
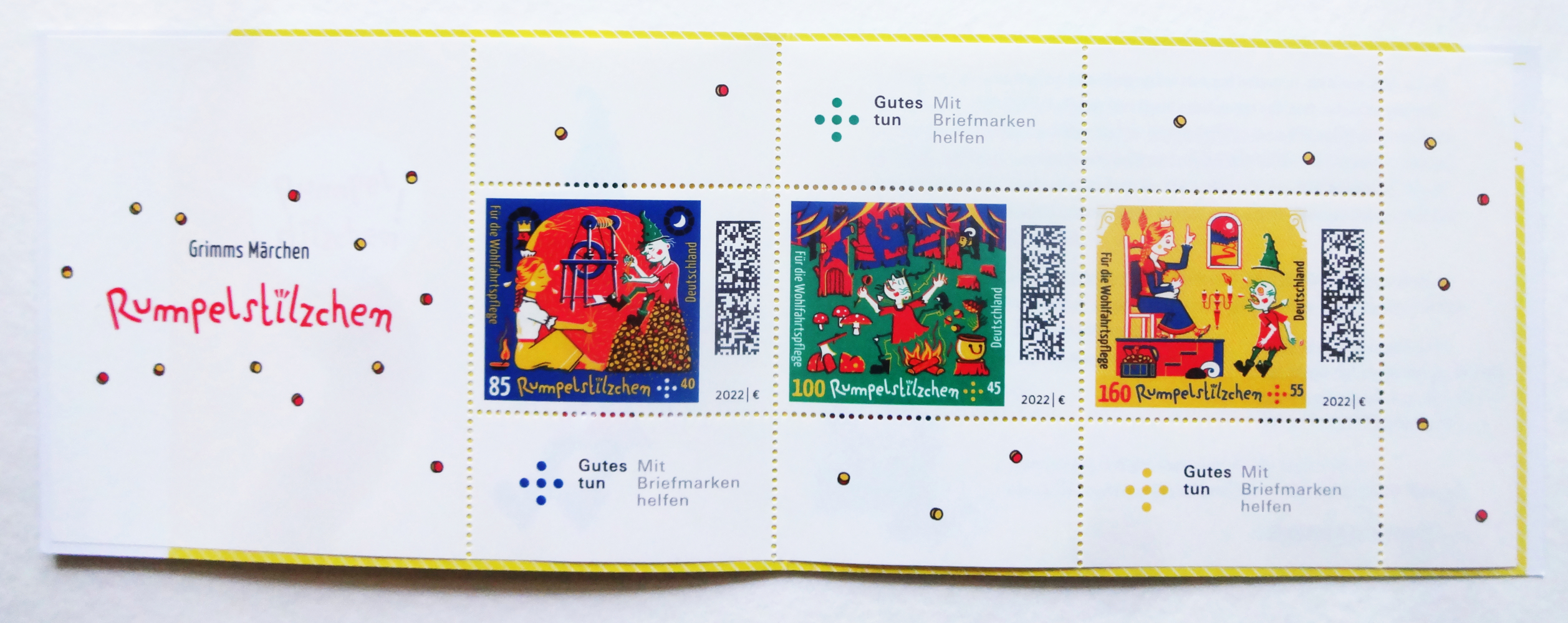
Grimms' fairytale stamp series of Rumpelstilzchen stamp set from the Deutsche Post of the BRD by artist Michael Kunter, 2022

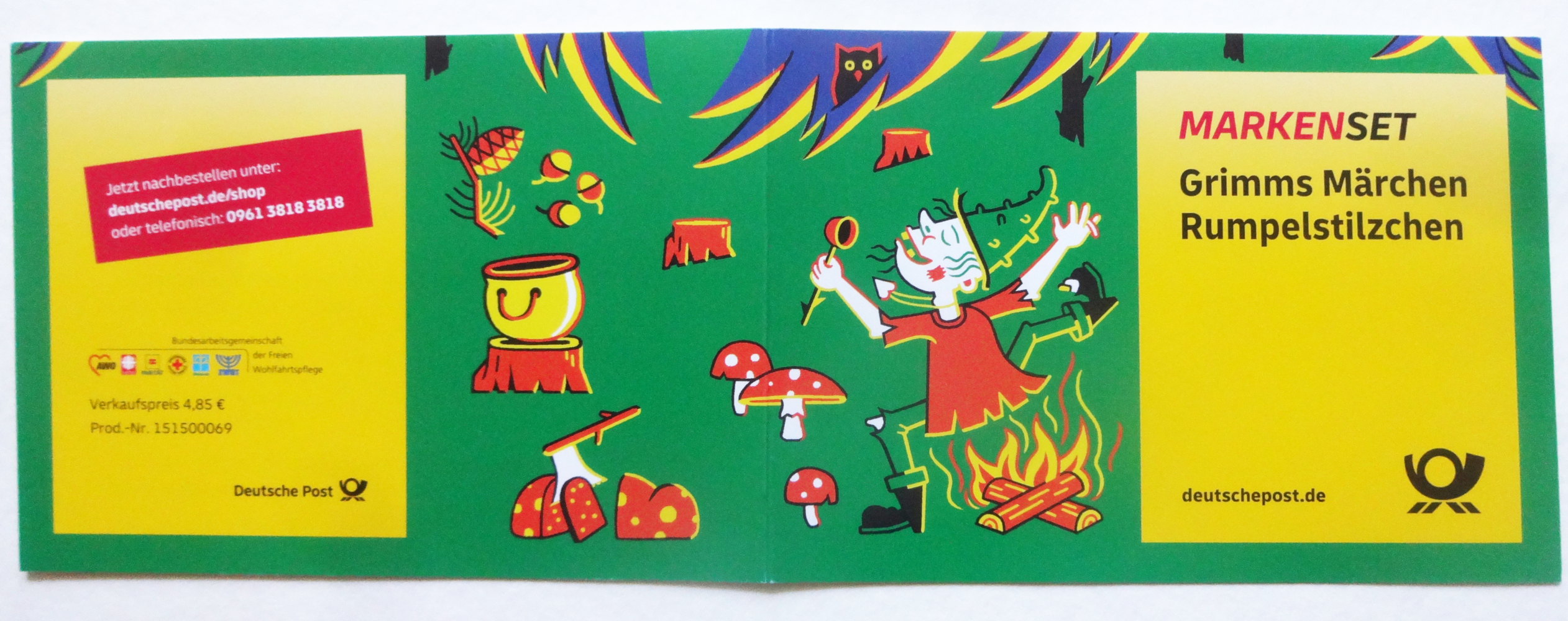
Grimms' fairytale stamp series of Rumpelstilzchen stamp set front cover from the Deutsche Post of the BRD by artist Michael Kunter, 2022

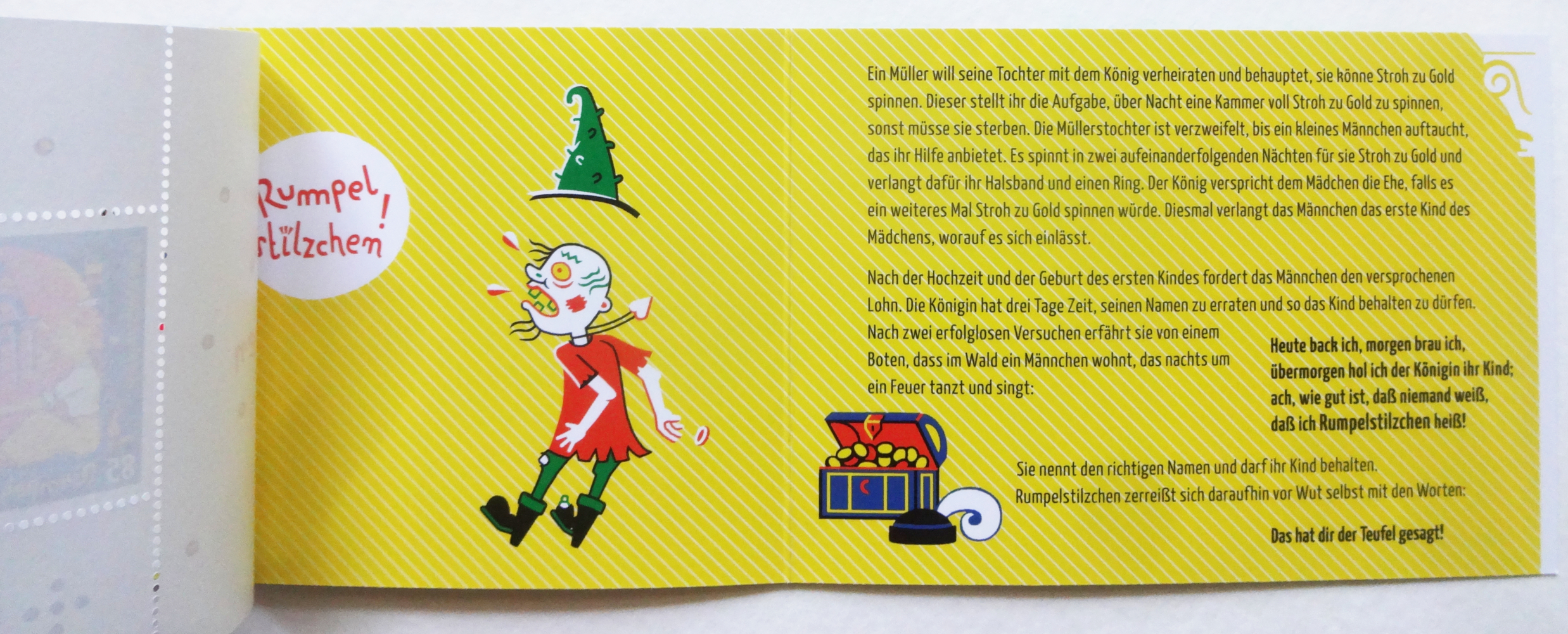
Grimms' fairytale stamp series of Rumpelstilzchen stamp set inner cover from the Deutsche Post of the BRD by artist Michael Kunter, 2022, reciting the concise version of the story and the song Rumpelstilzchen sings

The same story pattern appears in numerous other cultures: Tom Tit Tot in the United Kingdom (from English Fairy Tales, 1890, by Joseph Jacobs); Whuppity Stoorie in Scotland (from Robert Chambers's Popular Rhymes of Scotland, 1826); Gilitrutt in Iceland.

In Celtic fairytales, the Cornish tale of Duffy and the Devil plays out an essentially similar plot featuring a "devil" named Terry-top. The Lazy Beauty and her Aunts in Ireland (from The Fireside Stories of Ireland, 1870 by Patrick Kennedy), though subsequent research has revealed an earlier published version called The White Hen by Ellen Fitzsimon. Two tales in Welsh folklore feature magical creatures with secret names, the Gwarwyn-a-throt must conceal their own name in order to preserve their power, but are as often caught out in a careless moment. The Gwarwyn-a-throt is undone by foolishly repeating his own name to himself, until he is overheard by his intended victim. John Rhys recorded another Welsh tale where possession of a fairy maiden's name constrains her to marry the man who discovers it.

The story also appears as Juʿaydān (جعيدان; "He who talks too much") in Arabic; Khlamushka (Хламушка; "Junker") in Russia; Rumplcimprcampr, Rampelník or Martin Zvonek in the Czech Republic; Martinko Klingáč in Slovakia; Cvilidreta in Croatia; Ruidoquedito ("Little noise") in South America; Pancimanci in Hungary (from an 1862 folktale collection by László Arany); Daiku to Oniroku (大工と鬼六 "The carpenter and the ogre") in Japan; Myrmidon in France and Foul-Weather in Cornwall.

An earlier literary variant in French was penned by Mme. L'Héritier, titled Ricdin-Ricdon. A version of it exists in the compilation Le Cabinet des Fées, Vol. XII. pp. 125–131.

All these tales are classified in the Aarne–Thompson–Uther Index as tale type ATU 500, "The Name of the Supernatural Helper". According to scholarship, it is popular in Denmark, Finland, Germany and Ireland.

== Name ==
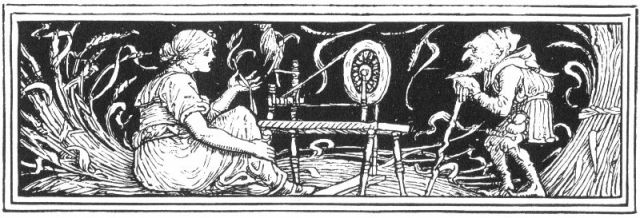
Illustration by Walter Crane from Household Stories by the Brothers Grimm (1886)

"Rumpelstiltskin" is usually explained as literally meaning "little rattle stilt". The ending -chen in the German form Rumpelstilzchen is a diminutive cognate to English -kin.

Rumpelstilzchen is regarded as containing Stilzchen, diminutive of Stelze "stilt". (Note: Donald B. Rinsley's clinical paper cites Bergler, but states that this association with "stilt" is mistaken.) This etymology seems endorsed by Hans-Jörg Uther's handbook on the Grimms Kinder- und Hausmärchen. Uther cites HdA which gives the examples of Bachstelze, Wasserstelze (names of birds; stilt) as paralleling examples. However, this was not the etymology hinted at by Jacob Grimm.

Harry Rand's book on this fairy suggests that Rumpel is not just a noise, but originally a crumpling noise, associated with shrunkenness and dwarfness, as apropos for the imp. So the name Rumpel-stilts is an oxymoronic juxtaposition, embodying the dichotomy of "shortness-tallness". Succinctly it may also be rendered as "crumpled stalk".

Brewer's Dictionary of Phrase & Fable boldly and succinctly states it meaning as "wrinkled foreskin" or "prepuce", which correlates with the "crumpled stalk" if stalk is considered as a euphemism.

Grimm suggested -stilt, -stiltchen from Old German stalt with some uncertainty, and did not much elaborate. Graff's dictionary indicates that Rumpelstilts, or rather the form Rumpelstilz was corrupted phonetically towards Stolz 'haughtiness', but the correct etymology points to stalt as Grimm suggested, and this goes to "stal (1)" meaning "locus, location, place" and stellen meaning to "set, place".{ (Note: Graff lists as parallel example the German word Hagestolz meaning 'confirmed bachelor', which seems also to contain the steim Stolz 'haughtiness' but is also actually rooted from stalt. The explanatory on this Hagestolz word by Rudolf Steiner and Christopher Bamford is illuminating.)

The meaning is similar to rumpelgeist ("rattle-ghost") or poltergeist ("rumble-ghost"), a mischievous spirit that clatters and moves household objects. The name is believed to be derived from Johann Fischart's Geschichtklitterung, or Gargantua of 1577 (a loose adaptation of Rabelais's Gargantua and Pantagruel), which refers to an "amusement" for children, a children's game named "Rumpele stilt oder der Poppart". Thus a rumpelstilt or rumpelstilz was also known by such names as pophart or poppart, that makes noises by rattling posts and rapping on planks. (Other related concepts are mummarts or boggarts and hobs, which are mischievous household spirits that disguise themselves.)

=== Translations ===
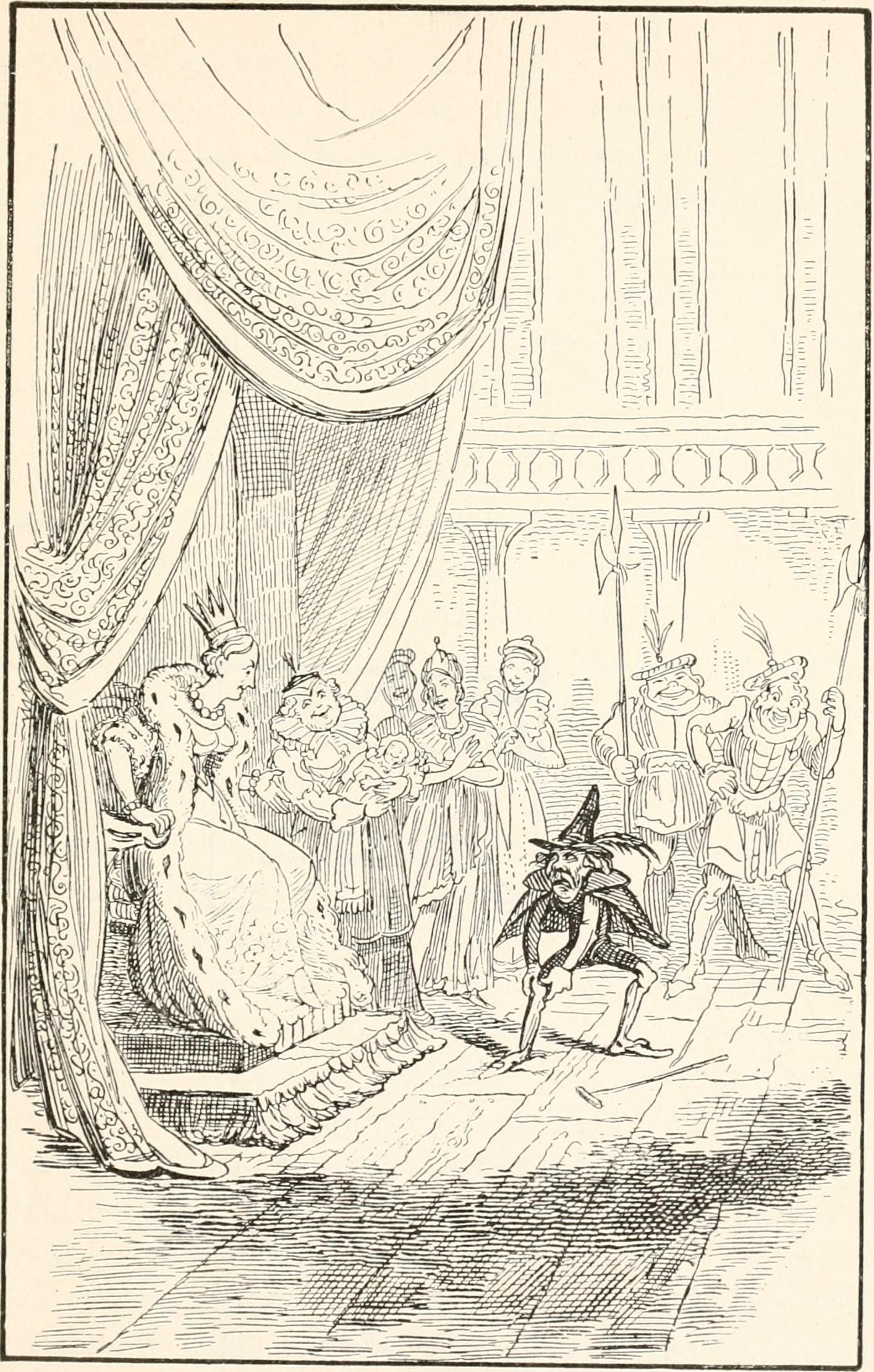
Illustration for the tale of "Rumpel-stilt-skin" from The heart of oak books (Boston 1910).

Translations of the original Grimm fairy tale (KHM 55) into various languages have generally substituted different names for the dwarf whose name is Rumpelstilzchen. For some languages, a name was chosen that comes close in sound to the German name: Rumpelstiltskin or Rumplestiltskin in English, Repelsteeltje in Dutch, Rumleskaft in Norwegian and Danish, Rumpelstichen in Brazilian Portuguese, Rumpelstinski, Rumpelestíjeles, Trasgolisto, Jasil el Trasgu, Barabay, Rompelimbrá, Barrabás, Ruidoquedito, Rompeltisquillo, Tiribilitín, Tremolín, El enano saltarín and el duende saltarín in Spanish, Rumplcimprcampr or Rampelník in Czech.

In Japanese, it is transcribed as ルンペルシュティルツヒェン, Runperushutirutsuhyen. The Russian name is close to the original German, Румпельштильцхен, Rumpel'shtíl'tskhen.

In other languages, the name was translated in a poetic and approximate way. Thus Rumpelstilzchen is known as Päronskaft (literally "Pear-stalk") or Bullerskaft (literally "Rumble-stalk") in Swedish, where the sense of stilt or stalk of the second part is retained.

Slovak translations use Martinko Klingáč. Polish translations use Titelitury (or Rumpelsztyk) and Finnish ones Tittelintuure, Rompanruoja or Hopskukkeli. The Hungarian name is Tűzmanócska and in Serbo-Croatian Cvilidreta ("Whine-screamer"). The Slovenian translation uses Špicparkeljc ("Pointy-Hoof").

In Italian, the creature is usually called Tremotino, which is probably formed from the world tremoto, which means "earthquake" in Tuscan dialect, and the suffix "-ino", which generally indicates a small and/or sly character. The first Italian edition of the fables was published in 1897, and the books in those years were all written in Tuscan Italian.

For Hebrew, the poet Avraham Shlonsky composed the name עוּץ־לִי גּוּץ־לִי Utz-li gutz-li, a compact and rhymy touch to the original sentence and meaning of the story, "My-Adviser My-Midget", from יוֹעֵץ, yo'etz, "adviser", and גּוּץ, gutz, "squat, dumpy, pudgy (about a person)", when using the fairy-tale as the basis of a children's musical, now a classic among Hebrew children's plays.

Greek translations have used Ρουμπελστίλτσκιν (from the English) or Κουτσοκαλιγέρης (Koutsokaliyéris), which could figure as a Greek surname, formed with the particle κούτσο- (koútso- "limping"), and is perhaps derived from the Hebrew name.

Urdu versions of the tale used the name Tees Mar Khan for the imp.

== Interpretation ==
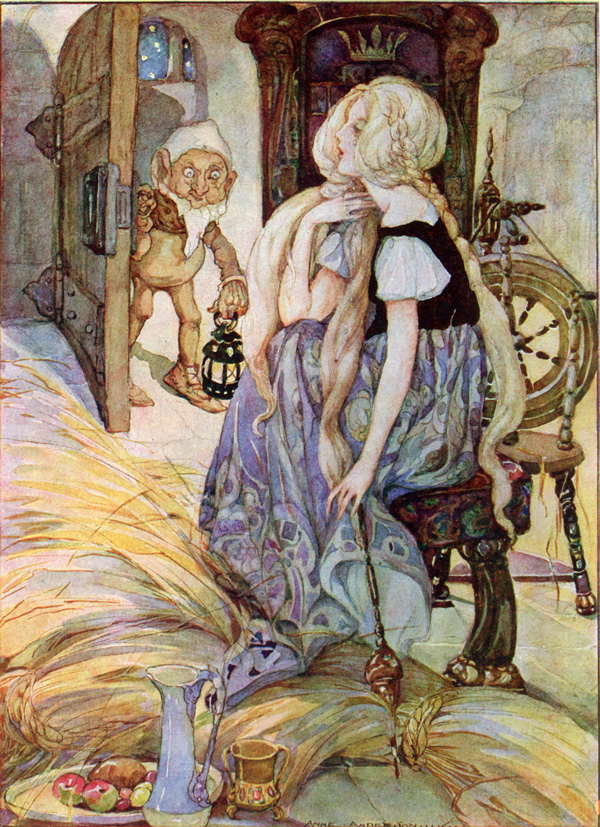
"The Miller's Daughter" by Anne Anderson

=== Common parlance ===
The name "Rumpelstiltskin" is sometimes used as an insult towards shorter people or individuals with dwarfism, especially if they are prone to aggression and anger quickly. In some places, such as Oberbayern, Germany, "a Rumpelstilz" refers to someone who is hotheaded, even if they are not below average height. Since the 19th Century, interpreters of fairy tales have believed that dwarves and similar folk were seen as part of an oppressed and later demonized indigenous population, who sought to improve their genetics by stealing children. Various interpretations assert that themes of financial narcissism and marriage stand behind the motives of riduculousness. (Otto Kahn: Rumpelstilz hat wirklich gelebt, 1967, Freud, Wittgenstein, Bühler, von Beit, etc). Lutz Röhrich, folklorist and researcher, concludes that it is not possible to apply these sentiments to the version of the story which was popularized by the Brothers Grimm.

=== Psychoanalysis ===
In 1897, Sigmund Freud wrote to Wilhelm Fließ that he was joyous as Rumpelstiltskin because nobody besides him knew that dreams were wish-fulfillment. Freud interpreted the dream of a young woman after a visit from her husband: up a steep stairwell and through a small door, there came a small, bald man with a red nose into her brown room, where he danced strangely about. She was reminded of her father-in-law, and then she thought of Rumpelstiltskin. Ottokar Graf Wittgenstein interpreted the straw as a bed, the small man as the penis, and the young woman does not know anything about the gold yet. From -stilzchen (literally "little stock" when translated) he associated stehlen (stealing), stelzen (stilting), stolz (pride), stolzieren (strutting), and steif (stiff), like the gait of a stork which brings children. Charlotte Bühler and Josephine Bilz recognized the process of a girl maturing into a mother. For Wilhelm Salber, it was about the yearning towards ideal conditions, which was experienced as a labyrinth of activities of someone else's choosing.

== Rumpelstiltskin principle ==
The value and power of using personal names and titles is well established in psychology, management, teaching and trial law. It is often referred to as the "Rumpelstiltskin principle". It derives from a very ancient belief that to give or know the true name of a being is to have power over it. See Adam's naming of the animals in Genesis 2:19-20 for an example.

- Brodsky, Stanley (2013). "The Rumpelstiltskin Principle". APA.org. American Psychological Association.
- Winston, Patrick (16 August 2009). "The Rumpelstiltskin Principle". MIT.
- van der Geest, Sjak (2010). "Rumpelstiltskin: The magic of the right word". In Oderwald, Arko; van Tilburg, Willem; Neuvel, Koos (eds.). Unfamiliar knowledge: Psychiatric disorders in literature. Utrecht: De Tijdstroom.

== Media and popular culture ==
=== Literature adaptations ===
- Gold Spun, a 2021 first novel of a duology by Brandie June.
- Gilded, a 2021 first novel of a duology by Marissa Meyer
- Spinning Silver, a 2018 fantasy novel by Naomi Novik
- There is a modern interpretation of the character in the novel Smoke Bitten in the Mercy Thompson series by Patricia Briggs. He is referred to as the Smoke Beast for most of the book.

=== Film ===
- Rumpelstiltskin (1915 film), an American silent film, directed by Raymond B. West
- Rumpelstiltskin (1940 film), a German fantasy film, directed by Alf Zengerling
- Rumpelstiltskin (1955 film), a German fantasy film, directed by Herbert B. Fredersdorf
- Rumpelstiltskin (1985 film), a twenty-four-minute animated feature
- Rumpelstiltskin (1987 film), an American-Israeli film
- Rumpelstiltskin (1995 film), an American horror film, loosely based on the Grimm fairy tale
- Rumpelstilzchen (2009 film), a German TV adaptation starring Gottfried John and Julie Engelbrecht
- Rumpelstiltskin (2025 film), a British dark fantasy horror film, starring Hannah Baxter-Eve as Evelina, the miller's daughter.

=== Ensemble media ===
- The 1973 Turkish superhero film 3 Dev Adam features Rumpelstiltskin in a cameo appearance as a voyeuristic puppet in a bedroom intercourse scene involving Spider-Man with his girlfriend and sidekick Nadya. Appearing alongside him in the scene are two other voyeuristic puppets that are King Friday XIII and Constable Bobby. This film features several unauthorized characters including Captain America and El Santo.
- Adapted into the 1987-1989 anime series Grimm's Fairy Tale Classics, the miller's daughter's name is Gretchen (Helga in the Japanese version).
- The 1994 direct-to-video Muppet Classic Theater adapted the story, starring The Great Gonzo as the title character, Miss Piggy as the miller's daughter, and Kermit the Frog as the king. In this version of the story, Rumpelstiltskin reveals that his mother sent him to camp every summer until he was 18. The miller's daughter, who has her father, the king and the king's loyal royal advisor help her guess the name of the "weird, little man", recalls that "a good mother always sews her kid's name inside their clothes before sending them off to camp." Thus, the girl decides to check his clothing, and finds Rumpelstiltskin's name inside.
- "Rumpelstiltskin", a 1995 episode from Happily Ever After: Fairy Tales for Every Child.
- In the 1999 animated series Simsala Grimm, the miller's daughter's name is Sissi, the king's name became Friedrich Ferdinand, and the count's name is Sir Randolph. This version swapped the first two givings, first, the ring; then, the necklace of Sissi's dear departed mother. Upon the help of Yoyo and Doc Croc, King Friedrich Ferdinand realizes Sir Randolph's plan and banishes him from the castle, banning his return, before marrying Sissi. Rumpelstiltskin gives Yoyo and Doc Croc a few hours to reach Sissi before the end of the third day.
- Barney's Once Upon a Time involves the story told by Stella, with Shawn as the title character, Tosha as the miller's daughter, Carlos as the King, and Barney as the messenger.
- Rumpelstiltskin appears as a figment of Chief O'Brien's imagination in the 15th episode "If Wishes Were Horses" of season 1 in the Star Trek: Deep Space Nine.
- Rumpelstiltskin appears as a villainous character in the Shrek franchise, first voiced by Conrad Vernon in a minor role in Shrek the Third. In Shrek Forever After, the character's appearance and persona are significantly altered to become the main antagonist of the film, now voiced by Walt Dohrn.
- In Once Upon a Time, Rumplestiltskin is one of the integral characters, portrayed by Robert Carlyle. Within the interconnected fairy tale narrative, he acts as a composite character for the Crocodile from Peter Pan, the Beast of Beauty and the Beast and Cinderella's fairy godfather. The creators rewrote his character into the Dark One, an immortal and virtually almighty sorcerer and the kingmaker of the whole plot, who spins straw into gold as a hobby and is obsessed with contracts and agreements of any sort, always based on the refrain that "all magic comes with a price".
- Rumpelstiltskin appears in Ever After High as an infamous professor known for making students spin straw into gold as a form of extra credit and detention. He deliberately gives his students bad grades in such a way they are forced to ask for extra credit.
- The cast of the children's TV series Rainbow acted out the story in a 1987 episode. Zippy played the title character, Geoffrey played the king, Rod played the miller, Bungle played the miller's daughter, George played the baby, Jane played the maid, and Freddy played a peasant.
- The video game Paper Mario: The Thousand-Year Door has a similar format with the character of Doopliss inspired by Rumpelstiltskin, in which the player has to guess his name correctly, but can only do so by finding the "p" in a chest underground. This reference is more direct in the original Japanese version and other translations, in which the character is named "Rumpel".
- In a Courage the Cowardly Dog episode "Rumpledkiltskin", a Scottish man lures Courage and Muriel to his castle by posing as Muriel's great uncle and forces her to make 5,000 kilts so he can profit them. In order to escape, Courage arranges a game of charades with him to guess his real name to earn their freedom, to which Courage won. Admitting his defeat and feeling humiliated by his name, Muriel suggest he should change his name to "Rumpelstiltskin", which he happily accepts and offers her to be business partners.
- In Happily N'Ever After, Rumpelstiltskin successfully steals the miller's daughter baby and assist Cinderella's evil stepmother Frieda after she tampers with the Scales of Good and Evil. He appears again in the sequel where he helps Lady Vain to ruin Snow White's reputation by giving her an apple that makes her publicly say bad things to everyone in her kingdom.

=== Theater ===
- Utz-li-Gutz-li, a 1965 Israeli stage musical written by Avraham Shlonsky
- Rumpelstiltskin, a 2011 American stage musical

== Citations ==
=== Bibliography ===
- Bergler, Edmund (1961). "The Clinical Importance of "Rumpelstiltskin" As Anti-Male Manifesto". American Imago. 18 (1): 65–70. ISSN 0065-860X. JSTOR 26301733.
- Marshall, Howard W. (1973). "'Tom Tit Tot'. A Comparative Essay on Aarne-Thompson Type 500. The Name of the Helper". Folklore. 84 (1): 51–57. doi:10.1080/0015587X.1973.9716495. ISSN 0015-587X. JSTOR 1260436.
- Ní Dhuibhne, Éilis (2012). "The Name of the Helper: "Kinder- und Hausmärchen" and Ireland". Béaloideas. 80: 1–22. ISSN 0332-270X. JSTOR 24862867.
- Rand, Harry (2000). "Who was Rupelstiltskin?". The International Journal of Psychoanalysis. 81 (5): 943–962. PMID 11109578.
- Rand, Harry (2019). Rumpelstiltskin's Secret: What Women Didn't Tell the Grimms. Routledge. ISBN 9781351204149.
- von Sydow, Carl W. (1909). Två spinnsagor: en studie i jämförande folksagoforskning (in Swedish). Stockholm: P.A. Norstedt. [Analysis of Aarne-Thompson-Uther tale types 500 and 501]
- Yolen, Jane (1993). "Foreword: The Rumpelstiltskin Factor". Journal of the Fantastic in the Arts. 5 (2 (18)): 11–13. ISSN 0897-0521. JSTOR 43308148.
- Zipes, Jack (1993). "Spinning with Fate: Rumpelstiltskin and the Decline of Female Productivity". Western Folklore. 52 (1): 43–60. doi:10.2307/1499492. ISSN 0043-373X. JSTOR 1499492.
- T., A. W.; Clodd, Edward (1889). "The Philosophy of Rumpelstilt-Skin". The Folk-Lore Journal. 7 (2): 135–163. ISSN 1744-2524. JSTOR 1252656.

=== Further reading ===
- Cambon, Fernand (1976). "La fileuse. Remarques psychanalytiques sur le motif de la "fileuse" et du "filage" dans quelques poèmes et contes allemands". Littérature. 23 (3): 56–74. doi:10.3406/litt.1976.1122.
- Dvořák, Karel (1967). "AaTh 500 in deutschen Varianten aus der Tschechoslowakei". Fabula (in German). 9 (1–3): 100–104. doi:10.1515/fabl.1967.9.1-3.100.
- Paulme, Denise. "Thème et variations: l'épreuve du «nom inconnu» dans les contes d'Afrique noire". In: Cahiers d'études africaines, vol. 11, n°42, 1971. pp. 189–205. DOI: Thème et variations : l'épreuve du « nom inconnu » dans les contes d'Afrique noire.; www.persee.fr/doc/cea_0008-0055_1971_num_11_42_2800
