= Tabula =

Tabula may refer to:

- Tabula, Inc., a semiconductor company (2003–2015)
- Tabula (game), an ancient Greco-Roman board game
- Tabula (magazine), a Georgian news periodical (since 2010)
- Tabula ansata, a stone tablet with handles

== See also ==
- Tabula Rasa (disambiguation)
