= Rumpel (disambiguation) =

Rumpel is a card game.

Rumpel may also refer to:

- Rümpel, a municipality in Schleswig-Holstein, Germany

== People with the surname ==
- George Rumpel (manufacturer) (1850–1916), Canadian politician
- George Rumpel (1901–1983), Canadian wrestler
- Theodor Rumpel (surgeon) (1862–1923), German surgeon
- Theodor Rumpel (aviator) (1897–?), German flying ace

== See also ==
- Rumpelstiltskin (disambiguation)
