= Tabula Rasa (disambiguation) =

Tabula rasa ("blank slate") is a philosophical concept.

Tabula Rasa may also refer to:

== Film and television ==
- Tabula Rasa (film), a 2014 Indonesian film
- Tabula Rasa (TV series), a Dutch show
- "Tabula Rasa", an episode of Absentia
- "Tabula Rasa" (Buffy the Vampire Slayer)
- "Tabula Rasa" (Heroes)
- "Tabula Rasa" (Lost)
- "Tabula Rasa" (Stargate Atlantis)
- "Tabula Rasa," a Criminal Minds episode
- "Tabula Rasa," a Justice League episode
- "Tabula Rasa," a Law & Order episode

== Music ==
- Tabula Rasā, a collaborative album featuring Béla Fleck, Vishwa Mohan Bhatt, and Jie-Bing Chen
- Tabula Rasa (Bloodbound album)
- Tabula Rasa (Brymo album)
- Tabula Rasa (Einstürzende Neubauten album)
- Tabula Rasa (Arvo Pärt), piece for Two Violins, string orchestra and prepared piano.
- Tabula Rasa (Finnish band), a Finnish rock group
- Tabula Rasa (Pittsburgh band), an American post-hardcore math-rock band
- "Tabula Rasa", a song by Covenant on the 1996 album Sequencer
- "Tabula Rasa", a 1998 song by Freundeskreis
- "Tabula Rasa", a song by Sinch on their 2002 album Sinch
- "Tabula Rasa", a song by Björk on the 2017 album Utopia
- III: Tabula Rasa or Death and the Seven Pillars, a 2013 album by The Devil's Blood
- "Tabula Rasa", a song by Earl Sweatshirt on the 2021 album Sick!
- Tabula Rasa, a group that included American indie duo Magdalena Bay

== Other media ==
- Tabula Rasa, a 2010 novel in Hebrew by Nathan Shaham
- Tabula Rasa (video game), a 2007 online roleplaying game
- An area in the 2000 video game Star Trek: New Worlds

== See also ==
- Blank pad rule, a legal rule
- Blank slate (disambiguation)
- Carte blanche (disambiguation)
