= Blank slate (disambiguation) =

Blank slate is the epistemological thesis that individual human beings are born with no built-in mental content.

Blank slate may also refer to:

- "Blank Slate" (The Outer Limits), a 1999 television episode
- The Blank Slate by Steven Pinker, a 2002 psychology book
- Blank Slate (manga), a 2005 manga written and illustrated by Aya Kanno
- Blank Slate, a 2008 thriller television film directed by John Harrison
- Blank Slate Books, a UK-based publisher of comics and graphic novels
- Blank Slate, a 2024 game show airing on Game Show Network

== See also ==
- Tabula Rasa (disambiguation)
- Blank pad rule, legal doctrine and metaphor
