= Avraham Shlonsky =

Russian-born Israeli and editor (1900–1973)

- אברהם שלונסקי
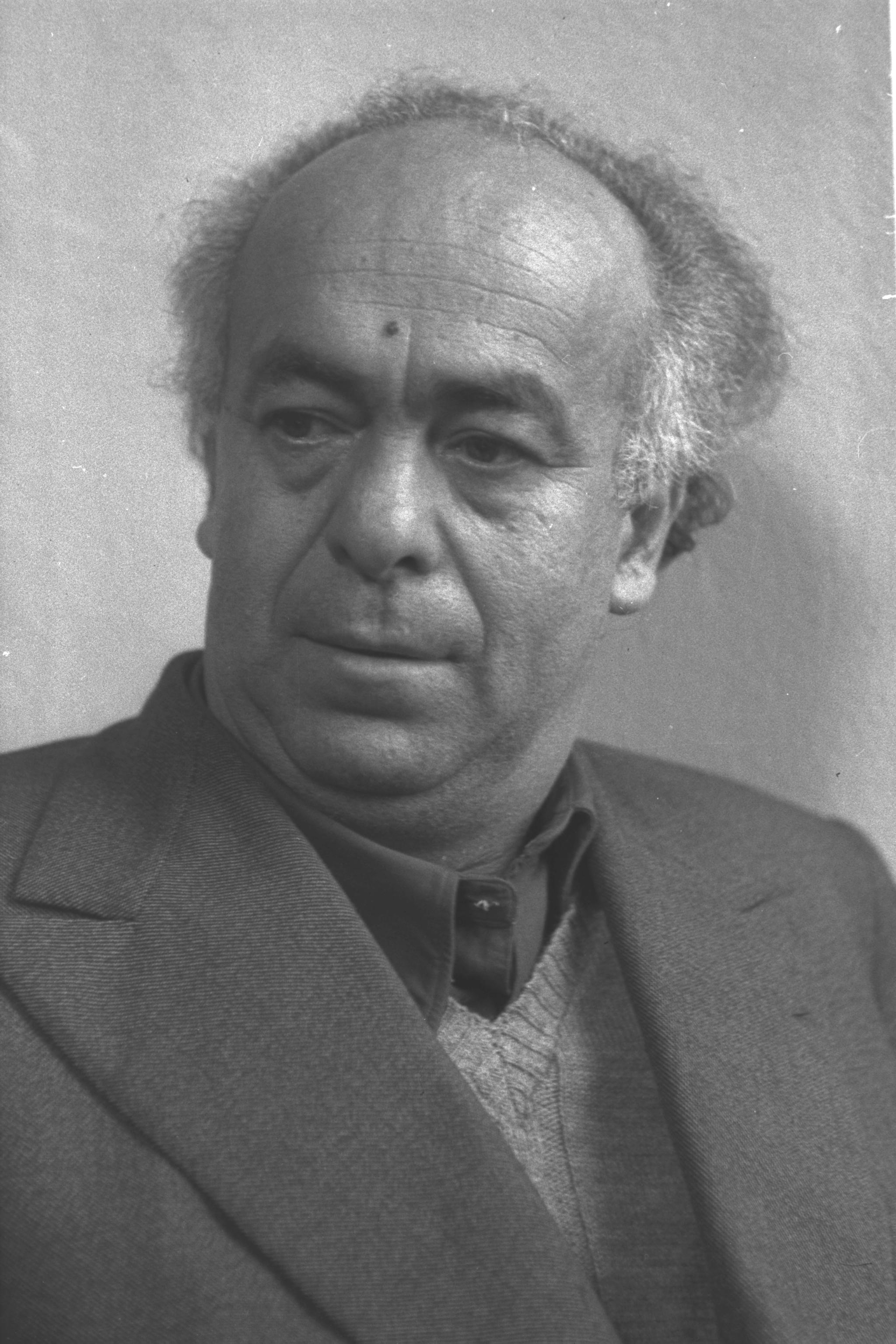
- Shlonsky in 1952
- Born: March 6, 1900; Kryukovo, Poltava Governorate, Russian Empire
- Died: May 18, 1973 (aged 73); Tel Aviv, Israel
- Citizenship: Israel (from 1948)
- Occupations: Poet; writer; playwright; translator; educator
- Spouse(s): Lucia Laykin; Mira Horvitz
- Writing career
- Literary movement: Established the Yakhdav group (Hebrew symbolism)

Avraham Shlonsky (Hebrew: אברהם שלונסקי; Russian: Авраам Шлёнский, romanized: Avraam Shlyonsky; March 6, 1900 – May 18, 1973) was a Russian-born Israeli poet and editor.

He was influential in the development of modern Hebrew and its literature in Israel through his many acclaimed translations of literary classics, particularly from Russian, as well as his own original Hebrew children's classics. Known for his humor, Shlonsky earned the nickname "Lashonsky" from the wisecrackers of his generation (lashon means "tongue", i.e., "language") for his unusually clever and astute innovations in the newly evolving Hebrew language.

== Biography ==
Avraham Shlonsky was born into a Hasidic family in Kryukovo, in Poltava Governorate of the Russian Empire (now a part of Kremenchuk in Ukraine). His father, Tuvia, was a Chabad Hasid, and his mother, Tzippora, was a Russian revolutionary. When she was pregnant with her sixth child, she hid illegal posters on her body. Five-year-old Avraham informed on his mother, leading to her arrest. Four of his siblings were prodigies. His younger sister was composer and pianist Verdina Shlonsky. In 1913, when Shlonsky was 13, he was sent to Ottoman Palestine to study at the prestigious Herzliya Hebrew High School in Tel Aviv. When the First World War broke out, he returned to Ukraine.

In 1921, the whole family moved to Mandatory Palestine. Tuvia Shlonsky worked as a warehouse manager and bookkeeper in the Shemen factory in Haifa. Avraham was a manual laborer, paving roads and working in construction along with other members of the Third Aliyah. He joined Gdud Ha'avoda and helped to establish Kibbutz Ein Harod in the Jezreel Valley. He married Lucia but conducted a secret affair with Mira Horowitz, the wife of a friend and colleague, with whom he had a child in 1936.

Avraham Shlonsky died in Tel Aviv in 1973.

== Literary career ==
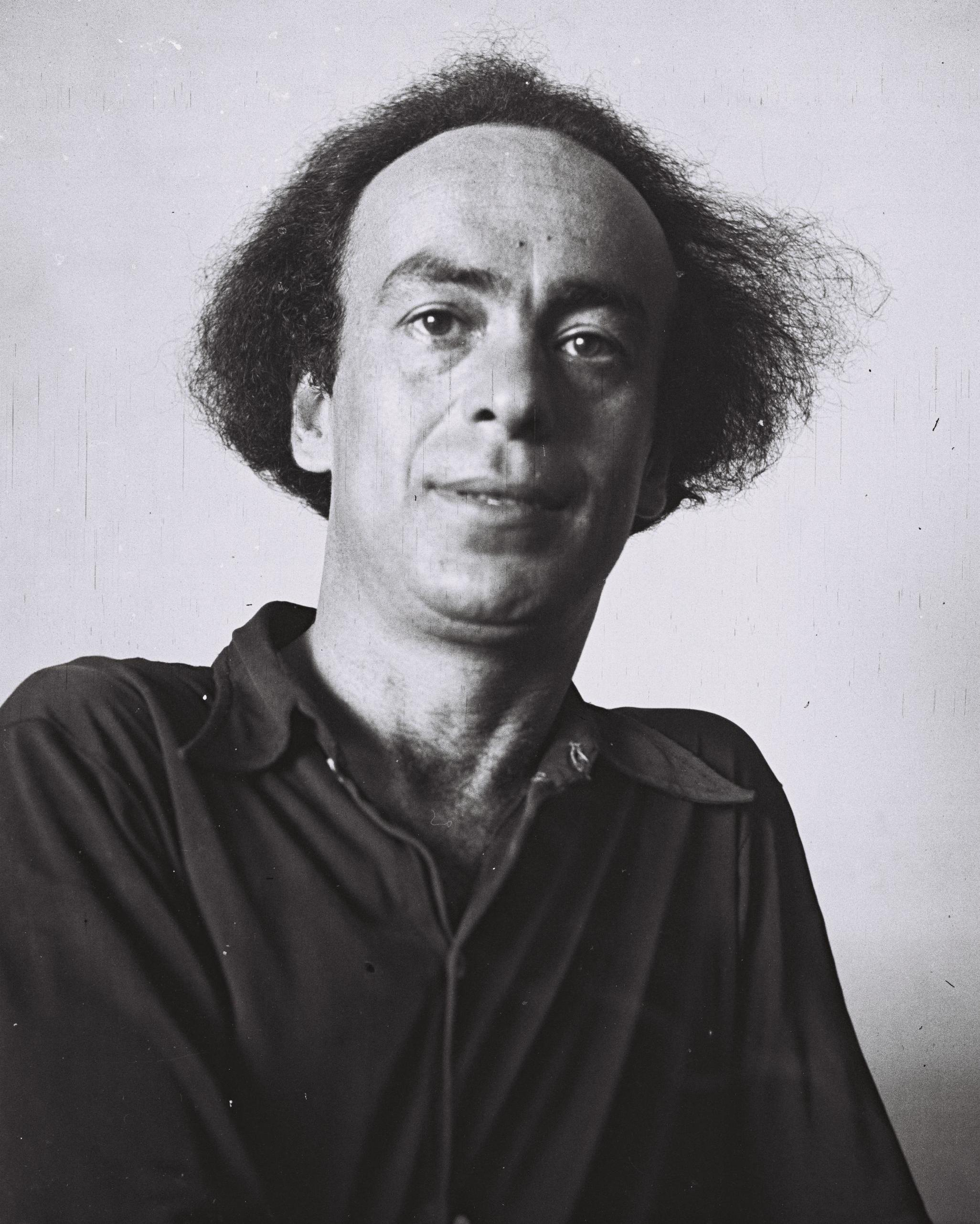
Avraham Shlonsky, 1936

Shlonsky published his first poem in 1919 in the newspaper Ha-Shiloah. He contributed to Jewish cultural life with songs for satirical stage productions, as well as the Purim holiday costume balls that were a tradition in early Tel Aviv. Even at this early stage in his career as a poet, he showed a tendency for witty writing, incorporating linguistic innovations in the revived and developing Hebrew language. During this period, he edited the literary columns of several newspapers.

Gradually, he became the representative of the "rebel" group that rebelled against the poetry of Bialik and his generation, expressing a particular aversion to what was seen as their characteristic clichés. The new group tried to create a vibrant, youthful, lively poetry, and not perpetuate what they saw as being something second-hand from the literary establishment. For years, perhaps as a result of this stance, Shlonsky's poetry was not taught in schools alongside the classic poems of Bialik, Shaul Tchernichovsky, David Shimoni, and others.

In 1933 Shlonsky founded the literary weekly Turim, which was identified with the "Yachdav" society in which major poets Natan Alterman and Leah Goldberg were also members. As an editor, Shlonsky gave aspiring poets an opportunity to publish their poems. Dahlia Ravikovitch merited one such opportunity when her first poem was published in the literary quarterly Orlogin edited by Shlonsky.

Shlonsky was noted for his sensitive activism on behalf of Boris Gaponov. Gaponov, as editor of the Communist Party daily in an auto plant in Soviet Georgia, translated the Georgian epic The Knight in the Panther's Skin by Shota Rustaveli into Hebrew. Shlonsky orchestrated the publication of this translation in Israel, and was among those who worked to enable Gaponov to immigrate to Israel. When Gaponov, who had learned Hebrew by listening to Israel Radio broadcasts, finally immigrated to Israel he was already very ill and close to death. Israeli television viewers of the time remember the image of Shlonsky stroking Gaponov's head in a loving, fatherly manner, as the latter lay on his sickbed.

Despite his reputation for comic wit, Shlonsky did not shrink from the tragic situation around him, but rather expressed it in his works. In the poem "Distress" he laments the fate of the victims of the First World War and of the Jews who suffered from pogroms in Ukraine during the Bolshevik revolution.

During the Holocaust, he published a collection of verse titled ממחשכים (From Concealing Shadows) in which he expressed his feelings from that darkest period in human history. He particularly lamented the fate of the Jews in a diseased Europe.

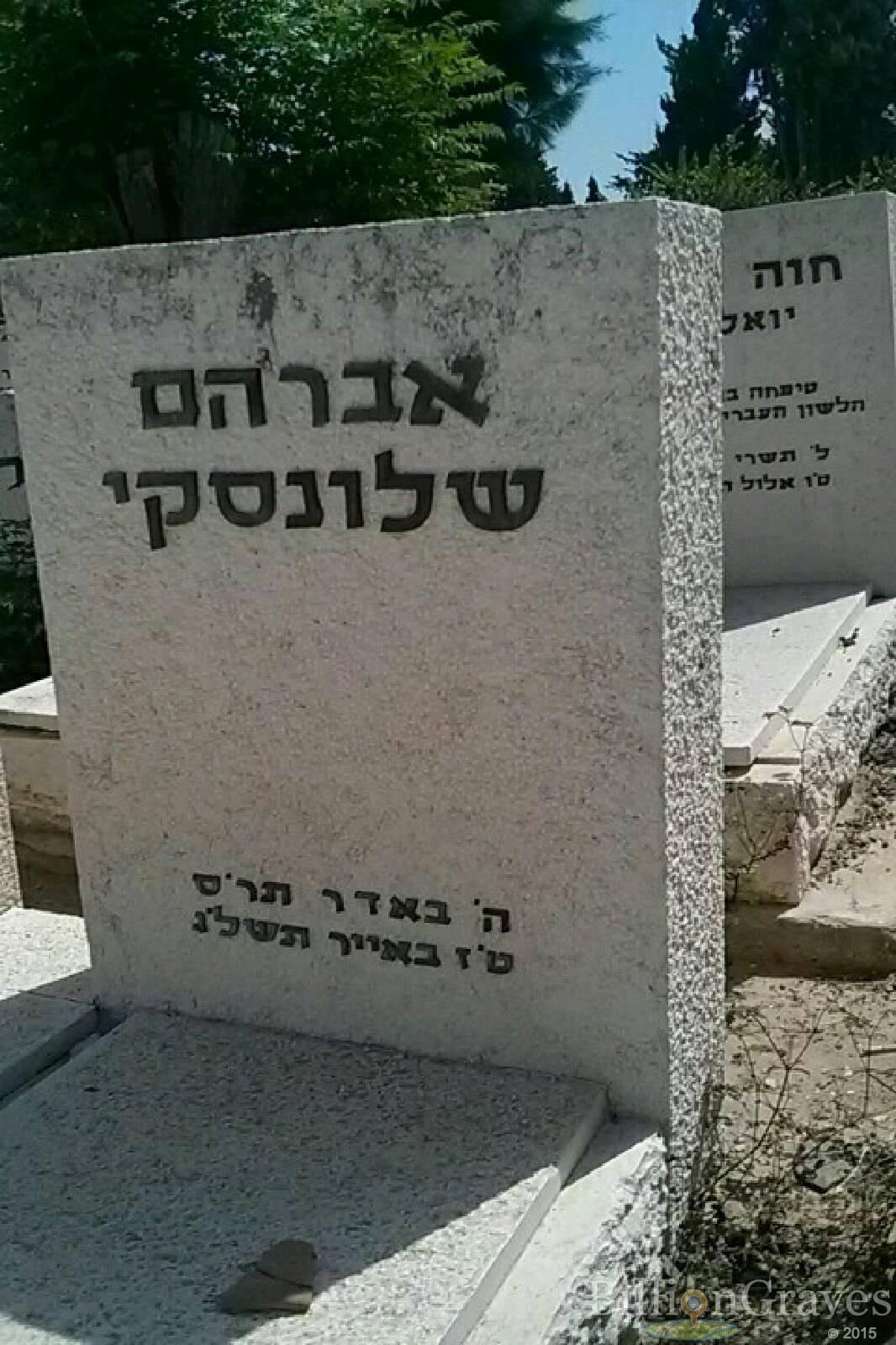
Shlonsky's headstone in the Writers' Section at Kiryat Shaul cemetery, beside that of Nathan Alterman

== Awards ==
- In 1946, Shlonsky received the Tchernichovsky Prize for exemplary translation, for his translations of the novel Eugene Onegin by Alexander Pushkin and the play Hamlet by Shakespeare.
- In 1959, he was awarded the Bialik Prize for literature (jointly with Eliezer Steinman).
- In 1967, he was awarded the Israel Prize, for literature.

== Works ==
His collection of verse Rough Stones exemplifies his work as a mature poet. Poems from the Long Corridor is a collection of reflections on the nature of life and death.

Shlonsky is also considered among the finest Hebrew children's poets, for books such as Mickey Who? and Me and Tali in Lhama Country.

The play Utzli-Gutzli, about the dwarf Rumpelstiltskin of German legend, became a classic among Hebrew children's plays. In Shlonsky's translation for the stage, all of the monologues and dialogues are spoken in rhyme. They incorporate sophisticated wordplay using the Hebrew language at a high level. The following example from Utzli-Gutzli is presented with a transliteration, placing accents on stressed syllables. An unauthorized translation follows.

yed`ú kol ir, kol kfar vapélekh:	יֵדְעוּ כָּל עִיר, כָּל כְּפָר וָפֶלֶךְ:
reishít chokhmá – misím lamélekh!	רֵאשִׁית חָכְמָה – מִסִּים לַמֶּלֶךְ!
misím, misím, ve`ód misím –	מִסִּים, מִסִּים וְעוֹד מִסִּים –
ve-éyn chasím al hakisím!	וְאֵין חָסִים עַל הַכִּיסִים!

Every city, province, town, learn the first rule: pay the crown!
Tax and tariff, fee and fare, not a pocket shall you spare!

In his translations of foreign-language works, Avraham Shlonsky developed a distinctive style that is identifiable across his work and has been noted by readers and critics of Hebrew literature. He translated a range of well-known authors, including William Shakespeare, Anton Chekhov, Nikolai Gogol, Romain Rolland, and others.

In his distinguished translation of Hamlet, which a score of Hebrew translators had already tackled, Shlonsky's distinctive language is again evident. He translated Shakespeare from Russian, as he was not a master of English. Yet translating at second hand did not mar the quality of his result. When Hamlet tells his mother Gertrude not to sleep with his uncle Claudius, who murdered his father, Shlonsky uses the consonance min`i dodayikh midodi: "withhold your love from my uncle", where the unusual word dodayikh (your love) evokes the Song of Solomon. The conventional translation is al ta`ali al yetzu`ei dodi (do not go upon my uncle's couch).

=== Individual poems ===
- "Toil" (1928)

== Selected puns attributed ==
- When some firm-breasted young women passed by, he let slip, "Here's the latest, leading with the top story" (in literal translation, here's the news / new women, chief part foremost).
- On the Matate Theater: "the bit of tea (me`at ha-te) left over from the kettle" (kumkum, the name of the previous theater).
- To a lass who wanted to present him with a flower (perach): "I'll gladly accept your soft mouth (pe rakh)!" When she tried to explain that she meant -rach with a chet (the letter of the Hebrew alphabet), he replied "I'll take the sin (the word chet) upon myself!" (an allusion to Romeo and Juliet, Act I, Scene 5).

== Selected coinages attributed ==
- derekh-agav (intentional misspelling of the original phrase, meaning 'by the way'; in Shlonsky's version, it means 'the way of longing'): flirt.
- someone who goes around with a transistor radio glued to one ear: radiot.
- being cheated on by a woman for the first time: keren hayesod. The phrase, literally "The Foundation Fund", is the Hebrew name of the United Israel Appeal. But the word keren (fund) can also mean "horn" as in cuckoldry—or as in the horned Moses of art history.
- being cheated on by a woman habitually: keren kayemet (the Jewish National Fund, where kayemet means "enduring").
- the Ararat (אררט) café in early Tel Aviv, where penniless writers gathered: It's an acronym for "Ani Rotze Rak Te (אני רוצה רק תה, I only want tea)." (Misspelled)
- the eagerness of literary folk for prizes: prize-titution (prastitutzia).

== See also ==
- List of Israel Prize recipients
- List of Bialik Prize recipients
