= Deliberation =

Process of thoughtfully weighing options, usually prior to voting

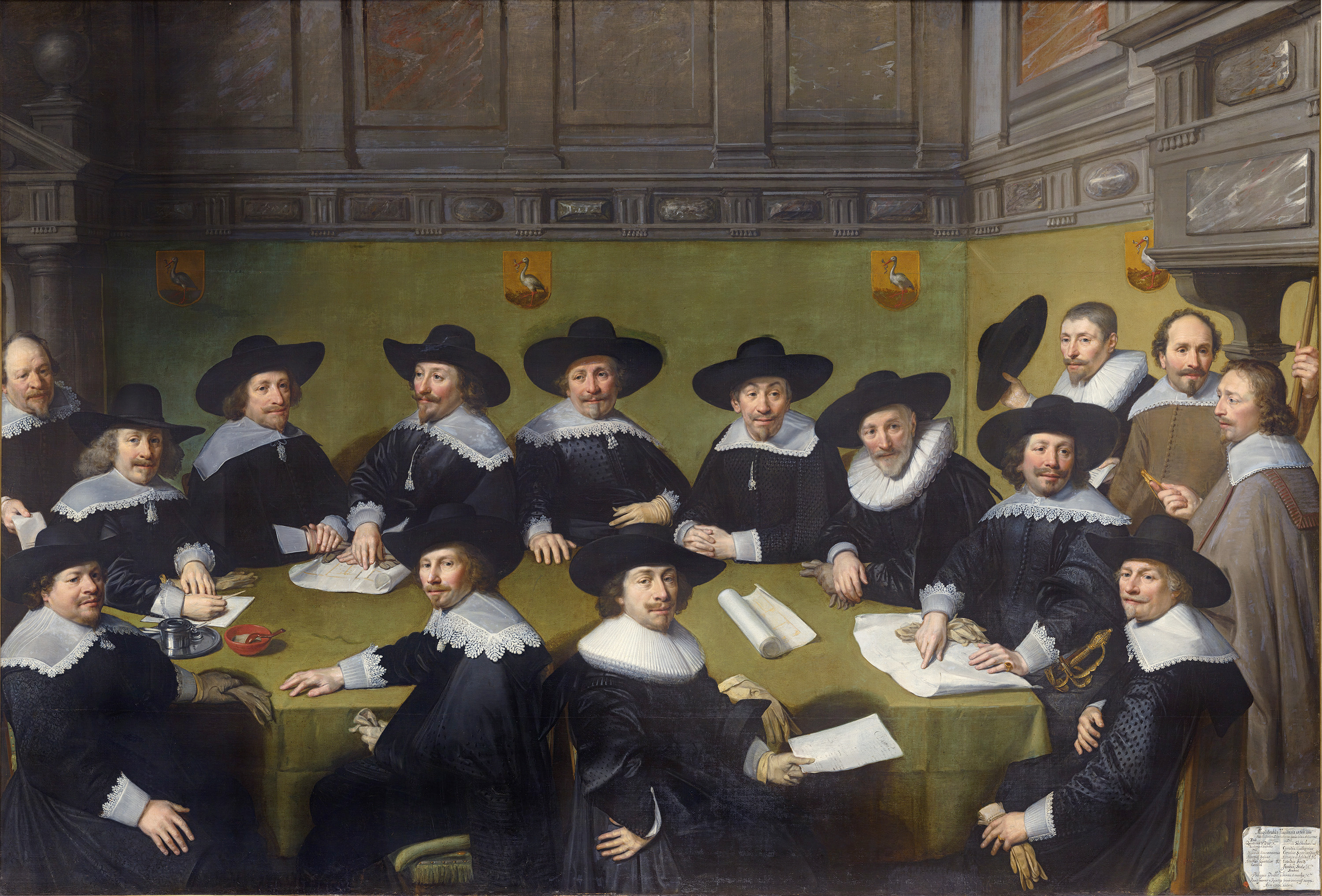
The city council of The Hague deliberating in 1636

Deliberation is a process of thoughtfully exchanging and weighing options, for example prior to voting. Deliberation emphasizes the use of logic and reason as opposed to power-struggle, creativity, or dialogue. Deliberation ideally entails that the merits of an argument are considered, rather than the standing of the arguer.

Group decisions are generally made after deliberation through a vote or consensus of those involved.

In legal settings a jury famously uses deliberation because it is given specific options, like guilty or not guilty, along with information and arguments to evaluate. In "deliberative democracy", the aim is for both elected officials and the general public to use deliberation rather than power-struggle as the basis for their vote. Citizens' assemblies and mini-publics are examples of deliberative democratic institutions.

Individual deliberation is also a description of day-to-day rational decision-making, and as such is an epistemic virtue.

== Trial juries ==
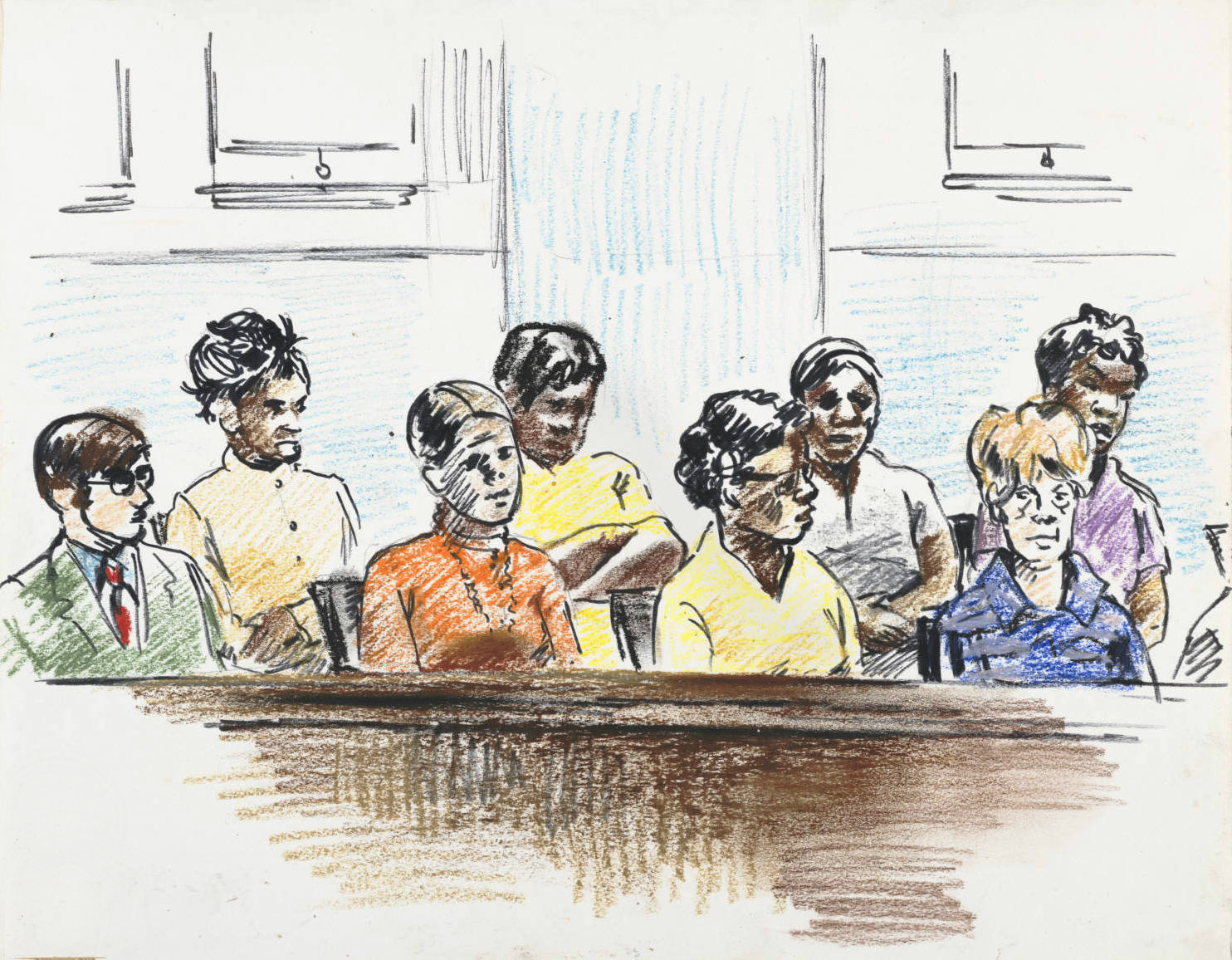
A jury

In countries with a jury system, the jury's deliberation in criminal matters can involve both rendering a verdict and determining the appropriate sentence. In civil cases, the jury decision is whether to agree with the plaintiff or the defendant and rendering a resolution binding actions by the parties based on the results of the trial.

Typically, a jury must come to a unanimous decision before it delivers a verdict; however, there are exceptions. When a jury does not reach a unanimous decision and does not feel it is possible to do so, they declare themselves a "hung jury", a mistrial is declared, and the trial will have to be redone at the discretion of the plaintiff or prosecutor.

One of the most famous dramatic depictions of this phase of a trial in practice is the film 12 Angry Men.

== In political philosophy ==
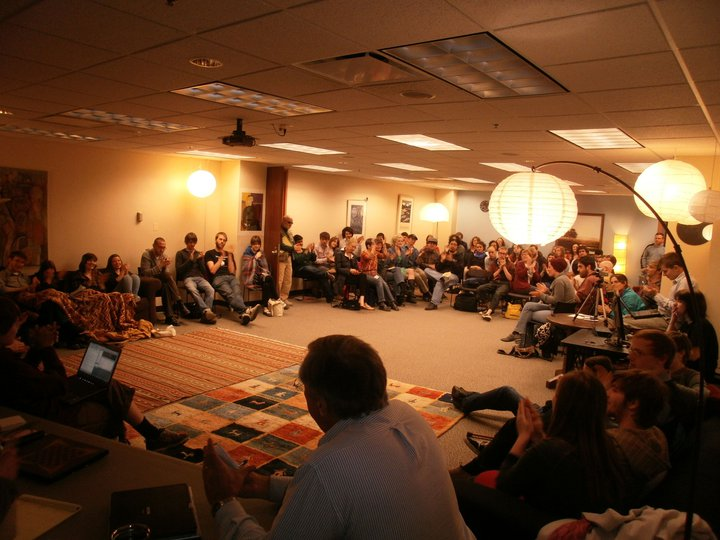
Shimer College Assembly deliberation

In political philosophy, there is a wide range of views regarding how political deliberation becomes possible within particular governmental regimes. Political philosophy embraces deliberation alternatively as a crucial component or as the death-knell of democratic systems. Contemporary democratic theory contrasts democracy with authoritarian regimes. This leads to differing definitions of deliberation within political philosophy. In a broad sense, deliberation involves interaction guided by specific norms, rules, or boundaries. Deliberative ideals often include "face-to-face discussion, the implementation of good public policy, decision making competence, and critical mass."

The origins of philosophical interest in deliberation can be traced to Aristotle's concept of phronesis, understood as "prudence" or "practical wisdom", and its exercise by individuals who deliberate in order to discern the positive or negative consequences of potential actions.

Many modern political philosophers believe that strict norms, rules, or fixed boundaries either in how subjects eligible for political deliberation are formed (John Rawls) or in the types of qualifying arguments (Jürgen Habermas) can hinder deliberation and render it unfeasible.

"Existential deliberation" is a term introduced by emotional public sphere theorists. They argue that political deliberation is an inherent state, not a deployable process. Therefore, deliberation is infrequent and possibly occurs only in face-to-face interactions. This concept aligns with radical deliberation insights, suggesting that politics emerges sporadically as potential within an otherwise inert social environment.

"Pragmatic deliberation" represents the epistemic variation of existential deliberation, focusing on assisting groups in achieving positive outcomes that both aggregate and reshape the perspectives of the affected public.

Advocates of "public deliberation" as an essential democratic practice focus on processes of inclusiveness and interaction in making political decisions. The validity and reliability of public opinion improve with the development of "public judgment" as citizens consider multiple perspectives, weigh possible options, and accept the outcomes of decisions made together.

=== Radical deliberation ===
Radical deliberation refers to a philosophical view of deliberation inspired by the events of the student revolution in May 1968. It aligns with political theories of radical democracy from figures like Michel Foucault, Ernesto Laclau, Chantal Mouffe, Jacques Rancière, and Alain Badiou. These theories emphasize political deliberation as a means of engaging diverse perspectives, setting the stage for political possibilities. In their view, radical democracy remains open-ended and susceptible to changes beyond individual influence. Instead, it's shaped by the discourse resulting from contingent gatherings within larger political entities.

Michel Foucault employs "technologies of discourse" and "mechanisms of power" to explain how deliberation can be hindered or emerge through discourse technologies that give a semblance of agency by reproducing power dynamics among individuals. The concept of "mechanisms" or "technologies" presents a paradox. On one hand, these technologies are intertwined with the subjects who utilize them. On the other, discussing the coordinating machine or technology implies an infrastructure organizing society collectively. This notion suggests distancing individuals from the means of their organization, offering a god's-eye view of the social that is coordinated by the movement of its parts.

Chantal Mouffe employs "the democratic paradox" to establish a self-sustaining political model founded on inherent contradictions. These unresolved contradictions fuel productive tensions among subjects who acknowledge each other's right to speak. According to Mouffe, the only stable political foundation is the configuration of the social and the certainty of a penultimate articulation's deferral. This signifies that societal re-articulations will persist. Here, process prevails over content: the liberal/popular sovereignty paradox propels radical democracy. The rhetorical gesture of the foundational paradox functions as a mechanism—an interface connecting human and language machinery, fostering the conditions for ongoing reconfiguration: a positive feedback loop within politics.

Chantal Mouffe and Jacques Rancière hold contrasting views regarding the conditions of politics. For Mouffe, it involves internal rearrangements of existing social structures through "articulations". Conversely, Rancière sees it as the intrusion of an unaccounted-for externality. In the realm of political "arithmetical/geometric" distinctions, there's a clear nod to mechanics or mathematics. Politics endures by perpetuating a dynamic between homeostasis and reconfiguration, akin to what N. Katherine Hayles terms "pattern" and "randomness". This cycle relies on counting what's within the police order. The political mechanism facilitates future reconfigurations by adding new elements, reshaping the social fabric, and then returning to equilibrium, ensuring the perpetuity of an incomplete "whole". Once more, it's a rhetorical paradox driving politics—a foundational arbitrariness in determining who can speak and who can't.

=== Other theorists ===
- Giorgio Agamben – Italian philosopher (born 1942)
- Hannah Arendt – German and American historian and philosopher (1906–1975)
- Lauren Berlant – American academic and author (1957–2021)
- Bonnie Honig – American political theorist (born 1959)
- Bruno Latour – French philosopher, anthropologist and sociologist (1947–2022)

== See also ==
- Argument map – Visual representation of the structure of an argument
- Blank pad rule – American legal doctrine and metaphor
- Dialogue mapping – Argumentation scheme
- Low-information rationality – Psychological problem-solving tendency
- Online deliberation
