= Nathan Shaham =

Israeli writer

Nathan Shaham נתן שחם
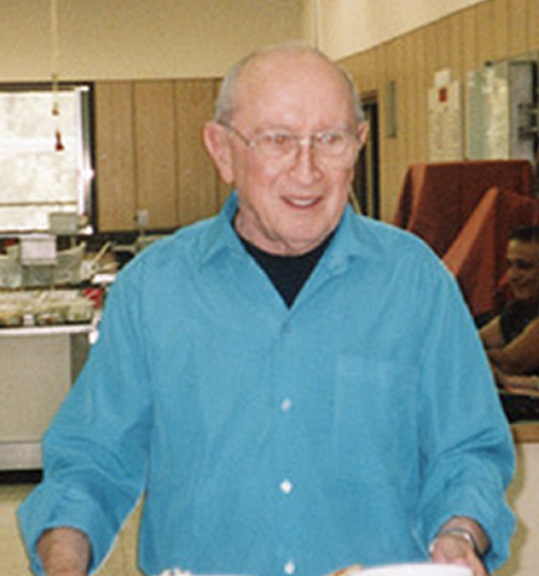
- Shaham in Beit Alfa, Nov. 2000
- Born: January 29, 1925; Tel Aviv, Mandatory Palestine
- Died: June 18, 2018 (aged 93); Beit Alfa, Israel
- Occupations: Writer, novelist and playwright
- Writing career
- Notable awards: Bialik Prize (1988); National Jewish Book Award (1992); Newman Prize (1993); ADAI-WIZO Prize (2005); Prime Minister's Prize (2007); Israel Prize (2012)

Nathan Shaham (Hebrew: נתן שחם; January 29, 1925 – June 18, 2018) was an Israeli writer.

== Biography ==
Born in Tel Aviv, Shaham was a member of Kibbutz Beit Alfa from 1945-2018, and served with the Palmach in the 1948 Arab-Israeli War. He was the son of Eliezer Steinman, the Hebrew author and essayist.

Shaham was editor-in-chief of Sifriat Poalim Publishing House. He was Israel's cultural attaché in the United States from 1977–80, and a former vice-chairman of the Israel Broadcasting Authority.

He died in his home in Beit Alfa on June 18, 2018.

== Awards ==
Shaham was the winner of several literary awards, including the Bialik Prize (1988), the National Jewish Book Award for Fiction for Rosendorf Quartet (1992), the Newman Prize (1993), the ADAI-WIZO Prize for The Rosendorf Quartet (Italy, 2005), and the Prime Minister's Prize (2007).

In 2012, he won the Israel Prize for Hebrew Literature and Poetry; the prize jury called Shaham one of the outstanding authors of Israel’s generation of founders and noted the “lively and rich” style of his plays, fiction and nonfiction works.

== Works ==
- Grain and Lead (novel), Sifriat Poalim, 1948 [Dagan Ve-Oferet]
- The Gods Are Lazy (novel), Sifriat Poalim, 1949 [Ha-Elim Atzelim]
- They'll Arrive Tomorrow (play), Sifriat Poalim, 1949 [Hem Yagyu Mahar]
- Call Me Siomka (play), Sifriat Poalim, 1950 [Kra Li Siomka]
- "Yohanan Bar Hama" (play), 1952
- Always Us (novel), Sifriat Poalim, 1952 [Tamid Anahnu]
- A Stone on the Well's Mouth (novel), Sifriat Poalim, 1956 [Even Al Pi Ha-Be'er]
- "Meetings in Moscow" (non-fiction), 1957
- Veterans' Housing (stories), Sifriat Poalim, 1958 [Shikun Vatikim]
- The Wisdom of the Poor (novel), Sifriat Poalim, 1960 [Hochmat Ha-Misken]
- Citrus Scent (novel), Sifriat Poalim, 1962 [Reyah Hadarim]
- The Journey to the Land of Kush (travel), Massada, 1962 [Masah Le-Eretz Kush]
- "That's Because" (children), Sifriat Poalim, 1964
- The Book of Portraits, Sifriat Poalim, 1968 [Sefer ha-Diokanaot]
- First Person Plural (novel), Sifriat Poalim, 1968 [Guf Rishon Rabim]
- Round Trip (novel), Am Oved, 1972 [Haloch Ve-Shov]
- Witness for the King (novel), Am Oved, 1975 [Ed Ha-Melech]
- Talk to the Wind (novel), Sifriat Poalim, 1975 [Daber El Ha-Ruah]
- The Other Side of the Wall (novellas), Am Oved, 1978 [Kirot Etz Dakim]
- Green Autumn (stories), Sifriat Poalim, 1979 [Stav Yarok]
- Bone to the Bone (novel), Am Oved, 1981 [Etzem El Atzmo]
- Still Silent Voice (novel), Sifriat Poalim, 1983 [Demamah Dakah]
- Mountain and Home (non-fiction), Sifriat Poalim, 1984 [Ha-Har Ve Ha-Bayit]
- The Streets of Ashkelon (novellas), Am Oved, 1985 [Hutzot Ashkelon]
- Four in One Bar, Hakibbutz Hameuchad, 1987 [Arba Be-Teivah Ahat]
- The Rosendorf Quartet (novel), Am Oved, 1987 [Reviyat Rosendorf]. English translation Avalon Travel Publishing, 2000, ISBN 978-0-8021-3316-8
- Sealed Book, Sifriat Poalim, 1988 [Sefer Hatum]
- They'll Arrive Tomorrow (play), Or-Am, 1989 [Hem Yagyu Mahar]
- New Account (play), Or-Am, 1989 [Heshbon Hadash]
- The Desert Generation (non-fiction), Sifriat Poalim, 1991 [Dor Ha-Midbar]
- Series (novel), Am Oved, 1992 [Sidra]
- Hot Dogs (stories), Sifriat Poalim, 1993 [Naknikiot Hamot]
- The Heart of Tel Aviv (novel), Am Oved, 1996 [Lev Tel Aviv]
- Expect a Letter (stories), Sifriat Poalim, 1999 [Michtav Ba-Derech]
- Rosendorf's Shadow (novel), Am Oved, 2001 [Tzilo Shel Rosendorf]
- Tabula Rasa [Zmora-Bitan, 2010] (Hebrew: לוח חלק)

== See also ==
- List of Bialik Prize recipients
