= Toil (Shlonsky poem) =

"Toil" (Hebrew: עָמָל Amal) is a 1928 poem by Avraham Shlonsky. The poem forms part of a sequence named after Mount Gilboa. and reflects the author's life six years after his arrival in Palestine, while working on paving roads with other members of the Third Aliyah. The poem begins "We have a small hand with five fingers, Wax fingers thin to breaking. The pulse beats at their beginning and at their end—fingernails." The poem is celebrated for its re-imagining of the religious imagery of Judaism in terms of the settlers' Zionist pioneer construction ethic. An example is found in how prayer shawls and phylacteries are used as metaphors to describe the emotions of the pioneers as they build roads: "Dress me, good mother, in a glorious robe of many colors, ..." In the poem "toil" becomes a form of worship itself, or, per Chowers (2012), "an altar at which to worship".

== Translations ==
The poem has been translated into English several times:

- Rebecca Mintz, Modern Hebrew Poetry: A Bilingual Anthology (1966).
- Leah Goldberg "Al arba'a shirim shel A. Shlonsky" [Four poems by A. Shlonsky], Moznayim.38.5-6 (1974)
- T. Carmi, The Penguin Book of Hebrew Verse (New York: Penguin, 1991)
