= Eliezer Steinman =

Eliezer Steinman אליעזר שטיינמן
- Born: December 1891; Obodówka, Podolian Governorate, Russian Empire
- Died: August 7, 1970 (aged 78); Tel Aviv, Israel
- Citizenship: Israeli
- Writing career
- Language: Hebrew and Yiddish
- Notable awards: Bialik Prize (1959); Israel Prize (1963)

Eliezer Steinman (Hebrew: אליעזר שטיינמן; born 1891, died 7 August 1970) was a Russian-born Israeli writer, journalist and editor.

== Biography ==
Steinman was born in December 1891 in Obodówka, part of the Sobański estate, a village in the Podolia Governorate of the Russian Empire, later part of Poland after World War I, now Obodivka in Ukraine. In his youth, while studying in Chişinău to obtain semikhah to become a rabbi, he began to publish his first stories. Starting in 1910, his works, in Yiddish and Hebrew, began to appear in newspapers such as "Rashaphim", "Ha-Shiluach" and "Ha-Tsefirah" and he earned a living by teaching. During those years, he became associated with David Frischmann and Hayim Nahman Bialik, who worked to obtain his release from service in the Imperial Russian Army.

In 1917, following the Bolshevik Revolution, he adopted a communist ideology and asked to be allowed to develop Hebrew culture. He moved to Moscow and began to work for the Shtiebal publishing house and published his first novel. In 1919, he moved to Odessa and published the pamphlet "The Hebrew Communist". From 1920, Steinman was one of the regular writers for "Ha-Tsefirah" and for the Yiddush newspaper, "Der Mament" (The Moment). In 1923 to 1924, he published the magazine "Kolot" (Voices).

In 1924, Steinman emigrated with his family to Mandate Palestine and began working for the Hebrew Writers Union. He became the first editor of the Hebrew literary magazine "Katuvim" in 1926, which was founded upon the initiative of Hayim Nahman Bialik. The magazine took its name from the Katuvim group founded by Steinman, Avraham Shlonsky and others to seek the renewal of Hebrew literature. From 1932 to 1933, Steinman was the sole editor of the magazine, which, however, lost the support of the Hebrew Writers Union. Throughout these years, Steinman continued his writing and published many books, including books of essays, novels, children's books and anthologies.

He died in Tel Aviv in 1970.

== Awards and honours ==
- In 1959, Steinman was the co-recipient (jointly with Avraham Shlonsky) of the Bialik Prize for literature.
- In 1963, he was awarded the Israel Prize, in literature.

== Family ==
Steinman's sons are the writers, Nathan Shaham and David Shaham.

== Published works ==
To be completed

== See also ==
- List of Israel Prize recipients
