= Otfrid of Weissenburg =

Poet and monk in 9th-century Alsace

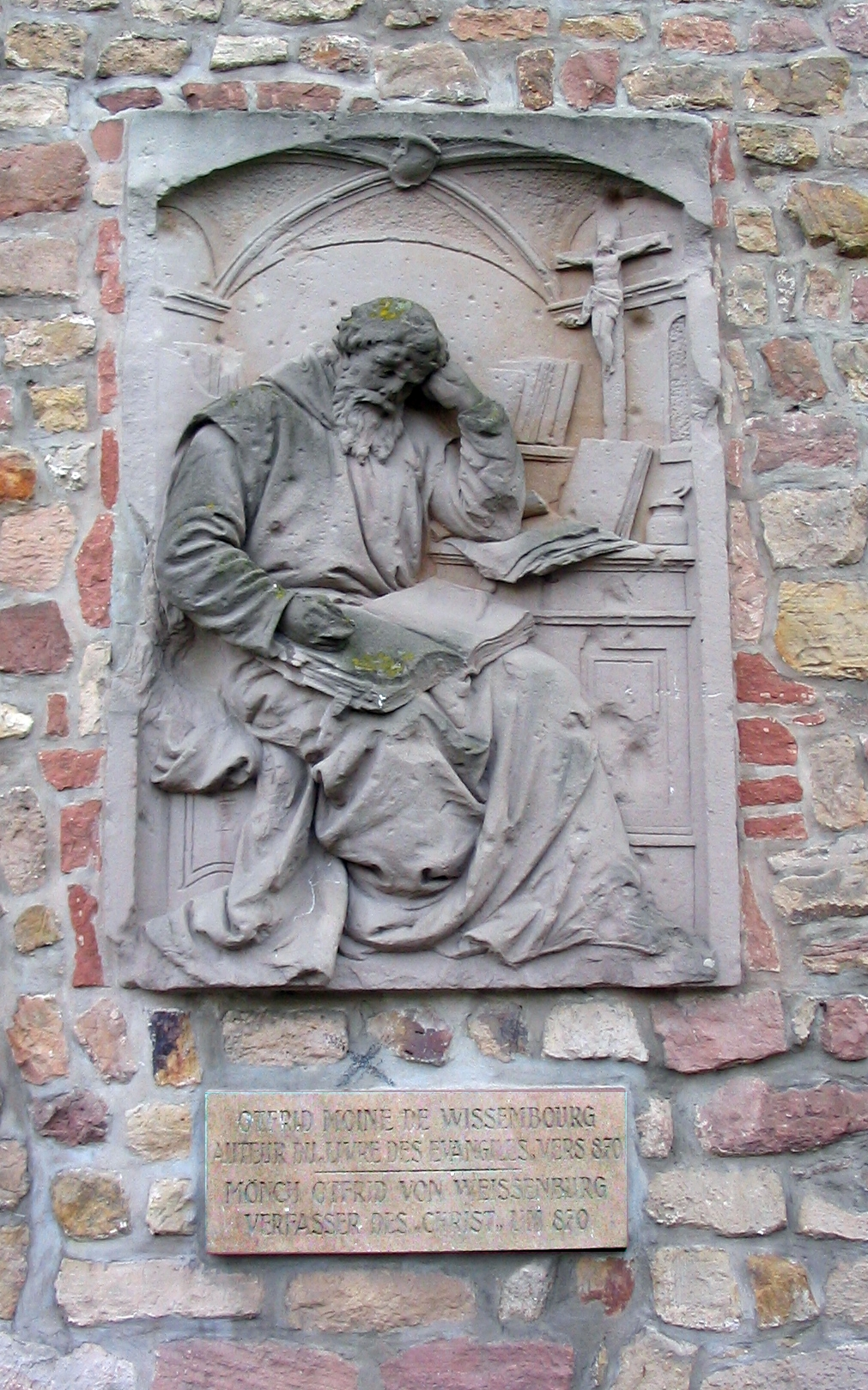
Otfrid memorial in Wissembourg

Otfrid of Weissenburg (German: Otfrid von Weißenburg; Latin: Otfridus; c. 800 - after 870 AD) was a monk at the abbey of Weissenburg (modern-day Wissembourg in Alsace) and the author of a gospel harmony in rhyming couplets now called the Evangelienbuch. It is written in the South Rhine Franconian dialect of Old High German. The poem is thought to have been completed between 863 and 871. Otfrid is the first German poet whose name we know from his work.

== Life ==
More is known about Otfrid's life and work than about that of almost any other medieval German poet. He was born around 800. Assuming he followed the normal progression of monastic life, he will have entered Weissenburg as a novice at the age of seven, become sub-deacon by around 821, deacon around 826 and priest around 830.

The Latin letter which prefaces the Evangelienbuch indicates that he was taught at Fulda by Hrabanus Maurus, and this was mostly likely in the period 832–842. There is evidence that before going to Fulda he was one of the two scribes who spent time at the court of Louis the German when Grimald (abbot of Weissenburg, c. 825–839 and 847–872) was Louis' chancellor. After his return from Fulda, Otfrid acted as magister scholae at Weissenburg, responsible for the teaching of the novices.

His date of death is around 870. Haubrichs has drawn attention to the recorded death of a presbyter Otfridus on 23 January 867, who may be the author of the Evangelienbuch, but this identification is not universally accepted.

== Work ==
The Evangelienbuch was the work of an old man, and for most of his monastic life Otfrid was concerned with teaching and with the preparation of works in Latin, including biblical commentary, and glossaries to the gospels. Otfrid's own hand has been identified in the manuscripts of five bible commentaries, Priscian's Institutiones Grammaticae, an anthology of Priscian with Latin and OHG glosses, parts of Augustine's Treatises on the Gospel of John.

Beyond this, his impetus is seen behind the expansion of the monastery's library holdings and the increased activity of its scriptorium in this period. The resulting collection of commentaries and other reference materials for almost all of the books of the Bible was exceptional in scope.

== The Evangelienbuch ==
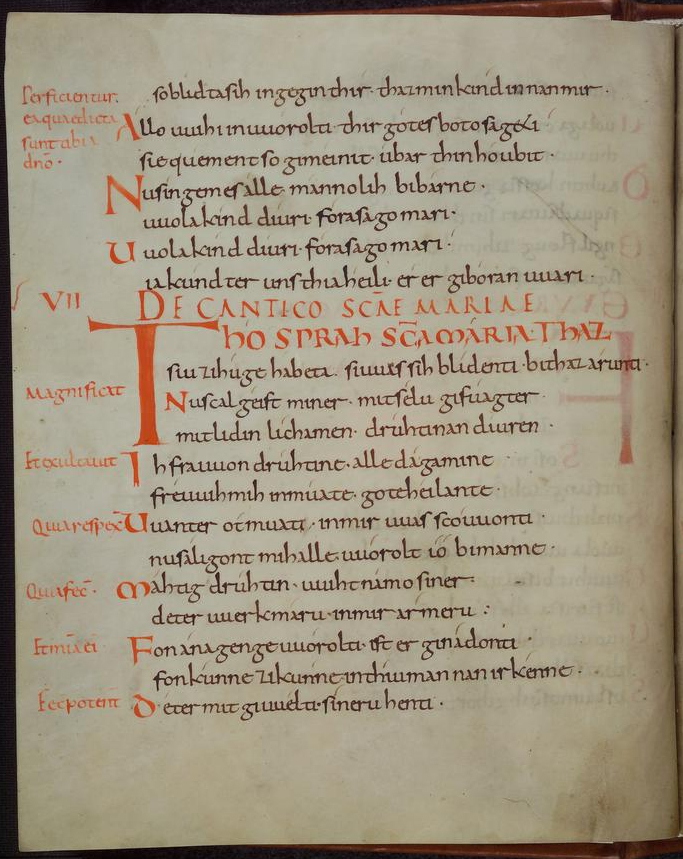
Otfrids Evangelienbuch, Manuscript P (Heidelberg, Universitätsbibliothek, Cpl 52), folio 19 verso

With 7104 couplets, the Evangelienbuch is the first substantial literary work and the first use of rhyme in German literature – surviving earlier German poetry is alliterative. It is not certain whether Otfrid's choice of form was inspired by Latin models or by vernacular verse which has not survived – Otfrid himself mentions laicorum cantus obscenus ("obscene song of the laiety"), of which there are no survivals.

Otfrid was fully aware of the novelty of his undertaking: the work starts with a section headed 'Cur scriptor hunc librum theotisce dictaverit' ('Why the author has written this book in the vernacular') explaining the reasons for writing in his native dialect (theodiscus) rather than in the Latin one would expect for a religious work.

There are three dedications:

- To Louis the German
- To Solomon I, Bishop of Constance
- At the end of the work, to his friends Hartmuat and Werinbert, monks at the Abbey of St. Gall

The dedication to Louis is followed by a letter in Latin prose to Luitbert, Archbishop of Mainz.

It is the dedications and the letter which allow the dating of the work: it must have been written during both Luitbert's archbishopric (863–889) and the bishopric of Solomon I (839 until his death in 871), which gives the period 863–871.

In his letter to Liutbert, Otfried explains the purpose of the work and discusses some of the problems, both orthographic and grammatical, of writing in German. He also gives the following outline of the structure of the Evangelienbuch:

I have, then, divided this book into five books. Of them the first commemorates the birth of Christ; it ends with the baptism and the teaching of John. The second, His disciples already having been called together, tells how He revealed Himself to the world both by certain signs and by His most brilliant teaching. The third tells a little about the brilliance of the signs and the teaching to the Jews. The fourth tells then how, approaching His passion, He willingly suffered death for us. The fifth calls to memory His resurrection, His conversation afterwards with His disciples, His ascension and the Day of Judgment.

— Translation by James Marchand

=== Verse form ===
The Evangelienbuch is written in rhyming couplets. The layout of the manuscripts shows that the couplets are paired to make, effectively, a four-line stanza, though each couplet is laid out as a single line with a caesura. The poem opens:

Lúdowig ther snéllo, \ thes wísduames fóllo,
er óstarrichi ríhtit ál, \ so Fránkono kúning scal;
Ubar Fránkono lant \ so gengit éllu sin giwalt,
thaz ríhtit, so ih thir zéllu, \ thiu sin giwált ellu.

Ludwig the bold \ full of wisdom
He rules the whole eastern kingdom \ as befits a king of the Franks
over the land of the Franks \ extends all his power
As I tell you, that is ruled by all his power

The bold letters in the manuscript, the first and last in each pair of couplets, here mark an acrostic on the name of Louis.

=== Audience ===
There is debate about the audience for Otfrid's work, whether it was primarily a clerical or lay audience, whether the work was meant for recitation or private reading, and even the possibility that it was sung.

It is perhaps unlikely that the Weissenburg monks themselves would use the Evangelienbuch for private reading rather than the gospels and commentaries in the monastery library, but it could have proved a suitable text for lay brothers without the Latin to read the scriptures. McLintock suggests it "may have been read aloud in the refectory at meal-times in place of the Latin sermons more commonly used" In any case, the dedications clearly imply an expected monastic audience of some sort.

The dedication to Louis the German, however, also suggests an expectation of lay readership. There is ample evidence of an appetite for written literature among the Carolingian nobility, and for the borrowing by the literate laity of suitable religious texts from local monasteries, including Weissenburg itself. Any noble household would have had a house chaplain who might read to his hosts from such a work. The Heidelberg manuscript contains a marginal annotation Kicilo diu scona min filu las ("Fair Kicilo often read me") and Otfrid ascribes the impetus for his work to an unknown "venerable matron" Judith, both of which suggest the likelihood of a lay female readership.

=== Manuscripts ===
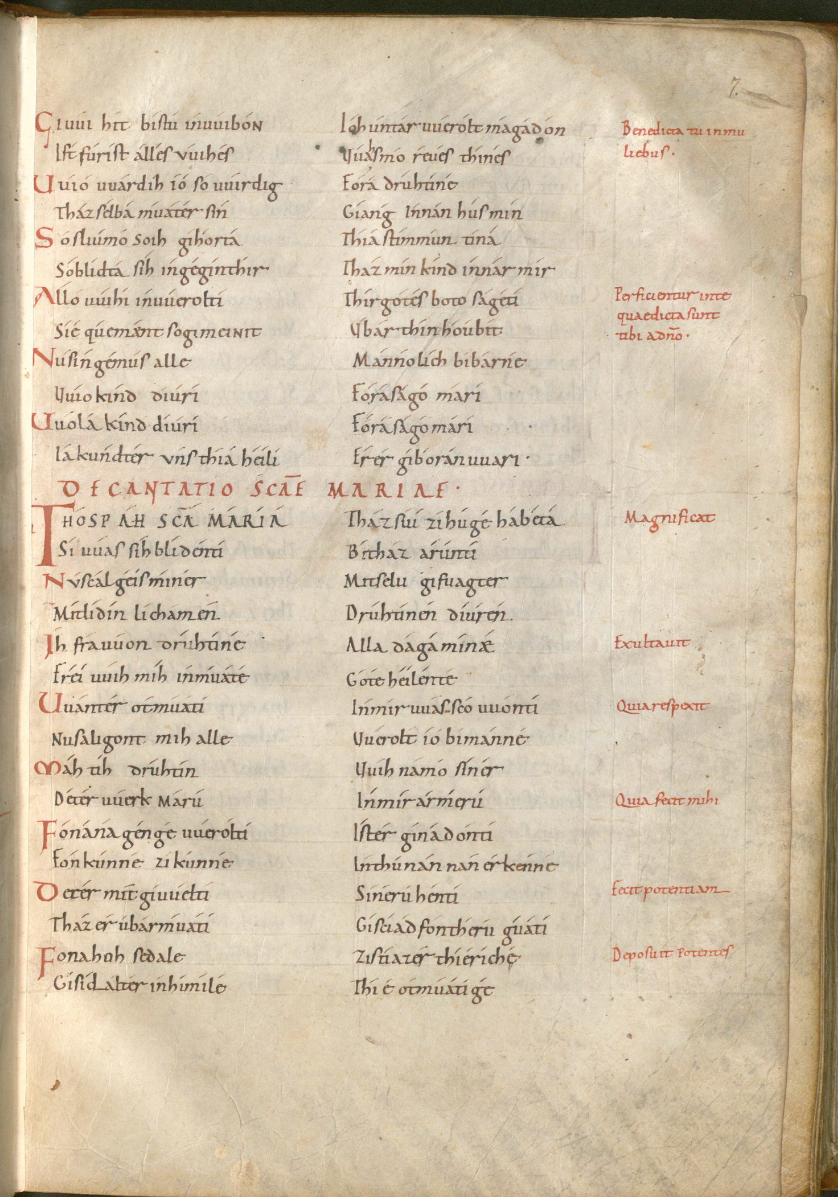
Otfrids Evangelienbuch, Manuscript F (München, Staatsbibliothek, Cgm 14) folio 7 recto

The poem is preserved in four contemporary manuscripts, one of which is fragmentary:

- The Vienna manuscript (V), Codex Vindobonensis, written in Weissenburg by four scribes in the last third of the 9th century, carries corrections which are generally considered to have been made by Otfrid himself.
- The Heidelberg manuscript (P), Codex Palatinus, written in Weissenburg circa 870, copied from V by the same four scribes. It also contains the Georgslied.
- The Munich manuscript (F), Codex Freisingensis, written by Sigihard in Freising circa 902-906. It was copied from V, with some readings from P and the introduction of some Bavarian forms.
- The Codex Discissus (D), written in Fulda circa 975. survives in three sets of fragments used in book bindings (discissus="torn"), each in a different library (Bonn, Wolfenbüttel and Krakau).

Jördens in 1806 mentions two additional manuscripts, now unknown: one reputed to be in Frankfurt-am-Main, and a Junius manuscript "in the Bodleian Library in London" (sic). He also refers to a Munich manuscript, but this may simply be a duplicate reference to F.

=== Reception ===
The Evangelienbuch may have provided an impetus for some of the later short pieces of rhymed narrative such the Georgslied and the Ludwigslied, but the work seems to have been forgotten by the end of the 10th century. Schröder ascribes this to the exegetical passages, which were probably of little interest to lay readers and which monastic readers with a knowledge of Latin did not need in their native language.

Thereafter the poem remained unknown until rediscovered by the humanists. In around 1492 Johannes Trithemius discovered MS V in the library at Weissenburg. and he lists Otfrid in his Liber de scriptoribus ecclesiasticis ("Book concerning ecclesiastical writers") of 1494, the first reference to Otfrid in print. Trithemius praises him as "a man greatly versed in holy scripture and extremely learned in secular literature, a philosopher, orator, astronomer, poet and theologian second to none in his age" and "everything the man wrote is remarkably worth reading, and he imposed rules on the Teutonic language and kept to numbered feet as in metrical verse."

In 1530 MS F was discovered in the Cathedral Library of Freising by Beatus Rhenanus In 1560 Achilles Pirmin Gasser made a manuscript copy of the text, a copy now held in the Schottenstift in Vienna, and this formed the basis of the first printed edition by Matthias Flacius Illyricus in 1571. (Gasser's contribution to the printed volume was a word list for the text, the first printed word list for Old High German.) Johannis Schilter's edition of 1728 followed V, but included readings from Flacius and a Latin translation. In 1821 Hoffmann von Fallersleben published the Bonn fragments of D.

Modern critical editions start with that of Graff in 1831, who drew on all three complete MSS.

While the Evangelienbuch represents a significant technical achievement, modern critics have generally been dismissive of its literary merits and J.G.Robertson's faint praise is typical:

While it is mainly to his adaptation of rhyme to German verse that Otfrid owes his position in German literature, it would be unjust to deny him altogether the possession of higher poetic powers. Overladen as his work is with theological learning, and hampered, especially in the earlier part of the poem, by technical difficulties, there are here and there in his verse flashes of genuine lyric feeling which deserve to be lifted out of the dry religious didacticism in which they are imbedded.

The beauties of Otfrid, a volume published privately in 1936 by two future professors of German, consists of a brief introduction and 136 blank pages.

== Memorials ==
There is a relief on the side wall of the 14th century La Grange aux Dîmes, a building in the Place du Saumon in Wissembourg, which depicts Otfrid at his desk (see above).

Two schools are named after him: the Otfried-von-Weißenburg-Gymnasium in Dahn (Germany) and the Collège Otfried in Wissembourg.

== Sources ==
- Bostock, J. Knight (1976). King, K. C.; McLintock, D. R. (eds.). A Handbook on Old High German Literature (2nd ed.). Oxford. pp. 190–212. ISBN 0-19-815392-9.
- Considine, John (2008). Dictionaries in Early Modern Europe. Cambridge: Cambridge University Press. ISBN 978-0-521-88674-1.
- de Boor, Helmut (1971). Geschichte der deutschen Literatur. Vol. Band I. Von Karl dem Großen bis zum Beginn der höfischen Literatur 770-1170. München: C.H.Beck. ISBN 3-406-00703-1.
- Forster, L.W; Thomas, R. Hinton; Button, Henry G. (1936). The beauties of Otfrid / nach Problemen und Motiven ausgewählt und geordnet. (Privately printed).
- Forster, Leonard; Button, Henry (1997). "The Story of 'The Beauties of Otfrid'". In Ridley, Hugh; McPherson, Karin (eds.). Feste Freundschrift: Essays and Short Pieces in Honour of Peter Johnson. Dublin: University College. pp. 27–31.
- Handschriftencensus. "Gesamtverzeichnis Autoren/Werke Otfrid von Weißenburg: 'Evangelienbuch'". Handschriftencensus.
- Haubrichs, Wolfgang (1978). "Eine prosopographische Skizze zu Otfrid von Weissenburg". In Kleiber, Wolfgang (ed.). Otfried von Weissenburg. Wege der Forschung CCCCXIX. Darmstadt: Wissenschaftliche Buchgesellschaft. pp. 397–414.
- Haubrichs, Wolfgang (1980). "Nekrologische Notizen zu Otfrid von Weißenburg". In Wenzel, Horst (ed.). Adelsherrschaft und Literatur. Beiträge zur älteren Deutschen Literaturgeschichte 6. Bern: Peter Lang. pp. 7–113.
- Jammers, Ewald (1957). "Das Mittelalterliche Deutsche Epos und die Musik". Heidelberger Jahrbücher. Vol. 1. pp. 31–90. doi:10.1007/978-3-642-45884-2_3. ISBN 978-3-540-02179-7.
- Jördens, Karl Heinrich (1806). Lexikon deutscher Dichter und Prosaisten. Leipzig: Weidmann.
- Kartschoke, Dieter (1975). Bibeldichtung. Studien zur Geschichte der epischen Bibelparaphrase von Juvencus bis Otfried von Weißenburg. München: Wilhelm Fink. ISBN 978-3770510887.
- Kleiber, Wolfgang (1971). Otfried von Weißenburg. Untersuchungen zur handschriftlichen Überlieferung und Studien zum Aufbau des Evangelienbuches. Bern: Francke. ISBN 9783772006487.
- Kössinger, Norbert (2009). Otfrids 'Evangelienbuch' in der Frühen Neuzeit. Studien zu den Anfängen der deutschen Philologie. Tübingen: Niemeyer. ISBN 978-3-484-36635-0.
- Marchand, James (1992). "OHTFRID'S LETTER TO LIUDBERT". The Saint Pachomius Library.
- März, Christoph (1999). "Otfrid von Weißenburg". Neue Deutsche Biographie (in German). Vol. 19. Berlin: Duncker & Humblot. pp. 640–641.
- McKitterick, Rosamond (2008). The Carolingians and the Written Word. Cambridge: Cambridge University Press. ISBN 978-0521315654.
- Meineke, Eckhard; Schwerdt, Judith (2001). Einführung in das Althochdeutsche. UTB 2167. Paderborn, München, Wien, Zürich: Schöning. ISBN 3-8252-2167-9.
- Neal, Philip (2011). "Trithemius on Otfrid von Weissenburg". Archived from the original on 7 June 2012.
- Robertson, John G. (1902). A History of German Literature. New York: G. P. Putnam's sons. ISBN 9780851581033.
- Schröder W (1989). "Otfrid von Weißenburg". In Ruh K, Keil G, Schröder W (eds.). Die deutsche Literatur des Mittelalters. Verfasserlexikon. Vol. 7. Berlin, New York: Walter De Gruyter. pp. 172–193. ISBN 978-3-11-022248-7.
- Schlosser, Horst Dietrich (1996). "Zur Datierung von Otfrieds 'Evangelienbuch'". Zeitschrift für deutsches Altertum und deutsche Literatur. Vol. Band 125, heft 4. S. Hirzel Verlag. pp. 386–391.
- Trithemius, Johannes (1494). Liber de scriptoribus ecclesiasticis. Basel: Amberbach.

== Editions ==
- Flacius, Matthias, ed. (1571). Otfridi Evangeliorvm liber: ueterum Germanorum grammaticae, poeseos, theologiae, praeclarum monimentum. = Euangelien Buch, in altfrenckischen reimen, durch Otfriden von Weissenburg, Münch zu S.Gallen vor sibenhundert jaren beschriben: Jetz aber mit gunst des gestrengen ehrenvesten herrn Adolphen Herman Riedesel / Erbmarschalk zu Hessen / der alten Teutschen spraach und gottsforcht zuerlenen / in truck verfertiget. Basel: Petri. (Google Books)
- Schilter, Johann, ed. (1728). Thesaurus antiquitatum Teutonicarum, ecclesiasticarum, civilium, letterariarum. Vol. 1. Monumenta Ecclesiastica Christiana Veterum Francorum & Alemannorum. Ulm: Daniel Bartholomæus. (Internet Archive)
- Hoffmann von Fallersleben, H., ed. (1821). Bonner Bruchstücke vom Otfried nebst anderen deutschen Sprachdenkmälern. Bonn: C. von Bruch.
- Graff, E.G., ed. (1831). Krist. Das älteste von Otfrid im neunten Jahrhundert verfaßte, hochdeutsche Gedicht, nach den drei gleichzeitigen zu Wien, München und Heidelberg befindlichen Handschriften kritisch herausgegen. Königsberg: Gebrüder Bornträger.
- Kelle, Johann, ed. (1856). Otfrieds von Weissenburg Evangelienbuch. Vol. Bd. 1: Text, Einleitung, Grammatik, Metrik, Kommentar. Regensburg: G. Joseph Manz.
- Erdmann, Oskar, ed. (1882). Otfrids Evangelienbuch. Halle/Saale: J.C.B. Mohr.
- Piper, Paul, ed. (1882). Otfrids Evangelienbuch. Mit Einleitung, erklärenden Anmerkungen und ausführlichem Glossar. Paderborn: Ferdinand Schöningh.
- Wolff, Ludwig, ed. (1973). Otfrids Evangelienbuch. Altdeutsche Textbibliothek 49 (6th ed.). Tübingen: Niemeyer.
- Kleiber, Wolfgang, ed. (2004). Otfrid von Weißenburg Evangelienbuch. Vol. Band I: Edition nach der Heidelberger Handschrift P (Codex Pal. Lat. 52) und der Handschrift D (Codex Discissus: Bonn, Berlin/Krakau Wolfenbüttel). Tübingen: Niemeyer. ISBN 978-3484640528.
- Kleiber, Wolfgang, ed. (2006). Otfrid von Weißenburg Evangelienbuch. Vol. Band II/1: Edition nach dem Wiener Codex 2687. Tübingen: Niemeyer. ISBN 978-3484640511.
- Otfrid von Weißenburg Evangelienbuch. Auswahl. Althochdeutsch/Neuhochdeutsch. Translated by Vollmann-Profe, Gisela. Tübingen: Niemeyer. 2006. ISBN 978-3-15-008384-0. (selections with modern German translation)
- Braune, W.; Helm, K.; Ebbinghaus, E. A., eds. (1994). "XXXII. Aus Otfrids Evangelienbuch". Althochdeutsches Lesebuch (17th ed.). Tübingen. pp. 92–130. ISBN 3-484-10707-3. (Extracts based on the Vienna MS).
