= Rumpelstiltskin (1995 film) =

- Directed by: Mark Jones
- Written by: Mark Jones; Joe Ruby
- Produced by: Joe Ruby; Ken Spears
- Starring: Kim Johnston Ulrich; Tommy Blaze; Allyce Beasley; Max Grodénchik
- Cinematography: Douglas Milsome
- Edited by: Christopher Holmes
- Music by: Charles Bernstein
- Distributed by: Republic Pictures
- Release date: November 24, 1995
- Running time: 87 minutes
- Country: United States
- Language: English
- Budget: $3 million
- Box office: $306,494

Rumpelstiltskin is a 1995 American fantasy horror comedy film directed by Mark Jones who co-wrote with Joe Ruby. The film stars Kim Johnston Ulrich, Tommy Blaze, Allyce Beasley, and Max Grodénchik as the title character. The plot follows a demonic creature who is freed from a widow's wish to see her deceased police officer husband one last time wants the soul of her infant son.

Rumpelstiltskin received a limited theatrical release theatrically in the United States by Republic Pictures on November 24, 1995, to negative reviews from critics.

== Plot ==
Somewhere in 15th century Europe, the hobgoblin Rumpelstiltskin is pursued by a mob to a nearby cliffside after kidnapping the baby that a local village woman promised to him in exchange for spinning straw into gold. After several failed attacks from the mob, a gypsy witch transforms him into a small stone effigy to be imprisoned for a thousand years, released prematurely only under the stipulation that a heartfelt wish be made unto it involving a child.

In present-day Los Angeles, police officer Russell Stewart is gunned down in the line of duty during a botched carjacking, widowing his pregnant wife Shelly in the process. Sometime later, a grieving Shelly, her newborn Johnny and best friend Hildy visit Matilda's Place, an antique witch's shop that now possesses the stone. Intrigued by its supposed ability to grant wishes, and against Matilda's advice, Shelly purchases the stone.

At home, Shelly tearfully wishes her deceased husband could meet their son, fulfilling the parameters in freeing Rumpelstiltskin. Later that night she envisions being visited by Russell and the two make love. She awakens to find Russell's likeness replaced by Rumpelstiltskin, who eagerly demands Johnny as payment for her wish fulfillment. Shelly and Johnny narrowly escape, only to return the next day with baffled authorities. They stay with Hildy the following night and Shelly is regaled of the ancient Rumpelstiltskin fairytale involving a nefarious little man who spun straw into gold in exchange for a firstborn child, noting its similarities to her previous night's encounter.

In the middle of the night Rumpelstiltskin appears, once again demanding Johnny. Hildy is killed while Shelly and Johnny flee by car. Rumpelstiltskin then murders a passing biker and steals his motorcycle, which he soon trades out for a tanker truck and continues pursuit as it leads into the mountainous outskirts of Bakersfield.

After her car dies the following morning, Shelly flags down fellow motorist and chauvinistic "professional asshole" TV show host Max Bergman, who, in denial of her story, reluctantly chauffeurs them forward. A lengthy vehicular pursuit ensues through the winding terrain, terminating with Max duping Rumpelstiltskin with a dune buggy to drive off a hillside and into a standing tree below, igniting the tanker in a fiery explosion. Upon investigation of the crash by a local deputy, Rumpelstiltskin is revealed to be alive. He soon kills the officer as Shelly, Max and Johnny escape in the squad car. The three hide out in an abandoned diner while deciding what to do.

Shelly realizes that Rumpelstiltskin came from the stone she purchased at Matilda's Place and that it was her own wish that brought him to life. Before she can contact Matilda, officers rush in, arrest them and haul them back to the precinct to be charged with the deputy's murder. With their sole phone call, Shelly reaches Matilda, who says she can help. Shortly after, Rumpelstiltskin infiltrates the station, kills several officers and kidnaps Johnny. Shelly and Max are released from their cell by a mortally wounded sheriff and commandeer a nearby car, which happens to contain Matilda.

Matilda informs them that Rumpelstiltskin has no soul of his own and thus wants Johnny's to consume, which requires a graveyard ritual before sunrise. To stop him Matilda adds, fire and chaff (aka ordinary straw) in conjunction with an ancient chant spoken three times must be utilized. Viewing this interaction through a vision spell, Rumpelstiltskin telekinetically chokes Matilda to death before proceeding to the graveyard with Johnny in hand. Shelly and Max locate the nearest graveyard by map and attempt to stop the ritual in progress, but are thwarted by Rumpelstiltskin's magic. They retreat to a nearby barn containing straw and a front loader tractor. Shelly realizes the chant Matilda referred to is his name as such in the fairytale. Armed with all they need, Max drives the tractor with burning straw in its loader up the graveyard and after Rumpelstiltskin. The tractor momentarily stalls, but soon clears and captures Rumpelstiltskin in its blazing loader before running into a powerline and erupting into an electrical explosion.

Shelly confronts the now severely injured Rumpelstiltskin and calls out his name three times, reincarcerating him back to his stone effigy form to presumably live out the remainder of his thousand-year sentence. Shelly finds Johnny in a nearby grave unharmed, while Max throws the figurine into a creek. The three leave together as Shelly agrees to a date with Max, who's now apparently "out of the asshole business."

Three years later, a young girl finds the figurine and rushes to show her mother, who is revealed to have an infant in her arms.

== Cast ==
- Kim Johnston Ulrich as Shelly Stewart
- Tommy Blaze as Max Bergman
- Allyce Beasley as Hildy
- Max Grodénchik as Rumpelstiltskin
- Vera Lockwood as Matilda
- Jay Pickett as Russell Stewart
- Sherman Augustus as John McCabe
- Valerie Wildman as Nedda
- Jack McGee as Detective Ben Smith
- Mark Holton as Huge Man
- Elmarie Wendel as Gypsy Woman

== Production ==
Mark Jones and producer Michael Prescott had initially been involved in pre-production on Leprechaun 2, but when Rumpelstiltskin was greenlit the two took producer credits for Leprechaun 2 while opting to do Rumpelstiltskin.

== Release ==
Rumpelstiltskin was not a success at the box office, it made only $306,494, with its widest release being 54 theaters. The film was released on DVD on August 21, 2001, by Republic Pictures. The film was released on DVD on January 10, 2004, by Lionsgate Home Entertainment

== Critical response ==
AllMovie wrote, "this groan-inducing would-be camp [...] boasts some good makeup by Kevin Yagher but is still easily the worst of the '90s crop of fairy-tale horrors." JoBlo.com's Arrow in the Head reviewed the movie in 2019, stating that "Listen, RUMPELSTILTSKIN is no award-winner, we all understand that. However, the movie is much better than the 10% box-office return it suffered on its already modest budget. It’s fast, fun, funny, gory, and knowingly pokes fun of itself as nothing more than a dark farcical fairytale."

Most reviews by the general public are polarized, both citing the film's absurdity as the deciding factor in their opinion.
