= Rumpelstiltskin (1965 musical) =

1965 Hebrew-language musical by Avraham Shlonsky

- Hebrew: עוץ-לי-גוץ-לי
- Music: Dov Seltzer
- Lyrics: Avraham Shlonsky
- Book: Avraham Shlonsky
- Basis: Rumpelstiltskin by the Brothers Grimm

Rumpelstiltskin (Hebrew: עוץ-לי-גוץ-לי, "my-advisor-my-midget") is a Hebrew language–musical based on the fairytale of the same name by the Brothers Grimm, written by Avraham Shlonsky. Shlonsky's rendition casts the story in a humoristic light, rather than the grim tone of the original. All monologues and dialogues are spoken in rhyme, and incorporate sophisticated wordplay using the Hebrew language at a high level alongside many inverted allusions to Jewish tradition, including one to the taboo over uttering the Tetragrammaton. Most notable of these allusions are those to the holiday of Purim and its connected piyutim, and to the bases of Hebrew grammar and pronunciation. This musical is considered one of the longest running, most popular shows in Israel.

== Casts ==
| Character | Original cast 1965 | 4th Cameri Revival 2002 | 5th Cameri Revival 2020 |
|---|---|---|---|
| The King | Ze'ev Revach | Alon Ofir / Itay Tiran / Ido Mosseri / Asaf Goldstien / Shoham Shiener | Nadav Netz / Gilad Shmueli |
| Miller | | Eli Gorenstein / Igal Naor / Assaf Pariente / Simcha Barbiro | Eli Gorenstein / Simcha Barbiro |
| The Miller's daughter | Shoshik Shani | Elinor Aharon / Meyrav Feldman | Jordan Nikfahama / Noy Halperin |
| Rumpelstiltskin | Avraham Chalfi | Yossi Toledo / Asaf Goldstien | Alon Sandler / David Bilenca |

== History ==
Rumpelstiltskin was first performed in the Cameri Theater in 1965, directed by Yossi Yizraeli, who adapted Shlonsky's original script of a non-musical play into a libretto for a musical. In Israel, this musical is considered a classic and is still presented to this day.
