= Eberhard Gottlieb Graff =

German philologist

- Born: March 10, 1780; Elbing, Prussia
- Died: October 18, 1841 (aged 61)
- Education: University of Königsberg
- Occupation: philologist
- Known for: Althochdeutscher Sprachschatz (1835–1843)
- Notable work: Diutiska (1826–1829); Krist (1831); Deutsche Interlinearversionen der Psalmen (1839)

Eberhard Gottlieb Graff (10 March 1780 – 18 October 1841) was a German philologist.

He was born at Elbing, Prussia, and was educated at Königsberg, where he became professor of the German language in 1824. Influenced by the work of Jacob Grimm and Karl Lachmann, he followed in the footsteps of these eminent scholars, and produced several philological works distinguished by careful research, such as his valuable discussion on Old High German, entitled Althochdeutscher Sprachschatz (6 volumes, 1835–43). Other significant literary efforts by Graff include:

- Diutiska, Denkmäler deutscher Sprache und Literatur aus alten Handschriften, 3 volumes, 1826–29 – Diutiska, German language and literature from ancient manuscripts.
- Krist. Das älteste von Otfrid im neunten Jahrhundert, 1831 – Krist: the oldest, written by Otfrid in the ninth century.
- Deutsche Interlinearversionen der Psalmen, 1839 – German interlinear versions of the Psalms.
