= Tabula Rasa (novel) =

Novel by Nathan Shaham

Tabula Rasa לוח חלק
- Cover image
- Author: Nathan Shaham
- Language: Hebrew
- Genre: Literary fiction
- Publisher: Zmora-Bitan
- Publication date: 2010 (1st edition)
- Publication place: Israel
- Media type: Print (Hardcover)
- Pages: 365

Tabula Rasa (Hebrew: לוח חלק) is a 2010 novel by Israeli author Nathan Shaham. Originally published in Hebrew, the book has not yet appeared in English translation.

Shaham, himself a long-time member of Kibbutz Beit Alfa, has said he wasn't interested in assigning blame for the failures of the kibbutz depicted in the novel, only trying to understand what happened and why.

== Plot ==
The novel charts the rise and fall of the fictional kibbutz Givat Abirim, set against the backdrop of its modern-day privatization and the introduction of differential wages. Its central character, Hanan Harari, is a painter and ideological communist in his seventies who has lived on the kibbutz since before the establishment of the state in 1948. Hanan's personal and professional vicissitudes, and in particular his increasing preference for abstract painting, become a metaphor for the disintegration of the collective vision of the kibbutz. Whereas his representational art once found enthusiastic acceptance and was prominently displayed in public places, Hanan comes under heavy criticism from the other members, including his wife, as his work becomes more abstract. But when the kibbutz is privatized, Hanan can no longer resist the market-driven pressures to create "sentimental landscapes that the gallery in Jaffa was so enthusiastic about and which he loathed."

== Critical reception ==
Ketzia Alon of Haaretz hailed Tabula Rasa as both "an important historical and sociological document" and "a novel of monumental proportions, an impressive if sad memorial to the grand experiment in human engineering" that was the kibbutz: "Shaham has managed to find exactly the proper tone to tell the story of the life and death of the kibbutz: through neither bitter criticism nor tender nostalgia, but a highly sober literary perspective that produces realistic prose and the illusion of a genuine slice of life." Maariv, on the other hand, lamented the book's length and described it as "simplistic and schematic".
