= Rumpelstiltskin (1985 film) =

1985 film

- Based on: Rumpelstiltskin by Brothers Grimm
- Screenplay by: Alan Templeton and Mary Crawford
- Directed by: Pino van Lamsweerde (director); Sebastian Grunstra (animation director)
- Starring: Charity Brown; Les Lye; Robert Bockstael; Al Baldwin
- Narrated by: Christopher Plummer
- Theme music composer: Alan Templeton (songs); John Harris (score) and Peter Chapin (score)
- Country of origin: Canada
- Original language: English

Production
- Executive producer: W.H. Stevens Jr.
- Producer: Hugh Campbell
- Editors: David Vainola; Sue Robertson
- Running time: 25 min.
- Production companies: Atkinson Film-Arts; Animated Investments; Telefilm Canada; CTV Television Network

Original release
- Network: Syndication
- Release: December 14, 1985

Related
- The Velveteen Rabbit (1985); The Tin Soldier (1986)

Rumpelstiltskin is a 1985 Canadian animated television special depicting the story of a miller's daughter and a little man who can spin straw into gold. This story was collected by the Brothers Grimm. Premiering on CTV in Canada and in the United States in syndication on December 14, 1985, Rumpelstiltskin was released onto home video in 1986, on VHS. Family Home Entertainment was the distributor, in association with several Canadian animation firms.

The film was first released onto DVD on October 30, 2007 coupled with The Tin Soldier, released in 1986, in a Holiday two-pack. Nelvana obtained the rights to this special as of 2007, although they were not originally part of the special's production.

== Cast ==
- Christopher Plummer as The narrator
- Robert Bockstael as Rumpelstiltskin
- Charity Brown as Miller's Daughter
- Les Lye as Miller
- Al Baldwin as the King
