= Rumpelstiltskin (2011 musical) =

Musical

Rumpelstiltskin: the Musical
- Off-Broadway Poster
- Music: Steve Marzullo
- Lyrics: Amelia DeMayo
- Book: Deb Roberts
- Basis: Brothers Grimm Fairytale Rumpelstiltskin
- Productions: 2011 Reading; 2012 Off-Broadway; 2012 New Jersey

Rumpelstiltskin is a musical based on the Brother's Grimm Fairytale of the same name, featuring a score by Broadway composer / music director Steve Marzullo, lyrics by Amelia DeMayo, and book by Deb Roberts. This adaptation differs slightly from its source material but honors the story. Rumpelstiltskin is currently unavailable for licensing.

== Background ==
In 2008, a draft of the show was workshopped in New Jersey by the writers DeMayo, Marzullo, and Roberts featuring young actors from New Jersey. After this workshop, the project was put on hold for three years.

== Productions ==
=== Reading ===
In 2011, the show resumed development and was presented as a reading in NYC under the direction of the book writer, Deb Roberts featuring a cast solely of Broadway kids and teenagers. The book underwent much development after this process due to critical reception from producers.

=== Off-Broadway ===
The show was first presented Off-Broadway by the WorkShop Theater in association with the Broadway Youth Ensemble. Produced by Jeff Paul and Evan Bernardin, the production opened in January 2012 after one week of previews. This production contained a large cast of young Broadway stars. It also featured direction by Kathy Gail MacGowan, choreography by Steve Petrillo, lighting and sets by Michael Selkirk, costumes by Miriam Hyfler and Stefania Diana Schramm, and musical direction by Marzullo, the show’s composer. After only a four-month run, the production closed in April. However, in its short run, the cast underwent much change and saw many swings and understudies who soon became replacements.

=== New Jersey ===
No more than a month after closing at the WorkShop Theater, the production was revived in New Jersey for one weekend only featuring some members of the original cast, replications of most set pieces, costumes, and lighting, and new musical direction / arrangements by Joseph Baker.

== Casts ==
Characters	Reading Cast (2011)	Original Off-Broadway Cast (2012) *	Closing Off-Broadway Cast (2012)
'The Elf (Rumpelstiltskin)	Ethan Haberfield	Ethan Haberfield	Jake Kitchin
Bella	Lina Silver	Bailey Grey	Lina Silver
Prince Alexander	Ellis Gage	Ellis Gage	Ellis Gage
Henny The Herald	Paige Simunovich	Paige Simunovich	Kirrilee Berger
The Prime Minister	Evan Rocco	Zachary Sayle	Tomas Correa
The Miller	Gabe Green	Gabe Green	Gabe Green
Lucy The Dragon	Bianca Rose	Hayley Feinstein ±/ Bianca Rose	Scarlett Diaz/ Bianca Rose
Rosalinda	Kirrilee Berger	Rachel Stamberg	Rachel Stamberg
Gwendolyn	Scarlett Diaz	Carly Paige Baron	Hayley Feinstein
Celeste	Kaylie Rubinaccio	Rachel Khutorsky	Melinda Orengo
Francesca	Bianca Rose	Melinda Orengo/ Bianca Rose	Samantha Maza/ Bianca Rose

± Though Hayley Feinstein was officially listed as "Lucy The Dragon" on record at the time of opening, Scarlett Diaz (the understudy) played the role on opening night.

* The understudy / swing listing at the time of opening was as follows: Understudy for Elf and Alexander: Jake Kitchin; for Bella: Scarlett Diaz, Melinda Orengo, Lina Silver; for Henny: Kirrilee Berger, Scarlett Diaz, Melinda Orengo; for Prime Minister and Baker: Tomas Correa; for Lucy: Scarlett Diaz, Samantha Maza, Bianca Rose; for Rosalinda and Celeste: Samantha Maza, Melinda Orengo; for Gwendolyn: Scarlett Diaz; for Francesca: Samantha Maza, Bianca Rose. | Swings: Tomas Correa, Scarlett Diaz, Jake Kitchin, Samantha Maza, Melinda Orengo, Bianca Rose.

== Musical numbers ==
(as they appeared in the original Off-Broadway Production)

- “Talented” - Henny
- “Hear Ye” - Henny, Prime Minister
- “His Majesty’s Ring” - Village Girls, Henny, Prime Minister
- “Hear Ye” (Reprise) - Prime Minister
- “Money” - Prime Minister, Village Girls, Henny
- “Give Her A Chance” - Miller, Bella, Village Girls, Henny
- “A Wonderful Day” - Alexander
- “My Dragon” - Alexander, Lucy
- “I Know” - Lucy
- “Money” (Reprise) - Prime Minister
- ‘Talented” (Reprise) - Henny
- “Straw Into Gold” - Bella
- “Spinning Wheel” Part 1 / Transformation - Elf, Bella, Company
- “Spinning Wheel” Part 2 / Transformation - Elf, Bella, Company
- The Deal / “Spinning Wheel” Part 3 / Transformation - Elf, Bella, Company
- “The Name” - Elf, Bella, Company
- “Today I Brew” - Elf, Lucy
- “Straw Into Gold” (Reprise) - Bella, Alexander, Elf, Company
