= Blank pad rule =

American legal doctrine and metaphor

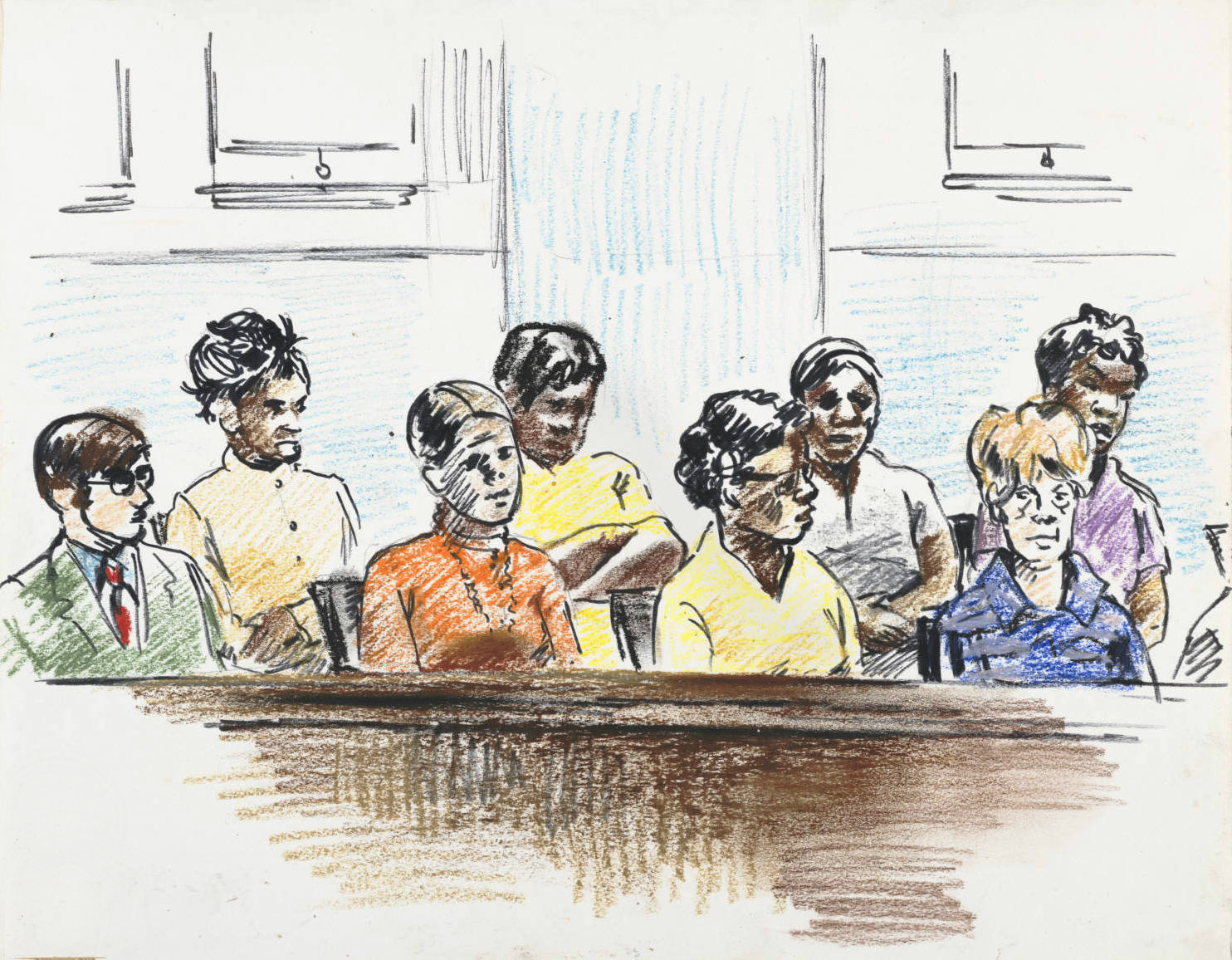
According to the blank pad rule, a jury (illustrated) may not rely upon evidence that is not established at trial.

The blank pad rule is an American term for the legal doctrine and metaphor in common law that requires a tribunal to base its decision solely upon evidence established at trial. In the United States, the Supreme Court has established that in order for a trial to be fair and impartial, a "jury's verdict [must] be based on evidence received in open court, not from outside sources".

== Definition ==
The blank pad rule prohibits courts from considering evidence that has not been established at trial. The doctrine "supposes the minds of the jurors to be like empty tablets upon which the lawyers, under the supervision of the judge, inscribe everything they can legally use to decide the case". In criminal law, the doctrine has been interpreted as a right held by criminal defendants, where "an accused is entitled to a jury that goes into deliberations with their minds void of everything except evidence that has been properly validated". In the United States, the Due Process Clause of the Fourteenth Amendment to the United States Constitution prohibits juries in civil cases from considering extrajudicial evidence during deliberations. The doctrine has also been applied to administrative decisions in the United States. In general, it is synonymous with the phrase tabula rasa, a latin term that means "blank tablet" or "blank slate".

== Origins ==
The origins of the blank pad rule have been traced as far back as the year 1164, when the Constitutions of Clarendon established that "[l]aymen are not to be accused save by proper and legal accusers and witnesses in the presence of the bishop". This principle was ultimately adopted by the common law tradition in England and the United States. In Thomas Jefferson's 1776 draft of the Virginia Constitution, he provided that all cases "shall be tried by a jury upon evidence given viva voce, in open court". In 1915, United States Supreme Court Justice Oliver Wendell Holmes Jr. remarked that "[a]ny judge who has sat with juries knows that in spite of forms they are extremely likely to be impregnated by the environing atmosphere".

== Application within Sixth Amendment jurisprudence ==
The Sixth Amendment to the United States Constitution provides a right to a trial "by an impartial jury". Legal scholars have observed that the Sixth Amendment incorporates "blank pad rule" protections that require tribunals to "make sure that criminal convictions rest only on evidence produced in open court". In Turner v. Louisiana, the Supreme Court of the United States explained that the requirement that a verdict "must be based upon the evidence developed at the trial" is an essential component of the "fundamental integrity of all that is embraced in the constitutional concept of trial by jury". Although it did not rely upon the Sixth Amendment in Marshall v. United States, the Supreme Court of the United States ordered a new trial after the jury was exposed to "news accounts" that were not entered into evidence in court.

== See also ==
- Confrontation Clause
- Judicial notice
- Tabula rasa, the related philosophical concept
