= Rumpelstiltskin (1940 film) =

1940 film

- Rumpelstilzchen
- Directed by: Alf Zengerling
- Written by: Waldemar Lydor; Alf Zengerling
- Produced by: Alf Zengerling
- Cinematography: Herbert Kebelmann
- Music by: Karl Blume
- Production company: Märchen-Film Produktion Alfons Zengerling
- Release date: 3 October 1940 (Germany)
- Running time: 63 minutes
- Country: Germany
- Language: German

Rumpelstiltskin (German: Rumpelstilzchen) is a film from 1940 directed by Alf Zengerling. It stars Paul Walker as the title character.

== Cast ==
- Paul Walker – Rumpelstilzchen
- Hermann Schröder – Miller
- Trude Häfelin – Miller's daughter
- Otto Bredow – King
- Jutta von Alpen – Page
- Kurt Lauermann – Treasurer
