= Meander (art) =

Decorative continuous line border motif

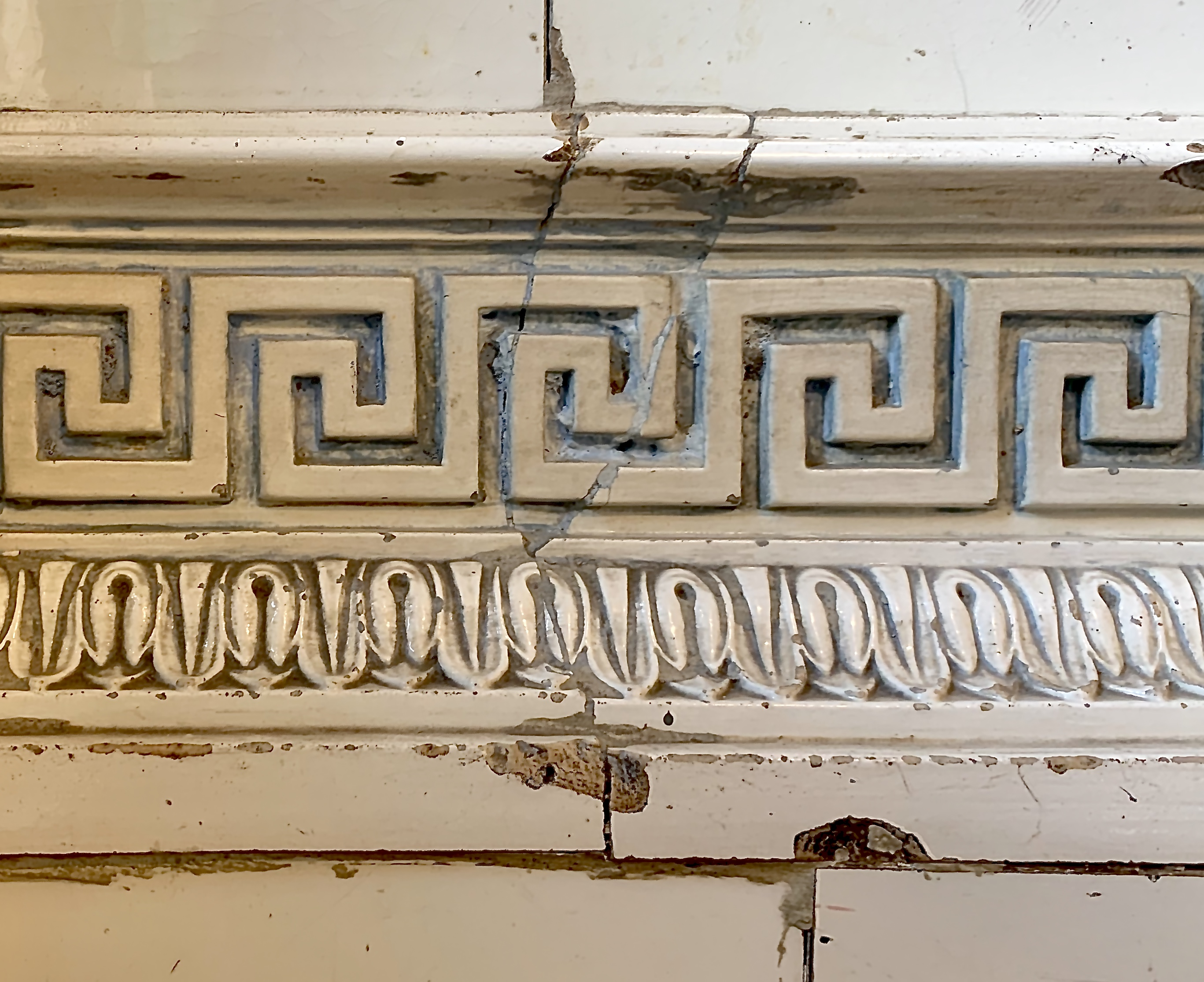
Meander (or Greek key) on a stove in the Dimitrie Sturdza House (Strada Arthur Verona no. 13), Bucharest, Romania, unknown architect, 1883

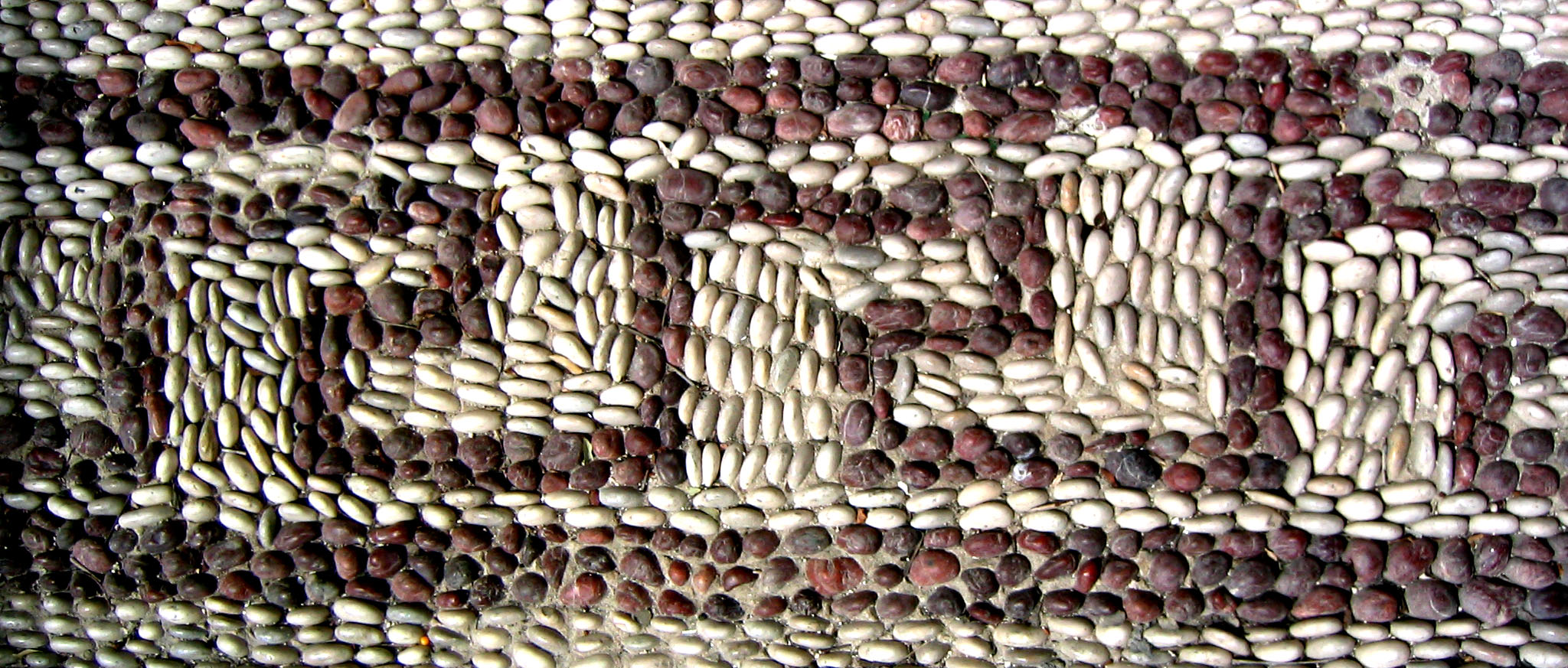
Meander motif in the streets of Rhodes, Greece, in pavement made from beach stones

A meander or meandros (Greek: Μαίανδρος) is a decorative border constructed from a continuous line, shaped into a repeated motif. To some Italians, these patterns are known as "Greek lines". Such a design may also be called the Greek fret or Greek key design, although these terms are modern designations; this decorative motif appears much earlier and among Near and Far Eastern cultures that are far from Greece. Usually the term is used for motifs with straight lines and right angles and the many versions with rounded shapes are called running scrolls or, following the etymological origin of the term, may be identified as water wave motifs.

== Meaning of the name ==
On one hand, the name "meander" recalls the twisting and turning path of the Maeander River in Asia Minor (present day Turkey) that is typical of river pathways. On the other hand, as Karl Kerenyi pointed out, "the meander is the figure of a labyrinth in linear form".

== Decorative uses ==
Meanders are common decorative elements in Greek and Roman art. In ancient Greece they appear in many architectural friezes, and in bands on the pottery of ancient Greece from the Geometric period onward. The design is common to the present-day in classicizing architecture, and is adopted frequently as a decorative motif for borders for many modern printed materials.

== Labyrinthine meanders in China ==
The meander is a fundamental design motif in regions far from a Hellenic orbit: labyrinthine meanders ("thunder" pattern) appear in bands and as infill on Shang bronzes (c. 1600 BC – c. 1045 BC), and many traditional buildings in and around China still bear geometric designs almost identical to meanders. Although space-filling curves have a long history in China in motifs more than several hundred years earlier, extending back to Zhukaigou Culture (c. 2000 BC – c. 1400 BC) and Xiajiadian Culture (c. 2200 BC – c. 1600 BC and c. 1000 BC – c. 600 BC), frequently there is speculation that meanders of Greek origin may have come to China during the time of the Han dynasty (c. 202 BC) by way of trade with the Greco-Bactrian Kingdom. The oldest meander motive discovered so far is a key pattern from Mezin, Ukraine, Eastern Europe, from paleolithic era (circa 23,000BCE).

== Pre-Columbian Mesoamerican art ==
Meander motifs also appears in pre-Columbian art in the western hemisphere, notably Mayan and Aztec, centuries before any European contacts. The term used is Xicalcoliuhqui, stemming from Nahuatl language, but is applied today to all mesoamerican motifs all over the continent.

== Gallery ==
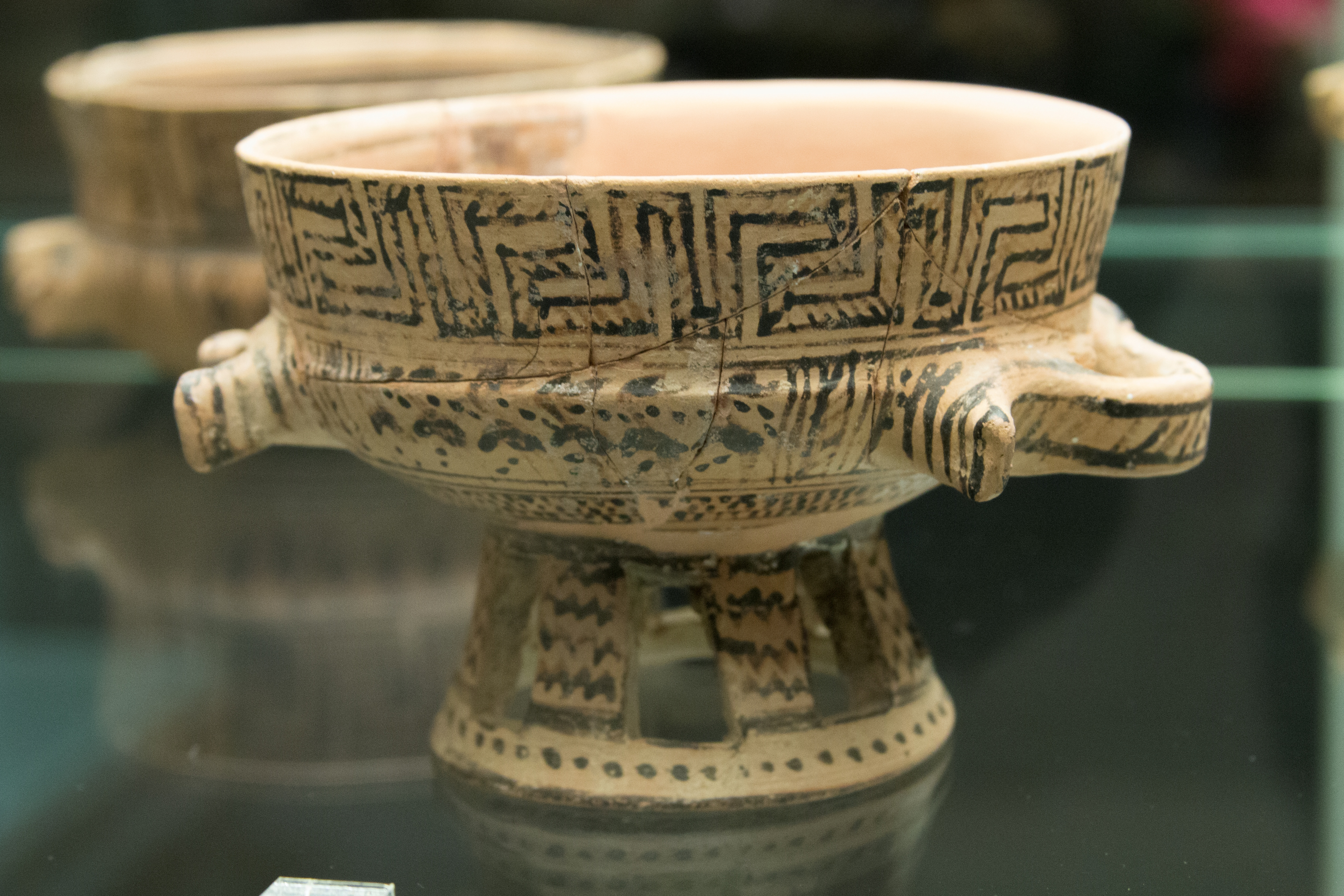
Geometric bowl decorated with a meander, 730–720 BC, ceramic, Kinský Palace, Prague, Czech Republic

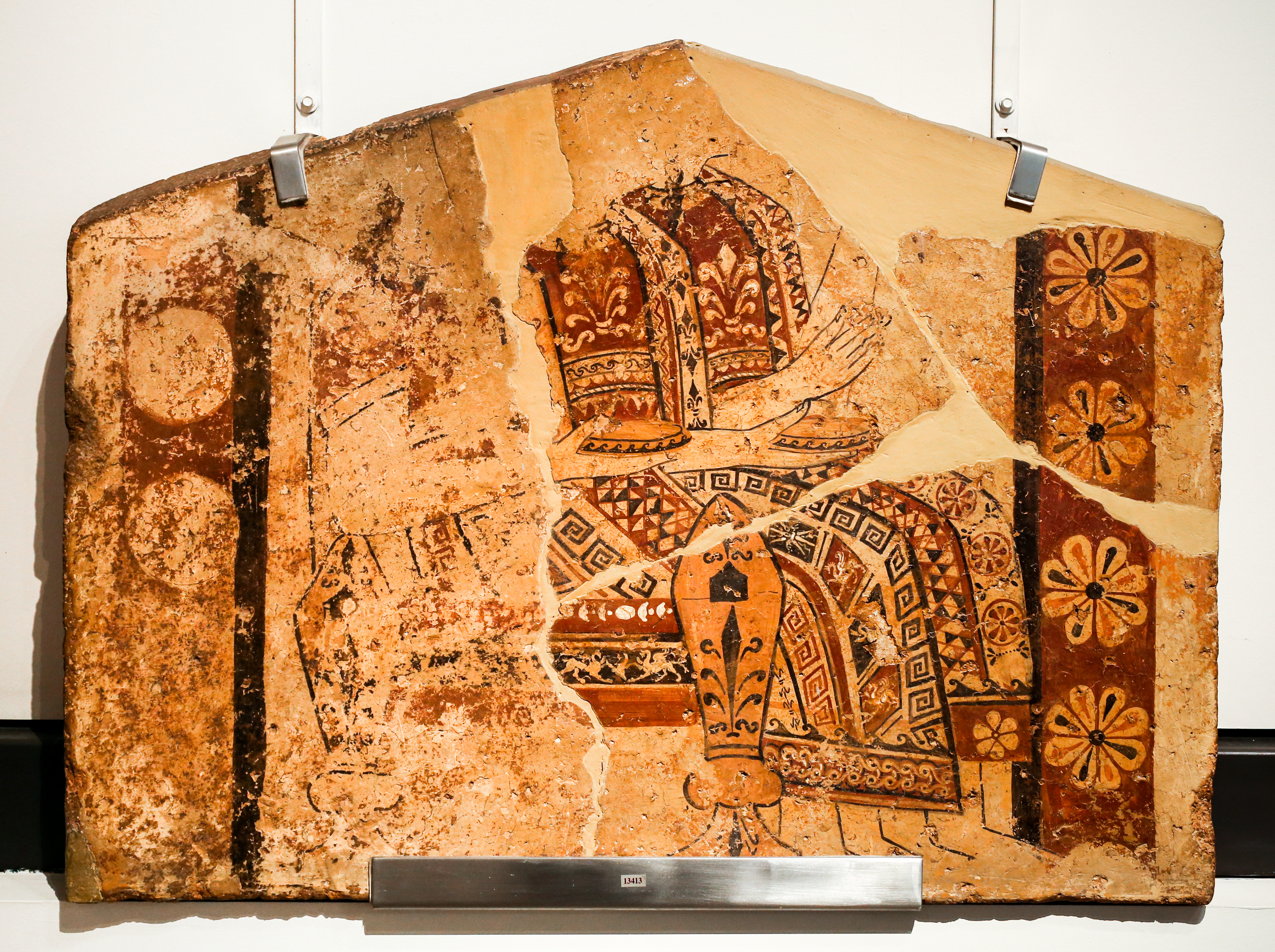
Ancient Greek metope with three women that have meanders on their clothes, c.640 BC, terracotta, National Archaeological Museum, Athens

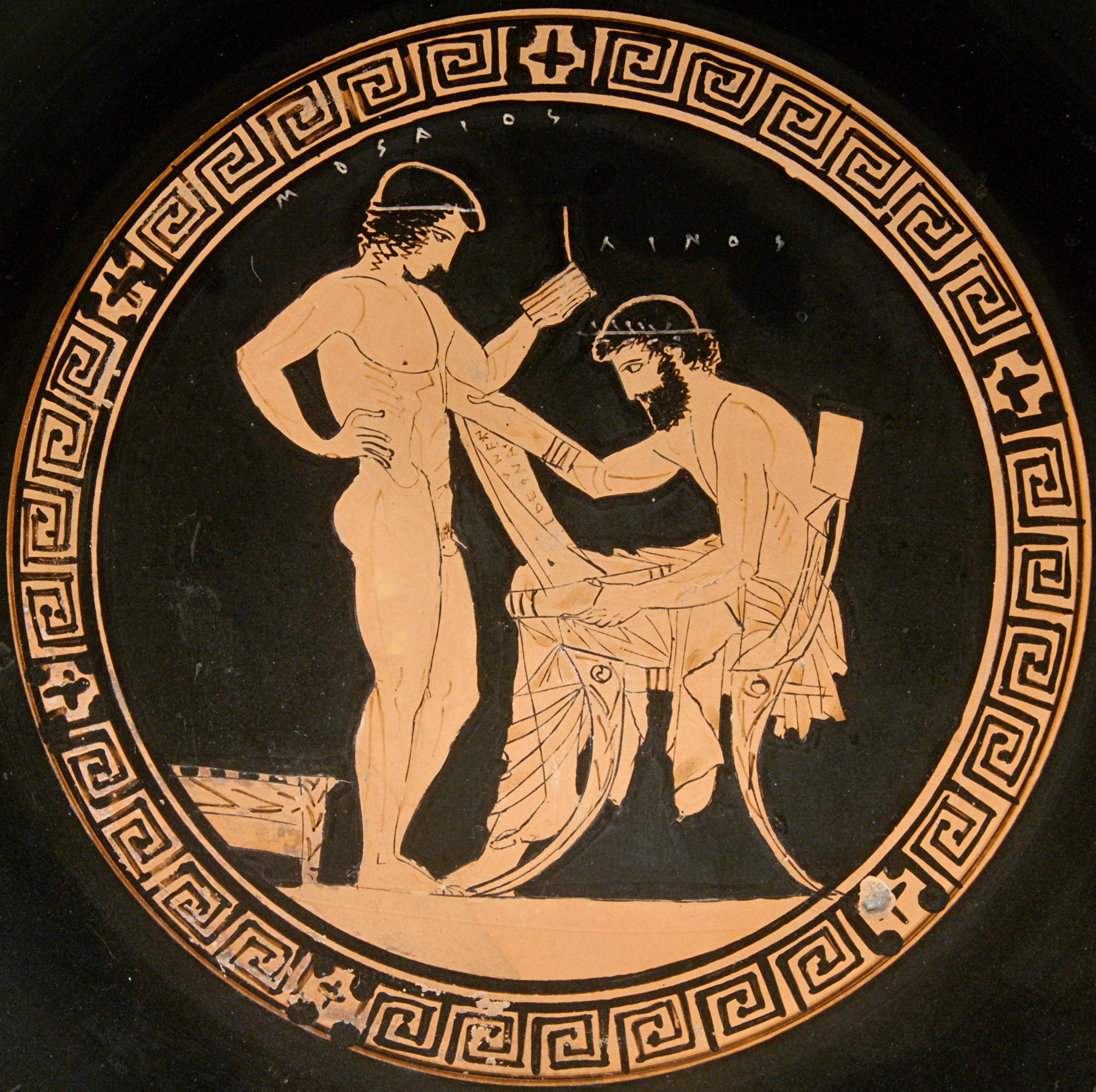
A typical Attic red-figure cup with meander pattern at borders, by the Eretria Painter, c. 440–435 BC, red-figure pottery, Louvre

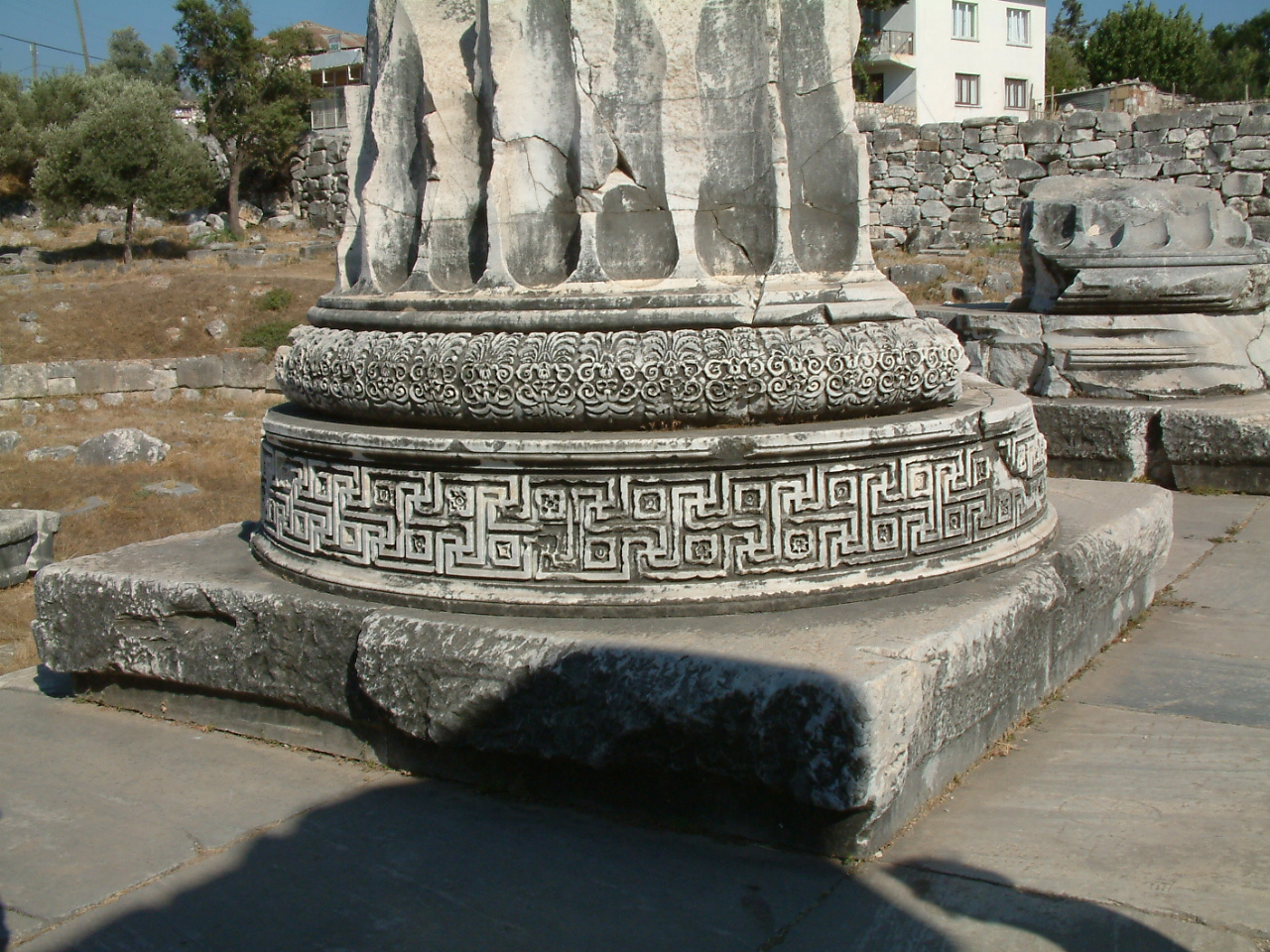
Ancient Greek meanders on the base of a column from the ruins of the Temple of Apollo at Didyma, Turkey, unknown architect or sculptor, c.300-150 BC

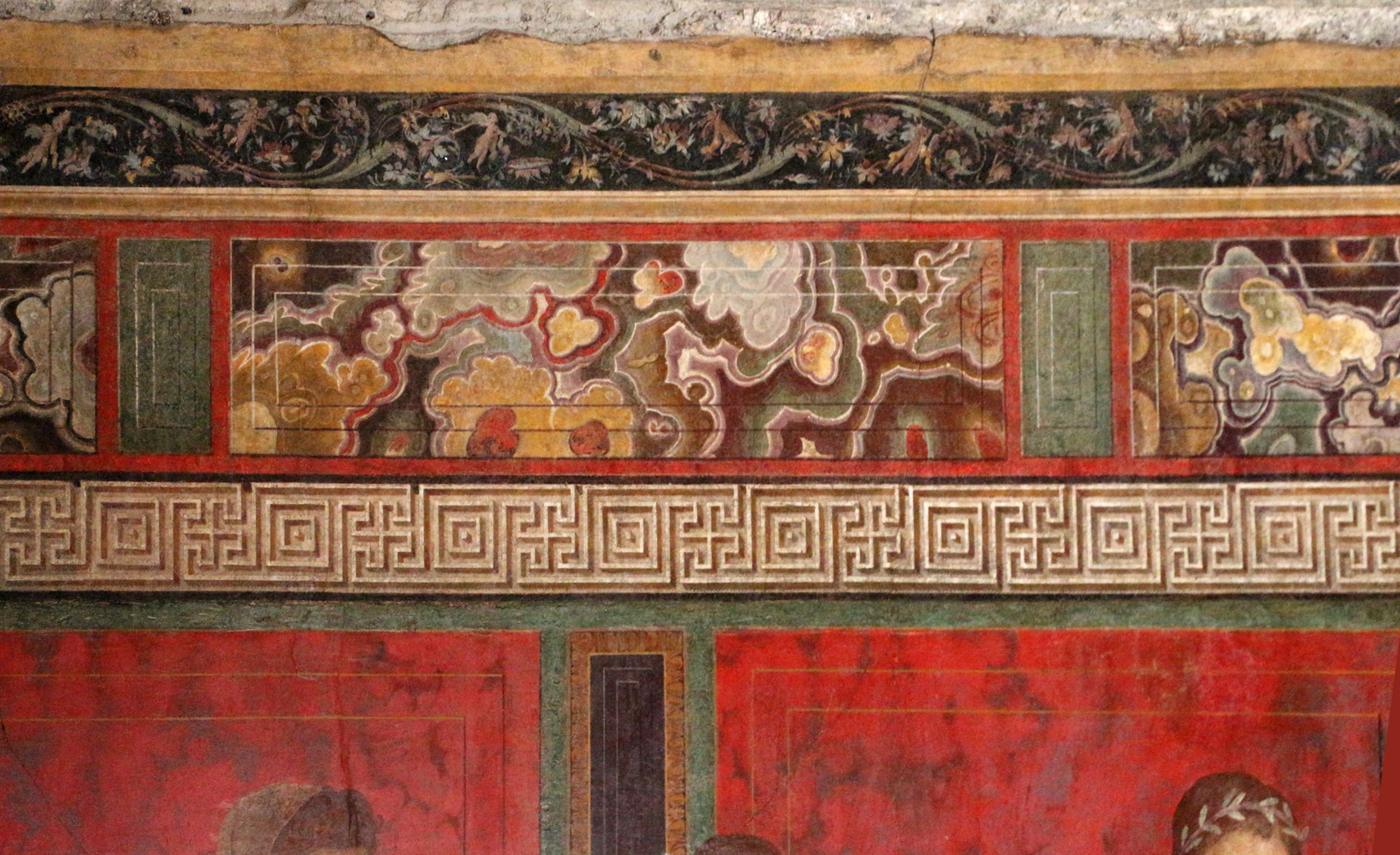
Roman meander on a fresco in the Villa of the Mysteries, Pompeii, Italy, unknown painter, 1st century BC

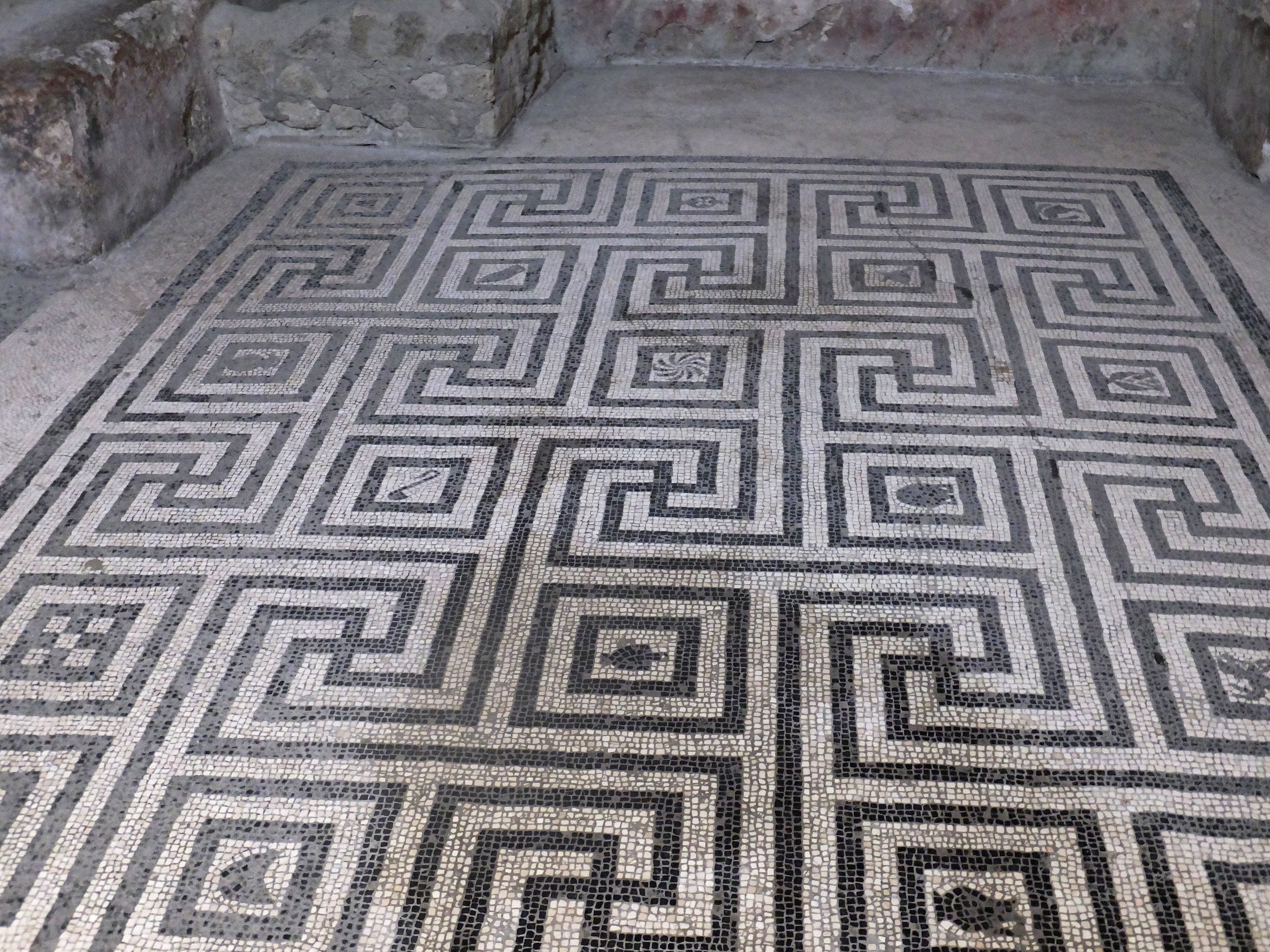
Roman meander mosaic of a tepidarium, Herculaneum, Italy, unknown architect, unknown date

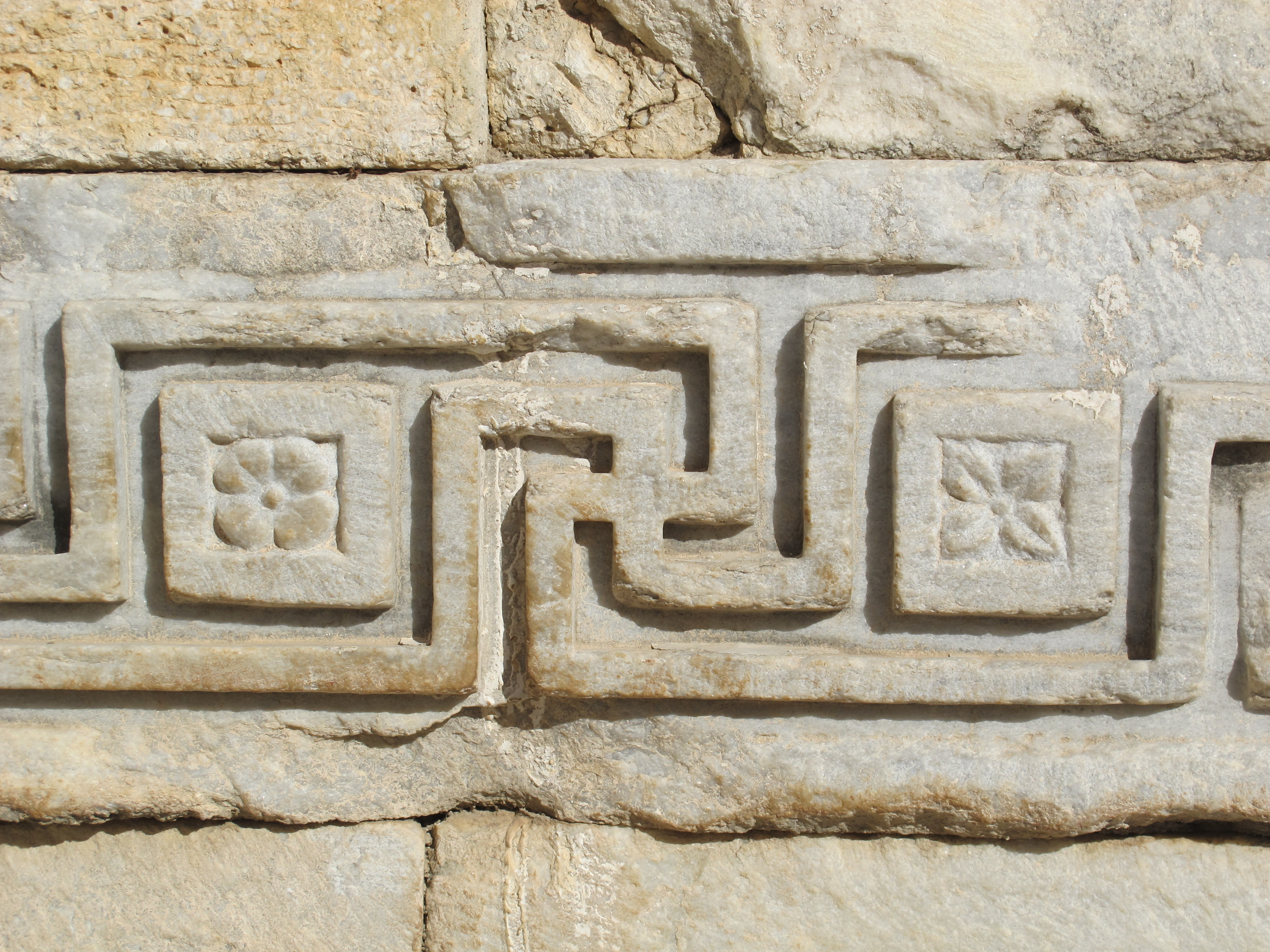
Roman meander on the Temple of Hadrianus, Ephesus, Turkey, unknown architect or sculptor, 117-118 AD

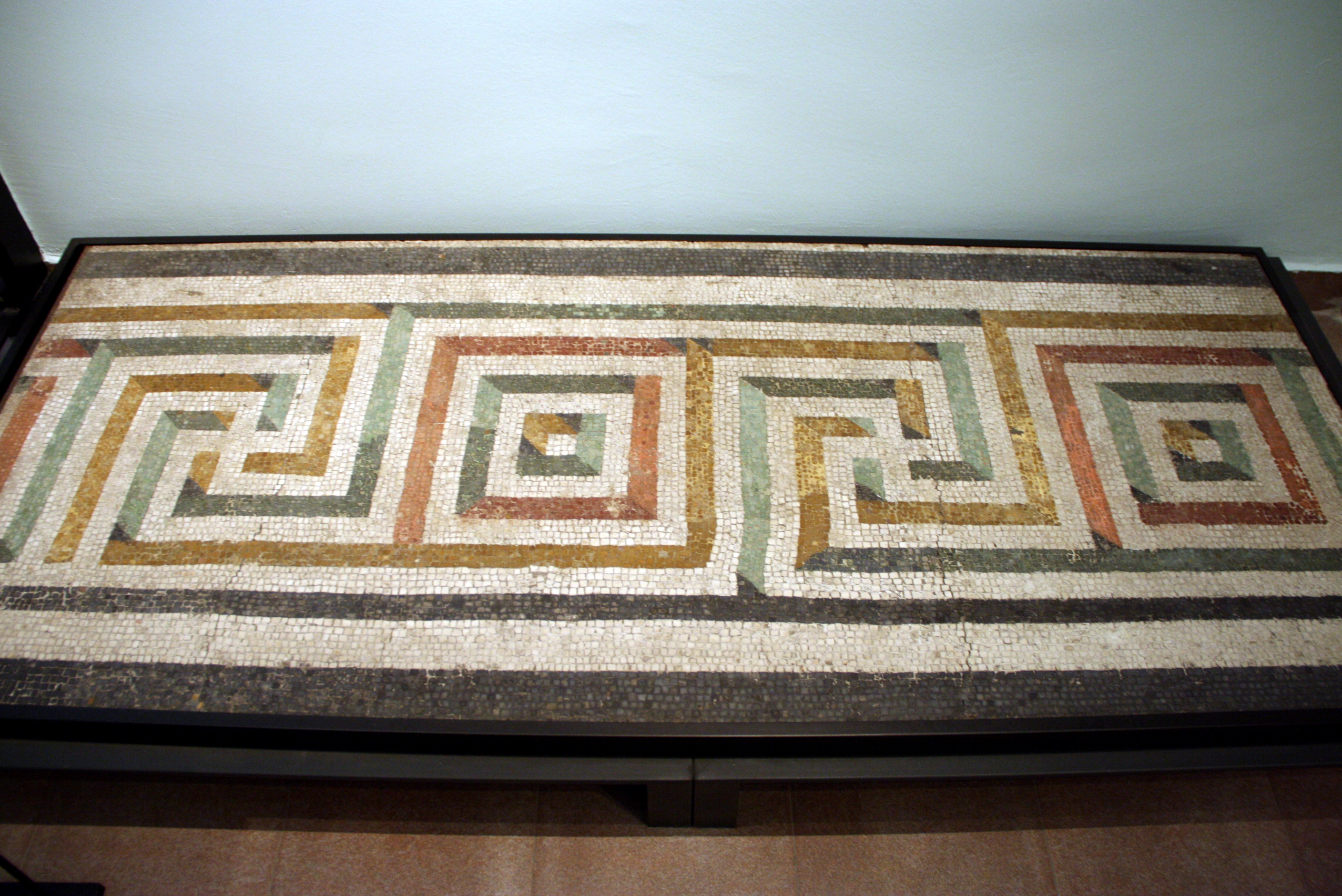
Roman meander on a mosaic, 1st century BC, Archaeological Museum of Milan, Italy

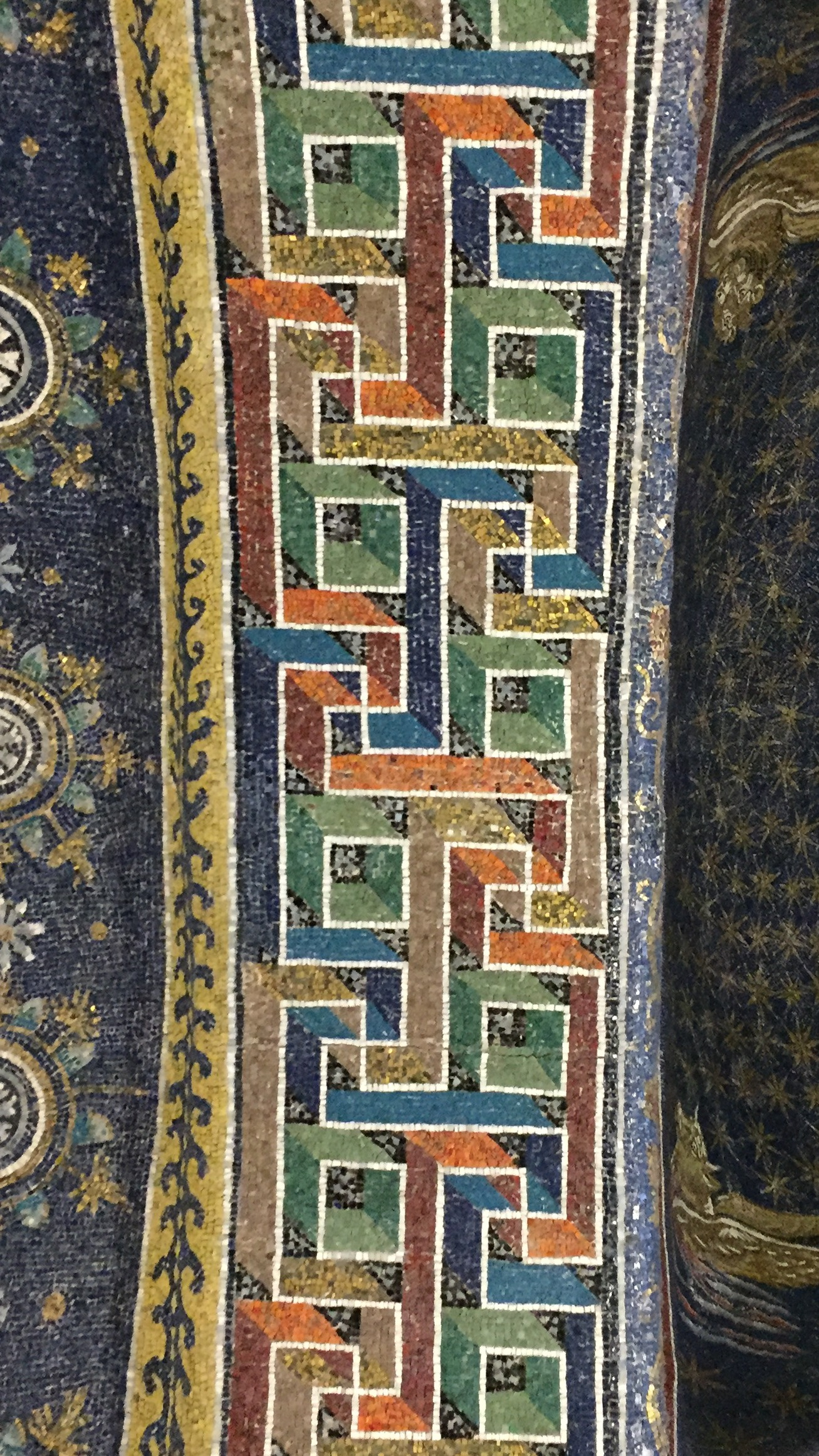
Colorful late Roman-early Byzantine meander in the Mausoleum of Galla Placidia, Ravenna, Italy, unknown architect or craftsman, 425-450

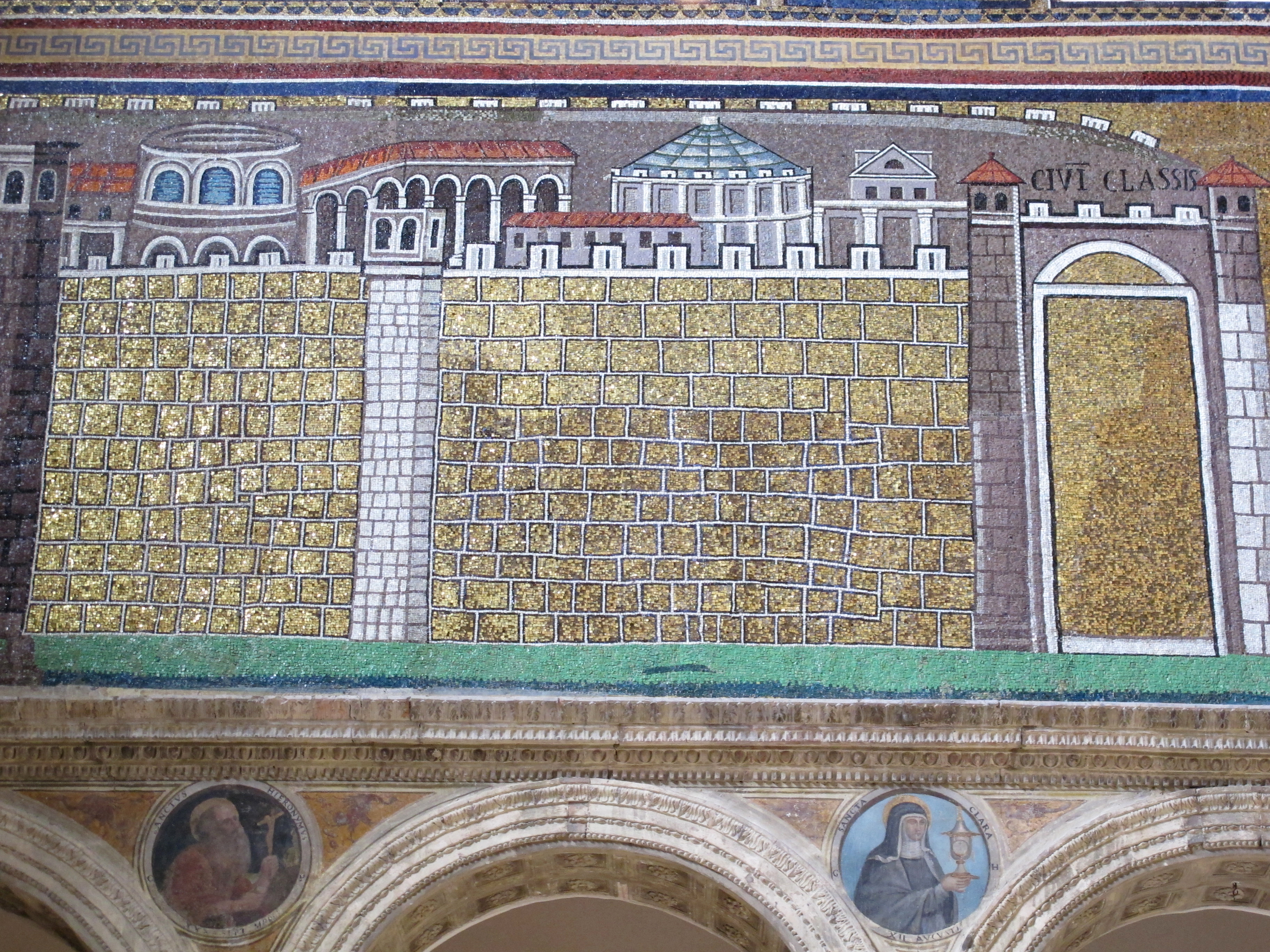
Byzantine mosaic meander in the Basilica of Sant'Apollinare Nuovo, Ravenna, Italy, unknown architect or craftsman, c.500, with later alterations from c.560

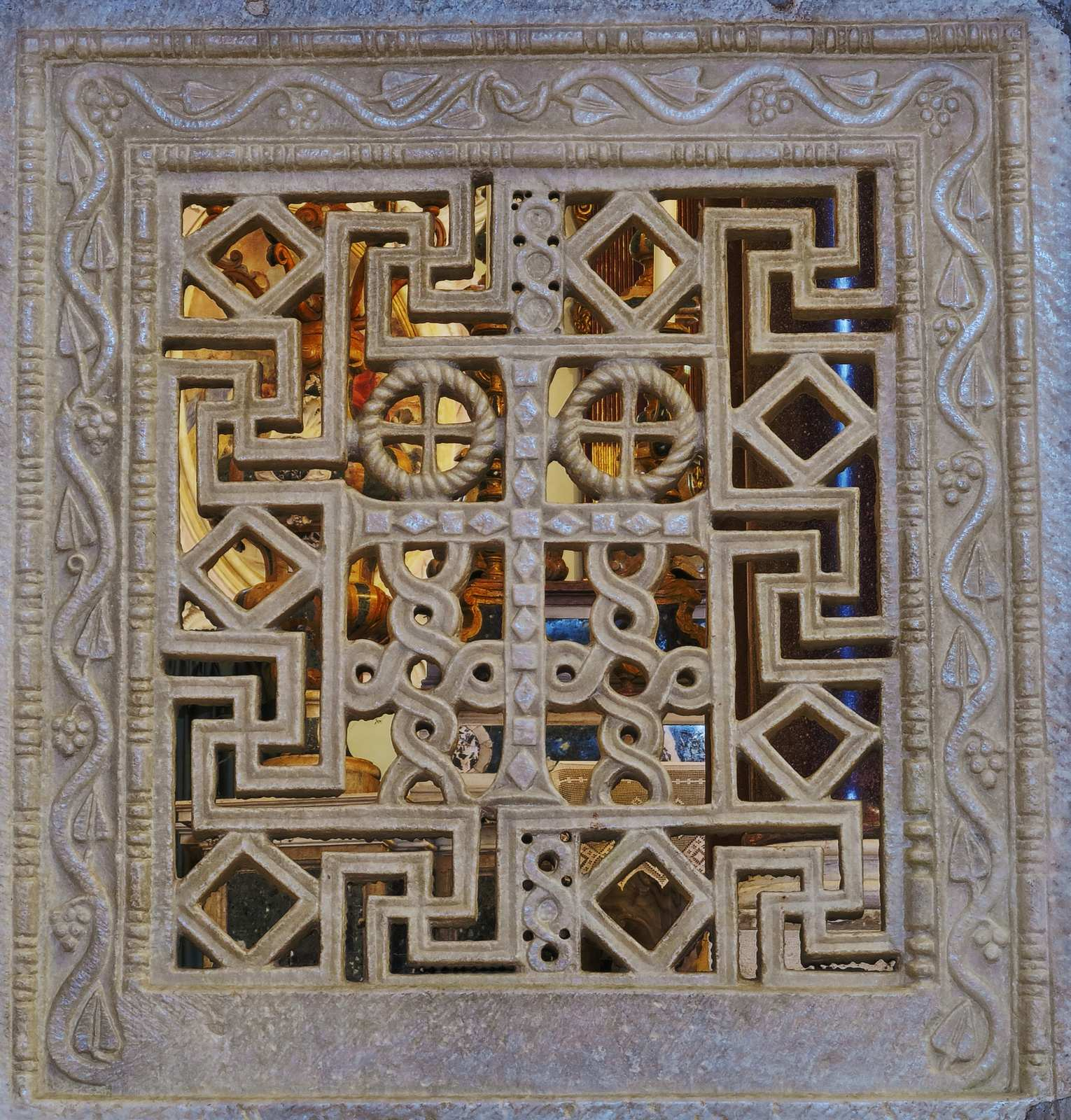
Byzantine meander mixed with diamonds, on the boarder of a pierced marble panel from the Basilica of Sant'Apollinare Nuovo, Ravenna, unknown architect or sculptor, 6th century

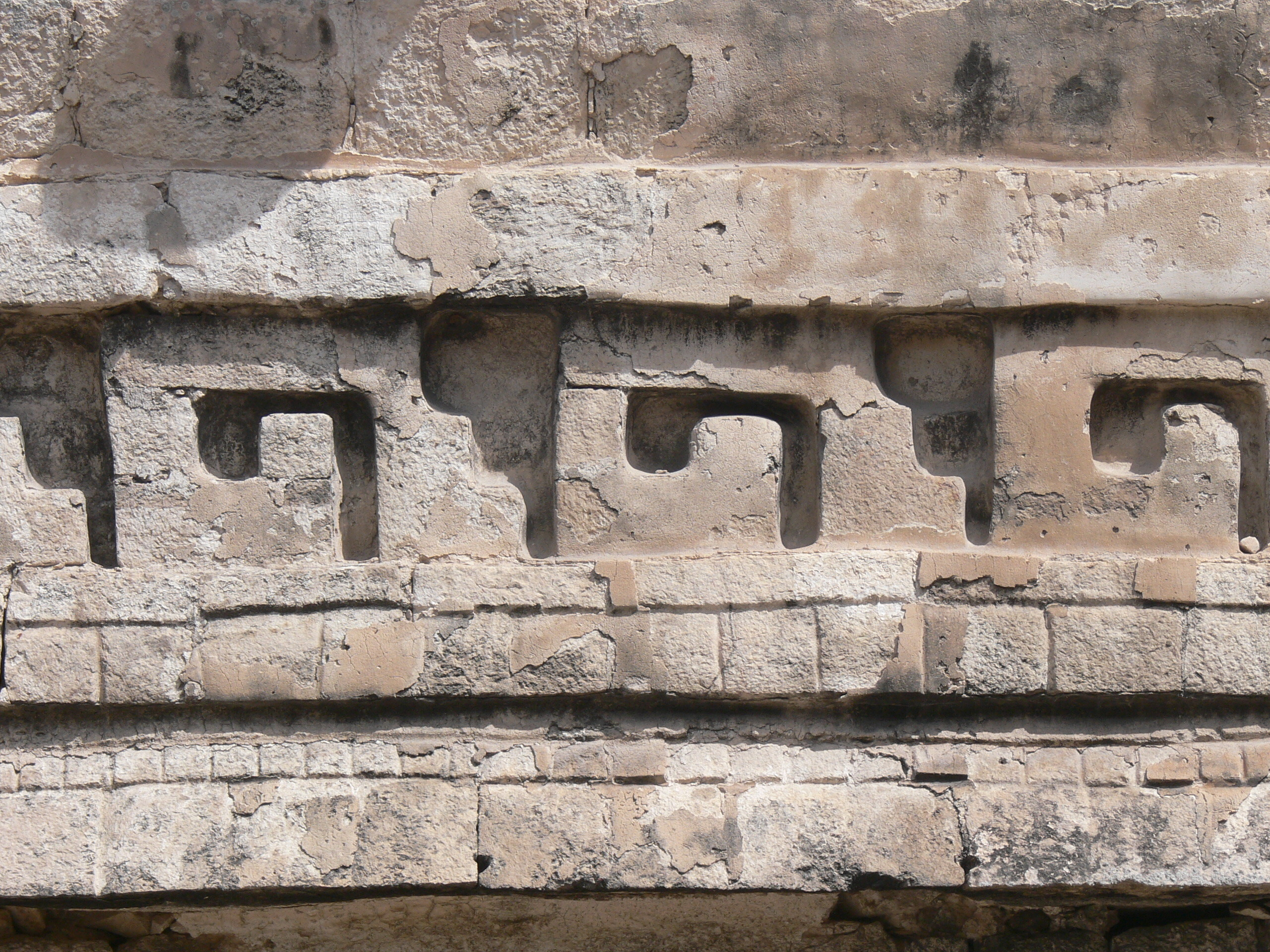
Mayan meander from Chichen Itza, Mexico, unknown architect, 750–1050

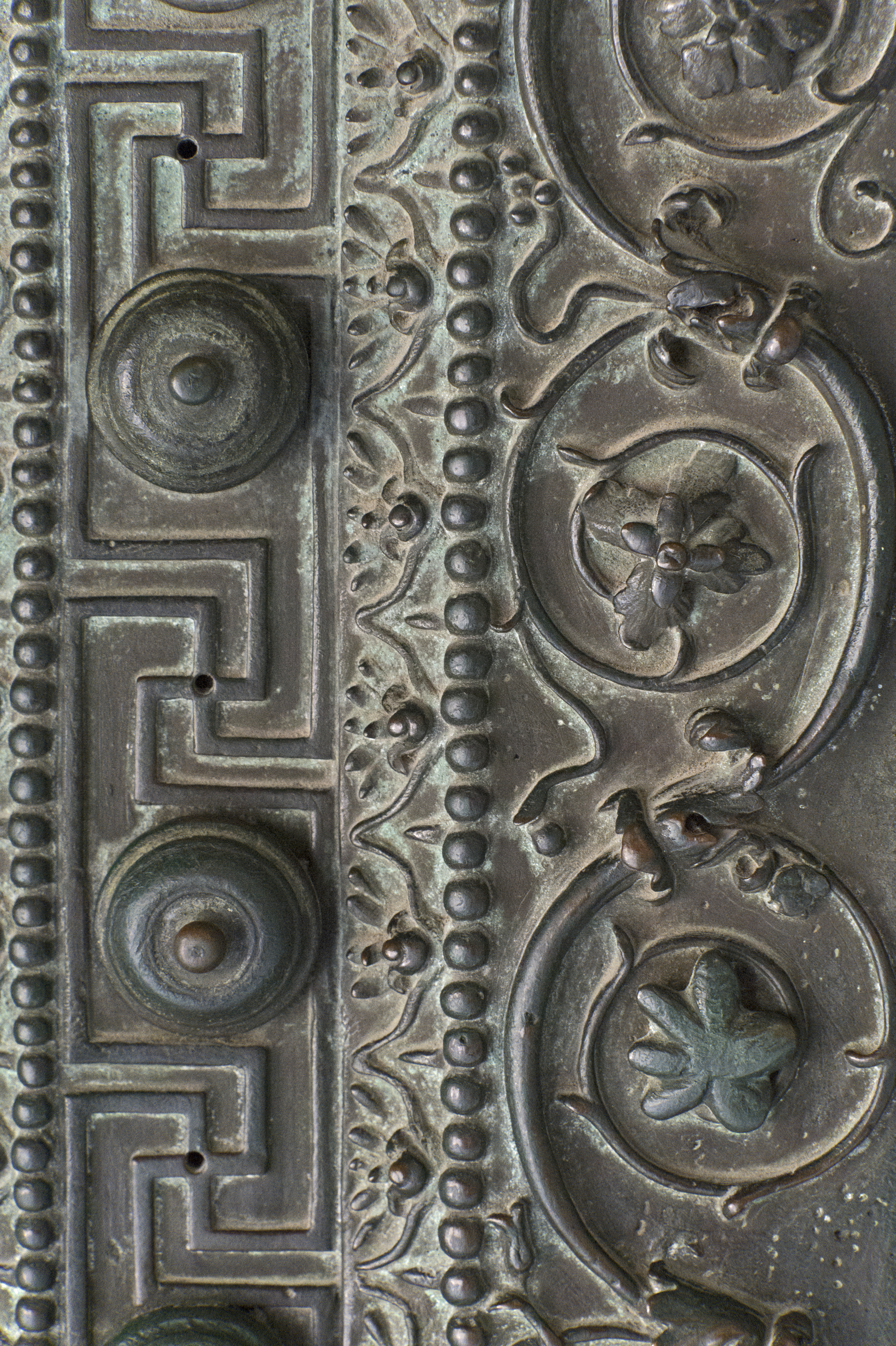
Byzantine meander on the south-west door, unknown architect or sculptor, 829-842, bronze, Hagia Sophia, Istanbul, Turkey

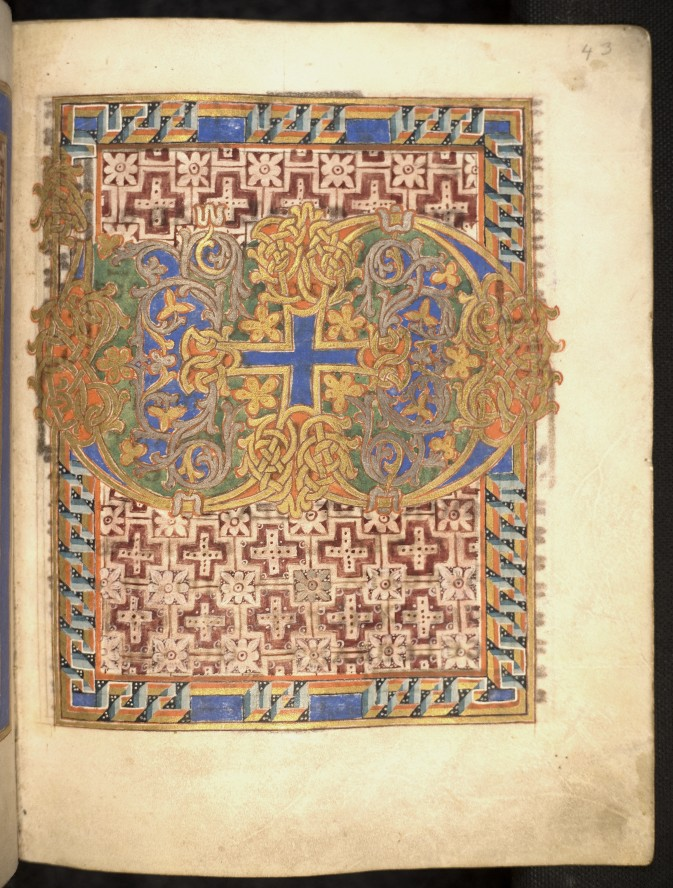
Romanesque meanders on a page from the Petershausener Sakramentar, 960-980, tempera colors, gold paint, gold leaf, and ink on parchment, Heidelberg University Library, Heidelberg, Germany

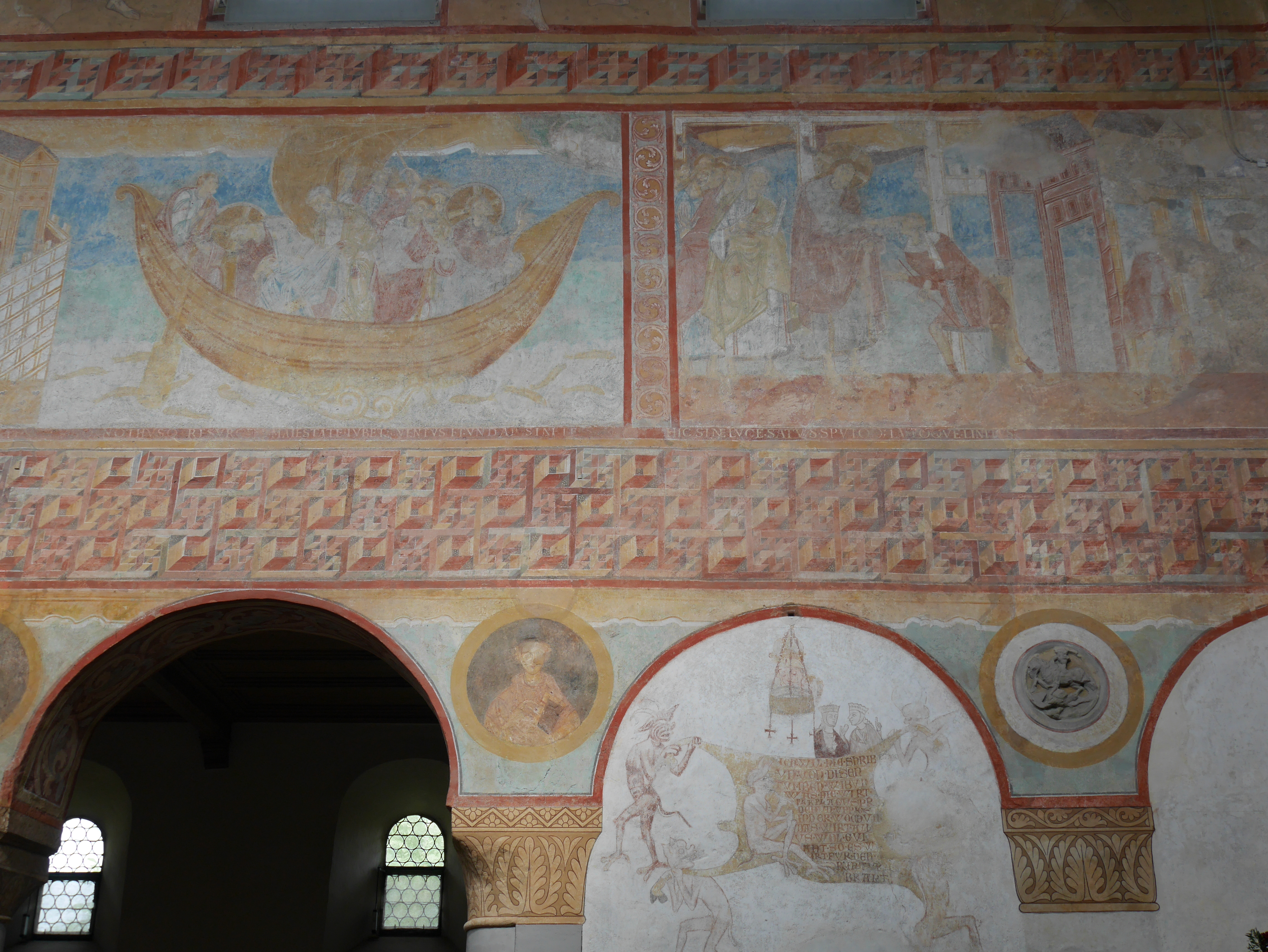
Romanesque meanders, probably the late 10th century, fresco, Church of Saint George, Reichenau, Germany

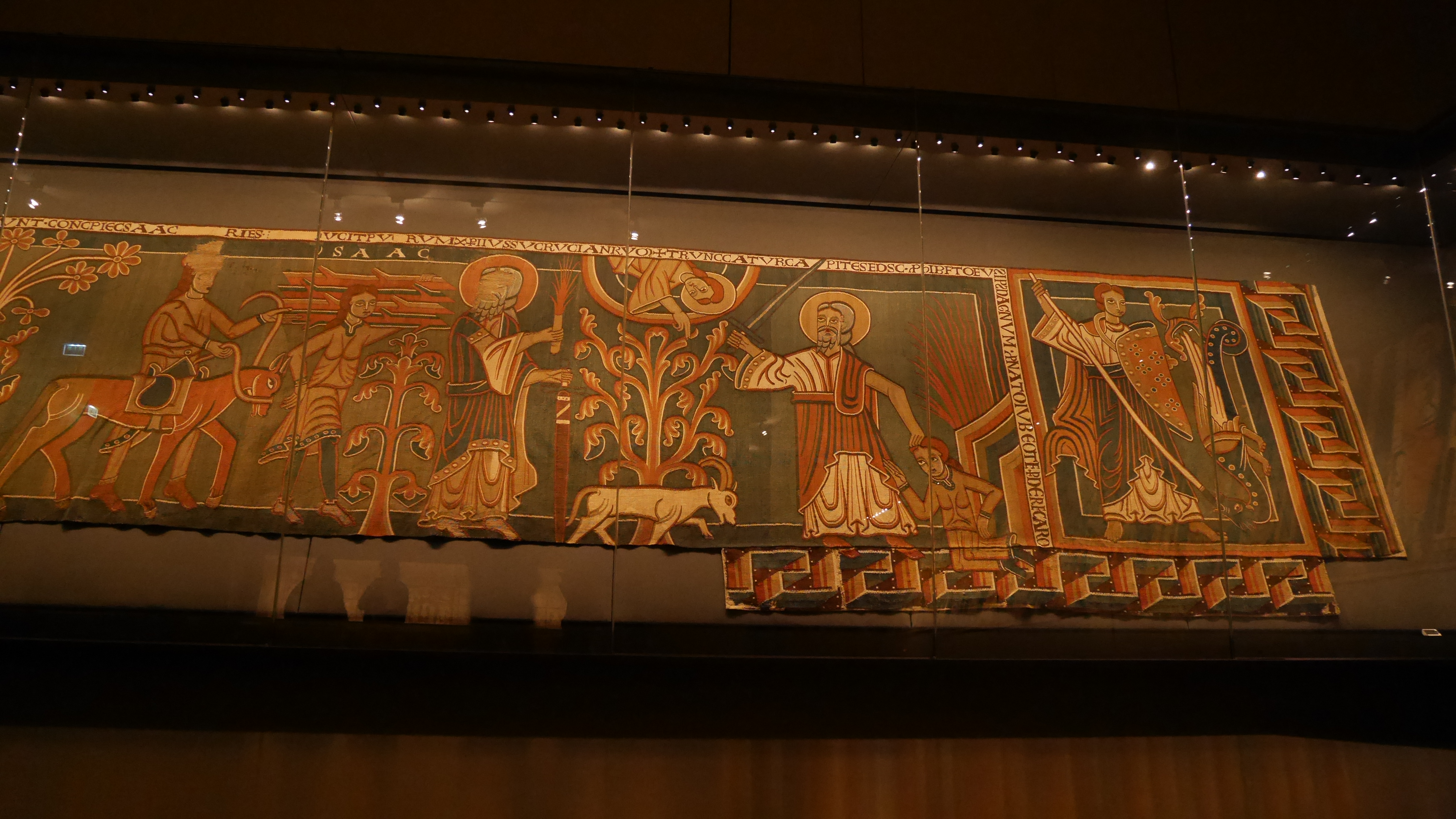
Romanesque meander of a tapestry with Saint Michael fighting with the dragon, 1146-1155, linen yarn, wool, linen, Halberstadt Cathedral Treasure, Halberstadt, Germany

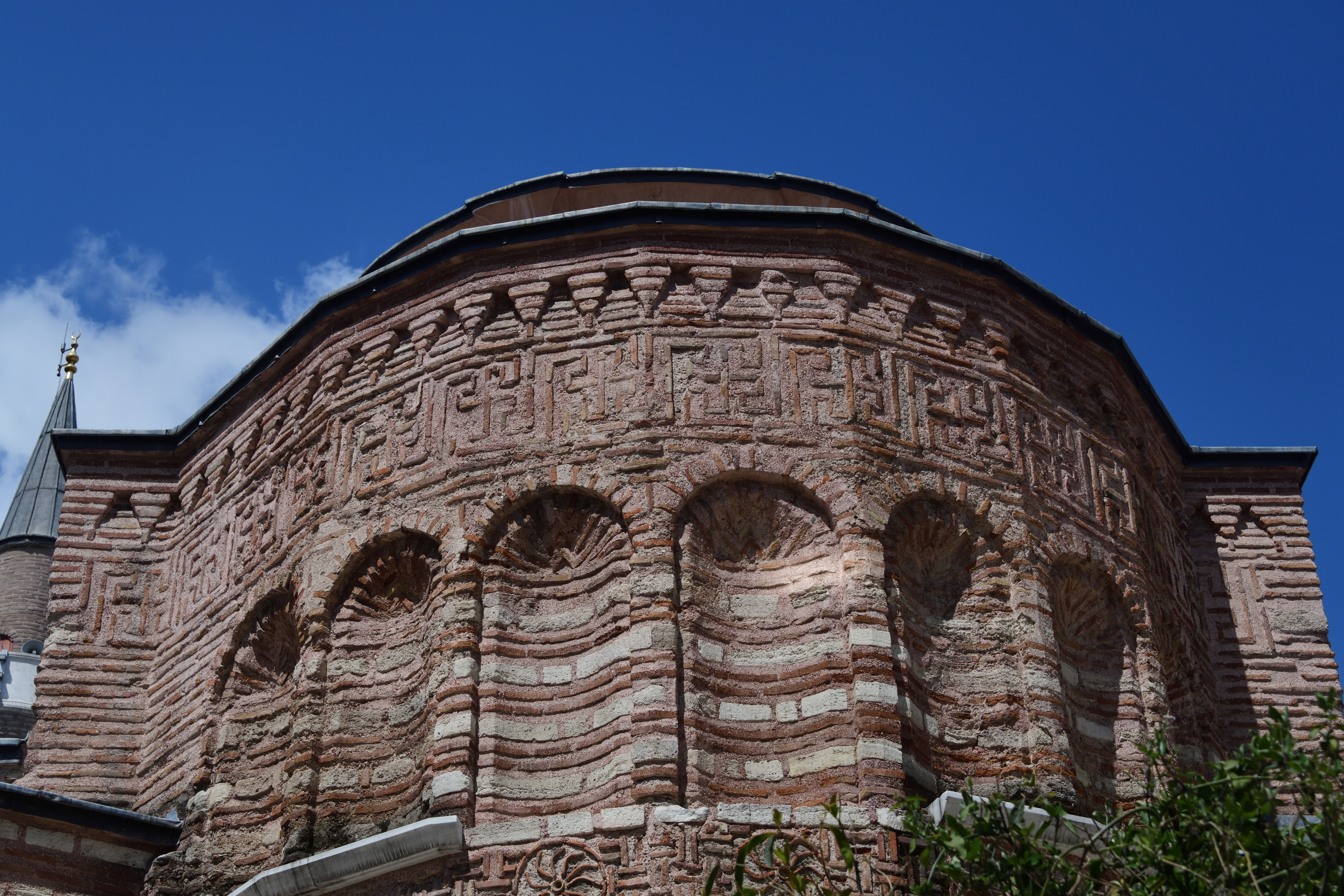
Byzantine brick meander on the facade of the Church of the Thetokos tou Libos of Constantine Lips, currently the Fenari Isa Mosque, Istanbul, unknown architect, 907, refounded in 1287

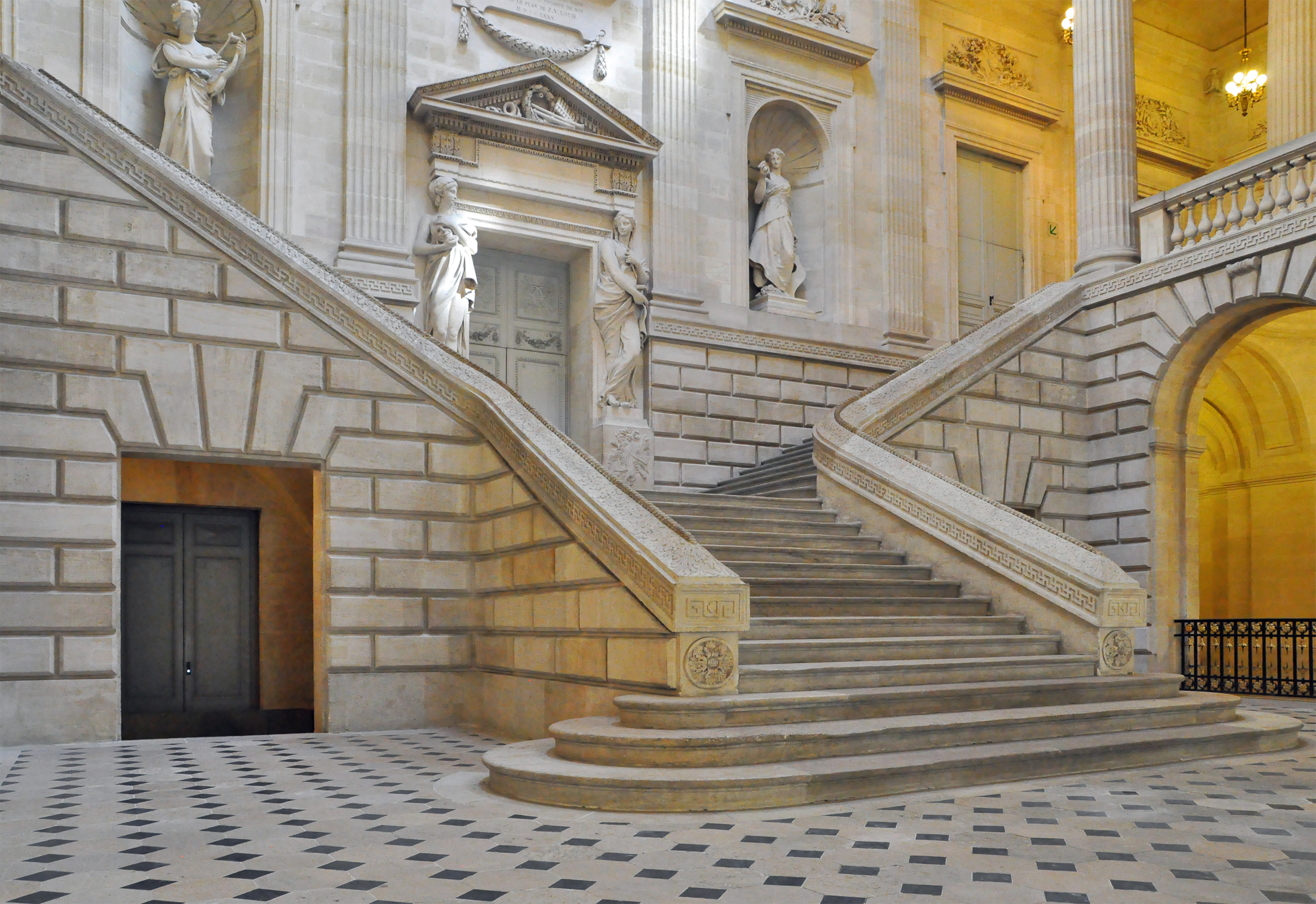
Neoclassical meander border of the railing from the stairway of the Grand Theater of Bordeaux, Bordeaux, France, by Victor Louis, 1777-1780

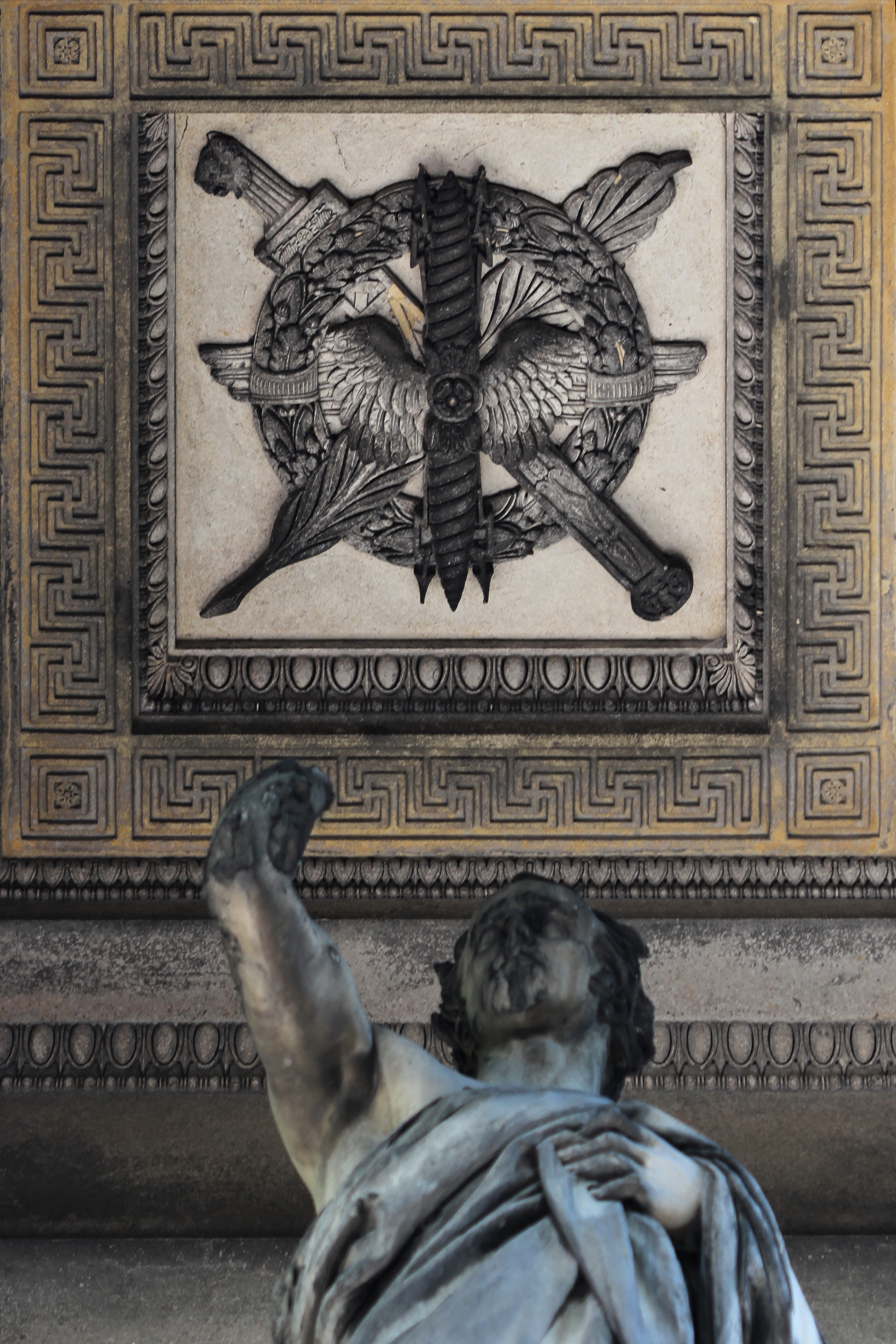
Neoclassical meander border on the ceiling of the Grave of Foy, Père Lachaise Cemetery, Paris, by Pierre Jean David, 1831

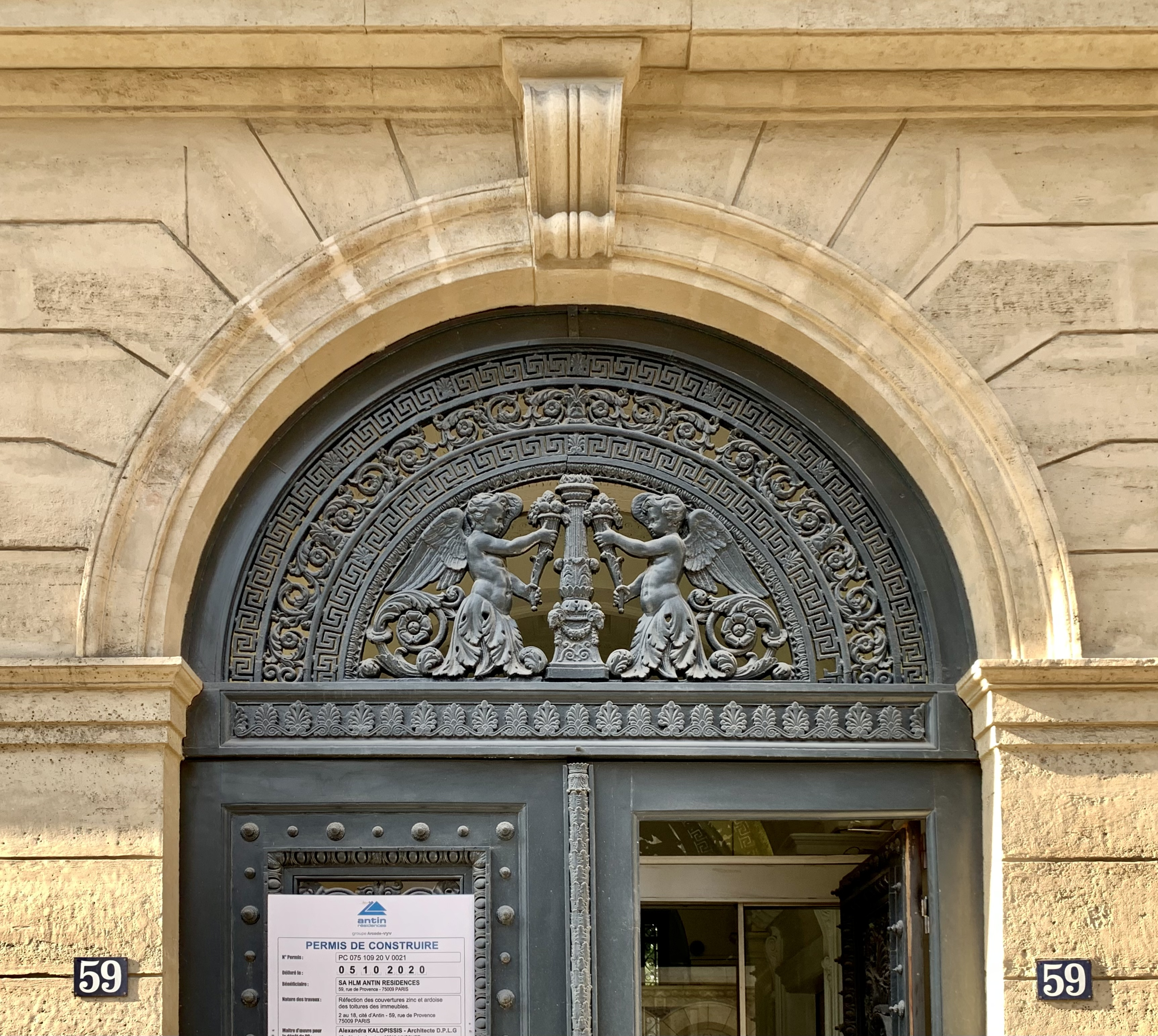
Neoclassical meanders in the lunette of the Ensemble immobilier de la cité d'Antin (Rue de Provence no. 59), Paris, unknown architect, c. 1850

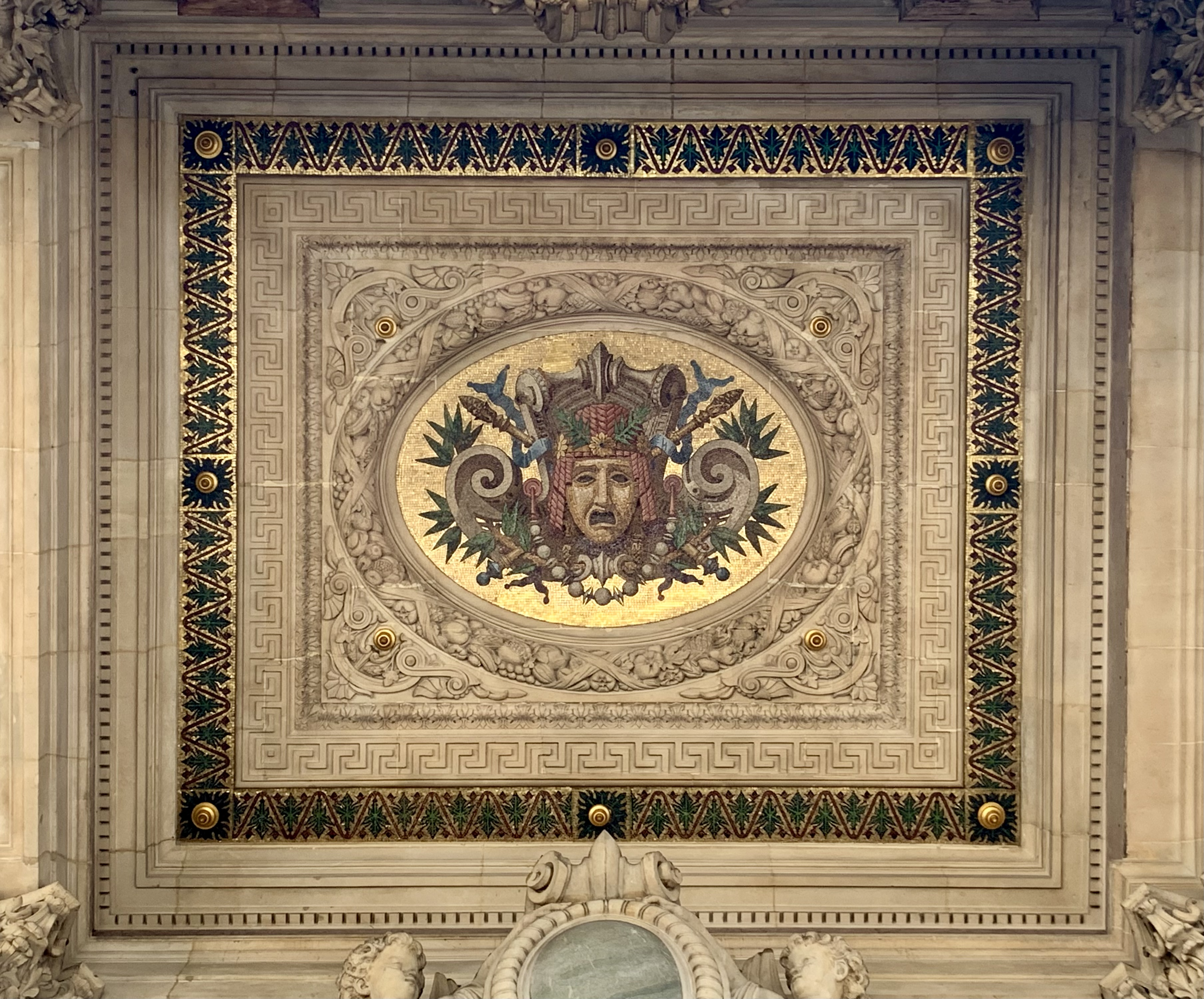
Neoclassical meander border on a ceiling of the Palais Garnier, Paris, by Charles Garnier, 1860–1875

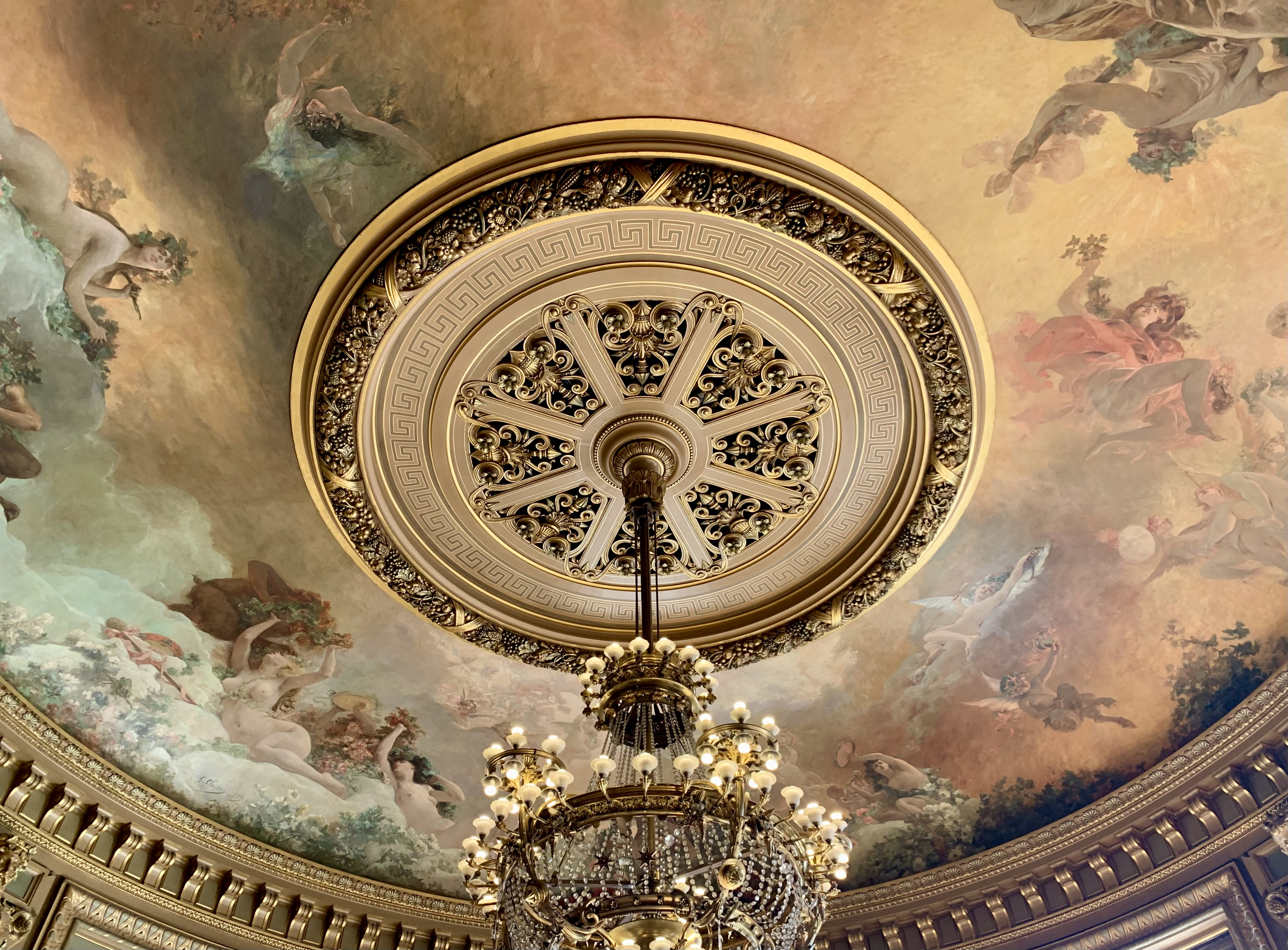
Neoclassical meander border of a ceiling of the Salon du glacier in the Palais Garnier, by Charles Garnier, 1860–1875

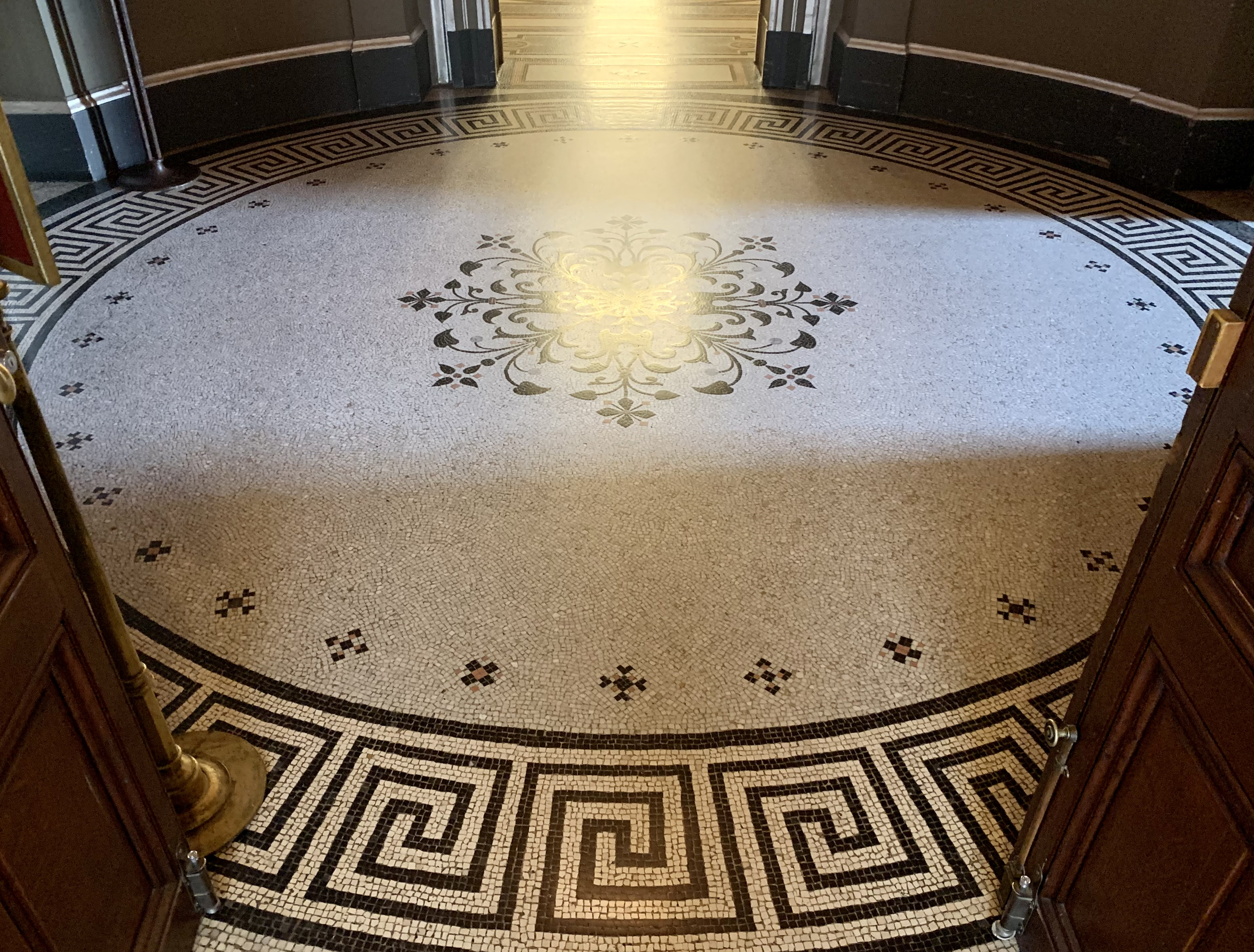
Neoclassical meander border of a floor of the Moon Salon in the Palais Garnier, by Charles Garnier, 1860–1875

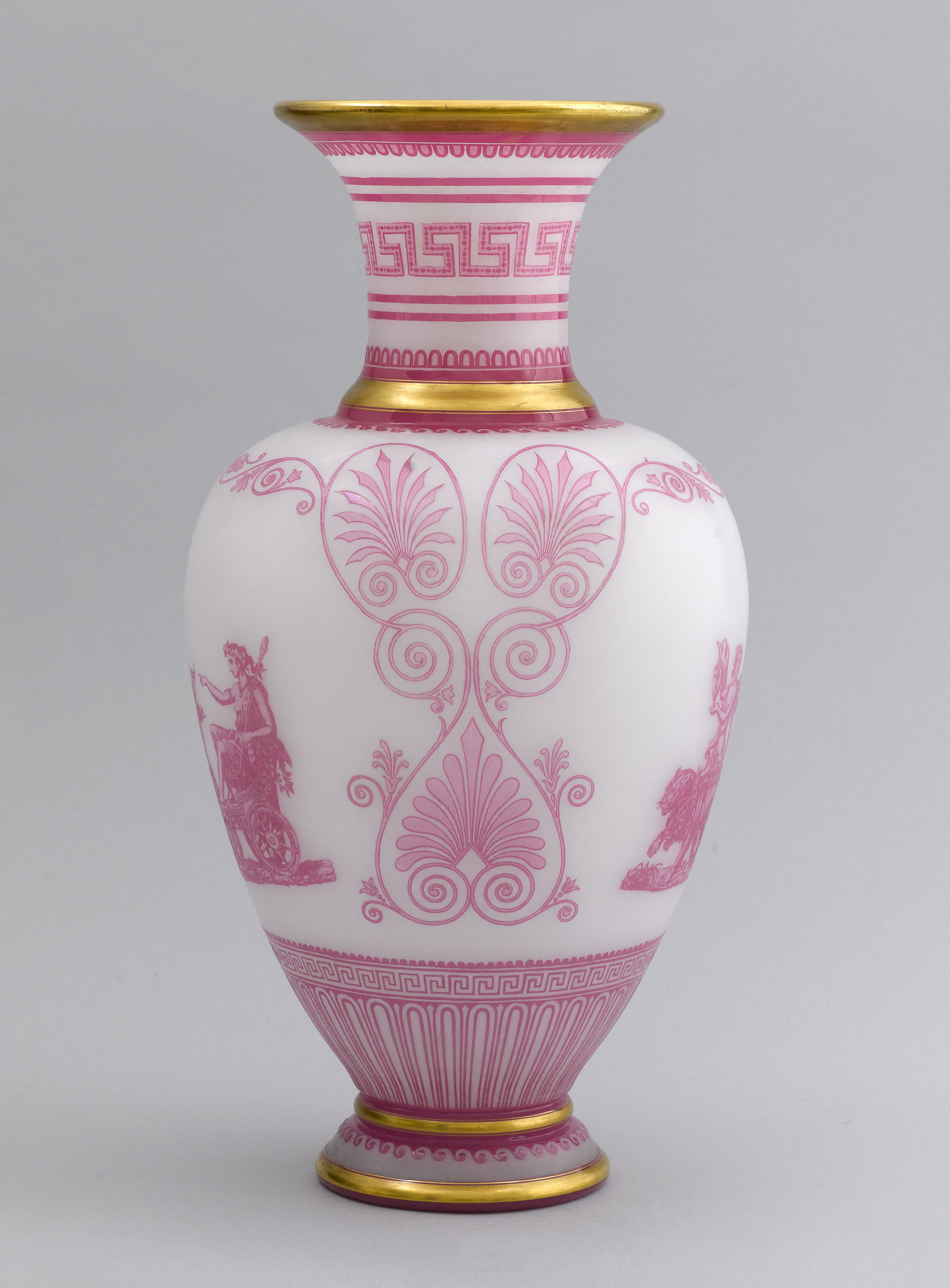
Greek Revival vase with a meander, produced by Baccarat, 1867, crystal and gold, Petit Palais, Paris

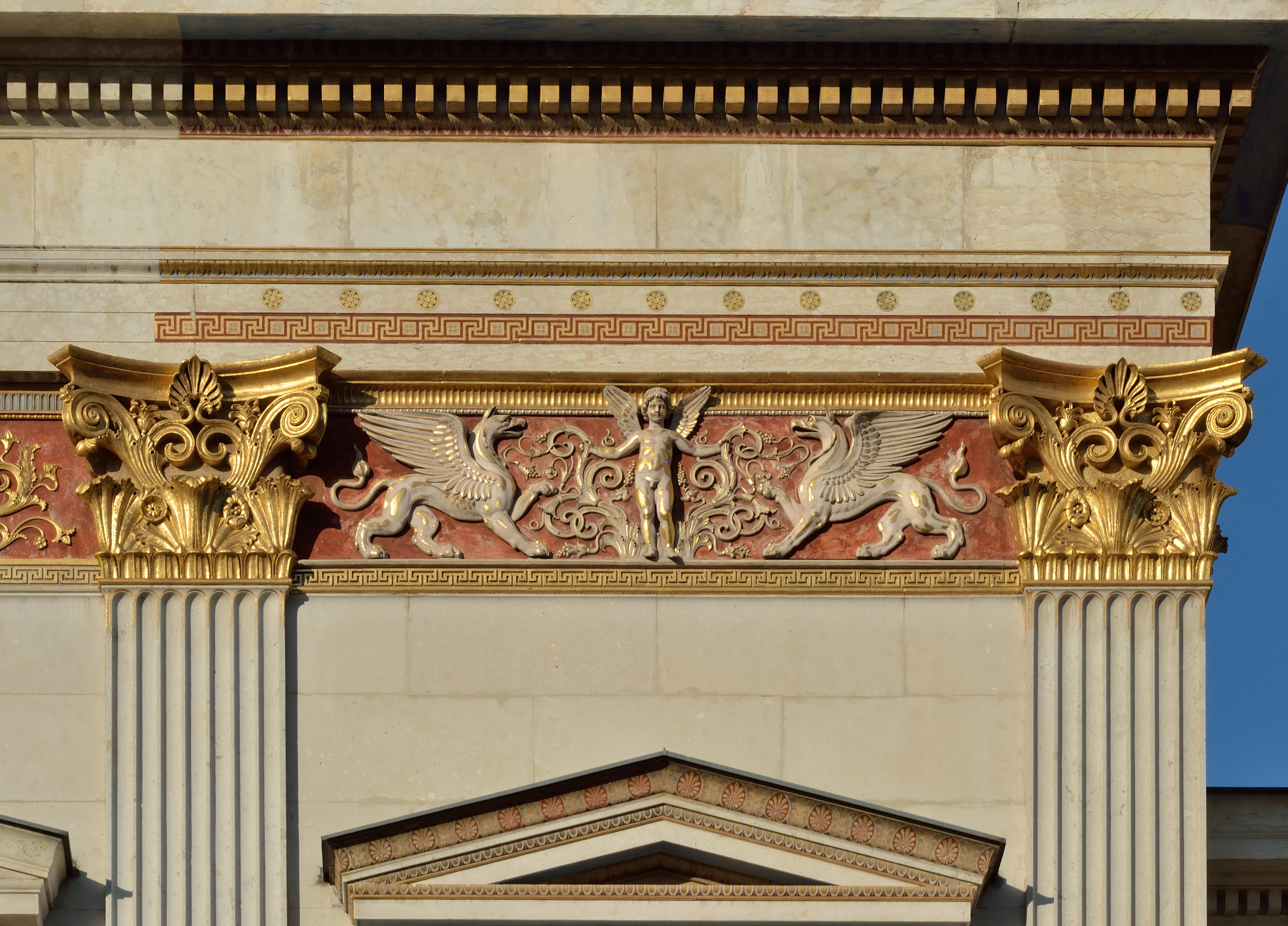
Greek Revival meanders on the Austrian Parliament Building, Vienna, by Theophil von Hansen, 1873-1883

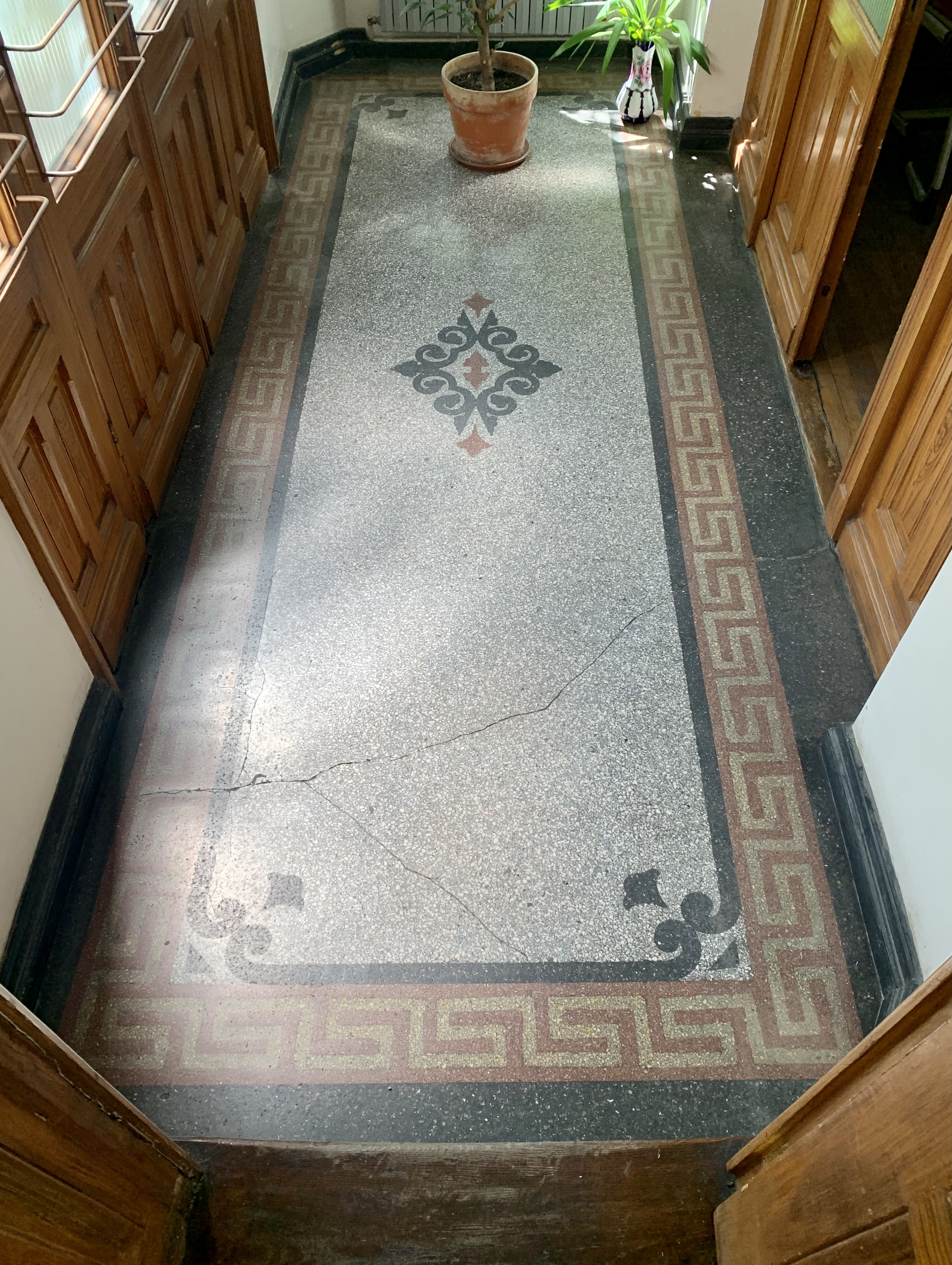
Neoclassical meander on a floor in the Central Girls' School (Strada Icoanei no. 3-5), Bucharest, Romania, by Ion Mincu, 1890

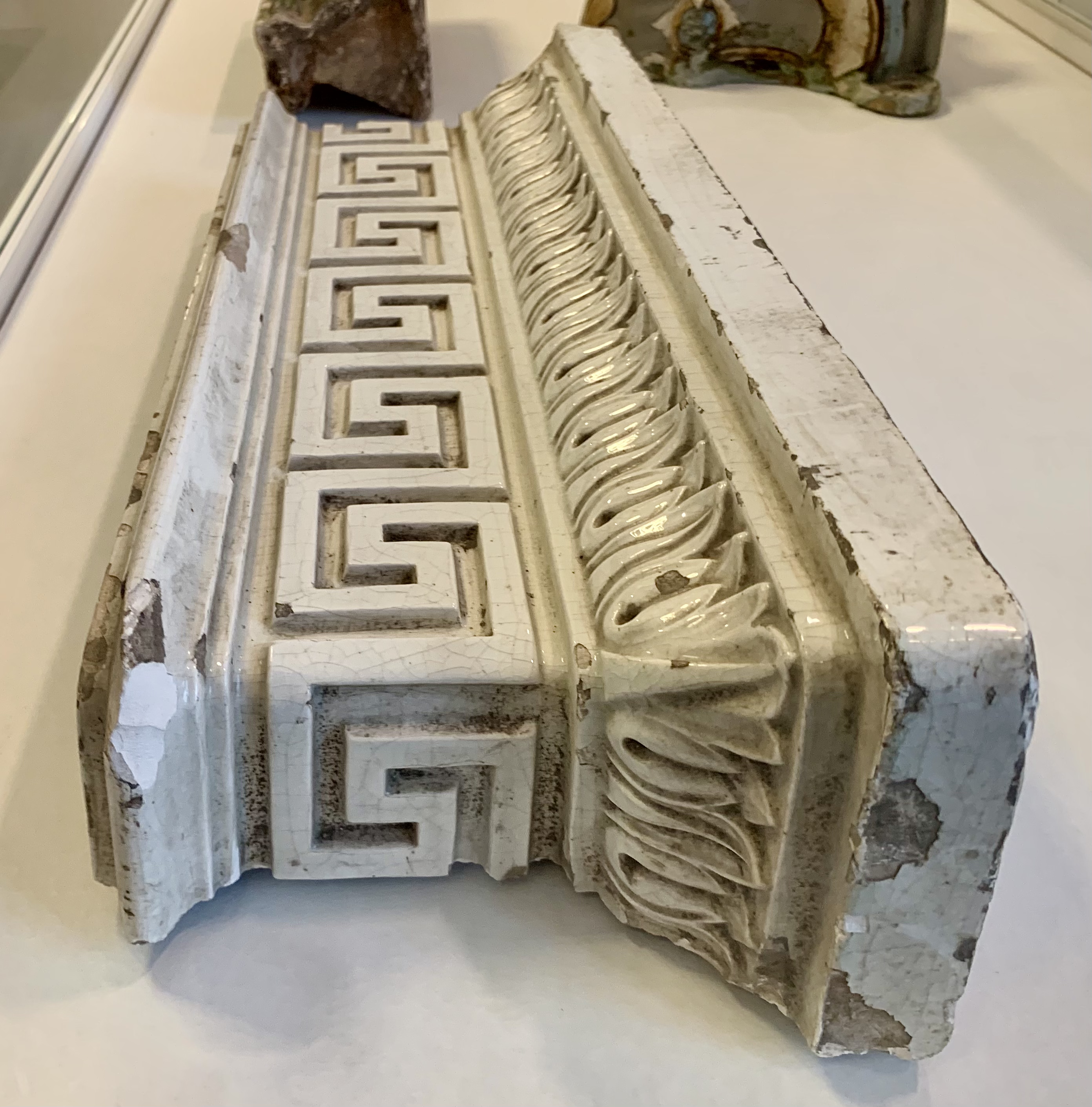
Neoclassical meander on a stove tile from a house in Bucharest, on display during an exhibition in the Bucharest City Hall, unknown designer, c. 1900

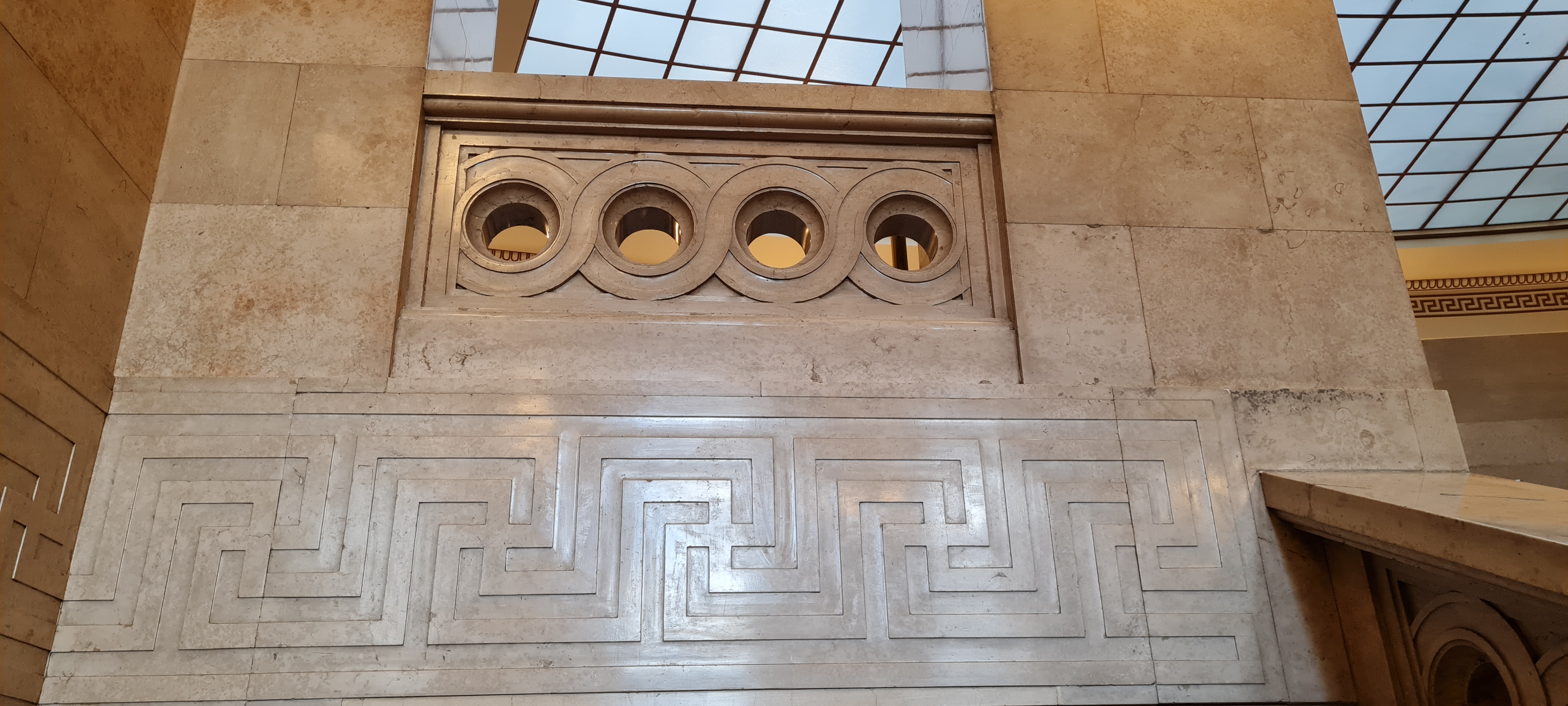
Neoclassical meander on a wall of Stock Exchange Building (Trg hrvatskih velikana no. 3) of Zagreb, Croatia, by Viktor Kovačić, 1927

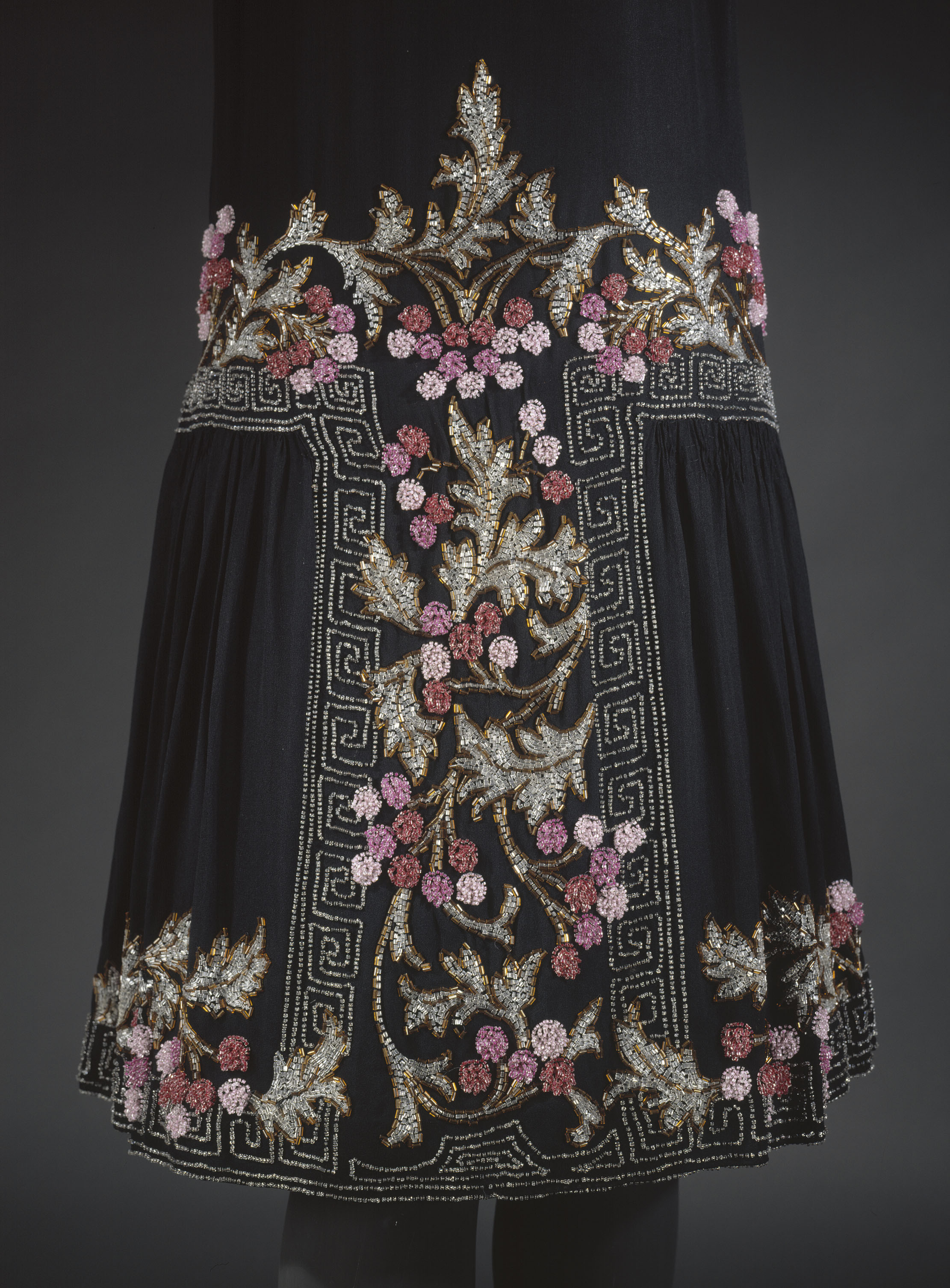
Art Deco dress decorated with meanders, unknown producer, c.1925, georgette, and crochet embroidery, Musée Galliera, Paris

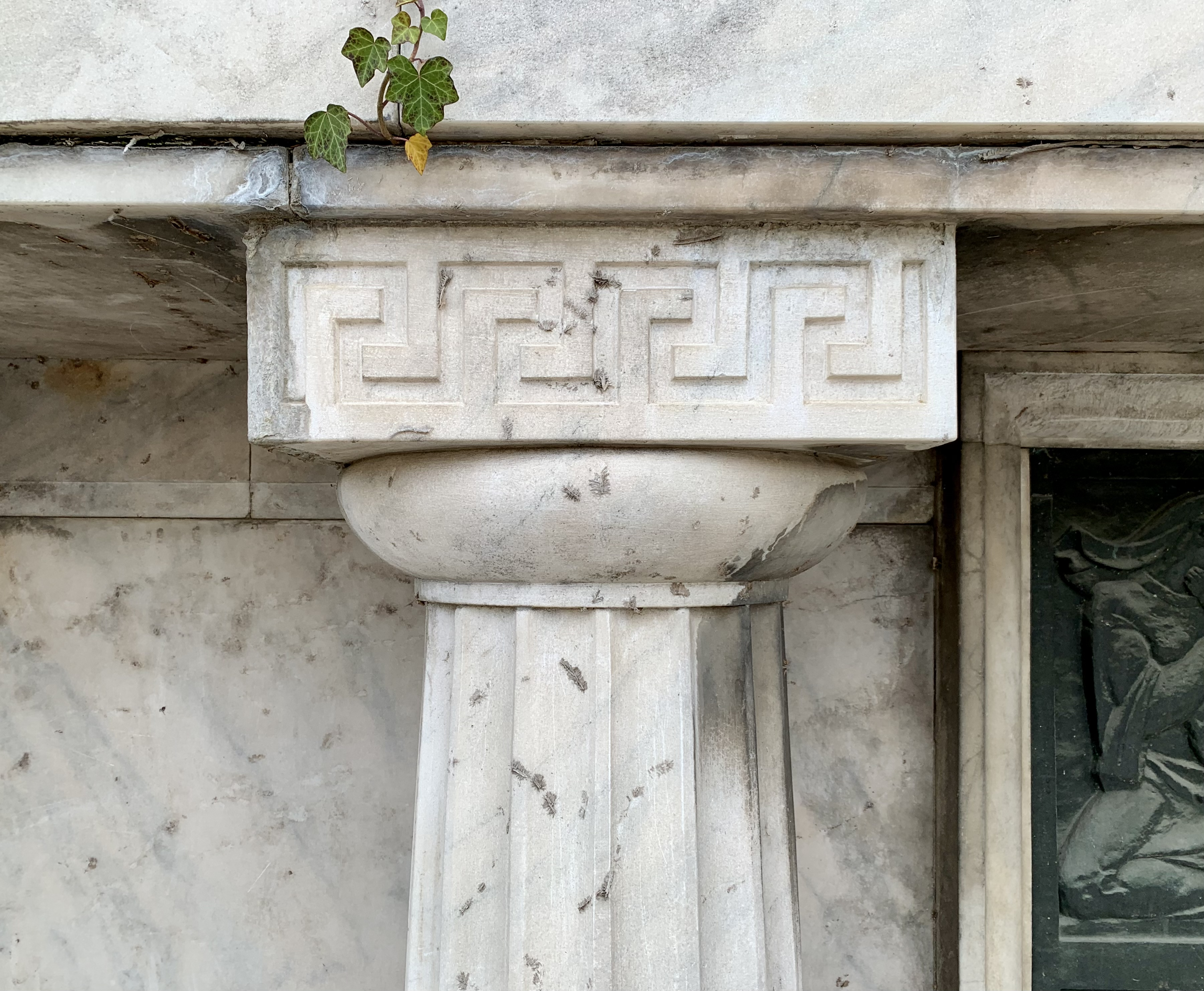
Neoclassical and Art Deco meander on a Doric column capital of the Vasile I. Prodanof family tomb, Bellu Cemetery, Bucharest, unknown architect, c. 1930

== See also ==
- Mezine
- Vitruvian scroll
- Labyrinth

== Sources ==
- Celac, Mariana; Carabela, Octavian; Marcu-Lapadat, Marius (2017). Bucharest Architecture - an annotated guide. Order of Architects of Romania. ISBN 978-973-0-23884-6.
- Jones, Denna, ed. (2014). Architecture The Whole Story. Thames & Hudson. ISBN 978-0-500-29148-1.
