= Pro Patrimonio =

Pro Patrimonio logo

Pro Patrimonio is the national trust of Romania. It was established in 2000 with the aim of "the conservation, rescue and reactivation of cultural heritage, especially in architecture" of Romania. It has overseas branches in France, the United States, and the United Kingdom. It has a project to repair and conserve 60 wooden churches which started in 2009 with the support of the Order of Romanian Architects and Europa Nostra. The executive director of the organisation is the architect Șerban Sturdza, who developed the 60 churches project.
