= Dimitrie Sturdza House =

- Casa Dimitrie Sturdza
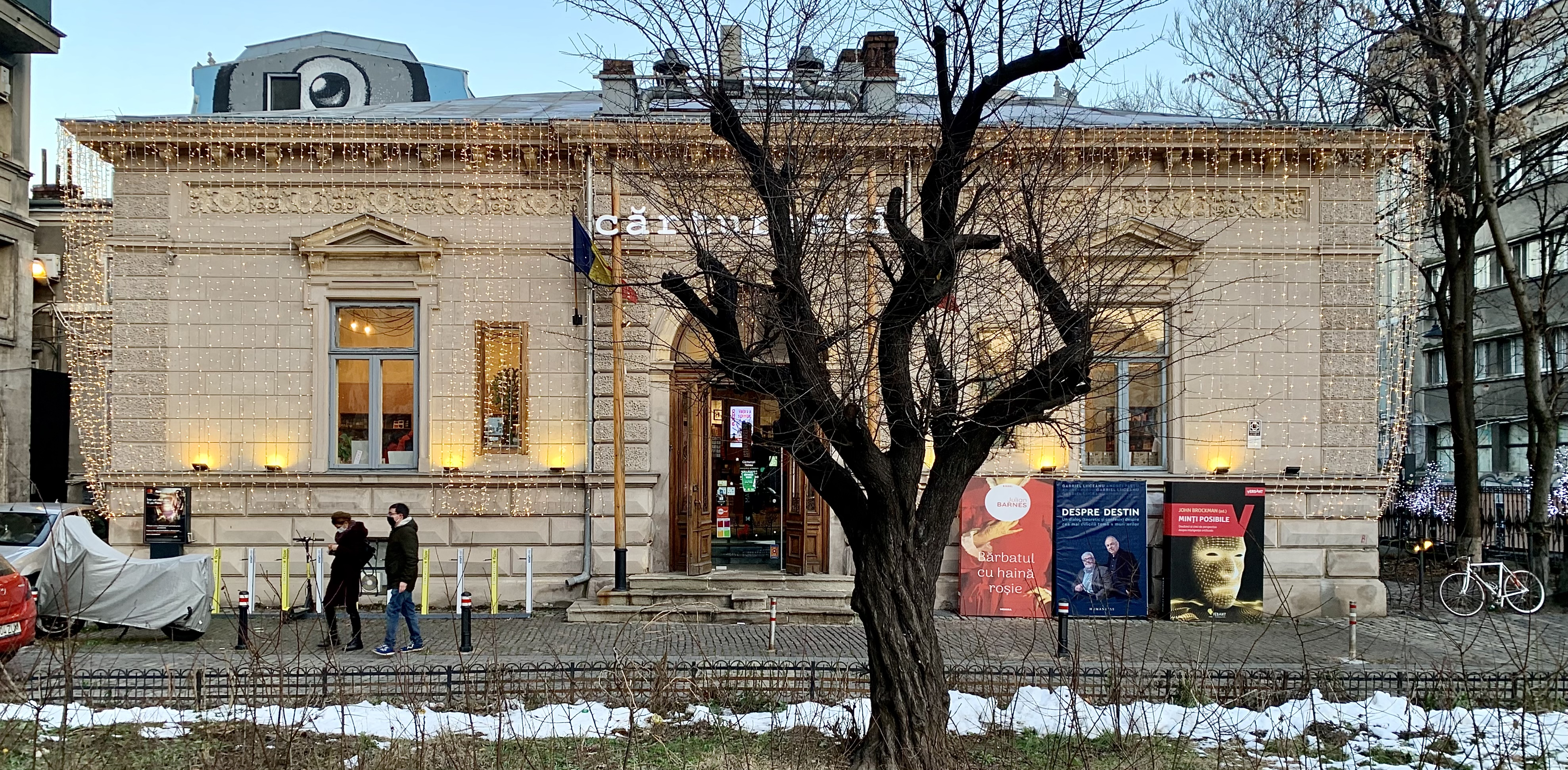
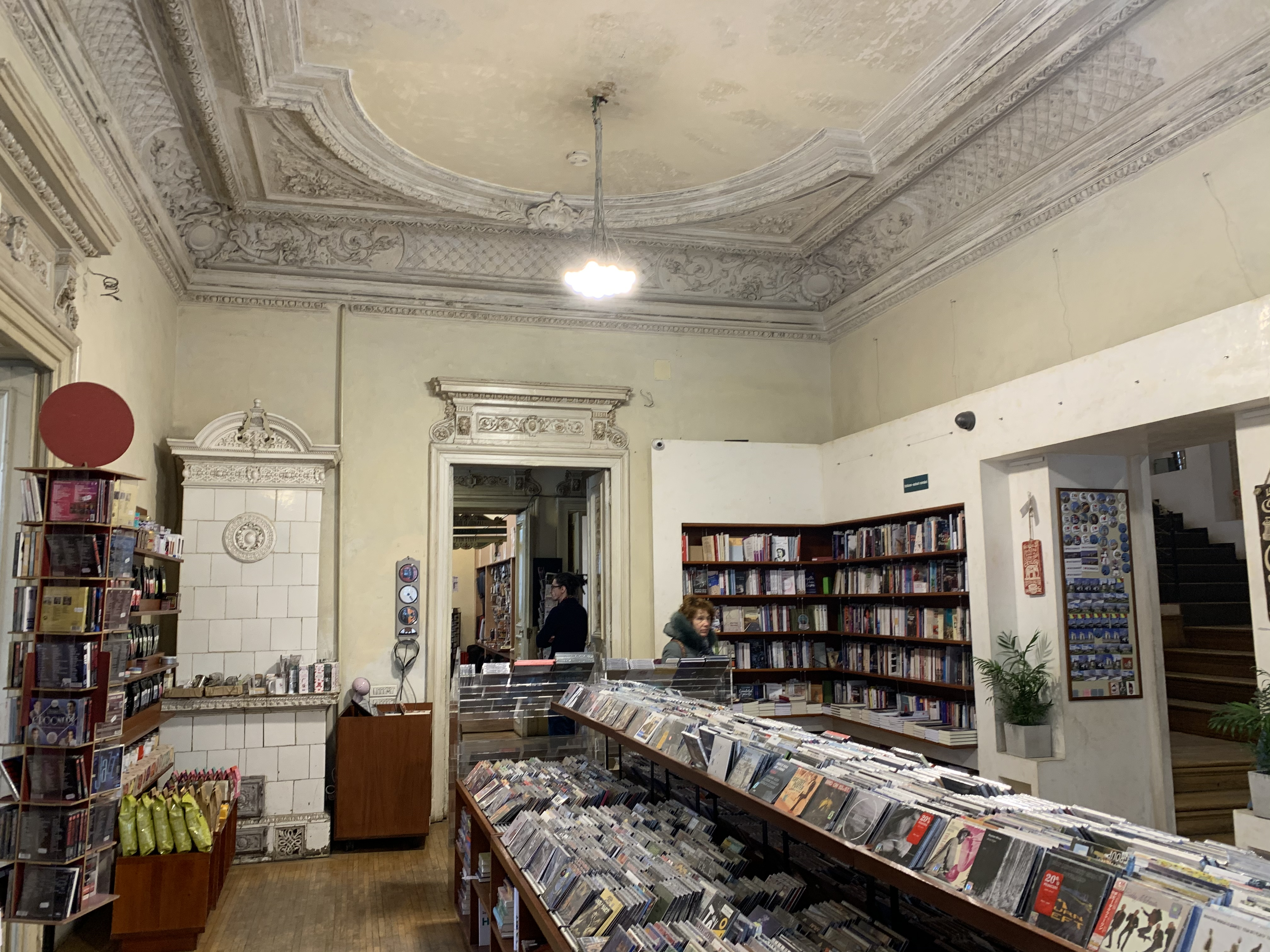
- The entrance of the house; a room of it
- Interactive map of Dimitrie Sturdza House
- Location: Bucharest, Romania
- Coordinates: 44°26′35″N 26°05′58″E
- Completion date: 1883
- Restored date: 2003, by Șerban Sturdza

The Dimitrie Sturdza House (Romanian: Casa Dimitrie Sturdza, Romanian pronunciation: [diˈmitri.e ˈsturza]) is a house with historical value, located in Bucharest, Romania, on Arthur Verona Street, no. 13-15. The house belonged to Dimitrie Sturdza (1833-1914), historian, economist, Romanian Academy member and the prime minister of Romania. Since 2003, it houses the bookshop Cărturești Verona, awarded as the Bookshop of the Year at London Book Fair International Excellence Awards 2021.

== Description ==
Built to a plan typical of mid-19th century wealthy residences, with a central hall and rooms laid out symmetrically. Its ceilings and door frames still preserve the original decorations. The facades are Neoclassical, while the interiors of the house are Eclectic. Some of the ornaments are Renaissance Revival. Many doors of the house are double and painted with grotesques. In the right half of the house are two white stoves.

The house is listed as a historic monument by Romania's Ministry of Culture and Religious Affairs.

== See also ==
- Romanian architecture
