= Șerban Sturdza =

Romanian architect

Șerban Sturdza (born 14 September 1947) is a Romanian architect, former president of the Order of Architects in Romania, current vice president of Pro Patrimonio. and correspondent member of the Romanian Academy (2010).
