= List of Mexican films of 1978 =

A list of the films produced in Mexico in 1978 (see also 1978 in film):

Title	Director	Cast	Genre	Notes
El lugar sin límites	Arturo Ripstein	Roberto Cobo, Gonzalo Vega	Drama	
The Bermuda Triangle	René Cardona Jr.	John Huston, Gloria Guida	Sci-fi	
The Recourse to the Method	Miguel Littín	Katy Jurado		Entered into the 1978 Cannes Film Festival
Noches de cabaret	Rafael Portillo	Sasha Montenegro, Irma Serrano, Lyn May		
El patrullero 777	Miguel M. Delgado	Cantinflas, Ana Bertha Lepe, Valeria Pani, Wolf Ruvinskis		
La Güera Rodríguez	Felipe Cazals	Fanny Cano, Fernando Allende		
El Jardín de los Cerezos	Gonzalo M. Ortega	María Elena Marqués, Julián Soler		
Ratero	Ismael Rodríguez	Roberto "Flaco" Guzmán, Carmen Salinas, Alma Delfina, David Reynoso		
The Children of Sanchez	Hall Bartlett	Anthony Quinn, Dolores del Río, Katy Jurado		
Divinas Palabras	Juan Ibáñez	Silvia Pinal, Mario Almada		
Los hombres no deben llorar	Roberto Ratti	Yolanda del Río, King Clave, Noemí Ceratto, Jorge Vargas, Pedro Weber "Chatanuga"		
Picardia mexícana	Abel Salazar	Vicente Fernández, Jacqueline Andere, Adalberto Martínez "Resortes", Héctor Suárez, Pedro Weber "Chatanuga"		
La comadrita	Fernando Cortés	La India María, Sara García, Fernando Soler, Rafael Inclán, Pedro Infante Jr.		
El circo de Capulina	Gilberto Martínez Solares	Capulina, Rosa Gloria Chagoyán, Alicia Encinas		
El Arracadas	Alberto Mariscal	Vicente Fernández, Mario Almada, Fernando Almada, Roberto Cañedo, Patricia Rivera		
La Muerte Del Soplon	Rubén Galindo	Los Tigres Del Norte, Pedro Infante Jr.		
Roots of Blood	Jesús Salvador Treviño	Richard Yñiguez, Malena Doria, Adriana Rojo, Ernesto Gómez Cruz, Pepe Serna, Roxana Bonila-Giannini	Labor relations	Ariel nominee x2
Bermuda: Cave of the Sharks	Tonino Ricci	Andrés García, Janet Ågren		Co-production with Italy and Spain
Black Angel	Tulio Demicheli	Sandra Mozarowsky, Jorge Rivero, Mónica Randall		Co-production with Spain
Cyclone	René Cardona Jr.	Arthur Kennedy, Carroll Baker, Lionel Stander		
El año de la peste	Felipe Cazals	Alejandro Parodi, José Carlos Ruiz, Rebeca Silva, Tito Junco		
La casa del pelícano	Sergio Véjar	Jacqueline Andere, Daniela Romo, Enrique Álvarez Félix		
Red Gold	Alberto Vázquez-Figueroa	José Sacristán, Isela Vega, Hugo Stiglitz		
The Bees	Alfredo Zacarías	John Saxon, John Carradine, Angel Tompkins, Claudio Brook, Alicia Encinas		
