= Manuel "Flaco" Ibáñez =

Mexican actor

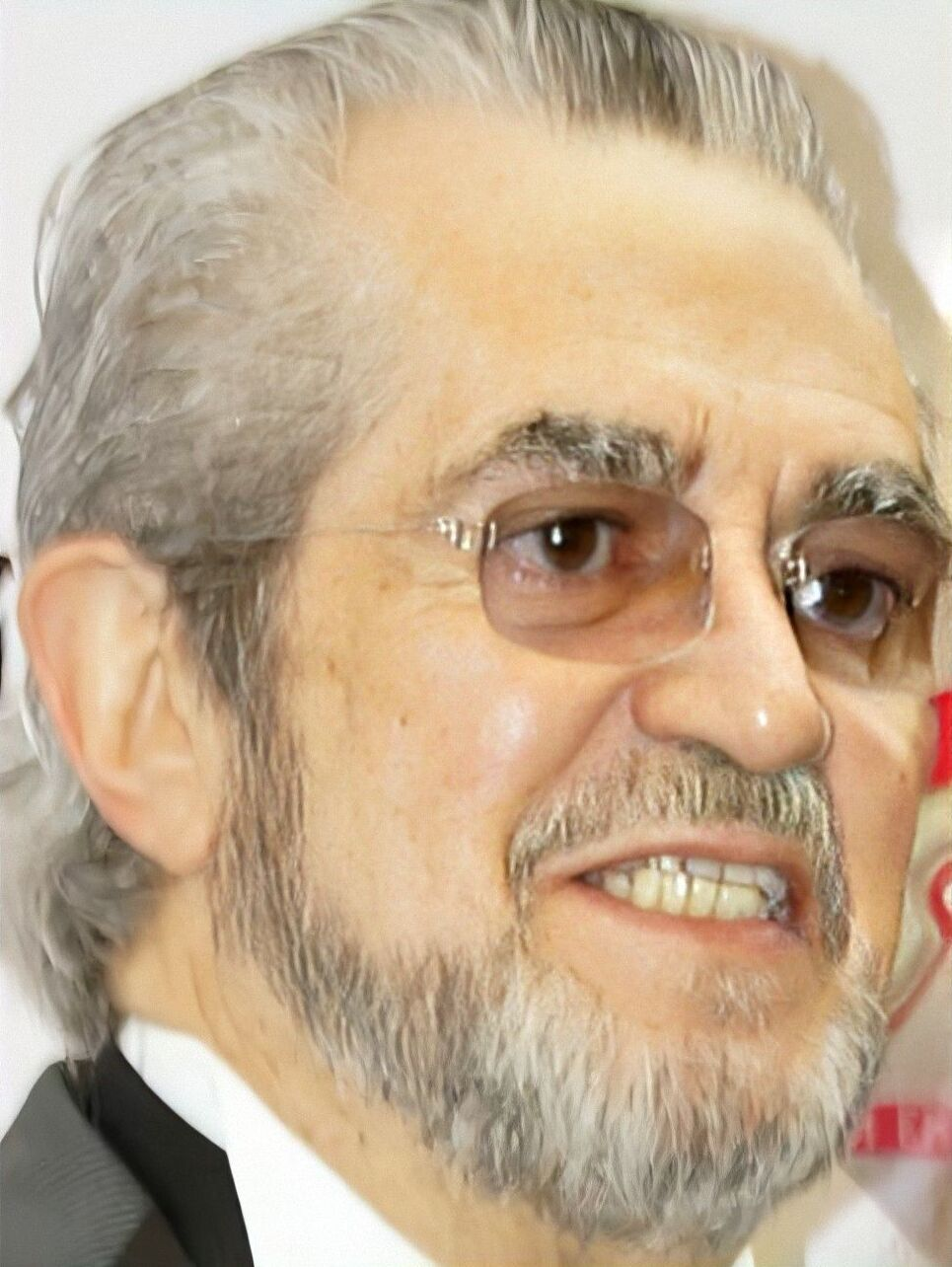
- Manuel Ibáñez in 2018
- Born: Manuel Ibáñez Martínez; 17 October 1946 (age 79); Acatlán de Pérez Figueroa, Oaxaca, Mexico
- Education: Universidad Nacional Autónoma de Mexico
- Occupation: Actor
- Years active: 1970–present
- Spouse: Jacqueline Castro (m. 1979)
- Children: 3

Manuel "Flaco" Ibáñez Martínez (born 17 October 1946) is a Mexican actor and comedian who has appeared in over 140 films and television shows in Mexico.

== Biography ==
Manuel Ibáñez Martínez was born on 17 October 1946, the youngest of four children and the only male child in his family. His father was a day laborer who separated from the family shortly after his son was born. Because his mother had no career of her own, Ibáñez had to assist his family economically from a young age. His mother's brother, Domingo, assisted the family and provided Ibáñez with a much needed father figure during childhood.

After the death of his mother in 1968, Ibáñez started working as a photojournalist in a news agency that had been created by some of his friends. He was sent to cover the student movement of that year, but soon realized that he wanted to be a performer instead.

He enrolled under the Faculty of Philosophy and Literature at the National Autonomous University of Mexico (UNAM), and after competing in an oral poetry competition won a scholarship to study acting at the National Institute of Fine Arts and Literature in Mexico City.

Ibáñez has become one of the icons of Mexican comedy, thanks to his roles in such films as Llegamos, los fregamos y nos fuimos, Los peseros, Los plomeros y las ficheras, El rey de las ficheras, La chica del alacrán de oro, and Lagunilla mi barrio. He has worked with many well known actors, such as Carmen Salinas, Luis de Alba, Alfonso Zayas, Andrés García, Isela Vega, Rafael Inclán, Mario Almada, Sasha Montenegro and Agustín Bernal.

Women have been a major factor in his life, as evidenced by his five marriages. The first, when he was 24 years of age, gave him his first child, Miranda, but quickly ended in divorce. His current wife is Jacqueline Castro, with whom he has had two daughters, Tanya and Daniel. He is also the father of actress Daniela Ibañez.

Ibáñez teaches acting as part of the Centro de Capacitación Artística (CEA) ("Artistic Training Center") of the media company Televisa. He made his television writing debut on the 2005 sitcom Vecinos ("Neighbours"), produced by Eugenio Derbez, in which he also appeared in a recurring acting role. In 2006, Ibáñez moved to Argentina for a major role in the telenovela-sitcom Amor mío ("My Love"), starring Raúl Araiza and Vanessa Guzmán, eventually appearing in 112 episodes over two seasons.

For his work in movies and television Ibanez was inducted into the Paseo de las Luminarias in 1995.

== Filmography ==
=== Television ===
Year(s)	Title	Role
1985	Vivir un poco	Leonardo Rafael Fernández
1993	Valentina	Rigoberto "Rigo" Pérez
1995	Acapulco, cuerpo y alma	Teo
1996	La culpa	Raúl Nava
1998	Ángela	Ramiro
1999	Tres mujeres	Héctor Gómez
1999	¿Qué nos pasa?	
2000–2001	Carita de ángel	Cándido
2001	Navidad sin fin	Darro
2001	Primer amor... tres años después	Conrado Baldomero
2001	Primer amor... a mil por hora	Conrado Baldomero
2001–2002	El juego de la vida	Augusto Vidal
2002–2003	Mujer, casos de la vida real	
2003	Clap!... El lugar de tus sueños	Padre Constantino
2003	Amor real	Remigio Quintero
2004	Hospital el paisa	Eulalio Martínez
2004	Rubí	Onésimo Segundo
2004	Rubí... La descarada	Onésimo Segundo
2005–present	Vecinos	Jorjais
2006–2007	Amor mío	Andrés Sinclair
2008	Las tontas no van al cielo	Don Manuel "Meño" Morales
2009	Camaleones	Leónidas
2009	Un gancho al corazón	Meño
2009–2010	Hasta que el dinero nos separe	Casimiro Gutiérrez "El Gutierritos"
2010	Zacatillo, un lugar en tu corazón	Profundo Isimo
2010–2011	Triunfo del amor	Don Napoleón Bravo
2012	Cloroformo	Don Roque
2012	La mujer del Vendaval	Timoteo Presidente Montenegro Mondràgon
2013-2014	Qué pobres tan ricos	Jesús Mechaca "El Hijo de Sumatra"
2014-2015	La sombra del pasado	Melesio
2015-2016	Antes muerta que Lichita	Ignacio Gutierrez
2021	Vencer el pasado	Camilo Sánchez
2024	Más vale sola	Amador
2024	Y llegaron de noche	Eduardo Arozamena

=== Film and video ===
Year	Title	Role
1970	Quizá siempre si me muera	
1973	La derrota	
1975	La presidenta municipal	Licenciado Cástulo Barrenillo
1976	Actas de Marusia	Rufino
1976	México, México, ra ra ra	
1978	Pasajeros en transito	
1979	El alburero	
1980	La grilla	
1980	Buscando un campeon	
1981	D.F./Distrito Federal	
1981	The Pulque Tavern	
1981	Lagunilla, mi barrio	Piston
1981	El mil usos	
1982	Cosa fácil	Gallo
1982	Días de combate	Gallo Villarreal
1982	Una gallina muy ponedora	
1982	La pulquería 2	
1983	Lagunilla 2	
1984	Siempre en domingo	
1984	Emanuelo	
1984	Nosotros los pelados	
1984	Las glorias del gran Púas	
1984	Se sufre pero se goza	
1984	Adiós Lagunilla, adiós	
1985	De todas... todas!	
1985	Llegamos los fregamos y nos fuimos	
1985	La pulquería ataca de nuevo	
1985	El rey de la vecindad	Caguama
1985	La tumba del mojado	Candido Laponte
1985	Ah que viejas canciones tan calientes	
1986	Toda la vida	Lalo
1986	Perseguido por la ley	
1986	Un macho en la cárcel de mujeres	
1987	Las movidas del mofles	
1987	La mujer policía	
1987	La ruletera	
1987	Es Talon y cobra	
1987	Destrampados in Los Angeles	
1987	Un macho en el salón de belleza	
1988	Día de muertos	
1988	El gran relajo mexicano	
1988	Los maistros	
1988	Los hermanos machorro	
1988	La quinta del amor	
1988	La ley del coyote	
1988	El violador infernal	
1988	Agapito se mete en todo	
1988	La nalgada de oro	
1988	Para que dure no se apure	
1989	Las guerreras del amor	
1989	Las novias del lechero	
1989	El garañón	
1989	Solo para adúlteros	
1989	Los rateros	
1989	El nacimiento de un guerrillero	
1989	Un macho en el reformatorio de señoritas	
1989	El rey de las ficheras	
1989	La portera ardiente	
1989	Las borrachas	
1989	La Bamba sangrienta	
1989	Pilas calientes	
1989	Picardia nacional	
1989	La chamarra de la muerte	
1989	En un motel nadie duerme	
1989	Dos camioneros con suerte (recongidos en cancus)	
1989	El chorizo del carnicero	
1990	Dando y dando	
1990	Dos judiciales en aprietos	
1990	Los aboneros del amor	
1990	Tacos, tortas y enchiladas - La Rifa	
1990	Noche de recamareras (video)	
1990	Muertes violentas	
1990	Brutalidad judicial	
1990	Duelo de rufianes	
1990	Tarot sangriento	
1990	El lechero del barrio	
1990	Muerte bajo la piel	
1990	El reportero	
1990	El pozo del diablo	
1990	Inesperada venganza	
1990	Me lleva el tren	El chofer
1990	El dandy y sus mujeres	
1990	Compadres a la Mexicana	Ismael Llanes
1991	Los hojalateros	
1991	No me des las... gracias llorando	
1991	El gran reto - Lola la Trailera 3	
1991	Serpiente	
1991	La pistola del pájaro	
1991	El pájaro tata	
1991	Tequileros del Rio Grande	Silvano García
1991	Narcovictimas	
1991	Las travesuras del diablo	
1991	Operación Tijuana	
1991	El callejón de los cocolasos	
1991	La leyenda del escorpión	
1991	El bizcocho del Panadero	
1992	La fichera mas rapida del oeste	
1992	Movidas chuecas	
1993	Inseminación artificial	
1993	Me muero de la risa	
1994	La cantina	
1994	La Olimpiada del barrio (video)	
1995	El sexo no causa impuestos (video)	
1995	Violencia en la oscuridad	
1995	El burocrata	
1995	Rojo total	
1995	Asesinos por naturaleza	
1995	Tremendo Escopetón	
1996	El talachas y su meneito (video)	
1996	La chiva loca (video)	
1996	Balazos en la capirucha (video)	
1997	Las mulas del pueblo	
1998	Mi Yegua bronca	
2006	Amor xtremo	
2006	Ambiciona	J
2006	Sexo, amor y otras perversiones 2	Joaquín

== Awards and nominations ==
=== Premios TVyNovelas ===
Year	Category	Title	Result
2009	Best First Actor	Las tontas no van al cielo	Won
2014	Best Supporting Actor	La mujer del Vendaval	Won
2015	Best First Actor	Qué pobres tan ricos	Won
2016	Best Supporting Actor	La sombra del pasado	Nominated

=== Kids Choice Awards México ===
Year	Category	Title	Result
2010	Favorite Villain	Camaleones	Nominated
