= Mexican sex comedy =

Genre of sexploitation film

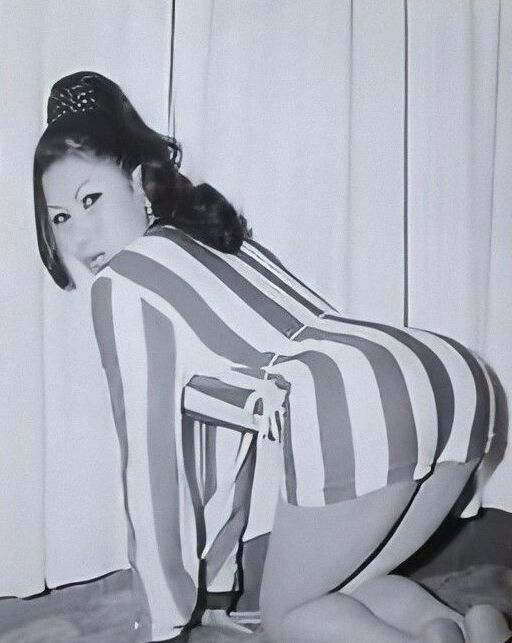
Lyn May, in 1975, an actress associated with this genre of Mexican cinema

Mexican sex comedies, commonly known as ficheras films or sexicomedias, are films in the comedy genre of the Mexican cinema industry. In this subgenre, storylines typically revolve around themes of sexploitation and Mexploitation. Films are mostly recognized as low-quality films with fairly low budgets.

== Description ==
The popular term "ficheras films" came from the 1975 film Bellas de noche, which was also known as Las ficheras. The film told the stories and experiences of many dancing women who entertained men at nightclubs. According to Mexican film critic and screenwriter Tomás Pérez Turrent, the word fichera itself referred to sex workers who mingled with clients at low-tier cabarets. They received fichas, or tokens, from drinks and then exchanged them for money once the cabaret closed. The genre peaked in popularity in the 1970s and 1980s.

The settings and plots of these films tended to be simple, usually dealing with the sexual escapades of working-class Mexicans. The male leads were often construction workers, bricklayers, truck drivers or even unemployed petty scammers, while the female leads were often nightclub dancers, waitresses or prostitutes in small brothels. Other female lead roles included unfaithful wives, women with a busy sex life, or "everyday" women. The films were not generally appropriate for children, and frequently received classification as being unsuitable for minors under the age of 18.

Although the films had sexually suggestive plots and used comedic innuendos and double entendres, they were not overtly explicit, and were never considered to be pornographic. Furthermore, it was not uncommon for the male characters in these films to comedically fail in their attempts to win over, or have sex with, the female characters. When a man was successful in wooing a woman, the performances were deliberately over-exaggerated and pantomime-like, aiming to generate laughter more than arousal. The genre is similar to, and possibly influenced by, Italian erotic comedies.

== Historical and Political Context ==
=== Economic Crisis and Cinema Decline ===
In the 1980s Mexico, along with many other Latin American countries, was undergoing an economic debt crisis due to excessive foreign borrowing. Mexico informed the United States of their inability to pay back their debt of $80 billion. This in turn led to banks abruptly halting overseas financing and set many countries in Latin America on the path for a deep recession. The United States, fearing a large-scale economic crisis, intervened with a debt restructuring program for the affected countries. Though the solution eliminated any immediate threats for Mexico, the root of the issue remained, leading to the reduction in funding for infrastructure, health, and education. Many state employees also saw either a freeze on their wages or layoffs.

Mexico's financial turmoil set forth a flurry of financial setbacks for the motion-picture industry. State-sponsored films significantly decreased in production, making much room for churros–low-budget and low-quality, fast-profit films that were typically centered on plots involving sex, drugs, crime, and violence. Funding from private producers allowed these films to almost entirely saturate Mexican cinema in the late 1970s and throughout the 1980s.

=== Censorship ===
Under the Luis Echeverría administration (1970-1976), filmmakers were assured that they would not be reprimanded or censored if they chose to pursue any social or political theme in their work. The Echeverría administration strongly backed the film industry and worked to revitalize it through state-backed projects. When the José López Portillo administration (1976-1982) came about, all cinematic policies made under the Echeverría administration were seemingly reversed, limiting state funding and establishing a form of cinematic censorship aimed at suppressing opposing political or social opinions.

== Examples ==
Some of the films of this Mexican genre included El rey de las ficheras, La pulquería, Muñecas de medianoche, Bellas de noche, and Entre ficheras anda el diablo.

The best-known Mexican and international actors and actresses who were known to have participated in ficheras films were:

- Sasha Montenegro
- Angelica Chain
- Andrés García
- Mauricio Garcés
- Lina Santos
- Lyn May
- Marcia Bell
- Leticia Perdigón
- Carmen Salinas
- Jorge Rivero
- Alberto Rojas "El caballo"
- Rafael Inclán
- Roberto Ibañez
- Leopoldo García Peláez Benítez Polo Polo
- Antonio Raxel
- Raúl Padilla "El Choforo"
- Miguel M. Delgado
- Luis de Alba
- René Ruíz "Tun Tun"
- Pedro Weber "Chattanooga"
- César Bono
- Eduardo de la Peña "Lalo el Mimo"
- Rossy Mendoza
- Alfonso Zayas

== See also ==
- Commedia sexy all'italiana
- Comedia picaresca
- Mexican LGBTQ cinema
