= Angelica Chain =

Mexican actress (born 1956)

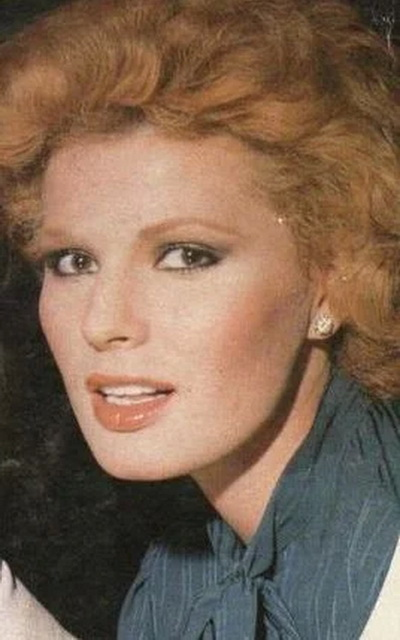
- Angelina Chain in 1975
- Born: Angelica Chahin Martínez; May 12, 1956 (age 70); Orizaba, Veracruz, Mexico
- Occupations: Television and film actress, dancer, model
- Notable credit(s): "Santo and Blue Demon vs. Dr. Frankenstein", "El Sexo me da Risa", "Los Verduleros"

Angelica Chain (born Angelica Chahin Martínez; May 12, 1956) is a Mexican actress, model and vedette, who is best known for her acting in fichera (Mexican sex comedy) films, many of which she participated playing the couple of another famous actor, Alfonso Zayas. She was once considered a sex symbol in Mexico.

== Early life ==
Chain was born in Orizaba, Veracruz, Mexico in 1956, the daughter of a man of Arab descent, and of a Mexican woman. Her father's family was from Lebanon. Chain became involved in the entertainment industry as a teenager.

== Acting career ==
By the early 1970s Chain was involved in some romantic and erotic fotonovelas which helped her get discovered by Mexican film producers.

In 1973, at the age of 17, Chain was hired to participate in her first film, which was named Santo and Blue Demon vs. Dr. Frankestein, where she acted alongside wrestlers and actors Santo and Blue Demon. She was hired for that movie, in which she also shared credits with Ruben Aguirre (who was to become better known later as Profesor Girafales from the El Chavo del Ocho television shows) and with Sasha Montenegro, by the director Miguel M. Delgado.

She had a prolific acting career from that moment on. From there on and until the early 1990s she participated in some 50 Mexican sex comedies, and also had more serious roles in some telenovelas. Among many other films where she acted, some of the best remembered are El sexo me da risa (Sex Makes me Laugh), Las siete cucas (The Seven Pussies, but Cuca is also used as a female name in many Hispanic countries), La pulquería (The Tavern), Muñecas de medianoche (Midnight Lady Dolls), Ratas de la ciudad (City Rats), Los verduleros (The Greengrocers) and Ratero de la vecindad (Neighborhood Thief).

She retired from her acting career early in the 1990s after her husband, a well-known millionaire, allegedly forced her to retire, fearful that his image could be affected if she kept acting in sex comedies.

Chain made a brief return to her acting career in 2020.

== Personal life ==
Chain is married to millionaire Enrique Molina Sobrino, who is a Mexican soda and hotel mogul and banker. They live in the United States.

She and her husband founded the "Fundacion Angie" (named after her), whose declared purpose was to eradicate poverty in Mexico by helping people regardless of nationality, genre, religion or age.

== See also ==
- List of Mexicans
