= Sexo vs. sexo =

- Directed by: Víctor Manuel Castro
- Written by: Víctor Manuel Castro, Jorge M. Isaac
- Produced by: Jorge M. Isaac
- Starring: Sara García, Amparo Muñoz, Rafael Inclán
- Cinematography: Fernando Colín
- Edited by: Maximino Sánchez Molina
- Music by: Carlos Torres
- Distributed by: Producciones Virgo's
- Release date: 1980
- Running time: 95 minutes
- Country: Mexico
- Language: Spanish

Sexo vs. sexo ("Sex vs. Sex"), also known as Sexo contra Sexo, is a 1980 Mexican film. It stars Sara García in her final film appearance at the age of 85. It was directed by Víctor Manuel Castro and was released on 24 February 1983. The screenplay was written by Jorge M. Isaac and Víctor Manuel Castro.

Garcia's role was described by Ileana Baeza Lope in a biography of Garcia as an upturning of the normal view of disability and the asexuality of old age by combining her manipulative old woman role with the beautiful woman that constantly pushes her around in a wheelchair.

== Cast ==
- Sara García as Doña Consuelito
- Amparo Muñoz as Marina
- Rafael Inclán
- Susana Cabrera as Marina's aunt
- Grace Renat as Estrella
- Andrés García as José Luis
- Luis Manuel Pelayo as Don Saturnino González
- Polo Ortín as Polo
- Carlos Monden as Anibal Radel
- Rodolfo Rodríguez as Benito
- Pedro Weber 'Chatanuga' as Ponciano
