= The Kidnapping of Lola =

- Directed by: Raúl Fernández
- Written by: Carlos Valdemar; Rolando Fernández
- Starring: Rosa Gloria Chagoyán; Rolando Fernández; Frank Moro
- Cinematography: Laura Ferlo
- Edited by: Jorge Rivera
- Production company: Scope Films
- Release date: 25 December 1986
- Running time: 112 minutes
- Country: Mexico
- Language: Spanish

The Kidnapping of Lola (Spanish: El secuestro de Lola) is a 1986 Mexican action film directed by Raúl Fernández and starring Rosa Gloria Chagoyán, Rolando Fernández and Frank Moro. It is a sequel to the 1983 hit Lola the Truck Driver, and is sometimes known as Lola the Truck Driver 2. Another sequel Lola the Truck Driver 3 followed in 1991.

== Cast ==
- Rosa Gloria Chagoyán as Lola Chagano
- Rolando Fernández as Jorge Stander
- Frank Moro as El Maestro
- Isela Vega
- Emilio 'El indio' Fernández as Commander Prieto
- Xavier Rizzo as Former Police Officer
- Joaquín García Vargas as Lola's Godfather
- Fannie Kauffman 'Vitola' as Ana Paula
- María Cardinal
- Edna Bolkan
- Sergio Ramos
- Isaura Espinoza
- Wolf Ruvinskis
- Juan Gallardo
- Ricardo Carrión as Former Brawler
- Alfredo Wally Barrón
- Paco Sañudo as Gay at Ana Paula's
- Luis Manuel Pelayo
- Ernesto Burgueño
- Carlos Rotzinger
- Lucía Gálvez
- Toño Camacho
- Jasmin Lira
- Marcia Bell
- Rene Vela
- Minu Caronni
- Jose Antonio Woorlich
- Sergio Sánchez
- Maria Eugenia Plascencia S.
- Carlos Teran
- Fernando Moncada
- Sonia Camacho
- Miguel Ángel Fuentes
- Juan Barahona
- Licia Suarez
- Javier Arteaga
- José Antonio Marros
- Josefina de Manzano

== Bibliography ==
- David Maciel. El Norte: The U.S.-Mexican Border in Contemporary Cinema. SCERP and IRSC publications, 1990.
