= Golden Legs =

- Directed by: Alejandro Galindo
- Written by: Antonio Tanus; Víctor Manuel Castro; Fidel Ángel Espino; Alejandro Galindo
- Produced by: Gregorio Walerstein
- Starring: Antonio Espino "Clavillazo"; Teresa Velázquez
- Cinematography: Rosalío Solano
- Edited by: Rafael Ceballos
- Music by: Manuel Esperón
- Production company: Cinematográfica Filmex
- Release date: 16 April 1958
- Running time: 92 minutes
- Country: Mexico
- Language: Spanish

Golden Legs (Spanish:Piernas de oro) is a 1958 Mexican sports comedy film written and directed by Alejandro Galindo and starring Antonio Espino «Clavillazo» and Teresa Velázquez. This film features of which there is a special participation of actress and singer, María de Lourdes. It is set in the world of competitive cycling.

== Cast ==
- Antonio Espino as Clavillazo Tachuela Piernas de oro
- Tere Velázquez as Teresa
- Marco de Carlo as Esteban
- Óscar Pulido as Domingo Murrieta, presidente municipal
- Luis Aragón as Don Melchor
- Fidel Ángel Espino as Entrenador
- Antonio Tanus
- Víctor Manuel Castro
- Alfonso Zayas
- Julián Garcia
- José Muñoz as Señor Cantino
- Eduardo Charpenel
- Bruno Marquez
- Manuel Vargas M.
- Oswaldo Fernandez
- Polo Ortín
- Arturo Cobo
- Salvador Saldívar
- Francisco Quiles
- José Loza
- José Wilhelmy
- Armando Acosta as Hombre en restaurante
- Daniel Arroyo as Espectador
- María de Lourdes as Cantante
- Enedina Díaz de León as Cocinera
- Vicente Lara as Hombre en restaurante
- Cecilia Leger as Pueblerina
- Pedro Mago Septien as Narrador
- Paula Rendón
- Carlos Robles Gil as Hombre en restaurante

== Bibliography ==
- Joanne Hershfield, David R. Maciel. Mexico's Cinema: A Century of Film and Filmmakers. Rowman & Littlefield, 1999.
