= Sobrino =

Sobrino is a Spanish surname. Notable people with the surname include:

== People ==
- Enrique Molina Sobrino, founder of Gemex, a Pepsi bottling company in Mexico
- María Reyes Sobrino (born 1967), Spanish racewalking athlete
- Francisco Sobrino (1932–2014), Spanish sculptor who lived in Paris
- Joaquín Sobrino (born 1982), Spanish cyclist
- Jon Sobrino (born 1938), Jesuit Catholic priest and liberation theologian
- Juan Sobrino, civil engineer specializing in bridge construction
- Rubén Sobrino (born 1992), Spanish professional footballer

== Other ==
- Sobrino de Botín, a restaurant in Madrid operating since 1725
