= Las cariñosas =

Las cariñosas may refer to:

- The Loving Ones, a 1979 Mexican comedy film
- The Loving Women, a 1953 Mexican comedy film
