= Lola the Truck Driver 3 =

- Directed by: Raúl Fernández hijo
- Written by: Carlos Valdemar; Rolando Fernández; Raúl Fernández hijo
- Produced by: Guillermo Cisneros; Fernando de Fuentes hijo Raúl Fernández hijo Rolando Fernández; Leobardo Olivares; Óscar Sánchez; Gerardo Velazco
- Starring: Rosa Gloria Chagoyán; Rolando Fernández; Frank Moro
- Cinematography: Armando Castillón
- Edited by: Jorge Rivera
- Music by: Enrique Londaits; Richard Mochulsky
- Production companies: Televicine; Cinematografica Fernandez
- Distributed by: Televicine
- Release date: 17 January 1991
- Running time: 90 minutes
- Country: Mexico
- Language: Spanish

Lola the Truck Driver 3 (Spanish:El gran reto - Lola la Trailera 3) is a 1991 Mexican action film directed by Raúl Fernández hijo and starring Rosa Gloria Chagoyán, Rolando Fernández and Frank Moro. It is the third and last in a trilogy of films begun by Lola the Truck Driver in 1983.

== Cast ==
- Rosa Gloria Chagoyán as Lola Chagano
- Rolando Fernández as Jorge Stander
- Frank Moro as El Maestro
- Manuel 'Flaco' Ibáñez
- Guillermo Rivas as Mechanician
- Susana Cabrera
- Alfredo Solares
- Charly Valentino
- Enrique Cuenca
- Joaquin Garcia Vargas as Lola's Godfather
- Guillermo de Alvarado
- Luis Aguilar
- María Cardinal
- Ricardo Carrión
- Viviana Rey as Korna
- Julio Fernandez
- David Fuentes
- Daniel Benítez as himself - Reporter
- Paco Sañudo as Gay at Ana Paula's
- Rene Vela
- Daniela Mori
- Armando Castillon
- Lucía Gálvez
- Adolfo Magaldi
- Verónica Torriz
- Rubén Fernández
- Sonia Velazquez
- Memo Ruiz
- Luis A. Rodriguez
- José Antonio Garzón
- Jesús Iñiguez
- Eduardo Garante
- Toño Soriano
- Juan Almazan
- Manuel Garza
- José Manuel Fernández
- Gilberto Hamilton
- Jones Carrabazal
- Fernando Ortiz
- Antonio Ortiz
- Alejandro Herédia
- Eduardo Sánchez Torell
- Hugo González Guzmán
- Miguel Ángel Sánchez
- Richard Mossulske

== Bibliography ==
- Victoria Ruétalo, Dolores Tierney. Latsploitation, Exploitation Cinemas, and Latin America. Routledge, 2009.
