= Princesa Lea =

- Born: Susan Linda Fair; 1949 (age 76–77); Montreal, Quebec, Canada
- Occupations: Vedette, actress, dancer
- Years active: 1973-1991

Susan Linda Fair, better known as Princesa Lea (born 1949 in Montreal, Quebec) is a Canadian-born Mexican vedette, actress, and dancer, of Canadian origin. She was one of the most popular Mexican vedettes during the 1970s and 1980s.

== Career ==
She first stepped on Mexican soil on July 28, 1973, arriving from Miami. She debuted at the Blanquita Theater in Mexico City. Her godfather was the singer Vicente Fernández.

She shared credits with the group Marraquesh and the comedian Raúl Vale. Later she was recognized as the "Majesty of the Vedettes". Princesa Lea made fashion plumes and artistic plumage, in addition to her acrobatic dance. She became famous for her show, in which she bathed naked in a glass of champagne. She also appeared in venues in New York, Chicago and Los Angeles, in the United States.

She is currently based in Tuxtla Gutiérrez, Chiapas, Mexico.

== Filmography ==
=== Films ===
- Las del talón (1978)
- Midnight Dolls (1979)
- Burlesque (1980)
- Intrépidos punks (1980)
- Las piernas del millón (1981)
- El macho biónico (1981)
- Las fabulosas del reventón (1982)
- La isla de Rarotonga (1982)
- Cosa fácil (1982)
- Spicy Chile (1983)
- La casa que arde de noche (1985)
- Dos pistoleros famosos (1985)
- Mientras México duerme (1986)
- Itara, el guardián de la muerte (1988)
- Pasaporte a la muerte (1988)
- Los plomeros y las ficheras (1988)
- Taquito de ojo (1988)
- Las aventuras de Juán Camaney (1988)
- El violador infernal (1988)
- El vergonzoso (1988)
- Central camionera (1988)
- Un macho en el reformatorio de señoritas (1989)
- Un asesino anda suelto (1991)
- El muerto (1991)

=== Television ===
- Variedades de medianoche (1977)
