= Fichera =

Fichera is a surname. Notable people with the surname include:

- Gaetano Fichera (1922–1996), Italian mathematician
  - Fichera's existence principle
- Joseph Fichera, American business executive
- Marco Fichera (born 1993), Italian fencer
