= El secuestro de un policía =

El secuestro de un policia
- Directed by: Alfredo B. Crevenna
- Written by: José Loza
- Produced by: José David
- Starring: Jorge Abraham; Adalberto Arvizu; José Luis Avendaño
- Cinematography: Antonio Ruiz
- Edited by: Federico Landeros
- Music by: Marco Flores
- Release date: 1991
- Running time: 90 minutes
- Country: Mexico
- Language: Spanish

El secuestro de un policía ("Kidnapping of a policeman") is a 1991 Mexican film. It stars Jorge Abraham and Adalberto Arvizu, directed by José Luis Avendaño. It is also known as Ráfagas de metralleta (Machine gun blast).

== Cast ==
- Jorge Abraham
- Adalberto Arvizu
- José Luis Avendaño
- Agustín Bernal
- Manuel Capetillo hijo
- Fernando Casanova
- María de Montecarlo
- Rojo Grau
- Miguel Gómez Checa
- Guillermo Inclán
- Estela Inda
- Queta Lavat
- Sasha Montenegro
- Elsa Montes
- Elsa Nava
- Jorge Gonzalez Oliva
- Arlette Pacheco
- Antonio Raxel
- Gabriela Rodriguez
- Gilberto Román
- Jorge Santos
- Rebeca Silva
- Armando Silvestre
- Martha Stringel
- Jorge Vargas
- Leo Villanueva

== Release ==
The film is a kind of reboot of El secuestro de Camarena, a 1985 film also by Crevenna.
