= El pecado de Adán y Eva =

- Directed by: Miguel Zacarías
- Starring: Jorge Rivero
- Production company: Azteca Films
- Distributed by: Dimension Pictures (US)
- Release date: 1969
- Running time: 77 mins
- Country: Mexico
- Language: Spanish

El pecado de Adán y Eva ('The Sin of Adam and Eve') is a Mexican biblical epic film from 1969.

== Production background ==
The film, directed by Miguel Zacarías, retells the biblical story of Adam and Eve. Mexican actor Jorge Rivero played Adam, while newcomer Candice 'Candy' Wilson played Eve. There are no other actors in the film. The movie is largely silent, with the actors gesturing and calling each other's names to communicate. The film has some opening narration, as well as the voice of God saying a few phrases from the heavens.

The film gained notoriety because Rivero and Wilson appear fully nude throughout most of the film, with occasional glimpses of genitalia, pubic hair and female nipples.

The film was picked up by Dimension Pictures. Stephanie Rothman and her husband Charles Swartz supervised re editing and dubbing the film for US release.
