= Music and Money =

1958 film

- Directed by: Rafael Portillo
- Written by: Carlos Sampelayo
- Produced by: Pedro A. Calderón
- Starring: Tito Guízar; Luis Aguilar; Pedro Vargas
- Cinematography: Enrique Wallace
- Edited by: Pedro Velázquez
- Music by: Antonio Díaz Conde
- Production company: Cinematográfica Calderón
- Release date: 22 May 1958
- Country: Mexico
- Language: Spanish

Music and Money (Spanish: Música y dinero) is a 1958 Mexican musical comedy film directed by Rafael Portillo and starring Tito Guízar, Luis Aguilar and Pedro Vargas. The film's sets were designed by the art director Manuel Fontanals.

== Cast ==
- Luis Aguilar
- Alejandro Algara
- Tony Carbajal
- Abel Cureño
- Mario Gil
- Tito Guízar
- Rebeca Iturbide
- Irving Lee
- Gloria Mestre
- Jorge Mondragón
- Eduardo Noriega
- Rosina Pagã
- Dámaso Pérez Prado
- Manuel Trejo Morales
- Jorge Treviño
- Pedro Vargas

== Bibliography ==
- Rogelio Agrasánchez. Cine Mexicano: Posters from the Golden Age, 1936-1956. Chronicle Books, 2001.
