= Midnight Dolls =

1979 film

- Directed by: Rafael Portillo
- Written by: Víctor Manuel Castro; Francisco Cavazos
- Produced by: Guillermo Calderon
- Starring: Jorge Rivero; Isela Vega; Sasha Montenegro
- Cinematography: Miguel Araña
- Music by: Gustavo César Carrión
- Production company: Cinematográfica Calderón
- Release date: 27 December 1979
- Running time: 115 minutes
- Country: Mexico
- Language: Spanish

Midnight Dolls (Spanish: Muñecas de medianoche) is a 1979 Mexican erotic drama film directed by Rafael Portillo and starring Jorge Rivero, Isela Vega, and Sasha Montenegro. The film belongs to a genre that has been described as "cabaratera film", popular in the 1950s and then again in the 1970s: "These movies were instant successes due to their half-nudity, implied eroticism, musical backgrounds, sensual dancing, and foul language", commented Andrew Grant Wood.

== Cast ==
- Jorge Rivero as Rafael Martinez Lopez
- Isela Vega as
- Sasha Montenegro
- Carmen Salinas
- Rafael Inclán
- Víctor Manuel Castro
- Pompín Iglesias
- Princesa Lea
- Roberto G. Rivera
- Irina Areu
- Diana Arriaga
- Angélica Chain
- Enrique Cuenca
- Humberto Elizondo
- Armando Silvestre
- Manuel 'Loco' Valdés

== Bibliography ==
- Charles Ramírez Berg. Cinema of Solitude: A Critical Study of Mexican Film, 1967-1983. University of Texas Press, 2010.
