= Conquest (1983 film) =

1983 film directed by Lucio Fulci

- Italian theatrical release poster by Enzo Sciotti
- Directed by: Lucio Fulci
- Screenplay by: Gino Capone; Carlos Vasallo; Jose Antonio de la Loma
- Story by: Giovanni Di Clemente
- Produced by: Giovanni Di Clemente
- Starring: Jorge Rivero; Andrea Occhipinti; Conrado San Martín; Sabrina Siani
- Cinematography: Alejandro Ulloa
- Edited by: Emilio Rodriguez Oses
- Music by: Claudio Simonetti
- Production companies: Clemi Cinematgorafica; Golden Sun; Producciones Esme
- Release dates: June 2, 1983 (Italy); August 19, 1983 (Spain); August 15, 1985 (Mexico)
- Running time: 92 minutes
- Countries: Italy; Spain; Mexico
- Language: Italian

Conquest is a 1983 sword & sorcery fantasy film directed by Lucio Fulci. The film plot involves Ilias (Andrea Occhipinti) a young man who battles monsters and mutants on his journey to manhood. Conquest was reviewed by both AllMovie and The Monthly Film Bulletin, who noted the film's low budget and derivative nature, while finding the film to be surprisingly entertaining despite its negative aspects.

== Plot ==
A youth named Ilias leaves his family in his paradise home for the wilderness. He receives a magic bow from his father to mark his passage into manhood. Ilias enters a land where creatures terrorize small tribes. While in a drugged state, Ocron, the creatures' masked leader, sees a faceless youth with a magic bow who dares to attack her. She sends her creatures out to look for the man.

A gang of Ocron's marauders later tries to steal the bow and capture Ilias. But they are foiled when outlaw Mace appears and beats up the marauders, who flee. Mace teams up with Ilias on his quest to rid the land of evil. Later, while training with the bow, Mace kills a random hunter, and both he and Ilias steal the dying man's game.

Next, Ocron sends Fado, her creatures' leader, to capture Ilias and the bow. Ilias and Mace stop for the night to rest and eat with a tribe in caves and offer them a fresh animal kill as a gift. Ilias recognizes a young girl of the tribe seen earlier in the journey, and the two of them go off together. Masked attackers soon kill the girl and abduct Ilias, stealing his bow. Mace tracks them down to a camp and rescues Ilias in a bloody fight.

At Ocron's lair, Fado gets burned on a giant hot plate as punishment for failing to capture the bow. Ocron summons the Great Zora, a spirit who resides in the body of a white wolf. She offers herself, body and soul, to Zora if he can kill Ilias.

Meanwhile, Mace refuses to continue aiding Ilias, thinking that Ocron is too powerful to combat. Mace agrees to escort Ilias as far as the seashore, from where the latter must sail to Ocron's fortress. The surrounding shrubbery eventually fires hundreds of tiny poisoned arrows at the two of them. One arrow hits Ilias in the arm, soon breaking out in boils. Mace sails with him along the coast to a place where a unique plant grows that will cure his affliction of the poison. Leaving Ilias on the boat, Mace jumps ashore and soon battles zombies and, later, a double of himself. Mace wins the fight, and his double is revealed as Zora, who disappears.

The plant works, and Ilias is restored to health. However, he has become disenchanted and decides to sail home, pleading with Mace to go with him. Mace refuses and also refuses to take ownership of the bow. No sooner have they parted when cobweb-covered monsters attack Mace. They tie Mace to a wooden cross and interrogate him about the whereabouts of Ilias. Mace refuses to cooperate. Ilias saves him with his bow and arrows. But Mace falls off a cliff and into the sea during the rescue. Super-intelligent dolphins bite at the ropes that tie Mace to the cross and he is washed ashore, barely conscious. Ilias arrives and says that he has had a change of heart and decided to return to be with Mace and defeat Ocron.

That night, Ilias is grabbed and sucked down into a lair inhabited by subterranean monsters. Mace follows and is forced to battle them while chasing after Ilias. Venturing further into the caves, Mace finds Ilias, hanging upside down with his head cut off. Zora delivers Ilias's severed head and the bow to Ocron. Mace lights a funeral pyre for Ilias. Ilias' spirit then speaks inside Mace's mind and tells him to anoint himself with the ashes. This will pass along the power Cronos gave to Ilias, and the bow will be Mace's.

The next morning, Mace confronts Ocron in her lair. The bow soon flies out of her hands, and into his. He takes on all of Ocron's werewolves, shooting them with magic arrows. One arrow penetrates Ocron's mask, revealing the face of a ghoul atop her human body. Ocron dies, and her corpse transforms into a wolf, which runs off into the wilderness with the wolf Zora. Mace decides to continue Ilias's quest to rid the land of evil.

== Cast ==
- Andrea Occhipinti as Ilias
- Jorge Rivero as Mace
- Conrado San Martín as Zora
- Sabrina Siani as Ocron
- Gioia Maria Scola
- José Gras Palau as Fado
- Violeta Cela as a sacrificial victim

== Production ==
After the surprise box office hit of Jean-Jacques Annaud's film Quest for Fire (1981) in Italy, several film production followed to mimic the films style. These included films like Umberto Lenzi's Ironmaster (1982) and Lucio Fulci's Conquest. Fulci was offered to film Conquest from producer Gianni Di Clemente while filming Manhattan Baby for Fabrizio De Angelis in 1982 and signed two do a two-film deal with the producer.

The film's original Italian shooting title was Mace, il fuorilegge (transl. Mace, the Outlaw). The film was an Italian-Spanish-Mexican co-production filmed at R.P.A. Elios Studios in Rome. Fulci did not have a good experience during the development of Conquest and said he left during post-production and did not go forward with making the second film project he had originally signed on to create. The director said he only came in to see what Vincenzo Tomassi to see the final cut of the film.

== Release ==
Conquest was released on June 2, 1983 in Italy, and on August 19, 1983 in Spain under the title La conquista de la tierra perdida. Italian film historian Roberto Curti described the film as a box-office bomb in Italy where it grossed less than 100 million Italian lire.

Conquest was released theatrically in the United States in April 1984 with an 89 minute running time, and in the United Kingdom in May 1984 with a running time of 84 minutes. It was released Mexico on August 15, 1985.

== Reception ==
In a contemporary review, The Monthly Film Bulletin referred to the film as a "low-budget, deliriously magpie mix of Conan the Barbarian, Quest for Fire and Raiders of the Lost Ark with a few zombies—Fulci's Forte—thrown in for good measure." The review stated that despite "excessive gore," "manifestly implausible plot" and "patchy special effects," that the film was "actually very enjoyable." The review also commented on Claudio Simonetti's score, finding it "wonderfully inappropriate" and reminiscent of Simonetti's work in Goblin and on the scores for Deep Red and Dawn of the Dead. Anne Billson of London's Time Out says three "is an inordinate amount of spurting wounds, severed heads and oozing poison pustules which jilfs up the action whenever the dumb dialogue and orange-filtered skies threaten to get tiresome."

Jeremy Wheeler (AllMovie) gave the film two stars out of five, while noting that "even with the shoddy production values and downright embarrassing monster masks, it is what it is—a psychedelic C-Grade fantasy flick by the master of Italian gore done in an incredibly strange time and place in movie history—Italy in the early '80s. Some might call it junk, but those with their tongue planted firmly in cheek will call it a schlock masterpiece."

In his analysis of the film, Louis Paul described the film as "far better than similar Italian sword-and-sorcery contrivances of the time." While criticizing part of the dialogue, he particularly praised the cinematography and the performance of the main actor Jorge Rivero.
