= La hermana dinamita =

- Directed by: Rafael Baledón
- Starring: Hilda Aguirre; Jorge Rivero; Sara García; Fernando Luján; Jorge Lavat; Roberto Cañedo; Ramón Valdés
- Release date: 1970
- Country: Mexico
- Language: Spanish

La hermana dinamita ("The Dynamite Sister" or "Sister Dynamite") or La hermanita dinamita ("Little Sister Dynamite") is a 1970 Mexican film. It stars Jorge Rivero, Sara García and Hilda Aguirre.
