= Con el cuerpo prestado =

- Directed by: Tulio Demicheli
- Screenplay by: Tulio Demicheli
- Story by: Álvaro de la Iglesia
- Starring: Sasha Montenegro; María Sorté
- Cinematography: Miguel Garzón
- Edited by: Sergio Soto
- Release date: 27 January 1983 (Mexico)
- Running time: 95 minutes
- Country: Mexico
- Language: Spanish

Con el cuerpo prestado (English: "With a Borrowed Body") is a 1983 Mexican fantasy comedy film directed by Tulio Demicheli and starring Sasha Montenegro and María Sorté.

== Plot ==
Marta (Montenegro), a woman who tries to commit suicide, is saved by another, Carlota (Sorté), from drowning, but in preventing it Carlota herself dies drowned. After a while, Carlota returns in spirit to take possession of Marta's body and thus meet the man she loved in life.

== Cast ==
- Sasha Montenegro as Marta Jiménez de Arias
- María Sorté as Carlota Beltrán
- Carlos Piñar as Roberto Arias Salgado
- Otto Sirgo as Guillermo 'Memo' Beltrán
- Juan Peláez as Antonio
- Ariadna Welter as Leonor Salgado de Arias
- Juan Luis Galiardo as Pedro
- María Montaño
- Jorge Patiño
- Mario Cid
- Rocío Chazaro
- Leopoldo Salazar (as Polo Salazar)
- Roberto Ballesteros
- Carlos Pouliot
- Patricia Durán
- Elsa de los Ríos
- Luz María Peña

== Reception ==
In her book Sara García: Ícono cinematográfico mexicano, abuela y lesbiana, Ileana Baeza Lope cites the film as one of the exceptions to the tendency in Mexican cinema of "affective relationships between women [being] relegated to the sidelines", while "male camaraderie relationships were in the foreground".

== Bibliography ==
- Amador, María Luisa; Ayala Blanco, Jorge. Cartelera cinematográfica, 1980-1989. UNAM, 2006.
- Baeza Lope, Ileana. Sara García: Ícono cinematográfico mexicano, abuela y lesbiana. Argus-a Artes y Humanidades, 2018.
