= The Loving Ones =

- Directed by: Rafael Portillo
- Written by: Víctor Manuel Castro; Francisco Cavazos
- Starring: Sasha Montenegro
- Cinematography: Miguel Araña
- Music by: Gustavo César Carrión
- Production company: Cinematográfica Calderón
- Release date: 17 May 1979
- Running time: 105 minutes
- Country: Mexico
- Language: Spanish

The Loving Ones (Spanish:Las cariñosas) is a 1979 Mexican comedy film directed by Rafael Portillo.

== Cast ==
- Juan Alonso
- Pepe Arévalo
- Carlos Bravo y Fernandez
- Yari Caballero as Fichera
- Víctor Manuel Castro
- Arturo Cobo
- Luis de Alba
- Yadira Del Valle as Fichera
- Leandro M. Espinosa
- Susana Galli as Fichera
- Joaquín García Vargas
- Mayte Gerald
- Christian Grants as Fichera
- Barbara Ham as Fichera
- Rafael Inclán
- Jessica Kuri as Fichera
- Rossy Lamarque as Fichera
- Jazmin Lee as Fichera
- Sonia Lima as Fichera
- Marina
- Lyn May
- Mayka
- Sasha Montenegro
- Yara Moreno as Fichera
- Mike Moroff
- Vicky Nevarez as Fichera
- Yolanda Perkins as Fichera
- Sonia Piña
- Jorge Rivero
- Gabriela Ríos
- Carmen Salinas
- Alfredo Solares
- Enrique Sánchez
- Manuel 'Loco' Valdés
- Isela Vega
- Gabriela Villeli as Fichera
- Alfonso Zayas

== Bibliography ==
- Charles Ramírez Berg. Cinema of Solitude: A Critical Study of Mexican Film, 1967-1983. University of Texas Press, 2010.
