= Ironmaster (film) =

- Directed by: Umberto Lenzi
- Screenplay by: Alberto Cavallone; Lea Martino; Dardano Sacchetti; Gabriel Rossini; Umberto Lenzi
- Story by: Luciano Martino; Alberto Cavallone
- Produced by: Luciano Martino
- Starring: Sam Pasco; Elvire Audray; George Eastman; Pamela Prati
- Cinematography: Giancarlo Ferrando
- Edited by: Eugenio Alabiso
- Music by: Guido De Angelis
- Production companies: Nuova Dania Cinematografica; Medusa Distribuzione; Imp. Ex. Ci.; Les Film Jacques Leitienne
- Release date: 10 March 1983 (Italy)
- Countries: Italy; France

Ironmaster (Italian: La guerra del ferro: Ironmaster) is a 1983 film directed by Umberto Lenzi.

== Production ==
After the surprise box office hit of Jean-Jacques Annaud's film Quest for Fire (1981) in Italy, several film productions followed mimicking the film's style. These included films like Lucio Fulci's Conquest (1983) and Umberto Lenzi's Ironmaster.

Ironmaster was filmed on location at Custer State Park in South Dakota with interiors shot at RPA-Elios Studios in Rome.

== Release ==
Ironmaster was released in Italy on 10 March 1983. The film was released on Blu-ray on 23 January 2017 in North America by Code Red and on 10 April 2017 in the United Kingdom by 88 Films.

== Reception ==
According to Michael Klossner, author of Prehistoric Humans in Film and Television, while Ironmaster received "few and very bad notices [and is] simple, only modestly ambitious and has its share of flaws … it's hard not to like a film which shows intelligent, articulate prehistoric people making discoveries, facing moral issues and showing capacity for great evil and finally for good." Hal Erickson wrote in AllMovie that "Seldom has there been a more predictable 98 minutes' worth of Sword and Sorcery, but that doesn't mean it isn't enjoyable."
