= Carnival Nights =

1978 films

- Directed by: Rafael Portillo
- Written by: Víctor Manuel Castro; Francisco Cavazos
- Produced by: Guillermo Calderon
- Starring: Jorge Rivero; Sasha Montenegro; Carmen Salinas
- Cinematography: Miguel Araña
- Edited by: Jorge Bustos
- Music by: Gustavo César Carrión
- Production company: Cinematográfica Calderón
- Release date: 6 July 1978
- Running time: 105 minutes
- Country: Mexico
- Language: Spanish

Carnival Nights (Spanish: Noches de cabaret) is a 1978 Mexican comedy drama film directed by Rafael Portillo and starring Jorge Rivero, Sasha Montenegro and Carmen Salinas.

== Cast ==
- Jorge Rivero
- Sasha Montenegro
- Carmen Salinas
- Eduardo de la Peña
- Irma Serrano "La Tigresa"
- Lyn May
- Norma Baeza
- Víctor Manuel Castro
- Arturo Cobo
- Luis de Alba
- Belinda Falcon
- Rafael Inclán
- Roxy Lamarque
- Martha Lorena
- Olga Manzolli
- Pancho Muller
- Lupita Muñoz
- Polo Ortín
- Sonia Piña
- Maricarmen Resendez
- America Rios
- Rosella
- Gabriela Ríos
- Paco Sañudo
- Carlos Suarez
- Olga Swan
- Claudia Tate
- Rita Valencia
- Pedro Weber 'Chatanuga'
- Liza Willert
- Princesa Yamal
- Alfonso Zayas

== Bibliography ==
- Charles Ramírez Berg. Cinema of Solitude: A Critical Study of Mexican Film, 1967-1983. University of Texas Press, 2010.
