= Sublime redención =

Mexican telenovela

- Genre: Telenovela; Romance; Drama
- Directed by: Rafael Banquells
- Starring: José Baviera; Alicia Bonet; Gregorio Casal; Irma Dorantes; Ofelia Guilmáin
- Country of origin: Mexico
- Original language: Spanish
- No. of episodes: 70

Production
- Running time: 30 minutes

Original release
- Network: Telesistema Mexicano
- Release: 1971 – 1971

Sublime redención (English title:Amazing redemption) is a Mexican telenovela by Televisa in 1971 for Telesistema Mexicano.

== Cast ==
- José Baviera
- Alicia Bonet
- Gregorio Casal
- Irma Dorantes
- Ofelia Guilmáin
- José Gálvez
- Antonio de Hud
- Delia Magaña
- Carmen Salinas
- Gonzalo Vega
