= The Pulque Tavern =

- Directed by: Víctor Manuel Castro
- Written by: Víctor Manuel Castro; Francisco Cavazos; Guillermo Contreras
- Produced by: Guillermo Calderon
- Starring: Sasha Montenegro
- Cinematography: Miguel Araña
- Edited by: Jorge Bustos
- Music by: Gustavo César Carrión
- Production company: Cinematográfica Calderón
- Release date: 25 June 1981
- Running time: 105 minutes
- Country: Mexico
- Language: Spanish

The Pulque Tavern (Spanish:La pulquería) is a 1981 Mexican comedy film directed by Víctor Manuel Castro.

== Cast ==
- Norma Alvarado
- Sonia Camacho
- America Cisneros
- Arturo Cobo
- Mari Carmen Conde
- Enrique Cuenca
- Luis de Alba
- Guillermo de Alvarado
- Victor Manuel Castro
- Michelle Dubois
- César Escalero
- Margarito Esparza Nevare
- Isaura Espinoza
- Mayte Gerald
- Michel Grayeb
- Lucía Gálvez
- Manuel 'Flaco' Ibáñez
- Gloria Alicia Inclán
- Rafael Inclán
- Héctor Kiev
- Carolina Magaña
- Patty Martínez
- Jeannette Mass
- Jorge Mondragon
- Sasha Montenegro
- Xorge Noble as El Sapo
- Ruben 'El Púas' Olivares
- Polo Ortín
- Doris Pavel
- Roberto G. Rivera
- Jorge Rivero
- Carmen Salinas
- Shandira
- Rebeca Silva
- Alfredo Solares
- Rafael Torres
- Manuel 'Loco' Valdés
- Isela Vega
- Pedro Weber 'Chatanuga'
- Alfonso Zayas

== Bibliography ==
- Charles Ramírez Berg. Cinema of Solitude: A Critical Study of Mexican Film, 1967-1983. University of Texas Press, 2010.
