= Frank Moro =

American actor

- Born: January 11, 1944; Holguin, Cuba
- Died: June 21, 1993 (aged 49); Miami, Florida, United States
- Occupation: Actor
- Years active: 1968–1993

Frank Moro (January 11, 1944 – June 21, 1993) was a Cuban–American film and television actor.

== Selected filmography ==
- The Kidnapping of Lola (1986)
- Lola the Truck Driver 3 (1991)

== Bibliography ==
- Ryan Rashotte. Narco Cinema: Sex, Drugs, and Banda Music in Mexico's B-Filmography. Palgrave Macmillan, 2015.
