= The Infernal Rapist =

- VHS release cover art
- Spanish: El violador infernal
- Directed by: Damián Acosta Esparza
- Written by: Cristóbal Martell
- Produced by: Ulises Pérez Aguirre
- Starring: Noé Murayama; Princesa Lea; Ana Luisa Peluffo; Marisol Cervantes; Manuel 'Flaco' Ibáñez; Fidel Abrego; Luis Avendaño; Ramón Gaona
- Edited by: Maximino Sánchez Molina
- Release date: 1988
- Running time: 83 min.
- Country: Mexico
- Language: Spanish

The Infernal Rapist (Spanish: El violador infernal) is a 1988 Mexican horror and thriller film directed by Damián Acosta Esparza. The film stars Noé Murayama, Princesa Lea, Ana Luisa Peluffo, Marisol Cervantes, Manuel 'Flaco' Ibáñez and Fidel Abregoin.

== Plot ==
Notorious serial rapist Carlos "El Gato" is condemened to death by electric chair. Upon his execution he is offered a deal by Satan who appears in the form of a seductive woman. Satan promises him all the drugs and wealth imaginable in exchange for raping and murdering men and women in her name.

== Cast ==
- Noé Murayama
- Princesa Lea
- Ana Luisa Peluffo
- Marisol Cervantes
- Manuel 'Flaco' Ibáñez
- Fidel Abrego
- Luis Avendaño
- Ramón Gaona

== Home media ==
The film was restored in 4K resolution from its 35mm original camera negative and released on Blu-ray by Vinegar Syndrome, an American home video distribution company, in 2023.
