= Lola the Truck Driver =

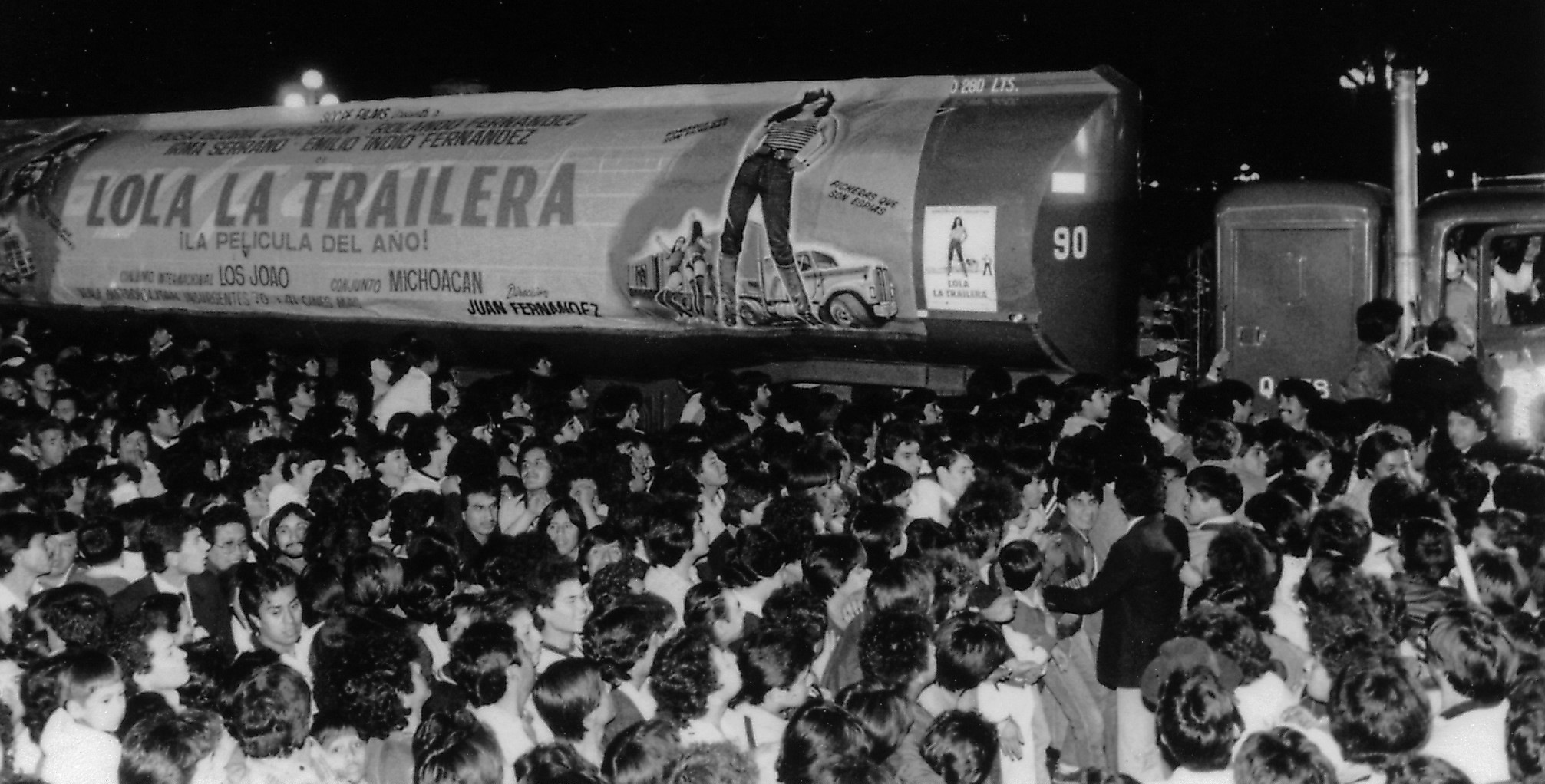
- The film's premiere.
- Directed by: Raúl Fernández
- Written by: Carlos Valdemar; Rolando Fernández
- Produced by: Gerardo Martinez; Eugenio Nolasco; Xavier Rezzo; Fidel Valadez
- Starring: Rosa Gloria Chagoyán; Rolando Fernández; Irma Serrano "La Tigresa"
- Cinematography: Laura Ferlo
- Edited by: Jorge Rivera
- Music by: Jonathan Zarbaya; Jonathan Zarzosa
- Production company: Scope Films
- Release date: 1983
- Running time: 105 minutes
- Country: Mexico
- Language: Spanish

Lola the Truck Driver (Spanish: Lola la trailera) is a 1983 Mexican action film directed by Raúl Fernández and starring Rosa Gloria Chagoyán, Rolando Fernández and Irma Serrano "La Tigresa". After her father is murdered, a young woman begins driving his truck so it won't be repossessed. With the help of an undercover detective, she tackles a major drugs baron.

The film was a major commercial success on its release, earning $1 million in Mexico and $2.5 million in the United States. This represented a large profit for its backers who had spent $150,000 on the production. Several sequels starring Rosa Gloria Chagoyán as Lola followed beginning with The Kidnapping of Lola in 1986, as well as other films that tried to copy its style.

== Plot ==
Lola is the daughter of a truck driver who is killed by a drug gang after he refuses to smuggle drugs across the US-Mexico border. Lola inherits the truck, and seeks justice by fighting the gang with the assistance of an undercover agent.

== Cast ==
- Rosa Gloria Chagoyán as Lola Chagano
- Rolando Fernández as Jorge Stander, undercover detective
- Irma Serrano "La Tigresa" as Flor de Lotos / Alondra
- Emilio 'El indio' Fernández as Leoncio's Bodyguard
- Edna Bolkan as Leoncio's Girl
- Milton Rodríguez as Leoncio Cardenas, drug lord
- María Cardinal as Leoncio's Girl
- Sergio Ramos as Customer at Ana Paula's
- Carmelina Encinas as Leoncio's Girl
- Miguel Manzano as Lola's Father
- Roberto Cañedo as Chief of Police Detectives
- Ricardo Carrión as Trailer Driver in Brawl
- Ismael Rojas as Leoncio's Bodyguard
- Manolo Fregoso
- Gerardo Martínez
- Ernesto Pruneda
- Lola Manzano as Leoncio's Girl
- Manuel Garza
- Enrique Diaz M.
- Ruben Fernandez
- Fausto Calvo
- Juan Carlos Talamantes
- Isaias Valdez as
- José Reyes
- Juan Cruz Gonzalez
- Fannie Kauffman 'Vitola' as Ana Paula
- Joaquín García Vargas as Lola's Godfather
- Socorro Bonilla as Leoncio's Girl
- Charly Valentino as Customer at Ana Paula's
- Lucía Gálvez as Leoncio's Girl
- Paco Sañudo as Gay at Ana Paula's
- Carlos East as Leoncio's Bodyguard
- Salvador Julian as Leoncio's Bodyguard
- Nora Larraga 'Karla' as Leoncio's Girl

== Bibliography ==
- Mora, Carl J. Mexican Cinema: Reflections of a Society, 1896-2004. McFarland & Co, 2005.
