= Rafael Portillo =

Mexican film director, screenwriter and film editor (1916-1995)

- Born: November 11, 1916; Mexico City, Mexico
- Died: November 30, 1995 (aged 79); Mexico City, Mexico
- Occupations: Director, Screenwriter, Editor
- Years active: 1943–1989

Rafael Portillo (1916–1995) was a Mexican film director, screenwriter and film editor.

== Selected filmography ==
=== Director ===
- The Ghost Falls In Love (1953)
- A Life in the Balance (1955)
- The Aztec Mummy (1957)
- The Curse of the Aztec Mummy (1957)
- The Robot vs. The Aztec Mummy (1958)
- Music and Money (1958)
- Carnival Nights (1978)
- The Loving Ones (1979)
- Midnight Dolls (1979)

=== Editor ===
- The Hour of Truth (1945)
- The Three Garcias (1947)
- The Garcias Return (1947)
- The Bewitched House (1949)
- Full Speed Ahead (1951)
- What Has That Woman Done to You? (1951)
- Kill Me Because I'm Dying! (1951)
- Girls in Uniform (1951)
- Mexican Bus Ride (1952)

== Bibliography ==
- Charles Ramírez Berg. Cinema of Solitude: A Critical Study of Mexican Film, 1967-1983. University of Texas Press, 2010.
