= Bellas de noche =

1975 film by Miguel M. Delgado

- Directed by: Miguel M. Delgado
- Written by: Francisco Cavazos; Víctor Manuel Castro
- Produced by: Guillermo Calderòn
- Starring: Sasha Montenegro; Jorge Rivero; Rosa Carmina
- Cinematography: Miguel Araña
- Music by: Gustavo Cesar Carrión
- Distributed by: Cinematográfica Calderón SA
- Release date: 25 September 1975
- Running time: 98 minutes
- Country: Mexico
- Language: Spanish

Bellas de noche (in English Ladies of the Night), also known as Las ficheras, is a Mexican film directed by Miguel M. Delgado. It was filmed in 1974 and starring Sasha Montenegro and Jorge Rivero. It is regarded as the film that began the rise of Mexican sex comedies film genre as a largely mainstream genre in the Mexican Cinema for about a decade and a half; the term "fichera" coming to mean the entire genre.

== Plot ==
The Boxer Germán Bronco Torres (Jorge Rivero) loses his license, and works as bouncer at the cabaret El Pirulí (The Lollipop), where he falls for the fichera Carmen (Sasha Montenegro), and befriends the pimp Margarito Fuensanta 'El Vaselinas' (Eduardo de la Peña), who lost a bet and has to pay it to some gangsters. For 500 pesos for 'El Vaselinas', 'Bronco' prepares a trap in the cabaret to the taxi driver Raul (Enrique Novi), to seduce his girlfriend, not knowing that the victim is his own sister Lupita (Leticia Perdigón). When he discovers the situation, he hits the driver and send him to prison. Raúl sold his taxi so He can pay bail. El Vaselinas pretends to be dead in order to get rid of his creditors. The cabaret is closed and everybody begins a new life. In the adventures of these characters, appended the alcoholic woman known as La Corcholata (Carmen Salinas), a sympathetic woman trying to sneak to the cabaret, and the history of the owner of the cabaret, Don Atenógenes (Raúl 'Chato' Padilla), and his wife, the mistress of the brothel, Maria Teresa (Rosa Carmina).

== Production ==
The film is an adaptation of the stage play by Francisco Cavazos Las ficheras. In 1975, the film packed the movie theaters in Mexico City for 26 weeks. It was a production of Cinematográfica Calderón and was directed by Miguel M. Delgado. The Mexican Government censorship prohibited the previous title of the film (Fichera is a derogatory way of calling a cabaret woman in Mexico). Therefore, as a "tribute" to Luis Buñuel, the screenwriter Victor Manuel Castro took the title of the film Belle de Jour.

== Cast ==
- Sasha Montenegro as Carmen
- Jorge Rivero as Germán "Bronco" Torres
- Rosa Carmina as María Teresa
- Raúl 'Chato' Padilla as Don Atenógenes
- Leticia Perdigón as Lupita
- Carmen Salinas as La Corcholata
- Enrique Novi as Raúl
- Eduardo de la Peña as El Vaselinas
- Mabel Luna as La Muñeca
- Víctor Manuel Castro as Fabián
- Rafael Inclán as El MovidAS
