= Víctor Manuel Castro =

Mexican actor, screenwriter and film director

- Born: 1924; Mexico City, Mexico
- Died: 17 December 2011 (aged 86–87); Mexico City, Mexico
- Occupations: Screenwriter, actor, director
- Years active: 1947–2007

Víctor Manuel Eduardo Castro Arozamena (1924–2011) was a Mexican actor, screenwriter and film director.

== Filmography ==
- Voices of Spring (1947)
- Love for Sale (1951)
- The Unknown Mariachi (1953)
- Raffles (1958)
- Golden Legs (1958)
- Carnival Nights (1978)
- Midnight Dolls (1979)
- The Loving Ones (1979)
- The Pulque Tavern (1981)

== Bibliography ==
- Charles Ramírez Berg. Cinema of Solitude: A Critical Study of Mexican Film, 1967-1983. University of Texas Press, 2010.
