= Enrique Molina Sobrino =

Mexican businessman

Enrique Molina Sobrino is a Mexican businessman known for creating the biggest Pepsi bottling group in Mexico, named Gemex. He also created a business empire in the production of sugar. In 2002 he sold Pepsi Group in Mexico to The Pepsi Bottling Group, the largest Pepsi bottler in the world partially owned by Pepsi, for 1.5 billion dollars.

Molina also was part owner of Grupo Financiero Banamex when it was privatized by the Salinas administration. Banamex is now owned by Citibank.

== Personal life ==
He is married to Mexican actress Angelica Chain.

== See also ==
- List of Mexicans
