= Joseph Fichera =

American business executive

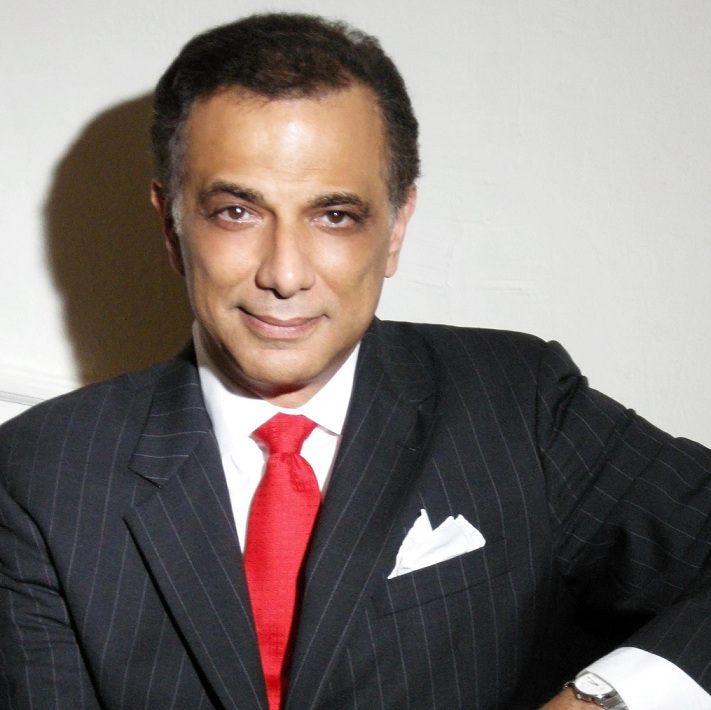
- Born: Joseph Sebastian Fichera; Rochester, New York
- Education: Princeton University (A.B.); Yale School of Management (M.B.A.)
- Known for: Founder, Saber Partners, LLC
- Website: Joseph Fichera bio

Joseph Sebastian Fichera is an American business executive known primarily for his work in the fields of investment banking and financial services. He is the CEO of Saber Partners, LLC, a public advisory firm that he co-founded in 2000. Prior to Saber, he worked for various Wall Street firms including Smith Barney, Harris Upham & Company, Prudential Securities and Bear Stearns & Co., as a managing director, principal.

Fichera is the creator of share-adjusted broker-remarketed equity securities, also known as SABRES, as an alternative to auction rate securities. He is also considered an expert at auction rate securities, serving as an expert advisor for the U.S. Securities and Exchange Commission. Fichera was also one of California Governor Gray Davis' advisors, assisting with the California electricity crisis that took place in 2000 and 2001.

== Early life and education ==
Fichera was born in Rochester, New York in 1954, his father a bookkeeper and his mother a hairdresser. His grandfather was a barber who emigrated from Sicily in 1910. Fichera grew up in Rochester and as a teenager was outspoken about racial desegregation of Rochester schools in the 1960s, becoming a student representative on the Board of Education for Rochester New York. Fichera earned a full tuition scholarship to Princeton University, where he graduated with an A.B. from the Woodrow Wilson School of Public and International Affairs in 1976 after completing a senior thesis titled "Politics, Personality and Budgeting in the States: The Case of New Jersey."

Upon graduation, Fichera worked as a political appointee for the Department of Housing and Urban Development during the administration of Jimmy Carter. He left HUD three years later to attend the Yale School of Management, obtaining an M.B.A. from the school in 1982.

== Career ==
Fichera began his financial career with Morgan Stanley Wealth Management, then known as Smith Barney, Harris Upham & Company. It was during his time with Smith Barney that he gained experience in the auction-rate market and challenges to it, landing ExxonMobil as a client in 1987. He advised Exxon on how to reduce interest costs by adjusting rates and repricing periods on its tax-exempt debt and selling them when conditions were more favorable. Fichera also advised them not to sell auction rate securities, instead leading them to share-adjusted broker-remarketed equity securities (known as SABRES), an alternative to auction rate securities created by Fichera in 1988. Exxon made a $750 million deal with Smith Barney, the largest single program of variable preferred stock up until that time. He held the position of Vice President of Corporate Finance before moving on to Bear Stearns & Co in 1989 as one of that company's directors of corporate finance and also spent time with Prudential Securities.

Fichera left Prudential in 2000 to form Saber Partners, a public advisory firm based in New York. He founded the firm along with William B. Moore, the CEO of Westar Energy from 2007 to 2011. Some of the firm's first clients included Exxon Corporation and the Governor of the State of California. The firm became notable for its work in the $40 billion securitization bond market for ratepayer bonds that are used to fund power utilities. Fichera pushed for the United Kingdom's Financial Services Authority to recognize ratepayer bonds as a form of government guaranteed debt, allowing the bonds to be sold to investors in the United Kingdom and other European countries at a lower rate than investors in the United States. The new marketplace reduced the interest cost that utilities paid on interest for the bonds. Fichera worked with government regulators in Wisconsin, Texas, Vermont, New Jersey, Florida and West Virginia with ratepayer bonds.

Fichera's Saber Partners partnered with The Blackstone Group to advise then Governor Gray Davis during the California electricity crisis of 2000 and 2001, on the state's potential acquisition of the investor-owned utilities electric transmission lines. The results included potentially selling of up to $33 billion of bonds to save utility companies from going bankrupt and stabilize the electricity market. Fichera has been a consistent critic of auction rate securities. In 2006, he was hired by the U.S. Securities and Exchange Commission as an expert advisor into its probe of security bidding practices. Its investigation led to a cease and desist order being issued to 15 banks, all of whom settled with the SEC for $13 million without having to admit any violations.

He has advocated greater transparency in securities markets, especially for corporate securitized and asset-backed debt. In November 2014, in a New York Times op-ed, Fichera also proposed that the S.E.C. adopt a points system in addition to fines similar to a D.M.V. in order to change the behavior of repeat offenders through a more effective deterrent.

As an expert on auction rate securities, Fichera is often quoted on the subject by major news publications including The New York Times, The Wall Street Journal, and Bloomberg Businessweek. He also has served as an adjunct visiting lecturer in public and international affairs at the Woodrow Wilson School of Public and International Affairs at Princeton University. In April 2018, Fichera received The National Italian American Foundation Special Achievement Award in Finance for his "considerable accomplishments in the world of corporate finance."
