= Rosa Gloria Chagoyán =

Mexican actress and singer

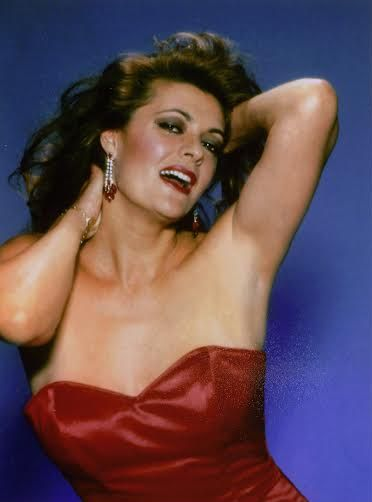
- Born: Rosa Gloria Chagoyán; Mexico City, Mexico
- Occupation: Actress
- Years active: 1973–present

Rosa Gloria Chagoyán (Spanish pronunciation: [ˈrosa ˈɣlorja tʃaɣoˈʝan]; Armenian: Ռոզա Գլորիա Չագոյան); is a Mexican actress and singer of Armenian descent.

== Biography ==
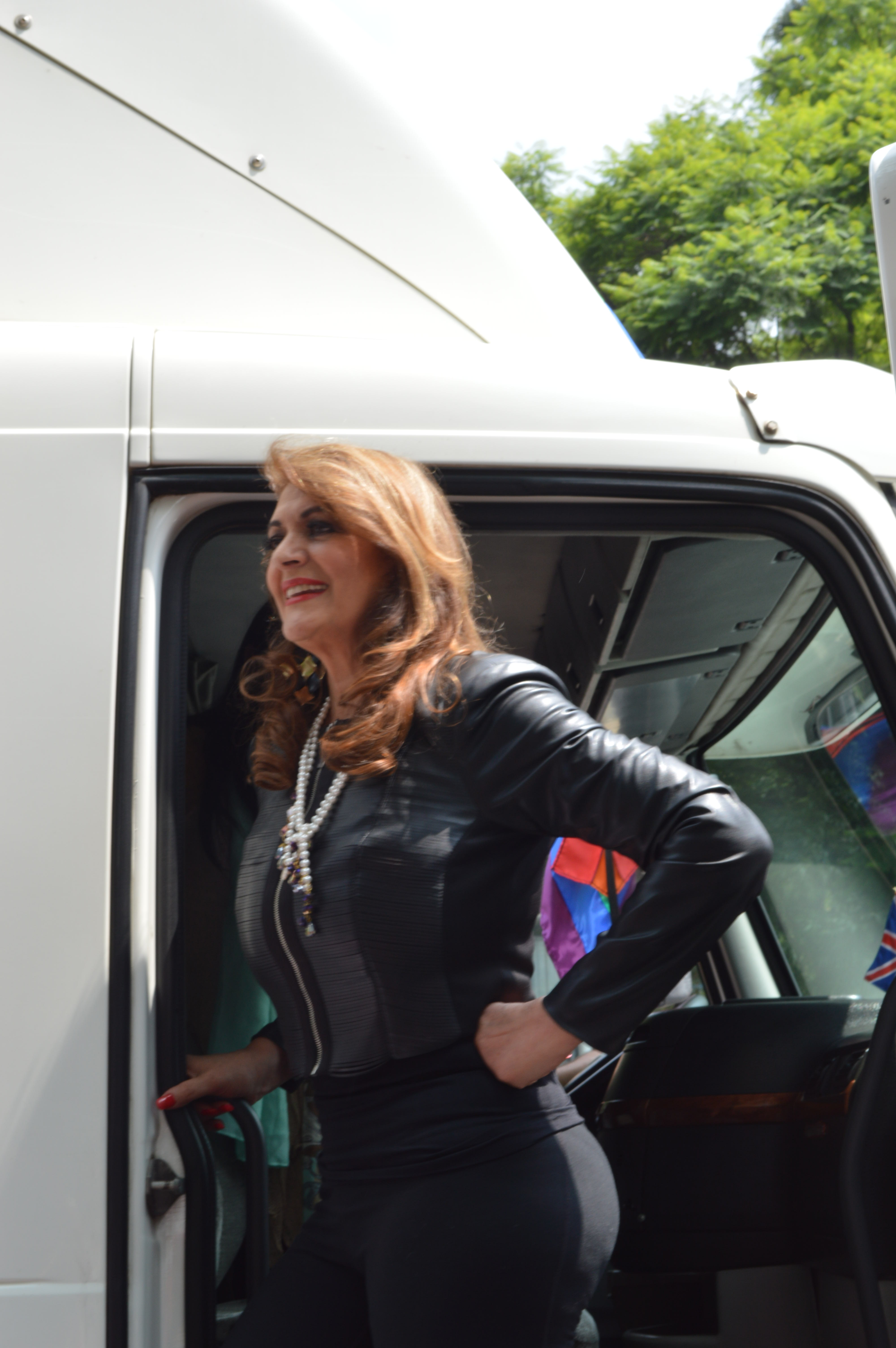
Chagoyán in the 2016 Pride March of Mexico city.

Chagoyán started her career as a radio host. She entered the world of acting in 1973 as an actress in El Diablo en Persona and appeared in some low-budget films throughout the seventies. She became known for the character "Lola la Trailera" (Lola, the truck driver) that made her a Mexican action film icon. Chagoyán lived in the United States for several years. She returned to Mexico to participate in Central de abasto, a 2009 Mexican telenovela. Later in 2023, Chagoyán appeared in the telenovela Mi camino es amarte, reprising her role as Lola la Trailera.

== Personal life ==
Chagoyán is married to Mexican actor and producer Rolando Fernández. They have a son, the singer Emilio Fernández.

== Filmography ==
=== Films ===
- Instructions Not Included (2013)
- Juana la cubana (1994)
- Lola the Truck Driver 3 (1991)
- La vengadora 2 (1991)
- La guerrera vengadora (1988)
- La rielera (1988)
- pistoleros asesinos (1986)
- Río de oro (1986)
- Maten al fugitivo (1986)
- El secuestro de Lola (1985)
- Cruz de olvido (1984)
- Los humillados (1984)
- Lola the Truck Driver (1983)
- Las ovejas descarriadas (1983)
- Mi abuelo, mi perro y yo (1983)
- Los cuates de la Rosenda (1982)
- Herencia de muerte (1981)
- El caín del Bajío (1981)
- El látigo contra las momias asesinas (1980)
- Pesadilla mortal (1980)
- Ay Chihuahua no te rajes! (1980)
- El jinete de la muerte (1980)
- El cortado (1979)
- Alguien tiene que morir (1979)
- Un cura de locura (1979)
- El giro, el pinto y el colorado (1979)
- El taxista millonario (1979)
- El circo de Capulina (1978)
- Mariachi - Fiesta de Sangre (1977)
- Los desarraigados (1976)
- Presagio (1975)
- El caballo torero (1973)
- El diablo en persona (1973)

=== Telenovelas ===
- Mi camino es amarte (2023)
- Amor de Juventud (2015)
- La Consentida (2014)
- Sortilegio (2009)
- Central de abasto (2009)
- Playa tropical (2002)
- Dos a quererse (1977)
- Mundos opuestos (1975)

=== Discography ===
- Rosa Gloria y sus Traileros (1991)
