= María de Lourdes (singer) =

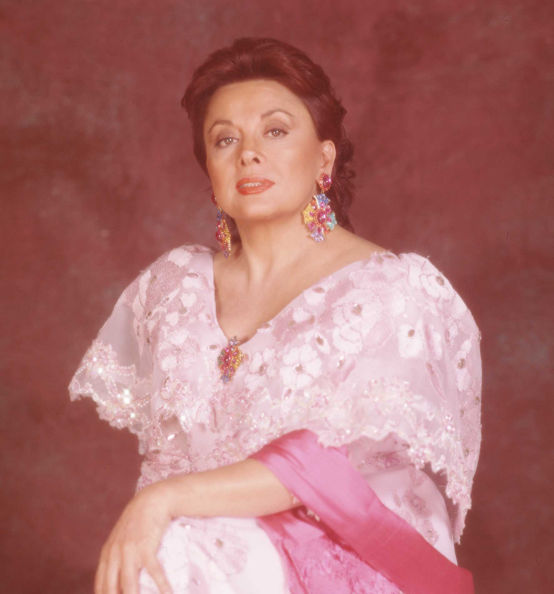

Background information
- Also known as: La Embajadora de la Canción Mexicana, La Voz de Mexico, La Reina del Mariachi
- Born: María de Lourdes Pérez López; December 30, 1939; Mexico City
- Died: November 6, 1997 (aged 57) Schiphol, The Netherlands
- Genres: Ranchera, mariachi, bolero and other traditional Mexican song types
- Years active: 1954-1997
- Labels: Columbia; Orfeón; Peerless; Philips

María de Lourdes Pérez López (Mexico City, 30 December 1939 – Amsterdam, 6 November 1997) was a Mexican actress and singer, specialized in the musical genres of ranchera, mariachi, bolero and other forms of traditional Mexican music during the Golden Age of Mexican cinema. Her album Mujer Importante was nominated for a Grammy Award for Best Mexican-American Performance in 1986. In Mexico she was known as "The ambassador of the Mexican Song" and "The Voice of Mexico".

== Life and career ==
María de Lourdes was born in Mexico-City in 1939. Her father was Alberto Pérez Beltrán, schoolteacher, and her mother was Emilia López Santoyo. As a small child, María de Lourdes lived for five years in Zetal, Veracruz where her father was posted. The family returned to Tepito in Mexico-City where María de Lourdes spent most of her youth. She spent a year on the ranch of her uncle in Uriangato, Guanajuato. In Mexico-City she followed a business course and worked a short while as a secretary at a tannery.

From an early age María de Lourdes showed her talent as a singer. She would sing pastorelas in school and traditional Mexican songs at family gatherings. María de Lourdes participated in a talent show at radio station XEW and obtained a contract at radio station XEQ which got her noticed. At the age of 17, in 1957 she was offered a couple of small roles as singer in movies.

Her first album, Así es mi tierra, came out in 1961. In 1963, at the 61st sessions of the International Olympic Committee, Mexico-City was designated host of the 1968 Olympic Games. María de Lourdes was asked to contribute to Mexico's international goodwill-campaign and Miguel Alemán Valdés, at the time chairman of the National Tourism Board, named her Ambassador of the Mexican Song. In 1963, upon an invitation of President Sukarno, María de Lourdes performed at the Games of the New Emerging Forces in Jakarta. An international tour ensued. María de Lourdes was well received in Japan, where she brought out an album in 1965. In 1971 she was invited to sing for emperor Hirohito.

Also in Mexico María de Lourdes became a famous singer. In the 1960s and 1970s she was a frequent guest of the national television show Noches Tapatías and in 1976 she hosted the show. In 1974 she scored her biggest hit with Juan Zaizar's song Cruz de Olvido.

She continued to receive invitations to perform for high-level visitors, such as the visit of German President Walter Scheel to Mexico in 1977. In 1986 her album Mujer Importante was nominated for a Grammy award in the category Best Mexican-American Performance.

María de Lourdes was invited by Queen Beatrix in 1991 to sing Las Mañanitas at the 80th birthday of her father, Prince Bernhard. During this trip she also gave a show in Amsterdam that was recorded live and broadcast on national television. It gave her instant popularity in the Netherlands and contracts for albums and tours. In November 1997, after another tour through the Netherlands, María de Lourdes collapsed and died because of a heart-attack. When her remains arrived in Mexico-City, thousands of followers filled Garibaldi-square, bode a last farewell and sang Cruz de Olvido.

== Discography ==
- Así es mi tierra (1961)
- Las Palomas (1961)
- La voz del sentimiento (1963)
- La canción mexicana (1964)
- The rose of Mexico (1965)
- La canción mexicana (1967)
- Mi derrota (1968)
- Voz de México (1968)
- The voice of Mexico (1969)
- Una voz que habla de Mexico (1969)
- Voz, estilo y sentimiento (1970)
- Viva México (1971)
- Con el sol de frente (1972)
- La voz del sentimiento v.3 (1968)
- Es México...(1973)
- Cruz de olvido (1974)
- Anatomía musical (1974)
- Nuevas canciones y más éxitos (1975)
- Lo mejor de María de lourdes (1975)
- Música de México (1976)
- Música de México II (1976)
- Música de México III (1976)
- La voz diferente (1977)
- Al estilo de María de Lourdes (1977)
- María de Lourdes (1977)
- Mi ranchito (1980)
- Por donde vayas (1982)
- Mujer importante (1984)
- Con algo nuevo (1985)
- Canto a mi México y al amor (1990)
- Viejos amigos (1990)
- Para Pepe Guizar (1991)
- Interpreta.. (1991)

== Filmography ==
María de Lourdes performed as a singer in at least five movies, among which:

- 1958: Los Mujeriegos
- 1958: El Rayo de Sinaloa (La venganza de Heraclio Bernal)
- 1958: La Rebellión de la Sierra
- 1958: Una golfa

She was an actress in at least six movies, among which:

- 1965: Los tales por cuales
- 1965: El Tigre de Guanajuato: Leyenda de venganza
- 1974: Hermanos de sangre

María de Lourdes participated many times in television shows, among which:

- 1970: Glücksspirale, German television documentary
- 1960s and 70s: Noches Tapatías, both as guest and as host (1976)
- 2004: Pastorelas de Navidad, based on archived clips
