= Isela Vega =

Mexican actress (1939–2021)

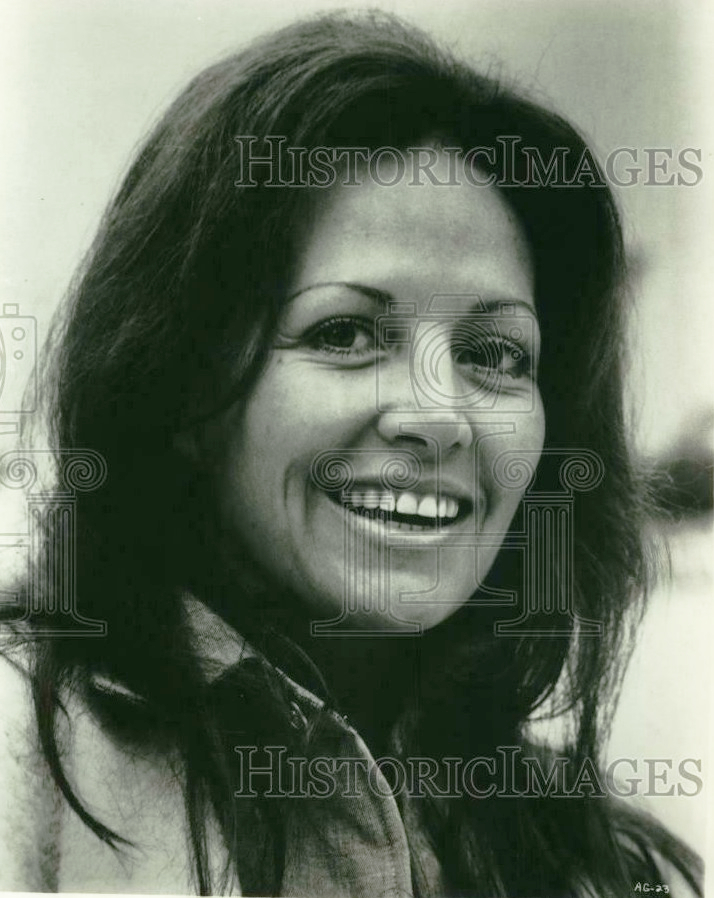
- Vega in 1974
- Born: Isela Vega Durazo; 5 November 1939; Hermosillo, Sonora, Mexico
- Died: 9 March 2021 (aged 81); Mexico City, Mexico
- Occupations: Actress, singer-songwriter, producer, director, screenwriter
- Partner(s): Alberto Vázquez, Jorge Luke
- Children: 2

Isela Vega Durazo (5 November 1939 – 9 March 2021) was a Mexican actress, singer-songwriter, producer, director and screenwriter. She won four Ariel Awards (once for Best Actress and thrice for Best Supporting Actress), as well as the Golden Ariel in 2017.

== Early life ==
Vega was born and raised in Hermosillo, Sonora. In 1957, Vega was chosen as "Princess of the Carnival" in Hermosillo. Shortly afterwards, she began modeling.

== Career ==
In 1960, Vega began her acting career. In 1969, she released an album of her singing. Vega's most internationally known role is that of Elita in Sam Peckinpah's Bring Me the Head of Alfredo Garcia (1974). The film features a track titled "Bennie's Song", which she wrote. Vega was subsequently photographed nude for the July 1974 issue of Playboy magazine. She was the first Latina model to do so.

Vega won four Ariel Awards for acting, as well as the Golden Ariel in 2017.

In the 1980s, Vega made her debut behind the camera by writing, producing and directing a number of films. She was called to sing the songs "Amanecí en tus brazos" and "El Siete Mares" in the 1986 film Gringo mojado. Overall, Vega participated in 150 movies.

== Personal life ==
Vega had a son named Arturo with singer Alberto Vázquez, with whom she had a short-lived troubled relationship, but never married; and a daughter, Shaula, who is an actress and dancer, from her long lasting relationship with the actor Jorge Luke.

=== Death ===
Vega died of metastasis in Mexico City on March 9, 2021, at the age of 81.

== Filmography ==
=== As actress ===
- 1960: Verano violento
- 1963: La rabia por dentro
- 1966: Rage
- 1967: Don Juan 67
- 1967: Mujeres, mujeres, mujeres
- 1967: SOS Conspiracion Bikini
- 1968: El deseo llega de noche
- 1968: La Cama
- 1968: Las pecadoras
- 1968: Las sicodélicas – Daliliah
- 1968: Por mis pistolas – Lupita Sanchez
- 1968: Fear Chamber – Helga
- 1969: Cuernos debajo de La Cama – Elsa
- 1969: El matrimonio es como el demonio
- 1969: Enigma de muerte
- 1969: La señora Muerte – Lisa
- 1969: Las golfas – Oti
- 1969: Las impuras
- 1969: Las luchadoras contra el robot asesino
- 1969: Las Pirañas aman en Cuaresma – Lala
- 1969: Pacto diabólico
- 1970: El oficio más antiguo del mundo – Yolanda
- 1970: La buscona
- 1970: Prohibido
- 1971: El sabor de la venganza (Taste of the Savage) – Sara Carson
- 1971: La hora desnuda
- 1971: La primavera de los escorpiones
- 1971: Las reglas del juego – Verónica
- 1971: Temporada salvaje
- 1972: Basuras humanas – Laura
- 1972: El festín de la loba
- 1972: Fin de fiesta – Silvia
- 1973: The Deadly Trackers – Maria
- 1973: Volveré a nacer – Mónica
- 1974: Bring Me the Head of Alfredo Garcia – Elita
- 1975: El llanto de la tortuga – Diana
- 1976: Celestina – Melibea
- 1976: Drum – Marianna
- 1976: Joshua – Mexican Woman
- 1976: La India – La India
- 1977: Acto de posesión
- 1977: La viuda negra – Matea Gutiérrez
- 1977: María, la santa
- 1977: The Rhinemann Exchange – Anna
- 1978: Casa de citas
- 1978: The Loving Ones
- 1978: Oro rojo
- 1979: Midnight Dolls
- 1979: The Streets of L.A. – Anita Zamora
- 1980: El hombre de los hongos – Elvira
- 1980: Las tentadoras
- 1980: Navajeros – Mercedes
- 1981: El macho bionico
- 1981: The Pulque Tavern
- 1981: Las mujeres de Jeremías – Tamara Sanchez
- 1981: Las siete cucas
- 1982: Barbarosa – Josephina
- 1982: Una gallina muy ponedora
- 1983: El amor es un juego extraño
- 1983: Appearances Are Deceptive – Adriana / Adrian
- 1983: The Greatest American Hero – Serena Delvera
- 1984: Las glorias del gran Púas
- 1984: Rituals – Maria
- 1984: San Judas de la Frontera
- 1984: The Yellow Rose – Juanita Diaz
- 1985: El secuestro de Lola
- 1985: Nana
- 1986: Dos chichimecas en Hollywood
- 1986: Gringo mojado – Mona Mur
- 1986: Los Amantes del Señor de la Noche – Amparo
- 1986: Stingray – Isabel Rodriguez
- 1987: The Alamo: Thirteen Days to Glory – Senora Cos
- 1988: Blood Screams
- 1989: Las borrachas
- 1989: Salvajes
- 1990: Discriminación maldita
- 1990: El reportero
- 1992: En legítima defensa
- 1995: Manhattan Merengue! – Alfidia
- 1995: Señora Tentación – Tamara
- 1996: Los padres de hoy y del mañana – Hostess (10 episodes, 1996)
- 1997: Conan the Adventurer – Hag
- 1997: Gente bien – Mercedes
- 1999: La ley de Herodes – Doña Lupe
- 2000: Ramona – Matea (unknown episodes)
- 2003: Amor descarado – Nora
- 2004: Killer Snake – Lupe
- 2004: Puños rosas – La Güera
- 2006: Cobrador: In God We Trust – La Gitana
- 2006: Fuera del cielo
- 2006: Mujer alabastrina
- 2007: Pasión – La Paisana
- 2008: Arráncame la vida – Gitana
- 2008: Conozca la cabeza de Juan Pérez – Adivina
- 2008: Crepúsculo rojo – Locha
- 2008: Mujeres asesinas – Margarita Rascón
- 2008: Terminales – Emma Díaz (13 episodes, 2008)
- 2009: Amar – Concha
- 2009: Crónicas chilangas – Anita
- 2009: El muro de al lado – Juana
- 2009: El Pantera
- 2009: Salvando al soldado Pérez
- 2010: El Infierno - Doña Rosaura
- 2010: Niña de mi corazón – Belén
- 2014: Muchacha italiana viene a casarse – Doña Eloísa Ángeles.
- 2014: The Hours with You – Abu
- 2016: Como dice el dicho – Paloma
- 2017: Sin tu mirada – Dominga
- 2017: Érase una vez – Águenda (Episode: "Hansel y Gretel")
- 2018: Like – Eduarda
- 2019: Dora and the Lost City of Gold – Old Woman
- 2020: Cindy la Regia – Mercedes
- 2020: La casa de las flores – Victoria Aguirre

=== As writer, director, producer ===
- 1980: Navajeros (producer)
- 1982: Una gallina muy ponedora (producer)
- 1986: Los amantes del señor de la noche (writer, producer, director)
- 2018–2019: Like La Leyenda

== Discography ==
- Para Mi Departamento (Peerless, 1969)
