= Carmen Salinas =

Mexican actress and politician (1939–2021)

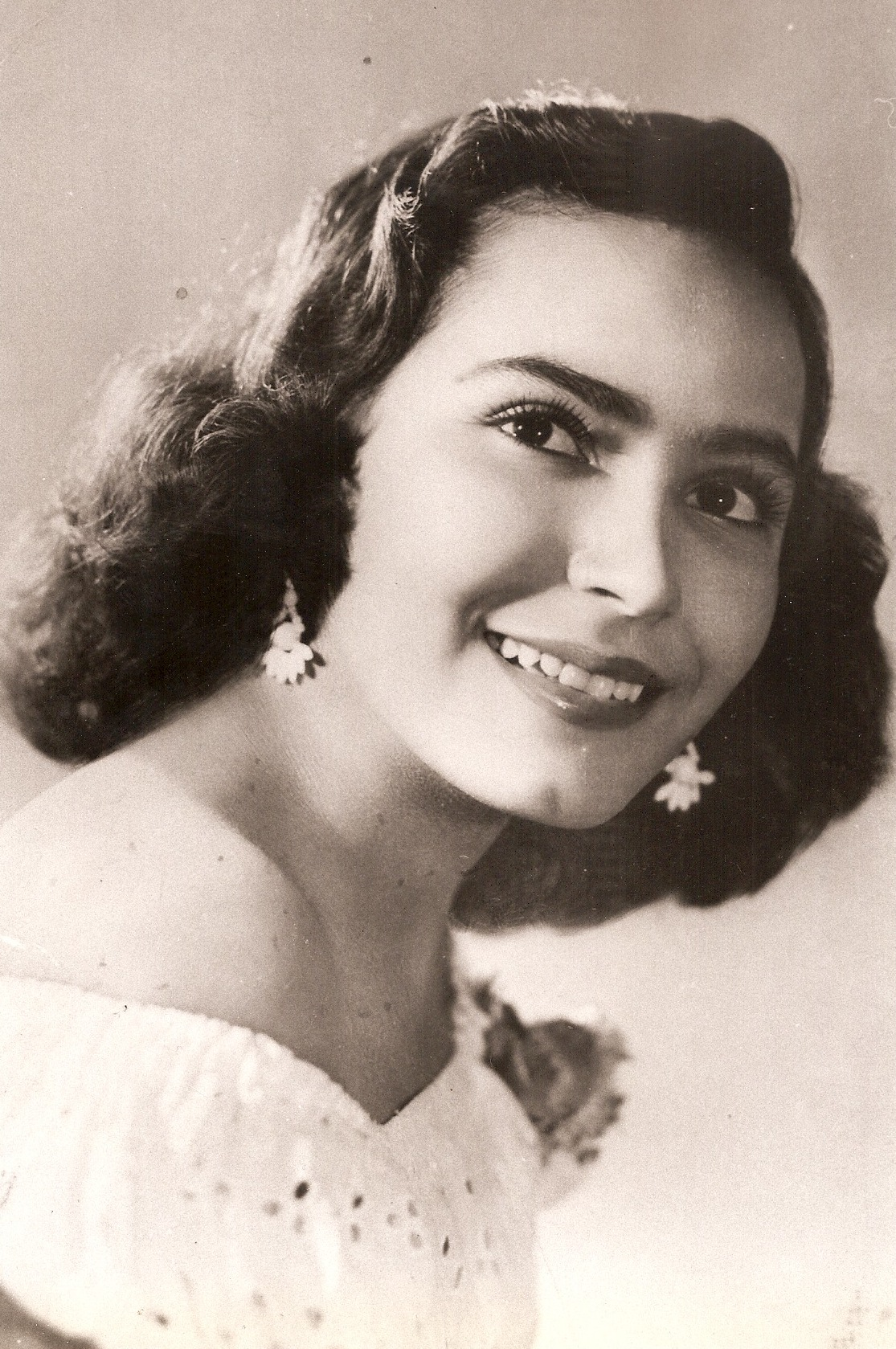
- Salinas, c. 1956
- Born: Carmen Salinas Lozano; 5 October 1939; Torreón, Coahuila, Mexico
- Died: 9 December 2021 (aged 82); Cuauhtémoc, Mexico City, Mexico
- Burial place: Panteón Español, Mexico City
- Occupations: Actress; PRI federal legislator
- Years active: 1954–2021
- Political party: Institutional Revolutionary Party
- Spouse: Pedro Plascencia Ramírez (m. 1956; div. 1979)
- Children: 2
- Parent(s): Jorge Perez Tejada Salinas; Carmen Lozano Viramontes

Member of the Chamber of Deputies
- In office 1 September 2015 – 31 August 2018
- Constituency: Proportional representation

Carmen Salinas Lozano (5 October 1939 – 9 December 2021) was a Mexican actress, impressionist, comedian, politician, and theatre entrepreneur. She was associated with the Institutional Revolutionary Party (PRI) during her later career as a politician.

She appeared in 115 films, 70 theater works, 23 telenovelas, and 9 television series.

== Life ==
Salinas was born in 1939, the daughter of Jorge Perez Tejada Salinas and Carmen Lozano Viramontes. She made her television debut in 1964 under the direction of Ernesto Alonso, appearing in such shows as La vecindad (The Neighborhood), La frontera (The Border) and El chofer (The Chauffeur). She also appeared in plays, more than 110 movies, and 30 plus television shows,. She worked alongside actors and producers including Denzel Washington (in Man on Fire) and Juan Osorio. Salinas' other successful projects included her touring musical Aventurera.

In 1956, Salinas and Pedro Plascencia had a son, Pedro Plascencia Salinas. He composed music, including notable compositions for the Necaxa soccer club, and for Televisa's newscasts Noticias ECO and 24 Horas. Plascencia Salinas died of cancer on 19 April 1994.

On 11 November 2021, Salinas suffered a cerebral hemorrhage, brought upon by hypertension, which caused her to lapse into a coma. Salinas never regained consciousness and died on 9 December 2021, at the age of 82 in Mexico City.

== Political and legislative career ==
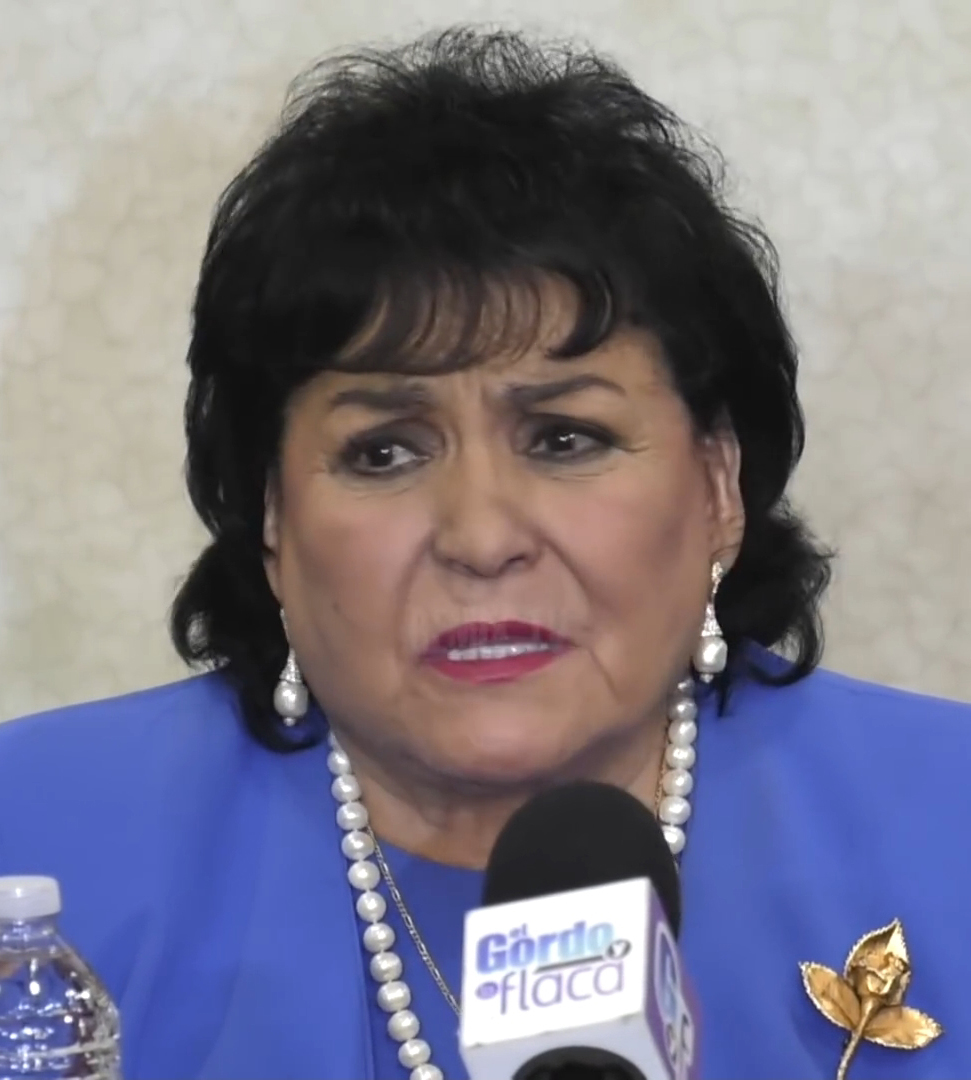
Salinas in 2017

In an interview conducted with El Universal in March 2015, Salinas declared that she "had been a priísta ever since [she] had the use of reason".

In 2015, the PRI placed Salinas on its proportional representation list for election from the fourth electoral region, winning her a seat in the Chamber of Deputies for the LXIII Legislature of the Mexican Congress; Salinas served on the Gender Equality, Radio and Television, and Health Commissions. Salinas, who only completed primary school, had the lowest educational level of all the deputies in the legislature.

== Filmography ==
=== Film ===
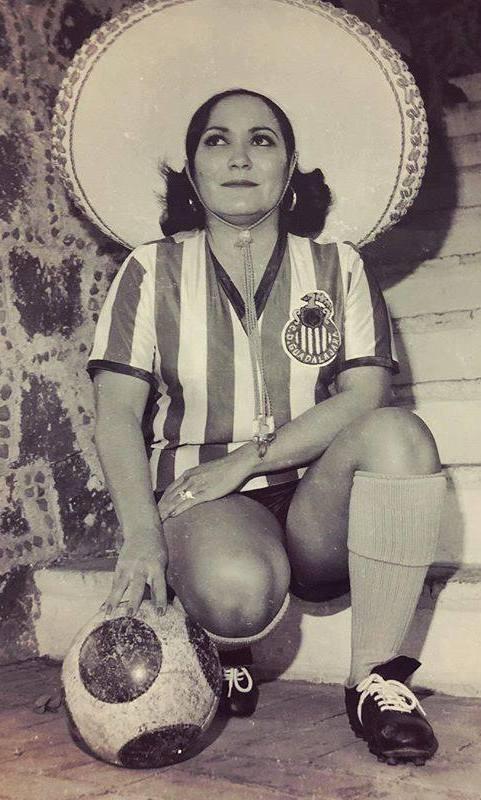
Salinas, c. 1960s

Year	Title	Role	Notes
1967	La vida inútil de Pito Pérez		Debut film
1972	Doña Macabra	Lucila	
1972	El rincón de las vírgenes	Pancha Fregoso	
1973	El diablo en persona	Benedita	
1974	Calzonzin inspector	Doña Eme	
1974	Tívoli	Chapas	
1975	Bellas de noche	La Corcholata	
1975	Las fuerzas vivas	Doña Hortensia	
1975	Albures mexicanos		
1976	La palomilla al rescate	Benedita	
1977	Las cenizas del diputado	Dorotea	
1977	Las ficheras: Bellas de noche II parte	La Corcholata	
1978	El lugar sin límites	Lucy	
1978	Carnival Nights		
1978	Tarjeta verde		
1979	Ratero	Llorona	
1979	The Loving Ones		
1979	Midnight Dolls		
1979	El secuestro de los cien millones		
1980	A paso de cojo	Llorona	
1980	Las tentadoras		
1981	El sexo sentido	Tía Lupe	
1981	Que viva Tepito!	Concha	
1981	El testamento	Doña Cleo	
1981	The Pulque Tavern		
1981	D.F./Distrito Federal		
1981	Las noches del Blanquita		
1982	El rey de los albures		
1982	La pulquería 2		
1982	Las pobres ilegales	Petra	
1984	Las Glorias del Gran Puas		
2004	Man on Fire	Guardian Three	
2007	La misma luna	Doña Carmen	
2011	La otra familia	Doña Chuy	
2011	¿Alguien ha visto a Lupita?	Chespita	
2014	The Popcorn Chronicles	Herself	
2019	Ruta Madre	Doña Ceci	
2022	The Valet	Cecilia	Posthumous release and last role

=== Television ===
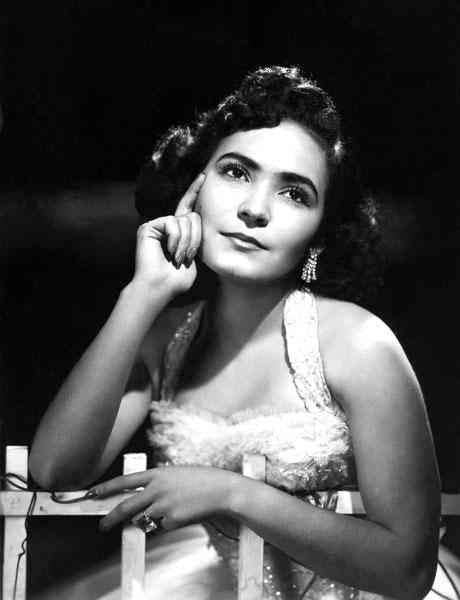
Salinas, c. 1956

Year	Title	Role	Notes
1964	Casa de vecinidad		Television debut
1966	La razón de vivir		
1967	Frontera	Pancha Fregoso	
1970	La sonrisa del diablo	Benedita	
1971	Sublime redención	Doña Eme	
1977	Variedades de media noche	Comedian	6 episodes
1979	Elisa		
1989	La hora marcada	Ella	Episode: "El último metro"
1990–1997	Mujer, casos de la vida real		2 episodes
1992–1993	María Mercedes	Filogonia	
1995–1996	María la del Barrio	Agripina	
1996	La antorcha encendida	Camila de Foncerrada	
1997–1998	Mi pequeña traviesa	Doña Mati	
1998	Preciosa	Doña Pachis	
1999–2000	Hasta en las mejores familias	Herself	Host
2000–2001	Abrázame muy fuerte	Celia Ramos	
2002	Entre el amor y el odio	Chelo	
2003–2004	Velo de novia	Malvina Gonzáles	
2005–2006	Los perplejos	Corcholata	
2006–2007	Mundo de fieras	Candelaria de Barrios	
2009	Adictos	Sofía	6 episodes
2009	Mujeres asesinas	Carmen Jiménez	Episode: "Carmen, honrada"
2009	Los simuladores	Lupe González	"Fin de semana" (Season 2, Episode 15)
2009–2010	Hasta que el dinero nos separe	Arcadia Alcalá	
2010–2011	Triunfo del amor	Milagros Robles Vda. de Martínez	
2012	La familia P. Luche	Herself	1 episode
2012–2013	Porque el amor manda	Luisa "Chatita" Herrera	
2014–2015	Mi corazón es tuyo	Yolanda de Castro	
2016	Sueño de amor	Margarita Manzanares	
2016-2020	Nosotros los guapos	Refugio Encarnación Flores "Doña Cuca"	
2018–2019	Mi marido tiene más familia	Doña Crisanta Díaz	
2021	Mi fortuna es amarte	Margarita "Magos" Domínguez Negrete	

== Awards and nominations ==
Year	Award	Category	Telenovela	Result
1993	TVyNovelas Awards	Best Co-star Actress	María Mercedes	Won
1996	TVyNovelas Awards	Best Co-star Actress	María la del Barrio	Nominated
1999	TVyNovelas Awards	Best Co-star Actress	Preciosa	Won
2001	TVyNovelas Awards	Best Co-star Actress	Abrázame Muy Fuerte	Nominated
2002	TVyNovelas Awards	Best Co-star Actress	Entre el Amor y el Odio	Nominated
2002	TVyNovelas Awards	Special Award for Artistic Career		Won
2003	TVyNovelas Awards	Special Award: 50 Years as Actress		Won
2010	TVyNovelas Awards	Best First Actress	Hasta que el dinero nos separe	Nominated
2012	TVyNovelas Awards	Best First Actress	Triunfo del amor	Nominated
2013	TVyNovelas Awards	Special Lifetime Achievement Award		Won
2008	Premios Diosas de Plata	Female in a Minor Role	La misma luna	Won
