= Jorge Rivero =

Mexican actor

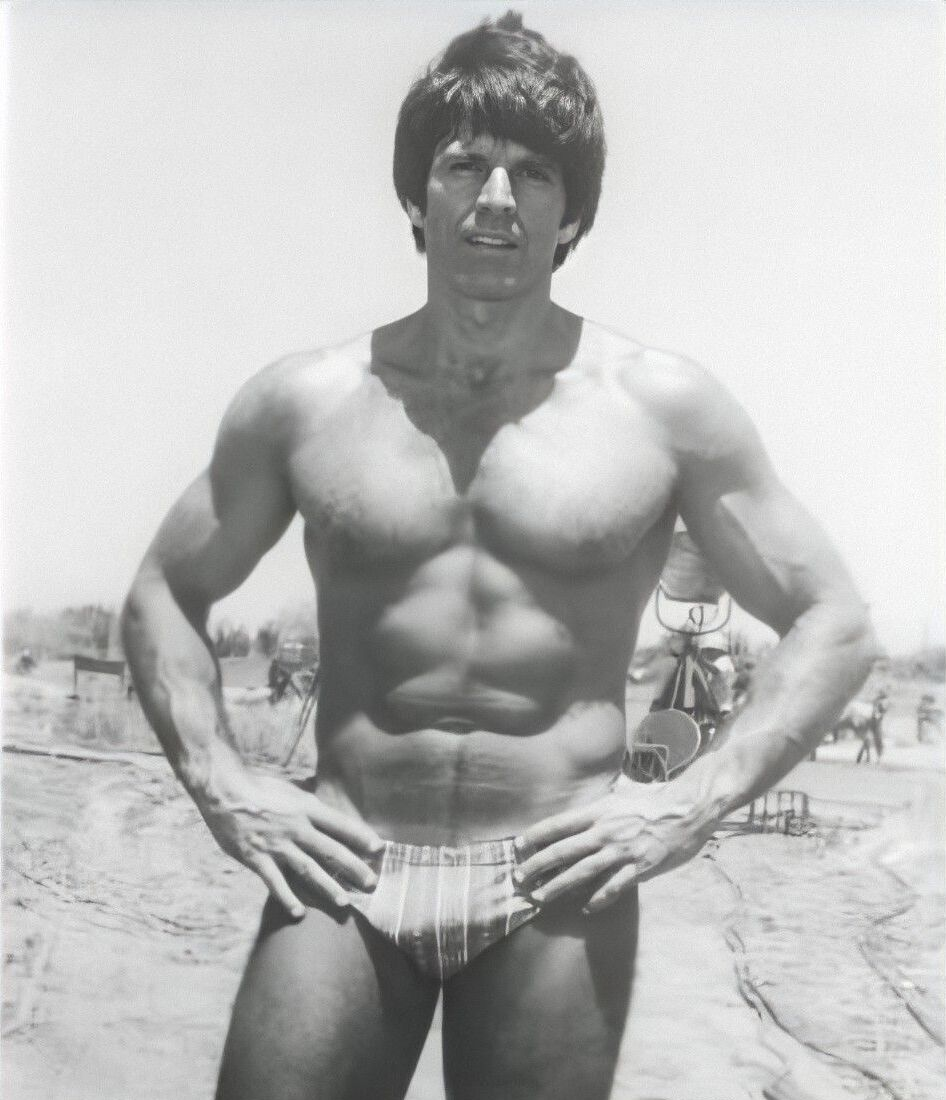
- Rivero in 1975
- Born: José Jorge Jaime Ribe Pous Rosas; June 15, 1938 (age 88); Guadalajara, Jalisco, Mexico
- Other names: George Rivers; George Rivero
- Education: National Autonomous University of Mexico
- Occupation: Actor
- Years active: 1965–present

José Jorge Jaime Ribe Pous Rosas (born June 15, 1938), known professionally as Jorge Rivero, is a Mexican actor. He emerged to stardom in the late 1960s as a leading man and a male sex symbol. He has worked variously in Mexico, the United States, and Europe, in over 100 productions from 1965 to 2014.

== Early life ==
Rivero was born in Guadalajara and raised in Mexico City and proved to be an excellent athlete, excelling in track, jai alai, and water polo. At an early age, he became a bodybuilder and has used weightlifting to maintain his physique throughout his life.

In 1960, he graduated from National Autonomous University of Mexico with a degree in chemical engineering, and then he became an actor.

== Career ==
For Rivero's first film, he was cast in René Cardona's movie The Invisible Assassin (1965) where he wears a mask throughout the film. His breakthrough role came in El Mexicano (1966; directed by René Cardona), making him a star overnight in Mexico. This movie was followed by Pistoleros de la frontera (1967). He appeared in wrestling films with Santo in Operación 67 (1967) and El Tesoro de Moctezuma (1968).

Rivero's most notorious role came in The Sin of Adam and Eve (El pecado de Adán y Eva) (1969), in which Rivero and American costar Candy Wilson appear nude throughout most of the film. By 1970, Rivero had offers from Hollywood and acted in the big-budget films Soldier Blue (1970; with Candice Bergen and Donald Pleasence), Rio Lobo (1970; with John Wayne and Jennifer O'Neill) and The Last Hard Men (1976; with Charlton Heston and James Coburn). In 1976, he also had a role in the Columbo episode "A Matter of Honor". Afterward, Rivero continued to act in Mexican, Italian and U.S. productions, including appearances in Lucio Fulci's 1983 fantasy film Conquest and the all-star action film Counterforce in 1988. In 1996, Rivero acted in the film Werewolf with Richard Lynch and Joe Estevez.

In 2014, after a decade in retirement, Rivero returned to acting in the film The Popcorn Chronicles.

== Personal life ==
Rivero has been married twice, first to Irene Hammer and later to Betty Kramer. He resides in Los Angeles.

== Selected filmography ==
- Neutron Traps the Invisible Killers (1965)
- Pedro Páramo (1967)
- Operation 67 (1967)
- The Sin of Adam and Eve (1969)
- La hermana dinamita (1969)
- Soldier Blue (1970)
- Rio Lobo (1970)
- Bellas de noche (1975)
- The Last Hard Men (1976)
- Confesiones de una adolescente
- Centennial (TV, 1978)
- Carnival Nights (1978)
- Manaos (1979)
- Midnight Dolls (1979)
- Day of the Assassin (1979)
- The Loving Ones (1979)
- The Pulque Tavern (1981)
- Priest of Love (1981)
- Hit Man (1982)
- Fist Fighter (1989)
- The Popcorn Chronicles (2014)
- Conquest (1983)
- Goma-2 (1984)
- Killing Machine (1984)
- Counterforce (1988)
- Werewolf (1996)
