= Luis de Alba =

Mexican comedian

Luis Alba Garcia
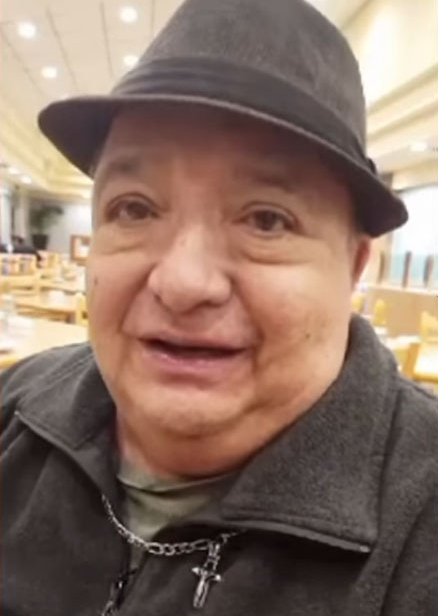
- Garcia in 2017
- Born: March 7, 1945 (age 80); Veracruz, Mexico
- Occupation: Actor
- Years active: 1976-2025

Luis Alba Garcia (born March 7, 1945) is a Mexican comedian. Known for his character El Pirrurris. Garcia created other characters such as "El Raton Crispin" (Crispin The Mouse), who is displayed as a big rat from Veracruz. His typical line was, "Te odio con odio Jarocho", when translated in English, means, "I hate you with hatred Jarocho", as well as "El Indio Maclovio" and "Juan Penas".

His most famous TV program was El Mundo De Luis de Alba, (The World Of Luis de Alba), where El Pirrurris and other characters regularly appeared. After this program was canceled he spent many years away from television but retransmissions of the show were popular. In 2004 he came back portraying the Pirrurris once again in one of Jorge Ortiz de Pinedo's adult-oriented comedy shows, set in a primary school where the students are played by adult actors. In 2005 he got a new show where he plays the Pirrurris as well as his other characters. He is currently appearing in a show called "Los Chuperamigos" in Estrella TV with other actors such as "La Chupitos".

== Characters ==
=== El Pirrurris ===
Created sometime in the 1970s, the character is a very rich young man with a haircut similar to that used by the Beatles in their early years and depicts sarcastically and exaggeratedly the stereotype of a "fresa". He enjoys deprecating low to middle-class people with illusions of grandeur, airs of importance, bad taste, and colorful (low class) slang, while at the same time emphasizing his own importance and class-superiority, using a lot of "high class" slang. The people he deprecates are pejoratively called nacos. Pirrurris refined the ridicule of nacos into nacology, the study of the naco. Sitting behind a desk, he would explain the naco to his audience in scientific terms.

He frequently refers to his millionaire "Papi" and expresses amazement at the most mundane problems faced by normal people. He explains that his name comes from the mathematical constant pi and rorro (Spanish slang for handsome), in that he is "3.1416 times handsome".

Pirrurris has become a common Mexican epithet for someone who looks down on others, is a materialist and superficial, however unknowingly non-intelligent and air-headed, and act as if one were above one's real economic station. Mexican leftist politician Andrés Manuel López Obrador has used the term on different occasions to refer to his right-wing political opponents.

Luis de Alba started his artistic life when he was a child playing a character named "Solin". Solin was the always companion of a supposed man with gifted powers (Kaliman). Kaliman was the name of a daytime radio drama transmitted to audiences exclusively by radio in the 1950s, 1960s, 1970s, and 1980s.

== Selected filmography ==
- Carnival Nights (1978)
- The Loving Ones (1979)
