= Lucía Gálvez =

Argentine historian (1942–2023)

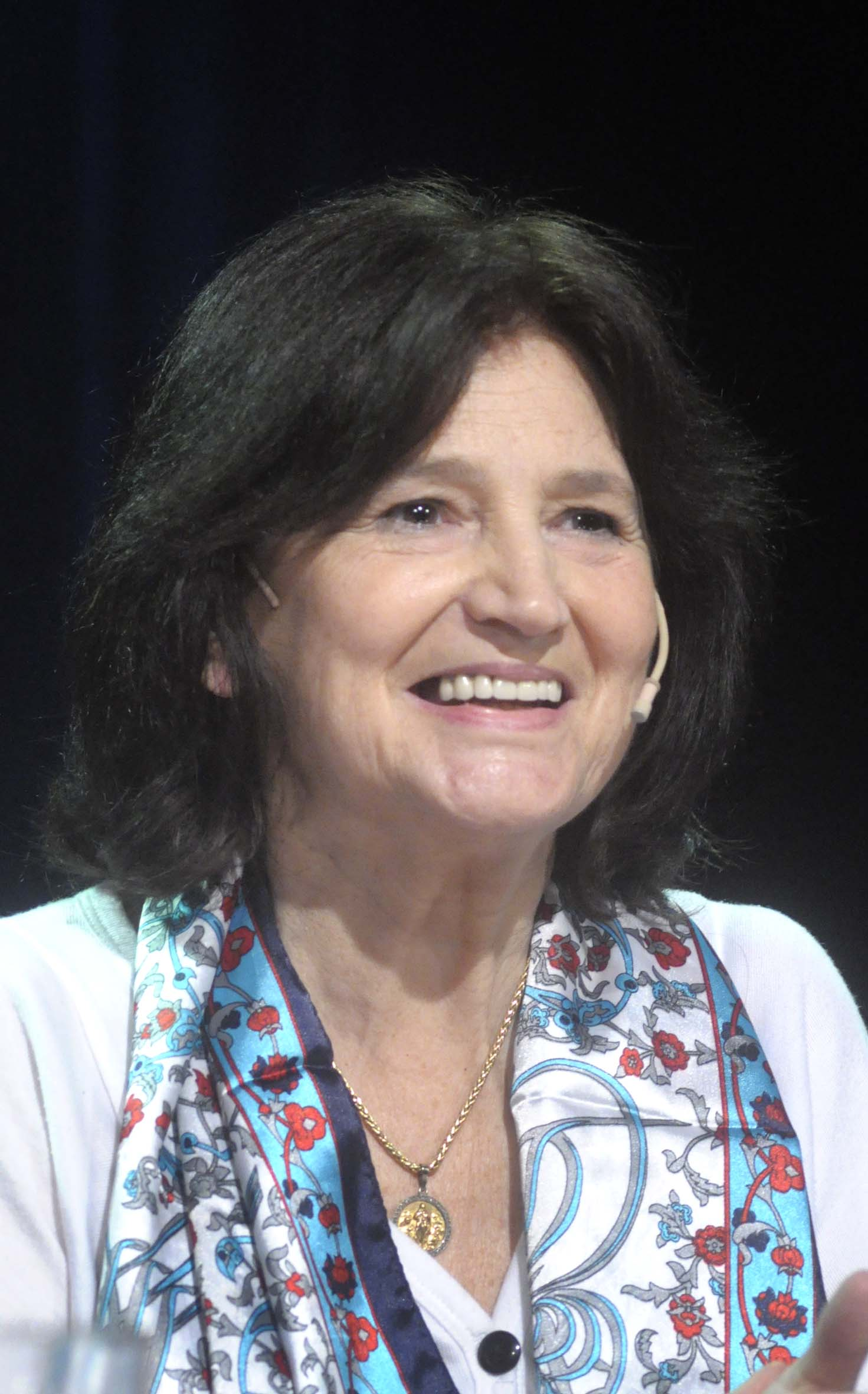

Lucia Galvez (1942–2023) was an Argentine historian. She was born in 1942, the granddaughter of the writers Manuel Gálvez and Delfina Bunge. She studied history at the University of Buenos Aires. She became a professional historian and published titles such as:

- Mujeres de la conquista.
- Historias de amor de la historia Argentina,
- Las mujeres y la patria
- Delfina Bunge. Diarios íntimos de una época brillante.

She died in 2023.
