= Rafael Inclán =

Mexican actor

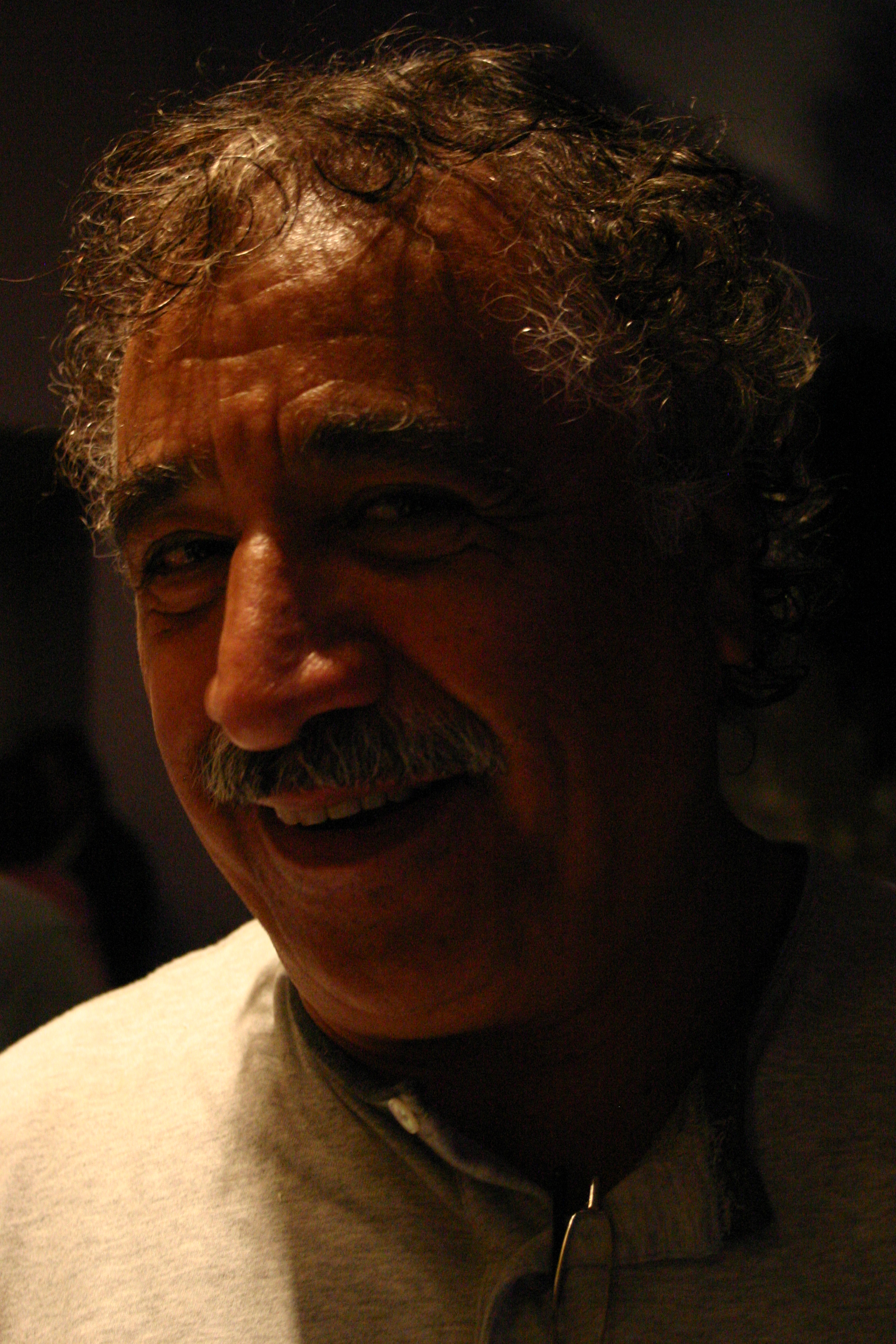
- Inclán in 2007
- Born: Rafael Jiménez Inclán; February 22, 1941 (age 85); Mérida, Yucatán, Mexico
- Occupation: Actor
- Years active: 1969–present

Rafael Jiménez Inclán (born February 22, 1941) is a Mexican actor. He has starred in movies (several of them of which are so-called ficheras), telenovelas (Spanish soap operas), and stage works. His career began in 1969. He is actor Alfonso Zayas Inclán's cousin.

Inclán was born in Mérida, Yucatán, Mexico.

== Selected filmography ==
- Carnival Nights (1978)
- The Loving Ones (1979)
- Midnight Dolls (1979)
- The Pulque Tavern (1981)
- Bienvenido Paisano (2006) - Epifanio López

=== Television ===
- Vivir un poco (1985) - Filogonio Llanos del Toro "Marabunta"
- Rosa salvaje (1987) - Inspector de Policía
- Simplemente María (1989-1990) - Don Chema
- En carne propia (1990) - N/A
- La pícara soñadora (1991) - Camilo López
- Mi querida Isabel (1996-1997) - Pantaleón
- Mi pequeña traviesa (1997-1998) - Marcello
- Camila (1998-1999) - Productor discográfico Luis Lavalle
- DKDA: Sueños de juventud (1999-2000) - Taxista
- Cuento de Navidad (1999-2000) - Don Chente
- Ramona (2000) - Juan Canito
- Amigas y rivales (2001) - Moncho/Manuel de la Colina/Jacaranda
- La escuelita VIP - Rafael Inclan (Vivi)
- Clase 406 (2002-2003) - Ezequiel Cuervo
- Rebelde (2005) - Guillermo Arregui
- Código Postal (2006) - Avelino Gutiérrez
- Pasión (2007) - Pirata
- Alma de hierro (2008-2009) - Don Ignacio Hierro González
- Atrévete a soñar (2009-2010) - Tamir
- Niña de mi corazón (2010) - Vittorio Conti
- Cachito de cielo (2012) - Ernesto Landeros "Pupi"
- Mi corazón es tuyo (2014) - Nicolás Lascuráin
- Mi marido tiene familia (2017) - Eugenio Córcega
- ¿Qué le pasa a mi familia? (2021) - Fulgencio Morales Yela
- ¡Chócalas Compayito! (2023) - Antonio
- Los hilos del pasado (2025) - Benjamín
