= Sasha Montenegro =

Mexican actress (1946–2024)

- Born: Aleksandra Aćimović Popović; 20 January 1946; Bari, Italy
- Died: 14 February 2024 (aged 78); Cuernavaca, Mexico
- Occupations: Film and television actress
- Spouse: José López Portillo (m. 1991; died 2004)
- Children: 2

Sasha Montenegro (Spanish pronunciation: [ˈsaʃa monteˈneɣɾo]), born Aleksandra Aćimović Popović (Cyrillic: Александра Аћимовић Поповић; 20 January 1946 – 14 February 2024), was a Mexican actress and vedette of Montenegrin Serb descent.

Her stage name is derived from a common Serbo-Croatian diminutive for the name Aleksandra ("Sasha") combined with the Spanish name of her country of origin, which is also a surname ("Montenegro").

She was married to José López Portillo, President of Mexico from 1991 to 2004.

== Early life and career ==
Montenegro was born in Bari, Kingdom of Italy, on 20 January 1946, to Yugoslav parents Silvija Popović and Živojin Aćimović. Her mother belonged to an aristocratic family from Montenegro, many members of which reportedly died in death camps during the Nazi occupation of Yugoslavia. Her father worked for the British Intelligence Service.

Her remaining family moved to Argentina, where she was raised. She later relocated to Mexico as an adult, becoming an actress and making several lucha libre movies with superstar El Santo. Starting in the mid-1970s and through the late 1980s, she obtained roles in several Mexican sex comedies.

== Personal life ==
In the 1984, Montenegro began a relationship with the former President of Mexico, José López Portillo, who was still married to Carmen Romano, with whom he had three children. In 1991, López Portillo obtained a divorce from Romano and he and Montenegro were married in a civil ceremony later that year.

Montenegro and López Portillo had two children, Nabila (born 1985) and Alejandro (born 1987).

Sasha Montenegro died on 14 February 2024, at the age of 78.

== Awards and nominations ==
| Year | Category | Program | Result |
|---|---|---|---|
| 2003 | TVyNovelas Award for Best Antagonist Actress | Las vías del amor | Won |

== Filmography ==
=== Telenovelas ===
| Year | Title | Character | Note |
|---|---|---|---|
| 1974 | Ana del aire | Dolly | Supporting Role |
| 1975 | Lo imperdonable | Sonia | Supporting Role |
| 1977 | Rina | Marcela | Supporting Role |
| 1979 | Una mujer marcada | Lorena/Loraine Montiel | Protagonist |
| 2002 | Las vías del amor | Catalina Valencia | Main Antagonist |

=== Films ===
- The End of Silence (2005) as El Convento Rica Dancer
- El secuestro de un policía (1991)
- La fuerza del odio (1990)
- La taquera picante (1990) as Ana Dalia
- Ellos trajeron la violencia (1990) as Nora
- Dos tipas de cuidado (1989)
- Rumbera, caliente (1989)
- Sólo para adúlteros (1989)
- El pájaro con suelas (1989)
- Las guerreras del amor (1989)
- Los rateros (1989)
- Los plomeros y las ficheras (1988)
- Dos machos que ladran no muerden (1988)
- Ladrón (1988)
- Solicito marido para engañar (1988) as Virginia
- El Diablo, el santo y el tonto (1987)
- Las traigo muertas (1987)
- Ases del contrabando (1987)
- Niños sobre pedido (1987)
- Noche de Califas (1987)
- Huele a gas (1986)
- Mientras México duerme (1986)
- El hijo de Pedro Navaja (1986) as La Tijuana
- El secuestro de Camarena (1985)
- La risa alarga la vida y algo más (1985)
- Playa prohibida (1985) as Elena
- Entre ficheras anda el diablo - La pulquería 3 (1984)
- Extraño matrimonio (1984)
- Piernas cruzadas (1984)
- El puente (1984)
- Las glorias del gran Púas (1984)
- Pedro Navaja (1984) as La Tijuana
- El tonto que hacía milagros (1984)
- Fieras en brama (1983)
- Se me sale cuando me río (1983)
- La golfa del barrio (1983)
- Las modelos de desnudos (1983)
- Las vedettes (1983)
- Chile picante (1983)
- Con el cuerpo prestado (1983) as Marta Jiménez de Arias Salgado
- Huevos rancheros (1982)
- La pulquería 2 (1982) as Norma and her Twin
- Llámenme Mike (1982) as Zoila
- The Pulque Tavern (1981) as Norma
- D.F./Distrito Federal (1981)
- Las tentadoras (1980) as Luz María/Lucía
- Blanca Nieves y... sus 7 amantes (1980)
- El sexo me da risa (1979)
- La vida difícil de una mujer fácil (1979)
- The Loving Ones (1979) as Carolina
- Midnight Dolls (1979) as Gina
- Carnival Nights (1978)
- El hijo es mío (1978)
- Los japoneses no esperan (1978)
- Oye Salomé! (1978) as Bettina
- Bellas de noche 2 (1977) as Carmen
- Acapulco 12-22 (1975)
- Bellas de noche (1975) as Carmen
- Noche de muerte (1975)
- Pistoleros de la muerte (1975)
- Un amor extraño (1975)
- Santo en Anónimo mortal (1975) as Ester
- Peregrina (1974) as Alma Reed
- Pistoleros bajo el sol (1974)
- Fe, Esperanza y Caridad (1974) as Ecuyére
- Santo y Blue Demon contra el doctor Frankenstein (1974) as Alicia Robles
- Los vampiros de Coyoacán (1974)
- Duelo al atardecer (1973)
- Las bestias del terror (1973)
- Santo contra la magia negra (1973) as Bellamira
- Santo contra los asesinos de otros mundos (1973) as Karen Bernstein
- El hombre y la bestia (1973)
- Hijazo de mi vidaza (1972)
- Un sueño de amor (1972)
