= Alfonso Zayas =

Mexican actor and comedian (1941–2021)

Juan Alfonso Zayas Inclán (30 June 1941 – 8 July 2021), better known as Alfonso Zayas, was a Mexican actor and comedian. He was best known for his participation in many Mexican sex comedies. In Mexico, Zayas participated in over 100 films. Zayas is remembered better by United States audiences for his participation, since 2000, in the Univision Saturday evenings show, Sabado Gigante.

== Career ==
Zayas' first participation as an actor came when he was cast for a theater play named "Irma la Dulce" ("Sweet Irma"), where he acted alongside Silvia Pinal, Roberto Guzman, Alejandro Suárez and other actors. A few years after, Zayas began acting in TV shows.

His first chance to participate in a movie came in 1950, at the age of 9, in a movie named "Azahares para tu boda" ("Orange Blossom for your Wedding"). Then, at the age of 17, Zayas participated in a film named "Piernas de Oro" ("Legs of Gold").

Zayas' career continued well into the 2010s, including a period in which he, alongside others such as Rafael Inclan, Cesar Bono, Pedro Weber and many other actors of the era, became famous for participating in "ficheras", Mexican comedies with considerable sensual material and sex jokes on them. Among the most famous movies of that genre that Zayas acted on were 1991's "Transplante a la mexicana" ("Transplant, Mexican Style") and "El sexo me divierte" ("Sex Entertains Me"). He also acted on Televisa's TV show, "La criada bien criada" ("The Well Raised Maid". not to be confused with a Puerto Rican television show of a similar name called "La criada mal criada"), alongside legendary Mexican actress Maria Victoria.

During 2000, Zayas began traveling to Miami, Florida, where he participated weekly on a sketch on Chilean show host Don Francisco's Univision television show, Sabado Gigante. Zayas found constant work there and participated for more than one decade in the American show.

== Personal life ==
Zayas was a native of Tulancingo. He had two sons. One, Alfonso Zayas Jr., is also an actor. The other, who was his first son and who worked as a helicopter pilot, died at the age of 44 in a helicopter crash in 2005 in San Luis Potosi. He also had a daughter. His cousin is Rafael Inclan, another well known Mexican actor.

In later life, Zayas was a resident of the Mexican city of Cuernavaca.

== Death ==
Zayas died of respiratory failure on the evening of July 8, 2021 Mexico City. He was buried in Panteón Jardín.

Among the many celebrities who reacted with online messages upon learning of Zayas' death were actors Edgar Vivar (who had worked with Zayas during a filming in Peru) and Luis Manuel Avila, as well as members of the baseball team, Toros de Tijuana.

== See also ==
- List of Mexicans
