= Vanessa Show =

Argentine actress, singer and dancer (1945–2023)

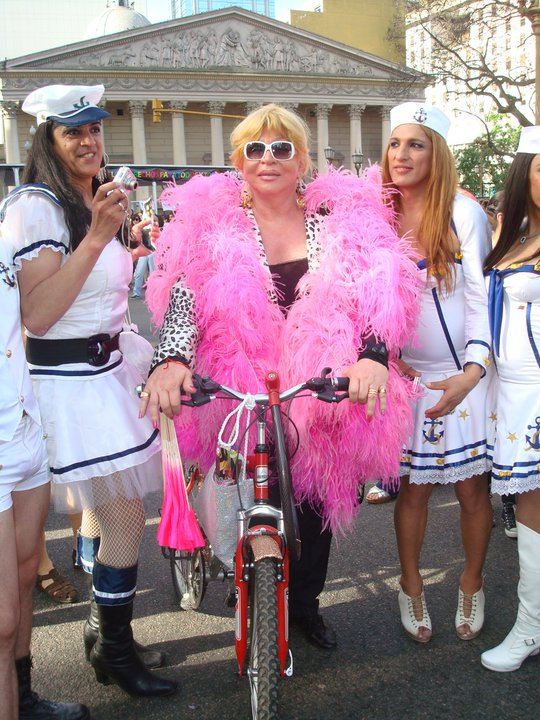
- Vanessa Show at the Buenos Aires pride parade, 2010.
- Born: José Mussi; September 27, 1945; La Banda, Santiago del Estero, Argentina
- Died: September 15, 2023 (aged 77); Buenos Aires, Argentina
- Occupations: Vedette; media personality
- Years active: 1971–2023
- Known for: Being the first travesti entertainer in Argentine showbusiness

Vanessa Show (27 September 1945 – 15 September 2023) was an Argentine travesti performer. As the first travesti in Argentine show business—through the Buenos Aires revue circuit—she is considered a pioneering figure.

== Early life ==
Vanessa Show was born José Mussi in La Banda, a town in Santiago del Estero Province, into an affluent family of cattlemen and slaughterers of Arab origin. When she was twelve, her parents separated and her father disinherited her mother, leaving them penniless. Show moved to Buenos Aires at age fifteen and got low-paying jobs like washing glasses and peeling potatoes at bars.

== Career ==
Show began working as a revista porteña backup male dancer for important vedettes such as Nelida Lobato, Nélida Roca, Susana Brunetti and Moria Casán. She eventually got a job at the El Nacional and Maipo theaters as a male dancer. For a while, she alternated this theatre work with appearances as a vedette in a Bahía Blanca cabaret, eventually choosing to dedicate herself entirely to cross-dressing performing. She told Página/12 in 2018: "I stopped being a male dancer in November 1970 and by December 1971 in the Maracaibo Music-Hall in Mar del Plata, with Jorge Perez Evelyn in the revue “Que Bonito es Mar del Plata”. I was already famous as Vanessa Show." She then dedicated herself to doing shows in small theatres from Buenos Aires and other parts of the country, with titles such as Las vedettes son ellos, Compañía de travestis and Los travestis se divierten. In these shows, she initially appeared dressed in men's clothes, gave a monologue and presented other artists, later appearing as a vedette performing musical numbers, with sophisticated costumes with feathers and glitter. The name Vanessa was given to her by producer Éber Lobato, and the surname Show came after a journalist from Crónica described her as "quite a show" upon seeing her.

In 1974, she was the subject of the short documentary film Vanessa directed by Marie Louise Alemann, which documented the performer backstage as she transformed from master of ceremonies to showgirl. Unreleased for many years, the film was discovered by Federico Windhausen, who was able to identify Vanessa Show with the assistance of the Archivo de la Memoria Trans. The film was screened in 2018 at Asterico, an Argentine LGBT film festival.

In 1975, Show was hired to perform in a cabaret in Italy. While in Europe, she began to transition and live her everyday life with a feminine gender expression. Back in Buenos Aires, she bought an apartment in Congreso, but due to constant harassment from the police and the Triple A—which labelled her a "sex terrorist"—decided to return to Europe.

The entertainer continued to perform through several European countries.

Show was also the main attraction of private presentations at parties of the King of Morocco.

In the 1990s, Show returned to her homeland and resided in Buenos Aires. She was steadily invited to be guest of the talk shows of Argentinian television, and presentations in music halls and magazines interviews. Show was widely known for "no tener pelos en la lengua", a Spanish expression that means "being a blunt person", that only intended to speak very frankly about everything. Her frankly open opinion about the romance that the football player Diego Maradona was having with famed Argentine transsexual Cris Miró was published in an article of Rating Cero.

Show died at the Providencia Hospital in Buenos Aires, on 15 September 2023, at the age of 77.
