= Revista porteña =

Theatrical genre native to Argentina

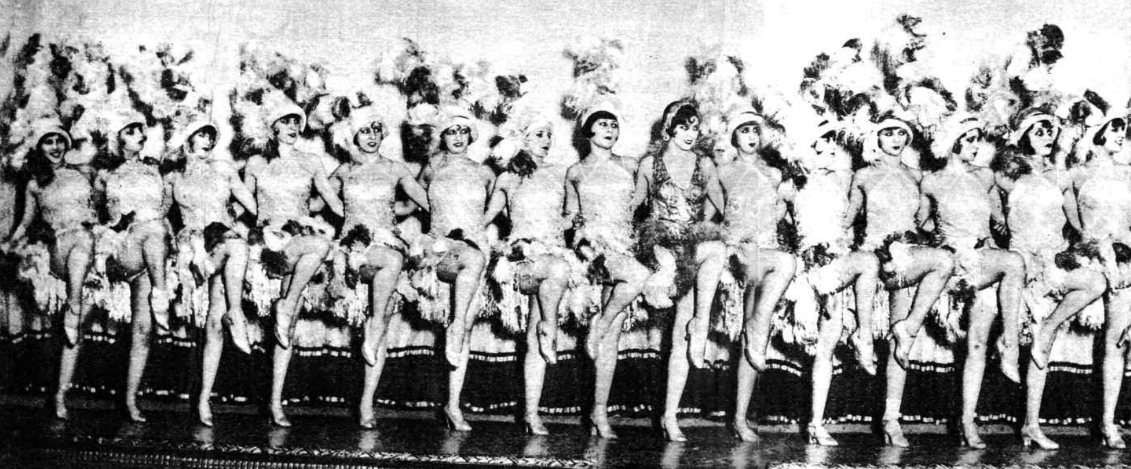
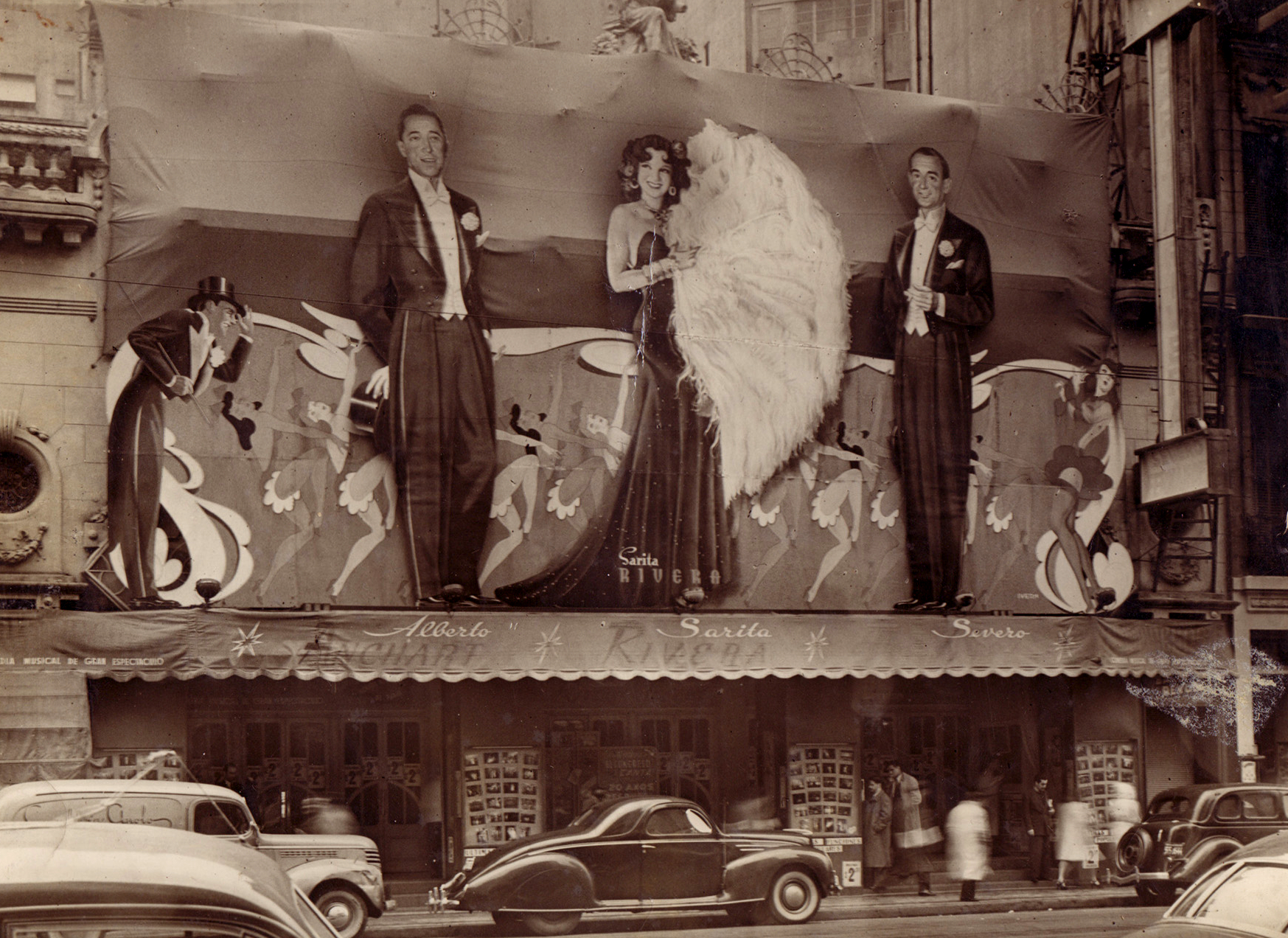
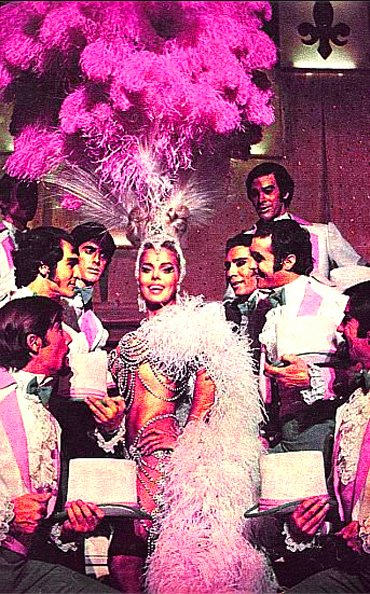
From top, left to right: a musical number from a revue staged at the Maipo theatre in 1925, with Gloria Guzmán, Carmen Lamas, Celia Gámez and Tita Merello among the dancers; a poster for the El Nacional theatre in 1946 featuring the vedette Sarah Rivera and the comedians Alberto Anchart and Severo Fernández; Nélida Lobato as leading vedette in a revue at El Nacional around 1970.

The revista porteña (meaning "porteña revue" or "Buenos Aires revue" in Spanish) is a theatrical genre native to Argentina, derived from European revue, which originated in the city of Buenos Aires and dominated the local theatre circuit—concentrated chiefly on Corrientes Avenue—from its emergence in the 1920s until the beginning of its decline in the second half of the 1970s. The Maipo theatre was the most emblematic venue of the genre, known as the "cathedral of the revista porteña", though the El Nacional, the Tabarís, the Astral and the Cómico theatres were also prominent. Its immediate precursor was the revista criolla (lit. "criolla revue", that is, local revue), which emerged in the late 1890s as a local adaptation of the Spanish-style revue. The transformation of the revista criolla into the revista porteña took place from 1922 onward, when the staging of French revue productions—notably that of Madame Rasimi and her Ba-Ta-Clan company, which caused a great impact on the city's audiences and influenced local theatrical producers. The French productions introduced the revue format with scantily clad vedettes and a production style based on luxury, visual splendour and onstage sensuality, deeply shaping the development of the revista porteña.

Over the following decades, the revista porteña experienced an unprecedented boom, at one point premiering more musical productions than reference theatre cities such as New York. Major local figures emerged—actors, comedians, singers and vedettes—who consolidated a style characterised by the absence of a linear plot, favouring instead a succession of sketches, monologues, musical numbers and lavish choreography. The period between 1940 and 1960 is considered the "Golden Age" of the revista porteña. During those years the genre reached its greatest popularity and consolidated its distinctive stylistic features, although the era was also marked by political censorship, particularly during the dictatorship that followed the 1943 coup and during the Peronist government, which restricted political satire and artistic expression, pushing the revue toward more conservative themes or toward the use of foreign elements. Despite this, the revista porteña retained its vitality and adapted, with figures such as Nélida Roca—nicknamed the "Venus of Corrientes Street"—and theatrical impresarios such as Carlos A. Petit, who drove the production and dissemination of the genre.

In the following decades, the revista porteña faced new challenges: competition from sound cinema, television and other theatrical genres such as the café-concert. In the 1960s and 1970s, although it began to lose popularity, it continued to produce hits and to renew itself with the emergence of new vedettes, including Nélida Lobato and Moria Casán. During this period the revista porteña also opened its doors to sexual diversity, notably including transvestite vedettes such as Vanessa Show, a pioneer of travesti-trans representation in the genre. The social and cultural changes of the late 20th and early 21st centuries, together with economic crisis and the transformation of forms of entertainment, led to a gradual decline of the revista porteña. Today it is considered a genre that has practically disappeared, surviving only sporadically or in transformed forms, influenced by other styles of musical theatre and television comedy. Since 2013 it has been included on the official list of Cultural Heritage of the city, alongside emblems of Buenos Aires culture such as tango or fileteado.

== Characteristics ==
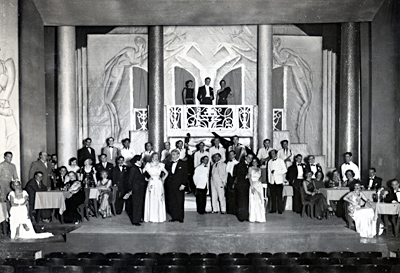
The cast of the revue Cabaret, presented at the Maipo theatre in 1936.

In its classic form, the revista porteña (meaning "porteña revue" or "Buenos Aires revue" in Spanish) is characterised by a predefined structural sequence of segments (called "cuadros", or scenes) based on alternating musical and choreographic numbers interspersed with humorous sketches mainly dealing with political and sexual themes—a pattern that remained constant from roughly 1920 until the genre's decline in the 1970s. The writer Roberto Tálice, a witness to the revista porteña from its earliest period, explained the genre's typical structure in a 1991 interview, describing an opening musical number as a kind of prologue tied to the revue's title, meant to be visually striking while giving little away; this was followed by two short sketches with a handful of performers and an unexpected twist, with brief musical numbers interspersed between them; then came the celebrated monologue, almost always political in tone and considered indispensable to any revue; an elaborate dance number followed, showcasing the vedettes and dancers; shortly before the end came a keenly awaited tango number, usually sung by a woman and always newly composed for the show; and finally the "apotheosis", a spectacular closing number tied to the revue's title in which the whole company paraded before the audience, employing devices such as runways and staircases, with the leading performers taking individual bows.

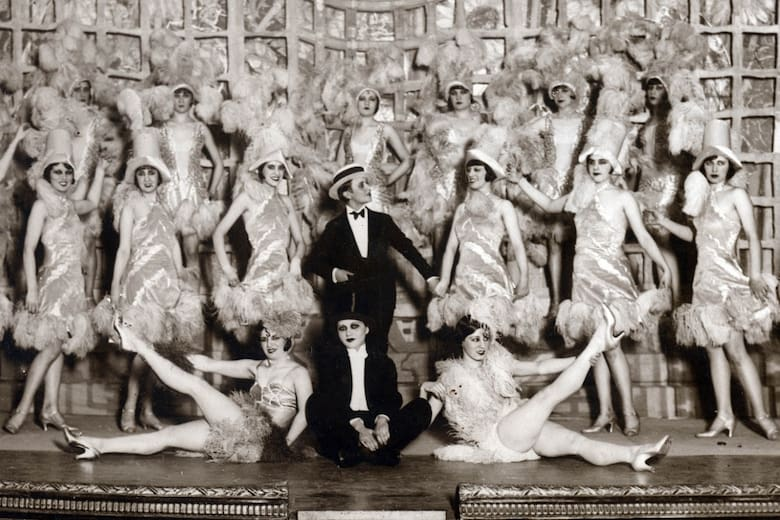
The cast of a revista porteña from the 1920s.

In an article written for the magazine El mundo teatral in 1921, Carlos Román gave a detailed description of the genre's structure that "shows the close relationship and mutual interplay of the verbal and the non-verbal". According to Román, revues of that period typically opened with a prologue in which a character—a poet, a "dirty old man", a vagrant, or, most commonly, a canillita (paperboy)—fell into a dream. The lights would dim, a spotlight would come on, and, after the sound of a cymbal, a trapdoor would open and a fairy would appear—symbolising the revue itself, fantasy, inspiration, magic, life, hope, joy, or even a goddess—who consoled the character by promising an entertaining show. Meanwhile the orchestra played a soft melody in the half-light. After a moment of total darkness, the stage would be fully lit by spotlights and the orchestra would reach its peak volume: the revue was in full swing, with a fantastical set framing a group made up of every woman in the company. The fairy, always positioned to the right, announced the sequence of the following scenes. Typical elements included verse passages meant to stir the audience's patriotism, a large musical number showcasing the company's dance troupe, a monologue by the male comedian, politically satirical scenes (often censored), and musical numbers in foreign styles. The show closed with an apotheosis or ensemble number designed to highlight the female talent on stage.

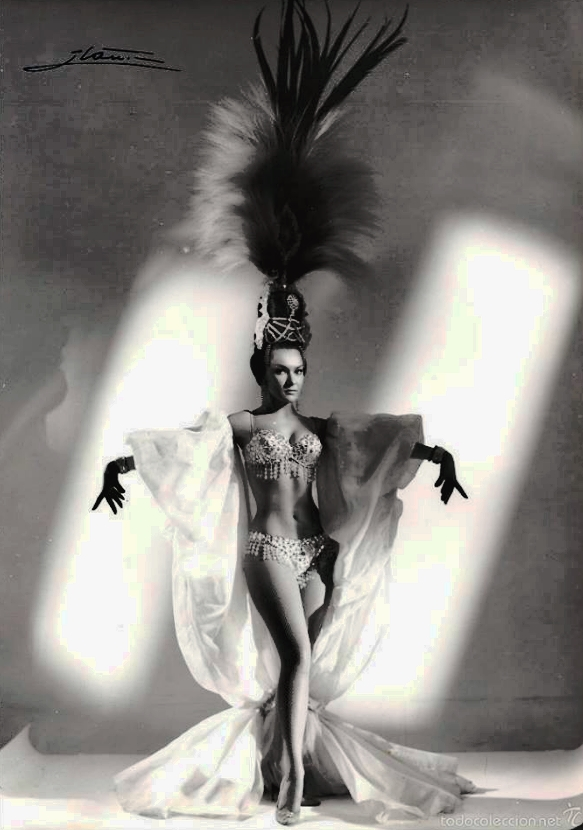
Ethel Rojo, c. 1950s–1960s, wearing a typical vedette costume.

Both the revista porteña, which emerged as such in the 1920s, and its predecessor the revista criolla (lit. "criolla revue", that is, local revue), reflected the effects of urban and technological progress and modernity on Argentine society. From the 1920s onward, elements of French influence defined the new style of the revista porteña, such as the luxury and allure of the vedettes, elaborate staging, local colour and the depiction of exotic settings. To these was added a central element of the revista porteña: the discussion of current events. Urban changes, politics, cinema and football became recurring subjects for many of the sketches. Antonio Botta, a writer for Pepe Arias's revue company, described the revista porteña in 1937 as a form of theatre that resisted fixed rules, functioning instead as a kind of "objectified journalism" in which the flow of unforeseen current events—political, social, or simply anything with satirical potential—gave the writer material to work with. Political caricature, a hallmark of the revista porteña, began to be replaced from the 1943 military government onward, and later during Peronism, by cruder, coarser humour focused mainly on sex. This type of humour dominated the stage even in later years, once censorship had been lifted.

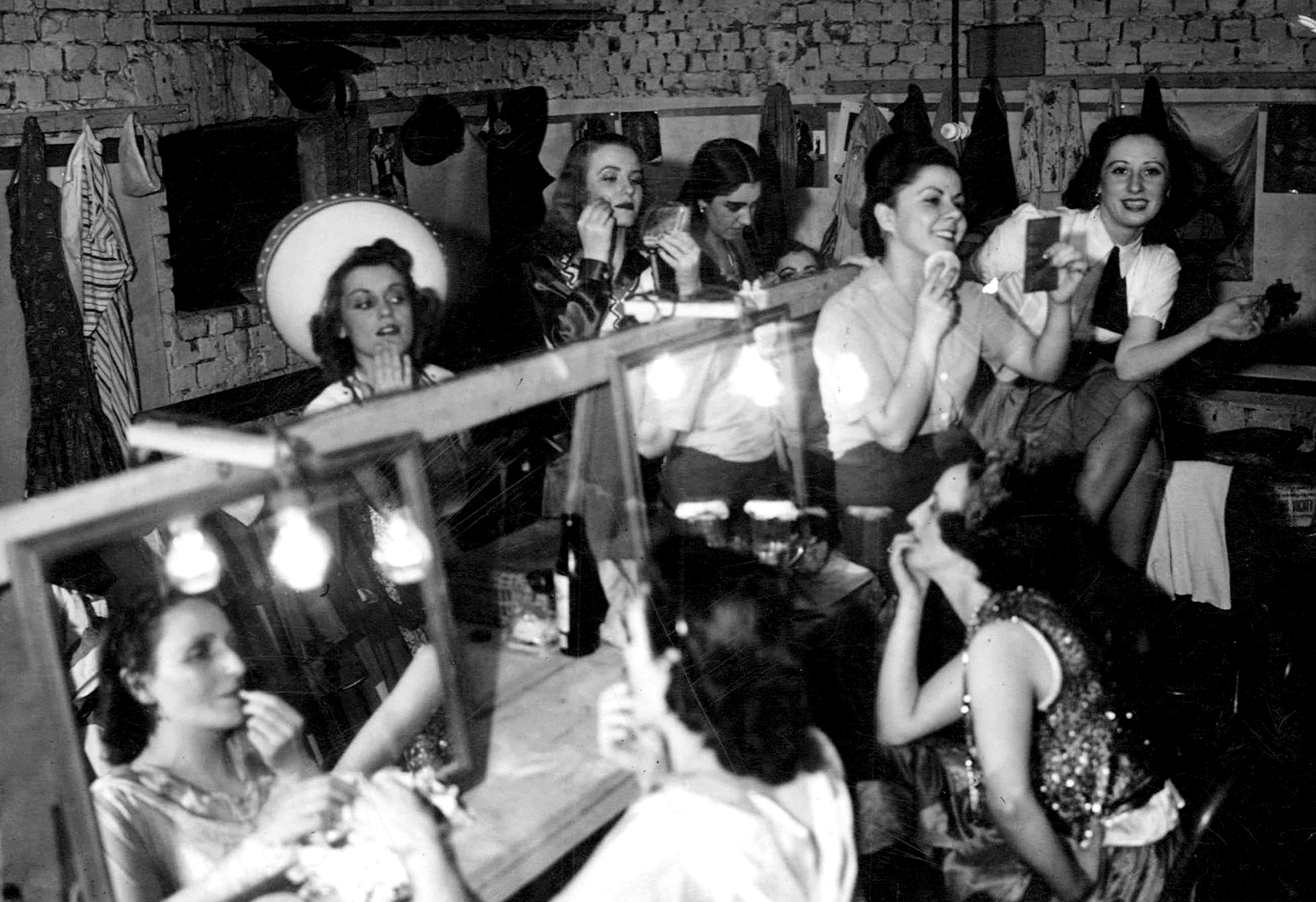
Chorus girls of the Maipo theatre putting on make-up before going on stage in 1939.

A classic feature of the revista porteña was the strict hierarchy within its casts, which determined roles in the show. Moria Casán, who established herself as a vedette in the 1970s, recalled in a 2012 interview the typical structure of the female cast: the chorus girls (coristas), who could show their bare backside; the models (modelos), who only paraded and appeared topless; the dancers (bailarinas), who did not bare their backside but showed off their skill; then the "bluebell girls", who went topless without pasties; then, among the vedettes, the medias vedettes ("half vedettes"), who had a brief appearance in the second vedette's number; the second vedette (segunda vedette), who had her own number and some sketches; and the leading vedette (primera vedette), who had the main number, the main sketch and the finale—a hierarchy she noted no longer existed by 2012. The figure of the male comedian, known as the capocómico, has been described as the "backbone of the revue" and headlined most productions.

A vedette is, among other things, an agreed-upon standard of beauty, a bearing. Charm inhabits the very nature of her role, and her work is the hypnosis produced not by her artistic gifts but by the sheer glow of her presence—the goddess made flesh, right there, a few metres away, so real on the stage. No one requires the vedette to know how to sing, dance, or act. Because a vedette, within the tradition of variety theatre and the deep-rooted history of Argentine revue, need only emerge from her own forge and win over the audience through the blessed fact of her presence.

— Alejandro Seselovsky, 2014

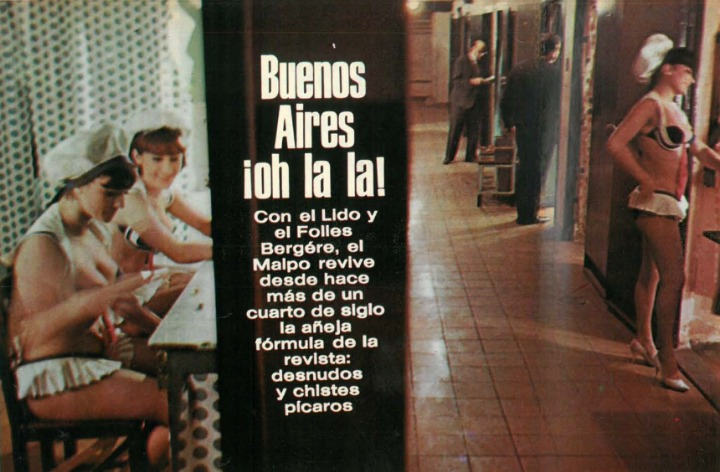
Backstage at a revue at the Maipo, in a 1966 feature by Panorama magazine.

One of the most characteristic and criticised aspects of the revista porteña has been its reproduction of social prejudices about women. Isabel Coello, a vedette at the Maipo, told the magazine Siete Días Ilustrados in a 1967 feature about the harassment she faced from men, who considered the performers dishonest despite the gruelling eight-hour shifts, ten costume changes a night, and low pay. In the same piece, her colleague Tita added that performers were also subject to a strict, prison-like disciplinary regime, with fines for forgetting an earring and reprimands, as if they were schoolgirls, for arriving five minutes late to rehearsal. On the representation of women in the revista porteña, researchers Beatriz Trastoy and Perla Zayas de Lima wrote:

It has often been argued that the revue presents women as an ambivalent sexual object: admired and, at the same time, degraded. Indeed, the female figure's prominence on stage is not limited to pure physical display: she sings, dances and acts. When the female figure attains the rank of leading vedette, she appears as the winner, the one who has competed, triumphed and been chosen among many. This then allows for the degradation and devaluation of the other women in the show, treated as vulgar, ignorant and promiscuous. Confronted, in turn, with the comedian, the vedette is herself degraded, verbally and physically mistreated through insults and groping. She becomes a sexual object that provides pleasure for men and provokes their arousal. This devaluation of the female figure is reinforced by the fetishistic quality of the dazzling costumes displayed on stage.

== History ==
=== 1870–1890: Background and precursors ===
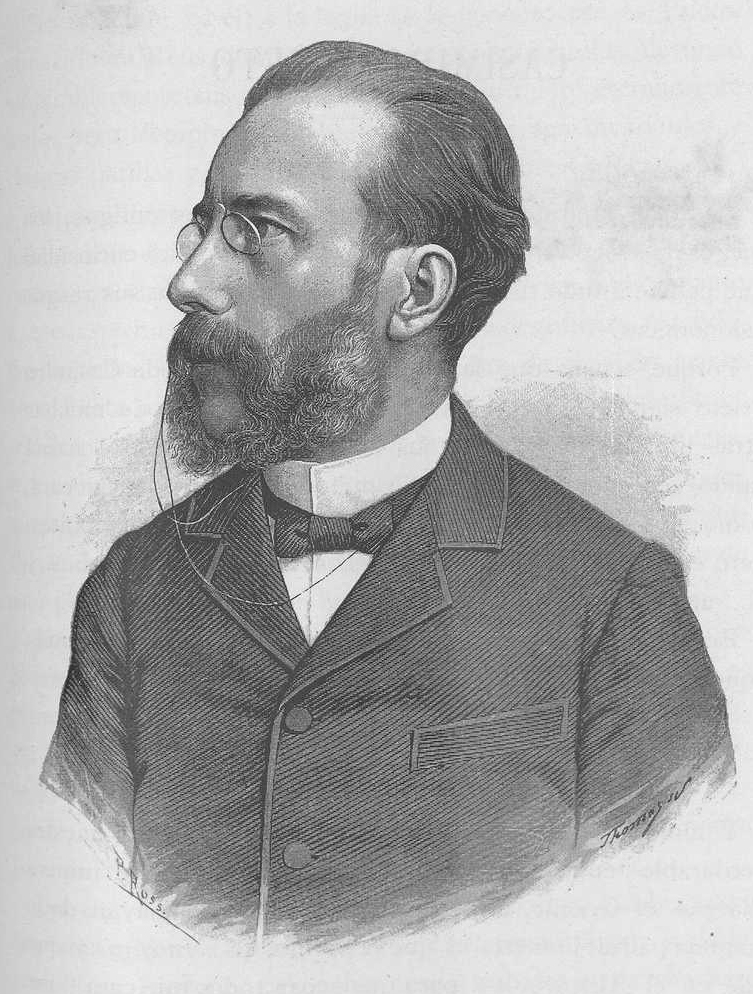
Casimiro Prieto Valdés, portrayed around 1891. His play El sombrero de Don Adolfo, premiered in 1875, has been regarded as the first precursor of Argentine revue.

Unlike other theatrical styles with a tradition in Buenos Aires, the revue is an "immigrant and recent" genre, having reached the city through its French and Spanish variants. The first work to be called a revue was 1841 et 1941 ou aujourd'hui et dans cent ans ("1841–1941, or Today and a Hundred Years From Now"), which premiered in Paris in 1841 and combined elements of the féerie, the café-concert, the music hall, the variété and musical theatre. The term "revue" comes from the French revue, meaning "to review, to see again", which reflected its original purpose: reviewing current political events within a show combining music, dance and, often, a comic sketch of parodic and humorous content. From France, the revue spread to other countries such as England, Germany, Italy, Spain and the United States, where Florenz Ziegfeld immortalised the genre with his Ziegfeld Follies from 1907 onward. In Spain, the revue became associated with the vernacular genres of the sainete and the zarzuela. The first Spanish revue was 1864–1865, though the genre reached full maturity only with La Gran Vía, which premiered in Madrid in 1886 and, a year later, in Buenos Aires, founding with that premiere the tradition of the Spanish revue in the Río de la Plata region.

Political satire, a fundamental element of the later revista criolla and revista porteña, has a long theatrical tradition in Buenos Aires. For example, during the government of Nicolás del Campo, viceroy of the Río de la Plata between 1784 and 1789, the tonadilla (a song used as a theatrical interlude) La tirana was written openly criticising him. Later, the leading performer of political satire during the Argentine independence period was the criolla singer Ana Rodríguez Campomanes, active on the Buenos Aires stage between 1816 and 1839. Following Justo José de Urquiza's pronouncement against governor Juan Manuel de Rosas in 1851, satirical closing sketches against the general flourished, such as El entierro del loco, traidor, salvaje unitario Urquiza, staged that year at the original Teatro Argentino (formerly the Coliseo Provisional).

There are conflicting opinions about the precursors of the revue in Argentina. Scholars of Argentine theatre have repeatedly cited El sombrero de Don Adolfo by Casimiro Prieto Valdés, premiered in 1875, as the first precursor of the revista porteña.

Some theatre critics, such as Edmundo Guibourg, consider Eduardo de Rico and Eduardo García Lalanne's La nueva vía o el estado de un país (1888)—a parody of La Gran Vía—to be the genre's forerunner in Buenos Aires. Several other works have been cited as pioneering, including Un día en la capital and La fiesta de Don Marcos by Nemesio Trejo and Andrés Abad Antón, De paseo por Buenos Aires by Justo López de Gomara and Isabel Obrejón, De paso por aquí, Otra revista and Lo que vale un apellido by Miguel Ocampo and Abad Antón, and El gato electoral by Eduardo Gordon—all premiered around 1890.

The Buenos Aires premiere of La Gran Vía marked the local theatrical system's adoption of the Spanish revue model, which in turn gave rise to a series of revistas criollas.

=== 1890–1920: Beginnings of the revista criolla ===
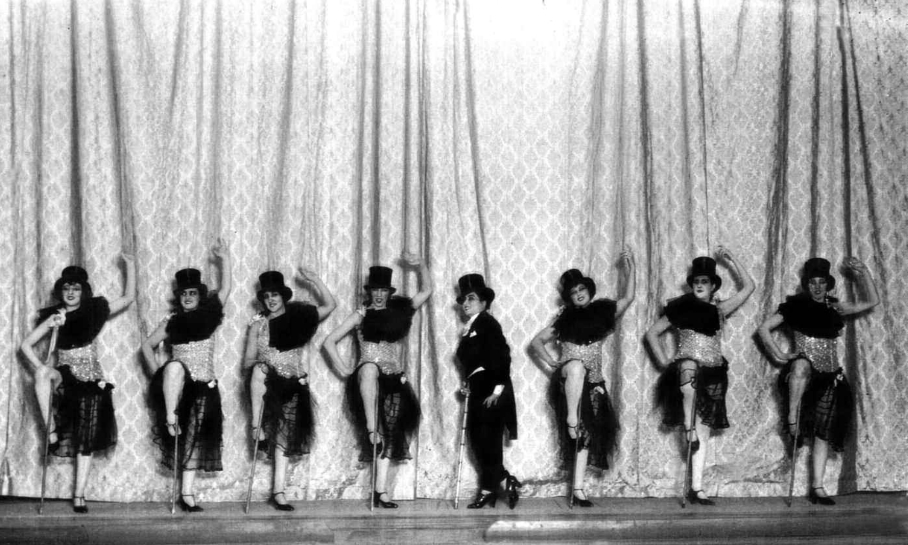
María Esther Podestá dressed in tails in a revue around 1919.

In 1957, theatre historian Luis Ordaz wrote of the revista porteña that, with the political upheavals of the 1890s, the atmosphere of agitation felt in the streets boldly made its way onto the stage, becoming a sharp instrument of mockery and criticism.

On 27 January 1898, the play Ensalada criolla premiered at the Circo Pabellón General Lavalle (on the site of what is now the Escuela Presidente Roca, at Libertad and Tucumán streets); it is considered the "cornerstone of the early revista criolla". It was the first revue to bring together a local writer, composer and company: Enrique Demaría (or De María), Eduardo García Lalanne, and the famous Podestá brothers of the circo criollo (the national circus tradition), respectively. For this reason, Ensalada criolla is described by many historians and critics as the first revista criolla, although this claim is disputed, since works by local writers performed by Spanish companies already existed. Edmundo Guibourg called it "the first one hundred percent local revue", while José Podestá (head of the company) was more measured, describing it as "the first revista born in the circus to go on and conquer many theatres". In any case, the work consolidated the genre with local dialogue, characters and music, most notably the milonga "Soy el rubio Pichinango" by García Lalanne.

The duo of De María and García Lalanne went on to write other revues with suggestive titles, such as En la boca del Riachuelo, Bohemia Criolla, Pica Pica and Compás de dos por cuatro.

=== 1920–1940: Consolidation ===
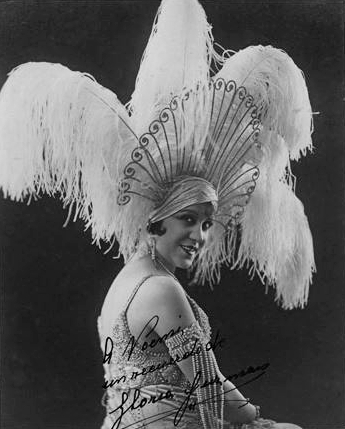
Spanish-born Gloria Guzmán established herself as one of the leading vedettes in Argentine revue.

The great shift in the local revue—which would bring about the transition from the revista criolla to the revista porteña—began in April 1922, when Madame Rasimi—founder of the Ba-Ta-Clan theatre in Paris—arrived in Buenos Aires with her company of scantily clad vedettes, staging the revue Paris Chic, which caused a great impact on the porteño public. This was followed by Rasimi's revues Au Revoir and Pour vous plaire, which were likewise a success and a novelty in the Buenos Aires of the time. In these new revue productions, the vedette Mistinguett stood out, becoming an icon of the genre and a sex symbol of the era, setting a style that would be adopted by local female performers. In his book Historia de las varietés en Buenos Aires (1972), Osvaldo Sosa Cordero described Mistinguett as an unconventional beauty with a raspy voice and singular charm who exerted extraordinary magnetism over audiences from the early years of the century well into its later decades, arriving on stage in a torrent of feathers and rhinestones, satin and silk, wrapped in a spectacular panther coat with her parrot and marmoset in tow.

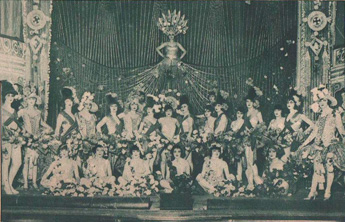
View of the revue Mujeres, flores y alegría, staged at the Maipo theatre in 1926.

In 1923, producer Léon Volterra's company arrived in Buenos Aires with a revue production at the Cervantes theatre which, although more successful than Rasimi's second tour, was "soon forgotten, while Rasimi and her bataclanas would endure in the porteño imagination and theatrical folklore to this day". This period of French influence continued with the 1925 arrival in the country of the chansonnier Maurice Chevalier, accompanied by his wife and stage partner Yvonne Vallée, followed by Randall, who "captivated women with his distinctive style and inspired numerous local imitators". The other great foreign star to arrive in the city in the 1920s was Josephine Baker, who first visited the country in 1928. The American-born dancer, based in Paris and then at the height of her career, was warmly received for her performances at the Astral theatre. The Spanish performers Conchita Piquer and Miguel de Molina also came to the country to join various revue productions.

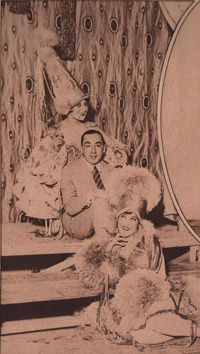
Pepe Arias, Perlita Greco and Laura Hernández in the revue Cabecitas locas, premiered at the Maipo in 1927.

Following the success of Madame Rasimi's revues, local productions emerged seeking to compete with the French style, such as Buenos Aires chic o París reo by Manuel Romero, Pelay and Herrera, Chau París by Roberto Cayol, and Remate del Bataclán by Pascual Contursi. Buenos Aires's revue impresarios, producers and writers looked to the French style, setting aside plot in favour of a succession of sketches, monologues and lavish musical numbers. Mistinguett's stage image—marked by sensuality and lavish, feather-heavy costumes and headdresses—became a reference point for local vedettes, who began wearing more revealing outfits, abandoning flesh-coloured bodices in favour of headdresses with sequins, feathers and tulle. In his column in the newspaper Crítica at the time, theatre critic and historian Edmundo Guibourg observed:

What Madame Rasimi taught us was how to make the most of an ensemble, and a certain good taste in staging. From the battalions of genuine girls she brought, drilled in traditional dance academies, our own porteña girls were born—improvised dancers who skipped every stage of the profession. They, the "pretty faces", the graceful bodies, the poor bataclanas working fourteen hours of daily rehearsal for one hundred and fifty pesos a month with no contract and no union protection, have been the true pillars of every revue. And they have also made the fortunes of the box-office men.

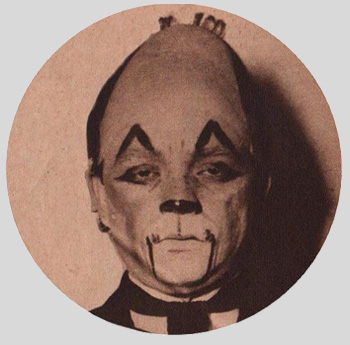
Eduardo de Labar made up as Hipólito Yrigoyen in the revue A misia presidencia, staged at the Maipo theatre in 1928.

On the transition from the revista criolla to the new revista porteña, researcher Martín Rodríguez noted that while the revista criolla had aimed to construct a sense of nationhood by fusing tradition and progress on stage, the revista porteña sought instead to display the audience's dreams—luxury, exoticism, beautiful women—while also provoking laughter and a modest degree of political reflection; in this transition the old narrative gave way to fragmentation and disconnection between segments, with spectacle taking precedence over storytelling, though these changes only became possible because they remained articulated with elements carried over from the older form.

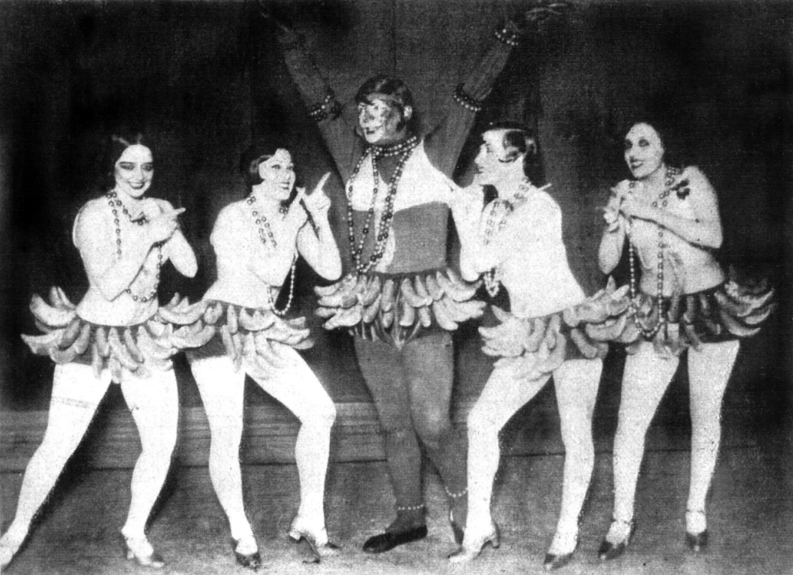
Marcos Caplán in drag and blackface as Joséphine Baker in her iconic banana skirt, in the revue El presidente tiene razón, staged at the Teatro Sarmiento in 1929.

Between 1924 and 1930, the revista porteña experienced a period of great splendour. A clear indicator of this is that in 1926, a peak year for revue production in Buenos Aires, 81 revues premiered (not counting musical comedies), more than double the 40 musical productions that debuted on the New York theatre circuit that same year.

During the 1920s, the first major local stars linked to the genre emerged, including Florencio Parravicini, Sofía and Olinda Bozán, Azucena Maizani, Tita Merello, Alberto Anchart, María Esther Gamas, Gloria Guzmán, Pepe Arias and Mario Fortuna, among others.

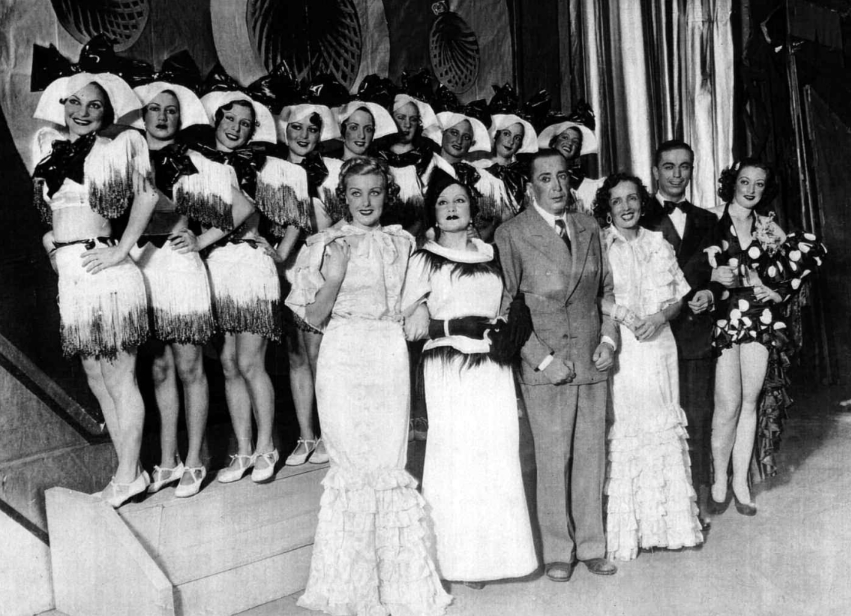
The cast of the Maipo theatre's Revue Company in 1935. Front row, left to right: Alicia Barrié, Gloria Guzmán, Pepe Arias, Sofía Bozán, Juan Carlos Thorry and Aída Olivier.

The consolidation of the revista porteña occurred during a boom period for popular Argentine theatre between 1900 and 1930, which also included other genres such as the sainete (a short comic or comic-dramatic piece based on caricature of local customs, akin to an Argentine commedia dell'arte); the "comedia asainetada" (a longer comic or comic-dramatic piece drawing on devices of the sainete); the "comedia blanca" (a longer piece reworking the conventions of costumbrista melodrama); the "drama nativista" (a descendant of gauchesque literature but without its confrontational character, using melodrama to develop regionalist themes and depict the country's interior culture); and the grotesco criollo (a descendant of the sainete that heightens the tragic sense of reality alongside its comedy), among others.

The music and dance of tango, native to the Río de la Plata, took a leading role in the revue, boosting the popularity of figures such as Azucena Maizani, Libertad Lamarque, Sabina Olmos, Tito Lusiardo, Ignacio Corsini and Agustín Magaldi, among others.

The 1930s brought what is known as the "patriotic fraud" or the "Infamous Decade", a period marked by political violence, the exclusion of parties, and fraudulent electoral practices aimed at preserving the old oligarchic order that the elite regarded as the true path to progress. During the Great Depression, sound cinema began to gain ground as the dominant form of entertainment, overtaking commercial theatre.

=== 1940–1960: Canonical era ===
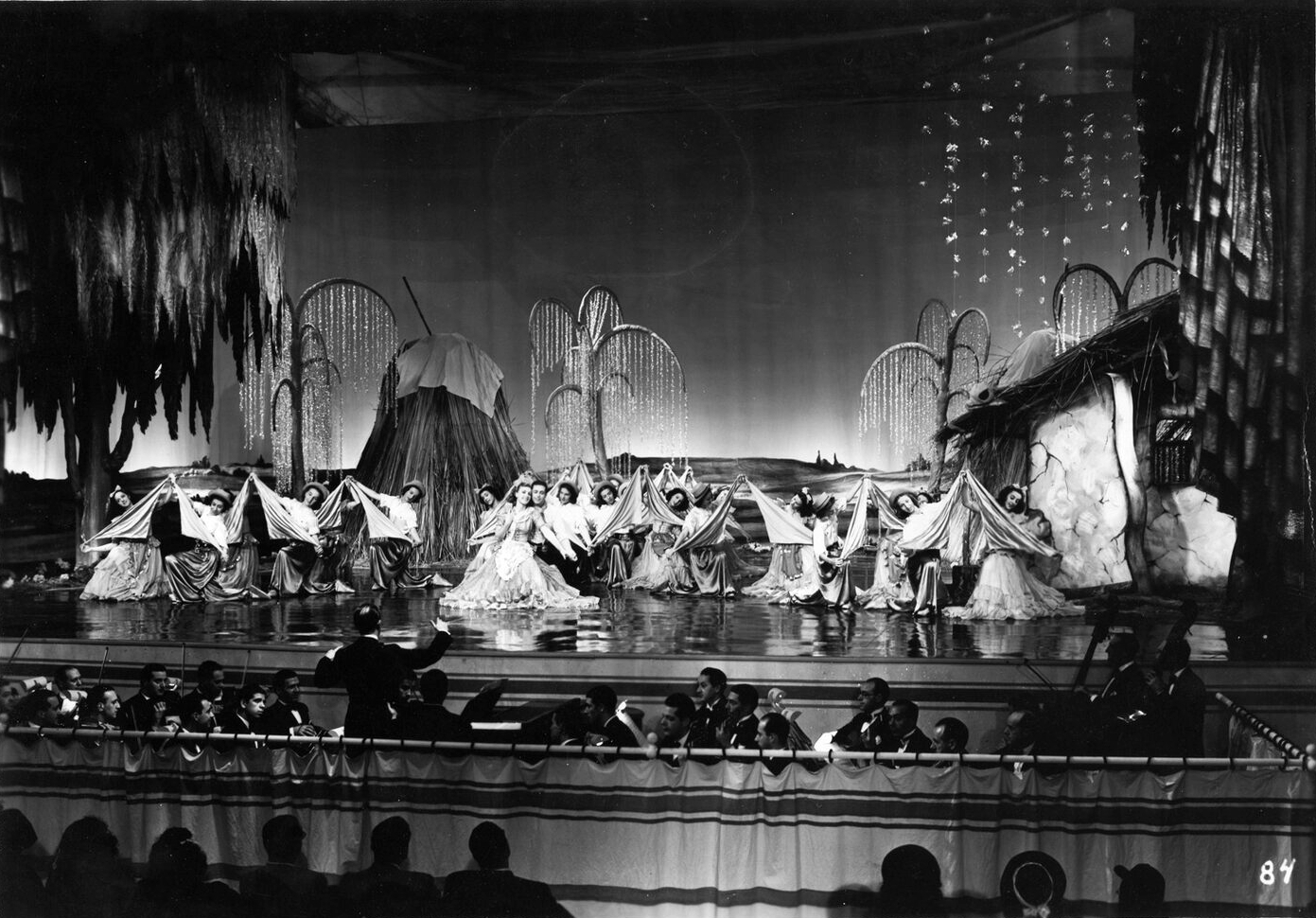
A musical number from a revue as depicted in the classic film Yo quiero ser bataclana (1941) by Manuel Romero.

The period between 1940 and 1960 represents the canonical moment of the revista porteña, during which its distinctive stylistic traits were established, its most iconic performers emerged, and its defining characteristics were consolidated. Also called the "Golden Age" of the revista porteña, it was a period of rising popularity for the genre and of competition among theatres. While in the 1930s the revista porteña had shared billing with its predecessor the revista criolla, by the late 1940s the former had grown so much that it caused the complete disappearance of the latter. According to Raquel Prestigiacomo, this marked the uncontested beginning of the genre's reign, which, like the tango or the city bus, came to be synonymous with Buenos Aires. Pablo Gorlero noted that, by the 1940s and 1950s, the revue was "definitively porteño"—without a plot, made up of short comic segments, monologues, songs, choreography and scantily clad girls. To the genre's already established figures were added new monologists and vedettes, including José "Pepitito" Marrone, Margarita Padín, Dringue Farías, Fanny Navarro, Humberto Ortiz, Alfredo Barbieri, Rafael Carret, Adolfo Stray, Pedrito Rico, Blanquita Amaro, Amelia Vargas, Gogó and Tono Andreu, Jorge Luz, Xénia Monty, Alicia Márquez, Juan Carlos Mareco and Juanita Martínez.

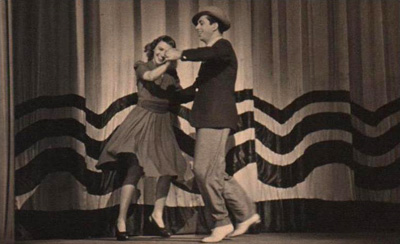
Lita Enhart and Juan Carlos Thorry in the revue ¡Qué problema el de la carne!, staged at the Maipo in 1941.

According to Prestigiacomo, after the outbreak of the Second World War in 1939 the revue adopted a more restrained, less lavish tone than before. By the early 1940s the genre had turned almost entirely to political subject matter, as shown by works such as El dólar está cabrero and El gran casorio político, shaped by the difficulties of Roberto M. Ortiz's presidency—who, owing to ill health, delegated power to Ramón S. Castillo in 1940 and later resigned in 1942, allowing Castillo to assume the presidency fully. Amid political instability, the Castillo government was marked by authoritarianism and electoral fraud. In those years the comedian Pepe Iglesias performed his most celebrated monologue, titled Las tres virtudes políticas: Santa Fe, Esperanza y Fraude (a pun on the names of two Argentine provinces and the word for "fraud"). References to politics, however, did not always carry a critical edge and were often used to convey conservative messages. For example, in a review of the revue El dictador en el Maipo (1941), an indignant writer for Crítica noted that the show satirised the democratic governments of other countries with the "evident aim of exalting dictatorships by contrast".

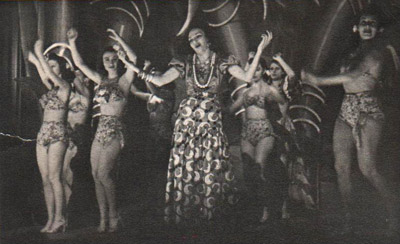
Blackie, María Zubarry and the rest of the female cast in a revue staged at the Maipo theatre in 1942.

The period between the 1943 coup and the election of Juan Domingo Perón as president in 1946 was the period of harshest treatment for the revue, when the new military dictatorship restricted the use of lunfardo (blurring the identity of the tango in the process), references to sex, and political subject matter. Adriana Libonati and Karina Mauro noted that state power echoed the prevailing social expectations of the period, in which appeals to the family were paramount. To deal with censorship without losing audiences, the revue turned to importing foreign figures and rhythms, chiefly from the Caribbean and Brazil. According to Prestigiacomo, this produced a "carioca-isation of choreography and music". Even so, the revue kept trying to bring sociopolitical reality to the stage: in 1944, Ahora sí que estamos bien, con frío y sin kerosén and No hay más estado de sitio, both by Antonio Botta and Marcos Bronenberg, premiered. In the latter, Sofía Bozán, playing Democracy, delivered a monologue titled ¡Cuando voten las mujeres! ("When Women Get to Vote!").

In the late 1930s and early 1940s new faces began appearing at the Maipo. In the 1940s, the leading performers at the theatre on Esmeralda Street were Pepe Arias and myself. Political revue was still being staged, and I can say I was the first to portray Perón on stage. I played Crispín from J. Benavente's Los intereses creados but made up to resemble Perón. It was banned almost immediately. (...) They also hired Ubaldo Martínez to play Farrell. The 1940s mark the decline of the political revue. (...) I played almost every president of the Republic on stage, from Hipólito Yrigoyen to Perón.

— Marcos Caplán (1905–1979)

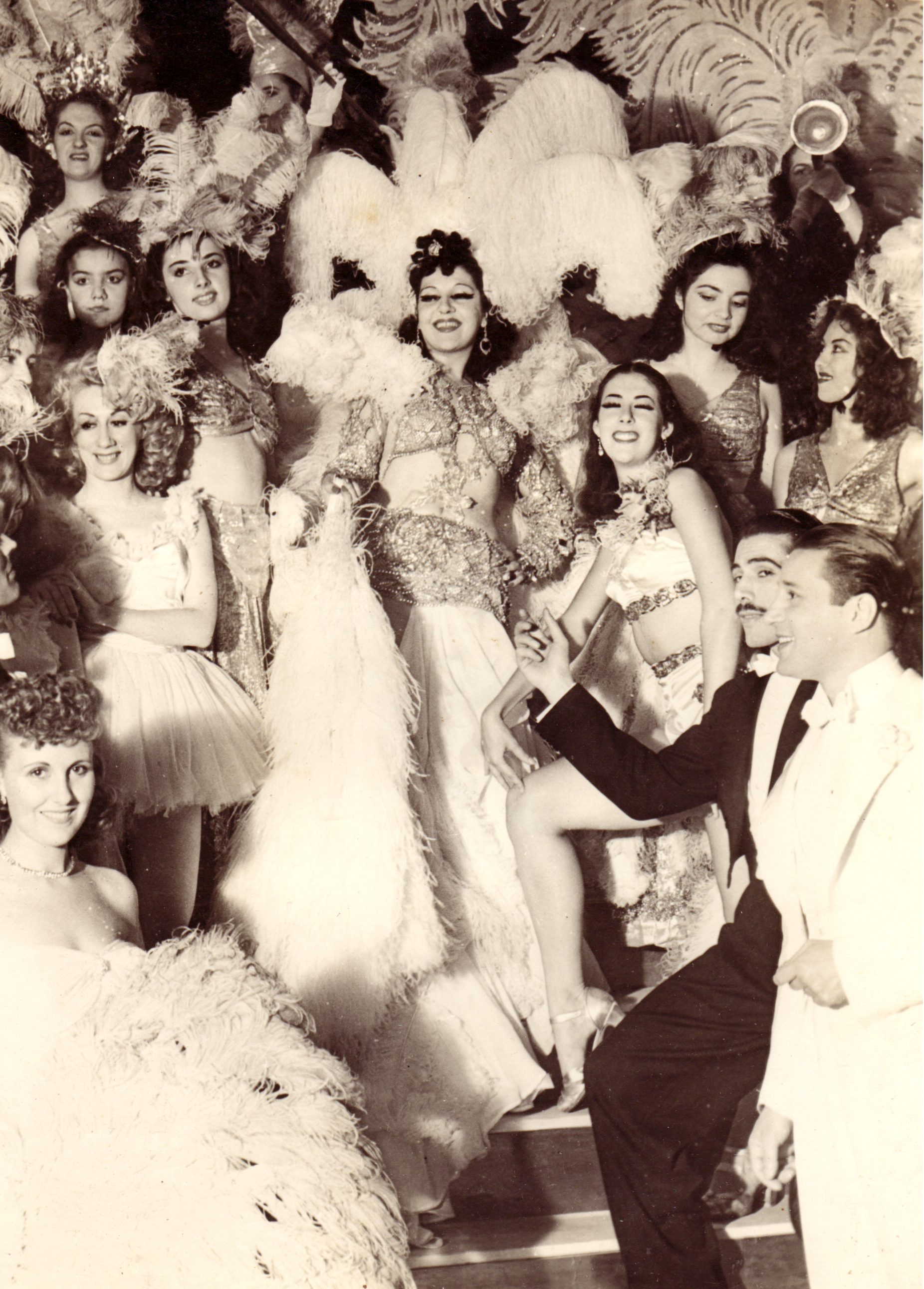
The vedette Sarah Rivera (centre) in a revue from the 1940s.

Perón's first government took a censorious approach to theatre and other cultural products, in which the role of official Raúl Apold proved decisive. Direct parody of political figures was banned, and indirect reference—a key device in the revue's political humour—was likewise restricted. Unlike earlier governments, under which certain cultural spaces had allowed greater freedom, no tacit agreement existed between artists, audiences and critics under Peronism for addressing political subjects subtly or implicitly. Libonati and Mauro suggested this was probably because Peronism's social base was drawn from the working classes, who were themselves consumers of revues and of mass-media content generally, including radio and film. Interviewed by Siete Días Ilustrados in 1974, the well-known theatrical impresario Carlos A. Petit said that political humour, which had returned in the 1930s, weakened and eventually died out during the Peronist government, noting that once topical gags could no longer be used, humour turned to eroticism, in an environment where cinema was growing progressively racier and the revue found itself competing with the surrounding pornography. Marcos Bronemberg, however, argued that political parody did not disappear in the 1940s, citing the revue Yo te daré una cosa que empieza con P, in which Raimundo Pastore impersonated Perón and María Esther Gamas played "Doña Rosada" (a play on Casa Rosada). Titles from the era also carried clear political allusions, such as Votos del árbol caído, perones del viento son, ¡Qué fenómeno la política! and ¡Qué frío andar sin saco! (a reference to the "descamisados"), while Sofía Bozán went so far as to joke about Eva Perón's wardrobe.

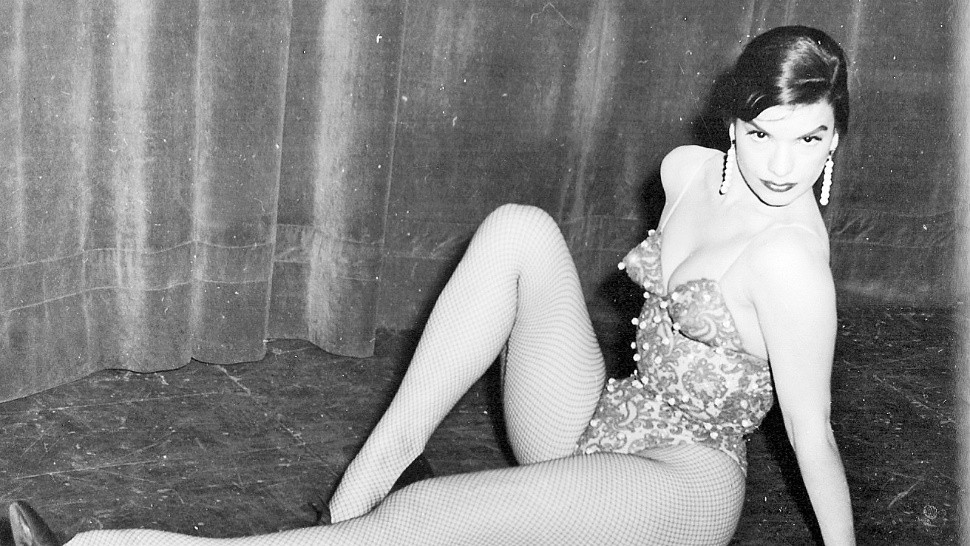
Nélida Roca—who enjoyed her heyday in the 1950s—is regarded as one of the most important vedettes in the genre's history.

Despite the weakening of political humour, the revista porteña went through one of its most splendid periods under Peronism, led by the Maipo and El Nacional theatres. From 1952, following Eva Perón's death and, especially, in the wake of the rupture between Perón and the Catholic Church, the government adopted a "more hedonistic outlook on life", allowing greater openness on matters of sexuality and encouraging popular entertainment. Popular culture received a considerable boost, and productions began to reflect traits typical of the period, such as pronounced nationalism, exalting all things Argentine (as in the revue Estos churros son caseros) and characterising the pre-Peronist period as "prehistory". At the same time, past elements such as the tango and nightlife were incorporated, in an effort to forge a shared historical imaginary and to unite the figure of the spectator with that of the worker. The "undisputed queen" of the period was the vedette Nélida Roca, nicknamed the "Venus of Corrientes Street", who made her debut around 1950. Roca entered the revue through Luis César Amadori and soon became the genre's most prominent vedette, enjoying her greatest splendour in the 1950s and continuing to score major successes until her definitive retirement in the 1970s. She is considered a legend of the genre and its foremost embodiment of the vedette figure. These years also saw the consolidation of the career of Carlos A. Petit, one of the genre's most prominent impresarios—nicknamed the "tsar of the revue"—who joined the El Nacional theatre in 1952 after partnering with its director Enrique Muscio, having previously worked at leading theatres on Corrientes Avenue such as the Maipo, the Ópera, the Odeón, the Comedia and the Politeama.

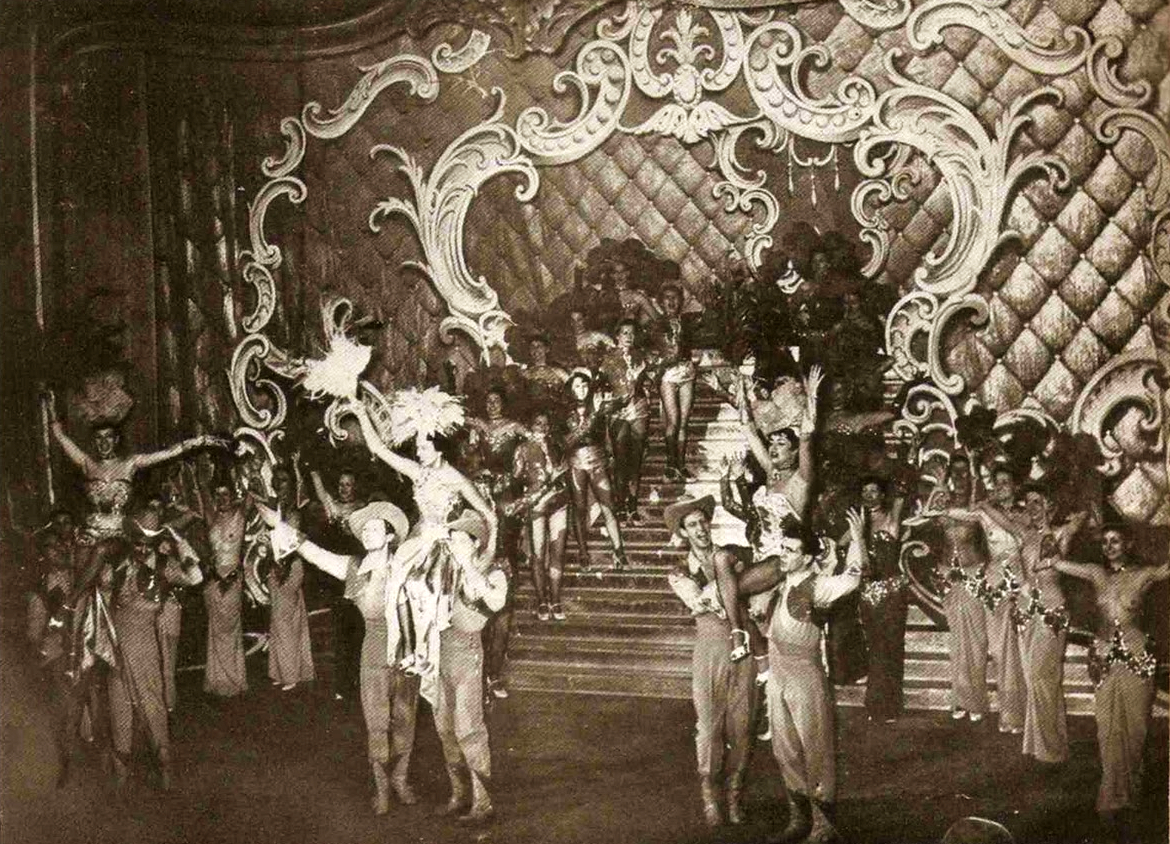
The Folies Bergère of Paris performing at the Ópera theatre in 1954, an event that brought about changes in the local revue.

In March 1954, the revista porteña was shaken by the premiere of a production by the Folies Bergère of Paris at the Ópera theatre, brought over by impresario Clemente Lococo. Titled Folies de París, the show was a lavish, over-18 production imported wholly from France, including cast, director, costumes, choreography and sets. The following year another French production, that of the Lido, premiered with equally strong impact. The local revue scene reacted immediately to the French productions, staging works that either extolled national identity in contrast to them or alluded to their use of nudity, such as Gran Festival Porteño and Estos churros son caseros at the Maipo; ¡Chau belleza!, De París llegó el desnudo, El Folies se hizo porteño and Igualito que París at the Comedia theatre; Buenos Aires versus París at El Nacional; and Los misterios del desnudo and Se dio el desnudo at the Argentino theatre. Although the impact of the Folies and Lido productions recalled that of the French shows of the 1920s, Prestigiacomo noted that, unlike Madame Rasimi's French performers in 1922, they left little lasting mark on the revista porteña, which by then was already sufficiently Frenchified for River Plate tastes. French influence made itself felt through a renewed taste for luxury and opulence in sets and costumes, semi-nude chorus girls, more elaborate programmes, and the arrival of performers such as Christine Niky, Xénia Monty and May Avril, who chose to remain in the city to work in the revista porteña. Argentine vedettes began incorporating nudity into their acts, with Thelma del Río the first to dare, although, unlike the French shows, the porteño public preferred maximum suggestion over full nudity, which it considered inelegant.

According to a 1974 feature, political satire returned to the revue after 1955, though not for long, as the lavishness and high cost of the productions demanded long runs, which were at odds with the fast-changing pace of politics.

=== 1960–1975: Final years of splendour ===
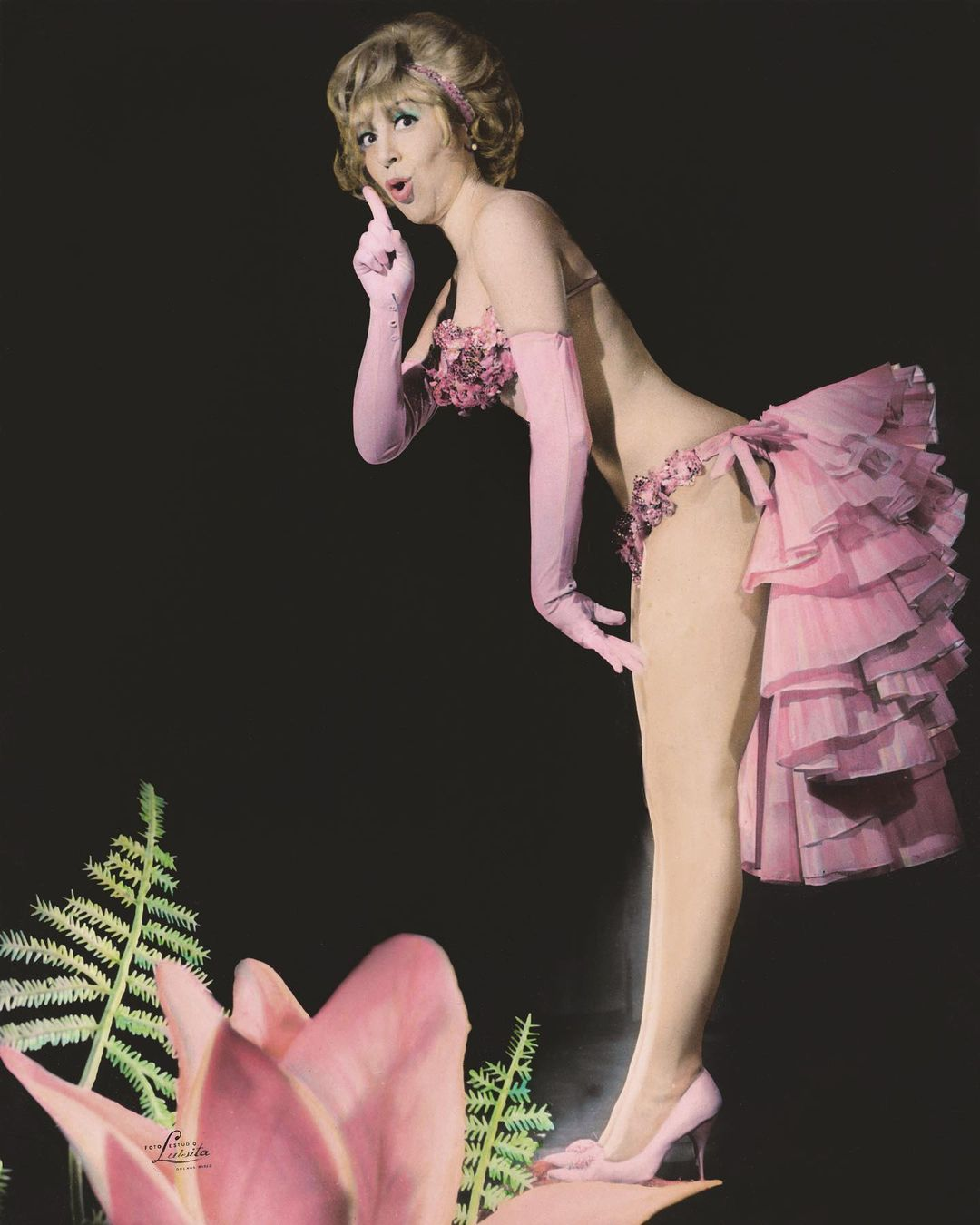
The vedette Juanita Martínez in 1964.

In the 1960s, the revista porteña had to compete with the café-concert. A new, "more subdued [and] less political" style of humour began to spread through revue productions during the decade.

In 1969, Carlos A. Petit hired Nélida Lobato—who had built a successful career in the United States and Paris—as vedette for the revue Corrientes... casi esquina Champs Elysées at the El Nacional theatre, which was a great success. Lobato's career during the 1970s—split between the Maipo and El Nacional theatres—established her as one of the most important vedettes in the history of the revista porteña, comparable to Nélida Roca.

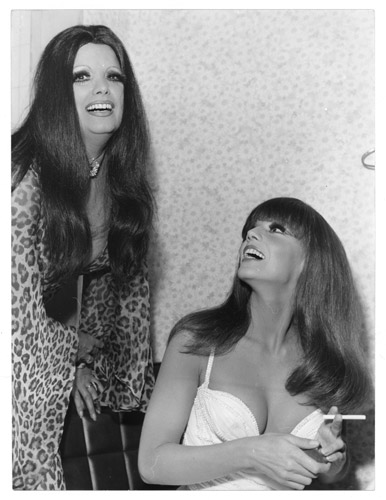
Nélida Roca and Susana Giménez backstage during La revista de oro, staged at the Maipo theatre in 1974.

Despite starting to lose popularity, the revue kept producing hits. In a 1974 feature, Siete Días Ilustrados reported that the revue theatre was going through a fresh boom that year, with new venues opening, new vedettes arriving from television and film, and the return of veteran performers. The article reported strong box-office figures for several venues that year, including the Astros, the newly opened Sans Souci, the Maipo (featuring Ethel and Gogó Rojo and Juan Verdaguer), and the Cómico, then running Banana mecánica. In its year-end review, the magazine Gente reported "record figures" for the theatre, with two revues topping the year's box office: La revista de oro, staged at the Astros, and El Maipo es el Maipo, starring Nélida Lobato, Dringue Farías and Katia Iaros. La revista de oro marked the vedette debut of the former model Susana Giménez, as well as the return—and final show—of Nélida Roca, who by then was described in the press as a "living legend", the "undisputed queen of the revista porteña" and an "unprecedented phenomenon".

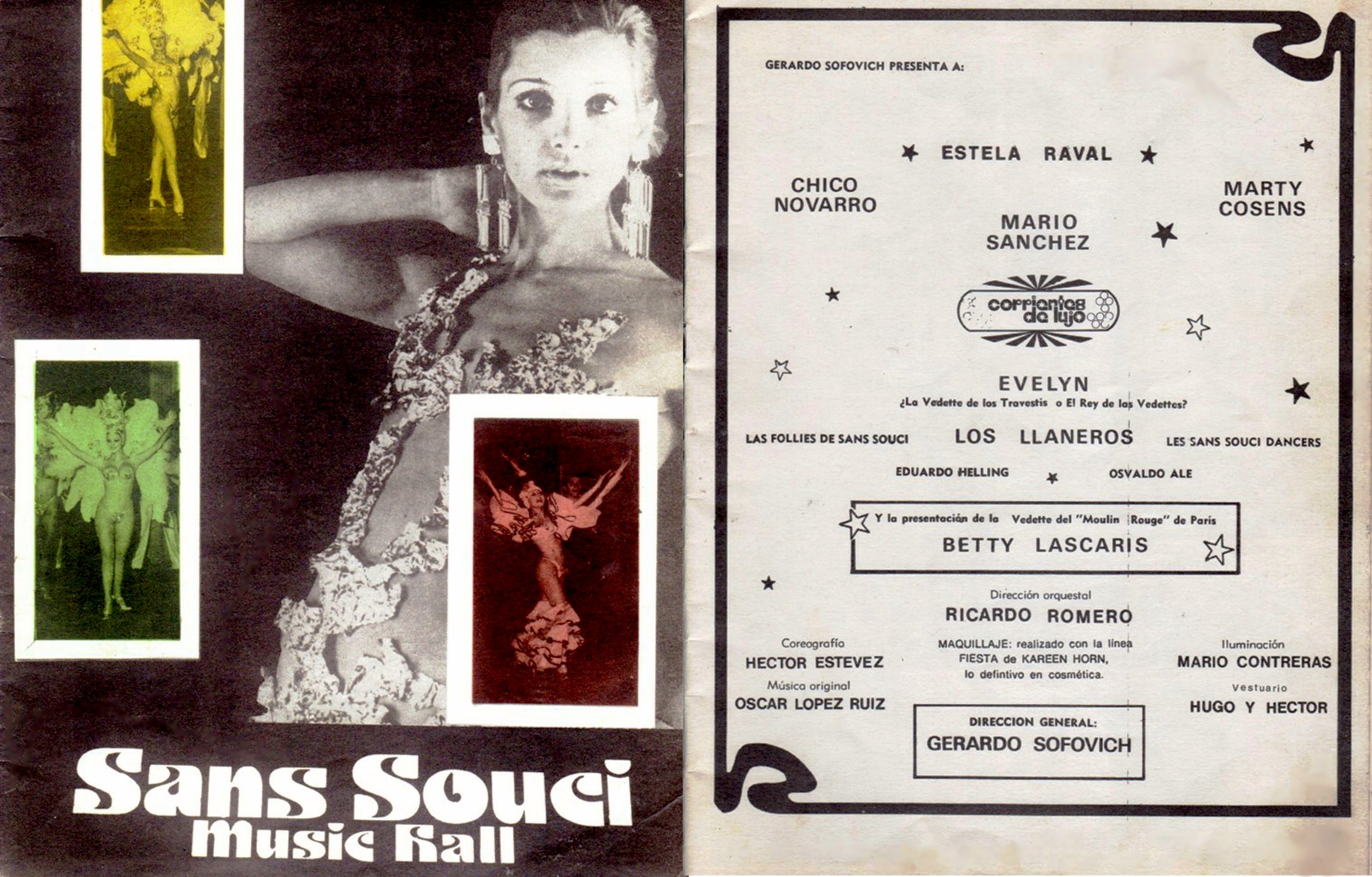
Programme for the revue Corrientes está de lujo at the Sans Souci theatre in 1975.

The 1970s were also a period of "travesti artistic unveiling", which began with the arrival of a Brazilian trans performer at a well-known Buenos Aires theatre. Her show paved the way for later performances by local travesti artists. Vanessa Show was the first travesti-trans leading vedette of the revista porteña. Regarded as a pioneering figure, she became one of the most famous travesti vedettes in the revue theatre, appearing in productions such as Corrientes... casi esquina Champs Elyseés and ¿Pourquoi pas? alongside Nélida Lobato. A less remembered, though recently rediscovered, figure is the "female impersonator" Jorge "Evelyn" Pérez, who from 1974 appeared in revues such as Los vecinos de Corrientes, Verdísimo, Una noche de locura and Corrientes de lujo, the latter being the highlight of her career in the country. Both Vanessa Show and Evelyn were forced into exile abroad in the mid-1970s owing to threats and violent attacks by security forces.

=== 1975–present: Decline and disappearance ===
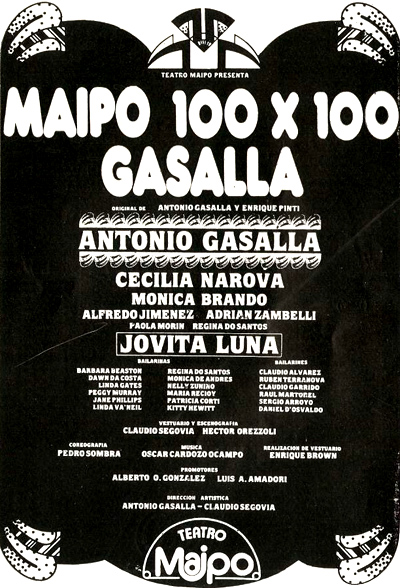
Poster for Antonio Gasalla's revue Maipo 100x100 Gasalla, staged at the Maipo theatre in 1981.

Attendance at revue theatres declined significantly after the economic crisis of the second half of 1975 known as the Rodrigazo, which resulted in a 400% increase in ticket prices. Before that economic shock, revue audiences made up roughly 48% of theatregoers, but by 1976 that figure had fallen to 25%. In contrast, "legitimate" drama theatre grew rapidly, coming to occupy the position the revue once held, reaching 50% overall.

Speculation about the decline or disappearance of the revista porteña has circulated since the 1970s. Although it endured, the revue "degenerated", becoming progressively more misogynistic and vulgar. According to Gorlero, its heyday continued until the mid-1980s, but with the return of democracy and freedom, Argentines turned their backs on the revista porteña, which died out despite some later, worthwhile attempts to revive it.

A novelty of the 1990s was the inclusion of a travesti performer as the leading female figure in the revue, when previously travesti performers had been limited to being degraded and verbally and physically mistreated by the comedian during sketches often laden with groping and every kind of obscenity. The trend began with the 1995 premiere of Viva la revista en el Maipo, with Cris Miró as its central figure. Trastoy and Zayas de Lima note that this shift away from the classic revue formula occurred because sexual and political transvestism had become the show's true subject. From then on, other revue productions featured travesti performers as central figures regardless of theme.

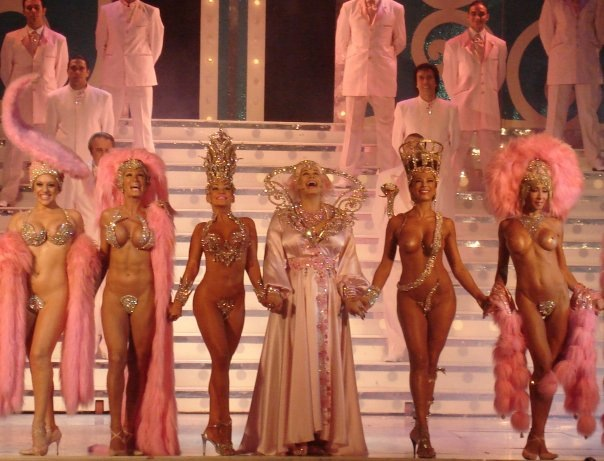
Final bow of Vedettísima at the Tabarís theatre in 2009, with María Eugenia Ritó, Carmen Barbieri and Ximena Capristo at centre.

The 21st century has been marked by a continued decline of the revista porteña as a dominant form of entertainment, despite the efforts of some performers to keep it relevant. Prominent comedians such as Juan Carlos Calabró, Enrique Pinti, Antonio Gasalla and Carlos Perciavalle remained active, and new talents emerged, but none matched the brilliance of the stars of earlier eras. Producer Lino Patalano, who died in 2022, was one of the last to drive the genre forward with ambitious productions, following the loss of other major producers such as Hugo Sofovich (died 2003) and Gerardo Sofovich (died 2015), with no one else able to fill the void they left. Performers such as Moria Casán, an enduring icon, along with Jorge Corona, Adabel Guerrero, Miguel Ángel Cherutti and Nito Artaza, headed various projects that drew audiences, though without recovering the genre's former splendour. Even journalist Jorge Lanata ventured into the genre in 2008 with La rotativa del Maipo, a notable but ultimately insufficient attempt to revitalise it.

According to Fabio Ladetto, the decline of the revista porteña is largely attributed to the absence of a central capocómico, a key figure of the genre's classic style. These performers, known as "cortineros" for their monologues delivered in front of the curtain, were essential to holding the audience's attention. In their place, ensemble farces with choral casts were promoted, in which humour was spread among several performers rather than resting on a single star, marking a significant shift in the revue's traditional structure.

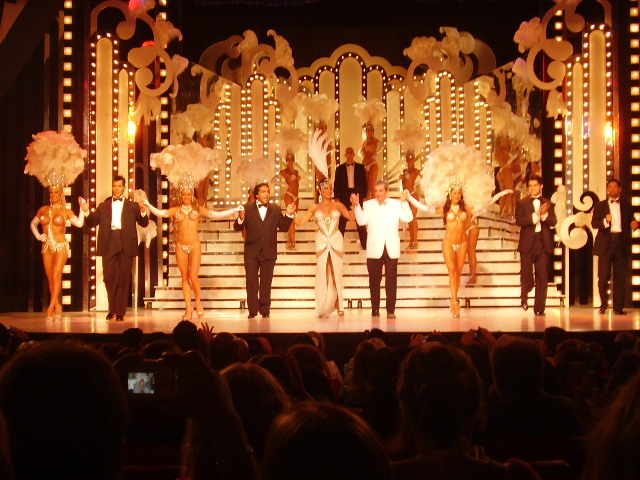
The cast of the show La fiesta está en el lago, staged in Villa Carlos Paz in 2009, with Florencia de la V, Mónica Farro and "El Negro Álvarez", among others.

In a 2012 feature on the state of the revista porteña, La Nación noted that those who had lived through and witnessed its transformations said that few, if any, contemporary productions still respected all the conventions that had traditionally defined the genre. Interviewed for the article, Moria Casán, Carmen Barbieri and Nito Artaza agreed that the genre in its pure form no longer existed. Casán argued that contemporary revues were really music halls, while Artaza pointed to television's influence, noting that sketches could no longer be sustained for long because audiences were used to the pace of channel-surfing.

In the late 2010s and early 2020s, the rise of feminism had an impact on the reception of the revista porteña, a genre commonly associated with humour based on the objectification of women. In February 2020, Perfil interviewed ten actresses about the role of women in revue theatre following these social changes. Vedette Nerina Sist said the genre had changed enormously, noting that the once-standard skimpy G-string had given way to more modest coverage and that shows had become lighter and more family-oriented, unlike the revues of the past that emphasised bare bodies. Ana Acosta, for her part, said that the vedette could not be taken out of the genre without it ceasing to be a revue, but that outdated sketches which had mocked women rather than laughing along with them had been changed.

In 2018, playwright Roberto Perinelli declared the revue effectively dead, arguing that it had thrived in an era when seeing a naked woman was something of a marvel, whereas today a computer or television screen offers a hundred thousand at a glance; he added that, in a time of very strict official censorship, the revue theatre had nonetheless been allowed to say things that were impossible elsewhere.

== Legacy ==
Although historically dismissed as a minor, "vulgar" genre, the revista porteña is regarded as a central point of reference in the cultural history of the city of Buenos Aires. In 2013, the Legislature of the Autonomous City of Buenos Aires declared it Cultural Heritage of the city under Law No. 4771, adding it to a list that includes other local cultural expressions such as tango and fileteado.

In 2023, the genre again attracted attention as a key element of the plot of the second season of the telenovela Argentina, tierra de amor y venganza, broadcast on Canal 13. In 2025, the Teatro Nacional Cervantes premiered La Revista del Cervantes, an ambitious production paying tribute to the revista porteña. In 2026, the revista porteña was portrayed in Moria, a Netflix biographical miniseries about the vedette Moria Casán.

== See also ==
- List of works by Manuel Romero
- Theatre in Argentina
- Vaudeville

== Bibliography ==
- Demaría, Gonzalo (2011). La revista porteña. Teatro efímero entre dos revoluciones (1890-1930) (PDF) (in Spanish). Buenos Aires: Instituto Nacional del Teatro. ISBN 978-987-9433-90-4.
- Trastoy, Beatriz; Zayas de Lima, Perla (2006). Lenguajes escénicos (in Spanish). Buenos Aires: Prometeo Libros. ISBN 987-574-111-6 – via Google Books.
- Pellettieri, Osvaldo, ed. (2001). Historia del teatro argentino en Buenos Aires: La emancipación cultural (1884-1930) (in Spanish). Buenos Aires: Galerna, Faculty of Philosophy and Letters, University of Buenos Aires. ISBN 978-950-556-437-8 – via Google Books.
- Pellettieri, Osvaldo, ed. (2003). De Eduardo De Filippo a Tita Merello. Del cómico italiano al "actor nacional" argentino (II) (in Spanish). Buenos Aires: Galerna, Faculty of Philosophy and Letters, University of Buenos Aires. ISBN 978-950-556-452-1 – via Google Books.
- Prestigiacomo, Raquel (1995). En busca de la revista perdida: Entre monologuistas y bataclanas (in Spanish). Buenos Aires: Colihue. ISBN 978-950-581-248-6 – via Google Books.
