= Porteño =

Demonym for inhabitants of a port city in the Spanish language

Porteño (feminine: Porteña, lit. 'port city person' in Spanish) is mainly used to refer to the residents of Buenos Aires, Argentina. It is also used for other port cities, such as El Puerto de Santa María, Spain; Valparaíso, Chile; Mazatlán, Veracruz, Acapulco and Tampico, Mexico; Puerto Cabello, Venezuela; Puerto Colombia, Colombia; Puerto Suárez in Bolivia; Puerto Cortés, Honduras; Puntarenas, Costa Rica, and Montevideo, Uruguay.
