= Juanita Martínez =

Argentine vedette

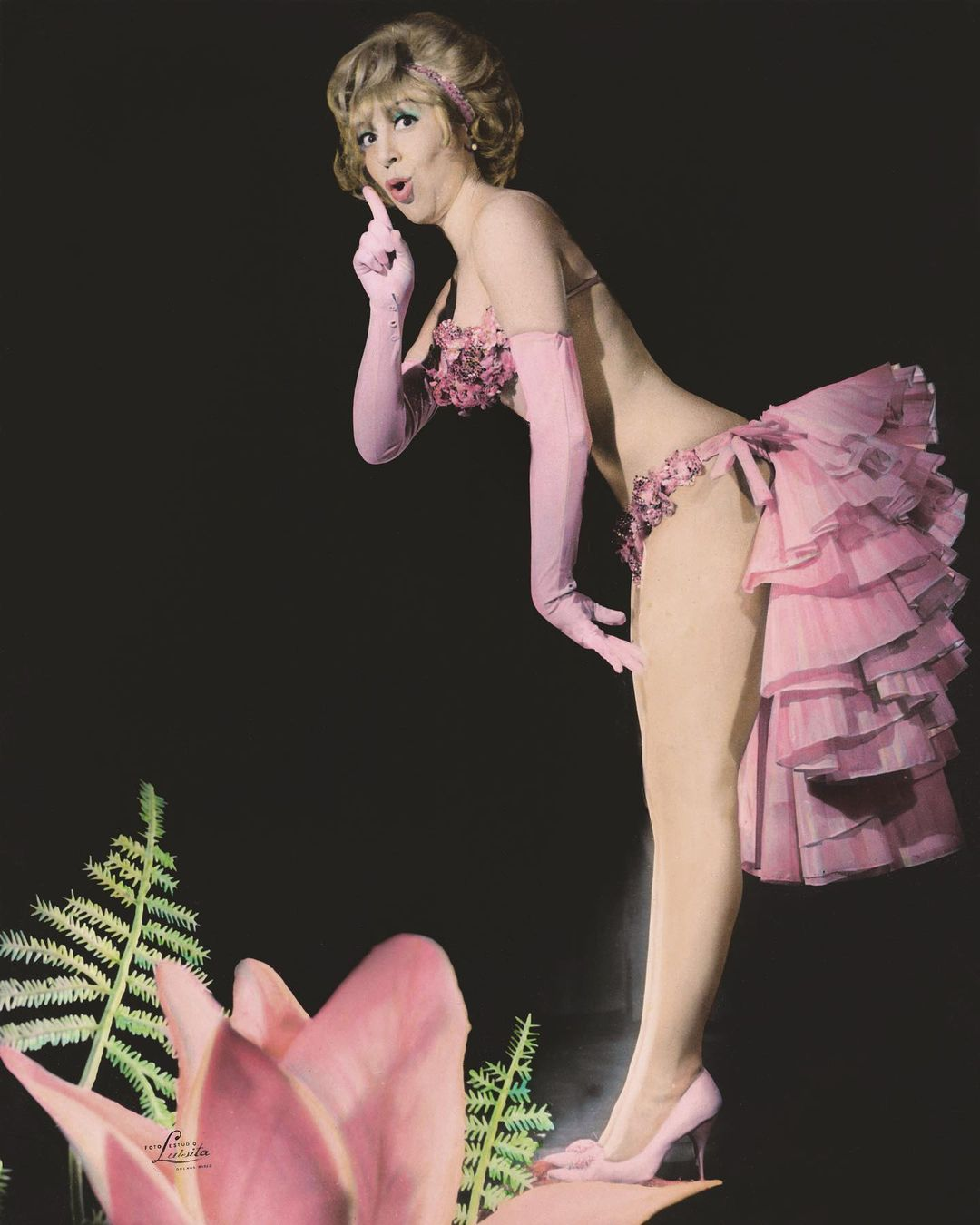
- Juanita Martínez in 1964
- Born: 10 May 1925; Buenos Aires, Argentina
- Died: 12 May 2001 (aged 76); Buenos Aires, Argentina
- Occupation(s): actress, vedette
- Years active: 1920s–1970s
- Spouse: José Marrone (m.1972–1990; his death)

Juanita Martínez (10 May 1925 – 12 May 2001) was an Argentine vedette, who starred in revue shows. She also worked as a film, television and theater actress. She was the wife of actor Jose "Pepe" Marrone and often performed with him.

== Biography ==
Juanita Martínez was born on 10 May 1925 in the San Isidro neighborhood of Buenos Aires, Argentina. She attended the National Conservatory and was a classmate of Beba Bidart, Nené Cao and Ángel Eleta. She was offered her first job, as a dancer, in 1938, having to obtain a special permit because she was minor. She worked for three years in various dance companies and then decided to join a burlesque show, despite her family's objections.

She played in many review shows in costumes made of elaborate feathers and provocative dresses and became a star of revue. She was known for her mischievous humor, irony and sometimes spontaneous irreverent retorts. She played alongside some of the biggest names of the Argentine stage: Pepe Arias, Gloria Guzmán, Dringue Farias, Nelida Lobato, Nélida Roca and Adolfo Stray.

In 1950, she met the comic José Marrone and they began working together in a production of El cabo Scamione at the Teatro Astral. The two became a couple, both in their private lives and careers, but could not marry as Marrone was married and his wife was ill. When she died, the couple were married in 1972 and were together until Marrone's death in 1990.

Martínez had been suffering from cancer and committed suicide on 12 May 2001 in her apartment in Buenos Aires.

== Filmography ==
=== Films ===
- Cristóbal Colón en la Facultad de Medicina (1962)
- El mago de las finanzas (1962)

=== Television ===
- Los trabajos de Marrone (1960/1963)
- Viernes de Pacheco (1968/1973)
- El circo de Marrone (1970/1971)
- El Circo del 9 (1971)
- El boliche de Marrone (1972)
- Corrientes y Marrone... la esquina de la revista (1973)
- Cebollitas (1997/1998)
