= Cris Miró =

Argentine showgirl (1965–1999)

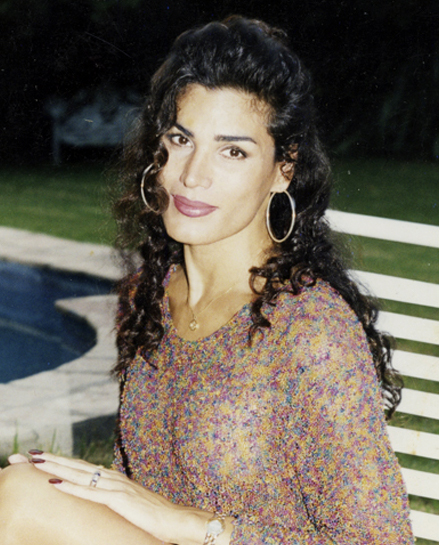
- Cris Miró during her last summer theater season in Mar del Plata, 1998, in a photograph held at the Archivo de la Memoria Trans
- Born: 16 September 1965; Buenos Aires, Argentina
- Died: 1 June 1999 (aged 33); Buenos Aires, Argentina
- Occupations: Entertainer; actress; media personality
- Years active: 1994—1999
- Known for: Being the first Argentine travesti to gain nation-wide fame

Cris Miró (16 September 1965 – 1 June 1999) was an Argentine entertainer and media personality who had a brief but influential career as a top-billing vedette in the Buenos Aires revue scene during the mid-to-late 1990s. Miró began her acting career in the early 1990s in fringe theatre plays and later rose to fame as a vedette at the Teatro Maipo in 1995. For years, she hid her HIV positive status from the press until her death on 1 June 1999, due to AIDS-related lymphoma.

Although she was not the first trans woman or travesti in the history of Argentine showbusiness (with precursors like Vanessa Show and Evelyn), Miró became the first to become famous nation-wide and enter the mainstream, which caused a media sensation and paved the way for the visibility of the transgender community in local society. Nevertheless, her figure was initially questioned by some members of the burgeoning travesti activism movement, who resented the unequal treatment she received compared to most trans people. She is now regarded as a symbol of the Argentine 1990s.

== Early life ==
Cris Miró was born on 16 September 1965, in Buenos Aires to a retired military man and a housewife.

Although assigned male at birth, Miró was effeminate from a very young age. Her brother Esteban Virguez described Miró's childhood as a little boy: "Cris was different since he was born, (...) he did not like football, he played with dolls and my dad was the typical macho of those times and Cris was like a girl, when we were walking down the street they always confused him with a girl. At that time we were ashamed, somehow my dad and I tried to hide it. Not my mother, Cris identified with my mother, he saw her shoes, her dresses. It bothered us."

After finishing secondary school, Miró began studying dentistry at the University of Buenos Aires.

She studied dance at Julio Bocca's school and acting with Alejandra Boero at the same time that she studied dentistry.

== Career ==
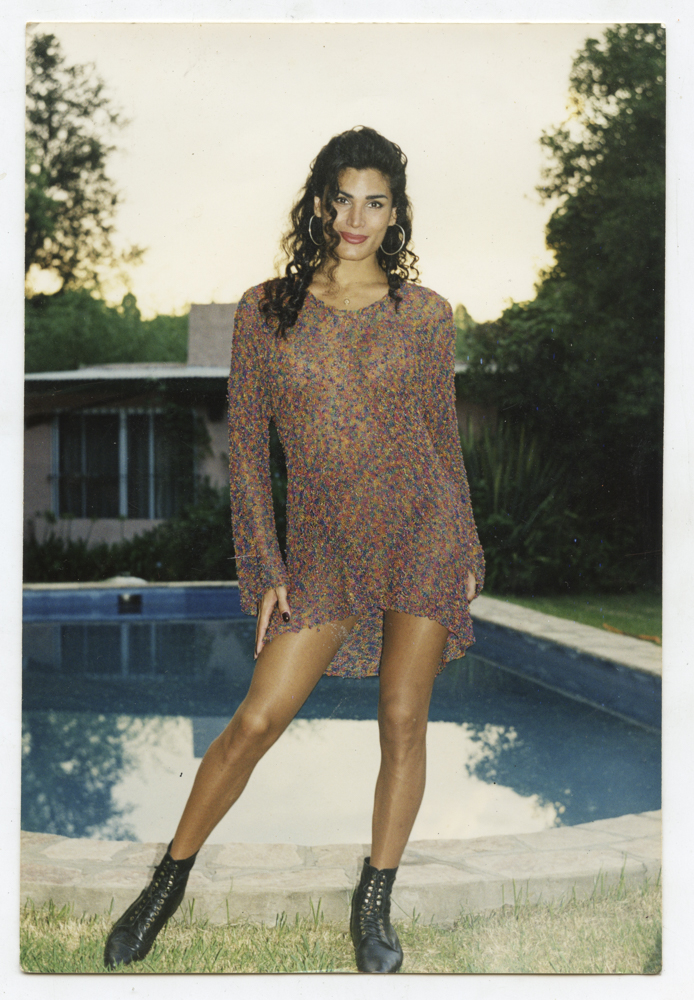
Miró in Mar del Plata, 1998.

In the late 1980s, Miró met theater director Jorgelina Belardo at Bunker—a popular gay club in Buenos Aires—who asked her to join a theatrical production group that Belardo had formed with Juanito Belmonte. Belardo became Miró's close friend and artistic director, while Belmonte worked as her press agent. Working with them, Miró made her fringe theatre debut in the plays Fragmentos del infierno—based on a text by Antonin Artaud—and Orgasmo apocalíptico, which focused on sexuality issues more explicitly. Prior to her career as a vedette, Miró made film appearances in Fernando Ayala's Dios los cría (1991) and Luis Puenzo's La peste (1992), based on Albert Camus' novel of the same name.

In 1994, Miró went to a casting call at Teatro Maipo, one of the most important venues in the Buenos Aires revue theatre scene (in Spanish teatro de revistas), which was a widely popular genre at the time. She only presented herself as a female once on stage, performing a strip-tease to a Madonna song. Producer Lino Patalano immediately cast her as a vedette for his show Viva la revista en el Maipo, which premiered in 1995 and quickly made her a celebrity. Miró appeared at Mirtha Legrand's famous television program, in which guests have lunch with her and are interviewed. That broadcast is now infamous for the uncomfortable questions that Legrand asked Miró, such as her dead name or if "it bothers you that people know that you are really a man". At that time, questions like these were common to transgender guests on television, but are negatively assessed in retrospect.

== Illness and death ==
On 20 May 1999, Miró was hospitalized in the Santa Isabel clinic in the Buenos Aires barrio of Caballito, where she died on 1 June. The press had long speculated that the entertainer lived with HIV/AIDS, although she and her family and friends always denied it. Miró actually did live with HIV and had been hospitalized for this on previous occasions, choosing to hide it from the media out of fear that the stigma between homosexuality and the virus would affect her career and family relationships. According to Jorgelina Belardo, a sector of the press threatened to disclose her HIV diagnosis if she refused to give interviews. Upon her death, Miró's personal assistant Jorge García and her friend Sandra Sily denied the reports of HIV complications and told reporters that she died due to a lung condition. Later that day, Miró's manager Juanito Belmonte—although maybe Jorge Belardo— confirmed that her cause of death was lymphatic cancer. Although this was true, for many years it was publicly concealed that the lymphoma was indeed AIDS-related. This was confirmed when her brother Esteban Virguez disclosed it to journalist Carlos Sanzol in 2010, who later revealed it in his 2016 biography on Miró titled Hembra.

== Impact and legacy ==
"Cris Miró was a symbol: she (Note: In this citation, the author uses male pronouns when referring to Miró, which have been edited to reflect the subject's preferred self-identification, in accordance with Wikipedia's identity guideline.) was someone who could expose her [travestility], but who also achieved the acceptance of society. Because before her, travestis had no place and less public place, (...). After her that changed. She was the first public figure to define herself as a woman even though she was born a man. (...) The Cris Miró phenomenon had a great social impact, since it made public everything that was hidden about travestis, homosexuality, and managed to get it accepted. But surely a figure will appear to replace her, because she was not the first. For example, we can cite Bibi Andersson [sic] in Spain."

— Argentine sexologist León Gindin reflecting on Miró's death, Página/12, 1999.

After gaining popularity as a vedette, Miró became a national media sensation for the perceived gender bender aspects of her image, and is considered a symbol of the postmodern era in Argentina. As the first Argentine travesti to become a national celebrity, she has been considered the "first trans icon of the country". Miró's presence meant a change in the Argentine showbusiness of the era and popularized transgender and cross-dressing acts in Buenos Aires' revue theatrical scene. As such, she is regarded as a symbol of the social milieu of the Argentine 1990s and an icon of the decade. She paved the way for other Argentine travestis and trans women to gain popularity as vedettes, most notably Flor de la V, who described her in 2021 as the "first trans [person] that the public recognized as an artist" and a "shooting star that lasted only a short time on earth [but] will continue to illuminate the way forever." In an interview with Revista NX in 1997, Miró reflected on her impact:

I am very grateful for what is happening to me, and this has helped open doors for other people. (...) But I do not forget many people who were there and tried, who worked a lot and continue to do so. This regarding the commercial circuit. But it was also important because of all the prejudice that existed around travestis, who were related to [street prostitution], or with the transformistas (...). I think that in a few years these beliefs changed a lot. I do not claim all this myself, but I do know I did my bit because the doors were opened to me, and I always said that those open doors were also going to open for other people and that was the most important thing. [The arrests and torture of travestis] give me feelings of horror. I feel sorry for these things that happen in the country, although this reality occurs in other places. (...) ... I have also experienced those abuses. Going down the street and having problems with the police, with other people; being at the doorstep of an apartment waiting for a taxi to come and being afraid that a patrol car will come and take me away. Some years ago I thought I was never going to live this Argentina of achieving rights or respect. For example, that a transsexual is given her documents in accordance with her sexual identity. (Note: Miró is referring to the landmark case of Mariela Muñoz, who in 1997 became the first transsexual to be officially recognized by the Argentine state and was granted the custody of some of the children she had raised.) But everything has a cost. There have been many travestis who are no longer with us, who are imprisoned, who are taken into custody daily, all so that today other people can walk more freely on the street.

Miró's rise to fame in the mid-1990s was a watershed moment in the visibility of transgender identities in Argentine society, as it increased the visibility of the transgender community in the national media scene and opened a debate about their marginalized living conditions. But, although the rise to celebrity of Miró happened in parallel to the political organization of travestis and the visibility of their activism, she never took part in the movement; she was initially criticized by many of its members, who resented the unequal treatment she received compared to the neglected travesti prostitutes. They also criticized Miró for embodying the "patriarchal mandate" that trans women should look like an idealized vision of "the perfect woman". In this sense, she evidenced the desire of thousands of men for the new travesti bodies, with anthropologist Josefina Fernández claiming that: "the exchange that Cris Miró makes while living from her job as a vedette, as a body inserted in a market, does not differ from the exchange that a [travesti street prostitute] is forced to make in order to survive." Reflecting on her death, feminist scholar Mabel Bellucci argued in 1999 that Miró's acceptance was an attempt by "the system" to try to show that there was not so much discrimination, presenting her as "the exception to the rule" and encapsulating her in a role that prevented her from creating ties with her [travesti] peers. She wrote: "If this had meant a greater democratization of the travesti movement she could have achieved a greater recognition of rights." Biographer Carlos Sanzol reflected in 2016:

Cris was somehow both a "beneficiary" and victim of machismo. A beneficiary because she represented the model of "womanhood" that the imaginary of misogyny seeks: the femme fatale, the objectified woman. And a victim because the macho discourse excludes everything that is far from the canon of virility. Seventeen years after her death, these values still persist in Argentine society with their worst facet: femicides.

A portrait photograph of Miró was displayed in 2019 at the Museo Casa Rosada, as part of the exhibition Íconos Argentinos (English: "Argentine Icons").

Her death is featured in the plot of Camila Sosa Villada's 2019 award-winning novel Las malas, being mourned by its trans main characters, who regard her as "the Evita of travestis".

In June 2021, an Argentine producer announced that a biographical television series on Miró was in the making, potentially released via Netflix the following year. The final result was the 2024 series Cris Miró (Ella), directed by Martín Vatenberg and Javier van de Couter, produced by EO Media and Nativa Contenidos, premiered on TNT and the streaming platform Flow, and based on the book Hembra, Cris Miró. Vivir y morir en un país de machos by Carlos Sanzol, with Spanish actress Mina Serrano in the leading role.

== Personal life ==
=== Gender identity ===
Miró identified as a travesti, a loosely defined term used in South American countries to designate people who have been assigned male at birth, but develop a gender identity according to different expressions of femininity. The use of the term in the region precedes that of "transgender" and its definition is controversial, as it may be considered a "third sex", a non-binary gender or a regional equivalent to the concepts of transsexual and trans woman. Until the mid-to-late-1990s, Miró's gender expression alternated between that of an androgynous young man during the day and that of a woman when going out at night or on stage. Around 1997, she had breast augmentation surgery, which indicated a strengthening of her transgender identity as she was said to have taken "the definitive form of a woman". Miró also considered the cosmetic procedure to be a job requirement, as vedettes were expected to sensually flaunt their body parts.

Miró is at times retrospectively referred to as a transsexual or transgender woman. According to biographer Carlos Sanzol, Miró identified as a woman, pointing out that she regularly stated to the press that she "felt like [one]". The vedette told Mirtha Legrand in 1995: "I am genetically born as a man, but I choose and live as a woman and that is the most important thing." In a 1996 television report for Chiche Gelblung, Miró explained her gender identity: "I am totally clear that biologically I was born a man. I do not want to be a woman, I am totally ok with my status as a travesti. But I do not think I am a woman trapped in a man's body. No, I am who I am and in this way I am happy." Another oft-cited statement of Miró was:

Even though I was born with a certain sex, which means that I have documents with a man's name and gender, the most important thing is what I feel. I am only one person, and that is what matters to me. That thing about the opposites is seen by others. I live it in only one way.

=== Relationships ===
A long-lasting rumor states that Miró was romantically involved with her close friend Diego Armando Maradona, although this was never confirmed. Pioneering travesti vedette Vanessa Show stated in 2019: "I used to wax Cris Miró. Her phone wouldn't stop. I sometimes would ask her to turn it off a bit because I couldn't work. At one point she turned it on and he was calling her. This was in the '90s. 'How's Vanessa doing?', he said and I listened. 'How is it turning out?', he asked me and I replied 'very well.' It was vox populi that she was with Maradona. There are gays and non-gays who like travestis in all walks of life. Everywhere."

== Filmography ==
Year	Title	Role	Director	Ref.
1991	Dios los cría	—	Fernando Ayala	
1991	La plaga	La mujer rata	Luis Puenzo	

== See also ==
- List of transgender people
- LGBT in Argentina
- Transgender rights in Argentina
