= Revue =

Theatrical act with music, dance, and sketches

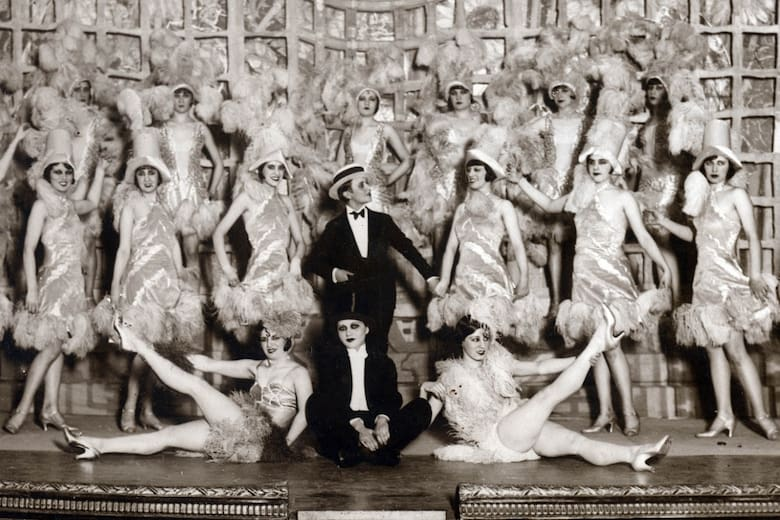
A revista porteña (Buenos Aires revue) show in the 1920s.

A revue is a type of multi-act popular theatrical entertainment that combines music, dance, and sketches. The revue has its roots in 19th century popular entertainment and melodrama but grew into a substantial cultural presence of its own during its golden years from 1916 to 1932. Though most famous for their visual spectacle, revues frequently satirized contemporary figures, news or literature. Similar to the related subforms of operetta and musical theatre, the revue art form brings together music, dance and sketches to create a compelling show. In contrast to these, however, revue does not have an overarching storyline. Rather, a general theme serves as the motto for a loosely related series of acts that alternate between solo performances and dance ensembles.

Owing to high ticket prices, ribald publicity campaigns, and the occasional use of prurient material, the revue was typically patronized by audience members who earned more and felt even less restricted by middle-class social norms than their contemporaries in vaudeville. Like much of that era's popular entertainments, revues often featured material based on sophisticated, irreverent dissections of topical matter, public personae and fads, though the primary attraction was found in the frank display of the female body.

The genre was widely popular in Argentina, where it took the form of the revista porteña and led the Buenos Aires theater circuit for much of the 20th century.

== Etymology ==
Revue comes from the French word for review, as in a "show presenting a review of current events".

George Lederer's The Passing Show (1894) is usually held to be the first successful American "review". The English spelling was used until 1907 when Florenz Ziegfeld Jr. popularized the French spelling. "Follies" is now sometimes (incorrectly) employed as an analog for "revue", though the term was proprietary to Ziegfeld until his death in 1932. Other popular proprietary revue names included George White's "Scandals", Earl Carroll's "Vanities" and John Murray Anderson's Greenwich Village Follies.

== Origin ==
Revues are most properly understood as having amalgamated several theatrical traditions within the corpus of a single entertainment. Minstrelsy's olio section provided a structural map of popular variety presentation, while literary travesties highlighted an audience hunger for satire. Theatrical extravaganzas, in particular, moving panoramas, demonstrated a vocabulary of the spectacular. Burlesque, itself a bawdy hybrid of various theatrical forms, lent to classic revue an open interest in female sexuality and the masculine gaze.

== Golden age ==
Revues enjoyed great success on Broadway from the World War I years until the Great Depression, when the stock market crash forced many revues from cavernous Broadway houses into smaller venues. (The shows did, however, continue to infrequently appear in large theatres well into the 1950s.) The high ticket prices of many revues helped ensure audiences distinct from other live popular entertainments during their height of popularity (late 1910s–1940s). In 1914, the Follies charged $5.00 for an opening night ticket ($130 in 2020 dollars); at that time, many cinema houses charged from $0.10 to 0.25, while low-priced vaudeville seats were $0.15. Among the many popular producers of revues, Florenz Ziegfeld played the greatest role in developing the classical revue through his glorification of a new theatrical "type", "the American girl". Famed for his often bizarre publicity schemes and continual debt, Ziegfeld joined Earl Carroll, George White, John Murray Anderson, and the Shubert Brothers as the leading producing figure of the American revue's golden age. Revues also had a presence in Germany during the 1930s and 1940s, with films such as "Frau meiner Träume" being made.

Revues took advantage of their high revenue stream to lure away performers from other media, often offering exorbitant weekly salaries without the unremitting travel demanded by other entertainments. Performers such as Eddie Cantor, Anna Held, W. C. Fields, Bert Williams, Ed Wynn, the Marx Brothers and the Fairbanks Twins found great success on the revue stage. One of Cole Porter's early shows was Raymond Hitchcock's revue Hitchy-Koo of 1919. Composers or lyricists such as Richard Rodgers, Lorenz Hart, Irving Berlin, and George M. Cohan also enjoyed a tremendous reception on the part of audiences. Sometimes, an appearance in a revue provided a key early entry into entertainment. Largely due to their centralization in New York City and their adroit use of publicity, revues proved particularly adept at introducing new talents to the American theatre. Rodgers and Hart, one of the great composer/lyricist teams of the American musical theatre, followed up their early Columbia University student revues with the successful Garrick Gaieties (1925). Comedian Fanny Brice, following a brief period in burlesque and amateur variety, bowed to revue audiences in Ziegfeld's Follies of 1910. Specialist writers and composers of revues have included Sandy Wilson, Noël Coward, John Stromberg, George Gershwin, Earl Carroll, and the British team Flanders and Swann. In Britain predominantly, Tom Arnold also specialized in promoting series of revues and his acts extended to the European continent and South Africa.

== Film revues ==
With the introduction of talking pictures, in 1927, studios immediately began filming acts from the stage. Such film shorts gradually replaced the live entertainment that had often accompanied cinema exhibition. By 1928, studios began planning to film feature-length versions of popular musicals and revues from the stage. The lavish films, noted by many for a sustained opulence unrivaled in Hollywood until the 1950s epics, reached a breadth of audience never found by the stage revue, all while significantly underpricing the now-faltering theatrical shows. A number of revues were released by the studios, many of which were filmed entirely (or partly) in color. The most notable examples of these are The Show of Shows (Warner Brothers, 1929), The Hollywood Revue of 1929 (Metro-Goldwyn-Mayer, 1929), Fox Movietone Follies of 1929 (Fox Film Corporation, 1929), Paramount on Parade (Paramount, 1930), New Movietone Follies of 1930 (Fox, 1930), and King of Jazz (Universal, 1930). Even Britain jumped on the bandwagon and produced expensive revues such as Harmony Heaven (British International Pictures, 1929), Elstree Calling (BIP, 1930), and The Musical Revue Of 1959 (BI P, 1960).

== Contemporary revues ==
Revues are often common today as student entertainment (with strong traditions in many universities in UK, Canada, Australia, New Zealand, Norway, Sweden, Finland and Denmark). In the latter famously the revue on the Institute of Political Science at the University of Copenhagen. These use pastiche, in which contemporary songs are re-written in order to comment on the college or courses in a humorous nature. While most comic songs will only be heard within the revue they were written for, sometimes they become more widely known—such as "A Transport of Delight", about the big red London bus, by Flanders and Swann, who first made their name in a revue titled At the Drop of a Hat.

The Rolling Thunder Revue was a famed U.S. concert tour in the mid-1970s consisting of a traveling caravan of musicians, headed by Bob Dylan, that took place in late 1975 and early 1976.

Towards the end of the 20th century, a subgenre of revue largely dispensed with the sketches, founding narrative structure within a song cycle in which the material is culled from varied works. This type of revue may or may not have identifiable characters and a rudimentary storyline but, even when it does, the songs remain the focus of the show (for example, Closer Than Ever by Richard Maltby Jr. and David Shire). This type of revue usually showcases songs written by a particular composer or songs made famous by a particular performer. Examples of the former are Side By Side By Sondheim (music/lyrics Stephen Sondheim), Eubie! (Eubie Blake), Tom Foolery (Tom Lehrer), and Five Guys Named Moe (songs made popular by Louis Jordan). The eponymous nature of these later revues suggest a continued embrace of a unifying authorial presence in this seemingly scattershot genre, much as was earlier the case with Ziegfeld, Carrol, et al.

With different artistic emphases, the revue genre is today above all upheld at traditional variety theatres such as the Le Lido, Moulin Rouge, and Friedrichstadt-Palast Berlin, as well as shows in Las Vegas.

== University and Medics' Revues ==
It is a current and longstanding tradition of medical, dental, engineering, legal and veterinary schools within the UK, Canada, New Zealand and Australia to stage revues each year, combining comedy sketches, songs, parodies, films and sound-bites. As well as performing at their home universities, British revues are sometimes also performed at festivals such as the Edinburgh Festival Fringe.

=== United Hospitals Comedy Revue - The Moira Stuart Cup ===
The Moira Stuart Cup is competed for annually at the United Hospitals Comedy Revue, by all five of the University of London Medical Schools. It has been won by all medical schools at least once, with St George's Hospital Medical School achieving the most victories, winning the trophy seven times. The cup is not officially endorsed by Moira Stuart herself.

Year	Winner	Location
2026	Malignant Humours (St George's Hospital Medical School)	The Dragon Bar, St George's Hospital Medical School
2025	The Zebraphiles (Barts and The London School of Medicine and Dentistry)	Metric Bar, Imperial College London (hosted by ICSM)
2024	The MDs Comedy Revue (RUMS)	St. George's Hospital Medical School Bar, St George's Hospital Medical School
2023	The Zebraphiles (Barts and The London School of Medicine and Dentistry) Feat. Emma Walker of BSMS	St. George's Hospital Medical School Bar, St George's Hospital Medical School
2022	Malignant Humours (St George's Hospital Medical School)	Laird Hall, Whitechapel (hosted by Barts and The London)
2021	N/A	No event held due to the COVID-19 pandemic in the United Kingdom
2020	The Zebraphiles (Barts and The London School of Medicine and Dentistry)	Brian Drewe Lecture Theatre, Imperial College London (hosted by ICSM)
2019	See Note^{[a]}	Bush House, King's College London (hosted by GKT)
2018	The Zebraphiles (Barts and The London School of Medicine and Dentistry)	Peter Samuel Hall, Royal Free Hospital (hosted by RUMS)
2017	The MDs Comedy Revue (RUMS)	Monckton Theatre, St George's Hospital Medical School
2016	The MDs Comedy Revue (RUMS)	Genesis Cinema, Whitechapel (hosted by Barts and The London)
2015	The MDs Comedy Revue (RUMS)	Monckton Theatre, St George's Hospital Medical School
2014	The MDs Comedy Revue (RUMS)	Monckton Theatre, St George's Hospital Medical School
2013	GKT School of Medicine	Greenwood Theatre, King's College London (hosted by GKT)
2012	Malignant Humours (St George's Hospital Medical School)	Monckton Theatre, St George's Hospital Medical School
2011	Malignant Humours (St George's Hospital Medical School)	Great Hall, Sherfield Building, Imperial College London (hosted by ICSM)
2010	GKT School of Medicine feat. Tim Jackson and Sam Haddad of BSMS	Greenwood Theatre, King's College London (hosted by GKT)
2009	The MDs Comedy Revue (RUMS)	Peter Samuel Hall, Royal Free Hospital (hosted by RUMS)
2008	GKT School of Medicine	Monckton Theatre, St George's Hospital Medical School
2007	Imperial College School of Medicine	Peter Samuel Hall, Royal Free Hospital (hosted by RUMS)
2006	GKT School of Medicine	Greenwood Theatre, King's College London (hosted by GKT)
2005	Malignant Humours (St George's Hospital Medical School)	Bloomsbury Theatre, University College London (hosted by RUMS)
2004	Malignant Humours (St George's Hospital Medical School)	Bloomsbury Theatre, University College London (hosted by RUMS)
2003	Malignant Humours (St George's Hospital Medical School)	Bloomsbury Theatre, University College London (hosted by RUMS)
2002	N/A^{[b]}	Tommy's Bar, King's College London (hosted by GKT)

a. In 2019, the judges ironically declared Imperial College School of Medicine the winners, because they could not decide which of The MDs Comedy Revue or The Zebraphiles were the funnier.

b. The 2002 UH Revue was a showcase of each Medical School's Revue societies, with the competition element brought in from 2003.

== See also ==
- Cabaret
- Wayne Lamb
- Capping Show
- Revue Studios

== Bibliography ==
- Davis, Lee (2000). Scandals and Follies: The Rise and Fall of the Great Broadway Revue. Proscenium Publishers Inc., New York. ISBN 0-87910-274-8.
