= Nélida Roca =

Argentine vedette

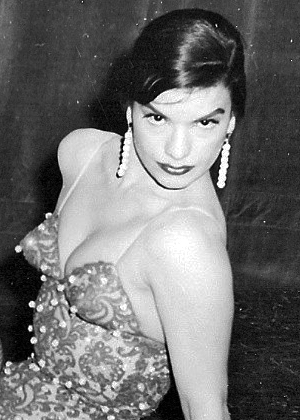
- Nélida Roca c. 1950s
- Born: Nélida Mercedes Musso; May 30, 1929; Buenos Aires, Argentina
- Died: December 4, 1999 (aged 70); Buenos Aires, Argentina
- Occupations: Supervedette - actress, dancer, singer, model
- Years active: 1947–1974 (The Golden Revue)
- Spouses: Julio Rivera Roca (m. 1949–1962) Ricky Giuliano (m. 1963–1969)

Nélida Roca (Spanish pronunciation: [ˈneliða ˈroka]; May 30, 1929 – December 4, 1999) was an Argentine vedette in the revista porteña, i. e., Buenos Aires revue, a leading sex symbol of midcentury Argentina.

Born Nélida Mercedes Musso in Buenos Aires, her friends and colleagues fondly called her La Roca ("The Rock"). From childhood, she sought to become a famous artist, but had to confront her parents' strong opposition to the idea. Her mother was from the Galicia region of Spain, and her father was an Italian man from Genoa.

Nélida married Julio Rivera Roca, a jazz piano player, in 1949, which got her to complete her dream as the lead vocalist in his orchestra. She was discovered in 1950, during one such performance, by Luis César Amadori, owner of the Maipó Theatre, and first starred on the professional stage in Amadori's The Maipó Theatre is Telling its Stories. The show's commercial success allowed Amadori to triple the price of the seats, and she became a legend in her genre during the 1950s. Critics and her public came to know her as "The Venus of Corrientes Avenue" (the Buenos Aires theatre district).

She remarried in 1963 with vocalist Aldo Perricone (known by his stage name, Ricky Giuliano), though the marriage ended in 1969. In her last show, in the winter of 1974, she shared top credits with the then up-and-coming star, Susana Giménez. The show, The Golden Revue, her last performance, dealt with cultural changes in Argentina over the years.

== Death ==
She died of a heart attack in December 1999, at age 70.

== Sources ==
- Clarín: Murió Nélida Roca, la reina de la revista porteña (in Spanish)
- La Nación: Nélida Roca, adiós a un mito porteño (in Spanish)
- Maipó Theatre: Nélida Roca (in Spanish)
