= Porteño (Argentina) =

Demonym for the city of Buenos Aires

Porteño (feminine: Porteña; lit. 'port city person' in Spanish) is the demonym used for people from the city (but not the province) of Buenos Aires, Argentina.

== History ==
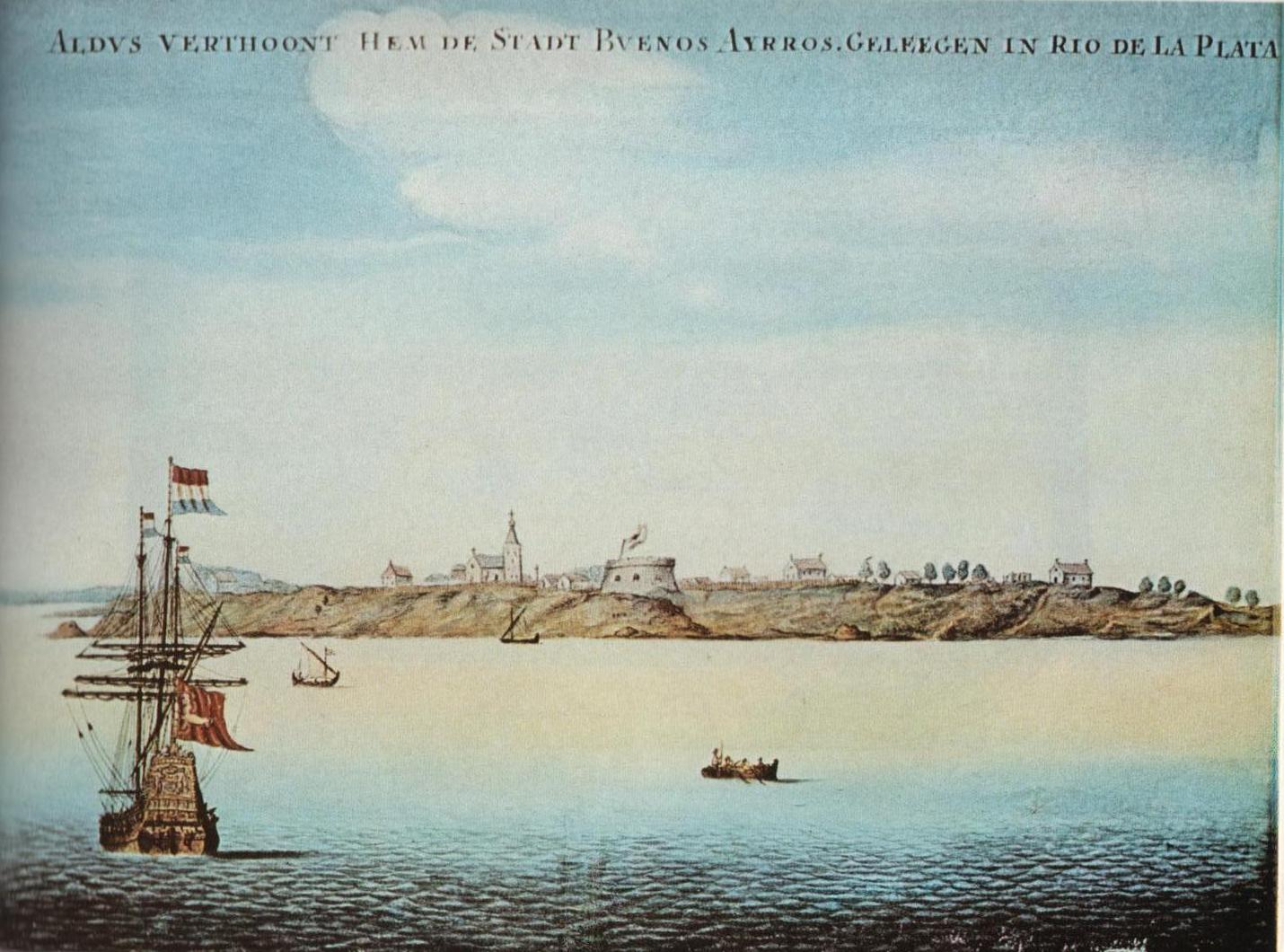
Buenos Aires, 1628

The demonym has long been used to refer to the inhabitants of the city of Buenos Aires, refounded in 1580 as Ciudad de la Trinidad, Puerto de Santa María de los Buenos Ayres. It is generally used in the Spanish-speaking world to refer to the inhabitants of various port cities, as is the case with the city of Buenos Aires in Argentina, as well as Valparaíso, Chile, Puerto Carreño, Colombia, and Puerto Cabello, Venezuela. In the case of the city of Buenos Aires, it has been suggested that its use alludes to the fact that historically several of its inhabitants arrived there by ship from Europe.

With the nearby rural territory sparsely populated and dependent on the capital, the usage extended to its inhabitants. After independence, it was even common among foreigners to use the word "porteño" as a synonym for "Argentine."

Until the first decades of the 19th century, the word "Argentine" was in fact a synonym for "porteño," an adjective used to refer to anything related to the Río de la Plata or the City of Buenos Aires, which extended to the territories that administratively depended on this city, which were called "Argentine provinces."

However, in the other provinces, the demonym "Argentine" was adopted, especially after the General Congress of 1824. Nevertheless, even in 1839, some restricted the scope of the demonym "Argentine" to residents of Buenos Aires, although this aroused indignation among the provincials who had adopted it, as can be seen in the Memoirs of General José María Paz of Córdoba. The same did not happen with the term "porteño" (resident of Buenos Aires), and the early civil conflicts, largely focused on resistance to the attempts by the city of Buenos Aires to hegemonize political and economic power in the new nation, did not contribute to this. The dichotomy between "porteño" and "provinciano" (resident of Buenos Aires) and between the city of Buenos Aires and the interior of the country became key in Argentine politics and culture, especially during the Directory period and after the establishment of the State of Buenos Aires.

In the province of Buenos Aires, the term continued to be used both for the inhabitants of the city of Buenos Aires and for the inhabitants of the towns and rural areas (inhabitants of "the countryside") of the various territories under the control of the city of Buenos Aires. After Juan Manuel de Rosas 's expedition against the indigenous tribes, the list of rescued captives curiously classifies them all as "porteños," specifying the town afterward. Thus, one is a "porteño from Lobos," another a "porteño from Dolores," and yet another a "porteño from Salto." There is also a "porteña from Pergamino."

Following the failure of the 1880 Revolution and the federalization of the city of Buenos Aires, which became the capital of the Republic and was politically separated from the rest of the province, the term "porteño" was used for the inhabitants of that city and "bonaerense" for the inhabitants of the now separate province of Buenos Aires.

The word *porteño* already appears in the 1884 edition of the Dictionary of the Royal Spanish Academy (DRAE) , defined as "Native of El Puerto de Santa María. Used // Belonging to this city ." This can refer to an inhabitant of El Puerto de Santa María de los Buenos Aires, but also to someone from El Puerto de Santa María (Cádiz). The 1899 edition of the Dictionary of the Royal Spanish Academy (DRAE) (p. 851.3) adds the meaning *bonaerense *, and only in the 1970 edition (p. 1051.2) is it clearly specified as belonging to or relating to the city of the Holy Trinity and El Puerto de Santa María de los Buenos Aires. It is only in the 1984 edition of the DRAE (p. 1089.2), recognizing the use of the demonym in other towns, that it is defined as: Applied to natives of various cities in Spain and America that have ports. // By antonomasia. Native of El Puerto de Santa María. Belonging to or relating to the city of the Holy Trinity and Port of Santa María de los Buenos Aires de Argentina, today Buenos Aires.//Native of Valparaíso. utcs//Native of Puerto Carreño.

== Culture ==
Equestrian sports are a huge part of Porteño life. Buenos Aires produces some of the best polo players in the world, due to the high quality of ponies raised throughout the fertile grasslands in the Pampas region and the enthusiastic sponsorship of the sport by Argentina's land-owning elites. Each year, in November, the Palermo Open, the world's most prestigious polo championship, takes place in the Palermo section of Buenos Aires.

Porteño cuisine consists heavily of beef that is available in abundance owing to the geography of the Pampas that lends itself to cattle raising.

== Demographics ==
Since Porteño is not officially reportable on any census, estimates differ regarding their population and geography. While not the majority ethnicity in Argentina, Porteños are prominent in the eastern province of Buenos Aires.
