= Nelida Lobato =

Argentine actress (1934–1982)

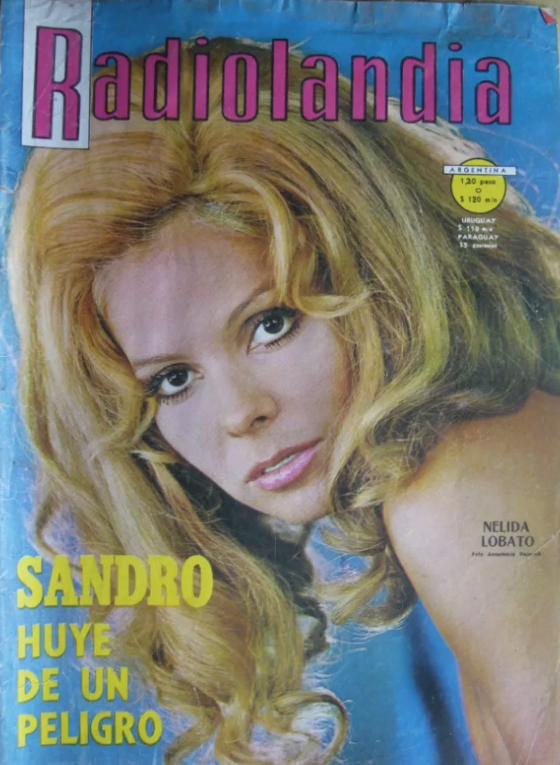
- Lobato on the cover of magazine Radiolandia, by photographer Annemarie Heinrich, 1972.
- Born: Haydée Nélida Menta; 19 June 1934; Buenos Aires, Argentina
- Died: 9 May 1982 (aged 47); Buenos Aires, Argentina
- Occupations: Dancer, actress
- Spouse: Eber Lobato (m. 1955; div. 1962)
- Partner: Víctor Laplace
- Relatives: Lenny Lobato (grandson)

Nélida Lobato, born Haydée Nélida Menta (Spanish pronunciation: [ˈneliða loˈβato]; 19 June 1934 – 9 May 1982), was one of the most popular vedettes of Argentine revue during the 1960s and 1970s.

== Career ==
She began her career aged 18 dancing on LR3 Radio Belgrano Televisión. Later she appeared at the Bim-Bam-Bum Theatre in Santiago, Chile. In 1955, she was a ballet dancer in Alfredo Alaria dance company. Fifteen days after starting dancing with Eber Lobato, he asked to marry her. Eber became a choreographer and began to improve her career.

She starred at the Lido de Paris, France in Champs-Élysées, after appearing in Las Vegas, where her show lasted almost five years. In Buenos Aires, she starred in several "revistas" (variety shows) and played 'Roxie Hart' in the original Buenos Aires version of the musical Chicago.

In 1965, she starred in the 1964 exploitation film Scream of the Butterfly directed by Eber Lobato, co starring Mary Leona Gage, Nick Novarro and Richard Beebe.

== Personal life ==
She separated from Eber Lobato in 1962, after she had suffered a miscarriage. They carried on working together until 1967, when he remarried. She later became the partner of Argentinian film actor Víctor Laplace, and accompanied him into exile when he left Buenos Aires, after being threatened by the Triple A.

Lobato's grandson, Lenny, is a professional footballer.

Lobato died of cancer in 1982.

== Filmography ==
Film/TV	Year	Note
El Calavera	1954	Argentinian Movie.
El satélite chiflado	1956	Argentinian Movie.
Venga a bailar el rock	1957	Argentinian Movie.
Mientras haya un circo	1958	Argentinian and Chilean film production.
Nubes de humo	1959	Argentinian and Peruvian film.
Historia de jóvenes	1959	Argentinian television.
Andy Rusell Show	1960	USA television.
El show de Antonio Prieto	1961	Argentinian television.
Sábados Gigantes	1964	Chilean television.
Scream of the Butterfly	1965	USA film, with Nick Novarro, Richard Beebe, Robert Miller.
Sábados Circulares con Mancera	1966	Argentinian television.
El Show de Nélida Lobato	1969	Chilean television.
Juani en sociedad	1969	Chilean television.
Blum	1970	Argentinian film.
El mundo de Nélida Lobato	1971	Television series.
El mundo del espectáculo	1971	Television programme.
Alta comedia	1971	Television series.
Maipazo	1972	Maipo Theatre, Buenos Aires.
Argentinísima	1972	Argentinian musical film.
Rolando Rivas, taxista	1972	Argentinian telenovela.
Escándalos	1973	El Nacional Theatre, Buenos Aires.
Almorzando con Nélida Lobato	1973	Television programme.
El gran Marrone	1974	Television programme.
Porcelandia	1974	Television programme.
El Maipo... es el Maipo (y el 74 es Nélida Lobato)	1974	Maipo Theatre, Buenos Aires.
Fantástico: O Show Da Vida	1975	Brazilian television.
El show de Eber y Nélida Lobato	1976	Television programme.
La revista de esmeraldas y diamantes	1977	Comedy, with Tato Bores and Moria Casán, Maipo Theatre, Buenos Aires.
Chicago	1977	Musical, with Ambar La Fox, National Theatre, Buenos Aires.
300 millones	1978	Spanish television.
El tío Porcel	1978	Television programme.
La Fiesta de todos	1979	Argentinian movie.
Así como nos ven	1979	Argentinian television comedy series.
Lunes gala	1979	Chilean television.
Segunda Teletón	1979	Chilean television.
Érase otra vez... Nélida Lobato	1980	Teatro Cómico, Buenos Aires.
Konex Platinum award	1981	Awarded Best of Argentinian spectacle.
La gran noche	1981	Chilean television.
Noche de gigantes	1981	Chilean television.
La Mariposa	1982	Maipo Theatre, her last show.
