= Teatro Maipo =

Theatre in Buenos Aires, Argentina

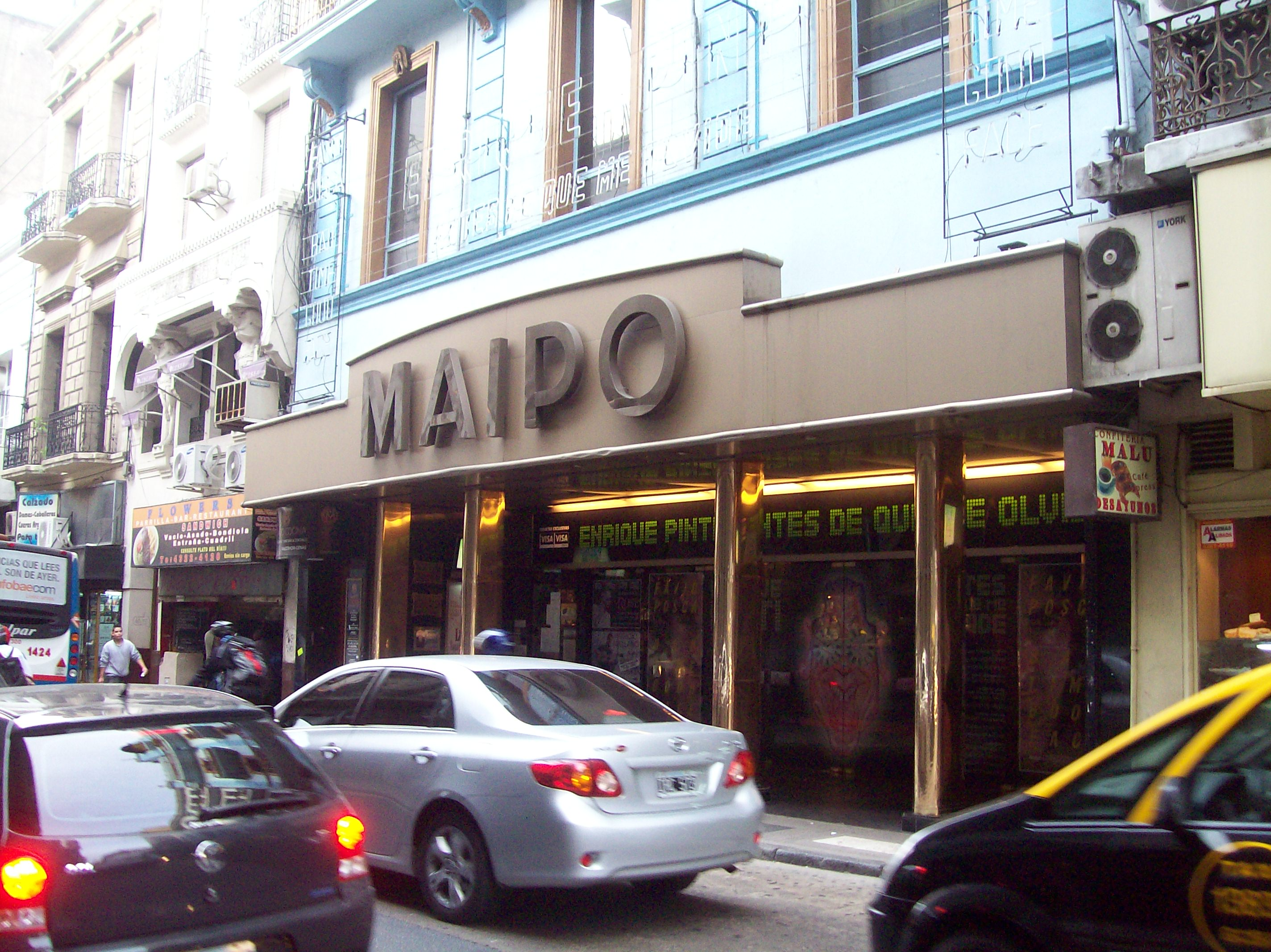
An image of Teatro Maipo theatre

Teatro Maipo is a historic theatre in downtown Buenos Aires, Argentina. It was founded in 1908 by entrepreneur Charles Seguin, and was first called the Scala Theater. It later changed its name to the Esmerelda Theatre and eventually to the Maipo theatre. It has closed and reopened several times, most recently in 1994. The history of the Maipo theatre is the subject of a novel by historian Carlos Schwarzer.

== Notable performers ==
- Teresita Zazá (1893-1980), Spanish tonadillera, cupletista, and actress
