= Vidette =

Vidette may refer to:

Places:

- Vidette, Georgia, United States, a city
- Vidette Township, Fulton County, Arkansas - see Fulton County, Arkansas
- Vidette, British Columbia, Canada, an unincorporated locality
- Vidette Lake, a lake in British Columbia

Ships:

- HMS Vidette (D48), a British destroyer which served in both World Wars
- USCGC Vidette (1919), a US Coast Guard cutter
- USS Vidette (1907) - see List of United States Navy ships: T–V
- Vidette, a Union Navy transport during the American Civil War - see USS Valley City (1859)

Other uses:

- Vidette Ryan (born 1984), South African field hockey player
- The Vidette, a student newspaper of Illinois State University
- Vidette, alternative spelling of Vedette, a mounted sentry
