= Vedette =

Vedette may refer to:

== Military ==
- Vedette (sentry), a cavalry sentry or outpost, or a small naval patrol boat used for scouting
- USS Vedette (1914), a motorboat used as a patrol boat acquired in 1917 and used until 1918
- USS Vedette (SP-163), a yacht used as a patrol vessel from 1917 to 1919

== Other uses ==
- Canadian Vickers Vedette, a Canadian-built biplane flying boat
- Ford Vedette, a Ford France car model from 1948 to 1954
- Simca Vedette, a Simca car model from 1954 to 1961
- Vedette (cabaret), a French term equivalent to lead showgirl or pop icon
- Vedette (album), a 2000 album by Argentine rock group Babasónicos
- Vedette Shapewear, brand name for a manufacturer of shapewear, lingerie, and corsets
- Vedette (horse) (foaled 1854), a British Thoroughbred racehorse that won the 2000 Guineas Stakes and two Doncaster Cups.

== See also ==
- Vidette (disambiguation)
