= West Vidette =

Mountain in the American state of California

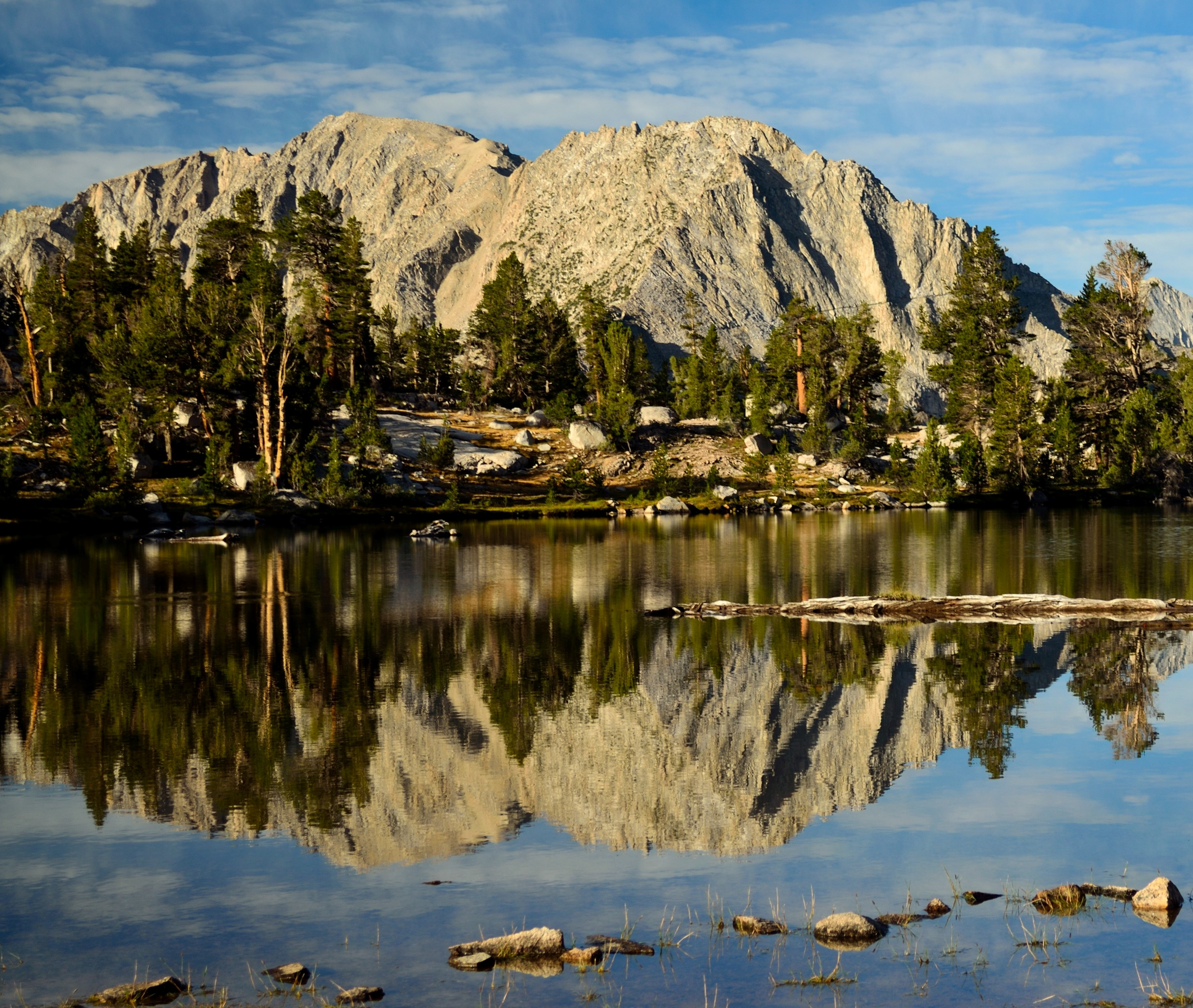
- North aspect, from Bullfrog Lake

Highest point
- Elevation: 12,533 ft (3,820 m)
- Prominence: 230 ft (70 m)
- Parent peak: West Spur (12,700 ft)
- Isolation: 0.52 mi (0.84 km)
- Listing: Sierra Peaks Section
- Coordinates: 36°44′02″N 118°25′11″W

Naming
- Etymology: Vedette

Geography
- Location within California Location within the United States
- Location: Kings Canyon National Park; Tulare County; California, U.S.
- Parent range: Sierra Nevada
- Topo map: USGS Mount Brewer

Climbing
- First ascent: 1926
- Easiest route: class 2 East slope, south ridge

West Vidette is a 12,533-foot-elevation (3,820-meter) mountain summit located three miles west of the crest of the Sierra Nevada mountain range, in the northeast corner of Tulare County in northern California. It is situated in Kings Canyon National Park, 13.5 miles (21.7 km) west-southwest of the community of Independence, and 1.27 miles (2.04 km) west of East Vidette. Topographic relief is significant as the north aspect rises 4,300 feet (1,300 meters) above Junction Meadow in two miles. The John Muir Trail passes below the north aspect of this remote peak. The first ascent of the summit was made September 19, 1926, by Norman Clyde, who is credited with 130 first ascents, most of which were in the Sierra Nevada.

== Etymology ==
Vidette is an alternative spelling of vedette, which is a mounted sentry for bringing information, giving signals, or warnings of danger, to a main body of troops. The pyramid-shaped East Vidette and West Vidette appear to stand guard above a valley, which inspired members of the Sierra Club to name them: "Two of these promontories, standing guard, as it were, the one at the entrance to the valley and the other just within it, form a striking pair, and we named them the Videttes."

== Climate ==
According to the Köppen climate classification system, West Vidette is located in an alpine climate zone. Most weather fronts originate in the Pacific Ocean, and travel east toward the Sierra Nevada mountains. As fronts approach, they are forced upward by the peaks, causing them to drop their moisture in the form of rain or snowfall onto the range (orographic lift). Precipitation runoff from the mountain drains to Bubbs Creek which is a tributary of the South Fork Kings River.

== Gallery ==
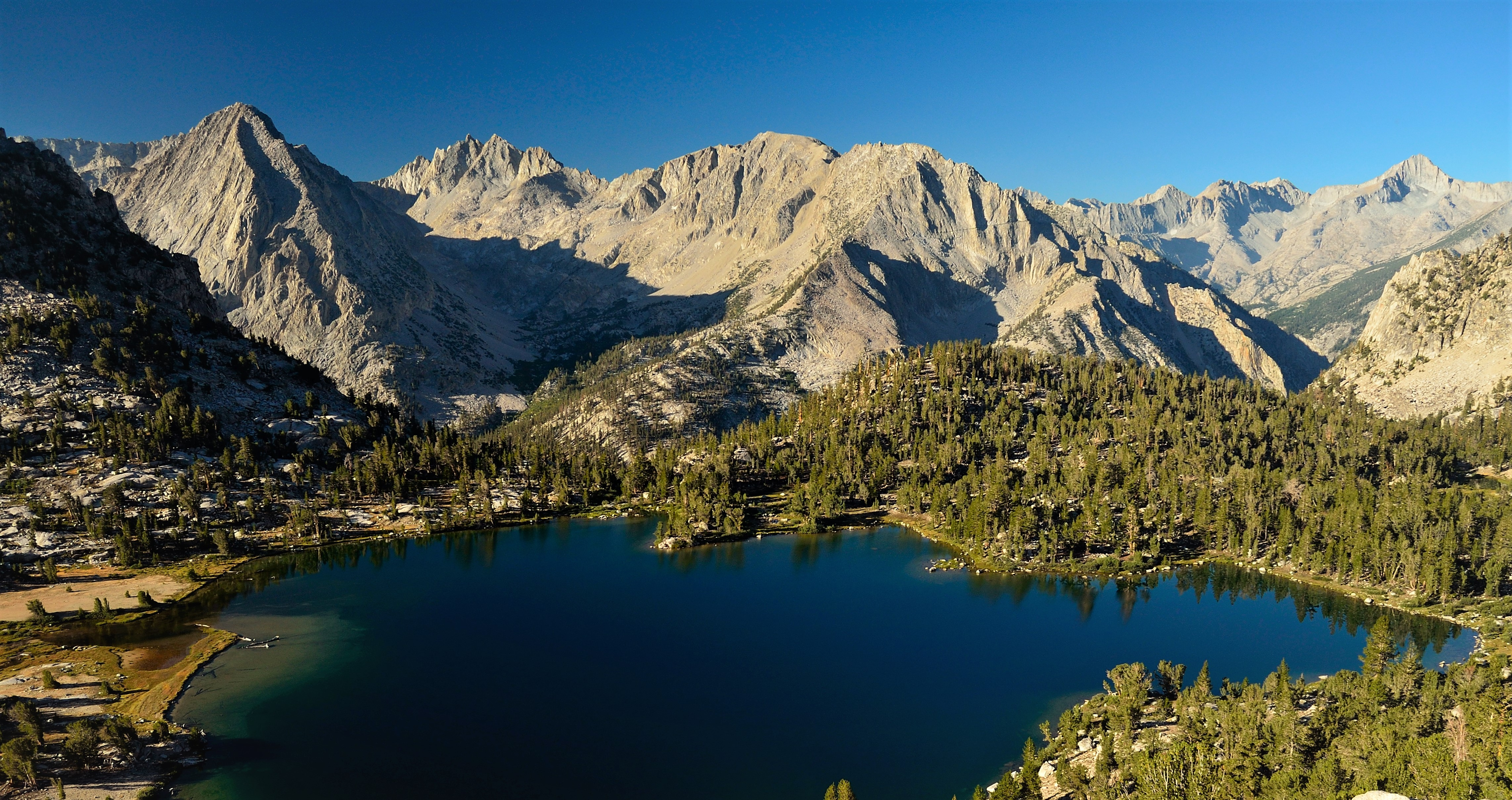
West Vidette centered beyond Bullfrog Lake

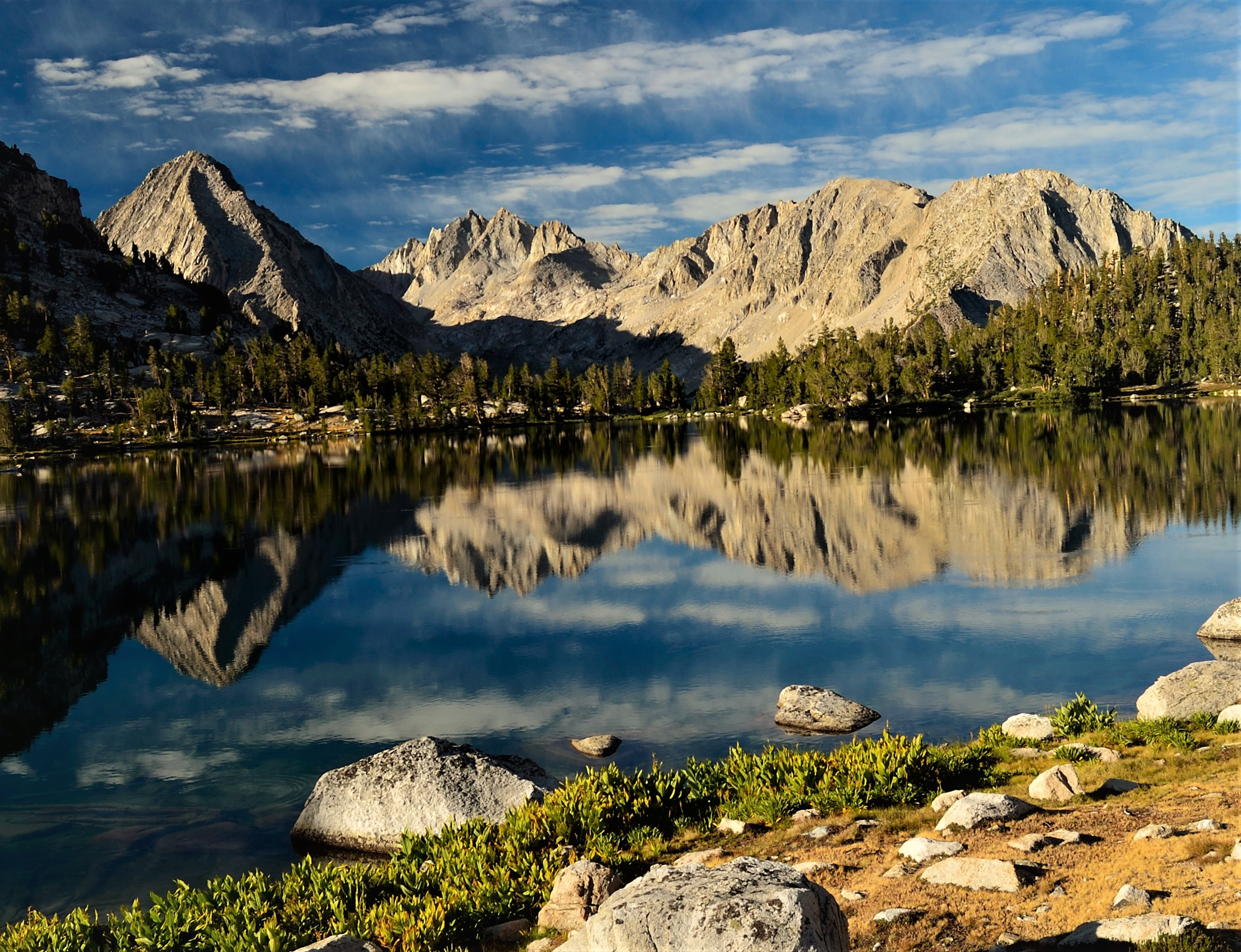
East Vidette, Deerhorn Mountain, and West Vidette, from Bullfrog Lake

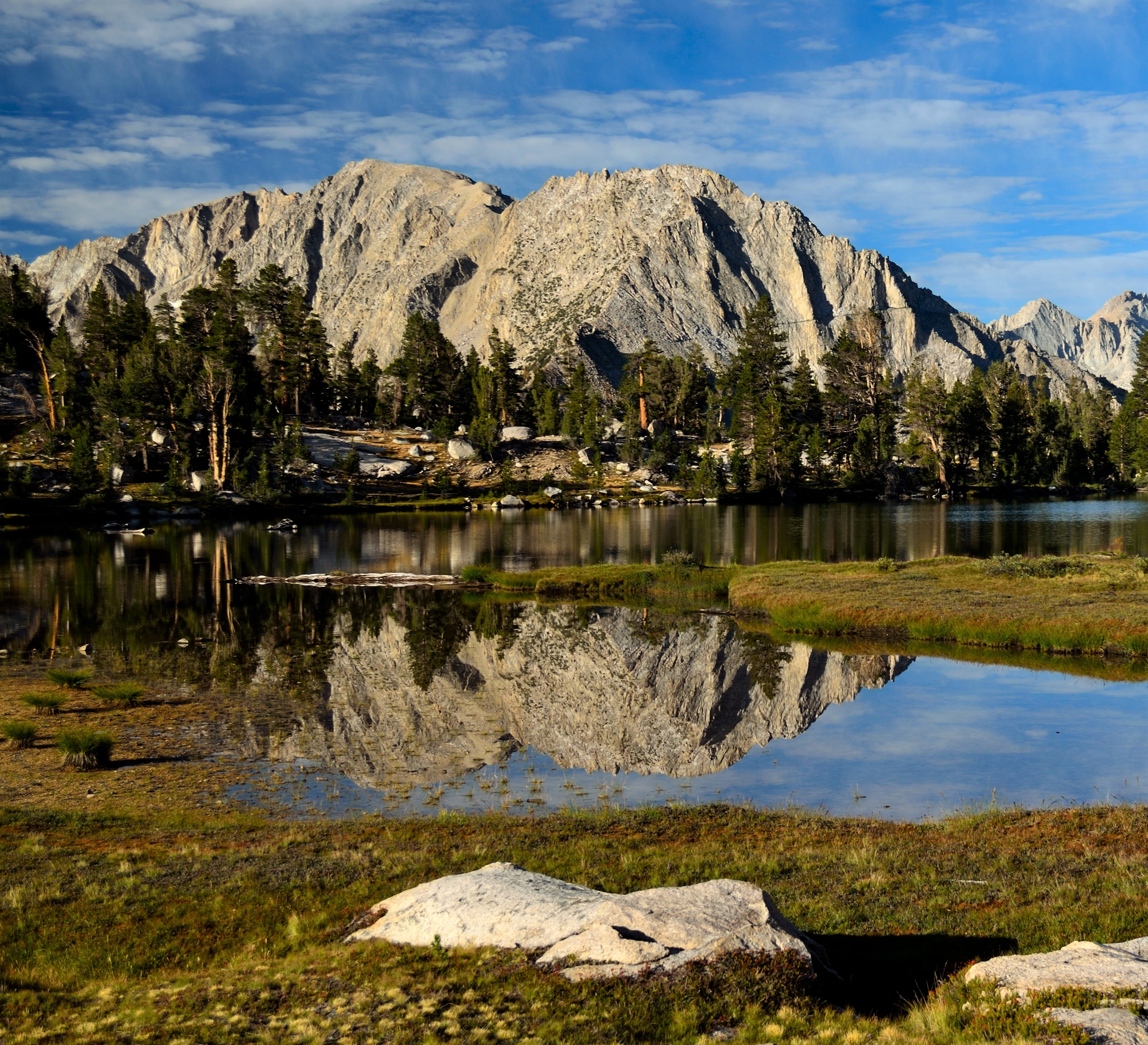
West Vidette reflected in Bullfrog Lake

== See also ==
- East Vidette
- List of mountain peaks of California
