= East Vidette =

Mountain summit of the Sierra Nevada mountain range, in Tulare County, California

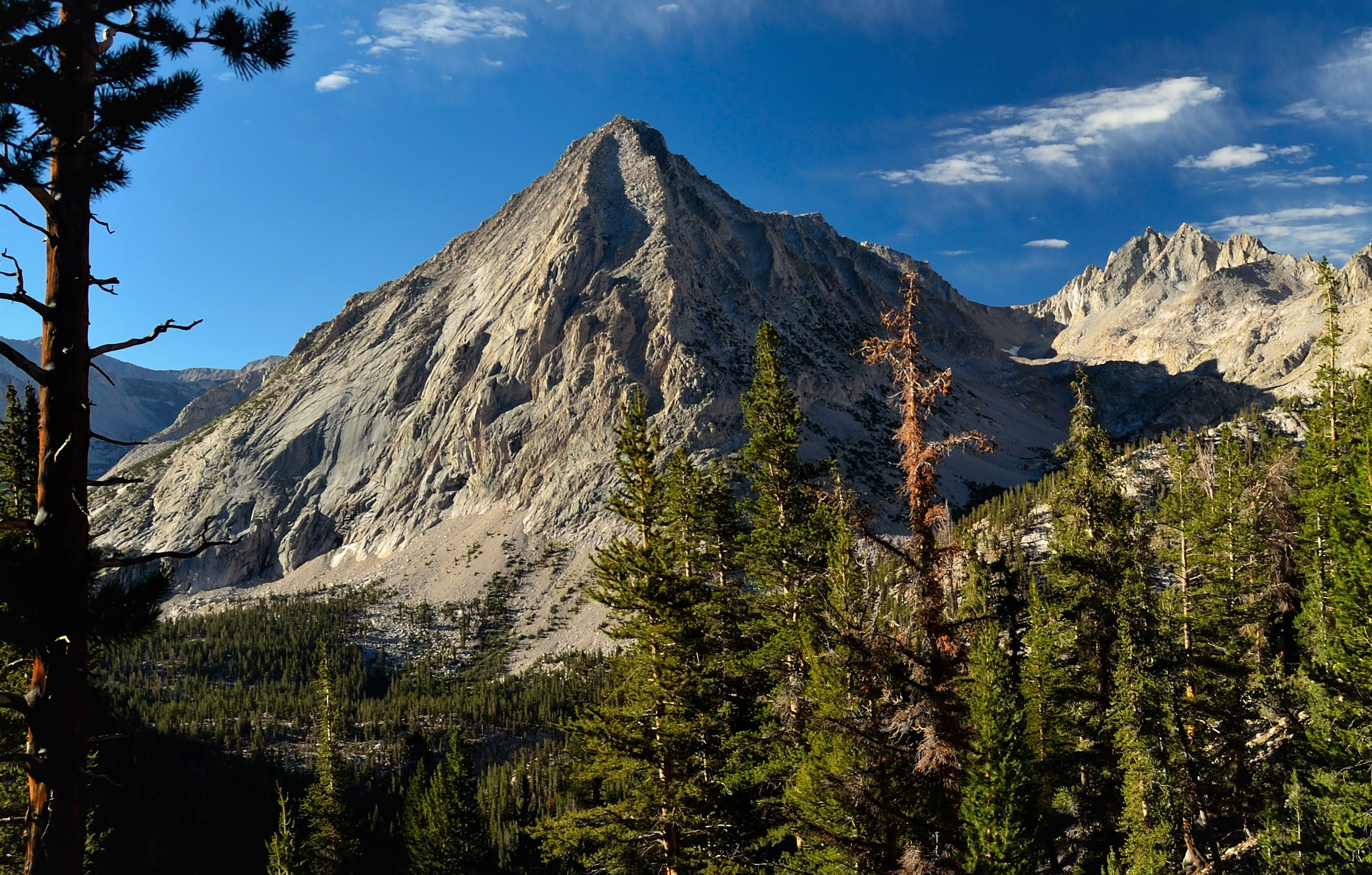
- North aspect

Highest point
- Elevation: 12,356 ft (3,766 m)
- Prominence: 250 ft (76 m)
- Parent peak: East Spur (12,749 ft)
- Isolation: 0.91 mi (1.46 km)
- Listing: Sierra Peaks Section
- Coordinates: 36°44′38″N 118°24′02″W

Naming
- Etymology: Vedette

Geography
- Location within California Location within the United States
- Country: United States
- State: California
- County: Tulare
- Protected area: Kings Canyon National Park
- Parent range: Sierra Nevada
- Topo map: USGS Mount Brewer

Climbing
- First ascent: 1910
- Easiest route: class 3 scrambling

East Vidette is a 12,356-foot-elevation (3,766-meter) mountain summit located two miles west of the crest of the Sierra Nevada mountain range, in the northeast corner of Tulare County in northern California. It is situated in Kings Canyon National Park, 12.5 miles (20.1 km) west-southwest of the community of Independence, and one mile southwest of the Kearsarge Pinnacles. Topographic relief is significant as the north aspect rises nearly 2,800 feet (850 meters) above Vidette Meadow in less than one mile. The John Muir Trail traverses below the north and east aspects of this remote peak. The first ascent of the summit was made in 1910 by a Sierra Club party via the East Ridge.

== Etymology ==
Vidette is an alternative spelling of vedette, which is a mounted sentry for bringing information, giving signals, or warnings of danger, to a main body of troops. The pyramid-shaped East Vidette appears to stand guard above a valley, which inspired members of the Sierra Club to name it: "Two of these promontories, standing guard, as it were, the one at the entrance to the valley and the other just within it, form a striking pair, and we named them the Videttes."

== Climate ==
According to the Köppen climate classification system, East Vidette is located in an alpine climate zone. Most weather fronts originate in the Pacific Ocean, and travel east toward the Sierra Nevada mountains. As fronts approach, they are forced upward by the peaks, causing them to drop their moisture in the form of rain or snowfall onto the range (orographic lift). Precipitation runoff from the mountain drains into Bubbs Creek, a tributary of the South Fork Kings River.

== Gallery ==
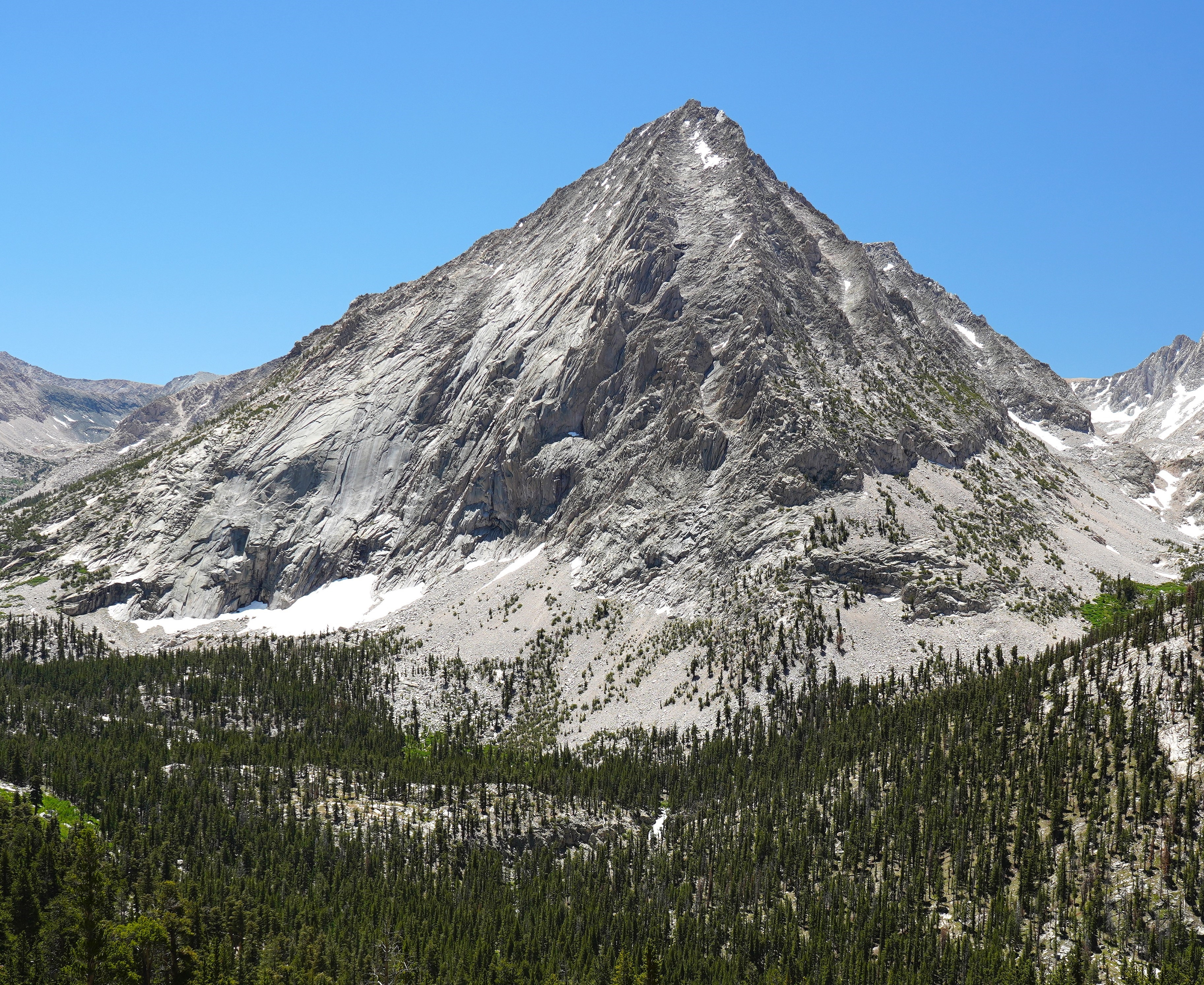
North aspect

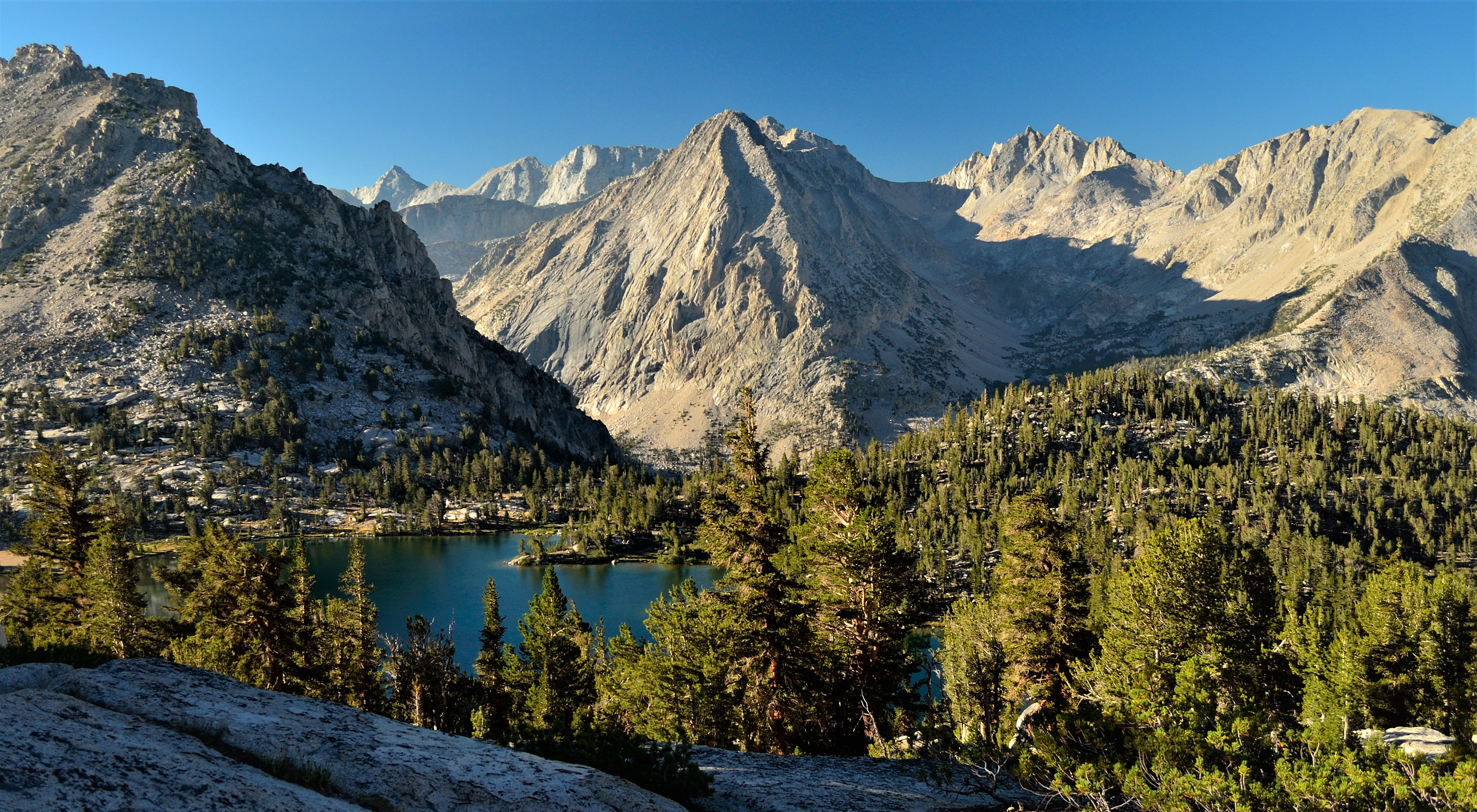
East Vidette centered beyond Bullfrog Lake

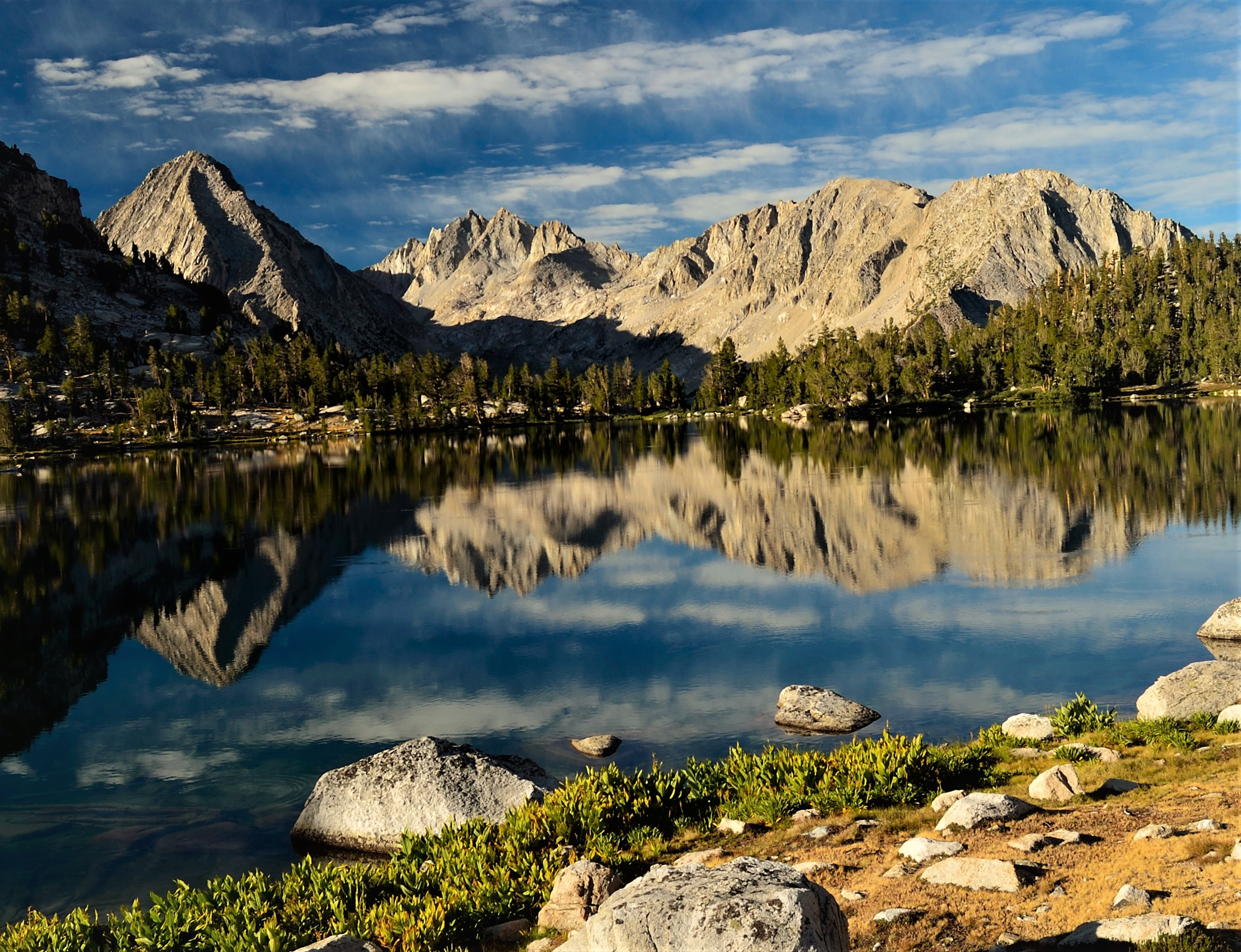
East Vidette, Deerhorn Mountain, West Vidette, from Bullfrog Lake

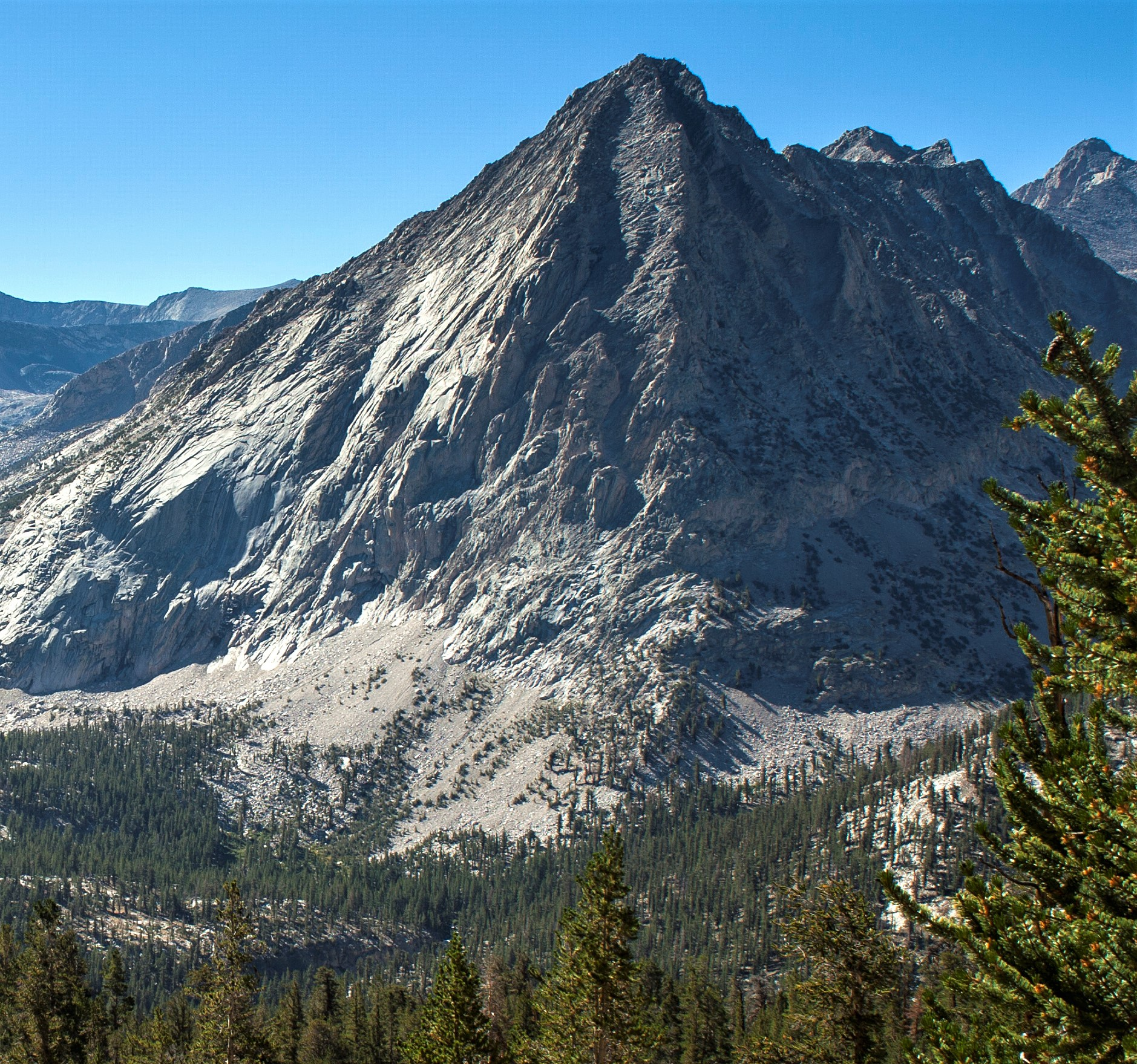
East Vidette from NNW

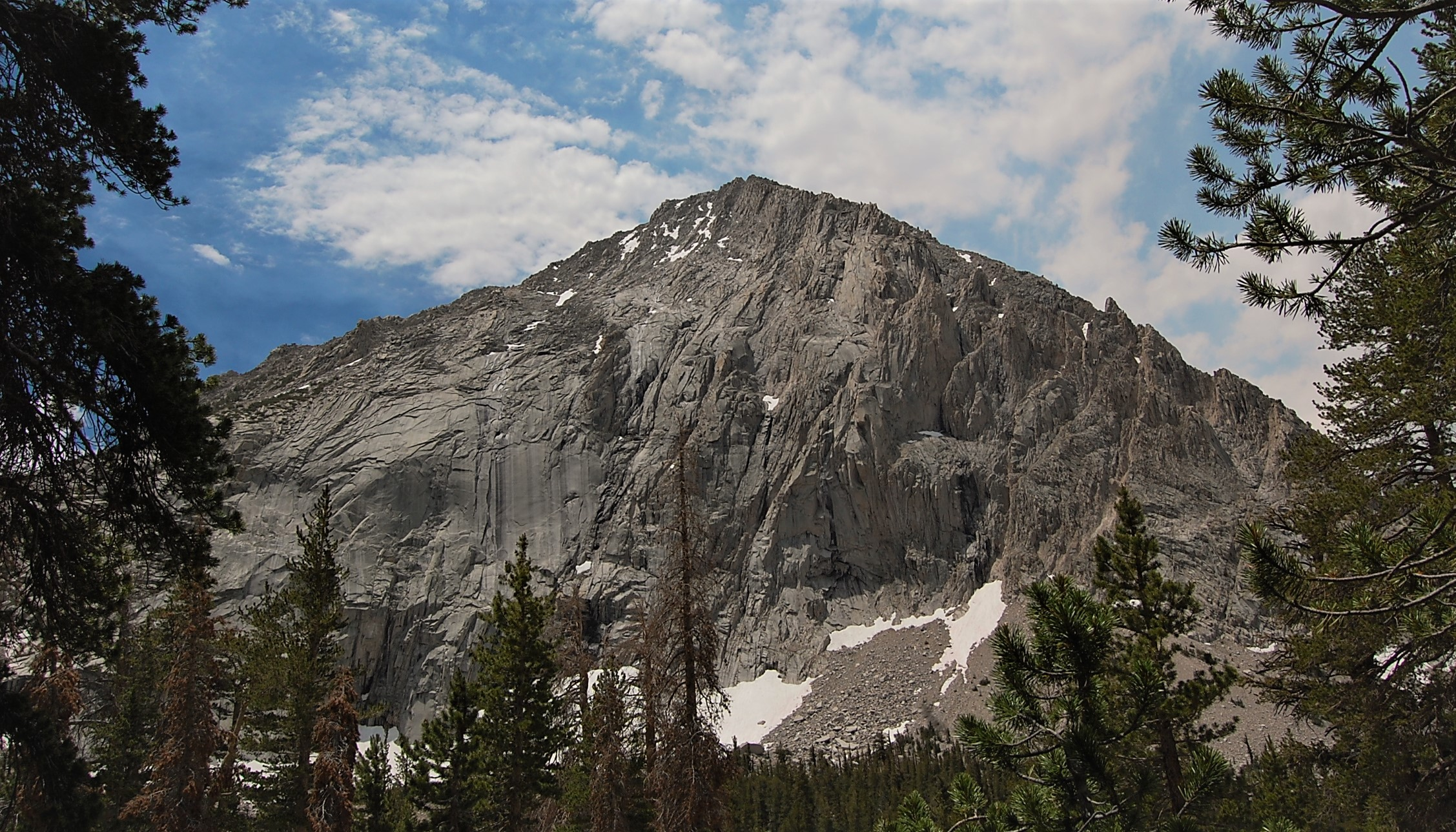
Northeast aspect

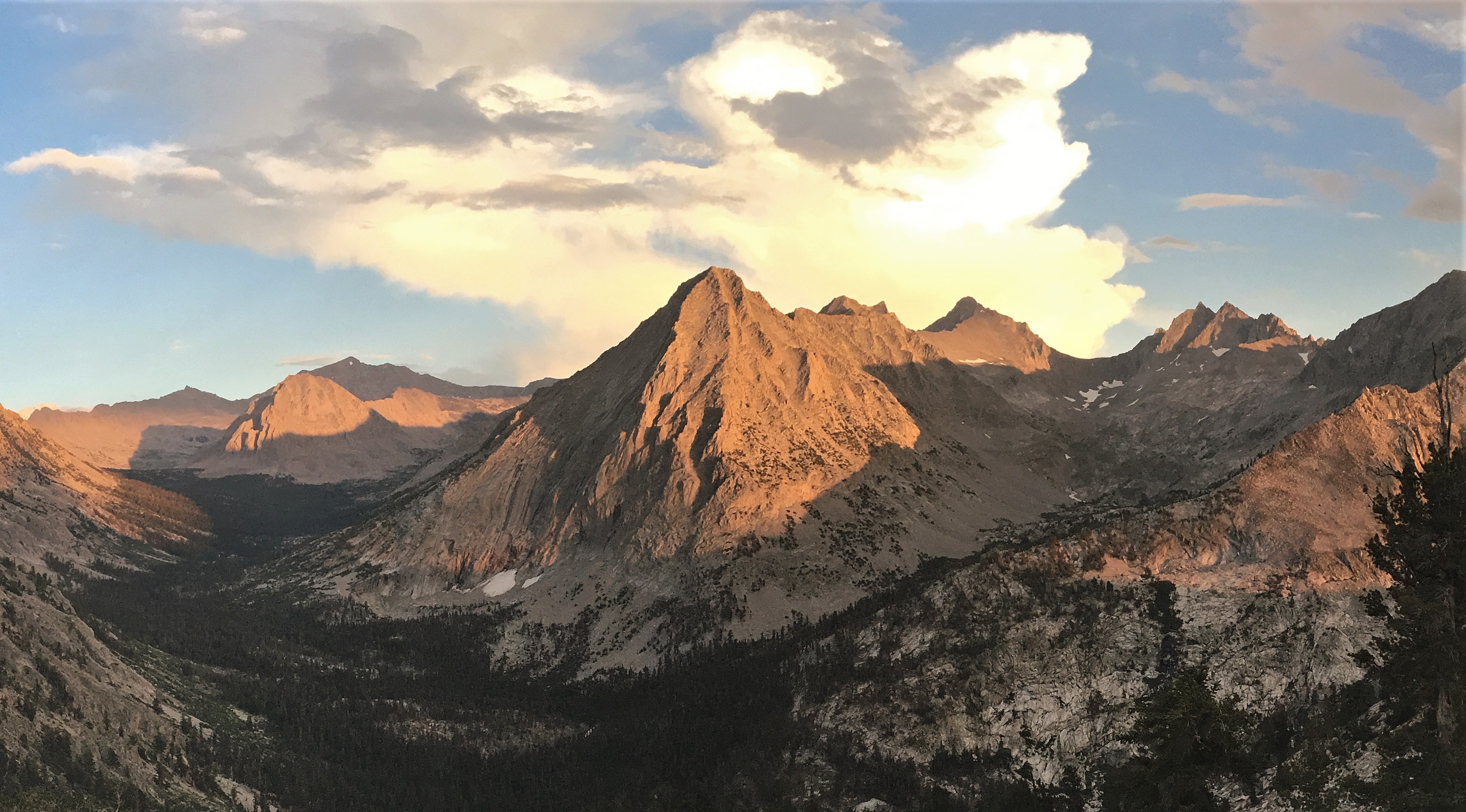
Northwest aspect

== See also ==
- West Vidette
- List of mountain peaks of California
