= Gogó Rojo =

Argentine actress (1942–2021)

Gogó Rojo (née Gladys del Valle Rojo Castro; 7 December 1942 – 26 July 2021) was an Argentine vedette, actress and dancer. She was the younger sister of the actress Ethel Rojo. She appeared in Maridos en Vacaciones, The Sadistic Baron Von Klaus (1962) by Jess Franco and Hay Que Romper la Rutina with Alberto Olmedo.

== Filmography ==
- 1962: The Sadistic Baron Von Klaus
- 1962: Mi adorable esclava
- 1963: Esa pícara pelirroja
- 1965: Whisky y vodka
- 1969: Cry Chicago
- 1970: Crimen imperfecto
- 1971: El apartamento de la tentación
- 1972: La cera virgen
- 1972: Alta tensión
- 1973: Casa Flora
- 1974: Los amantes de la isla del diablo
- 1974: Los caballeros del botón de ancla
- 1974: Hay que romper la rutina
- 1975: Maridos en vacaciones
