= Ethel Rojo =

Argentine actress and vedette

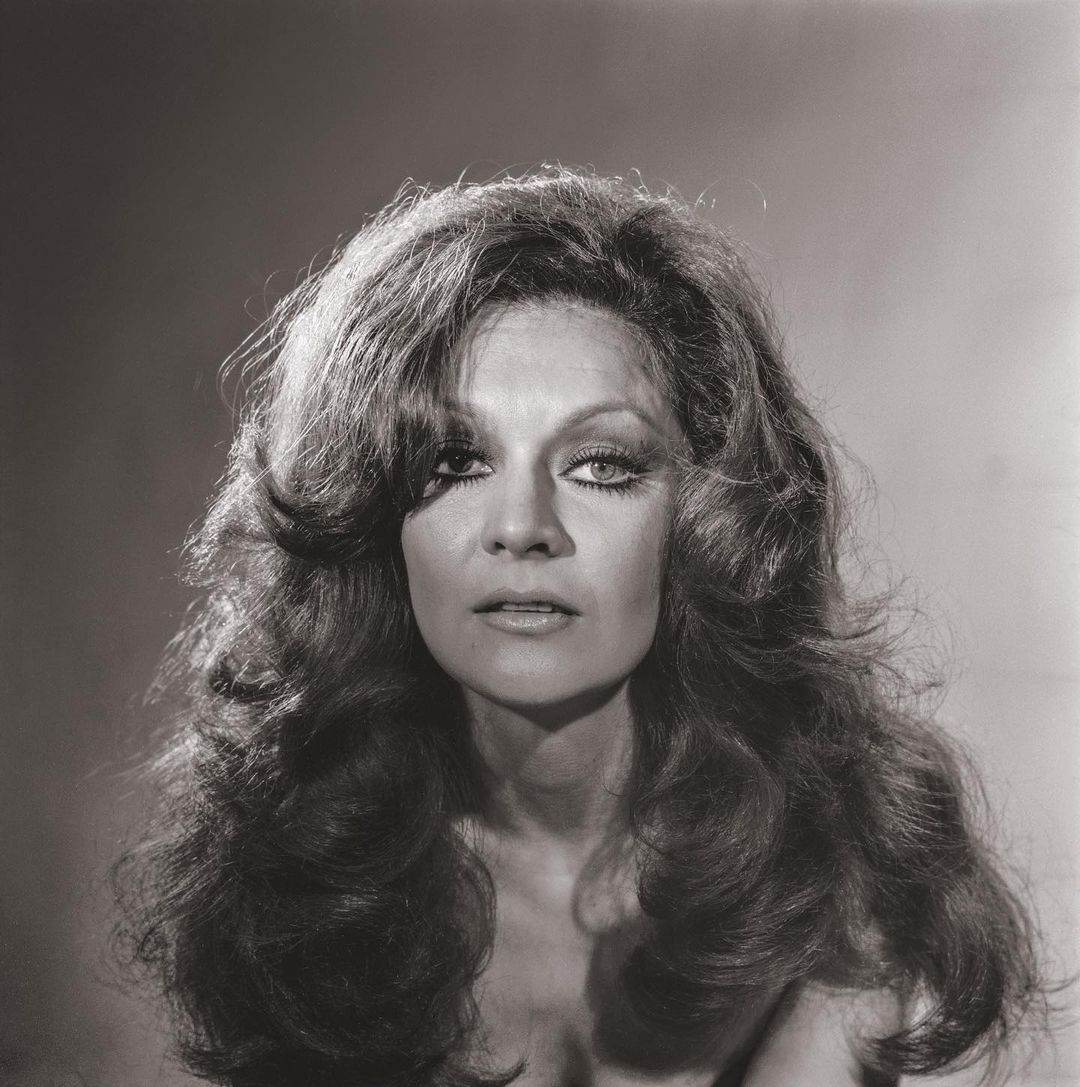
- Born: Ethel Inés Rojo Castro; December 23, 1937; Santiago del Estero
- Died: June 24, 2012 (aged 74); Buenos Aires, Argentina
- Burial place: Cementerio de la Chacarita
- Occupation(s): Actress, vedette and theater director
- Spouse: Gerardo González
- Relatives: Gogó Rojo

Ethel Rojo (née Ethel Inés Rojo Castro; December 23, 1937 in Santiago del Estero – June 24, 2012 in Buenos Aires) was an Argentine actress, vedette, dancer and theater director. She was the sister of Gogó Rojo.

== Filmography ==
- 1955: Pobre pero honrado
- 1956: El satélite chiflado
- 1957: Amor se dice cantando
- 1961: Tres de la Cruz Roja
- 1962: Esa pícara pelirroja
- 1964: Minnesota Clay
- 1964: Stop at Tenerife
- 1965: Fuerte perdido
- 1974: Hay que romper la rutina
- 1975: Maridos en vacaciones
- 1976: La noche del hurto
- 1977: La obertura
- 1980: Sujeto volador no identificado
- 1980: La noche viene movida
- 1980: Frutilla
- 1985: Mingo y Aníbal contra los fantasmas
- 2008: Luisa

== Television ==
She was the TV entertainer in Gánele al Dos (1988).
