= Diosa Canales =

Venezuelan singer, actress, and model

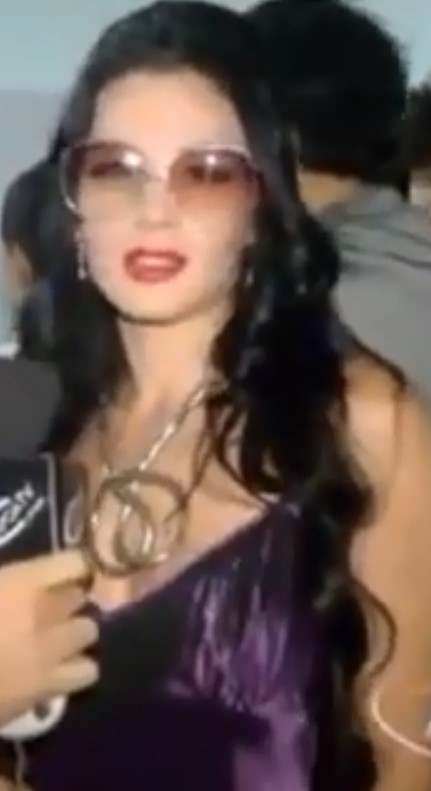
- Diosa Canales (Maracaibo)

Background information
- Born: Dioshaily Rosfer Canales Gil; 11 January 1987 (age 39); El Tigre, Venezuela
- Origin: Venezuela
- Genres: Merengue, Reggaeton
- Occupations: vedette and actor singer, model
- Years active: 2006–present
- Labels: Independent
- Website: www.canalesdiosa.com

Dioshaily Rosfer Canales Gil (born 11 January 1987), better known as Diosa Canales, is a Venezuelan singer, actress, and model.

== Career ==
Diosa Canales is set to release her first album, La Bomba Sexy de Venezuela, described as a fusion of merengue and reggaeton.

Diosa is known for making promises of getting naked if her country's national football team wins a football tournament, just like Larissa Riquelme does; the two have gotten naked in public several times already. Also, like Riquelme, she became an internet phenomenon: first, when she got naked in front of her twitcam and was watched by more than 30,000 people in less than 12 minutes and became a trending topic until she got censored by Twitter, and later when she appeared dressed in short clothes with the colors of her national football team. She has worked also as a calendar model.

== Personal life ==
In March 2015 Canales was rushed to hospital following a fall from a pole while practising a pole dancing routine; landing on her chest she burst her breast implant. She made a full recovery.

In May 2016 she and her husband Jose Roberto Rojas Romero (32) were arrested for allegedly beating up her mother-in-law.
