= Vedette (cabaret) =

Main female artists in cabaret and related stagecraft

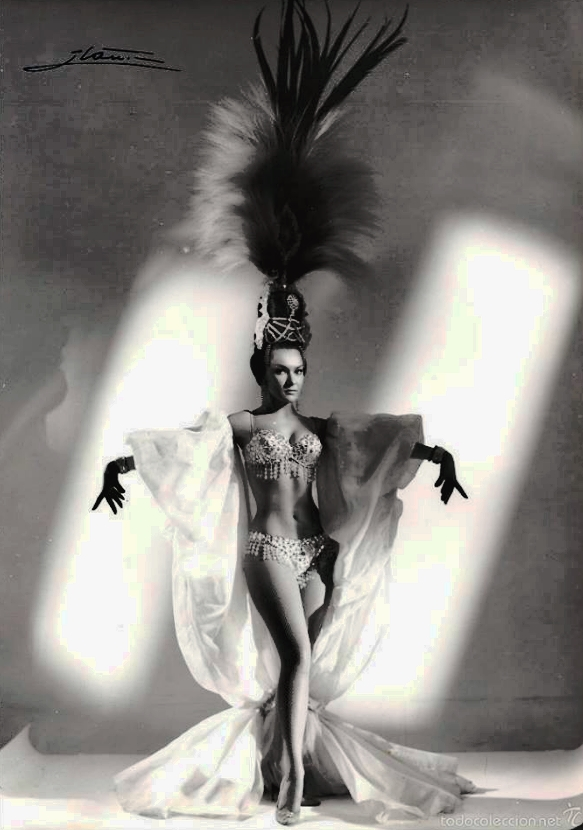
The Argentine vedette Ethel Rojo in a revista porteña (Buenos Aires revue), c. 1950s–1960s.

A vedette is the main female artist of a show derived from cabaret and its subcategories of revue, vaudeville, music hall or burlesque. The purpose of the vedette is to entertain and captivate the public. Vedettes are expected to sing, dance and act on stage. Particularly accomplished artistes are considered super vedettes or first vedettes. Vedettes often wear flashy and revealing costumes and may appear alongside groups of dancers, magicians, comedians, jugglers, or even performing animals. Vedettes specializing in burlesque generally do striptease and may also perform nude on stage.

In the 20th century, vedette shows were successful in the cabarets, theaters and nightclubs of countries such as Spain, France, Argentina and Mexico. Paris and Las Vegas were considered the main cradle of the vedettes.

== Etymology ==
Vedette is a French word that designates the star of a show, at the top of the billing. The meaning of the term has changed over the years. From the early twentieth century, it began to be used for the main female artists in cabaret shows such as burlesque, vaudeville, music hall or revue. The height of fame and popularity of these performers coincided with the periods of sexual liberation in the 20th century – the 1920s, 1940s and 1970s.

The popularity of vedettes in France began to increase at the beginning of the 20th century. Thereafter they achieved greater popularity in Latin countries. At different times they became an exotic feature of the nightlife of Spain, Argentina and Mexico. The term vedette is little used in English-speaking countries. In the United States there are popular cabaret and burlesque shows in Las Vegas, where the term used for the performers is showgirl. Venues such as Le Lido, the Moulin Rouge, and the Crazy Horse in France, the Teatro Maipo and the Teatro El Nacional in Argentina, and the Teatro de la Ciudad "Esperanza Iris" in Mexico are or were famous for their vedette shows.

== Europe ==
=== France ===
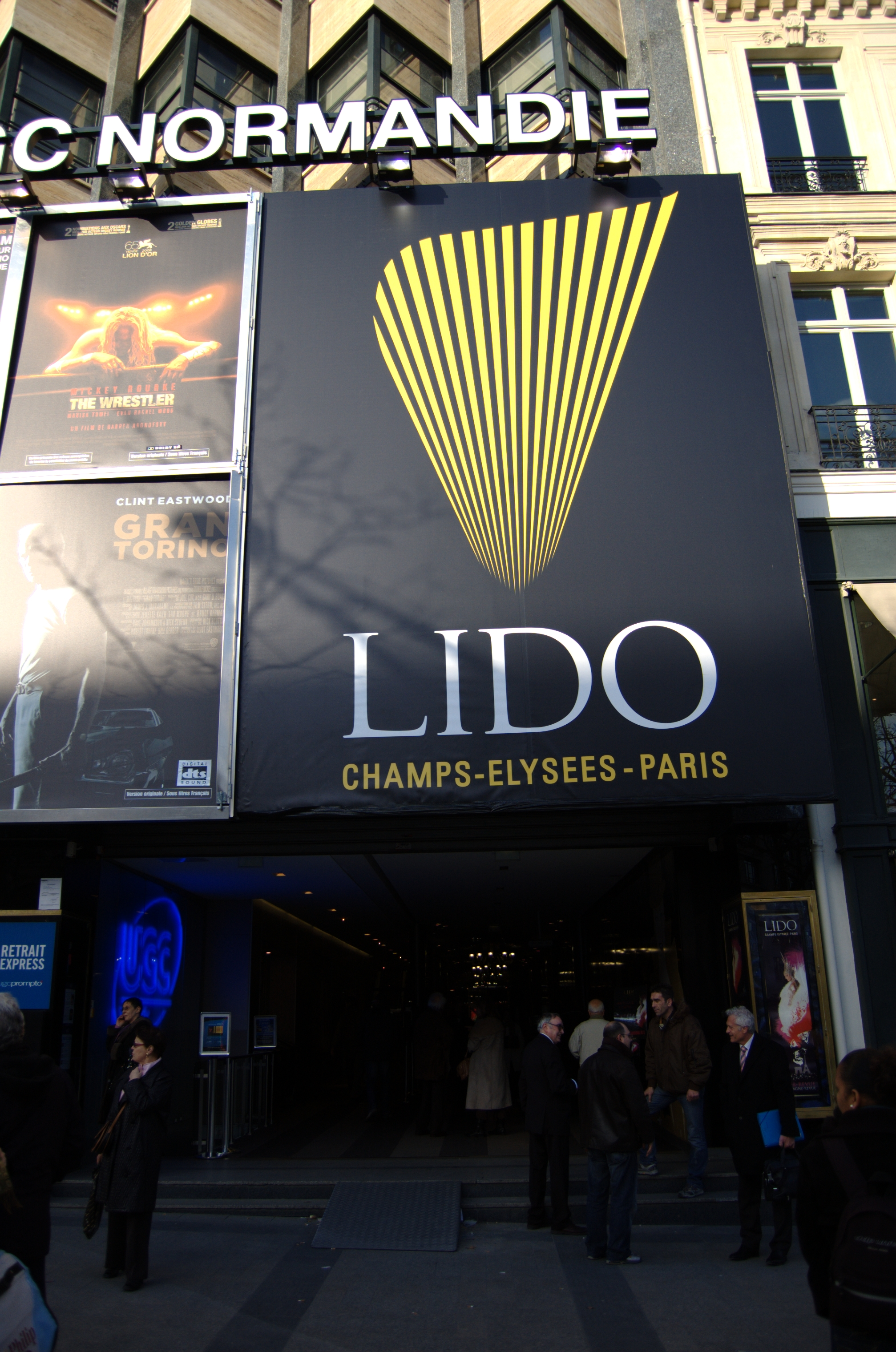
Le Lido of Paris

France is considered the cradle of vedettes worldwide. Its capital, Paris, has been home to some of the most famous cabarets in the world. Among these are the Moulin Rouge and the Folies Bergère, pioneers of night shows in which the vedettes appeared on the scene half naked and doing Tableau vivant. Other famous venues are the Le Lido and Bataclan, also famous for their vaudeville and revues. In more recent times, the Crazy Horse also became a notable cabaret.

Famous French vedettes included the "Three Graces" of the Belle Époque: Émilienne d'Alençon, Liane de Pougy, and La Bella Otero. The famous Mistinguett became one of the most popular French artists of her time while Madame Rasimi is remembered as the founder of the Bataclan. Another outstanding figure was Gina Palerme.

At the beginning of the 20th century, the novelist Colette also performed in revue. Another prominent figure of that time was the world-famous Dutch spy Mata Hari. The legendary Cléo de Mérode of the Folies Bergère was another of the great stars.

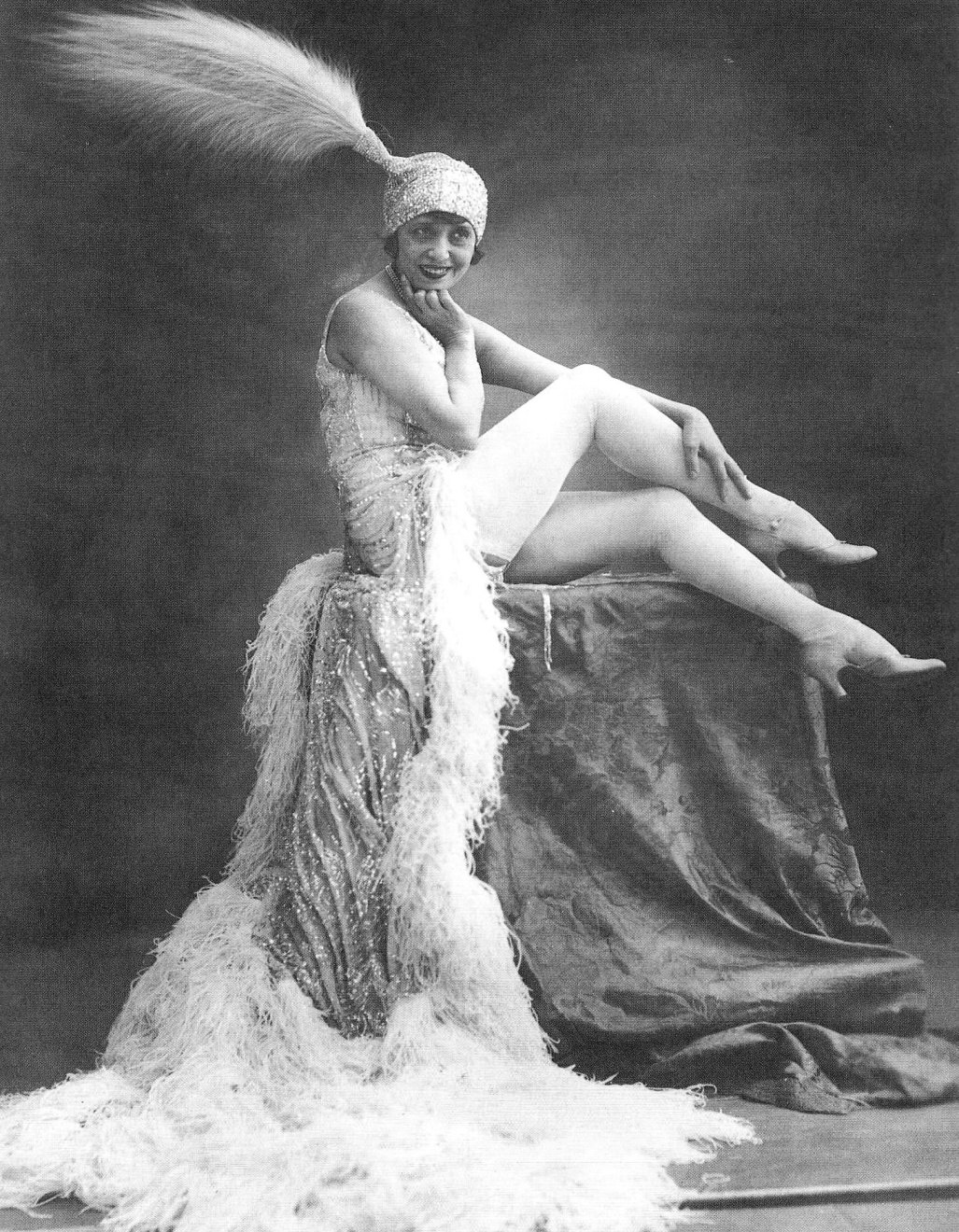
Mistinguett at the Moulin Rouge

Joséphine Baker, of American origin, is remembered as one of the most important vedettes. Her "Revue Nègre", which included a jazz orchestra, caused a sensation. Her exotic dance form, her uninhibited sexuality and her minimal dress (which included a skirt made of bananas) were more attractive to Europeans than to Americans. She became the star of Parisian nights and even opened her own club, Chez Josephine.

Another important figure was Coccinelle, considered the first transgender vedette in history. The actress and singer Liliane Montevecchi stood out as vedette in the Folies Bergère in the 1970s, and eventually conquered Broadway. Another figure of the time was the Italian Xenia Monty.

In recent times the vedette shows have emphasized figures like Arielle Dombasle (known as the vedette-like Dolorès Sugar Rose) and Marlène Mourreau.

=== Spain ===
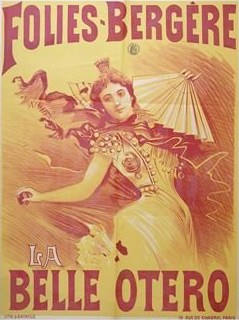
La Bella Otero in an 1894 Folies Bergère poster

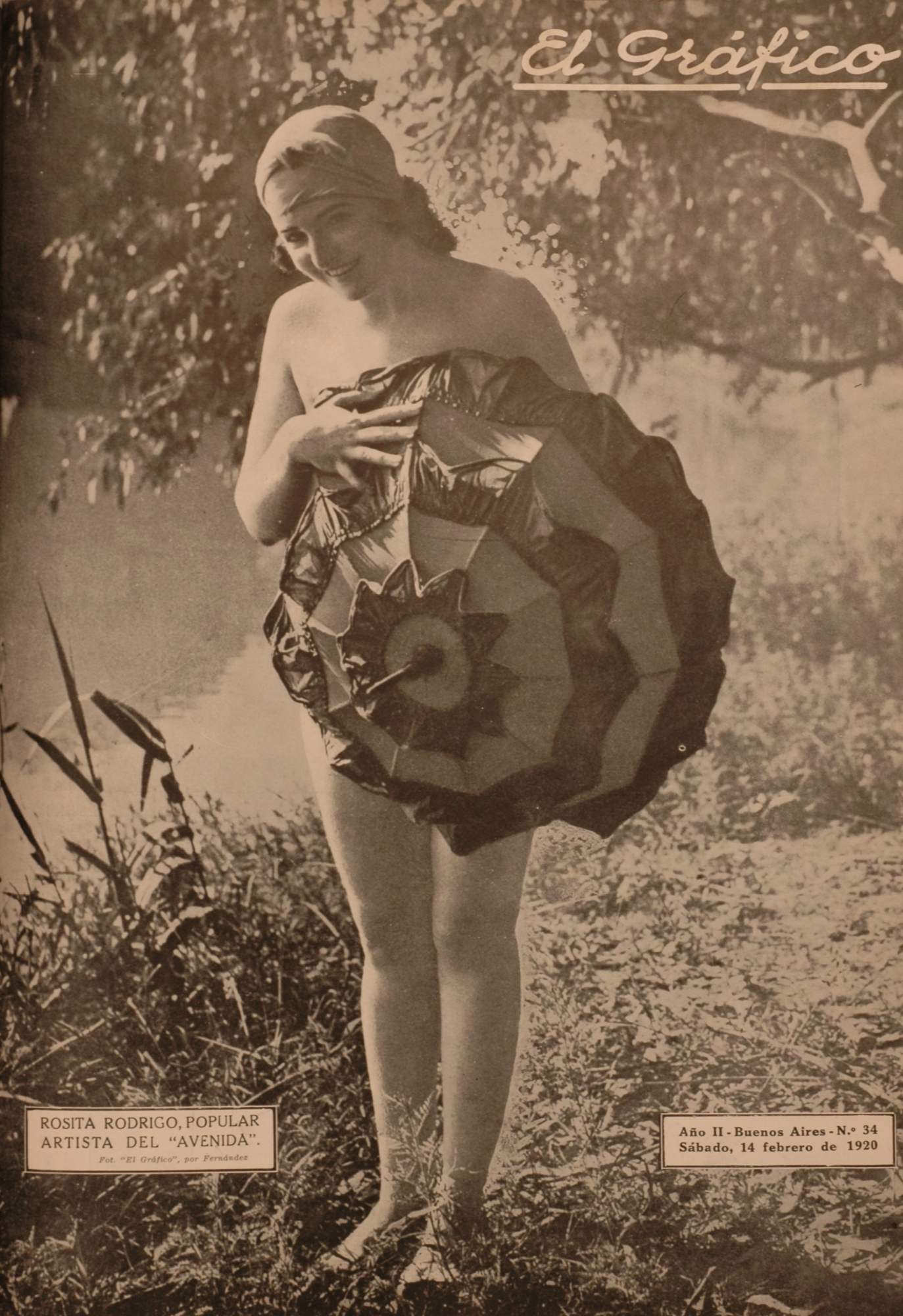
Rosita Rodrigo (El Gráfico, 1920)

One of the first vedettes that stood out in Spain are La Bella Otero, a celebrated courtesan who settled in France, one of the most outstanding personages of the Belle Époque in the artistic circles and the gallant life of Paris; Luisa Esteso, famous comedian actress; Encarnación Fernández, who had most of her career in Argentina; Celia Gámez (of Argentine origin), one of the most popular stars of Spain in the first half of the twentieth century, and who owes much of the splendor of the Revues; Paquita Garzón; Rosario Guerrero (called "The Beautiful Guerrero"); Rosita Rodrigo; Tina de Jarque, Rosario Soler "La Patita", Paquita Escribano, Carmen Tórtola Valencia, specialist in oriental dances and pioneer of women's liberation, and the sisters Laura and Victoria Pinillos.

The 1940s highlighted figures such as Trini Alonso, María Antinea (also famous in Argentina and Mexico); Maruja Boldoba, Florinda Chico, Gema del Rio, the popular Manolita Chen and her company; Teresita Silva; Maruja Tomás and Helga Liné.

The 1950s highlighted stars like Mary Begoña, one of the comedic actresses par excellence of the Spanish scene; Licia Calderón, Queta Claver (that became one of the major vedettes of Spain); Raquel Daina; Marujita Díaz, considered as the "Queen of the Copla" and "Queen of the Spanish Music Revue" and Carmen de Lirio, famous during the Franco dictatorship.

In the sixties, famous figures such as Mary Santpere, called "La Reina del Paralelo" (The Queen of the Parallel) reached the fame of Barcelona's homonymous street, where the greatest number of theaters were concentrated in the 20th century; Rosita Amores became a popular entertainer in the Valencian Community in the mid-60s, avoiding censorship during the Franco regime; Marisol Ayuso; Ingrid Garbo, of German origin; Vicky Lagos; Vicky Lusson; Katia Loritz; Esperanza Roy, and Lina Morgan, known for comic strips. Sara Montiel is a notable vedette from this decade who also had a notable film career.

In the 1970s María José Cantudo starred in the first full-length female nude (seen through a mirror) of Spanish cinema; Eva León Conde and Barbara Rey were also popular vedettes of the period.

From the 1980s and 1990s stand out figures such as Lita Claver "La Maña"; Norma Duval, one of the last stars of the traditional magazine, a type of spectacle that during those years was in decline and that was maintained mainly thanks to the tourists who visited Paris; Tania Doris, another one of the last representatives of the sort in Spain; Paloma Hurtado, María José Nieto "Maripepa", Rosa Valenty, Africa Pratt and the French Marlène Mourreau.

In the last years they have emphasized figures like La Terremoto de Alcorcón and the transsexual actresses ´Bibiana Fernandez, La Veneno, Paca la Piraña and La Prohibida.

== The Americas ==
=== Argentina ===
The local revue or revista porteña was popularized in Buenos Aires from the 1920s, mainly in the Teatro Maipo. Tita Merello became one of the most famous vedettes of the time.

In the 1950s vedettes of Cuban origin appeared, like Blanquita Amaro Amelia Vargas and Rosita Fornés. They had all the glitz, grace and glamor that characterized the era, and shared the stage with local stars like Nélida Roca.

In the 1960s figures appeared like Zulma Faiad, Nélida Lobato, Susana Brunetti, Norma Pons, Egle Martín and the Puerto Rican Iris Chacón, called the "Vedette of America".

The 1970s and 1980s gave way to other stars like Graciela Alfano and the sisters Ethel and Gogó Rojo. Others who arose at that time and remained in force in the following years were Susana Giménez Moria Casán and Bettina Vardé. and the man-vedette Jorge Perez Evelyn.

In the 1990s, new vedettes appeared, some of whose fame would spread to the next decade, such as Cris Miró, María Fernanda Callejón, the Puerto Rican Lourdes Chacón and Monica Ayos.

In the first years of the 21st century there has been a return of the revues in the Avenida Corrientes with figures like Florencia de la V, María Eugenia Ritó, Adabel Guerrero, and Valeria Archimó.

=== Mexico ===
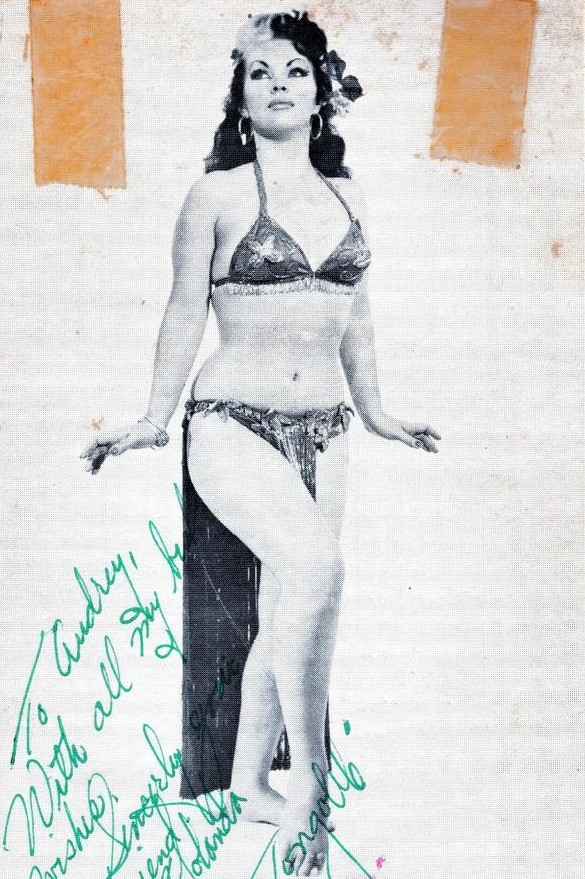
Yolanda Montes

The image of the vedette in Mexico arose from the beginning of the 20th century with the so-called "Carpas" and the Revues. Some venues such as Teatro Principal, the Teatro Colón and the Teatro Arbeu were considered cathedrals of the revues and burlesque in Mexico City. There arose figures like Lupe Vélez, who, before being consecrated as a star in Hollywood, was considered one of the queens of the frivolous theater. The main figure of the time was Maria Conesa "The White Kitten", who also had a very long career spanning theater, film and television. Other outstanding figures then were Esperanza Iris, Celia Montalván, Lupe Rivas Cacho, Amparo Arozamena, Prudencia Grifell, Celia Padilla, Delia Magaña, Lupe Inclán, Aurora Walker, Amelia Wilhelmy and Mimí Derba, among others. Conesa, Montalván and Rivas Cacho, were even immortalized in a famous foxtrot called Mi querido capitán (My dear captain).

In the 1950s saw a resurgence of nightlife in Mexico City. Venues like the Tivoli, the Waikikí, the Margo (after the Teatro Blanquita), the Follies Bergere and the Teatro Lírico, among others, became the main forums for the blossoming of the vedettes. Special mention should be made of the Exoticas, a group of vedettes that caused fury in Mexico's nightlife in the late 1940s and early 1950s. These "Exoticas" were characterized by using extravagant names, and their shows included African, Tahitian or Oriental dances. The most famous of the "Exoticas" was Yolanda Montes "Tongolele", one of the most important dancers of Latin America, in force for more than sixty years. Together with Tongolele, the most famous were Su Muy Key The Chinese Doll, and Kalantan. Other famous "Exóticas" were Trudi Bora, Turanda, Joyce Cameron, Tanabonga, Tundra, Gemma, Eda Lorna, Kurumba, Bongala, Tula Montenegro, Brenda Conde, Josefina del Mar and Naná. Parallel to the success of the Exoticas, appeared in Mexico the famous "Rumberas", dancers of Afro-American rhythms. The Rumberas created their own cinematographic genre: The Rumberas film In the called Golden Age of Mexican cinema. The Rumberas films reflected the life of the women in the night centers and cabarets. The main exponents of the genre were the Cubans María Antonieta Pons, Amalia Aguilar, Ninón Sevilla and Rosa Carmina as well as Meche Barba. These women were complete vedettes who never needed to explicitly teach their bodies, captivating audiences only with their dances and other stage talents. The Rumberas also performed shows and live performances in important venues. With the decline of the Rumberas film in the mid-fifties, some rumberas broadened their horizons and ventured into vedette shows. Particularly remembered are the live shows of Amalia Aguilar and Rosa Carmina, who filled stadiums in countries in Central and South America. The Cuban Rosita Fornés deserves special mention. She reached the final consecration in Mexico before conquering the rest of the continent.

In the 1960s the splendor of the vedettes in Mexico lost force. Even so, worthy of mention are the shows offered in venues such as the Blanquita Theater or "El Patio" by the stars such as Sonia Furió, Ana Luisa Peluffo and Ana Bertha Lepe. In the midst of the fury of the Rock and Roll era, were famous figures like Malú Reyes and Emily Cranz. Actresses such as Jacqueline Voltaire and Irán Eory also performed shows as vedettes.

The 1970s and 1980s are considered the golden era of the vedettes in Mexico, thanks to a massive revival of nightlife in the country's capital. Mexico City was flooded with nightclubs, cabarets of all levels and burlesque theaters where the vedettes began to bloom. Among the most important nightclubs that illuminated the capital of the country are the Terazza Casino, the Capri (from the Hotel Regis), the Imperial, the Minuet, the Rio Rosa, La Fuente, El Conjunto Marrakech, La Copa de Champagne, El Cordiale, El Rondinella, El Clóset, El Quid, El 77, the Impala Bar and the Belvedere of the Hilton Continental Hotel. Some cabarets such as La Burbuja, Montparnasse, Las Fabulosas, El Can-Can, Los Globos, King Kong and Savoy also reached a great boom, while theaters like El Iris, El Blanquita and the Teatro Fru Fru presented burlesque shows, where the shows were more audacious and explicit. In addition, thanks to television, movies and magazines, the vedettes in Mexico reached their highest point of popularity. Many of them also ventured into the cinema, within the so-called Mexican sex comedy. On the other hand, the popular television program Variedades de medianoche (Varieties of the Midnight) contributed to the boom of these women and launched to the fame to dozens of them.

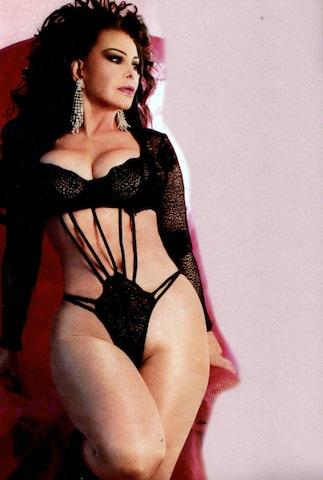
Rossy Mendoza

Among the legendary vedettes that illuminated the nightlife of Mexico City are Olga Breeskin also known as "Super Olga" who achieved great fame for her spectacular performances where she danced surrounded by dancers and exotic animals while playing the violin; Angélica Chaín, who achieved fame first in magazines, then start a career as a vedette and finally consecrate herself in the cinema; Amira Cruzat, famous for her show known as The Dressing Room of Amira Cruzat; Lila Deneken "The Number One", important singer and the first Latin American star to present a show at the Monte-Carlo Sporting Club; the Argentine Zulma Faiad who settled in Mexico much of the decade of the 1970s and reached a great fame in cinema and night centers; Gloriella, popular star of the burlesque and numerous movies; Princesa Lea, very popular for presenting a show in which she bathed in a glass of champagne; Lyn May, of Chinese ancestry, pioneer of the nudes and one of the principal stars of the burlesque; Rossy Mendoza, known popularly as "The Body" or "The Shorter Waist", thanks to her impressive anatomy; Sasha Montenegro, who on par of her film career performed live shows that attracted the public because of her popularity; The Brazilian Gina Montes, famous by her appearance in a popular TV Show; Grace Renat, The Goddess of the Night, Irma Serrano, who scandalized at the time with her controversial theatrical spectacles in the enclosure of her property, the Theater Fru-Frú; Wanda Seux, called "The Golden Bomb" and considered the "Barbie" of the vedettes for her thin figure and blonde hair; Thelma Tixou "The Girl of the Golden Body", native of Argentina, famous for her stature and imposing physique, and star for several years of the famous cabaret El Capri, Isela Vega, popular Mexican film actress, who scandalized audiences with her provocative shows in the stage, and Princesa Yamal, famous by her Arabian exotic dances.

Other outstanding figures were Brigitte Aubé, Cleopatra, Alejandra del Moral, Mora Escudero, Gioconda, Ivonne Govea, Iris Cristal, Yolanda Liévana, Norma Lee, Mara Marú, Miss Melina Mey, Gina Morett, the transgender Jessica Muriel, Valeria Pani, Noelia Noel, Gabriela Ríos, Olga Ríos, Lina Santos, Merle Uribe and Judith Velasco Herrera, among many others.

In the year 2016, the filmmaker María José Cuevas made the documentary Beauties of the Night, which portrays the life of five of these great vedettes.

One of the last great vedettes in Mexico was Francis García, a transvestite artist who was the main star of the Teatro Blanquita for more than a decade. In recent years, large night centers have virtually disappeared from Mexico. Some actresses and singers perform shows of vedettes in other venues, such as the Palenques. Among them are figures such as Costa Rican Maribel Guardia, Mexicans Lorena Herrera, Mariana Seoane, the transgender Alejandra Bogue and Ninel Conde and the Cubans Niurka Marcos and Lis Vega.

=== United States ===
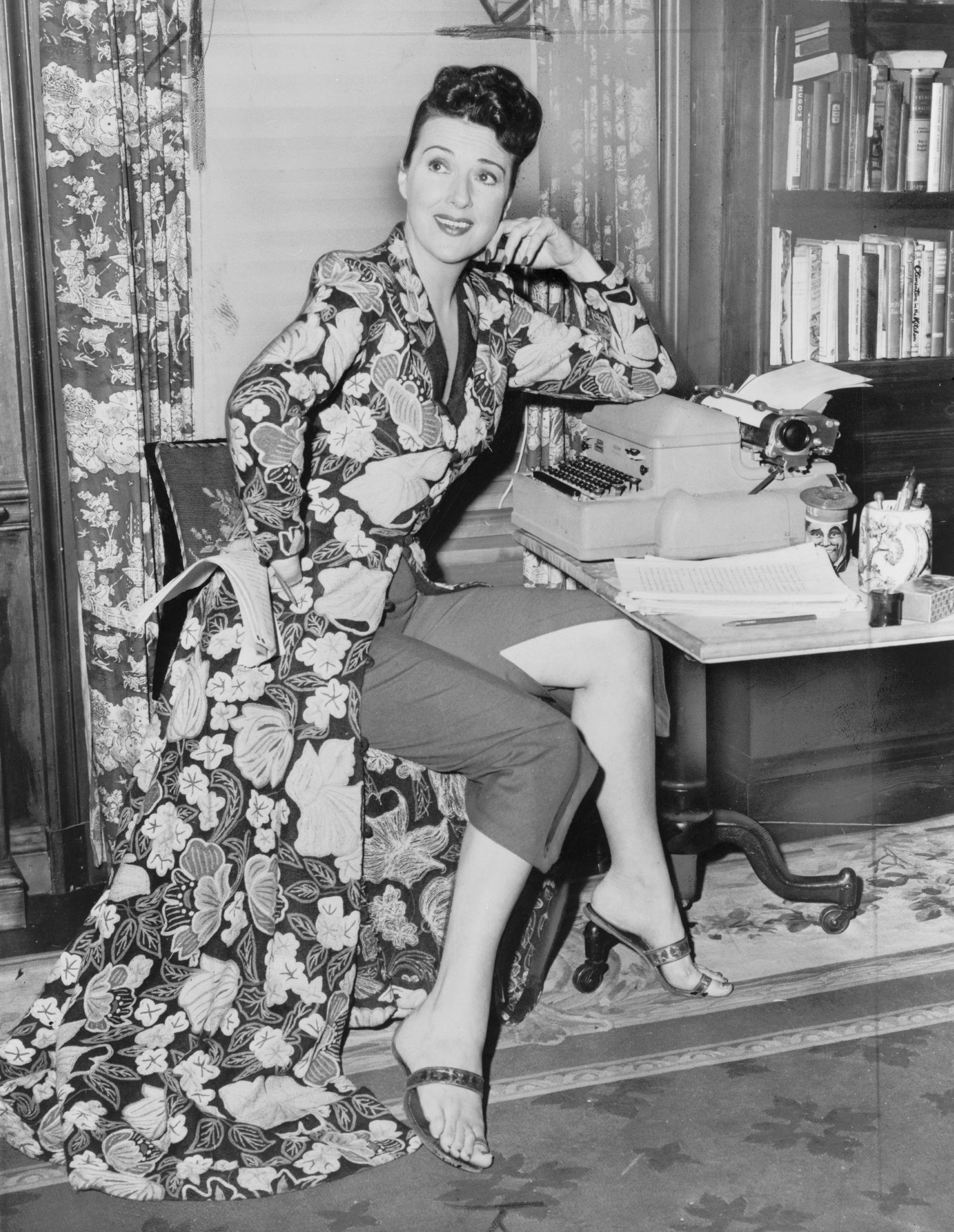
Gypsy Rose Lee

The term "vedette" is not commonly used in the United States or other Anglo-Saxon countries, where they are called "showgirls" instead. Las Vegas is considered, after Paris, as the main venue for revue shows and musicals worldwide.

Briton Lydia Thompson became a leading dancer and actress in burlesques on the London stage. She introduced Victorian burlesque to America with her troupe the "British Blondes", in 1868, to great acclaim and notoriety.

Of the most famous American vedettes, stand out May Yohé, one of the most valued figures of the vaudeville at the beginning of the century; The aforementioned Josephine Baker, who ended up consecrating herself in France, where she was more popular than in her own country; Fanny Brice, star of the famous Ziegfeld Follies, queen of the theater, revues and later also star of cinema and the radio; Sally Rand, actress and dancer, specializing in fan dancing, which she popularized at the Paramount Club, and who because of the postures considered indecent she adopted with the dance was sometimes arrested. Also conceived the famous dance of the bubble; Zorita, famous for her shows where she played double roles and for her dances where she used boas and other exotic animals; Evelyn West, also known as "The Hubba Hubba Girl", a burlesque legend of the forties, fifties and sixties; Ann Corio, who also works in several Hollywood films; Mae West, who achieved tremendous fame, first in theater and then in Hollywood, where she scandalized censorship for her provocative behavior and spicy phrases. In the 1950s and 1960s, she achieved fame in her shows, which included groups of dancers and bodybuilders; Gypsy Rose Lee, immortalized in the famous autobiographical musical Gypsy. Her innovations consisted of a casual style, against the spasmodic movements of other strippers (she emphasized the joke during the striptease) and brought a keen sense of humor to her performances. She was one of the main stars of the Minsky's Burlesque, with whom she worked four years. While working with the Minsky brothers she was arrested several times. Another important figure of this time was Novita "The Pixie of Burlesque", one of the founders of the Exotic Dancers League (EDL). In the 1940s and 1950s, the exotic dancer Lottie 'The Body' Graves also shone in the burlesque. She was known as "The Black Gypsy Rose Lee". In the 1950s and 1960s Jennie Lee was considered one of the queens of burlesque.

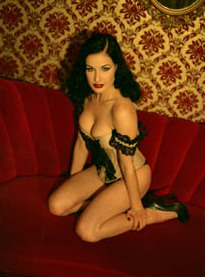
Dita Von Teese

In the 1960s and 1970s some burlesque figures peaked in the United States, particularly at the shows offered in Las Vegas. These included Tempest Storm, Lili St. Cyr, Blaze Starr, Kitten Natividad, Tura Satana, Bambi Jones Princess Cheyenne, and Satan's Angel.

The most important figure in recent years has been Liza Minnelli.

Today, among the most famous vedettes in the United States are Dita Von Teese, who was the star of Crazy Horse, Julie Atlas Muz, Michelle L'amour, Amanda Lepore, Catherine D'lish, Miss Dirty Martini, the British Immodesty Blaize, Angie Pontani, Jo Weldon and the Singaporean Sukki Singapora, the first international burlesque artist in Singapore. Singapora became the first burlesque artist in the world to be invited to tea at Buckingham Palace as a recognition of her contribution to the arts as an Asian model.

=== Other ===
Other prominent vedettes who have appeared in the world are the Puerto Rican Iris Chacón, the Brazilian Luz del Fuego, the Venezuelans Haydée Balza and Diosa Canales, the Cubans Chelo Alonso and Rita Montaner, and the Peruvian Amparo Brambilla.

== In popular culture ==
=== Film ===
- Lola-Lola in the film The Blue Angel (1930)
- Gypsy Rose Lee in the film Gypsy (1962)
- Sally Bowles in several works, notably the musical Cabaret (1966)
- Miss Piggy in The Muppet Show (1976)
- Miss Kitty Mouse in the film The Great Mouse Detective (1986)
- Jessica Rabbit in the film Who Framed Roger Rabbit (1988)
- Satine in the film Moulin Rouge! (2001)
- Roxie Hart in the film Chicago (2002)

== See also ==
- Geisha
- Nightclub act
