= USS Howarda =

Patrol vessel of the United States Navy

History

United States
- Name: USS Howarda
- Namesake: Previous name retained
- Builder: Essington Company, Pennsylvania
- Completed: 1913
- Acquired: 11 June 1917
- Commissioned: 19 June 1917
- Stricken: 31 March 1919
- Fate: Transferred to United States Coast Guard 3 May 1919 or 1 July 1919
- Notes: Operated as private yacht Howarda 1913–1917; Served in U.S. Coast Guard as USCGC Vidette 1919–1922

General characteristics
- Type: Patrol vessel
- Displacement: 38 tons
- Length: 75 ft (23 m)
- Beam: 16 ft (4.9 m)
- Draft: 3 ft 4 in (1.02 m)
- Propulsion: Gasoline engine
- Speed: 9 knots
- Armament: 1 × 3-pounder gun

USS Howarda (SP-144) was an armed yacht that served in the United States Navy as a patrol vessel from 1917 to 1919.

Howarda was built as a wooden-hulled civilian yacht in 1913 by the Essington Company in Essington, Pennsylvania. The U.S. Navy acquired Howarda from her owner, H. S. Kerner of Boca Grande, Florida, on 11 June 1917 for use as a patrol boat during World War I. She was commissioned on 19 June 1917 as USS Howarda (SP-144).

Assigned to the 7th Naval District, Howarda was based at Egmont Key, Florida, and patrolled waters in the Gulf of Mexico and Tampa Bay, serving as guard boat and section patrol craft.

Howarda was stricken from the Navy Directory and offered for sale on 31 March 1919, but later was withdrawn from sale. Instead, she was transferred to the United States Department of the Treasury for use by the United States Coast Guard on 3 May 1919 or 1 July 1919. She served in the Coast Guard from 1919 to 1922 as cutter USCGC Vidette.
