= Bambi Jones =

American Burlesque dancer and author (1931–2022)

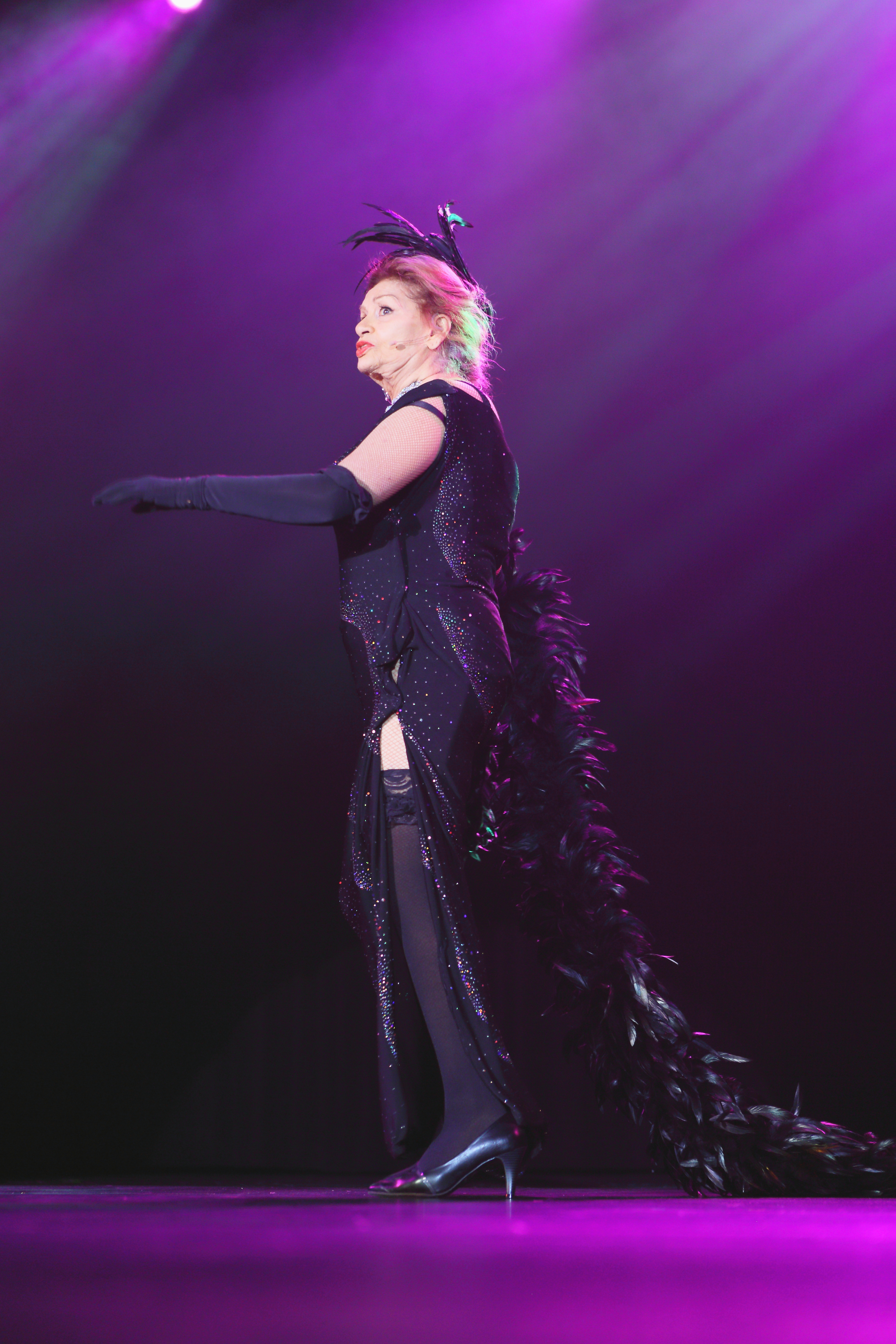
- Jones onstage at the 2012; Burlesque Hall of Fame
- Born: May 1, 1931; Holyoke, Massachusetts, U.S.
- Died: November 12, 2022 (aged 91)
- Other name: Doris Kotzan
- Occupations: Dancer, author

Bambi Jones (May 1, 1931 – November 12, 2022), also known as Doris Kotzan, was an American Burlesque dancer, Vedette and author of the book My Journey Burlesque The Way It Was. She appeared in the documentary Exotic World & The Burlesque Revival.

== Life and career ==
Bambi Jones was born in Holyoke, Massachusetts on May 1, 1931. She admired the movie stars of the 1940s. At age 17, she moved to the bright lights to pursue her career in show biz. Jones worked in a hotel bar and would always dance to the jukebox there. A photographer from McVann's night club saw talent in Jones and invited her to dance for their club. She loved to dance so she took the job. Jones would later be scouted by an ex-Rockette and appear on burlesque stages throughout South America, Mexico, Canada, and the United States as "Bambi Jones".

The Burlesque Hall of Fame named her the 2021 winner of the Living Legend Award. She died on November 12, 2022, at the age of 91.
