= Norma Pons =

Argentine actress and vedette

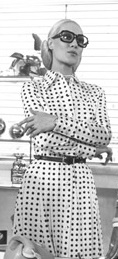
- Pons in 1976
- Born: Norma Delia Orizi; 18 August 1942; Rosario, Santa Fe, Argentina
- Died: 29 April 2014 (aged 71); Buenos Aires, Argentina
- Occupations: Actress, vedette/showgirl

Norma Delia Orizi (18 August 1942 – 29 April 2014) known by her stage name Norma Pons, was an Argentine actress and vedette.
