= Cry Chicago =

1969 film

- Directed by: Javier Setó
- Written by: Javier Setó; Luigi Mondello
- Starring: Jeffrey Hunter, Guglielmo Spoletini, Gogó Rojo, Eduardo Fajardo, Víctor Israel
- Cinematography: Emilio Foriscot
- Edited by: Antonio Gimeno
- Music by: Gian Franco Reverberi
- Release date: 22 September 1969
- Running time: 105 minutes
- Countries: Spain; Italy
- Languages: Spanish; Italian
- Budget: 8 169 771 ESP

Cry Chicago (originally ¡Viva América! and also released as The Mafia Mob, Italian: La vera storia di Frank Mannata) is a 1969 Spanish-Italian crime film directed by the Catalan film director Javier Setó (in the credit Saviero Seto), starring Jeffrey Hunter in his final film appearance, Guglielmo Spoletini, Eduardo Fajardo, Víctor Israel, Pier Angeli, Margaret Lee and Gogó Rojo.

== Plot ==
After the Great Depression Francesco Mannata started out to America from Sicily to his brother Salvatore in Chicago. Francesco takes the name Frank Mannata and with Salvatore and their sister, Rosella organized a mafia empire. The mafia war breaks out between the Sicilian Mannatas and the Italo-Irish O'Connor-Messina gangs. Many people die in the conflicts (including Salvatore and Rose); finally, Frank Mannata is killed by the minor gangster Dr. MacDonald.

== Cast ==
- Jeffrey Hunter: Frank (Francesco) Mannata
- Guglielmo Spoletini: Salvatore Mannata, Frank's brother
- Margaret Lee: Lucy Barrett, Frank's wife
- Gogó Rojo: Rosella (Rose) Mannata, Frank's sister
- Pier Angeli: Bambi (as Anna Maria Pierangeli), Salvatore's lover
- Eduardo Fajardo: Dick O'Connor, Irish gangster boos
- Víctor Israel: Dr. MacDonald, doctor, consultant and gangster
- Beni Deus: Timothy, Rosella's Greek husband
- Paloma Cela
- Luis Induni: Buchanan, police chief of Chicago
- Sun De Sanders: Patricia
- Barta Barri: Matón, O'Connor's henchman
- Antonio Pica: Federel agent Ethen Lason
- Ricardo Palacios: Charlie Romero, bar owner
- Lola Villar: prostituta
- Mike Brendel
- Miguel del Castillo: O'Brian, gangster and O'Connor's mate
- Juan Olaguivel: O'Brian's bodyguard and driver
- Fernando Bilbao
- Kathy Lagarde
- Yamil Omar: Turkish immigrant
- Antonia Mas: Mammy, proprietress of bordello
- Rafael Vaquero
- Adolfo Thous
- Manuel Bermúdez Boliche
- José Solís
- Armando Calvo: Senator Charles Temple

== Production ==
Setó's movie partly is the epigon of crime film They Paid with Bullets: Chicago 1929 (1969) of Julio Diamante.

While in Spain in November 1968 to film Cry Chicago, Jeffrey Hunter was injured in an on-set explosion when a car window near him, which had been rigged to explode outward, accidentally exploded inward. Hunter sustained a serious concussion. According to Hunter's wife Emily, he "...went into shock" on the plane ride back to the United States after filming. After landing, Hunter was taken to Good Samaritan Hospital in Los Angeles but doctors could not find any serious injuries. On May 26, 1969, Hunter suffered an intracranial hemorrhage in Van Nuys, California. He fell and struck his head on a banister, fracturing his skull. He was found unconscious and taken to Valley Presbyterian Hospital where he underwent brain surgery to repair his injuries. He died the following morning at the age of 42. This was Hunter's final completed film role.
