= Victoria Pinillos =

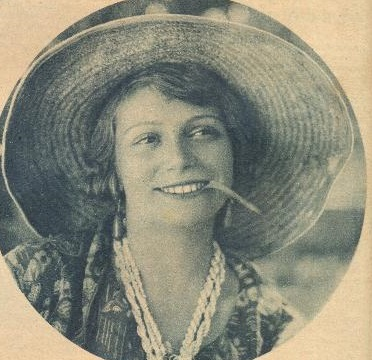
Victoria Pinillos in 1927

Victoria Pinillos was a Spanish actress, dancer and vedette known in Argentina with her sister Laura.

In 1928 it was released Vértigo, a musical theatre by Ivo Pelay, Luis César Amadori and Humberto Cairo, alongside the first Spanish actors and actress Manolo Rico, Samuel Giménez and Enriqueta Mesa, and vedettes Perlita Grecco, Victoria Cuenca and Ángela Cuenca. One year later it was released Lulú, a French musical comedy by Serge Veber, Georges van Parys and Philippe Parès with Gran Compañía de Comedias Musicales y Piezas de Gran Espectáculo alongside Laura Pinillos, Vicente Climent, Pedro Quartucci, Amanda Las Heras, Ida Delmas, and Felisa Bonorino, between others.

Laura debuted since an early age and they were partners, known as Hermanas Pinilla, but Victoria retired early, so Laura left the variety genre and she worked in magazines. More than fifteen years later she worked as a comedy actress creating her own company, and performed at teatro de la Zarzuela in Madrid with Manuel del Río, and at teatro Alcázar in Barcelona. Her last performance was with Paco Martínez Soria, going across all provinces in Spain and retiring in 1950. She died on 4 November 1970 in Madrid due to a liver disease at the age of 70. Together they worked with Mercedes Serós, Amalia de Isaura and Custodia Romero, between others.

== Filmography ==
- La chica del gato (1927), as dancer
- El aventurero misterioso (1918)
- La leyenda del cementerio (1917)
- Ensueños (1917)
