= Minnesota Clay =

1964 film directed by Sergio Corbucci

- Italian film poster
- Directed by: Sergio Corbucci
- Screenplay by: Adriano Bolzoni; Sergio Corbucci; José Gutiérrez Maesso
- Produced by: Turi Vasile
- Starring: Cameron Mitchell; Georges Rivière; Ethel Rojo; Diana Martín; Fernando Sancho; Antonio Casas; Antonio Roso; Julio Peña
- Cinematography: José F. Aguayo
- Edited by: Franco Fraticelli
- Music by: Piero Piccioni
- Production companies: Ultra Film-Sicilia Cinematografica; Jaguar Films; Franco London Film
- Distributed by: Titanus
- Release dates: 12 November 1964 (Italy); 22 February 1965 (Spain); 9 March 1966 (France)
- Running time: 90 minutes
- Countries: Italy; Spain; France
- Language: Italian

Minnesota Clay is a 1964 Spaghetti Western directed by Sergio Corbucci.

== Plot ==
The year is 1883. Clay, a gunfighter with health problems is interned in Drunner Labor Camp. He's determined to prove his innocence since he was framed by Fox, the current Sheriff of Clay's former home of Mesa Encantada. Fox has subsequently been hired by the townspeople to protect them from Ortiz and his bandits. Instead, Fox now runs a protection racket, extorting and terrorizing the complacent citizens, threatening them with violence if they do not pay exorbitant taxes to him. Clay rides out to meet Ortiz, who tries to hire him to kill Fox.

Ortiz's mistress Estella, whom Clay saved earlier from an attack by Fox's men, lets Clay escape the Ortiz encampment. She tells him Clay stole gold from him, prompting Ortiz and his gang to seek out Clay. This enables Fox to ambush both of them. Fox kills Ortiz and captures Clay. She helps Clay escape and, despite losing his sight, manages to decimate Fox's gang one by one. Realizing he is unable to see clearly, Fox seeks him out in one of the town's stables and tries to lure him into shooting his own daughter, Nancy during the final showdown.

In an epilogue in only European prints of the film, the military guards from Drunner Labor Camp pay Jonathan a large sum of money for getting rid of Fox and Oritz. As they ride away, Clay emerges and speaks with Jonathan then rides away, removes his glasses tosses them into the air and fires a single bullet through the lenses. In the English version, the film ends shortly after Clay fires on Fox and falls to the ground. He confesses to them about their relationship and instructs her to collect the $10,000 reward for his capture, then dies.

== Cast ==
- Cameron Mitchell as Minnesota Clay
- Georges Rivière as Fox
- Ethel Rojo as Estella
- Diana Martín as Nancy Mulligan
- Antonio Roso (as Anthony Ross) as Mudo
- Fernando Sancho as General Domingo Ortiz
- Antonio Casas as Jonathan Mulligan
- Gino Pernice as Scratchy
- Joe Kamel as Millicet
- Ferdinando Poggi as Tubbs
- Pietro Tordi as Barman
- Julio Peña as Dr. Stevens

== Production ==
Although Minnesota Clay has been listed as being shot in Spain, film historian Tim Lucas has stated that upon examination of the film, very little was actually shot there, with the possibility of only two scenes involving actor Fernando Sancho and his character's crew. The bulk of the story takes place either in or outside the saloon or in/outside Jonathan's farmhouse, both of which were shot at the studios of Elios Film near Rome. Shooting took place between September and October 1964.

Cameron Mitchell recalled that Mario Bava was on set to assist Corbucci. Lucas has suggested that Bava assisted with the film's cinematography and the final shootout sequence.

== Release ==
Minnesota Clay was one of the first Spaghetti Westerns released in Rome after the surprise success of A Fistful of Dollars. The film earned 400 million lire, substantially less than A Fistful of Dollars, which grossed 3.182 billion lire.

The film's English-dubbed version was created in Rome. Aside from looping his own performance, Mitchell provided the voices of both Georges Riviere and Antonio Casas. Lucas critiqued the rest of the dubbing as "fairly atrocious", noting that Diana Martin's performance suffered particularly. The film was released in the United States and the United Kingdom in 1966 and 1967 respectively. According to Lucas, the film became one of the hardest Italian Westerns to see after 1968, with the film eventually getting a Japanese DVD release on Imagica's "Macaroni Western Library".
