= Tabitha Nauser =

Singaporean singer (born 1992)

- Born: 23 February 1992 (age 34)
- Origin: Singapore
- Genres: Dance-pop, soul, R&B
- Occupation: Singer
- Years active: 2009—present
- Label: Sony Music Entertainment
- Website: www.tabithanauser.com

Tabitha Nauser (born 23 February 1992) is a Singaporean singer.

Nauser was born to a Swiss father and a Singaporean Indian mother. In 2009, Nauser placed third in the third edition of Singapore Idol.

In 2017, Nauser's song “Bulletproof” peaked at number 1 on Spotify's "SG Viral 50" chart and number 4 on the iTunes "SG Top Charts".

Nauser's second single "Body Language" in September 2017 featured Malaysian rapper SonaOne.

Nauser also acted the role of Mimi Marquez in the Pangdemonium musical production of RENT. She has also performed at festivals such as the Mosaic Music Festival, Shine Festival, Music Matters Singapore, and the F1 Singapore Grand Prix. She also performed in Washington DC for the after-party to the White House State Dinner for Singapore.

In 2018, Nauser collaborated with Dutch DJ Trap Duo Yellow Claw, producing the track “Crash This Party”. Later in 2018, she worked with Grammy-nominated producer and songwriter Michael Fatkin for her single "Rules" released in May 2018. Nauser also opened for the singer Khalid for his Asian leg of the “American Teen World Tour”.

In 2019, Tabitha released "Don't Let Me Drown", produced by Sacha Skarbek. Nauser's debut EP Things I should have said was also released in 2019.

She also appeared on the television show Singapore Social.
