= Singapore Social =

Singaporean television series

- Genre: Docuseries
- Starring: Sukki Singapora; Nicole Ong; Mae Tan; Paul Foster; Vinny Sharp; Tabitha Nauser
- Country of origin: United States
- Original language: English
- No. of series: 1
- No. of episodes: 8

Production
- Production locations: United States, Singapore
- Running time: 45 minutes
- Production company: Love Productions

Original release
- Network: Netflix
- Release: 22 November 2019

Singapore Social is an unscripted docuseries set in Singapore and broadcast by Netflix. The Netflix Originals television series follows the lives of young successful Singaporeans as they defy expectations and traverse the tricky terrain of career, romance and family in Singapore and briefly, Los Angeles. It is notable for being the first docuseries with an all-Asian cast based in Asia for global release.

== Series ==
Year	Series	Number of episodes
2019	Series 1	8

=== Series 1 (2019) ===
The first series aired on 22 November 2019 on Netflix and spanned a total of 8 episodes. The show was first announced in November 2019 with the first full-length trailer airing 8 November 2019.

This series introduced the cast: Sukki Singapora, Nicole Ong, Mae Tan, Paul Foster, Tabitha Nauser and Vinny Sharp.

== Cultural impact ==
Singapore Social has been widely acknowledged for its role in representation in the mainstream entertainment industry. Whilst it is broadly considered a subgenre of reality television, when it comes to representation internationally, especially in America, the show does add diversity to the reality TV genre, which still lacks Asian representation.

== Local controversy ==
Immediately after the show released, Singapore Social received backlash online from local Singapore netizens. Some online critics felt that the show did an inaccurate job of representing life in Singapore, especially since Singapore is largely middle-class, yet others have pointed out that this backlash is a double standard considering there are many Western shows from this genre and therefore Singapore should be allowed to produce a similar format for a global audience. Following the initial backlash, local reviews now seem to be mixed, with many agreeing that whilst it may not portray all Singaporeans, unlike the film Crazy Rich Asians, Singapore Social does succeed in representing a more diverse cast of Asians, particularly those of South-Asian origin.
