= Vidette, British Columbia =

Coordinates: 51°10′00″N 120°54′00″W

Vidette is an unincorporated locality in the Deadman River Valley in the Thompson-Bonaparte Country region of the Central Interior of British Columbia, Canada. It is just north of Vidette Lake, which has become famous for being declared the "Centre of the Universe" by Tibetan Buddhist monks. The locality's name derives from the French spoken by fur trades, when a roadhouse here was on the Hudson's Bay Brigade Trail connecting Fort Kamloops to Fort Alexandria via the Bonaparte Plateau, and which became part of the Gold Rush Trail from the United States to the Cariboo Gold Rush.
