= Sukki Singapora =

Burlesque performer and activist

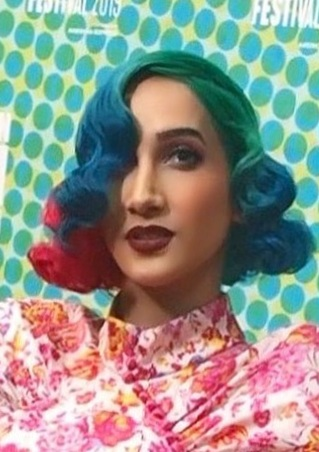
- Sukki Singapora, in 2019
- Born: Sukki Menon; 20 October 1989; Singapore
- Occupations: Burlesque performer, Activist
- Years active: 2011 – present
- Website: sukkisingapora.com

Sukki Singapora (born Sukki Menon, in Singapore) is a burlesque performer and activist. She is best known for being the first international burlesque performer from Singapore. She was awarded an "Asian Women of Achievement Award" for her views on freedom of expression for women in socially restrictive countries. Her television debut came in 2019 with the first docu series with an all Asian cast launching globally via Netflix, Singapore Social.

Her career choice as a burlesque performer, despite her stringent cultural background, has gained her a large international fanbase, leading to her founding The Singapore Burlesque Society in 2012 to protect primarily Asian women wanting to pursue a career in burlesque.

== Early life ==
Singapora was born to a Singaporean Indian father with Malayali roots in Kerala, and an English mother, both doctors. She has two sisters. While young, her father moved the family to Cornwall, although she spent her childhood in a small Indian Singaporean community around the Goodman Road area in Singapore and was brought up with traditional Asian values. As a child, she trained in classical ballet. She became a British citizen at 18 and attended the University of Nottingham. After graduation, she worked in the IT industry.

== Career ==
In February 2011, she auditioned for a part in a cabaret theatre near Manchester and was hired as one of the dancers. She was slowly given more solos and was offered other gigs; "I was fortunate enough to be offered enough shows that I no longer needed a day job."

Singapora's burlesque performances are noted for being lavish with elaborate costumes and a Bollywood-influenced style. Her emphasis is on sensuality and fusing Western and Eastern styles with a particular nod to classic Hollywood glamour and inspiration from Barbara Yung, a 1950s American-Chinese performer.

She gained global recognition appearing in Esquire as "Women We Love", FHM India and the front cover of international burlesque magazine Burlesque Bible and in 2013 her performances were praised for their daring attitude.

In 2019 she made her television debut with the Netflix docu-series Singapore Social.

She is also an activist who campaigns for women's rights.

=== Burlesque as activism ===
Singapora became the world's first burlesque artist to be welcomed to Buckingham Palace for tea in celebration of her contribution to the arts as an Asian role model. She has observed a taboo and dislike of burlesque among the Asian community and has attempted to overcome prejudices and misconceptions about the performance style and to inspire others to experience it. She commented on her activism for Asian women, "This is not just an opportunity to prove that Burlesque can make a difference, it is a responsibility.”
