= Vidette Lake =

Lake in British Columbia, Canada

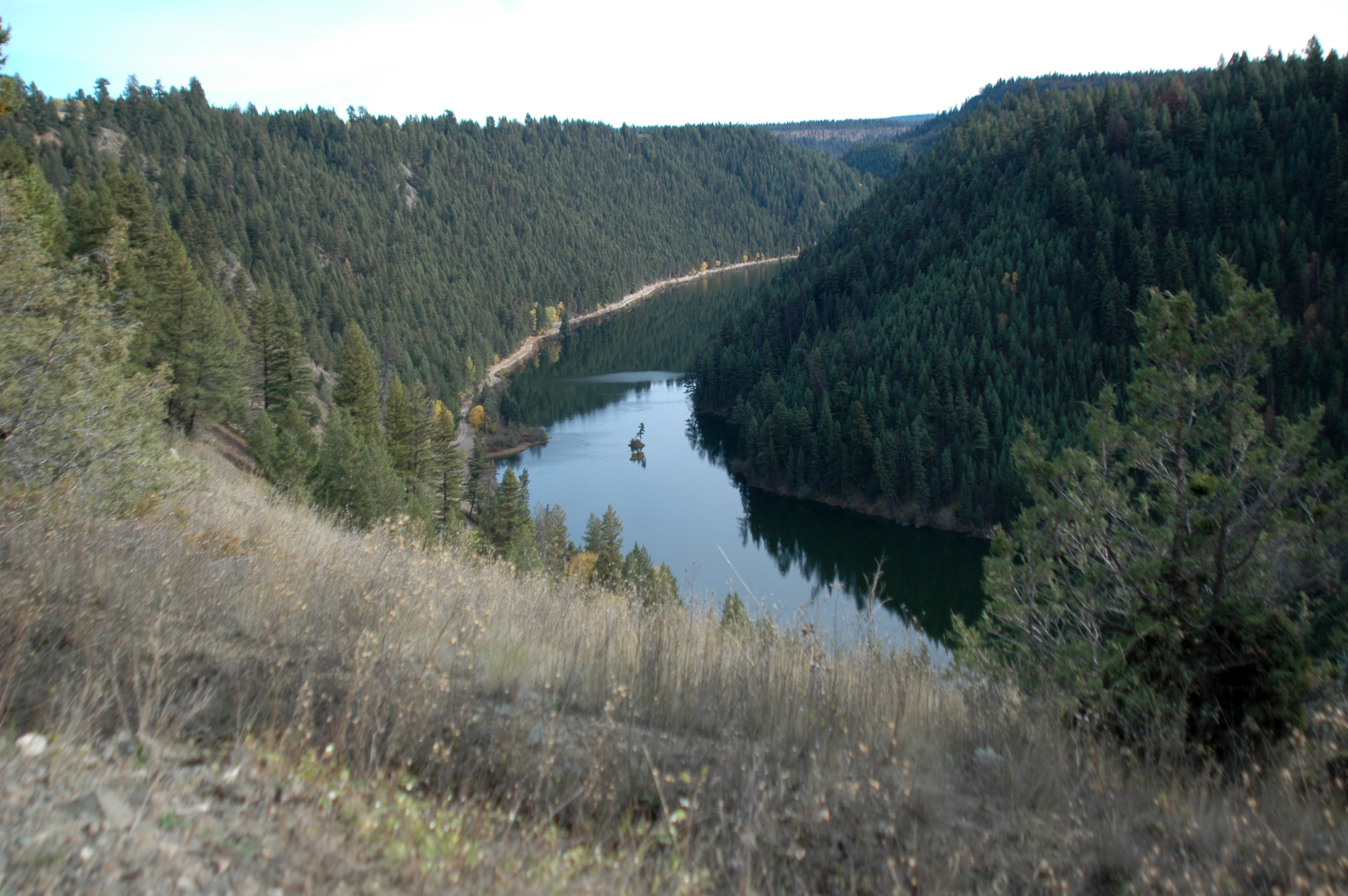

- Location within British Columbia
- Location: British Columbia
- Coordinates: 51.15°N 120.9°W
- Primary inflows: Hamilton Creek
- Primary outflows: Hamilton Creek
- Basin countries: Canada
- Settlements: near Savona, B.C.

Vidette Lake is a small lake in the Deadman River Valley of the Thompson Country in the Interior of British Columbia, Canada. It is not on the Deadman River, but it is on a tributary within the river's valley.

== History ==
The route in the gold rush era from Kamloops to the Cariboo goldfields passed the lake. A cabin, which is now the home of a tourist lodge on the lake, was a trading post on the Hudson's Bay Brigade Trail.

From 1933 to 1939, the Vidette Lake Mine operated on the east side of the lake producing 28,869 oz of gold, 46,573 oz of silver and 48 tons of copper. In the years since there has been further exploration.

== Centre of the Universe ==
The lake has been visited and investigated by Tibetan Buddhist monks who have declared a location overlooking the lake to be the "Centre of the Universe." The owner of the property operates a guest lodge, the Vidette Lake Gold Mine Fishing Lodge, for people wishing to visit the site, which is unmarked.

== See also ==
- List of lakes of British Columbia
- Vidette, British Columbia
