= USCGC Vidette =

History

United States
- Name: USCGC Vidette
- Builder: Essington Company, Pennsylvania
- Completed: 1913
- Acquired: 3 May 1919 or 1 July 1919
- Fate: See note
- Notes: Operated as private yacht Howarda 1913-1917; Served in United States Navy as patrol boat USS Howarda (SP-144) 1917-1919

General characteristics
- Type: United States Coast Guard Cutter
- Displacement: 38 tons
- Length: 75 ft (23 m)
- Beam: 16 ft (4.9 m)
- Draft: 3 ft 4 in (1.02 m)
- Propulsion: Gasoline engine
- Speed: 9 knots
- Armor: 1 gun

USCGC Vidette was a United States Coast Guard Cutter commissioned in 1919.

Vidette was built as the wooden-hulled civilian yacht Howarda in 1913 by the Essington Company in Essington, Pennsylvania. The U.S. Navy acquired Howarda in 1917 for use as a patrol boat during World War I. She served in the Navy as USS Howarda (SP-144) until 1919.

The Navy transferred Howarda to the United States Department of the Treasury for use by the United States Coast Guard on 3 May 1919 or 1 July 1919. Commissioned as USCGC Vidette, she served at Key West, Florida. On 1 January 1929 she was transferred to Miami, Florida.

Vidette's further career and fate are unclear. The United States Coast Guard Historian's Office states that she was sold on 28 July 1922, but clearly she remained in Coast Guard service through at least 1929. She probably was sold sometime in the 1930s.
