= Deerhorn Mountain =

Peak in the Sierra Nevada in Tulare County, California

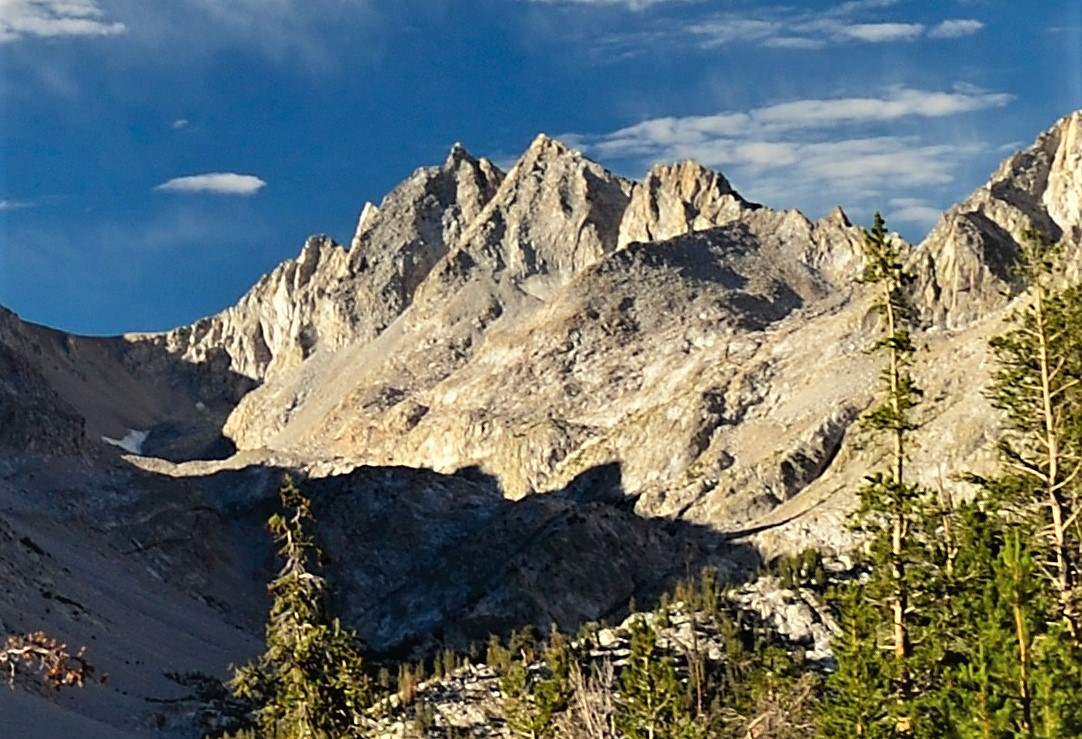

Highest point
- Elevation: 13,264 ft (4,043 m)
- Prominence: 617 ft (188 m)
- Parent peak: Mount Stanford
- Isolation: 0.63 mi (1.01 km)
- Listing: SPS Mountaineers Peak
- Coordinates: 36°42′47″N 118°24′38″W

Geography
- Location within California
- Parent range: Sierra Nevada
- Topo map: USGS Mount Brewer

Climbing
- First ascent: Norman Clyde

Deerhorn Mountain is a 13,264-foot (4,043 m) peak in the Sierra Nevada in Tulare County, California. It is located along the Kings-Kern Divide in the southern part of Kings Canyon National Park.

According to Place Names of the Sierra Nevada (Peter Browning), it was "named in 1895 by J. N. LeConte because of the resemblance of its double summit to two horns."

== See also ==
- List of mountain peaks of California
