= Hay que romper la rutina =

1974 film by Enrique Cahen Salaberry

- Release date: 1974
- Running time: 90 minute
- Country: Argentina
- Language: Spanish

Hay que romper la rutina is a 1974 Argentine film.
