= Vedette (sentry) =

Early warning soldier or military unit

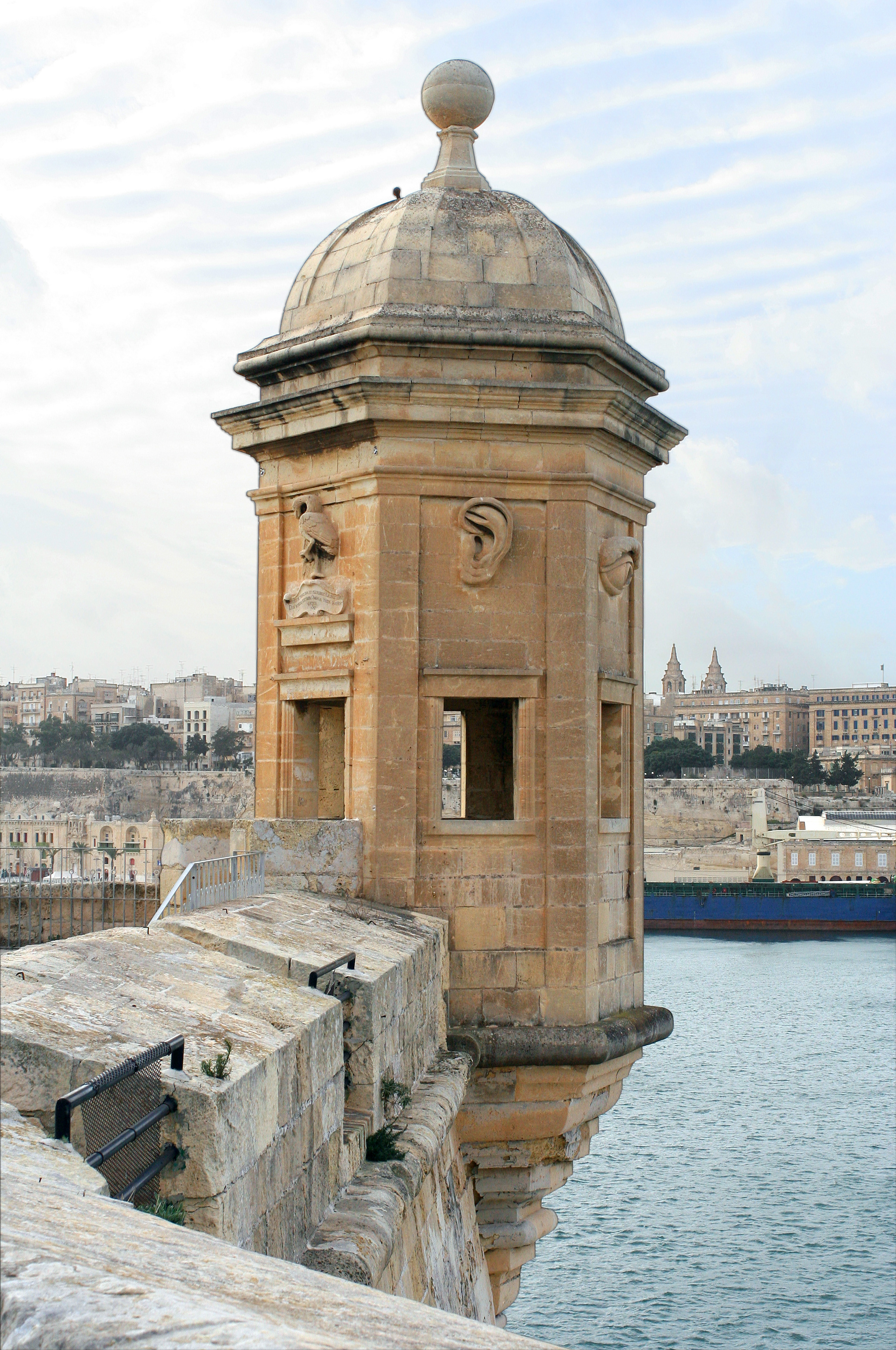
Gardjola is a type of vedette. (Senglea, Malta)

A vedette is a mounted sentry or picket, who has the function of bringing information, giving signals or warnings of danger, etc., to a main body of troops. (Note: The word originated as a French military term vedette (formed from Latin videre, to see) (Chisholm 1911), also spelled vidette.) In modern terms, the soldiers who man listening-posts are the equivalent of vedettes.

== Naval ==
Navies use the term vedette to refer to a small scouting or patrol boat.

The term has also been used for specific naval vessels (see USS Vedette), and a class of flying boat (see Canadian Vickers Vedette).

== Structures ==
All around Salisbury Plain in southern England, the roads connecting the plain with the surrounding countryside feature brick-built guard-posts, staffed by security officers whenever there is military activity beyond such points. They are known as vedettes, and each one is named for a local geographic feature.

The Gardjola is a prominent guard tower on Maltese forts in Malta and an example of a vedette. It may be referred to in French as an échauguette.
