= Breeskin =

Breeskin is a surname. Notable people with the surname include:

- Adelyn Dohme Breeskin (1896–1986), American curator, museum director, and art historian
- Elias Breeskin (1896–1969), violinist, composer and conductor
- Olga Breeskin (born 1951), Mexican violinist, dancer and actress
