= Wanda Seux =

Paraguayan-born Mexican vedette (1948–2020)

- Born: Juana Amanda Seux Ramírez; January 3, 1948; Paraguay
- Died: September 2, 2020 (aged 72); Mexico
- Occupations: vedette Actress dancer
- Years active: 1973-2020

Juana Amanda Seux Ramírez (3 January 1948 – 2 September 2020), better known as Wanda Seux, was a Paraguayan-Mexican vedette, dancer, and actress, who enjoyed a long career in film, television, and theatre in Mexico.

== Biography ==
Wanda Seux was born in Paraguay, but as a child she moved with her family to the Argentine province of Salta. Her family was of Syrian and Lebanese origins. She married at the age of 23 following a family custom.

At age 11, she was invited to participate in a beauty contest for young girls. She began to practice as a model in Orán, province of Salta. She studied and became an English teacher. At the age of 18, she moved to Buenos Aires, where she got a job as a dancer of Arab dances in a restaurant. She went from being a dancer to a half-vedette. She debuted in 1973 with Nélida Lobato and Zulma Faiad in the Teatro Nacional Cervantes in a revue called Escándalos. After a while she traveled to Venezuela where she received an invitation to perform a tour in Mexico.

She arrived in Mexico in 1976 as a vedette, but with a different proposal, since her show was Las Vegas style and emulated the shows offered by figures like Shirley MacLaine or Liza Minnelli. It was said that her production cost a total of nine thousand dollars. Her spectacular costumes were made directly from Argentina, with the modistas of the Teatro Nacional. In her first shows, Seux was accompanied by some of the Bluebell Girls of Le Lido of Paris.

Wanda was known as "The Golden Bomb" and was considered the Barbie of the vedettes because of her blonde hair and stylized figure. Her shows included varieties such as knife throwers and fireballs. Seux was the star of the El Capri cabaret at the Regis Hotel in Mexico City. From there she jumped to the Folies Bergère and then, for four years, she was the star of Marrakesh, owned by Televisa.

She debuted in cinema in 1978 in the film El Arracadas, with the singer Vicente Fernández. She acted in other movies within the so-called Mexican sex comedy of the 1970s and 1980s. She debuted in television in 1985 in the telenovela Salón de belleza. Over the next few years, she has appeared regularly on telenovelas and unit programs in Mexico.

In 1999, Seux participated in the theatrical show Las inolvidables de la noche, with the vedettes Rossy Mendoza, Amira Cruzat, Grace Renat and Malú Reyes. In 2009, she appeared at the age of 60 in Playboy magazine. In that same year she created the character Super Wanda, as part of the cast of the TV show La Oreja.

In 2016, Seux, along with other vedettes like Olga Breeskin, Rossy Mendoza, Lyn May and Princesa Yamal, starred in the documentary film Beauties of the Night, by the filmmaker María José Cuevas.

In 2017, Seux co-starred in the stage play Divas por siempre, alongside comedian Shanik Berman, comedian Manuel Valdés and also vedettes Lyn May, Grace Renat and Princesa Yamal.

=== Personal life ===
In February 2010, Seux was diagnosed with breast cancer. She required a protocol of chemotherapy, radiotherapy, biological therapy and surgery. In 2012 she was free of the disease.

She was a faithful defender of animals and cared for more than 44 pets at her home.

Seux died on 2 September 2020, at the age of 72. After being diagnosed with breast cancer in 2010, she suffered multiple strokes in the last two years of her life.

== Filmography ==
- 1978: El Arracadas
- 1978: La hora del jaguar
- 1979: La Vida Difícil de una Mujer Fácil
- 1980: A fuego lento
- 1981: El Macho Biónico como una Invitada a la Fiesta
- 1982: La golfa del barrio
- 1983: Chile picante (en el segmento "Los Compadres")
- 1983: Buenas, y con ... movidas
- 1984: Entre ficheras Anda el diablo - La pulquería 3
- 1987: Que buena está mi ahijada
- 1988: Central Camionera
- 1990: El lechero del barrio
- 1990: Objetos Sexuales
- 1997: Masacre nocturna
- 2009: Paradas continuas
- 2013: Perdona nuestras ofensas (cortometraje)
- 2016: Beauties of the Night (documentary)

== Television ==
- 1977: Variedades de media noche
- 1985: Salón de Belleza
- 1990: Alcanzar Una Estrella
- 1991: Alcanzar Una Estrella II
- 2009: La oreja
- 2010: Muévete
- 2010: Los Sicarios
- 2010: Atrevete a soñar
- 2011: Hasta que el dinero nos separe

== Theatre ==
- 1974: Colitas pintadas, Teatro Nacional de Argentina
- Las inolvidables de la noche, in the Teatro Blanquita
- 2011: Vestida a la orden
- 2017: Divas por siempre
