= Rossy Mendoza =

Mexican actress and dancer (1945–2023)

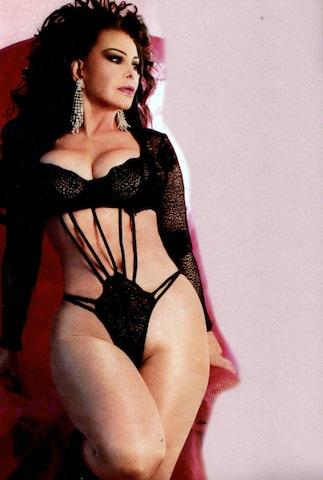
- Mendoza in 1985
- Born: María del Rosario Mendoza Chávez; 6 June 1945; Ixtlan Del Rio, Nayarit, Mexico
- Died: 29 December 2023 (aged 78); Mexico City
- Occupations: Vedette; actress; dancer
- Years active: 1964–2023

María del Rosario Mendoza Chávez (stage name Rossy Mendoza; 6 June 1945 – 29 December 2023) was a Mexican vedette, actress, dancer, and singer. During the 1970s–1980s, she was one of the highest grossing artists in the Mexican sex comedy film genre.

== Biography ==
Rossy Mendoza was born on 6 June 1945 in Vícam, one of eight Yaqui villages in the south of the Mexican state of Sonora. She began her career in the mid-1960s when she was still a teenager, slowly making a name for herself in the entertainment industry by performing in the main cabarets of Sonora. She also appeared in well known Mexican magazines including Cinelandia, Cine mundial and Siempre. In the late 1960s her physique became athletic and voluptuous, in contrast to the slimness it had in her early years, and she had cosmetic surgery on her nose to improve her facial appearance.

In 1964 she made her first appearance at the Teatro Lírico in Mexico City, where other prominent figures such as Tin Tan, El Santo and Sergio Corona performed.

In 1968 she joined the cast of the cabaret El Capri, where she worked alongside vedettes such as Yolanda "Tongolele" Montes and the Argentine Zulma Faiad. She appeared in several television programmes such as Sabadito Alegre, with Paco Malgesto, where she remained for several months. In 1970 she worked with the comedian Adalberto Martínez (better known as "Resortes") in El Tenorio Comico at the Blanquita Theater in Mexico City. She appeared there for many seasons, accompanied by an orchestra and a ballet of 18 dancers. Her performances alternated with singers such as Celia Cruz, Enrique Guzmán, Mike Laure, Sonia Lopez and Dámaso Pérez Prado. At the same time she was hired by the Vallejo Family to perform in La Caravan Corona, in which she appeared from 1971 to 1982. This consisted of groups of stars from the show that traveled throughout Mexico and in which she performed with acts such as Los Polivoces (Eduardo Manzano and Enrique Cuenca), Juan Gabriel, Amalia Mendoza and Los Rebeldes del Rock. In 1971 she began a successful season at the El Clóset nightclub, where she shared top billing with the vedette Olga Breeskin. She also ventured into the fotonovelas of the time and recorded some records.

By the end of the 1970s she was already a big star in cabarets and nightclubs, earning the title of Supervedette or Primera Vedette. She headed the cabaret show Terraza Casino, accompanied by the Hector Halal orchestra. She also worked at El Cadillac, El Rondinella, El Clóset, Las Galaxias, El Can Can and El Quid, among other places.

Represented by her artistic agent, Lonka Becker, she made her film debut in 1970 with the actor Gaspar Henaine (known professionally as "Capulina") in the film Capulina contra los Vampiros. In 1971, she appeared in the film El sinvergüenza along with Mauricio Garcés. In her film career she appeared in more than 52 films with stars such as Vicente Fernández, Andrés García, Jorge Rivero, Julio Alemán, Mario Almada, Ana Luisa Peluffo and Isela Vega.

In the theatre she acted in several comic plays, in which she was directed by Óscar Ortiz de Pinedo, Rafael Banquells, Jose Diaz Morales and others. Her first stage play was with the comedians Emilio Brillas and Polo Ortín. She toured Mexico in the play Elena para los miercoles, with Jorge Ortiz de Pinedo. Another of her more notable stage plays was La locura del sexo with Andrés García.

On television she appeared in the telenovela Yara with Angélica María in 1979. She also took part in the popular television show Variedades de medianoche with Manuel Valdés.

In the 1990s her appearances were sporadic. In 1993 she returned to the Blanquita Theater, to appear on a bill with the dance band La Sonora Matancera. At the end of the decade she was diagnosed with cancer. In 1999, Mendoza took part in the theater show Las inolvidables de la noche, in which the vedettes Amira Cruzat, Wanda Seux, Grace Renat and Malú Reyes also appeared.

Mendoza also modelled for photographers such as Nadine Markova and Paulina Lavista as well as the painter José Luis Cuevas. Other artists that have painted her include Ricardo Garcia Mora and Juan Buitimea, a member of the Yaqui indigenous people.

In 2016 Mendoza, along with the vedettes Olga Breeskin, Lyn May, Wanda Seux and Princesa Yamal, was the subject of the Mexican documentary film Beauties of the Night directed by María José Cuevas.

The Cuban musician Dámaso Pérez Prado composed the Mambo "The Waist of Rossy" in honor of her slim figure.

Mendoza died from a heart attack on 29 December 2023, at the age of 78.

== Filmography ==
- Lanza tus penas al viento (1966)
- Capulina Contra Los Vampiros (1970)
- El sinvergüenza (1971)
- El Festin De La Loba (1972)
- Santo Contra Los Secuestradores (1972)
- Tu Camino Y El Mío (1973)
- El Imponente (1973)
- Los Perros De Dios (1974)
- Santo en Oro Negro (1975)
- El Mar (1977)
- La llamada del sexo (1977)
- Sweetly You'll Die Through Love (1977)
- El Sexo Sentido (1980)
- California Dancing Club (1981)
- El Vecindario (1981)
- Pistoleros Famosos (1982)
- El Ratero De la Vecindad (1983)
- El Día Del Compadre (1983)
- Esos Viejos Rabo Verdes (1983)
- El Sexo De Los Pobres (1983)
- El Día De Los Albañiles (1984)
- Juana la Cantinera (1984)
- Los Verduleros (1984)
- Los Gatos de las Azoteas (1985)
- El Ratero De La Vecindad 2 (1985)
- Tres Mexicanos Ardientes (1986)
- Duro Y Parejo En La Casita Del Pecado (1987)
- ¡Qué Buena Está Mi Ahijada! (1987)
- Todos Abordo (2010)
- Beauties of the Night (2016)
