= Grace Renat =

Mexican vedette, actress and dancer

- Born: Graciela Prior Marín; 1949 (age 76–77); Veracruz, Mexico
- Occupations: Vedette; actress; dancer
- Years active: 1973–present
- Children: 1

Graciela Prior Marín (born 1949), better known as Grace Renat, is a Mexican vedette, actress and dancer. She was one of the most popular Mexican vedettes during the 1970s and 1980s.

== Biography ==
Renat was born in Veracruz, Mexico. At fourteen, she ran away from home with her first boyfriend. It was precisely her sisters, who convinced her to enter the world of entertainment by supplanting a chorus girl from a set where they danced. With this group, Renat undertook a tour through all Mexico. Already with a son in tow, Grace achieved fame as vedette in the city of Tijuana.

In 1973, she was named "Goddess of the Night" by the Mexican Actor's Guild. She worked for several seasons at the famous Blanquita Theater in Mexico City, as well as in the famous cabaret El Capri, at the Hotel Regis in the same city. She debuted in cinema in 1974 in the film El desconocido. In 1976 she was part of the cast of the film Zona Roja, directed by Emilio Fernández. In 1979 she gained popularity by its participation in the film Estas ruinas que ves, of Julian Pastor.

In the 1980s, she starred in comedy programs on Televisa as Mis huéspedes and Papá soltero.

In theater, Renat participated in diverse montages, including the comedy El tenorio comico, with the comedian Manuel Valdés.

In 1999, Renat participated in the theater show Las inolvidables de la noche, with the also vedettes Rossy Mendoza, Wanda Seux, Amira Cruzat and Malú Reyes. In 2017, Renat co-starred in the play Divas por siempre, next to comedians Shanik Berman, Manuel Valdés and also vedettes Lyn May, Wanda Seux and Princesa Yamal.

== Filmography ==
=== Films ===
- El desconocido (1974)
- Albures mexicanos (1975)
- Zona Roja (1976)
- Muerte a sangre fría (1978)
- Que te vaya bonito (1978)
- Guerra de sexos (1978)
- Perros callejeros II (1979)
- Llámenme Mike (1979)
- Estas ruinas que ves (1979)
- 4 hembras y un macho menos (1979)
- Sexo contra sexo (1980)
- Hilario Cortés, el rey del talón (1980)
- Mírame con ojos pornográficos (1980)
- Las cabareteras (1980)
- El hombre sin miedo (1980)
- Cuentos colorados (1980)
- La cosecha de mujeres (1981)
- Las muñecas del "King Kong" (1981)
- La furia de los karatecas (1982)
- El puño de la muerte (1982)
- Las computadoras (1982)
- El sexo de los pobres (1983)
- Terror en los barrios (1983)
- Se me sale cuando me río (1983)
- Las perfumadas (1983)
- Perico el de los palotes (1984)
- Llegamos los fregamos y nos fuimos (1985)
- Las limpias (1987)
- Más buenas que el pan (1987)
- Piquete que va derecho (1988)
- Mi pistola y tus esposas (1989)
- E pajaro tata (1991)

=== Television ===
- Variedades de media noche (1977)
- Mis huéspedes (1980)
- Hogar dulce hogar (1982)
- Soltero en el aire (1984)
- Salón de belleza (1985)
- Papá soltero (1992)
