= Beauties of the Night =

Beauties of the Night may refer to:

- Beauties of the Night (1952 film), a French-language fantasy film
- Beauties of the Night (2016 film), a Mexican documentary film
