= Princesa Yamal =

Argentine-Mexican actress

- Born: Isabel Camila Masiero; Mendoza, Argentina
- Occupations: Vedette, actress, dancer
- Years active: 1974–present

Isabel Camila Masiero (born 1946), better known by her stage name Princesa Yamal, is an Argentine-Mexican vedette, actress and dancer. She was one of the most popular vedettes during the 1970s and 1980s in Mexico.

== Career ==
She arrived in Mexico in 1977 contracted by Ramón Bugarini, a famous businessman of the time. At that time she worked in Panama, where she was the main star in the famous Playboy nightclub. Before settling in Mexico, she had offers to work in Japan, Milan and Miami. She refused to work in Italy, since one of her uncles was a priest in that country. She debuted in Mexico City in the famous nightclub El 77, sharing credits with the vedette Amira Cruzat. The show of Princesa Yamal was different from those presented in Mexico at that time. Her specialty was the Arab dances. (Yamal is an Arabic word meaning beauty.) She also appeared in a few Mexican sex comedy films as well in popular magazines.

In 1985, she was involved in the robbery of the National Museum of Anthropology of Mexico and was given a two-year prison sentence.

Currently, Princesa Yamal lives in Acapulco, where she performs beauty treatments.

In 2016, Princesa Yamal, along with other vedettes like Olga Breeskin, Rossy Mendoza, Lyn May and Wanda Seux appeared in the documentary film Beauties of the Night, by filmmaker María José Cuevas. Cuevas revealed that it was a meeting that she had with Princesa Yamal in 2006, which motivated her to realize the film project.

== Filmography ==
=== Films ===
- Carnival Nights (1978)
- La vida difícil de una mujer fácil (1979)
- Las nenas del amor (1983)
- Macho que ladra no muerde (1984)
- Los plomeros y las ficheras (1988)
- El rey de las ficheras (1989)
- A garrote limpio (1989)
- Beauties of the Night (2016)

=== Television ===
- Variedades de medianoche (1977)
