= Sweetly You'll Die Through Love =

- Directed by: Tulio Demicheli
- Written by: Fernando Orozco
- Starring: Andrés García; Rossy Mendoza; George Hilton
- Cinematography: Rafael Pacheco; Douglas Sandoval
- Edited by: Gaby Peñalba
- Production companies: Atlas Films; Huracán Films
- Distributed by: Alianza Cinematográfica Española
- Release date: 25 June 1977
- Running time: 88 minutes
- Countries: Mexico; Spain
- Language: Spanish

Sweetly You'll Die Through Love (Spanish:Dulcemente morirás por amor or La llamada del sexo) is a 1977 thriller film directed by Tulio Demicheli and starring Andrés Garcia, Rossy Mendoza and George Hilton. An international co-production between Mexico and Spain.

== Cast ==
- Andrés García as Víctor
- Rossy Mendoza as Mónica
- George Hilton as Carlos
- Verónica Miriel as Karin
- Claudia Gravy as Gloria
- Eduardo Fajardo as Sr. Montero
- Frank Braña as Hermano de Víctor
- Franklin Domínguez
- Augusto Feria
- Teddy Beltrán
- César Olmos
- Liliano Angulo
- Licena de Bas
- Eduardo García

== Bibliography ==
- John King & Nissa Torrents. The Garden of Forking Paths: Argentine Cinema. British Film Institute, 1988.
