= Nora la rebelde =

- Directed by: Mauricio de la Serna
- Written by: Raúl Zenteno; Fabián Arnaud
- Produced by: Jorge Camargo; Juan Filcer
- Starring: Olga Breeskin; Andrés García
- Cinematography: Carlos Martel
- Edited by: Raúl J. Casso
- Music by: Nacho Méndez
- Production company: Televicine
- Distributed by: Televicine
- Release date: 20 December 1979 (Mexico)
- Running time: 90 minutes
- Country: Mexico
- Language: Spanish

Nora la rebelde (in English "Nora the Rebel") is a 1979 Mexican comedy film directed by Mauricio de la Serna and starring Olga Breeskin and Andrés García.

== Plot ==
Nora is a beautiful music student who wants to be a violinist like her late father, but finds out that people focus more on her stunning good looks than her talent, much to her chagrin. When she finds out that the virtuous Bulgarian orchestra director Sándor Horváth is coming to Mexico, she will do the impossible to meet him in person, and on the way, she will be involved in a hilarious series of accidents caused by her looks. In the meantime, a neighbor of hers, the dentist Gerardo, will try to confess to her a couple of things that will end up making her reflect on life and love.

== Cast ==
- Olga Breeskin as Nora Pérez
- Andrés García as Dr. Gerardo
- Amparo Arozamena as Beatriz viuda de Pérez
- Alejandro Ciangherotti
- Eugenia Avendaño
- Carlos Monden as Television actor
- María Prado as Wife of Melitón Cabadas
- Sergio Guzik as Eduardo, Nora's suitor
- Anaís de Melo as Nora's classmate at music school (uncredited)
- José Roberto Hill as Young man in public phone line (uncredited)

== Production ==
Released on 1979, the film meant the return of Mauricio de la Serna as director after 15 years of retirement, after the failure of his previous film Furia en el Edén (1964); when consulted in an interview about his long absence from the world of cinema, he declared that he did it "because the pornography and churrismo [referring to churro, a term used for a low-budget film] were bursting me", alluding to the Mexican sex comedy genre then prevailing in the film industry of Mexico.

Originally the film went under the working title Todos queremos ver a Nora ("We all want to see Nora"), paraphrasing the song "Todos queremos ver a Olga", with which star Olga Breeskin opened her vedette shows.

== Reception ==
The film was subject of a negative review by Paco Ignacio Taibo I, who in a review for Proceso magazine titled El asesinato de un proyecto de estrella ("The murder of a star project"), summed up his views on the film saying, "I think that direction does not exist in Nora la rebelde, and that there is no criterion of elemental sanity either; everything is vulgar and outdated, without style and without grace."
