= 1985 National Museum of Anthropology theft =

Museum robbery in Mexico

On December 25, 1985, in the very early hours of the morning, two veterinary students, Carlos Perches Treviño and Ramón Sardina García, broke into the National Museum of Anthropology (MNA) in Mexico City and stole 124 priceless pre-Columbian Mexican artifacts. The theft has been called “the robbery of the century” in Mexico and was named one of the "five best museum heists in history" by Time magazine.

Perches, along with seven others, was arrested in June 1989, and 111 pieces were recovered from Perches's parents' closet, where they had been hidden since the robbery. Ramón Sardina García was never found and has remained a fugitive.

== Heist ==
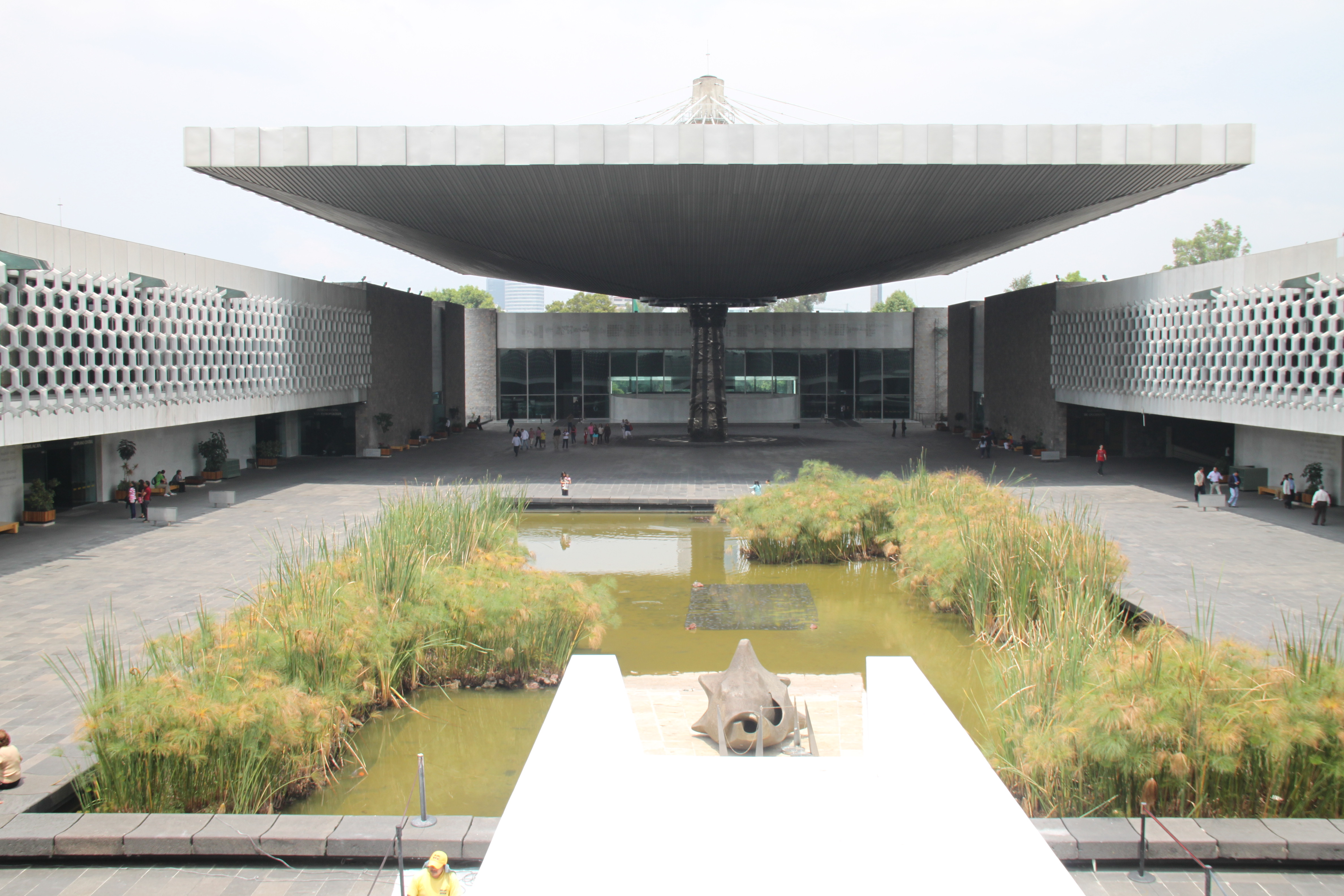
Central courtyard of the National Museum of Anthropology in 2012

Perches and Sardina were both under thirty years old at the time of the robbery and enrolled as veterinary students at the National Autonomous University of Mexico (UNAM). They were from upper-middle-class families and living in Jardines de San Mateo and Ciudad Satélite in Naucalpan, northwest of Mexico City.

They visited the museum about fifty times during the six months prior to the theft. During these visits, they studied the museum layout, learned the surveillance patterns, took photos, made sketches, and learned the value of certain pieces. Perches and Sardina originally planned the heist for New Year's Day, but changed their plans when they learned the museum planned to repair the museum's air conditioning system.

On the night of Christmas Eve, December 24, 1985, Perches and Sardina spent the holiday with their families before putting on black clothing and leaving to meet up. They arrived at the museum in Perches's Volkswagen sedan, sometime around 1 a.m., jumped over the fence that borders Paseo de la Reforma, and entered through an air conditioning duct into the museum. Sources vary on the exact time the pair spent inside the museum. The BBC stated that, according to a report from the Attorney General's office, the robbery started at 1 a.m. and lasted three hours, while The Washington Post, in an article from 1989, stated that the robbery started after 2 a.m. and took thirty minutes. While inside, the two men opened seven glass display cases in three exhibition halls. The National Museum of Anthropology initially reported the theft of 140 pieces, but later revised the total to 124 stolen objects. (The discrepancy was a result of the lack of a precise inventory at the time of the theft.) The stolen artifacts included 94 gold objects and others made of jade, turquoise, green stone, shell, and obsidian. They included objects from the sacred cenote of Chichén Itzá, more than 60 Mayan pieces from the Temple of Palenque, gold jewelry from the Mixteca room and the famous mask of the Zapotec Bat God, among others. According to Felipe Solís, a curator of the National Institute of Anthropology and History (INAH), the black-market value of just one of these pieces (the Aztec obsidian vessel in the form of a monkey) was 10 billion pesos (or $27 million USD) at the time of the robbery.

The security personnel were supposed be patrolling the 161,000 square feet of the 26 rooms every two hours, but failed to do their job because they were all in one location of the museum, celebrating Christmas. Cookies and glasses with liquor residue were later found in the museum. Perches and Sardina escaped from the museum in the Volkswagen with the artifacts, keeping them in Perches's house in Jardines de San Mateo, Naucalpan. The theft was discovered during the changing of the guards at 8 a.m. on December 25.

== Aftermath ==
An investigation started with the cooperation of the immigration department, personnel from the General Directorate of Customs, workers from the country's airports, Interpol, and more than thirty people who were tasked with solving the case. Mexican prosecutors also detained and interrogated the nine police guards assigned to the museum on the night of the theft. Additionally, the Association of Friends of the National Museum of Anthropology raised 50 million pesos to be given as a reward to anyone who could provide information that would lead to the recovery of the pieces. (The reward was never distributed.)

Perches kept the artifacts in his parents house while authorities were on the hunt. He later moved to Acapulco where he befriended local drug dealers, one of whom was named Salvador Gutiérrez, also known as "El Cabo" (the corporal). At some point Perches tried to sell the artifacts to Gutiérrez, and when Gutiérrez was arrested by narcotics officers on unrelated charges in January 1989, he confessed his knowledge of the stolen pieces and provided information about Carlos Perches in an attempt to reduce his sentence.

With this information, deputy prosecutor Javier Coello Trejo placed wiretaps in prisons and tracked all calls between Gutiérrez and Perches, which ultimately led to the capture of Perches in early June 1989. Coello said police observed Perches for forty-five days before arresting him. Seven others were also arrested in conjunction with the crime, including the brother of Perches, Luis Perches, Perches's alleged lover Isabel Camila Maciero (an Acapulco nightclub star also known as "Princesa Yamal"), Gari Nathan Clevenger, Juan Castillo Carriles, Hugo Ricardo Pérez Radilla, and Cristina Gloria González.

In Perches's parents' home, they recovered 111 of the 124 stolen pieces, wrapped in toilet paper and stored in a duffel bag. Of the remaining pieces, seven remained in the possession of Ramón Sardina, who was never found and remains a fugitive. Two other artifacts were exchanged by Perches for cocaine, and the remaining four were never located. Among those recovered were the most valuable pieces, including the mask of the Zapotec Bat God and the obsidian jar shaped like a monkey. Most of the pieces were in good condition but some restoration was required.

Perches was identified as the main author of the crime, but no real motive was ever discovered. He was described as someone who loved archeology. He spent more than a decade in prison and was murdered after his release.

When the pieces were returned to the museum, Mexican President Carlos Salinas de Gortari held an event to honor their return attended by politicians and distinguished cultural figures, including the writer Gabriel García Márquez, who stated that he felt so intrigued by the whole case that he would write a novel about it.

The theft led to the revelation of the lack of sufficient security in Mexican museums. A year after the event, then-President Miguel de la Madrid announced in his second government report that 700 million pesos would be allocated to the security of museums that depended on the INAH.

== Depictions ==
A fictionalized depiction of the incident is the subject of the 2018 film Museo.

== Gallery of selected stolen items ==
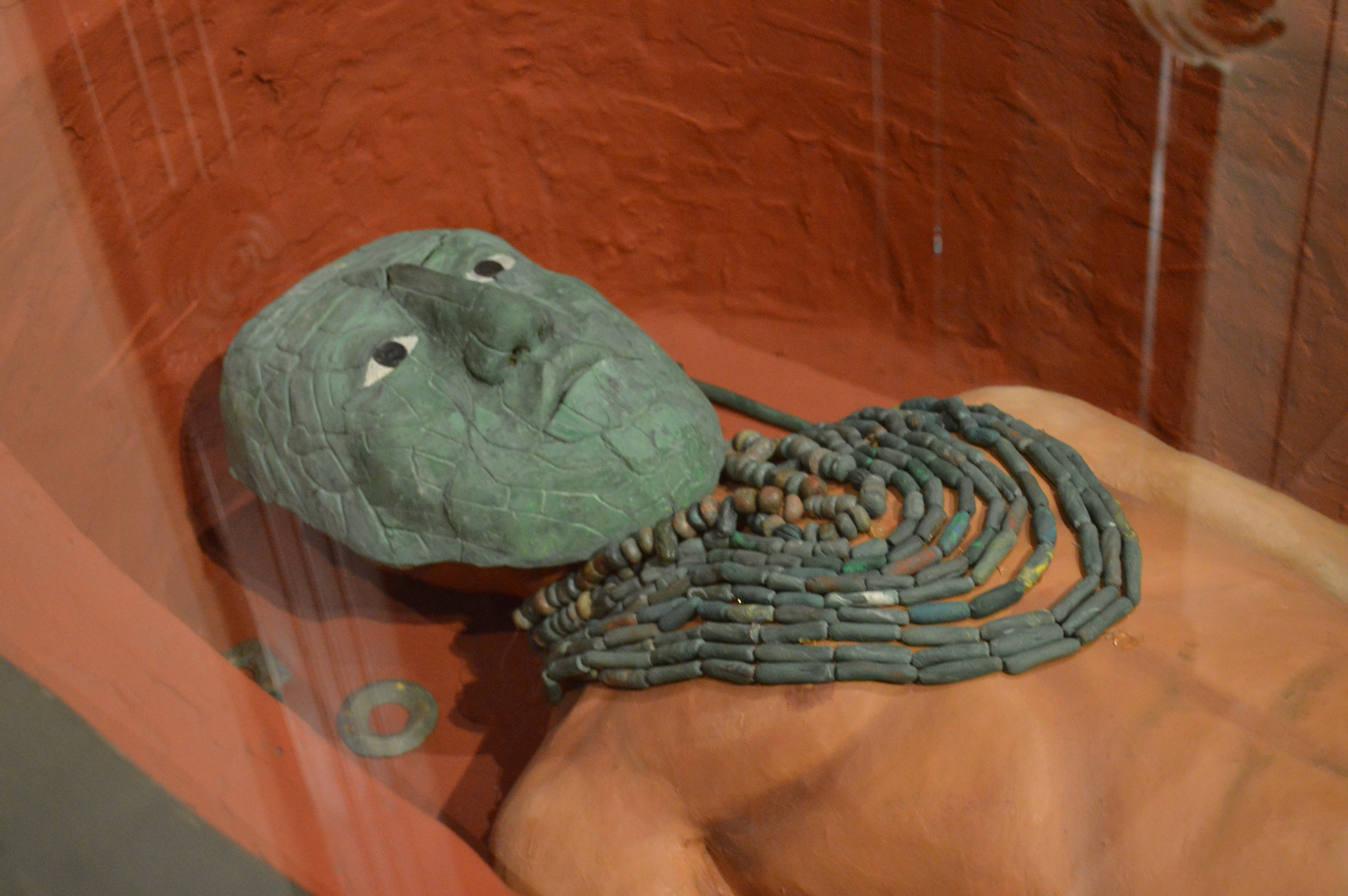
Funerary mask of Pakal

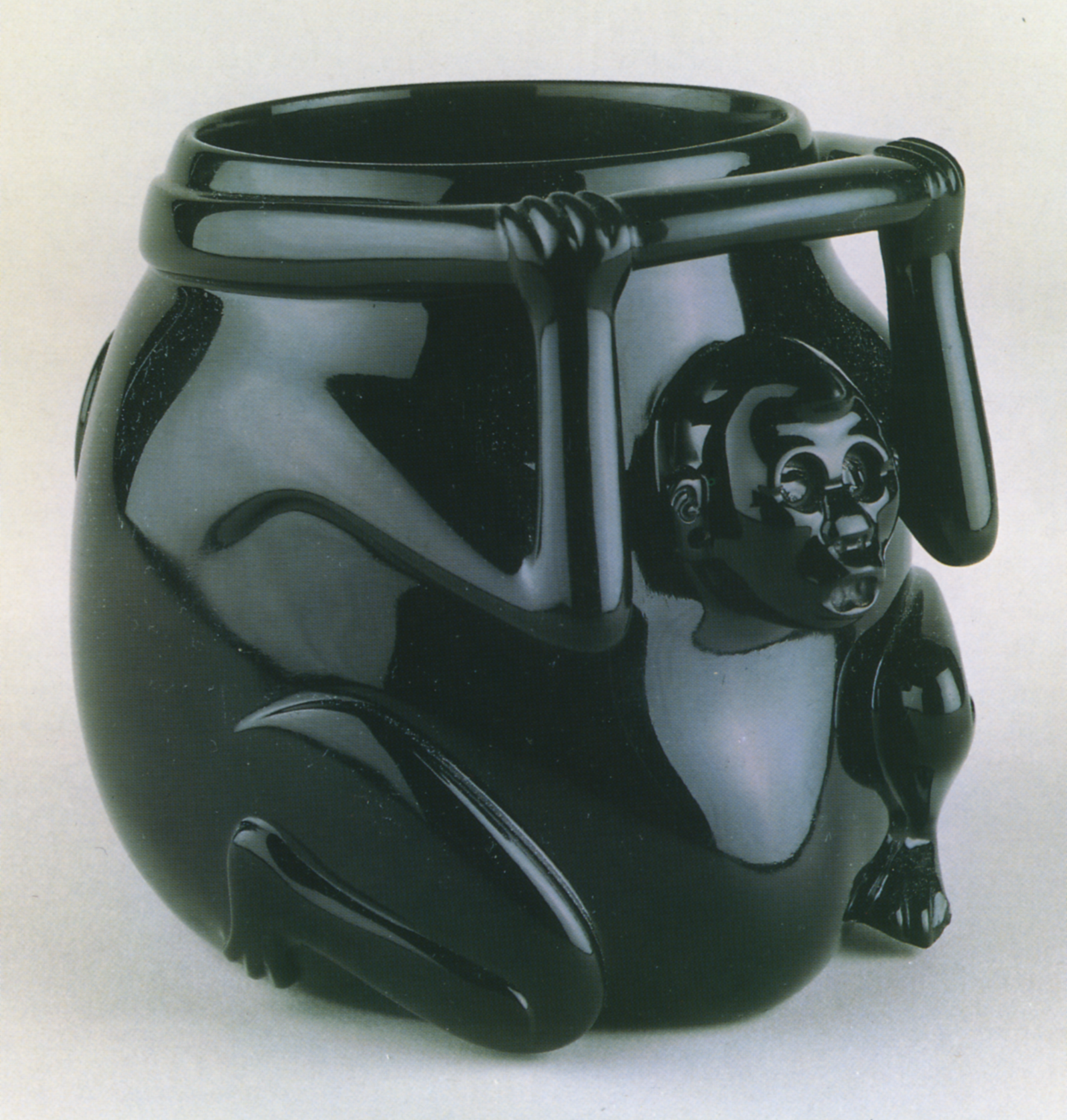
Monkey-shaped obsidian jar

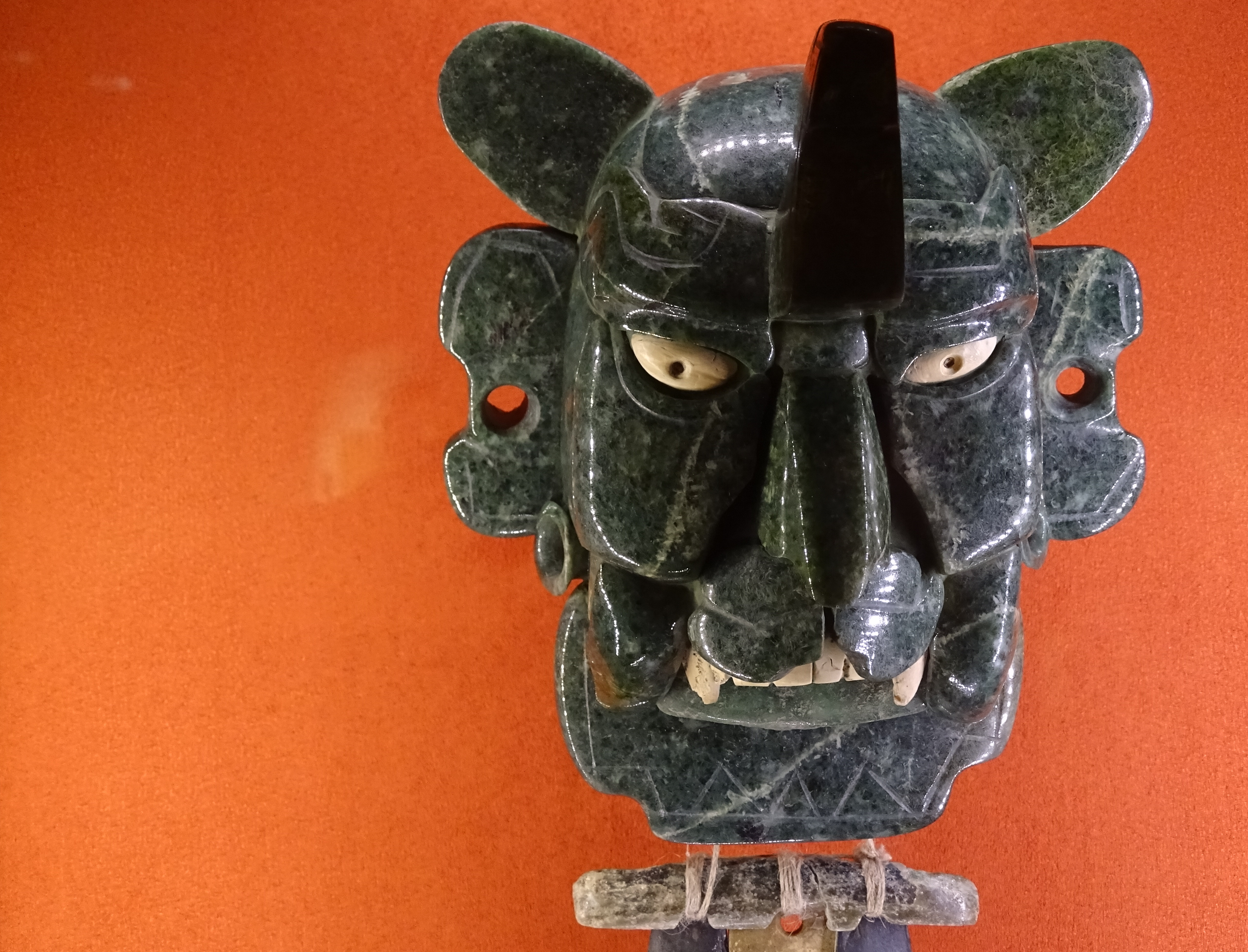
Mask of the Zapotec Bat God

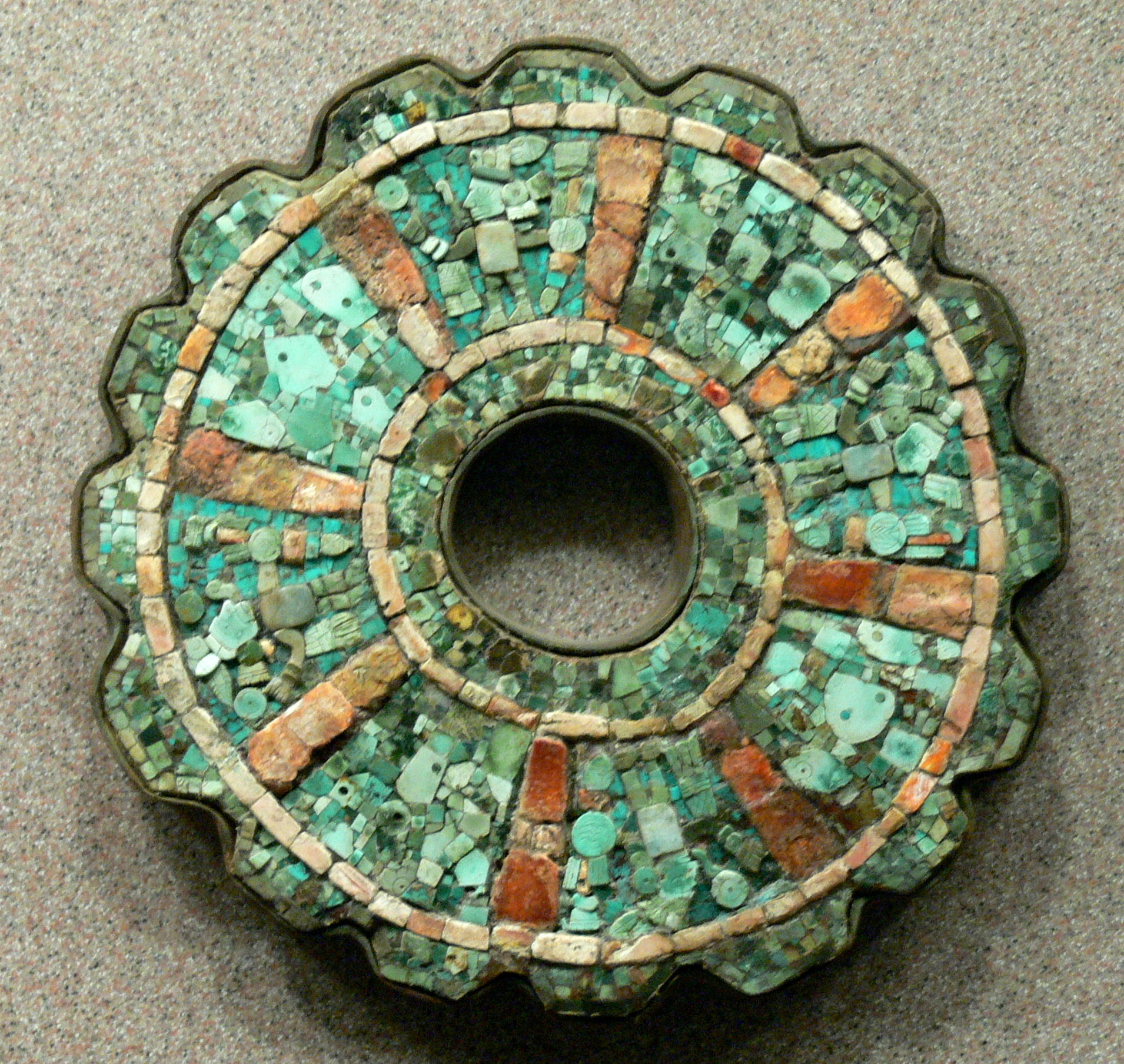
Gold and turquoise disc from Tomb 7 at Monte Albán
