= Manolo Escobar =

Spanish singer (1931–2013)

The Most Excellent Manolo Escobar
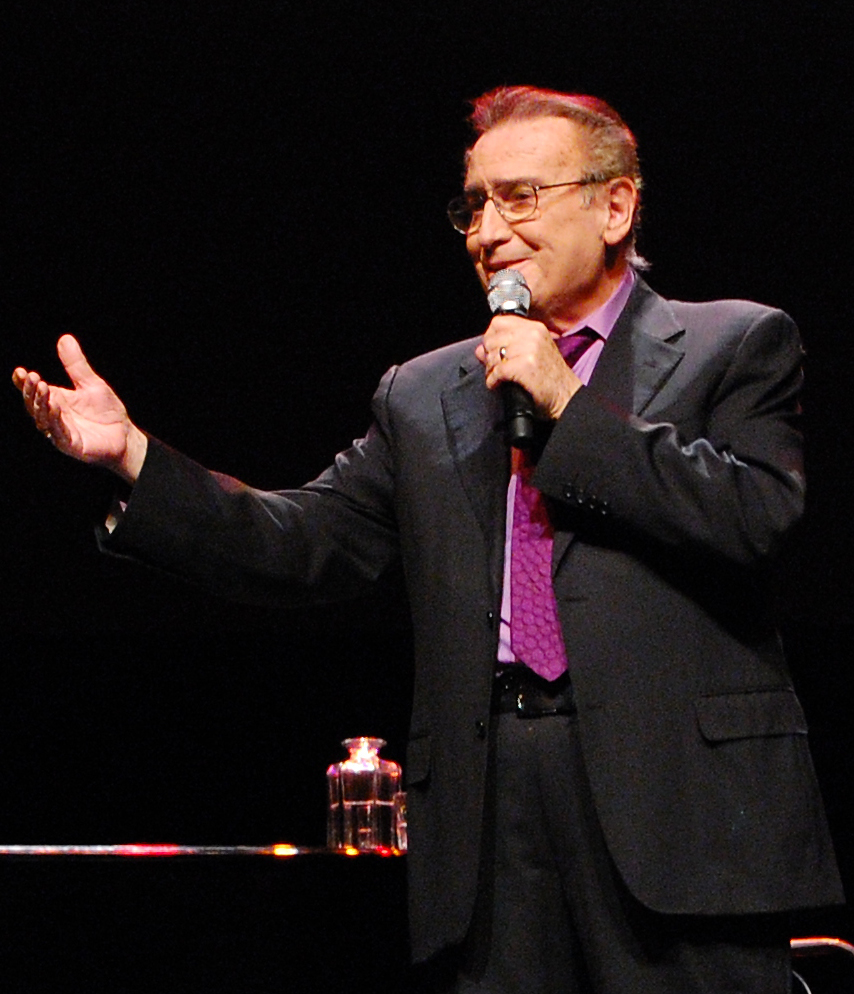
- Manolo Escobar in 2010
- Born: Manuel García Escobar; 19 October 1931; El Ejido, Almería, Spain
- Died: 24 October 2013 (aged 82); Benidorm, Alicante, Spain
- Occupations: Singer, actor, presenter
- Years active: 1956–2013
- Musical career
- Genres: Copla, rumba, pasodoble, bolero, tango, vals
- Instrument: Vocals
- Labels: Orpheo, Saef, Belter, BMG, Horus, Vamm
- Website: www.ManoloEscobar.net

Manuel García Escobar (19 October 1931 – 24 October 2013), better known as Manolo Escobar, was a Spanish singer of Andalusian copla and other Spanish music. He was also an actor and performed in multiple musicals. His popular songs include "El Porompompero" (1962), "Mi carro" (1969), "La minifalda", and "Y viva España".

== Biography ==
Manuel García Escobar was born to Antonio García and María del Carmen Escobar on 19 October 1931, the fifth of ten children. Early in Escobar's life, his father left the family tradition of farming to devote himself to hospitality and culture. Antonio then met a retired teacher who had lost his family in the Spanish Civil War. Antonio gave the teacher room and board in exchange for teaching all of his children music. Escobar started playing the flute and the piano in his early years.

When he was 14, he moved from Almería to Barcelona with his brothers, working as an apprentice in various trades. He began his career in show business between Badalona and Barcelona's red-light district (currently known as El Raval), with the group Manolo Escobar y sus guitarras (Manolo Escobar and his guitars). His brothers Salvador and Baldomero were also in the group. Later, when the group started to become successful, Juan Gabriel, another brother, joined. Juan Gabriel and sister, Maria José, would later write songs for the group.

In 1962, he rose to fame with Canciones del Maestro Solano, his debut in Madrid and Barcelona, and the premiere of the movie filmed in the town of Arcos de la Frontera (Cádiz): Los Guerrilleros.

Even after 1965, when the copla genre's popularity was in decline, Escobar topped record sales lists, and was one of the few artists who had his own company and show.

In the early 1990s, he moved into his "Porompompero" chalet in Benidorm, named after his acclaimed song. He appeared in more than 20 films and recorded almost 80 albums, 24 of which are gold records He also had a platinum selling cassette. His best-selling album was Y viva España, which sold 6 million (10 million in subsequent official reprints) copies. It was the best-selling album in Spain from 1973 to 1992.

== Personal life ==
In 1959, three months after meeting German-born Anita Marx, Escobar married her. They were married in Cologne, Germany, without knowing how to speak each other's language and remained married for 53 years until his death. In 1978, they adopted a daughter and named her Vanessa. She was only 3 days old at the time. The song "Mi pequeña flor" (My little flower) is dedicated to her.

== Death ==
Manuel García Escobar died of colon cancer on 24 October 2013, at the age of 82.

== Discography ==
- Espigas y Amapolas (1964)
- El ángel de la guarda (1966)
- Éxitos de películas (1967)
- Aquel hijo (1967)
- Películas de Manolo Escobar (1968)
- Mi novia (1968)
- Villancicos (1969)
- Manolo Escobar y sus películas (1970)
- Canciones de películas (1970)
- Aires navideños (1970)
- Sevillanas (1971)
- Grandes éxitos (1971)
- Brindis (1971) "incluye 'Mi carro'"
- Por los caminos de España (1972)
- Y viva España (1973)
- Cada lágrima tuya (1974)
- ¡Ay, Caridad! (1974)
- Qué guapa estás (1975)
- Niña bonita (1976)
- Selección Antológica del Cancionero Español Vol. I, II y III (1976–1977)
- Calor (1977)
- Labrador (1978)
- Mis mejores canciones (1978)
- Mi pequeña flor (1979)
- Amores (1980)
- Villancicos tradicionales (1981)
- Manolo, siempre Manolo (1981)
- Los grandes pasodobles... cantados (1982)
- Papá te quiero mucho (1982)
- Coraje (1983)
- Sevilla casi na (1984)
- Miel de Amores (1985)
- Antología (1986)
- Vive la vida (1986)
- Suspiros de España (1987)
- 30 aniversario (1988)
- Por pasodobles, por sevillanas (1989)
- Rumba pa ti (1990)
- ¡Qué bonita eres! (1991)
- Tango, tango (1992)
- El Clio en llamas (1993)
- Tiempo al tiempo (1994)
- Tiempo de Navidad (1995)
- Con mi acento (1996)
- Aromas (1997)
- Contemporáneo (1999)
- Grandes éxitos (1999)
- De puerto en puerto (2000)
- Manolo Escobar (2002)

== Filmography ==
Year	Title	Role	Other notes
1963	Los Guerrilleros		
1965	Mi canción es para ti	Manolo de Lorca/Curro Lucena	
1966	El padre Manolo	Padre Manolo Ramírez	
1966	Un beso en el puerto		
1967	Pero, ¿En qué país vivimos?	Antonio Torres	
1968	Relaciones casi públicas		
1969	Juicio de faldas		
1970	En un lugar de la Manga		
1971	Me debes un muerto		
1972	Entre dos amores	Gabriel Rivera	
1973	Me has hecho perder el juicio		
1974	Cuando los niños vienen de Marsella		
1975	Eva, ¿qué hace ese hombre en tu cama?		
1976	La mujer es un buen negocio		
1977	Préstamela esta noche		
1978	Donde hay patrón...	Manolo	
1979	Alejandra mon amour	Manolo Sandoval	Known as Operación Comando in South America.
1980	¿Dónde está mi niño?	Manolo Andújar	
1982	All Is Possible in Granada	Manolo	Remake of José Luis Sáenz de Heredia's 1954 film.

== Honours ==
- Silver Medal of Merit in Labour (Spain, 30 April 1969).
- Gold Medal of Merit in Labour (Spain, 29 April 2011).
