= Claudia Gravy =

Actress

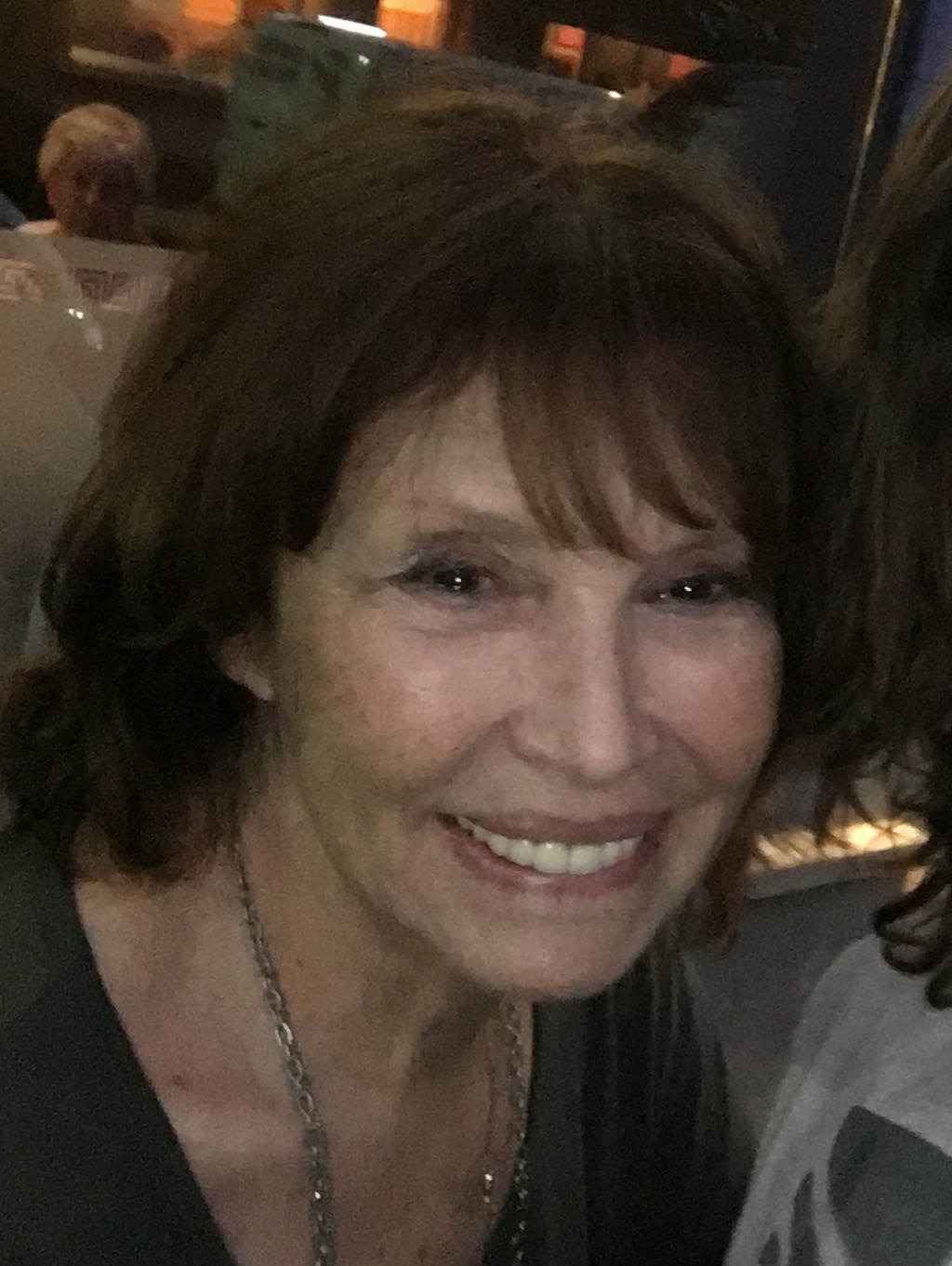
- Gravy in 2018
- Born: 12 May 1945 (age 81); Boma, Belgian Congo
- Other name: Claudia Gravi
- Occupation: Actor

Claudia Gravy (born 12 May 1945) is a Spanish nationalized actress born as Marie-Claude Perin in Boma, Democratic Republic of the Congo, when it was the Belgian Congo.

== Career ==
Claudia has lived in Madrid since 1965, when she made her debut in the cinema with Fernando Fernán Gómez's adaption of Miguel Mihura's work, Ninette y un señor de Murcia. During the following decade, she became a familiar face in Spanish cinema, with roles in dozens of films, including both strictly Spanish films and international co-productions, such as Sweetly You'll Die Through Love (La llamada del sexo, 1977) by Tulio Demicheli.

Since the 1980s, her credits have become less frequent, but she continues to appear in supporting roles, including Vicente Aranda's Libertarias (1996) and Carlos Naranja Estrella's film, Dreams in the Middle of the World (1999). In 1975, she played an Amazon in the Spanish production Kilma, Queen of the Amazons.

In more recent years, she has supplemented her appearances on the big screen with recurring television roles and performances in the theater.

== Selected filmography ==
- Marquis de Sade: Justine (1969)
- Two Undercover Angels (1969)
- The Tigers of Mompracem (1970)
- Matalo! (1970)
- Rebels of Arizona (1970)
- Bad Man's River (1971)
- Byleth: The Demon of Incest (1972)
- The Weapon, the Hour & the Motive (1972)
- The Nun and the Devil (1973)
- A forza di sberle (1974)
- Kilma, Queen of the Amazons (1976)
- La llamada del sexo (1977)
- Yellow Hair and the Fortress of Gold (1984)
- Tuareg: The Desert Warrior (1984)
