= Tívoli =

- Theatrical release poster.
- Directed by: Alberto Isaac
- Written by: Alberto Isaac; Alfonso Arau
- Produced by: Fidel Pizarro
- Starring: Alfonso Arau; Pancho Córdova; Lyn May; Carmen Salinas
- Cinematography: Jorge Stahl Jr.
- Edited by: Rafael Ceballos
- Music by: Rubén Fuentes; Eduardo Magallanes
- Production companies: Corporación Nacional Cinematográfica (CONACINE); Dasa Films
- Release date: 1974
- Running time: 127 minutes
- Country: Mexico
- Language: Spanish

Tívoli is a 1974 Mexican comedy-drama film directed by Alberto Isaac and starring Alfonso Arau, Pancho Córdova, Lyn May and Carmen Salinas. Loosely based on the true story of the last days of the Teatro Tívoli (Mexico City), an infamous variety theatre which had its heyday in the 1940s and early 1950s in Mexico City, the film, as its opening text claims, rather than give an historical account, aspires to evocate, in a nostalgic and humorous way, the atmosphere of the lively nightlife of that period, "which has disappeared forever." Interweaved with burlesque performances with colorful costumes and sets, seductive stripteases and comedic variety acts, the film's main plot tells how a plan to tear down the theater by politicians, city officials, and property developers is met with resistance by the entertainers.

== Cast ==
- Alfonso Arau as Tiliches
- Pancho Córdova as Jesús Quijano "Quijanito"
- Lyn May as Eva Candela
- Carmen Salinas as Chapas
- Mario García "Harapos" as himself
- Héctor Ortega as lawyer Félix Pantoja "Cacomixtle"
- Dorotea Guerra as Lilí
- Ernesto Gómez Cruz as engineer Reginaldo T.
- Dámaso Pérez Prado as himself
- The Dolly Sisters as themselves
- Don Facundo as himself
- José Wilhelmy "Willy" as himself
- Gina Morett as Mimí Manila
- Paco Müller as Bulmaro
- Consuelo Quezada as dwarf
- Margarito Alfaro as dwarf
- Zuzy D'Tornell as Naná
- Alfredo Soto as devil
- Germán Funes as gay man
- José Luis Aguirre "Trotsky" as Waikiki nightclub emcee
- Juan José Martínez Casado as Pueyo
- Roberto Corell as Tarragón
- Gerardo Zepeda as Criaturón
- Dai Won Moon as Chi
- Xavier Fuentes as stage director
- Mario Zebadúa "Colocho" as blind man
- Carolina Barret as Ms. Quijano
- Alberto Mariscal as city's mayor
- Paloma Zozaya as showgirl
- Armando Pascual as Lupe
- Sara Guasch as dress shop owner
- Manuel Alvarado as orchestra leader
- Federico González as traffic cop
- Juan Garza as bodyguard
- Elsa Benn
- "Chino" Ibarra as trumpeter
- Cristal
- Paco Sañudo as performer
- Regino Herrera as man in waiting room
- Nathanael León as Sobera
- Alfredo Gutiérrez as man with Reginaldo
- Claudio Isaac as TV cameraman
- León Michel as TV director
- Miguel Ángel Ferriz nieto
- Inés Murillo as doña Engracia
- Ramiro Orci as police agent
- Armando Duarte
- Miguel Inclán hijo
- Carlos Gómez
- Lupita Peruyero
- Héctor Kiev
- Margarita Narváez "Fufurufa"
- Jesús Duarte
- Rubén Calderón

== Bibliography ==
- Mora, Carl J. (University of California Press, 1982). Mexican Cinema: Reflections of a Society, 1896-2004. Third ed., 2005. McFarland & Company. ISBN 9780786420834.
