= Soltero en el aire =

Mexican telenovela

- Genre: Telenovela; Drama
- Starring: Óscar Bonfiglio; Sergio DeFassio; Pilar Delgado; Frank Moro; Grace Renat
- Country of origin: Mexico
- Original language: Spanish

Production
- Executive producer: Humberto Navárro
- Production company: Televisa

Original release
- Network: Canal de las Estrellas
- Release: 1984 – 1985

Soltero en el aire (English title:Single in the air) is a Mexican telenovela produced by Humberto Navárro for Televisa in 1984. It starred Óscar Bonfiglio, Sergio DeFassio, Pilar Delgado, Frank Moro and Grace Renat.

== Cast ==
- Óscar Bonfiglio
- Sergio DeFassio
- Pilar Delgado
- Frank Moro
- Grace Renat
