= Zona Roja =

- Directed by: Emilio Fernández
- Written by: Emilio Fernández; José Revueltas
- Produced by: Guillermo Calderón; Pedro Calderón
- Starring: Fanny Cano; Armando Silvestre; Víctor Junco; Venetia Vianello; Grace Renat
- Cinematography: Daniel López
- Edited by: Jorge Bustos
- Music by: Manuel Esperón
- Distributed by: CONACINE
- Release date: 1976
- Running time: 96 minutes
- Country: Mexico
- Language: Spanish

Zona Roja (English: Red Zone) is a 1976 Mexican film directed by Emilio Fernández and starring Fanny Cano.

== Plot ==
In a whorehouse in Acapulco, lives Leonor (Fanny Cano), a young and beautiful woman who is awaiting to reunite with an old lover. Suddenly, the man reappears to take her away from her life of vice. But the debt owed by Leonor to the "Madame" of the house causes a series of conflicts.

== Reception ==
The film shocked audiences with the explicit scenes of nudity of the actresses playing the prostitute roles.
