= Los Guerrilleros (1963 film) =

- Directed by: Pedro Luis Ramírez
- Produced by: Alfredo Fraile P.C. / Arturo González Producciones
- Music by: Juan Solano
- Release date: 1963
- Running time: 82 minutes
- Country: Spain
- Language: Spanish

Los Guerrilleros is a 1963 Spanish motion picture. The film was directed by Pedro Luis Ramírez, and stars Manolo Escobar, Rocío Jurado, Alfredo Mayo, and Gracita Morales.

== Plot ==
After the sacking of Córdoba, the troops of Napoleon's army, under the command of Colonel Tenardier, went to Andújar to join General Dupont and give the final battle to the few Spanish patriots that General Castaños has been able to gather. In 1808, in some towns of Spain, guerrilla groups formed attacking the French. In Montoro (Córdoba) they manage to annihilate, in a heroic battle, fought in the town square itself, the troops of Colonel Tenardier.

== Cast ==
- José Cuadros
- Rafael Durán
- Manolo Escobar
- Manolo Gómez Bur
- Pilar Gómez Ferrer
- Manuel Guitart
- Rocío Jurado
- Paula Martel
- Daniel Martín
- Alfredo Mayo
- Gracita Morales
