= Eva, ¿qué hace ese hombre en tu cama? =

- Directed by: Tulio Demicheli
- Written by: Julio Amussen (play); Tulio Demicheli; Alfonso Paso
- Produced by: José Díaz; Alfredo Fraile; Arturo González
- Starring: Iris Chacón; Jorge Lavat; Olga Breeskin; Manolo Escobar; Paca Gabaldón; Adalberto Rodriguez; Antonio Garisa
- Cinematography: Juan Manuel Herrera
- Edited by: José Luis Berlanga
- Music by: Juan Bracons; Manuel Cubedo
- Production companies: Arturo González Producciones Cinematográficas, S.A. Víctor Films S.A.
- Release date: 24 November 1975 (Spain)
- Running time: 90 minutes
- Countries: Mexico; Spain; Puerto Rico
- Language: Spanish

Eva, ¿qué hace ese hombre en tu cama? (Spanish: "Eva, What is That Man Doing in Your Bed?"), also known as Qué bravas son las solteras (Spanish: "How Wild Single Women Are") is a 1975 comedy film co-produced between Mexico, Spain and Puerto Rico, directed by Tulio Demicheli and starring Manolo Escobar, Paca Gabaldón, Iris Chacón, Olga Breeskin, Jorge Lavat and Antonio Garisa.

== Plot ==
Manolo (Manolo Escobar), a singer, falls in love with a young woman whose photo appears on a calendar, and suffers from constant hallucinations that make hm see the young woman everywhere. At the same time, he argues with his neighbor who lives upstairs in his apartment every time Manolo tries to play the piano while writing music, because it bothers her a lot. Manolo eventually travels to Puerto Rico, upon learning that the model plans to run an advertising campaign there, only to discover that the woman, Eva (Paca Gabaldón), was also the neighbor with whom he was always arguing. From there, Manolo and Eva must go through several adventures that include Salomé (Olga Breeskin), the mentally unbalanced ex-girlfriend of Manolo who chases him with a gun; César (Jorge Lavat), Eva's boyfriend; Clotilde (Iris Chacón), an extroverted young woman friend of Eva's who crosses paths with Manolo; and Clotilde's wealthy father, Crisanto (Antonio Garisa).

== Cast ==
- Manolo Escobar as Manolo Durán
- Paca Gabaldón as Eva (credited as Mary Francis)
- Jorge Lavat as César
- Olga Breeskin as Salomé
- Iris Chacón as Clotilde
- Antonio Garisa as Crisanto (credited as Antonio Gariza)
- Adalberto Rodríguez
- Luis Sánchez Polack as Disturbed doctor (credited as L. Sánchez Polack)

== Box office ==
The film ranked 19th out of the 25 highest grossing Spanish films from 1970 to 1975.

== Bibliography ==
- Payá Beltrán, José. Alfonso Paso, autor. Universidad de Alicante, 2018.
- García, Kino. Historia del Cine Puertorriqueño. Palibrio, 2014.
- García, Kino. Cine puertorriqueño: filmografía, fuentes y referencias. Editorial LEA, 1997.
- Trelles Plazaola, Luis. South American Cinema: Dictionary of Film Makers. La Editorial, UPR, 1989.
- Martialay, Félix. El cine español durante el franquismo. El sastre de los libros, 2017.
