= El Porompompero =

Song by Manolo Escobar
- Language: Spanish
- Released: 1960
- Genre: Rumba
- Label: Saef
- Composer: Juan Solano Pedrero
- Lyricists: José Antonio Ochaíta; Xandro Valerio

"El Porompompero" is a rumba written in 1960 by musician Juan Solano Pedrero and lyricists José Antonio Ochaíta and Xandro Valerio. It was written for singer El Príncipe Gitano, but was not recorded at the time, and was recorded a year later. Then it was Manolo Escobar who first recorded and popularized it, with which it was his first success as a singer. In 1962, it was part of the musical repertoire, but with a different version of the text, adapted for the film Los Guerrilleros directed by Pedro Luis Ramirez with El Escobar himself in the main role. In 1970, "El Porompompero" performed by Manolo Escobar became the best-selling single in Spain, selling over a million copies. In 1982, it was also part of the musical repertoire of the film Everything is Possible in Granada directed by Rafael Romero Marchent and starring Manolo Escobar.

Many singers have made several versions in different languages. Among them are Sara Montiel, Marisol, Mina, Enrico Macias in France or Amália Rodrigues in Portugal.
