= Elias Breeskin =

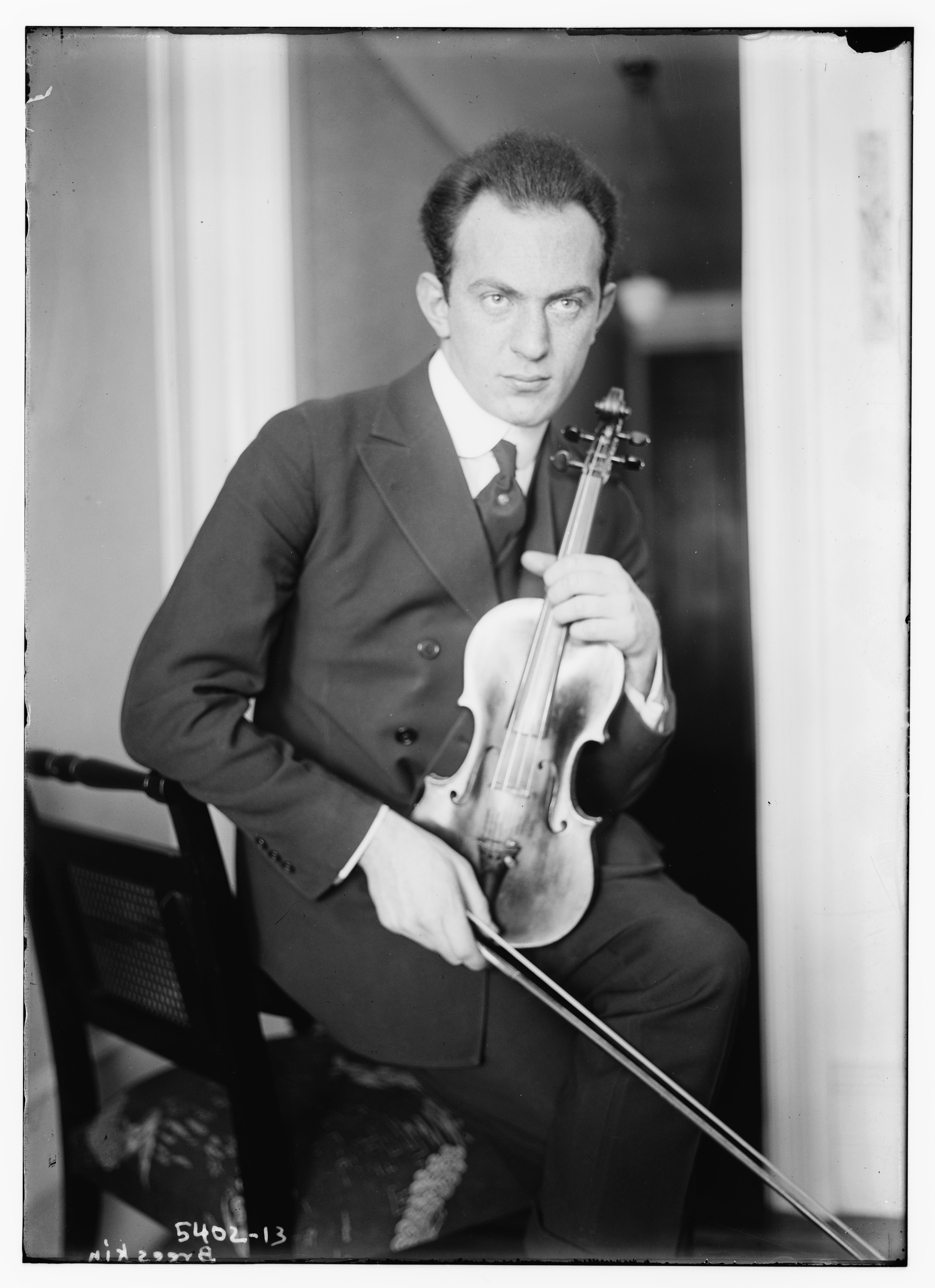

Background information
- Born: October 25, 1895; Yekaterinoslav, Russian Empire (now Ukraine)
- Died: May 9, 1969 (aged 73) Mexico city
- Occupations: Violinist, composer, conductor
- Instrument: Violin

Elias Breeskin (Russian: Элиас Брискин; Ukrainian: Еліас Бреескін; October 25, 1895 – May 9, 1969) was a Dnipro-born violinist, composer and conductor

== First years ==
Elias was born on October 25, 1895, in Yekaterinoslav (now Dnipro), a city in the Yekaterinoslav Governorate of the Russian Empire, now part of Ukraine. His family came from a well-to-do Ukrainian-Jewish family with some Russian-Jewish roots. Breeskin kept memoir of his hometown, as shown on the film Doctor Zhivago in which shows a dam on the Dnieper River. Elias was the youngest of three brothers. His older twin brothers were about ten years older than he, and were identified as potential classical musicians. The story has it that Boris and Daniel, at the age of 19, went off to the Caucasus Mountains to play a violin gig. Boris ran outside in the frigid air without his overcoat, caught pneumonia, and died. Elias was profoundly affected by the death of his brother. Olga, Elias' mother, realized that he had musical talent as well, and bent her strong will to providing him with the best musical education that could be obtained in Russia at the time.

Elias’ references to his mother were always curious in nature. He referred to her with a mixture of emotions, among them being strong love, fear, admiration, and wonder, all present in his face. Elias' father was a quiet, dear man who had learned, appropriately, not to cross his indomitable wife, who was approximately 200 pounds in weight, and quite muscular.

== First successes ==
In 1903, shortly after Elias’ seventh birthday, his mother turned him over to a professional violinist in the local Conservatory in Cracow, Poland, for lessons. At the age of 8, he played Bach's E major concerto, and was a sensation. During the next two years, he toured through Ukraine and western Russia, where he was also tutored by Leopold Auer, personal musician to the Czar. Young Elias was met with overwhelming responses to his violin playing. He was hailed as one of the greatest child prodigies ever.

The family left Russia because of the Jewish massacre. They came to America and settled in Washington, DC where they already had relatives established. Before he left Russia, Elias in 1906 played for Franz Joseph, Emperor of Austria-Hungary, with tremendous success. Family lore has it that the emperor gave him an enormous ring, with three rubies, directly from his finger.

== In the United States ==
Raff's cavatina (3:09)
This cavatina for violin and piano (Op. 85) was composed by Joachim Raff and performed in 1920, violin solo by Elias Breeskin, pianoforte by Rudolph Gruen (1900-1966)

When the family arrived in America, Olga sought funding for her son’s musical career. She ensconced herself in front of The White House, and asked to see Edith Roosevelt. The guards ignored her. She returned to the front gate day after day, until Mrs. Roosevelt asked for information about “the babushka lady.” Olga told the First Lady about Elias, and asked if she and her friends could sponsor his musical education. After hearing him play, Mrs. Roosevelt agreed to do so, and got together a group of people, including Mr. Frank Damrosch, who sponsored Elias’ education at the Juilliard School of Music, at that time called the Institute of Musical Arts.

In the early part of the century, the best violin instructor in America was Franz Kneisel. Maestro Kneisel took on Elias as a pupil, and had enormous influence on his subsequent career. After nine years at Juilliard, Elias won the Loeb prize in 1915. A part of this prize was a concert at Carnegie Hall, which was extremely well received; the reviewers in the next day’s newspapers remarked on the warmth and purity of his tone, his technical abilities, and the sincerity and refinement of his playing.

A wealthy patron, Edward Schafer, a member of the New York Stock Exchange, gave Elias a Rougemont Stradivarius with a Tourte bow as a gift. Schafer had originally purchased the violin from the Rudolph Wurlitzer Company, of 113 West Fortieth Street, for $16,000 together with the bow for $850. Elias and the violin were inseparable for the next ten years. When the stock market crashed in 1929, Elias returned the violin to his benefactor to help him pay his debts.

In 1917, Elias became a member of the New York Symphony under Walter Damrosch. Others in the orchestra included future superstars Mischa Elman, Pablo Casals, and Joseph Hoffman. Elias received great reviews for his performance at the Aeolian Hall in February 1918. Elias won a place as Enrico Caruso’s accompanist for his tour in 1918. That year he made recordings for Brunswick Records, the first of which appeared on a rare vertically cut issue in Canada. He returned to Carnegie Hall again in April 1919 and was noted for his vigorous style.

== First health problems ==
In 1919, Elias met Adelyn Dohme, the daughter of one of the wealthiest men in the country, the owner of the Dohme Chemical Company, which became Sharp and Dohme Pharmaceuticals, and in 1953 Merck Sharp & Dohme. Adelyn’s family was very much opposed to their marriage, which took place in June 1920. Together they parented three daughters, Jean Dorothy.and Gloria

Around the time of this marriage, Elias became pathologically addicted to gambling. This malady was to plague him with horrendous consequences for both him and his family for the rest of his life.

== As a conductor ==
Elias and Adelyn settled down, and he became concertmaster of the Capitol Theatre Orchestra in New York. In 1925, he became the conductor of the Minneapolis Symphony Orchestra. Due to gambling debts, he had to leave Minneapolis, and ended up reestablishing the Pittsburgh Symphony Orchestra in 1927. After two years there, Elias continued to run up enormous gambling debts, and Adelyn’s father was successful in getting his daughter to agree to end the marriage, effectively ending Elias' career in Pittsburgh as well. Adelyn would later become Director of the Baltimore Museum of Art.

== As a composer ==
When Elias returned in disgrace to New York, he composed Cosmopolis, a descriptive piece which somewhat resembles Ottorino Respighi’s The Fountains of Rome. At this time, Elias found himself in the intensive care unit of a hospital, having suffered a ruptured appendix. Peritonitis had set in, and he was not expected to live. After considerable medical intervention, his life was saved, and he was due to be discharged from the hospital. He said goodbye to everyone, including Anna, the nurses’ orderly on the ward; he asked her in his typically dramatic way, “How can I possibly thank you for giving me back my life?” Anna looked him straight in the eye, and said, “You can marry me.” When Elias told his son John this story, the night before John's marriage, he reached his hand across the table in the bar on Broadway, tousled John's hair, and said, “It's a good thing too, because you were three months along the way.” Anna gave birth to Elias' two sons, John first and Eugene (Gene) two years later.

== The Hollywood Bowl Symphony Orchestra ==
Elias was the arranger and one of the performers for the Eddie Cantor show; when it moved to Hollywood, Anna, Gene and John moved there with Elias. They arrived in Hollywood in 1937, and moved into a wonderful neighborhood where Bob Hope lived down the street. During this time, there were so many musicians who were out of work that Elias formed what later became the Hollywood Bowl Symphony Orchestra, and began to write music for movies. It was also at this time that he embezzled the entire payroll of the orchestra, and left for Mexico City, on the run, because Mexico did not yet have an extradition treaty with the US. The musicians of the orchestra, knowing that Elias had ripped them off, still prepared a scroll for him, testifying to his musicianship, and for giving them a step forward in their careers. Elias kept that scroll on the wall for many years.

== In Mexico ==
In the 1940s he moved to Mexico and became an exclusive artist of the XEB Radio station in Mexico City, the oldest in the country composed scores for the Cinema of Mexico including the Cantinflas film Neither blood nor sand. He had a son Elias Jnr and a daughter who became a famous entertainer and violinist herself, Olga Breeskin.

In 1941, Anna, Gene, and John Breeskin joined Elias in Mexico City, where he had become musical director for XEW, the most important radio station in the country. John Breeskin describes one Christmas sitting in box seat in the principal orchestra hall in Mexico City near the President of Mexico, and watching his father Elias take the stage, lift his baton, and give the downbeat for Tchaikovsky’s The Nutcracker. John Breeskin also describes living in a mansion with several servants, including a chauffeur, a gardener, a bodyguard, a cook and two young maids. Elias would come home from work, take off his suit jacket, and reveal a tiny Capuchin monkey tucked into his armpit. He would come home from the mercado with a parrot with violently colored feathers perched on his shoulder; this was typical.

== In prison ==
In May 1945, Elias was arrested and taken to jail as a political prisoner due to his gambling debts and for being on the wrong side of the political process; he was sent to "las Islas Marías" (the equivalent of Devil’s Island), where his cellmate was Ramón Mercader, Leon Trotsky’s assassin. He was held there for almost a year.

During this time his marriage ended. After Elias got out of jail, he married his third wife Lena Torres, with whom he had a daughter Olga and son Elias Junior, also an accomplished violinist. While in prison, before he was pardoned by the president of Mexico, Manuel Ávila Camacho (1 December 1940 – 30 November 1946) Elias wrote La Ciudad de Los Muertos based upon his experiences in prison. This was very favorably received when he performed it at The Palacio de las Bellas Artes in Mexico City.

== His death ==
Elias, who never bothered to look about him when he was crossing the street, was hit by a car and broke his hip. The hip was replaced, but he broke it again. He died in his sleep of pneumonia on Friday May 9, 1969, at the age of 73.
