= Andrés García =

Mexican actor (1941–2023)

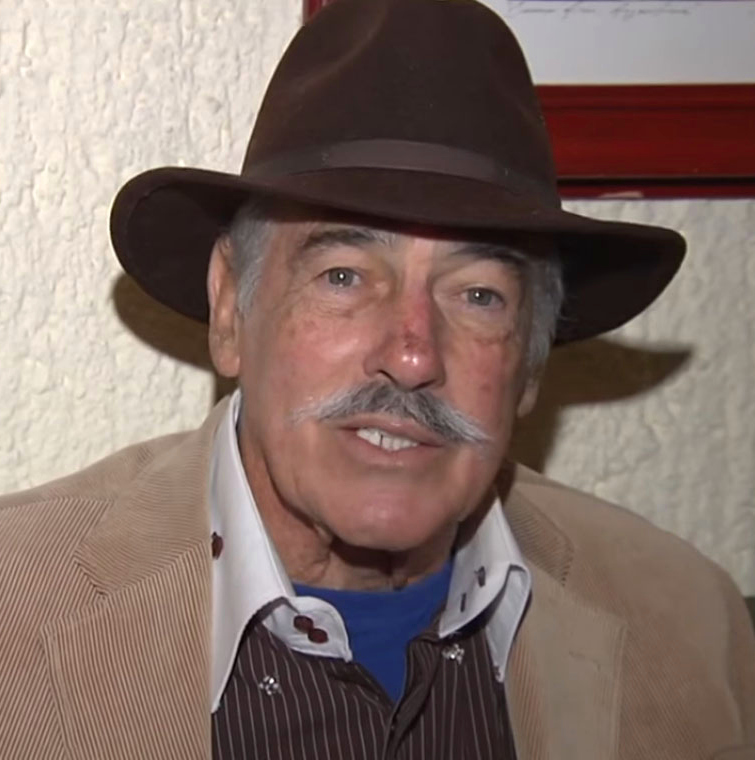
- García in 2018
- Born: 24 May 1941; Santo Domingo, Dominican Republic
- Died: 4 April 2023 (aged 81); Acapulco, Guerrero, Mexico
- Occupation: Actor
- Years active: 1963–2023

Andrés García García (24 May 1941 – 4 April 2023) was a Dominican-born actor. He emerged as a leading man in action and adventure films during the late 1960s and early 1970s, later becoming a popular star of telenovelas. He was nominated for an Ariel Award for Best Supporting Actor for his performance in the film El principio (1973), and won a Premios TVyNovelas for Best Actor for El Privilegio de Amar (1999).

== Early life ==
García was born in Santo Domingo in 1941, the son of Spanish Republican exiles Andrés García La Calle and Francisca García Acevedo. His Basque father was a flying ace and squadron leader in the Republican Air Force during the Civil War. During the 1950s, García's parents became disillusioned with the authoritarian regime of Rafael Leónidas Trujllo and emigrated to Mexico. García spent his youth in Acapulco, where he worked as a boatman and scuba diving instructor.

== Career ==
Beginning in the late 1960s, García became a male sex symbol in Mexico and the rest of Latin America, participating in movies, telenovelas and photo-romance novels (magazine featuring photos of actors who create a story—a popular phenomenon across Latin America during the 1970s).

In 1985 García starred in Mexican telenovela Tú o nadie, with Lucía Mendez and Salvador Pineda. Tú o nadie became a major hit and led to García receiving many international offers. He accepted an offer to go to Puerto Rico in 1986, where he acted in the soap operas Amame, with Johanna Rosaly, and Escándalo, with Iris Chacón and Charytín. Escándalo flopped, and the number of episodes recorded for that soap opera was cut in half by the television channel.

In 2005, García participated in a reality show titled El Principe Azul (meaning Prince Charming, though it literally means The Blue Prince), a show geared toward finding his son, Leonardo a girlfriend. García began to flirt with the young women on the show, going as far as having an on-camera kiss with one of the contestants, making his son grow frustrated, and eventually leave the show. Two previously unknown men were then cast to participate in the show and try to conquer one of the ladies involved in it. In 2006, he starred in the soap opera El Cuerpo del Deseo, broadcast by Telemundo International. The script of this telenovela is about transmigration, the passing of a soul into another body after death, coinciding with García's beliefs on this subject.

== Personal life ==
Andres Garcia married Sonia Infante in 1980 and divorced in 1992. He also married Sandra Vale.

García was also involved romantically, and remained friends, with Mexican model Carmen Campuzano and Puerto Rican singer Zeny, from the pop vocal duet Zeny & Zory.

=== Death ===
García died on 4 April 2023 in Acapulco, Mexico from complications of cirrhosis at the age of 81.

== Filmography ==
- 2007: El Pantera .... Rubio Barrios (2007–2008)
- 2002: Hospital Central (2002–2007)
- 2005: El cuerpo del deseo .... Pedro Jose Donoso
- 2005: La última noche .... Fabián
- 2004: El Cristo de plata
- 2002: King of Texas .... Davis
- 2002: Detras del paraíso
- 1999-2000: Mujeres engañadas .... Javier Duarte (1999–2000)
- 1999: Puppet .... Gandolier
- 1998-1999: El Privilegio De Amar .... Andrés Duval (husband of Luciana and father of Victor Manuel) (1998–1999)
- 1997: Noi siamo angeli ... a.k.a. "We Are Angels"
- 1996: Los matones de mi pueblo
- 1996: Con toda el alma .... Daniel Linares
- 1995: Morir mil muertes
- 1995: El tigre Murrieta
- 1994: El justiciero
- 1994: El jinete de acero .... Pedro Grande
- 1992: Perros de presa ... a.k.a. Los fugitivos (Mexico)
- 1991: La mujer prohibida .... Hernán Gallardo
- 1990: Sueño y despertar de Aurelio Marítimo
- 1990: El magnate .... Gonzalo
- 1990: El día de los Albañiles IV
- 1990: Herencia maldita
- 1989: Programado para morir
- 1989: Entre compadres te veas
- 1989: Que viva el merengue y la lambada
- 1989: Deuda saldada
- 1989: Buscando la muerte
- 1988: Solicito marido para engañar .... Fabián Conde Mariscal
- 1988: Mi fantasma y yo
- 1988: Los plomeros y las ficheras
- 1988: Mi nombre es coraje .... Juan
- 1987: El niño y el Papa .... Carlos
- 1987: Asesino nocturno
- 1986: Los Amantes del Señor de la Noche .... Amante de Amparo
- 1986: El hijo de Pedro Navaja .... Pedro Navaja
- 1986: Río de oro .... Rodolfo
- 1986: El cafre
- 1986: Herencia maldita
- 1985: Sangre en el Caribe
- 1985: Toña machetes
- 1985: La risa alarga la vida y algo mas
- 1985: Tú o nadie .... Antonio Lombardo
- 1984: Pedro Navaja .... Pedro Navaja
- 1983: Dos de abajo
- 1983: Las modelos de desnudos
- 1983: Chile picante .... (segment "La Infidelidad") ... a.k.a. "Sexo a la Mexicana"
- 1983: El día del compadre .... Pepe
- 1983: Sexo vs. sexo
- 1983: La venganza de Maria
- 1983: Se me sale cuando me río
- 1983: El Cazador de demonios .... Melquiades Franco
- 1983: Inseminación artificial
- 1982: Una gallina muy ponedora ... a.k.a. Amor a navaja libre
- 1982: La leyenda del tambor ... a.k.a. El niño del tambor (Mexico) ... a.k.a. Timbaler del Bruc (Mexico)
- 1981: D.F./Distrito Federal
- 1981: Mi nombre es Sergio, soy alcoholico
- 1981: Las mujeres de Jeremías .... Pancho
- 1981: El sexo sentido
- 1981: El macho bionico
- 1980: Las cabareteras
- 1980: Mírame con ojos pornográficos .... Jose de Lugo ... a.k.a. "El sexologo"
- 1980: Las tentadoras
- 1980: Carnada ... a.k.a. "La pasión del fenix"
- 1980: El siete vidas
- 1980: Dos hermanos murieron
- 1980: Amigo
- 1980: Y ahora, que?
- 1980: El jinete de la muerte
- 1979: Muñecas de medianoche
- 1979: Nora la rebelde
- 1979: Day of the Assassin .... Beltron
- 1979: Encuentro en el abiso .... Scott
- 1979: El giro, el pinto, y el Colorado
- 1979: Carlos el terrorista .... Carlos
- 1978: Cyclone .... Andrés
- 1978: Bermude: la fossa maledetta .... Andres Montoya
- 1978: El cuatro dedos
- 1978: The Bermuda Triangle .... Alan
- 1978: Cuchillo .... Cuchillo
- 1978: Suave, cariño, muy suave
- 1978: Manaos .... Carmelo Sierra ... a.k.a. Rebelión en la selva (Mexico)
- 1977: La llamada del sexo ... a.k.a. Dulcemente morirás por amor (Mexico)
- 1977: ¡Tintorera! .... Miguel
- 1976: El trinquetero
- 1975: Aventuras de un caballo blanco y un niño
- 1975: Paloma .... Daniel
- 1974: La amargura de mi raza
- 1974: La corona de un campeon
- 1973: Morirás con el sol (Motociclistas suicidas) .... Carlos Rodríguez
- 1973: El principio
- 1973: Besos, besos... y mas besos
- 1973: Ana del aire .... Jorge
- 1973: Adios, New York, adios
- 1972: Nadie te querrá como yo .... Javier
- 1972: El negocio del odio
- 1972: El carruaje .... Teniente Azcárate
- 1972: Las gemelas .... Leonardo Lobo
- 1971: Velo de Novia
- 1971: Los destrampados
- 1970: Paraíso .... Lauro
- 1970: La rebelion de las hijas
- 1970: El cinico .... Rogelio
- 1970: Los juniors
- 1970: Juan el desalmado
- 1970: Las tres magnificas
- 1970: Tres amigos
- 1970: La sonrisa del diablo .... Carlos
- 1969: Super Colt 38 .... Roy
- 1969: Minifaldas con espuelas
- 1969: Pacto diabólico
- 1968: Los asesinos .... Joseph Nelson
- 1968: House of Evil .... Beasley
- 1968: Muchachas, muchachas, muchachas
- 1967: Chanoc .... Chanoc ... a.k.a. "Aventuras de mar y selva"

== Stage ==
- "Juguetes Para el Matrimonio"
- "Las Buenas Personas"
- "Las Buenas Imagenes Publicas"
- "Accidente Conyugal"
- "Amor es"
- "La Libelula"
- "Las Locuras del Sexo"
- "Un Loco Genial"
- "Las Mentiras Blancas y la Comedia Negra"
- "Me Dicen Pedro, el Hombre de la Navaja"
