= Beauties of the Night (2016 film) =

- Directed by: María José Cuevas
- Produced by: Manuel Alcalá; Juan Pablo Bastarrachea; Moisés Cosío; María José Cuevas; Gerardo Gatica; Alberto Muffelmann; Jaime Bernardo Ramos; Christian Valdelièvre
- Starring: Olga Breeskin; Lyn May; Rossy Mendoza; Wanda Seux; Princesa Yamal
- Cinematography: María José Cuevas; Mark Powell
- Edited by: Ximena Cuevas
- Music by: Herminio Gutiérrez
- Distributed by: CinePantera; Detalle Films
- Release dates: September 12, 2016 (Toronto); November 26, 2016 (México)
- Running time: 93 minutes
- Country: Mexico
- Language: Spanish

Beauties of the Night (in Spanish Bellas de noche) is a 2016 Mexican documentary film. It is the first production of the filmmaker María José Cuevas. The film shows a glimpse of the glory, sunset and resurgence of five of the main showgirls (vedettes) that triumphed in Mexico in the decades of the 1970s and 1980s.

== Synopsis ==
They were the Queens of the Night in Mexico in the 1970's and 1980's. The names of the great vedettes illuminated the streets of Mexico City from the canopies of the big nightclubs, cabarets and theaters. But time passed. Nightlife changed in Mexico. New types of entertainment replaced them and the vedettes seemed to have been forgotten.

Today, more than forty years of its splendor in the country's nightlife, Beauties of the Night explores the lives of five of the top vedettes of the golden years: Olga Breeskin, Lyn May, Rossy Mendoza, Wanda Seux and Princesa Yamal. The film shows the viewer a deeper facet of the current life of these five vedettes. Women who, despite the years and have taken their lives to the extreme, are full of life and with an enviable physical condition. Not only have they managed to reinvent themselves and survive in the show business, but also in life itself. Between laughter and tears, the film reflects the passage of years, emotions and personal challenges for the life of each of these women.

== Cast ==
- Olga Breeskin
- Lyn May
- Rossy Mendoza
- Wanda Seux
- Princesa Yamal

== Production ==
The title of the documentary evokes the film Bellas de noche, the first film of the so-called Cine de ficheras, which dates back to 1975.

The idea of Cuevas to pay homage to these women arises from her childhood. Cuevas, daughter of the prestigious Mexican artist José Luis Cuevas, had contact with several of these women, who were friends of her father. Years later, Cuevas had a meeting with Princesa Yamal, who performed an Arab dance in front of her, giving her the idea of producing this documentary, whose realization lasted for a decade. The film delivers an exercise in which the contrasts of time come to light and unveils what lies behind the stardom. You can appreciate an honest, dynamic and effective exercise in which remains the curiosity to know more details. Although the documentary came from the idea of paying homage to these women, the relationship between them and the filmmaker María José Cuevas, became so close that they became a family. The vedettes Thelma Tixou, Sasha Montenegro and Princesa Lea were also considered to participate in the documentary, refusing for various reasons. The last two appear in the final credits in the acknowledgments section. The film is also favored by an enriching archive material.

== Awards ==
=== Morelia International Film Festival ===
- Best Mexican Documentary
- Best Mexican Documentary realized by a woman
- Best Mexican Feature film

=== Los Cabos International Film Festival ===
- Audience Award for a Mexican Documentary film

=== Mexico City Awards ===
- Best Film

=== Panama International Film Festival ===
- Best Documentary film

=== Ariel Award ===
- Best Film (Nominated)
- Best Mexican Documentary Film (Nominated)
- Best Edition (Nominated)
- Best First Production (Nominated)

=== Other ===
- International Documentary Film Festival Amsterdam - Official Selection.
- Toronto Film Festival - Official Selection
- Telluride Film Festival - Official Selection
- Cartagena of Indias International Film Festival - Official Selection
- Palm Springs International Film Festival - Official selection
- Buenos Aires International Festival of Independent Cinema - Official Selection
- Film Society of Lincoln Center - Special Projection
- Festival Cinema du Monde (Sherbrooke, Nova Scotia) - Official Selection
- Mexico Now Festival New York - Official Selection
