= Olga Breeskin =

Mexican violinist, dancer and actress

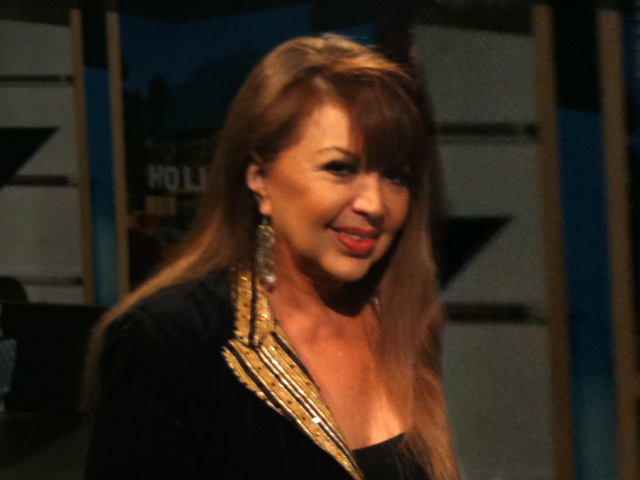
- Born: Olga Breeskin Torres; 22 September 1951 (age 75); Mexico City, Mexico
- Citizenship: Mexico
- Occupations: actress, dancer, violinist
- Children: 1

Olga Breeskin Torres (born September 22, 1951) is a Mexican violinist, dancer and actress. She was one of the most famous Mexican vedettes in 1970s and 1980s.

== Early life ==
Olga Breeskin was born in Mexico City. She is the daughter of Ukrainian-Jewish violinist and conductor Elias Breeskin.

== Career ==
Breeskin rose to fame in the 1970s for her cabaret act, where she danced and shimmied in French-cut leotards while playing the violin. She became the headliner in the nightclub "Belvedere", located in the penthouse of the Hotel Continental. (It was previously known as the Hilton Hotel). Her Hotel Continental nightclub act was based on a Las Vegas-style show that had numerous back-up dancers and a full show band to accompany Breeskin. The opening song for her show was "Todos Queremos Ver A Olga (We all Want to See Olga)". The television network Televisa, developed a 30-second TV commercial, where Olga wore a French-cut leotard with dangly sequined ribbon strips that flew away from her body as she spun around, she stopped, put her hand on her hip and with the other hand motioned "to come here." It was a lusty commercial for conservative Mexico. But Mexico was hypnotized with Breeskin's charms. For years, every night her performances were sold out. Nightclubs led to films. Her most recognizable movie was Nora la rebelde. She was considered for many years the number one female entertainer in Mexico. The Mexican press called her "The Number One" or "Super Olga". But the Hotel Continental was completely destroyed in the 1985 Mexico City earthquake. In the 1990s, Breeskin appeared in some television programs and Mexican telenovelas, before moving to Las Vegas.

Currently Breeskin presently lives and works in Las Vegas, NV. She has a popular radio show and occasionally performs her nightclub act. On September 5, 2014, Breeskin performed for the Alonzo De Leon Middle School orchestra class. Honors students were delighted by her.

In 2016, Breeskin, along with other vedettes like Lyn May, Rossy Mendoza, Wanda Seux and Princesa Yamal, stars in the documentary film Beauties of the Night, by the filmmaker María José Cuevas.

== Filmography ==
=== Films ===
- México de noche (1968)
- Los desalmados (1971)
- Elena y Raquel (1971)
- Me he de comer esa tuna (1972)
- Lo que más queremos (1972)
- Bikinis y rock (1972)
- La disputa (1974)
- El padrino...es mi compadre (1975)
- La loca de los milagros (1975)
- Eva, ¿qué hace ese hombre en tu cama? (1975)
- El compadre más padre (1976)
- Nora la rebelde (1979)
- Beauties of the Night (2016)

=== Television ===
- Tú y yo (1996) .... Lucrecia Álvarez Albarran
- Al final del arco iris (1982) .... Elsa Rivera
- Rina (1977) .... Silvia
- El amor tiene cara de mujer (1971) .... Milena del Real
- El chofer (1974) .... Nora
