= Adelyn Dohme Breeskin =

Curator, museum director, art historian

Adelyn D. Breeskin
- Born: Adelyn Dohme; 1896; Baltimore, Maryland
- Died: 1986 (aged 89–90)
- Education: Boston School of Fine Arts, Crafts, and Decorative Design
- Occupations: Curator, museum director, and art historian
- Organization(s): Baltimore Museum of Art, Metropolitan Museum of Art, Washington Gallery of Modern Art
- Known for: Director of the Baltimore Museum of Art, scholar of Mary Cassatt
- Spouse: Elias Breeskin

Adelyn Dohme Breeskin (1896–1986) was an American curator, museum director, and art historian known for her longtime leadership of the Baltimore Museum of Art and Mary Cassatt scholarship.

== Biography ==
Adelyn Dohme was born in 1896 in Baltimore to Alfred Robert Louis Dohme and Emmie Blumner (Dohme). In 1918, she received her bachelor's degree from the Boston School of Fine Arts, Crafts, and Decorative Design. Breeskin then served as an assistant in the print department of the Metropolitan Museum of Art with Kathryn B. Child under the curator of prints, William Mills Ivins. In 1920, she married the violinist Elias Breeskin (1895–1969), but the couple divorced in 1930.

Breeskin moved to Baltimore to work as a curator in the Baltimore Museum of Art and was promoted to director of the museum in 1942. As the director of the Baltimore Museum of Art, Breeskin established a works on paper collection, supervised an exhibit of John Russell Pope, mounted the show “Abstract Expressionism,” oversaw expansion to the institution, acted as commissioner for the American Contingent of 30th Venice Biennale, and negotiated the donation of Etta and Claribel Cone Collection.

In 1962, Breeskin left the Baltimore Museum of Art to become the head of Washington Gallery of Modern Art. Breeskin curated shows such as “Roots of Abstract Art in America” in 1965, but she resigned two years later. From 1960 to 1974, she served as the curator of contemporary painting and sculpture at the National Collection of Fine Arts later called the National Museum of American Art where she featured artists such as Mary Cassatt, Milton Avery, H. Lyman Sayen, William J. Johnson, and Bob Thompson.

In 1972, Dohme signed her name to the Ms. campaign: “We Have Had Abortions” which called for an end to "archaic laws" limiting reproductive freedom, they encouraged women to share their stories and take action.

=== Mary Cassatt ===
Beginning her research in the 1940s, Breeskin authored two catalogue raisonnés on Cassatt’s paintings, oils, and pastels and Cassatt’s watercolors and drawings. She acted as curator of the Cassatt retrospective exhibition at the National Gallery of Art in 1970 though she was simultaneously working on the Sayn and Johnson shows. Several hours a week, Breeskin devoted time to adding information to her catalogues and answering numerous questions from collectors from around the world.

=== Awards ===
1956 President of the Association of Art Museum Directors, 1976 Katherine Caffey Award for Distinguished Accomplishment in the Museum Profession, 1984 Saluted by Women’s caucus of the American Association of Museums as “an exemplary model whose distinguished career is permanently etched in the fertile ground of American art history.”, 1985 Smithsonian Institution presented her their highest award, the Gold Medal for Exceptional Service

== See also ==
- Women in the art history field
