= Spicy Chile =

- Directed by: René Cardona Jr.
- Written by: René Cardona Jr. Juan Fernando Pérez Gavilán; Gregorio Walerstein
- Produced by: René Cardona Jr.
- Starring: Andrés García; Angélica Chain; Alberto Rojas
- Cinematography: Daniel López
- Edited by: Rafael Ceballos
- Music by: Gustavo César Carrión
- Production companies: Cinematográfica Filmex S.A. Productora Fílmica Real
- Release date: 5 May 1983
- Running time: 78 minutes
- Country: Mexico
- Language: Spanish

Spicy Chile (Spanish:Chile picante) is a 1983 Mexican comedy film directed by René Cardona Jr., starring Andrés García, Angélica Chain, and Alberto Rojas.

The film is also known in Mexico as Sexo a la mexicana. The film consists of two segments: "La infidelidad" (Infidelity) and "Los compadres".

== Cast ==
=== Segment "La infidelidad" ===
- Andrés García
- Angélica Chain
- Alberto Rojas
- Alfredo Wally Barrón
- Karen Castello
- Alma Estela
- Irene Gallegos
- Juan Jaramillo
- Norma Lee
- Carlos Monden
- Lourdes Morales
- Polo Ortín
- Juan Carlos Peralta
- Sofia Vargas
- Sybille Young
- Gerardo Zepeda

=== Segment "Los compadres" ===
- Blanca Guerra
- Héctor Suárez
- Princesa Lea
- María Cardinal .
- Eduardo de la Peña
- Tito Junco
- Jeannette Mass
- Lyn May .
- Pedro Weber 'Chatanuga'

== Reception ==
El Mundo notes that in the two segments, sex is as central a topic as hot sauce. Multiplatform Media in Mexico indeed noted that the title of the film was self-explanatory, while Cinema of Solitude: A Critical Study of Mexican Film, 1967-1983 saw in it one of various films of Cardona Jr. based on the same narrative pattern. Contrapunto found the film was "a stupid comedy, very cheap under all aspects". MiTv found the two comedic segments "hilarious".

== Bibliography ==
- Charles Ramírez Berg. Cinema of Solitude: A Critical Study of Mexican Film, 1967-1983. University of Texas Press, 2010.
