= La vida difícil de una mujer fácil =

- Starring: Sara García
- Release date: 1979
- Running time: 86 minute
- Country: Mexico
- Language: Spanish

La vida difícil de una mujer fácil ("The Difficult Life of an Easy Woman") is a 1979 Mexican film. It stars Sara García.

== Plot ==
During the wake of the recently-deceased sex-worker Violeta, several men recall how she helped them through her work.
