= Lyn May =

Mexican actress and vedette (born 1952)

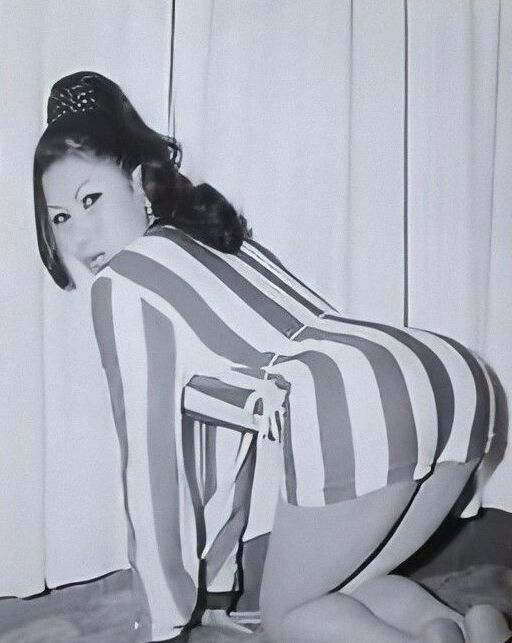
- Lyn May in 1975
- Born: Lilia Guadalupe Mendiola Mayares; 12 December 1952 (age 73); Nuxco, Tecpan de Galeana, Guerrero, Mexico
- Occupations: Vedette; Actress; Dancer
- Years active: 1970–present
- Spouse(s): Antonio Chi-Xuo (m. 1989; died 2008) Guillermo Calderón Stell (m. 2008; died 2018)
- Children: 2

Lilia Guadalupe Mendiola Mayares (born 12 December 1952), better known by her stage name Lyn May, is a Mexican vedette, exotic dancer, and actress. She was one of the most popular Mexican vedette during the 1970s and 1980s, a popular sex symbol, and one of the main stars of Ficheras cinema.

== Early life ==
May was born in Nuxco, Tecpan de Galeana, Guerrero, Mexico; her mother and father had immigrated from Yantai, China in 1948. She was the eldest of five siblings and began working at the age of four. She sold souvenirs to tourists and sweets made by her grandmother. She also sold chewing gum at weddings in the villages near Acapulco. She did not attend school since there were no schools in her village.

At age 13, she worked as a waitress in a restaurant where she met a 40-year old sailor who promised to get her out of poverty. He came to visit her every day for a month, allegedly brainwashing her. They went to Mexico City, where he raped her in a hotel room, causing her to become pregnant. She said that she was so ignorant at the time, she expected to give birth through her mouth. May's grandmother forced her to marry the man after she became pregnant; the marriage was illegal due to her age. Her rapist did not want children and beat May after marrying. After five years of marriage and the birth of two daughters, Lilia separated from her rapist due to the domestic violence and sexual abuse.

== Career ==
Lilia then moved to Acapulco, where she worked in the cabaret El Zorro, as a dancer and also worked as a waitress and in beauty salons to support her daughters.

She worked at the Tropicana cabaret in Acapulco, where she performed with Germán Valdés ("Tin Tan").

When she was approximately 17 years old, Lilia worked for television presenter Raul Velasco as a dancer in the program Siempre en Domingo. There, she danced with Olga Breeskin and learned to dance tribal, Hawaiian, and Tahitian dances. She was also pressured by Velasco to wear more revealing outfits, showing her underwear.

In 1970, Lilia was hired by Enrique Lombardini, who at that time managed the Teatro Esperanza Iris. However, she was booed at first for not performing nude. A week later, Lilia performed her first nude, becoming a sensation among the male audience. Lombardini bestowed on her the pseudonym "Lyn May: The Goddess of Love".

In 1974, filmmaker Alberto Isaac chose Lyn as one of the main protagonists of Tívoli, which portrays with nostalgia the nocturnal atmosphere of Mexico City in the 1940s and 1950s. After the success of the film, May landed roles in Carnival Nights (1978), The Loving Ones (1979), and Spicy Chile (1983).

In 1991, she participated in the telenovela Yo no creo en los hombres, produced by Televisa.

In 1998, May participated in the music video of the song Mr. P. Mosh by Plastilina Mosh.

In 2016, May appeared in a music video of the song Si tu me quisieras by Mon Laferte.

In 2016, May was featured in Beauties of the Night by María José Cuevas.

As of 2021, May worked as a Tahitian dance instructor at the Plaza Caribe Hotel in Cancun, Mexico and gave performances on weekends.

Since 2019, she has also appeared several times as a guest on the Univision television show El Gordo y La Flaca.

== Personal life ==
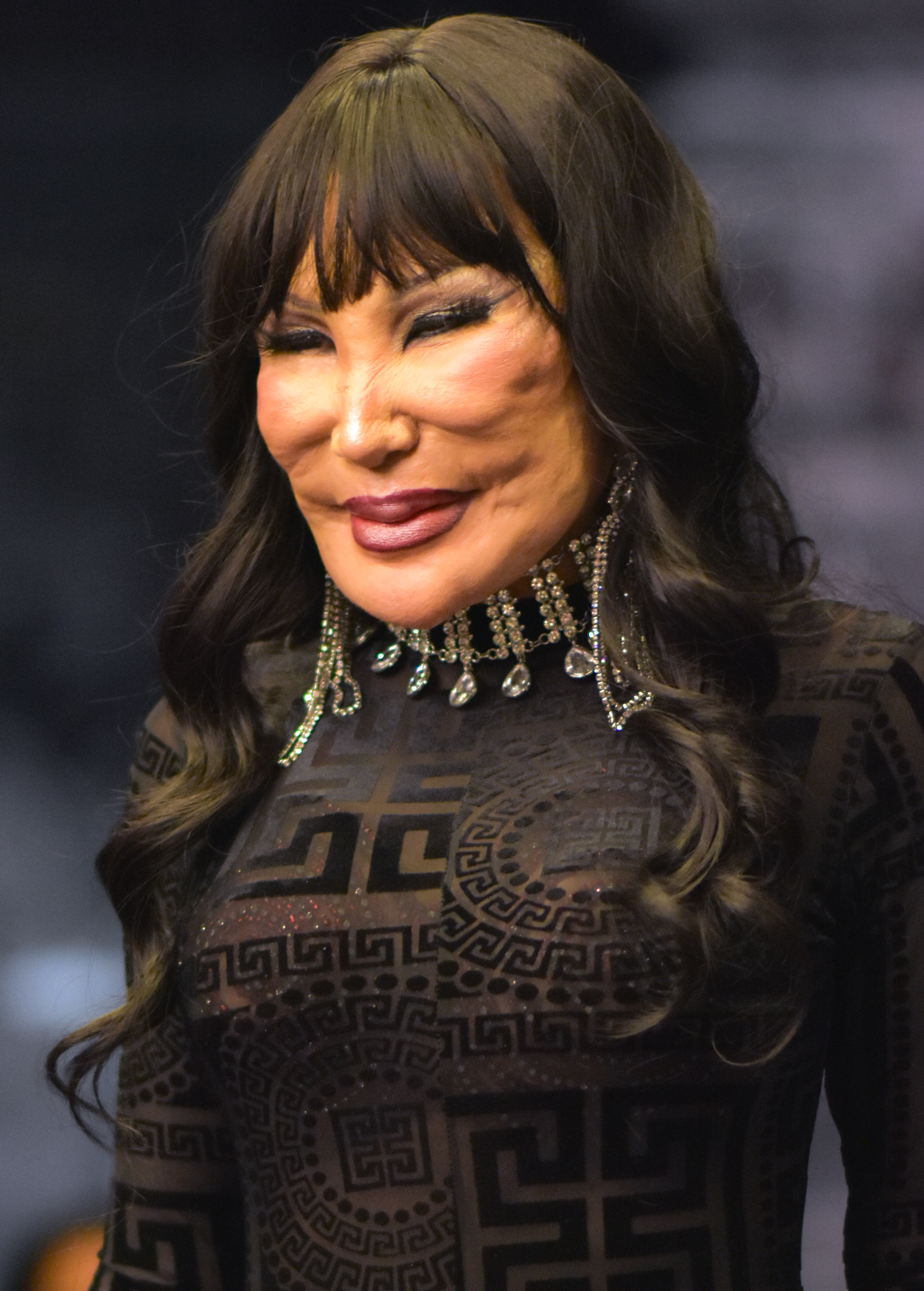
Lyn May in 2025.

May has said she had an affair with an unnamed former President of Mexico speculated to be José López Portillo, who also had an affair with, and later married, actress Sasha Montenegro.

May married businessman Antonio Chi Su in 1988. They opened a Chinese restaurant on Avenida Bucareli in Mexico City. Chi Su was diagnosed with prostate cancer in 2004 and died in 2008; May inherited the restaurant. She confirmed that after his death, she exhumed her husband's corpse and slept by it, attributing this act to deep grief.

May married film producer Guillermo Calderón Stell in 2008 and was widowed in 2018.

In August 2021, May announced that she was pregnant at 68 years old, reportedly by Markos D1, a 29-year old Mexican singer. Markos later denied the pregnancy and any relationship, claiming it was a publicity stunt for a music video.

=== Facial disfigurement ===
In the 1990s, at the advice of a "friend" later accused of jealousy, May received facial injections of what she thought was collagen to maintain a youthful appearance but later learned was a combination of cooking oil and baby oil. No negative side effects were felt in the short term, but the procedure eventually resulted in serious abscess in her face. May underwent multiple surgeries to remove the foreign material but her face remains disfigured.

== Filmography ==
- Tívoli (1974)
- Carnival Nights (1978)
- The Loving Ones (1979)
- Spicy Chile (1983)
- Beauties of the Night (2016)
