= La reina del mambo =

- Directed by: Ramón Pereda
- Written by: Adolfo Ferna´ndez Bustamante; Ramón Pereda
- Produced by: Ramón Pereda
- Starring: María Antonieta Pons; Sara García; Gustavo Rojo
- Cinematography: Domingo Carrillo
- Music by: Manuel Esperón
- Distributed by: Pereda Films
- Release date: 28 February 1951
- Running time: 99 minutes
- Country: Mexico
- Language: Spanish

La reina del mambo (The Queen of the Mambo), also known as Sin tí (Without You) is a 1951 Mexican drama film by Ramón Pereda. It stars María Antonieta Pons and Sara García.

== Plot ==
Consuelo (María Antonieta Pons), infatuated with the scoundrel Victor (Eduardo Noriega), breaks up with her boyfriend Luis (Gustavo Rojo), an attorney. Consuelo's father Balderas, a judge, warns her against Victor. Victor drugs and seduces the young girl and takes her to Ciudad Juarez, where she is sexually assaulted. Consuelo, on the advice of her friend La Norteña, escapes to Mexico City and finds success as a cabaret dancer. She became known as Carmen La Tirana ('Carmen the tyrant') for the harshness with which she treats men. Victor comes looking for her and conflicts develop in the plot. The girl is unfairly sent to prison, where she is helped by a friendly old drunk woman (Sara García), who turns out in reality to be a very rich woman.

== Cast ==
- María Antonieta Pons ... Consuelo / Carmen La Tirana
- Sara García ... Tía
- Gustavo Rojo ... Luis
- Eduardo Noriega ... Victor
- José Baviera
- Roberto Cobo

== Reviews ==
The communicating vessels of the film melodrama are infinite: The director, Ramón Pereda baptized to the rumbera heroine with a Spanish nickname; and the maternal protection of Sara García, who in other melodramas has proved to be a fierce advocate of the virtue. But Sara García was not a sweet grandmother as usual; instead she plays a drunkard, perhaps on the inspiration of Libertad Lamarque in the film La Marquesa del barrio. Of course, Damaso Perez Prado contributed music to this film: the mambo El ruletero.
