= Tulevieja =

Legendary figure from Costa Rican and Panamanian folklore

La Tulevieja (also spelled Tulivieja) is a legendary figure from Costa Rican and Panamanian folklore. She is a ghost who wears a distinctive hat called a tule.

== Description ==
In most versions, the Tulevieja is described as a short woman of heavy build who wears a drooping hat (an old, wrinkled tule), is poorly dressed and has tangled hair. She generally appears with her chest bare, showing two enormous breasts so full of breast milk that it overflows, which is why it is common to see large numbers of ants of many kinds following the trail of milk behind the creature.

She is also commonly described as a hybrid of woman and bird (similar to a harpy): she has powerful wings, sometimes those of a bird and sometimes those of a bat (depending on the version), but her most characteristic features are her legs and claws of an eagle or hawk instead of human legs, which leave reversed footprints so that she cannot be followed. She is said to feed on charcoal and ashes, which is why it is common to find her tracks around recently extinguished campfires.

Further removed from her incarnation as a restless spirit, she is also depicted as a female vengeful spirit who punishes lustful men—the figure of the irresponsible father of her child—who, attracted by her large breasts, invite her to dance only to meet death, torn apart by the monster's claws. The only way to save oneself once encountering her is to recite the prayer "Alabado sea el Santísimo" ("Praised be the Most Holy Sacrament"), which causes her to take flight and disappear toward the sun. In the Indigenous legend, however, the only way to defend oneself from the creature was through the use of vines made of blessed tule by the god Sibú, which had the power to bind the Tulevieja.

== Legend ==
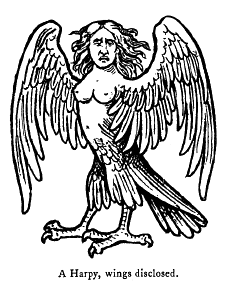
Representation of a harpy similar to the Tulevieja

In the legend, a beautiful girl had a secret relationship with a man from her town, resulting in pregnancy. She drowned the child in a river and was punished by God by being transformed into a hideous creature (in some versions she drowns herself as well). She is a short woman with a thick body, swollen breasts, sometimes leaking milk, and tangled hair. She is often described with bird or bat wings, similar to a harpy, and with inverted legs of a bird of prey. Swarms of ants often follow her, drinking milk that falls to the ground.

La Tulevieja has been syncretized with La Llorona in some places, and in those versions of the legend she seeks out babies to feed them milk to, sometimes stealing them. In some interpretations, she is an avenging spirit, punishing lustful men and irresponsible fathers. The only way to escape her clutches is to recite a certain prayer.

The legend has its roots in Talamancan mythology, in Itsö, a spirit of mountains, wind, and rain (though the name can also be used generically to refer to any demon). Itsö demanded the right to eat the first human beings due to help he gave the god Sibú.

The name Tulevieja comes from the tule hat she wears, and in some versions of the story, the plant is a defense against her. Tule can refer to several plants, including Schoenoplectus acutus, Taxodium mucronatum, and Pontederia.

In the mythology of the Ngäbe-Buglé, she is called Tepesa.

== Origin of the myth ==
The origin of the name is related to the tule hat: Tulevieja, an old tule or an old woman with a tule (the meaning varies depending on the version of the legend). The tule, a handmade hat made of straw—pointed and pulled down to the eyes, usually blackened by stains from plantain or coffee—was used by peasant women to protect themselves from the sun or rain, as well as from insects, especially wasps that often become tangled in the hair. The word tule is a term from a Mesoamerican language referring to species of rushes or vines. Both in the Bribri myth and in more recent versions of the legend, the tule vine served as a defense against the power of the monster (called the vine of Sibú or of Yazú, depending on the version).

The Tulevieja as such is a being from the underworld already mentioned in Bribri mythology (whose settlements are said to have been located in the territory of Talamanca, on the border between Costa Rica and Panama, which explains why the myth is shared by both countries), and it is likewise a myth shared by the Huetar and Cabécar peoples. The origin of the story would trace back to the adaptation of Indigenous cosmogony by the oral traditions of the Spanish colonizers. In the Indigenous worldview, the Tulevieja is associated with dark and tangled forests, mountain abysses, heavy rains and winds, and river waterfalls. In the suwoh or oral tradition of the Bribri, the original name of the Tulevieja would be Itsa' or Itsö.

In more recent versions of the story, the Tulevieja appears with details resembling the Sphinx or the Greek sirens: an indistinct mane of hair, upright breasts, graceful arms, birdlike legs and claws instead of human legs, and short wings; she may even invite her victims to dance, like a decadent version of the riddles of the Sphinx of Greek mythology or the song of the sirens, before ultimately devouring them.

=== The Bribri myth ===
In the Bribri myth, the Tulevieja is an Itsö, a demonic being predating the Indigenous world, of great strength and capable of taking various forms.

== Bibliography ==
- Jara, Carla Victoria; García Segura, Alí (2003). Diccionario de mitología bribri [Dictionary of Bribri Mythology] (in Spanish). San José: Editorial de la Universidad de Costa Rica. ISBN 9977-67-738-7. OCLC 53238389.
- Medina, Andrés (1996). La etnografía de Mesoamérica Meridional y el área Circuncaribe [The Ethnography of Southern Mesoamerica and the Circum-Caribbean Area] (in Spanish) (1st ed.). México, DF: Universidad Nacional Autónoma de México, Instituto de Investigaciones Antropológicas. p. 386. ISBN 968-36-4847-9. OCLC 39077525.
- Zeledón Cartín, Elías (2000). Leyendas costarricenses [Costa Rican Legends]. Heredia, Costa Rica: EUNA.
