= The Maragatan Sphinx =

- Directed by: Antonio de Obregón
- Written by: Concha Espina (novel); Selma Barberi; José Luis Gamboa; Antonio de Obregón
- Produced by: Antonio de Obregón
- Starring: Paquita de Ronda
- Cinematography: Alfonso Nieva
- Edited by: Julio Peña
- Music by: Jesús García Leoz
- Production companies: Antonio de Obregón P.C.; España Actualidades
- Distributed by: C.B. Films
- Release date: 26 January 1950
- Running time: 85 minutes
- Country: Spain
- Language: Spanish

The Maragatan Sphinx (Spanish:La esfinge maragata) is a 1950 Spanish drama film directed by Antonio de Obregón and starring Paquita de Ronda. It takes its title from the Maragatería region.

== Synopsis ==
The action takes place in a Maragata hacienda that is sinking into misery, whose situation can only be resolved through a marriage of convenience. But the marriageable girl, during a train trip, falls in love with a young poet and is reciprocated. Her family opposes this relationship, since they have promised her in marriage with a man of good position.

== Cast ==
- Paquita de Ronda as Mariflor Salvadores
- Luis Peña as Rogelio
- Juan José Martínez Casado as Antonio Salvadores
- Juan de Landa as Tío Cristóbal
- Fernando Fernández de Córdoba
- Carmen Reyes
- Julia Caba Alba as Tía de Mariflor
- Gabriel Algara
- Juana Mansó
- Julia Pachelo
- Manena Algora
- Emilio Pages
- Concha López Silva
- Mari Paz Molinero

== Bibliography ==
- Nicolás Fernández-Medina & Maria Truglio. Modernism and the Avant-garde Body in Spain and Italy. Routledge, 2016.
