= Juan José Martínez Casado =

Cuban actor

- Born: 12 July 1903; Gibara, Cuba
- Died: 29 May 1987 (aged 83); Mexico City, Mexico
- Occupation: Actor
- Years active: 1929–1982 (film)

Juan José Martínez Casado (1903–1987) was a Cuban film actor. He appeared in many Mexican films including during the Golden Age of Mexican Cinema. He also directed two films in the early 1950s including A Gypsy in Havana.

== Selected filmography ==
- Santa (1932)
- Martín Garatuza (1935)
- Malditas sean las mujeres (1936)
- Such Is My Country (1937)
- Huapango (1938)
- The Girl's Aunt (1938)
- Divorced (1943)
- Cruel Destiny (1944)
- Country Corner (1950)
- The Maragatan Sphinx (1950)
- A Gypsy in Havana (1950)
- Mission to the North of Seoul (1953)
- The White Rose (1954)
- La Llorona (1960)
- The Incredible Professor Zovek (1972)
- The Holy Office (1974)
- Tívoli (1974)

== Bibliography ==
- Hershfield, Joanne & Maciel, David R. Mexico's Cinema: A Century of Film and Filmmakers. Rowman & Littlefield Publishers, 1999. ISBN 978-0-8420-2681-9.
- Jarvinen, Lisa. The Rise of Spanish-language Filmmaking: Out from Hollywood's Shadow, 1929-1939. Rutger's University Press, 2012. ISBN 978-0-8135-5328-3.
- Poppe, Nicolas. Alton's Paradox: Foreign Film Workers and the Emergence of Industrial Cinema in Latin America. State University of New York Press, 2021. ISBN 978-1-4384-8505-8.
