= María Cristina (film) =

1951 film

María Crstina
- Directed by: Ramón Pereda
- Written by: Ramón Pereda; Ramón Pérez Peláez
- Produced by: Ramón Pereda
- Starring: María Antonieta Pons; Carlos Cores; Fernando Casanova; Prudencia Grifell
- Cinematography: Domingo Carrillo
- Music by: Manuel Esperón
- Distributed by: Pereda Films
- Release date: November 15, 1951 (México)
- Running time: 89 min
- Country: Mexico
- Language: Spanish

María Cristina is a Mexican drama film directed by Ramón Pereda. It was released in 1951, starring María Antonieta Pons and Carlos Cores. The film was inspired in the song María Cristina me quiere gobernar by Ñico Saquito.

== Plot ==
Maria Cristina (María Antonieta Pons) is an unemployed provincial young girl reaching Mexico City accompanied by her grandmother (Prudencia Grifell) settling in a neighborhood. A neighbor recommends working in a cabaret behind her grandmother. There, Maria Cristina finds the love.

== Cast ==
- María Antonieta Pons ... María Cristina
- Carlos Cores
- Fernando Casanova
- Prudencia Grifell ... María Cristina's grandmother
- Carolina Barret

== Reviews ==
The film premiered in four rooms of Mexico City in 1951. The journalist Mauricio Peña related in his analysis of this film for the magazine Somos in 1999: We assure you that is not easy to recover after seeing María Antonieta Pons in "Maria Cristina", because even the conventional story, is the absolute pinnacle of the art of this beautiful Cuban rumbera.
