= A Gypsy in Jalisco =

1947 film

- Directed by: José Díaz Morales
- Written by: Octavio Alba; José Díaz Morales
- Produced by: Paul Castelain
- Starring: Paquita de Ronda; Ángel Garasa; Felipe de Alba
- Cinematography: Ross Fisher
- Edited by: Alfredo Rosas Priego
- Production company: Producciones Calderón
- Distributed by: Azteca Films
- Release date: 5 January 1947
- Running time: 80 minutes
- Country: Mexico
- Language: Spanish

A Gypsy in Jalisco (Spanish: Una gitana en Jalisco) is a 1947 Mexican comedy film directed by José Díaz Morales and starring Paquita de Ronda, Ángel Garasa and Felipe de Alba.

== Cast ==
- Paquita de Ronda as María Antonia
- Ángel Garasa as Don Faraón
- Felipe de Alba as Carlos
- Ildefonso Sánchez Curiel as Macario
- Celeste Grijo as Tina la Antillana
- Julio Ahuet as El Pirulí
- Linda Gorráez as Anita
- Jorge Mondragón as Sacerdote
- Jorge Rachini as Don Locutor
- Roberto Corell as Cliente afeminado
- Jorge Sareli as Engañador
- Nicolás Rodríguez as Don Casimiro
- Jorge Reyes

== Bibliography ==
- Gubern, Román. Cine español en el exilio, 1936-1939. Lumen, 1976.
- Riera, Emilio García. Historia documental del cine mexicano: 1946–1948. Universidad de Guadalajara, 1992.
