= Cihuacōātl =

Aztec goddess

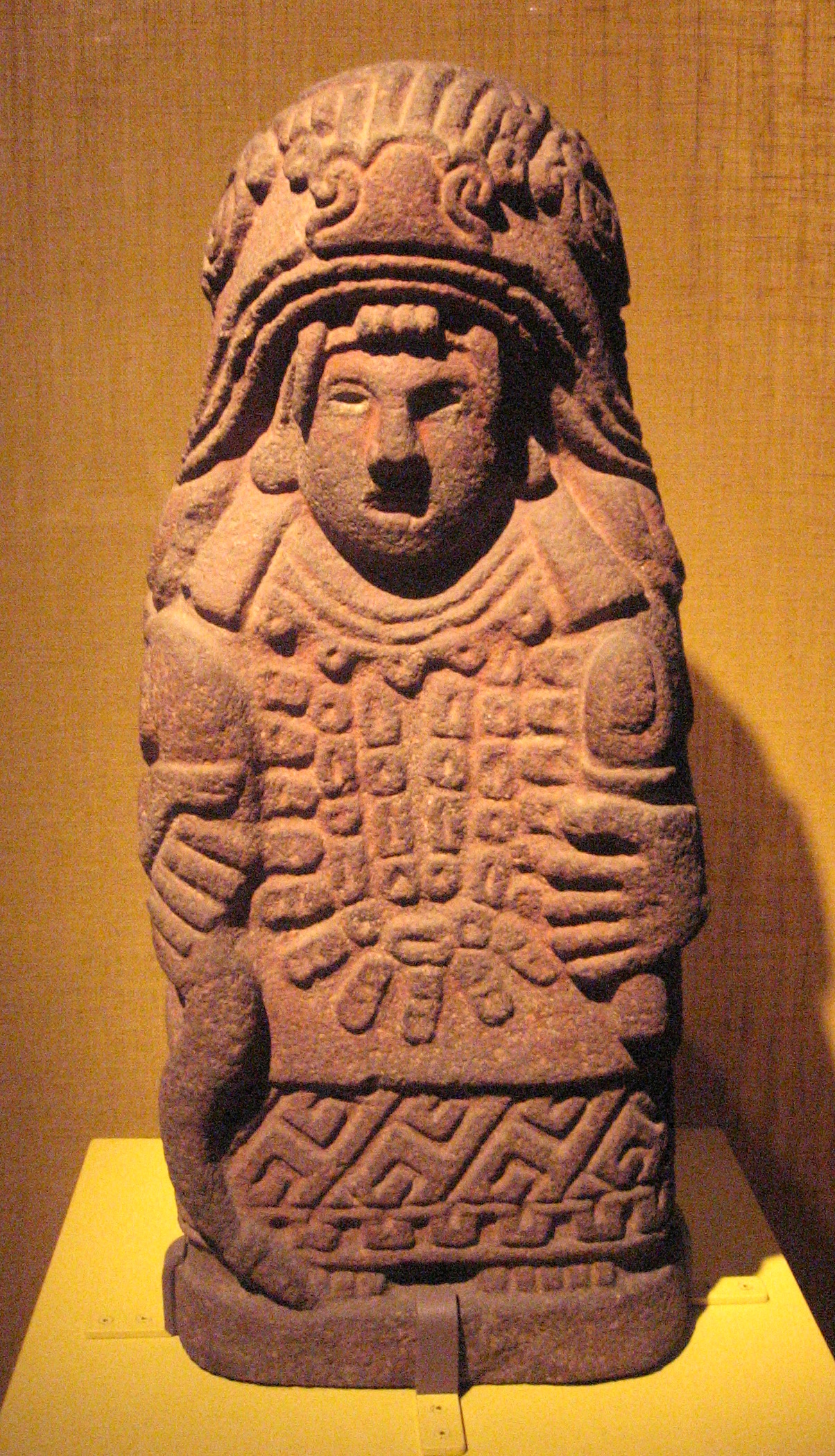
Stone statue of Cihuacōātl, showing her framed by the mouth of a serpent, holding an ear of maize in her left hand.

Cihuacōātl (Note: Nahuatl pronunciation: [s̻iwaˈkoː(ʷ)aːt͡ɬ], "snake woman", also Cihuacóatl) was one of a number of motherhood and fertility goddesses (Note: See also Ilamatecuhtli, Teteoinnan, Tlazolteotl, and Toci.) in Aztec mythology. She was sometimes known as Quilaztli.

Cihuacōātl was especially associated with midwives, and with the sweat lodges where midwives practiced. She is paired with Quilaztli and was considered a protectress of the Chalmeca people and patroness of the city of Culhuacan. She helped Quetzalcoatl create the current race of humanity by grinding up bones from the previous ages, and mixing it with his blood. She is also the mother of Mixcoatl, whom she abandoned at a crossroads. Tradition says that she often returns there to weep for her lost son, only to find a sacrificial knife.

Cihuacōātl held political symbolism as she represented victory for the Mexica state and the ruling class.

Although she was sometimes depicted as a young woman, similar to Xōchiquetzal, she is more often shown as a fierce skull-faced old woman carrying the spears and shield of a warrior. Childbirth was sometimes compared to warfare, and the women who died in childbirth were honored as fallen warriors. Their spirits, the Cihuateteo, were depicted with skeletal faces like Cihuacōātl. Like her, the Cihuateteo were thought to haunt crossroads at night to steal children.

== Functionary of Tenochtitlan ==
The word cihuacoatl was also used as a title for a male high official in Aztec society, second-in-command to the tlatoani (Nahuatl word for ruler), and acted as his chief advisor and ceremonial substitute. Seen metaphorically as a type of consort, the man named as cihuacoatl embodied Cihuacōātl's female principles. Together, both rulers represented male and female ideals for parents in Aztec society, both seen as necessary for good governance. While the cihuacoatl supervised the internal affairs of the land, the tlatoani oversaw the affairs of the Mexica state.

The cihuacoatl commanded the army of Tenochtitlan to the emperor. During the course of the 15th century AD, Tlacaelel served as cihuacoatl under four emperors: Moctezuma I, Axayacatl, Tizoc and Ahuizotl.

== See also ==
- La Llorona (a similar modern myth)
