= Paquita de Ronda =

Spanish singer and film actress

- Born: 30 November 1926; Benaguasil, Spain
- Died: 1 June 2009 (aged 82); Mexico City, Mexico
- Other name: Francisca Cervera Durán
- Occupations: Actress, singer
- Years active: 1945–1958 (film)

Paquita de Ronda (1926–2009) was a Spanish singer and film actress. She played the lead role in the 1950 film The Maragatan Sphinx (1950).

== Selected filmography ==
- A Gypsy in Jalisco (1947)
- The Maragatan Sphinx (1950)
- Country Corner (1950)
- A Gypsy in Havana (1950)
- Mission to the North of Seoul (1953)

== Bibliography ==
- Goble, Alan. The Complete Index to Literary Sources in Film. Walter de Gruyter, 1999.
