= A Gypsy in Havana =

1950 film

- Directed by: Juan José Martínez Casado
- Written by: María Julia Casanova
- Produced by: Salvador Behar
- Starring: Paquita de Ronda; Juan José Martínez Casado; Florencio Castelló
- Cinematography: Ricardo Delgado
- Edited by: Mario González
- Music by: Obdulio Morales
- Production company: Latina Films
- Release date: 1950
- Running time: 92 minutes
- Country: Mexico
- Language: Spanish

A Gypsy in Havana (Spanish: Una gitana en La Habana) is a 1950 Cuban-Mexican musical comedy film directed by Juan José Martínez Casado and starring Casado, Paquita de Ronda and Florencio Castelló. Location shooting took place in Havana.

== Synopsis ==
After making his fortune in Cuba a man decides to bring over his Spanish daughter to Havana who he hasn't seen in twenty years.

== Cast ==
- Paquita de Ronda
- Juan José Martínez Casado
- Florencio Castelló
- Jose Sanabria
- Mário Martínez Casado
- Aidita Artigas
- Cándita Quintana
- Viejito Bringuier
- Lilia Lazo
- Las Mamboletas as Themselves
- Carmen Melero
- Las Mulatas de Fuego as Themselves
- Las Hermanas Márquez as Themselves
- Trio Servando Diaz as Themselves
- Pedro Vargas as Self

== Bibliography ==
- Osuna, Alfonso J. García. The Cuban Filmography: 1897 through 2001. McFarland, 2003.
- Riera, Emilio García. Historia documental del cine mexicano: 1949-1950. Universidad de Guadalajara, 1992
