= María Antonieta Pons =

Cuban-born Mexican actress (1922–2004)

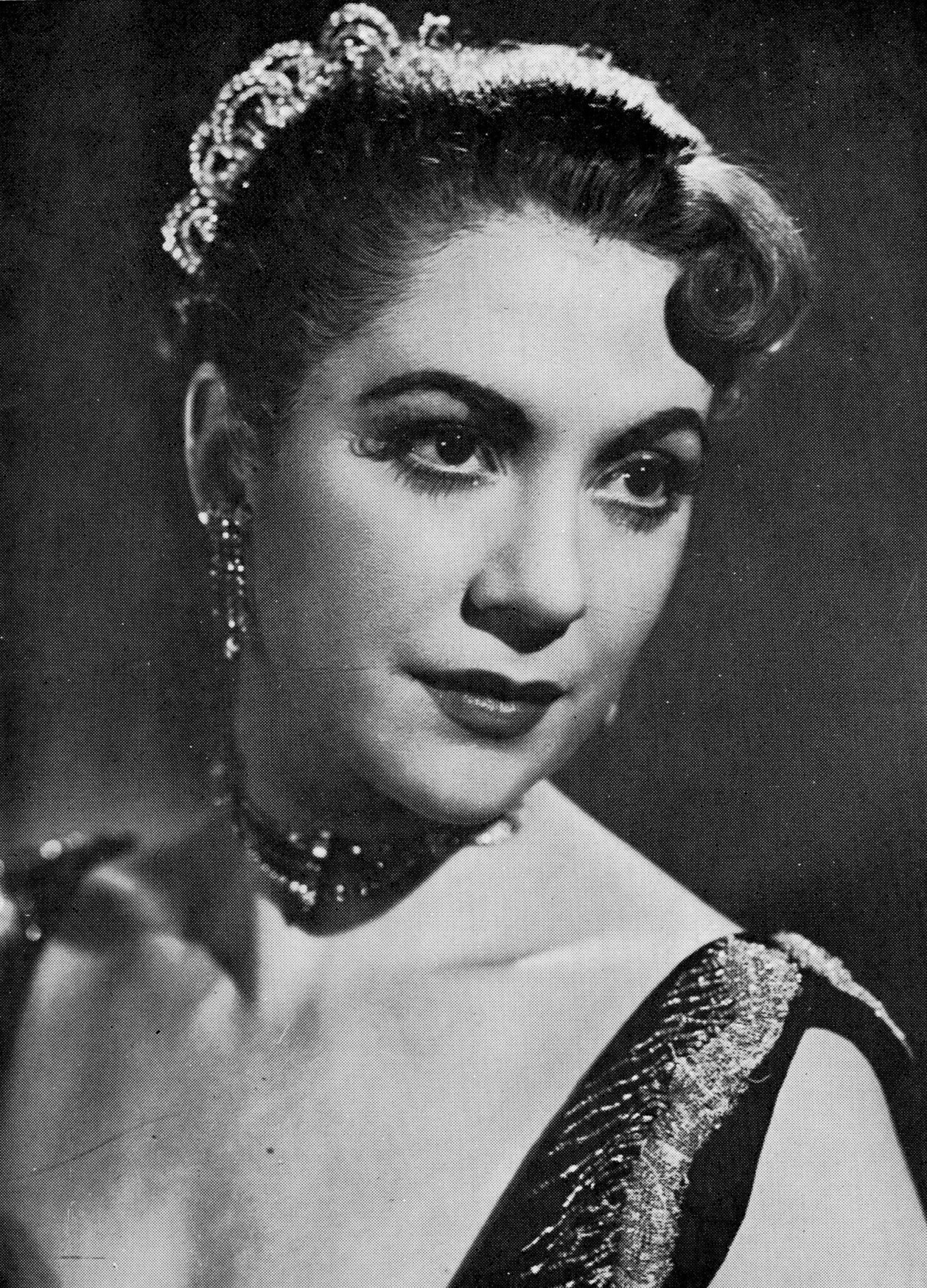
- Pons in 1954
- Born: María Antonieta Pons; November 6, 1922; La Habana, Cuba
- Died: August 20, 2004 (aged 81); Mexico City, Mexico
- Occupations: Actress, dancer and singer
- Years active: 1938–1965
- Spouse(s): Juan Orol (1940-1945); Ramón Pereda (1950-1986); Benjamín Álvarez (1989-2004)

Maria Antonieta Pons (November 6, 1922 – August 20, 2004) was a Cuban-born Mexican film actress and dancer. She was the first actress in the Rumberas films in the 1940s and 1950s, in the Golden Age of Mexican cinema. The Rumberas film genre offered a societal perspective on Mexico during the 40s-50s. It delved into the lives of women considered to be sinners or prostitutes, challenging the prevailing moral and social norms of their era.

== Career ==
María Antonieta Pons began her career as a dancer in Cuba in numerous theaters and night clubs. When she was 16, she met Spanish actor and film director Juan Orol, who became her partner in various dance competitions on the island. After becoming Orol's wife, he took her to Mexico so she could act in films.

María Antonieta Pons debuted in the Cinema of Mexico in the film Siboney (1938). After her debut in this film, Maria Antonieta performed with Orol in international dance tours in the United States, particularly in New York and Chicago. Towards the end of 1943, Pons returned to film, invited by the producer Guillermo Calderon to act in the film Noches de ronda, along with the actors Susana Guizar and Ramon Armengod. In the same year, she performed in the film Red Konga beside Pedro Armendáriz. Eventually, Pons returned to Orol's films with Cruel destino. While still an employee of Orol, Pons began shooting other films with other directors. Highlights from these films are ¡Viva mi desgracia! (1944), with Pedro Infante; Balajú (1944), along with Katy Jurado; and Rosalinda (1945), with Rafael Baledón, among others. Her last film with Orol was Pasiones tormentosas (1946).

After her break with Orol, Pons was hired by film producer Gregorio Wallerstein. Under the guidance of Wallerstein, she filmed movies like La reina del trópico (1946); La vida íntima de Marco Antonio y Cleopatra (1946), with the Argentine actor Luis Sandrini and directed by Roberto Gavaldón; La sin ventura (1947); Ángel o demonio (1947) and The Well-paid (1948), among others. In 1949, she performed in the second film version of La mujer del puerto (the first version was realized by the actress Andrea Palma in 1934), directed by Tito Davison.

Pons met her second husband, the actor and director Ramón Pereda in 1950, when he contracted her to film El ciclón del Caríbe. Pons and Pereda married soon after. With Pereda as director, Pons made films like La reina del mambo (1950), María Cristina (1950), La niña popoff (1952) and Casa de perdición (1954), among others. In 1952 she joined the Brazilian market with the film Carnaval Atlántida In the 1950s, she had famous film collaborations with Evangelina Elizondo in ¡Que bravas son las costeñas! (1955); Antonio Espino Clavillazo in Nunca me hagan eso (1956); and with Germán Valdés "Tin Tan" in Teatro del crímen (1956), Las mil y una noches (1957), La Odalísca no. 13 (1957), and Una estrella y dos estrellados (1959). Pons began alternating performances in films with performances in major theaters in Mexico City, like The Margo (today Blanquita) or the Follies Bergere.

With the decline of the Rumberas films, Pons retired from the cinema in the early sixties. Her last film was Caña brava (1965), alongside the singer Javier Solís.

=== Retirement ===
After Caña Brava, Pons's public appearances were limited. Speculation regarding the location of her residence appeared: Los Angeles, Miami, and New York have been proposed. Starting in the 1970s, she refused to have contact with the public. When her husband Ramon Pereda died, her isolation was higher. She even refused to receive a Diosa de Plata Award. Her reason was: All that can be said of me, was reflected in my films. After the death of Ramon Pereda she remarried in 1989, this time to Benjamin Alvarez.

== Death ==
María Antonieta Pons died in Mexico City on 20 August 2004. Pons had started to have mental lapses, but her death was caused by a heart attack. At her request, her death was announced after the funeral services had concluded. In several interviews, her widower denied that Pons was overweight, and held that she kept the statuesque figure that characterized her in her films. She is survived by her only daughter, Maria Guadalupe Pereda, from her second marriage.

== Filmography ==
- Siboney (1938)
- La última aventura de Chaflán (1942)
- Noche de Ronda (1942)
- Red Konga (1943)
- Balaju (1944)
- ¡Viva mi desgracia! (1944)
- Toros, amor y gloria (1944)
- Cruel Destiny (1944)
- Los misterios del hampa (1945)
- Rosalinda (1945)
- Pasiones Tormentosas (1946)
- The Queen of the Tropics (1946)
- Caribbean Enchantment (1947)
- The Private Life of Mark Antony and Cleopatra (1947)
- La sin ventura (1947)
- La insaciable (1947)
- Ángel o demonio (1947)
- The Well-paid (1948)
- Nuestras vidas (1948)
- La hija del penal (1948)
- Flor de caña (1948)
- The Woman of the Port (1949)
- Un cuerpo de mujer (1949)
- Piña madura (1950)
- El ciclón del Caribe (1950)
- La reina del mambo (1950)
- María Cristina (1950)
- La niña popoff (1951)
- Carnaval en la Atlántida (1952)
- Me lo dijo Adela (1953)
- Casa de perdición (1954)
- La gaviota (1954)
- ¡Que bravas son las costeñas! (1955)
- La engañadora (1955)
- La culpa de los hombres (1956)
- Teatro del crimen (1956)
- Nunca me hagan eso (1956)
- La odalisca no. 13 (1957)
- La Odalisca No. 13 (1957)
- Ferias de México (1957)
- A Thousand and One Nights (1958)
- It Happened in Mexico (1958)
- Los legionarios (1958)
- La flor de la canela (1959)
- Acapulqueña (1959)
- Una estrella y dos estrellados (1960)
- Las cuatro milpas (1960)
- Voy de gallo (1961)
- El centauro del norte (1961)
- Romance in Puerto Rico (1962)
- Caña Brava (1964)

== Bibliography ==
- Muñoz Castillo, Fernando (1993). Las Reinas del Tropico: María Antonieta Pons, Meche Barba, Amalia Aguilar, Ninón Sevilla & Rosa Carmina. Grupo Azabache. ISBN 968-6084-85-1.
- Las Rumberas del Cine Mexicano (The Rumberas of the Mexican Cinema) (1999). In SOMOS. México: Editorial Televisa, S. A. de C. V.
- Agrasánchez Jr., Rogelio (2001). Bellezas del cine mexicano/Beauties of Mexican Cinema. Archivo Fílmico Agrasánchez. ISBN 968-5077-11-8.
