= Florencio Castelló =

Spanish actor (1905–1986)

- Born: 1905; Seville, Andalusia, Spain
- Died: 23 August 1986 (aged 80–81); Mexico City, Mexico
- Occupations: Film, television and voice actor
- Years active: 1941–1986 (film)

Florencio Castelló (1905 – 23 August 1986) was a Spanish actor, known for participating in the Golden Age of Mexican cinema, acting alongside personalities of Mexican cinema such as Pedro Infante and Cantinflas. He usually played roles of a Spaniard with an Andalusian accent.

He left Spain in 1936 fleeing the civil war in his country, joining a theater company in which he performed Andalusian works, which toured throughout Latin America until in 1939 he arrived in Mexico.

He also served as a voice actor, being known for voicing Mr. Jinks in the Latin American Spanish dub (done in Mexico) of the Hanna-Barbera cartoon series Pixie and Dixie and Mr. Jinks, also using his Andalusian accent.

== Selected filmography ==
- Neither Blood nor Sand (1941)
- Dos mexicanos en Sevilla (1942)
- Simón Bolívar (1942)
- El verdugo de Sevilla (1942)
- ¡Así se quiere en Jalisco! (1942)
- Santa (1943)
- Escándalo de estrellas (1944)
- Cruel Destiny (1944)
- Ecija's Seven Children (1947)
- Chachita from Triana (1947)
- The Secret of Juan Palomo (1947)
- Gangsters Versus Cowboys (1948)
- Aunt Candela (1948)
- Lost (1950)
- A Gypsy in Havana (1950)
- Orange Blossom for Your Wedding (1950)
- También de dolor se canta (1950)
- Port of Temptation (1951)
- Canasta uruguaya (1951)
- Las locuras de Tin-Tan (1952)
- Here Comes Martin Corona (1952)
- El Enamorado (1952)
- Sombrero (1953)
- You Had To Be a Gypsy (1953)
- Camelia (1954)
- Tú y las nubes (1955)
- Barefoot Sultan (1956)
- A sablazo limpio (1958)
- Dos corazones y un cielo (1959)
- The Miracle Roses (1960)
- The Black Bull (1960)
- Adventures of Joselito and Tom Thumb (1960)
- Vacations in Acapulco (1961)
- The White Horse (1962)
- The Exterminating Angel (1962)
- El padrecito (1964)
- La casa de las muchachas (1969)
- The Holy Office (1974)
- The Bricklayer (1975)
