= Cihuateteo =

Aztec mythology spirits

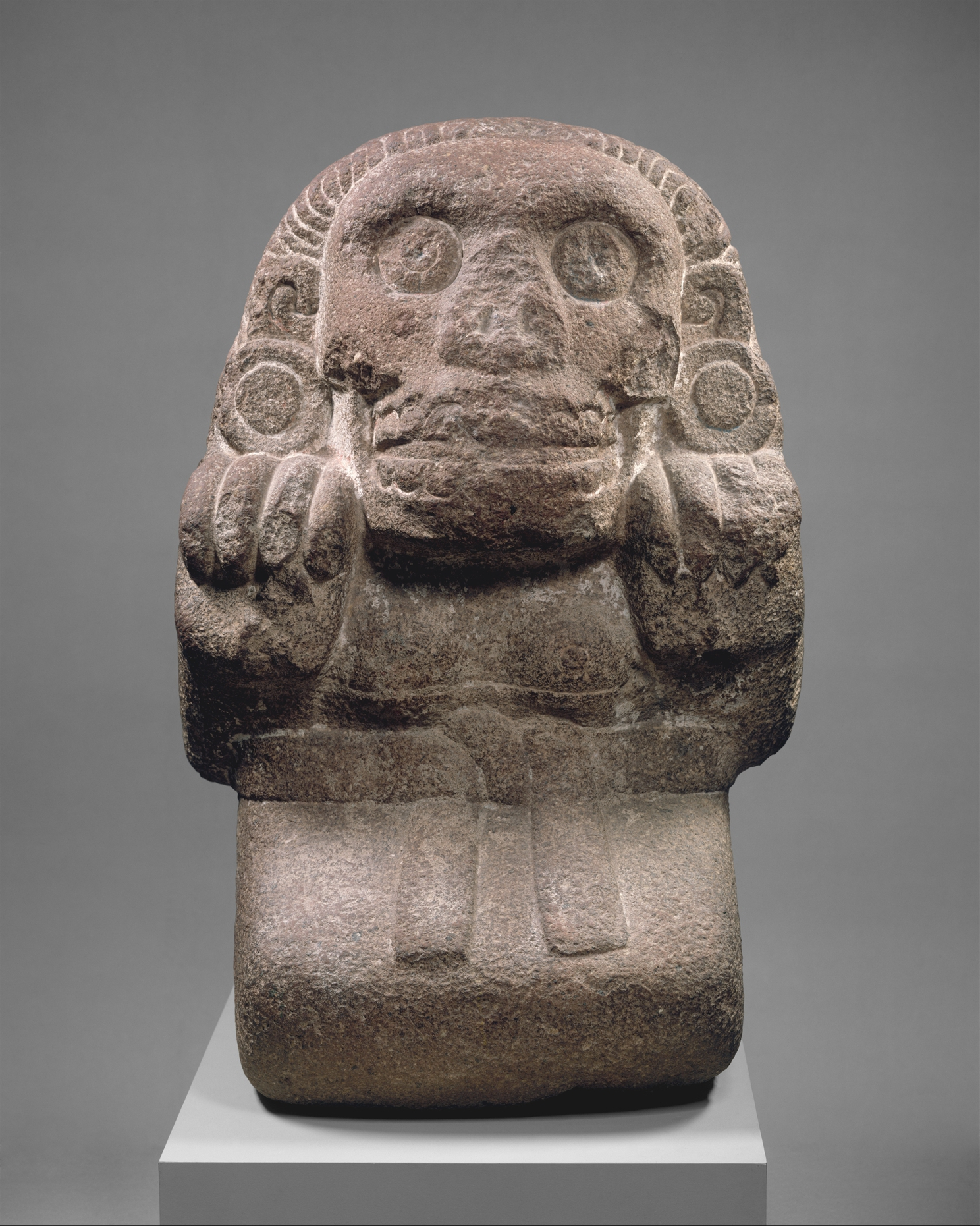
A figure of a cihuateotl, the spirit of an Aztec woman who died in childbirth.

In Aztec mythology, the Cihuateteo (/siːˌwɑːtɪˈteɪoʊ/; Classical Nahuatl: Cihuātēteoh, in singular Cihuātēotl) or "Divine Women", were the spirits of women who died in childbirth. They were likened to the spirits of male warriors who died in violent conflict, because childbirth was conceptually equivalent to battle in Aztec culture. According to tradition, a woman in labor was said to capture the spirit of her newborn child similar to the way a warrior captures his opponent in battle. These spirits are also associated with the west, the place where the sun sets each day.

== Mythology ==
The Cihuateteo resided in a region in the west known as Cihuatlampa, the “place of women.” Each day, they guided the sun into the west from noon until sunset, and are occasionally suggested to have even borne it through the underworld until it rose again. They were aided by the spirits of male warriors, and this practice of guiding the sun was seen as exclusive to these two groups of the deceased—it was an honor that was not bestowed on any other individuals.

On five specific days in the Aztec calendar, the cihuateteo descended to the earth: 1 Deer, 1 Rain, 1 Monkey, 1 House, and 1 Eagle. While on earth, they were considered to be demons of the night, and often haunted crossroads. Roadside shrines were often erected to appease them, as they were believed to steal children, cause madness and seizures, and induce men to adultery. The figure of a cihuateotl from the Metropolitan Museum of Art has been inscribed on top of her head with the name Ce Calli, “1 House,” while the figure from the British Museum is inscribed with the glyph “1 Monkey”—these indicate their respective days of descent.

== Funerary practices ==
When an Aztec woman experienced childbirth, it was seen as a violent and laborious effort likened to the intensity of battle. It was believed that the child was sent down to the earth by the gods, and the woman had to fight and struggle in order to bring it into the world. The newborn child was seen as a sufficient reward if she was successful and emerged victorious from her “fight” with the gods, but if she lost and proved unsuccessful, then she died and her soul underwent transformation into a cihuateotl.

In the case of the death of the woman, special funerary practices were carried out, as the body of a woman who had died in childbirth was believed to possess special powers and magic following the departure of the soul from the body. In these special practices, the body was guarded fiercely by an armed entourage that included the widowed husband, his friends, all the midwives, and old women. This was deemed necessary due to the need to protect the woman's human remains from male warriors. Parts of the body believed to be especially potent relics for warriors were the left middle finger and the hair. According to Aztec belief, “these relics had magical power and, if placed on their shields, would make the warriors brave and valiant, give them strength, and blind the eyes of their enemies.”

== Depictions in art ==
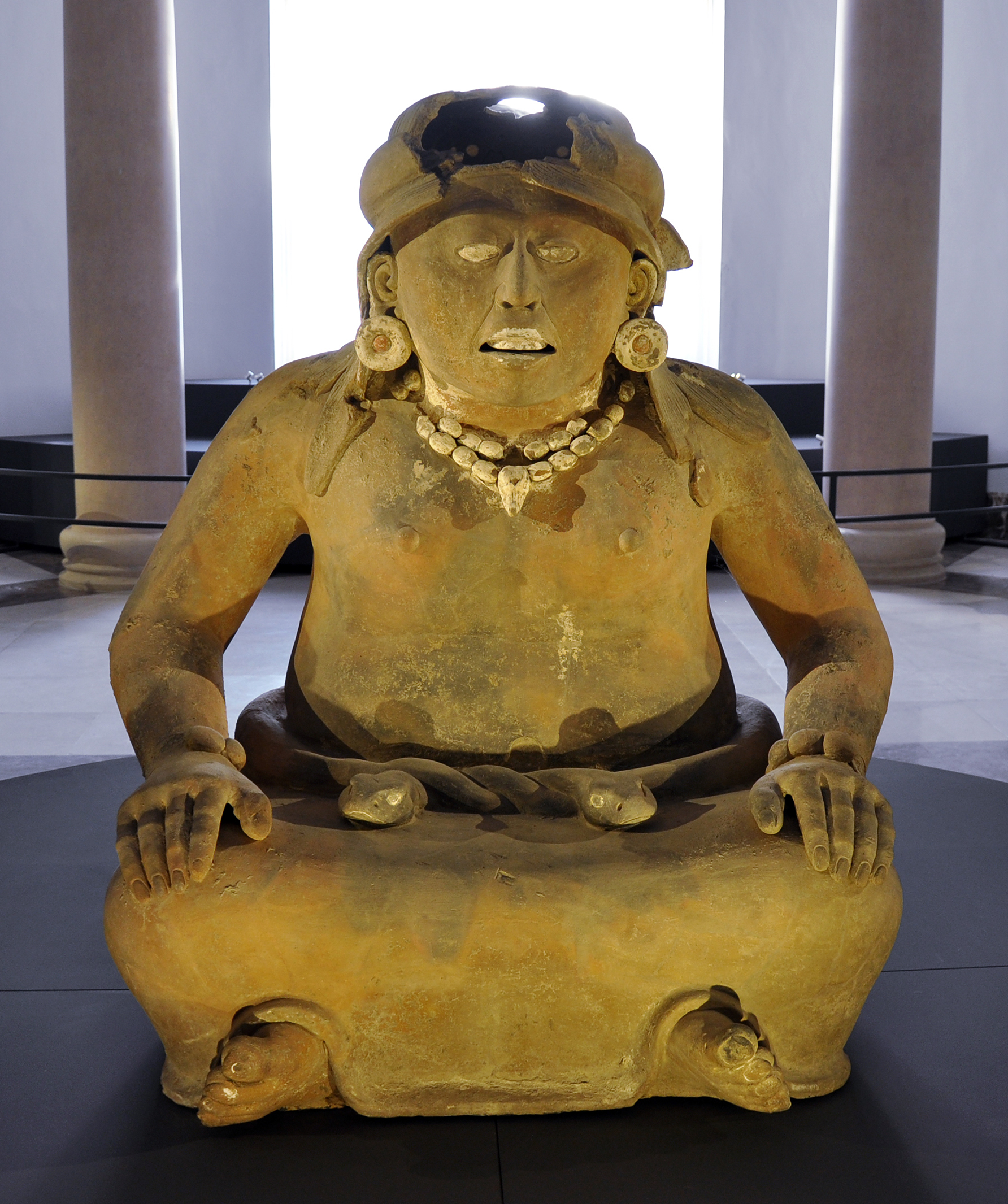
A terracotta statue depicting an El Zapotal cihuateotl.

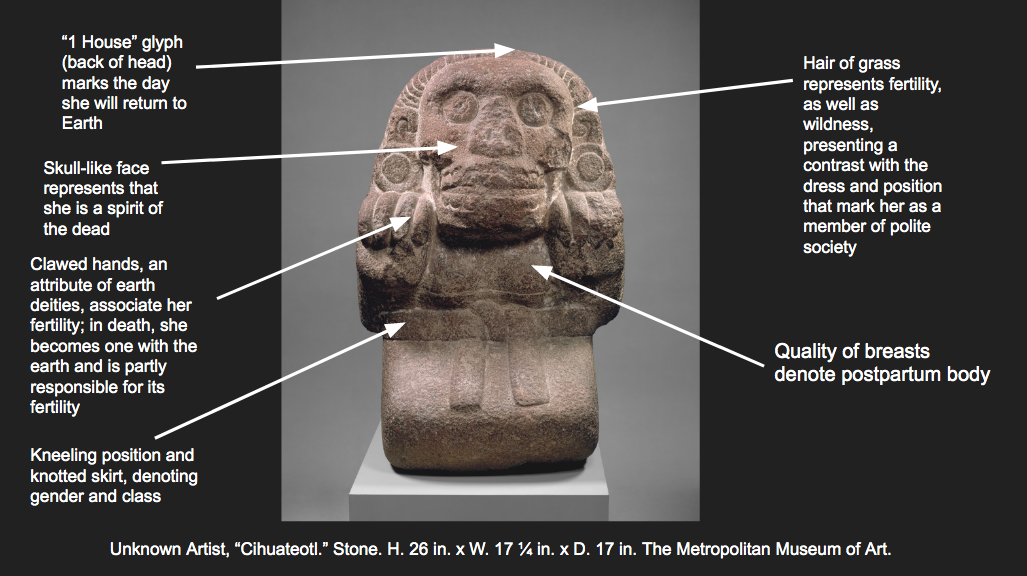
Cihuateotl sculpture with significant features annotated.

Cihuateteo can be characterized as “fearsome figures with clenched, claw-like fists, macabre, bared teeth and gums and aggressive poses.” Sitting with their clawed feet tucked beneath their skirts, they seem at once in repose and ready to attack. In Aztec art, the postpartum female body is often depicted with pendulous breasts and stomach folds. Within Aztec artistic tradition, cihuateteo are commonly depicted with taut stomachs, exposed breasts, and prominent nipples. These are all features that serve to highlight their unrealized potential as mothers, as these women died before having the opportunity to bear and nurse their newborn child.

Oftentimes, cihuateteo are also depicted with swirling, unkempt orange hair and skirts fastened with snake belts. Cihuateteo figures found at the site of El Zapotal even carry staffs bearing heads as trophies, and seem to be covered with flayed skins, which suggests deference or worship to a female vegetation deity. The serpent around the waist may be a reference to the serpentine goddess Cihuacoatl, who was not only associated with war, sacrifice, and political power, but also with fertility, childbirth, and midwifery. Finally, the unkempt hair is often associated with darkness and the earth. Not only was Cihuatlampa a place of darkness, but most Aztec associations with the earth (and particularly earth goddesses) symbolize both childbirth and sacrifice, two of the defining traits of the cihuateteo themselves.

== See also ==
- La Llorona
- Soldaderas
