= Mission to the North of Seoul =

1953 film

- Directed by: Juan José Martínez Casado
- Written by: René García Díaz
- Produced by: Cristóbal Viera Catasús
- Starring: Rafael Bertrand; Emilita Dago; Paquita de Ronda
- Cinematography: M. Rojas Carvajal
- Edited by: Enrique Bravo; Rosalina Saavedra
- Music by: Obdulio Morales
- Production company: Habana Filmica
- Release date: 1953
- Running time: 72 minutes
- Country: Mexico
- Language: Spanish

Mission to the North of Seoul (Spanish: Misión al norte de Seul) is a 1953 Cuban war drama film directed by Juan José Martínez Casado and starring Rafael Bertrand, Emilita Dago and Paquita de Ronda. It was made with the backing of the government of Fulgencio Batista.

== Synopsis ==
A Cuban living in New York City falls in love with a Cuban singer and dancer but she is married to another man. When he enlists in the American Army he discovers that his comrade is the lady's husband.

== Selected cast ==
- Rafael Bertrand as Clark Brown
- Emilita Dago
- Leo Marini as Self
- Irigoyen Perucho
- Paquita de Ronda as Self

== Bibliography ==
- Noguer, Eduardo G. Historia del cine cubano: cien años, 1897–1998. Ediciones Universal, 2002.
- Osuna, Alfonso J. García. The Cuban Filmography: 1897 through 2001. McFarland, 2003.
