= La Llorona =

Vengeful ghost in Latin American folklore

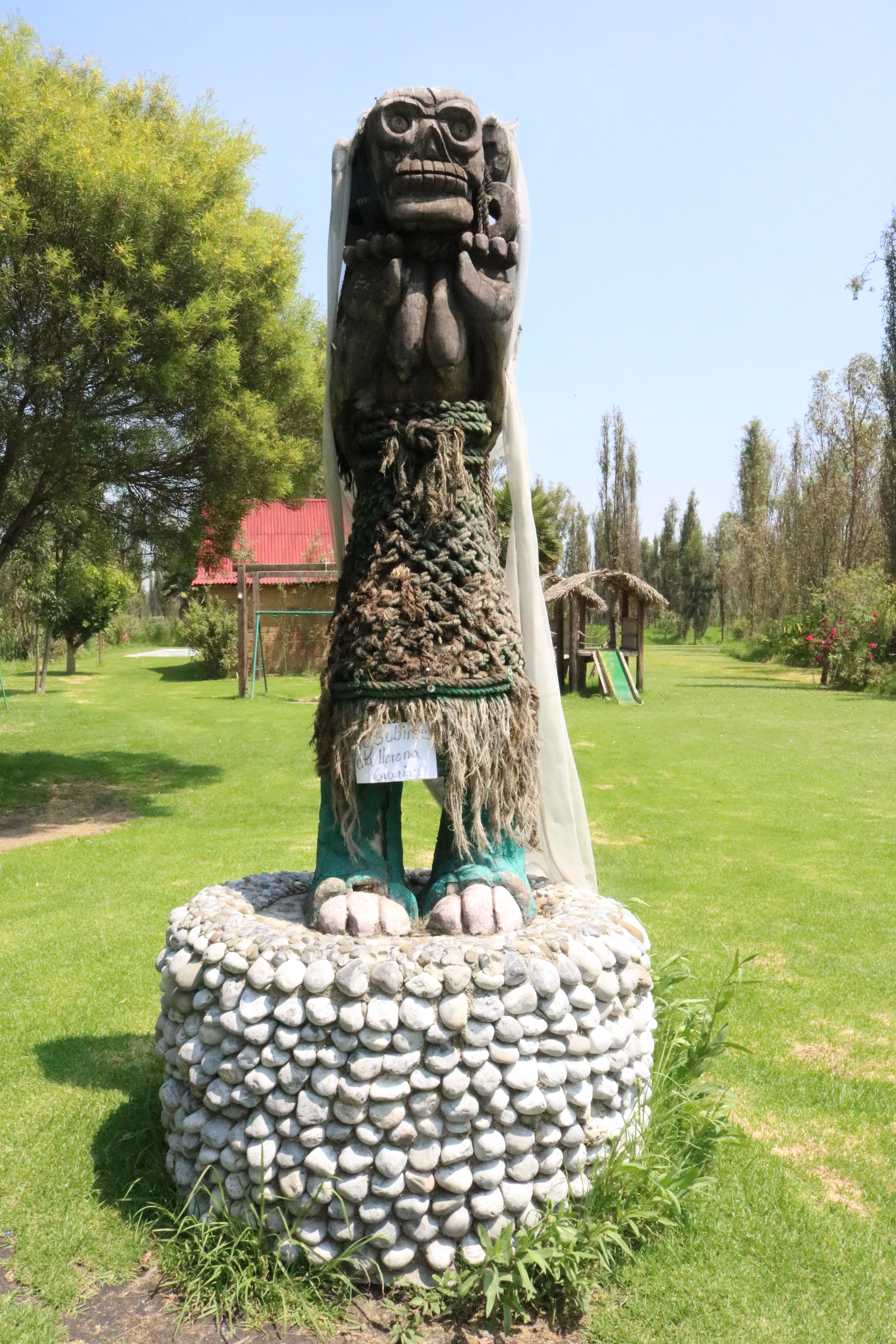
Statue of La Llorona on an island of Xochimilco, Mexico, 2015

La Llorona (Latin American Spanish: [la ʝoˈɾona]; 'the Crying Woman, the Weeping Woman, the Wailer') is a vengeful ghost in Hispanic American folklore who is said to roam near bodies of water mourning her children she drowned in the river. Whoever hears her crying is said to either suffer misfortune, death, or become extremely unsuccessful in life.

The lore of La Llorona is well known in Mexico and the southwestern United States. Her legend is traditionally told throughout Mexico, Central America and northern South America. La Llorona is sometimes conflated with La Malinche, the Nahua woman who served as Hernán Cortés's interpreter and also bore his son. La Malinche is considered both the mother of the modern Mexican people and a symbol of national treachery for her role in aiding the Spanish.

== Origins ==
The presence of ghostly beings who desperately cry by rivers for various reasons is a recurring feature of the mythology of Mesoamerican peoples. Thus, traits of these specters can be found in several pre-Columbian cultures, which eventually, with the arrival of the Spanish conquistadors, came to share common characteristics due to the expansion of Spanish dominion over the continent. The legend is a story that has mythical referents in the pre-Hispanic universe, but that establishes its drama and its imaginary, anguishing retinue in the colonial order.

To explain the origin of the legend of La Llorona, three main approaches have been proposed: a literalist approach, meaning that the events really happened—a Spaniard killed his indigenous-Spaniard children he had with the woman people blame for her children’s death, and from there the story was told again and again until the woman became a ghost and the story a legend; a euhemerist approach, in which a myth is superimposed on a real story with concrete referents (as, for example, when the myth of the goddess Cihuacóatl is superimposed on the story of La Malinche); and finally, a parabolic approach, which has an apologetic and symbolic reading, with a hidden meaning, in which the story emerges as a way of giving voice to silenced groups—in this case, Indigenous peoples during the Conquest and colonization.

=== Pre-Columbian legends ===
For the ancestral cultures of the Americas, myths answer questions about the origin of man and the universe. These myths were carried by the Indigenous societies of the Americas in their migrations, being transmitted orally through many generations. Myths are traditionally linked to religion and worship. Their characters are divine beings, both worshipped and feared, whose powers transcend human intellect. Whether the myth is of Quechua, Nahuatl, Guaraní, or Aymara inspiration, its essence lies in the need of the human spirit to unravel the wonders and mysteries that surround and terrify it. The legend of La Llorona is, above all, a story created to warn and frighten.

==== Mesoamerican myths ====
In Mexico, where it originated in Xochimilco and the Lacandon jungle, several researchers estimate that La Llorona, as a character of mythology and legend, has its origin in certain pre-Hispanic beings or deities such as Auicanime, among the Purépechas; Xonaxi Queculla, among the Zapotecs; Cihuacóatl, among the Nahuas; and the Xtabay, among the Lacandon Maya. She is always identified with the underworld, hunger, death, sin, and lust. In the case of Xtabay (or Xtabal), this Lacandon goddess is identified as an evil spirit in the form of a beautiful woman whose back has the shape of a hollow tree. By inducing men to embrace her, she drives them mad and kills them. The Zapotec goddess Xonaxi Queculla, meanwhile, is a deity of death, the underworld and lust who appears in some representations with emaciated arms. Attractive at first sight, she appears to men, makes them fall in love and seduces them, only to later transform into a skeleton and carry the spirit of her victims to the underworld. Auicanime was considered among the Purépechas to be the goddess of hunger (her name can be translated as the Thirsty One or the Needy One). She was also the goddess of women who died in childbirth during their first delivery, who, according to belief, became warriors (mocihuaquetzaque), which turned them into divinities and, therefore, into objects of worship and offering. This abundance of goddesses connected with phallic cults and sexual life was the origin not only of La Llorona, but also of other female ghosts that punish men, such as the Siguanaba, the Cegua or the Sucia.

===== Cihuacóatl and other Mexica entities =====
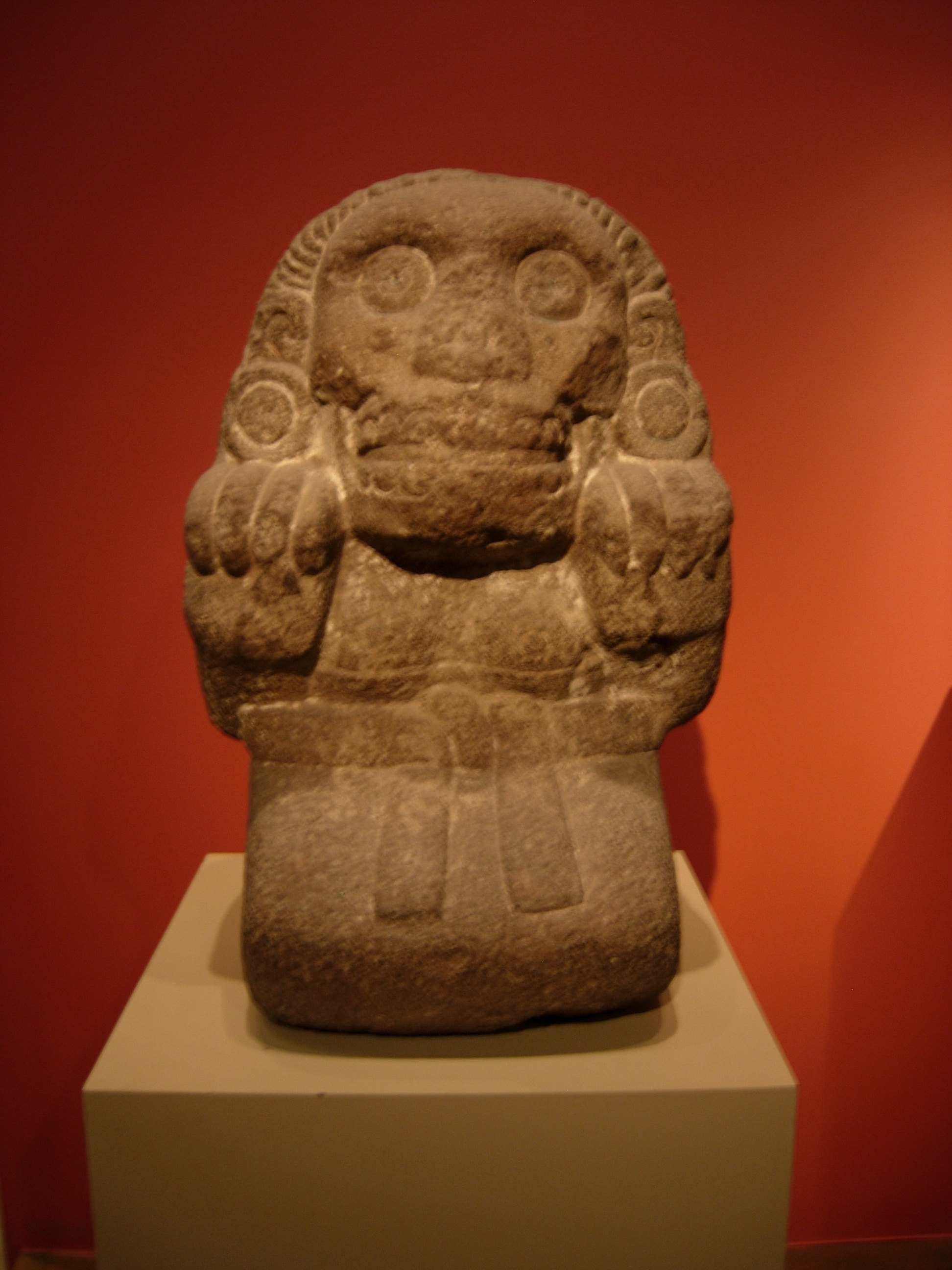
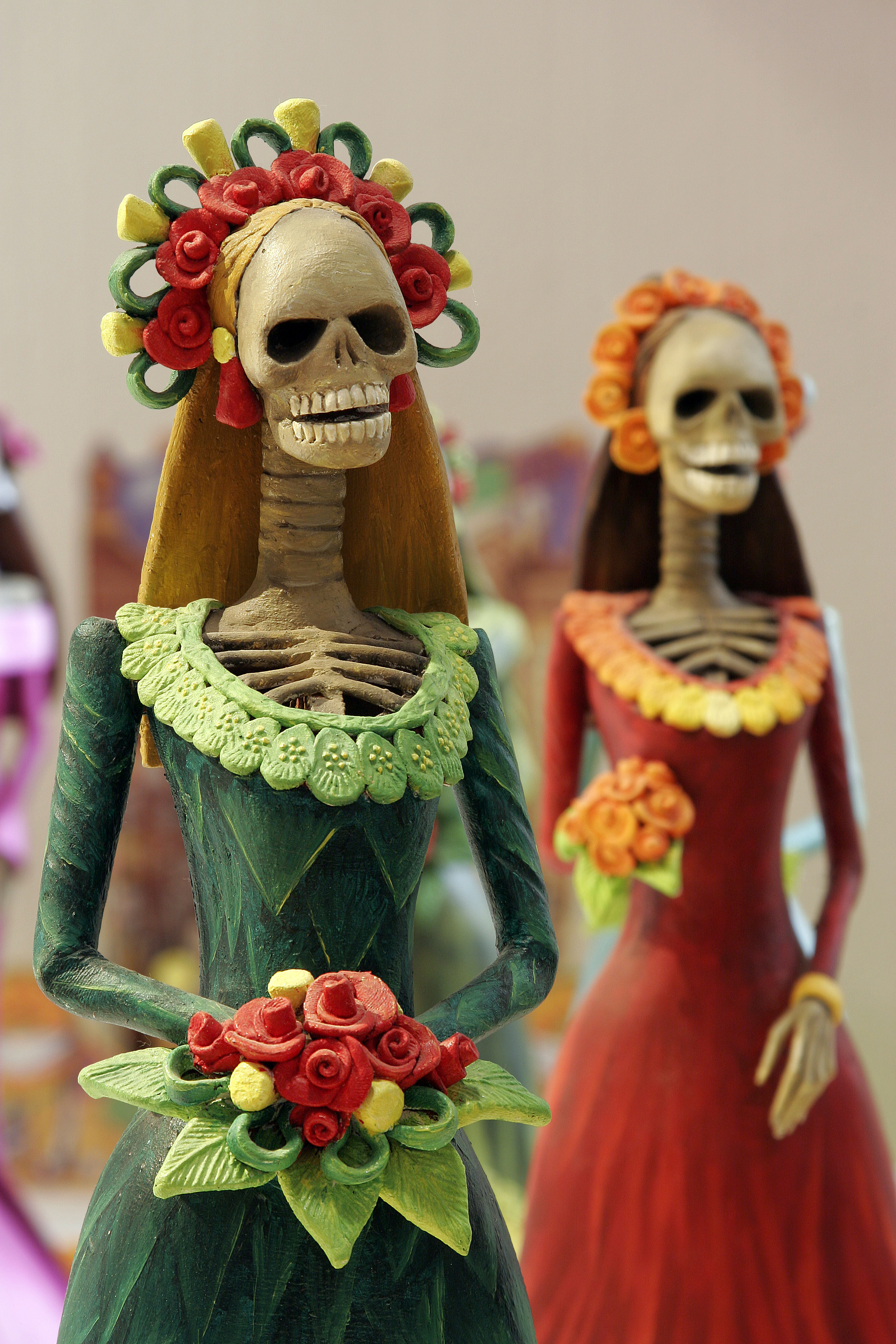
La Catrina (right) is the emblem of the traditional Mexican Day of the Dead. Its skeletal figure and skull-like face recalls the forms of the Aztec cihuateteo (left), female spirits of women who die in childbirth, of whom Chocacíhuatl (La Llorona) is the first of all.

In the particular case of the Mexica, the pre-Hispanic legend of La Llorona arises from a multitude of hybrid oral narratives. La Llorona has been associated with the pre-Hispanic goddess Tenpecutli, who purged a sorrow for having drowned her children in a river. This goddess, who was very beautiful, had the ability to change her face into that of an animal if someone looked into her eyes, like the nahuales. Another figure with whom she has been associated was the goddess of the underworld Mictlancíhuatl, who seduced and ruined men. It has also been proposed that La Llorona is a hybridization of three Mexica goddesses: Cihuacóatl (the mother goddess and serpent woman), Teoyaominqui (the watcher of the dead), and Quilaztli (goddess of childbirth and twins). For the Mexica, this trio of goddesses wandered in the figure of a woman dressed in white who cried for her lost children, and hearing her was an ill omen.

One of the best-known pre-Hispanic antecedents of the legend of La Llorona is the one that identifies her with the Mexica goddess Cihuacóatl. This goddess has different attributes: goddess of the earth (Coatlicue), fertility and childbirth (Quilaztli), warrior woman (Yaocíhuatl), and mother (Tonantzin), both of the Mexica and of their very gods (she was the mother of Huitzilopochtli, the greatest Mexica god). Cihuacóatl was also the patron of the cihuateteo, spirits of women who died in childbirth who at night cried out and roared in the air, who descended to the earth on certain days dedicated to them in the calendar in order to frighten at crossroads and who were fatal for children. One of these cihuateteo could be heard at night, uttering great laments over the death of her son and the loss of her own life. She was called Chocacíhuatl—from Nahuatl choka, 'to cry', and cihuatl, 'woman'. She was the first of all mothers who died in childbirth. There floated in the air the stripped skulls separated from their bodies (Chocacíhuatl and her child), hunting any traveler who had been caught by the darkness of night. If any mortal saw these things, it was a sure omen of misfortune or even death. This entity was one of the most feared in the Nahua world from before the arrival of the Spaniards.

On her story being connected to specific Aztec mythological creation stories. "The Hungry Woman" includes a wailing woman constantly crying for food, which has been compared to La Llorona's signature nocturnal wailing for her children.

==== Spirits, ghosts, and weeping women of the Intermediate Area ====
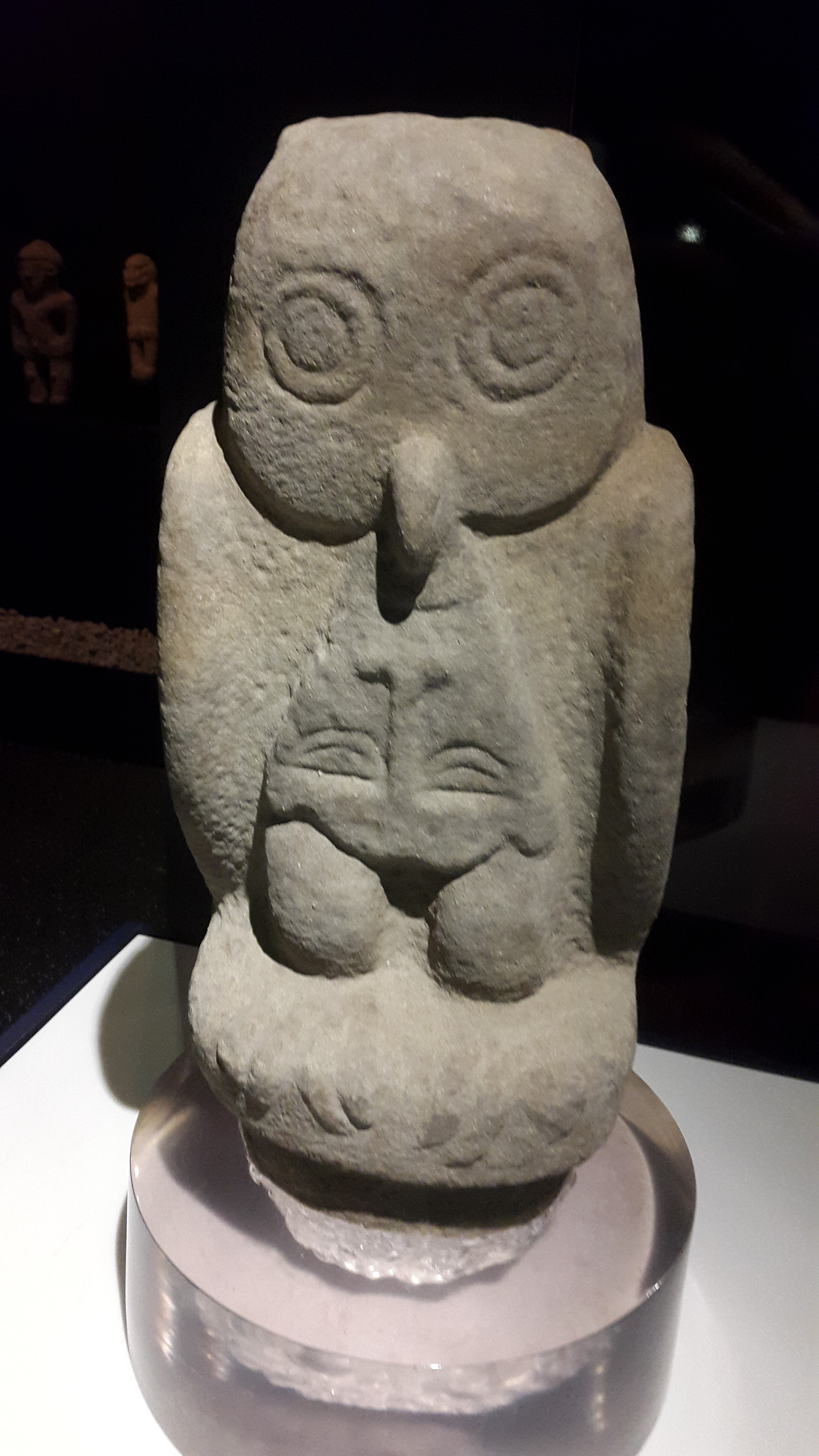
In Talamancan mythology, the owl, lady of the night, is related to the myth of Wíkela, the Tulevieja, the weeping woman of Bribri legend (Note: For the Talamancan peoples, the owl arose when Sibú, the supreme god, killed Wíkela, who wanted to eat the Indigenous people, by cooking her in a clay pot. When she died, her right eye burst and became an owl, whose hoot recalls the crying of a woman.)

In the Bribri and Cabécar Talamancan mythology, located on the border between Costa Rica and Panama, the stories of these spirits are transmitted through the Suwoh, the oral tradition of these peoples. In their myths, these spirits, called itsö, are beings associated with dark and tangled mountains, mountain abysses, rains, strong winds, and river waterfalls, with a strong connection to the forces of nature and rural life. They are creatures with the appearance of a woman and the body of a bird that dwell in caves and riverbeds, and that utter mournful cries when a child is about to die, or else lose children in the forest when they stray from their parents. Examples of these myths are the stories of Sakabiali and the Wíkela. (Note: In Talamancan mythology, Itsa' was the name given to one of the principal devils, and at the same time it is the generic name given to all evil beings. This demon was cannibalistic, and its purpose was to devour the Indigenous people. In Bribri traditions it has different manifestations. One of them is Wíkela, a hideous old woman with bird-like attributes, who pursued children in order to eat them. This being is the origin of the legend of the Tulevieja. The Talamancan peoples believed that tuleviejas lived in caves behind waterfalls, and that they cried when a child was going to die, or else led them astray in order to devour them. One of these tuleviejas was Sakabiali, a mountain weeping woman who ate Lady Ágata, wife of the god Talá Yakela, the thunder, and mother of the hurricane children.) In the Bribri language, the word itsö means both "weeping woman" and "tulevieja". Hence there are similarities between the legends told in Costa Rica and Panama for these two ghosts (basically a woman who kills her child, the result of an unwanted pregnancy, and who is therefore condemned to wander as a ghost).

The Indigenous peoples of Colombia and Venezuela also have many myths about female divinities associated with rivers and nature, such as the Madremonte in Colombia and María Lionza in Venezuela. These are protective deities of forests, animals, and water sources, with powers over natural phenomena. In Colombian legends, for example, the Madremonte appears during stormy nights and tempests, uttering roars and infernal screams that shake the mountain. In the case of María Lionza, many of her origin myths have to do with water, and, like the Madremonte, she is protector of fish and nature.

==== Amazonian and Andean legends ====
In South America there are some pre-Columbian legends that came to be associated with that of La Llorona once Hispanic dominion was established over the continent, but which do not have a common origin with it, although there are very similar aspects. Similar traces can be found in the legend of the Ayaymama of Peruvian Amazonian mythology. In this legend, a mother abandons her two children in a river because she feels that she is going to die of an illness and wants to avoid them dying because of her. The children end up transformed into birds that emit a mournful sound. In the Guaraní legends of Paraguay, Uruguay, and Argentina, the myth of La Llorona is related to the urutaú (Nyctibius griseus), also called güemí-cué, a nocturnal bird that emits sounds similar to a weeping woman.

===== Pucullén =====
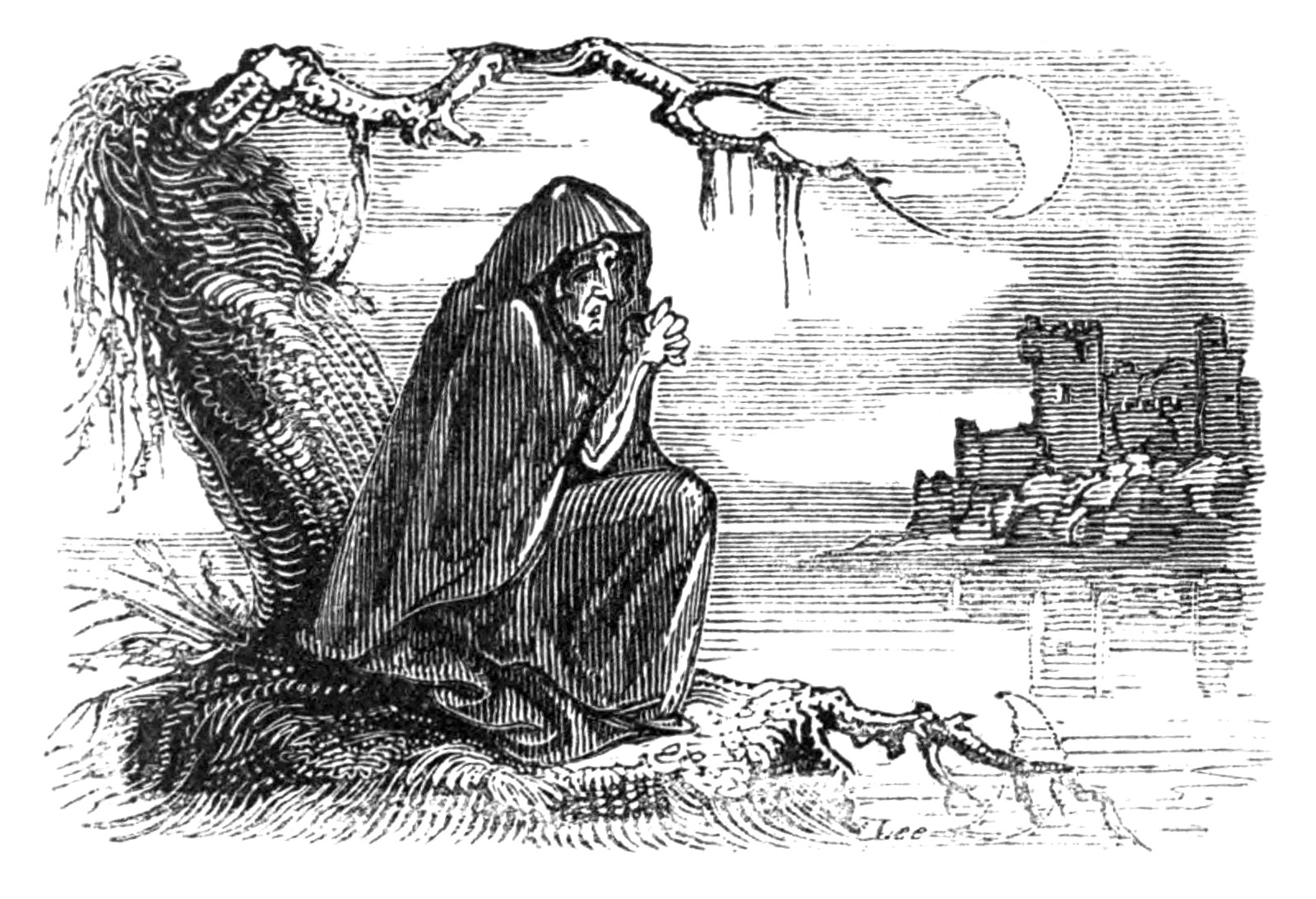
In Chiloé, Pucullén is a tall, thin woman, dressed in black, whose crying announces the death of some person

Prominent among these legends is the story of Pucullén (from Mapudungun külleñu, 'tears', and pu, a plural prefix), belonging to the folklore of the Mapuches of Chile. Pucullén weeps eternally because her child was taken from her arms at a very early age, or because one of her children died in her arms. She is a ghostly presence dressed in white (black in some versions), whom only people close to death, some people with special abilities (such as machis or calcus), children, and animals with sharper senses can see, among them dogs, which utter mournful howls when they perceive her presence, therefore, if one rubs one's eyes with dog tears, she may be seen; but if the observer's heart is not firm, her image will be terrifying. Pucullén fulfills the characteristics of a psychopomp, that is, a guide of the dead, who indicates by her steps and cries the path that the dead must travel in order to move from their earthly dwelling to the beyond. With her abundant tears, which form a crystal-clear pool, Pucullén marks the exact place in the cemetery where the grave must be opened to place the coffin. She weeps as a mourner for all the dead person's relatives, so that they may soon be consoled for the loss; moreover, she prevents the spirit of the dead person, displeased with the few tears and signs of grief of his relatives, from returning to torment them. She is also an omen of death, so only a person who is about to die can see her.

=== Europe ===
Stories of weeping female phantoms are common in the folklore of both Iberian and Amerindian cultures. Scholars have pointed out similarities between La Llorona and the Cihuacōātl of Aztec mythology, as well as Eve and Lilith of Hebrew mythology. Author Ben Radford's investigation into the legend of La Llorona, published in Mysterious New Mexico, found common elements of the story in the German folktale "Die Weiße Frau" dating from 1486. La Llorona also bears a resemblance to the ancient Greek tale of the demigoddess Lamia, in which Hera, Zeus's wife, learned of his affair with Lamia and killed all the children Lamia had with Zeus. Out of jealousy over the loss of her own children, Lamia kills other women's children.

The Greek legend of Jason and Medea also features the motif of a woman who murders her children as an act of revenge against her husband, who has left her.

==== Spain ====
The tales of La Llorona are seen differently in Spain, as detailed in Elvira, La Llorona published by José Maria León y Domínguez, a Jesuit academic from Cadiz. The tale begins with a woman named Elvira who experiences a devastating life which slowly led to her transformation into the spectral figure La Llorona.

==== Other mythologies ====
In Eastern Europe, the modern Rusalka is a type of water spirit in Slavic mythology. They come to be after a woman drowns due to suicide or murder, especially if they had an unwanted pregnancy. Then they must stay in this world for a period of time.

=== First documentation of the legend: the sixth omen ===
The Florentine Codex is an important text about the Spanish invasion of Mexico in 1519. It includes a series of bad omens registered a decade before of the Spaniard’s arrival. "The sixth omen was that many times a woman would be heard going along weeping and shouting. She cried out loudly at night, saying, 'Oh my children, we are about to go forever.' Sometimes she said, 'Oh my children, where am I to take you?'"

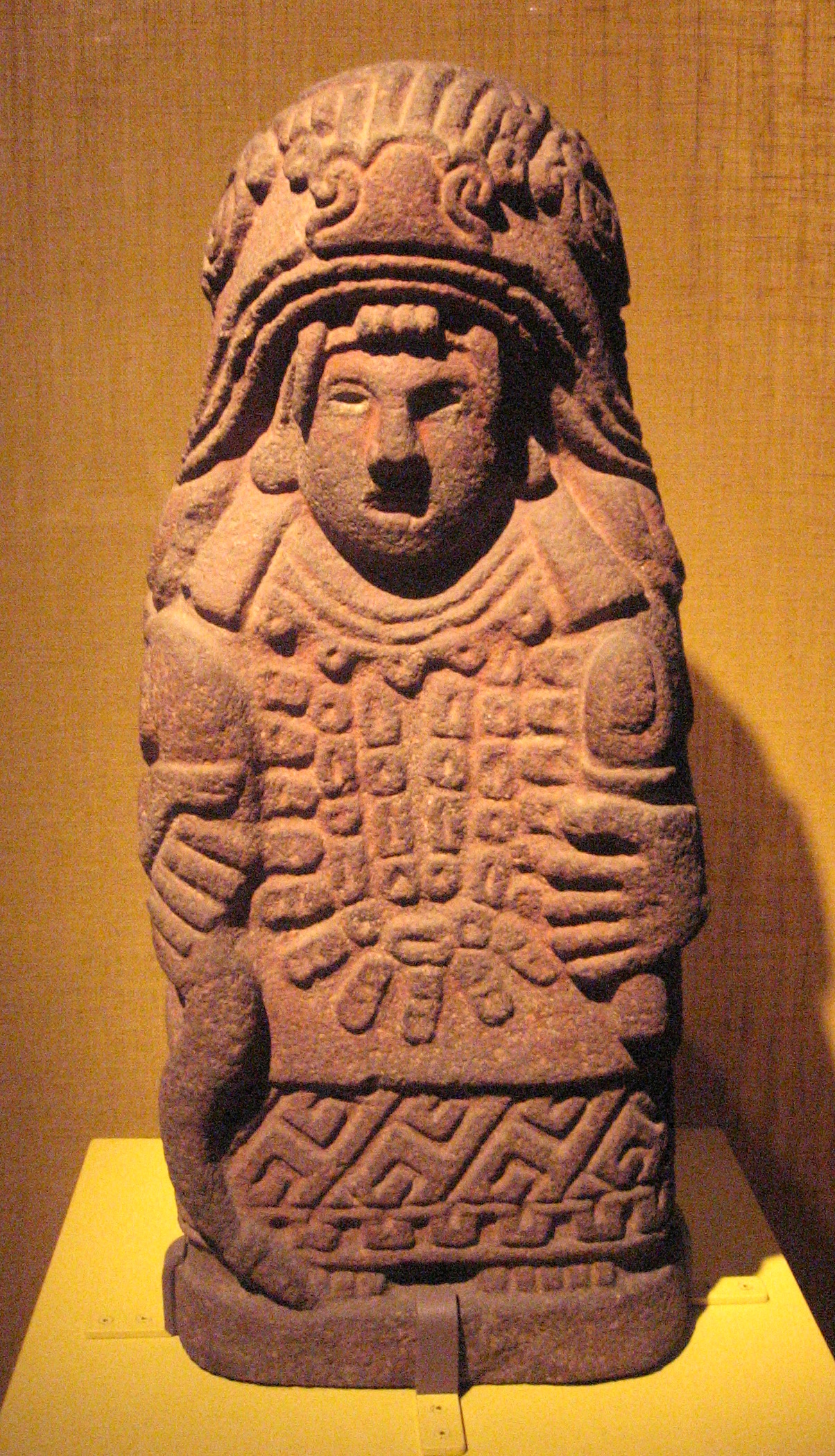
The Mexica goddess Cihuacóatl

The legend of La Llorona was documented around 1550, when Friar Bernardino de Sahagún recorded the legend of Chocacíhuatl in his monumental work Historia general de las cosas de Nueva España (1540–1585) and identified this figure with the goddess Cihuacóatl.

...she appeared many times as a lady dressed with garments such as are used in the palace; they also said that at night she cried out and roared in the air... The garments with which this woman appeared were white, and she dressed her hair in such a way that it had little crossed horns over the forehead.
Bernardino de Sahagún.
Historia (book I, ch. VI).

According to the Codex Aubin, Cihuacóatl was one of the two deities that accompanied the Mexica during their pilgrimage in search of Aztlán. According to the dual conception of Mesoamerican deities, Cihuacóatl is at once the goddess who gives life and death, capable of creating and destroying her children. She is at once a nurturing and destructive mother. According to the legend, before the arrival of the Spanish conquerors in Mexico, a series of omens foretold the fall of the Mexica Empire at the hands of men coming from the east. One of these omens was the appearance of the goddess Cihuacóatl in the form of a woman dressed in a flowing white gown, (Note: The color white is characteristic of all manifestations of Cihuacóatl and refers to destiny, to the goddess's rattle of mist, to the bones of men, to the cihuateteo painted white, and to the white earth of Aztlán.) with long black hair loose, materializing over the waters of Lake Texcoco, (Note: Water is the feminine and maternal element par excellence: the source of purification, but also where sorrow is infinite. Water is also death; in this case, the death of the mother by her own hand, a kind of suicide or immolation in the face of the inevitable. It is the road to the path of the end. La Llorona appears wherever there is water because thus her sorrow is greater, continuous. The currents of a river will never be the same; she will never reach her destination, never again hold the past in her hands, always pursuing different waters, unfathomable, eternal, impossible to grasp. Both Aztlán, the mythical homeland of the Mexica, and Tenochtitlan were surrounded by it, linking both places through not only physical but also mythical coincidences.) and wandering among the lakes and temples of the Anáhuac, she wept and lamented, crying out, "Ay mis hijos, ¿dónde los llevaré para que escapen de tan funesto destino?" ("Oh my children, where shall I take you so that you may escape such a dreadful fate?"), terrifying the inhabitants of Tenochtitlan, After the Conquest of Mexico, during the Colonial era, inhabitants reported the appearance of the wandering ghost of a woman dressed in white who roamed the streets of Mexico City uttering sad wails, (Note: Note that La Llorona's weeping changes after the Conquest is consummated: whereas in the period before the fall of Tenochtitlan the ghost asks what will become of her children (thus somehow harboring some hope of saving them), during the Colonial period she limits herself to an "¡Ay, mis hijos!", denoting a consummated fact and the loss of hope. This exclamation of pain is a sign of immediate destruction. The death of the children symbolizes the destruction of Mexica civilization.) passing through the Main Plaza (former site of the destroyed temple of Huitzilopochtli, the greatest Aztec god and son of Cihuacóatl), where she looked toward the east, (Note: The reference to the east is important in Mesoamerican cosmogony. The east is charged with meanings: it is the direction where the Sun rises. It is related to the color red. There were the paradise of the Sun and the Tlalocan. The Tlillan Tlapallan, "where black and red are", the mythical place to which Quetzalcoatl departed. It has been interpreted as a region of wisdom, charged with esoteric symbolism, and the Nahuas place it to the east, beyond the sea. For the Tarascans, in that direction lay the road to the underworld. From the east, too, came the conquerors.) and then continued to Lake Texcoco, (Note: During the omens foretelling the end of the Aztec empire, Lake Texcoco (also Meztliapan, the lake of the Moon—one of Cihuacóatl's manifestations is Coatlicue, mother of the Sun, Moon, and stars) played a major role in the fifth and seventh prodigies, first because it boiled in fury and destroyed houses, and then because they caught there a bird that showed the fate awaiting the Mexica.) where she vanished among the shadows.

Fray Bernardino attributes the legend to the Mexica people, in present-day Mexico.

=== The legend during the Viceroyal period ===
The legend of La Llorona took shape during the Viceroyal period, for to the pre-Hispanic antecedents was added the Spanish contribution that established the myth as such, turning La Llorona into one of the first signs of mestizaje. The multiplicity of origins and versions of the same story is a very clear sign that it is the product of syncretism. Due to the nature of oral traditions and folklore, it is possible that the native legend of La Llorona passed from Indigenous people to the Spaniards, who added their own elements according to their myths, and that afterward the legend, now with Spanish elements, passed again to Indigenous peoples, who once more incorporated their own elements. This process could also have occurred in reverse.

In Spanish folklore, the white lady is the ghost of a woman dressed in white who is common in the folklore of several Central European countries. These spirits are commonly related to bodies of water, such as rivers, springs, or wells, and could be both dangerous and beneficial to those who encountered them. Mythological creatures of Spanish folklore associated with the Legend of the Enchanted Woman, such as the Basque lamias, the Cantabrian anjanas, the Asturian xanas, and the Galician mouras, share characteristics of white ladies. In the region of Catalonia and in Mallorca, white ladies are omens of death, traversing forests and mountains on stormy nights. They appear as enormously tall women, dressed in white tunics, with a light in their hand and their eyes white. According to the legend, the white lady was the ghost of a woman who had killed her children because of an unrequited love.

During the period of New Spain, the legend of La Llorona underwent transformations. Because of fear of heresy, La Llorona could not be directly identified with pre-Hispanic goddesses, so the description and characteristics of the legend changed in order to adapt to the new standards of the colonists, although it retained its Indigenous essence: the white clothing, the long black hair, the wrenching cry of "¡Ay mis hijos!" and its relation to water. Her sight guarantees death or madness (in a similar manner to the pre-Hispanic deities described above) for those who try to discover the origin of that mournful moan. For the colonists, the pre-Hispanic goddess took the form of a woman in a flowing white dress, with her face covered by a vaporous veil (which hides the terrifying face of anguish), who crosses the cobbled alleyways and plazas of the city uttering a shattering cry of despair and defeat.

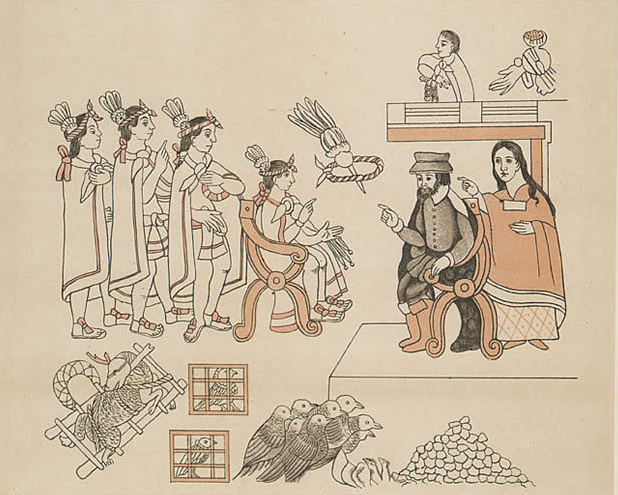
La Malinche translates at a meeting between Moctezuma II and Hernán Cortés. Lienzo de Tlaxcala

In colonial Mexico, the legend of La Llorona was identified with the story of La Malinche, a key figure during the Conquest of Mexico. This negative view of the story of Malinche and her relationship with Hernán Cortés is part of the Black legend of these figures. From here seem to come many of the versions that present La Llorona as the protagonist of a tragic story of love and betrayal between the Indigenous woman (or mestiza or criollo) and her Spanish lover, which finally leads her to infanticide as a manifestation of the desire to punish the man in the form of the lover, in some versions, or the woman's father, in others, for which she uses the child as the instrument of vengeance because the child is the proof of dishonor, but also, in some way, as a way of punishing herself for her weakness. However, although there are both popular and literary versions that associate the legend of La Llorona with Malinche, for some researchers, the two figures are absolute opposites, firstly because of historical reality (Malinche did not kill her children), and also because of their symbolism, since her status as Hernán Cortés's sexual slave created the basis of colonial domination by creating ties between Indigenous people and Spaniards. The legend of La Llorona rather destroys this basis by killing her mestizo children.

=== 19th century ===
A published reference to the legend is a 19th-century sonnet by Mexican poet Manuel Carpio. The poem makes no reference to infanticide, rather La Llorona is identified as the ghost of a woman named Rosalia who was murdered by her husband.

== Appearance ==
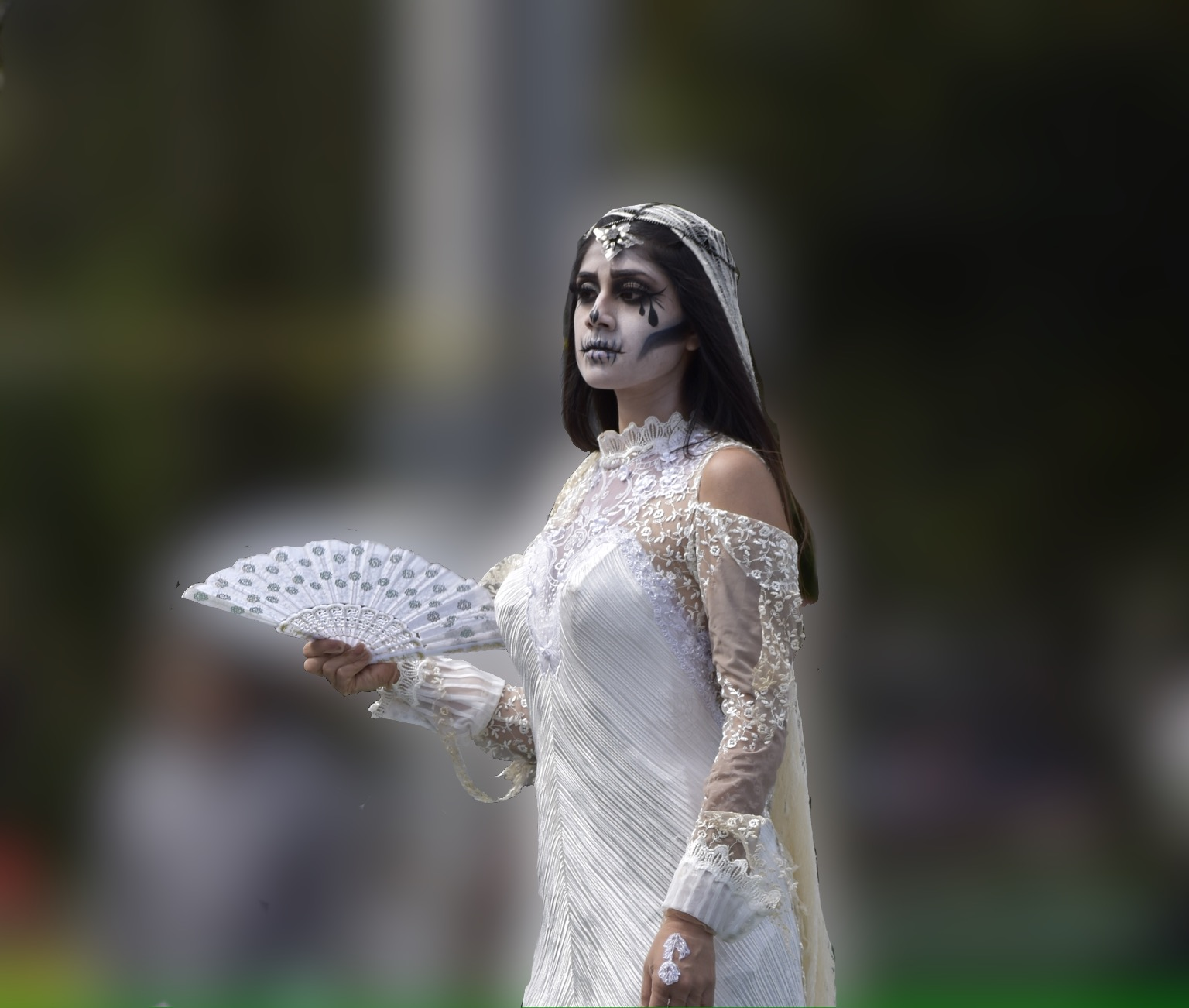
The classic appearance of La Llorona is that of a lady dressed in white with long black hair, although this may vary depending on the country.

Most accounts describe her as a woman dressed in white with long dark hair, combing her hair while crying. Her face may be pale like a skull. In some versions, she wears a long white robe and over it another black hooded robe. In some versions from Guatemala and in that of Aguascalientes, Mexico, she has a horse's face, like the Siguanaba or Cegua.

She may take on increasingly monstrous appearances as the story mixes with other local tales. In Costa Rica and Panama, the legend of La Llorona has similarities with that of the Tulevieja, originating among the Talamancan peoples of both countries, and the Tepesa, native to the indigenous regions and very popular in the Panamanian provinces of Los Santos, Veraguas and Chiriquí. The Tulevieja is a dirty and horrid old woman, dressed in rags and with bird legs, while the Tepesa has long tangled hair and a face covered with holes. Both legends tell stories of women who kill their children and are condemned to wander as horrifying monstrous specters.

In Colombia, La Llorona is the wandering ghost of a woman who roams valleys and mountains, near rivers and lagoons, dressed in a white robe that covers her down to her heels. She has long black curly hair, although it may also be silver, brown or golden, and crickets, fireflies and butterflies perch in it. Her face is a terrifying skull, and in the sockets of her eyes spin two incandescent spheres. The sleeves of her gown reach her wrists and with her large, bony and bloodied hands she rocks a dead baby. As she moans, La Llorona sheds tears of blood over the blue shroud of the child, which retains an angelic expression and whose eyes seem to accuse the mother who took its life. In Antioquia, La Llorona takes the name «María Pardo», while in the Pasto region she is called «Tarumama», a monstrous old woman with mule hooves for feet and large breasts slung over her back, punished as a wandering soul for abandoning the child she had out of wedlock in order to hide her shame.

In Venezuela, La Sayona is a similar character who appears to partying and unfaithful men, showing enormous fangs. During the colonial period, some women disguised themselves as the Sayona to go unnoticed and meet with their lovers.

Another similar character is the Widow, who appears in legends from Argentina and Chile. She is a tall thin woman dressed in black who appears in isolated places, roads and bridges, whose face, and sometimes feet, cannot be seen, making it seem as though she floats in the air. In the urban version this being smiles at men and sometimes accompanies them part of the way without harming them, while avoiding women; in the rural version, she is a tall gaunt woman dressed in white who walks on stilts and likes to steal travelers' belongings. In the region of Catamarca, Argentina, she is additionally given disheveled hair, very white and sensual feet, and the peculiarity of breathing fire from her mouth. In some stories, she can take the shape of animals. Like La Llorona, the legend says she is a woman who threw her child into a river, and like the Cegua and the Sayona, she can transform her face into a skull, and climbs onto the horses of unfaithful men to kill them with mortal fright through an icy embrace.

== Behavior ==
One aspect that varies in the stories is what the narrative says happens during an encounter with La Llorona. Folkloric accounts agree that, more than her physical appearance, the terror produced by La Llorona comes from her chilling wail, and often there is no direct contact with the specter. However, this can change. In some stories, whoever sees her may die, although these versions are the least common.

In El Salvador, La Llorona wanders through the streets of rural towns crying for her children. When she reaches a town, she enters through the main street, lets out her first scream and begins to cry, searching for the road leading to the community cemetery, or after entering the local church, disappears. Those who hear her experience chills throughout their bodies. If one turns their back on her, she will suddenly appear beside the person. The soul of anyone who looks at her and follows her will wander for all eternity.

In one Costa Rican version, it is noted that La Llorona is harmless because her only concern is finding her son, but in another version from the same country, encountering her can mean death, as she kills the person by mistaking them for her deceiver.

In Ecuador, after drowning her son, La Llorona searches for him until she finds his corpse, which is missing the little finger. For this reason, the ghost of La Llorona cuts off the little finger of anyone to whom she appears.

== Symbolism ==
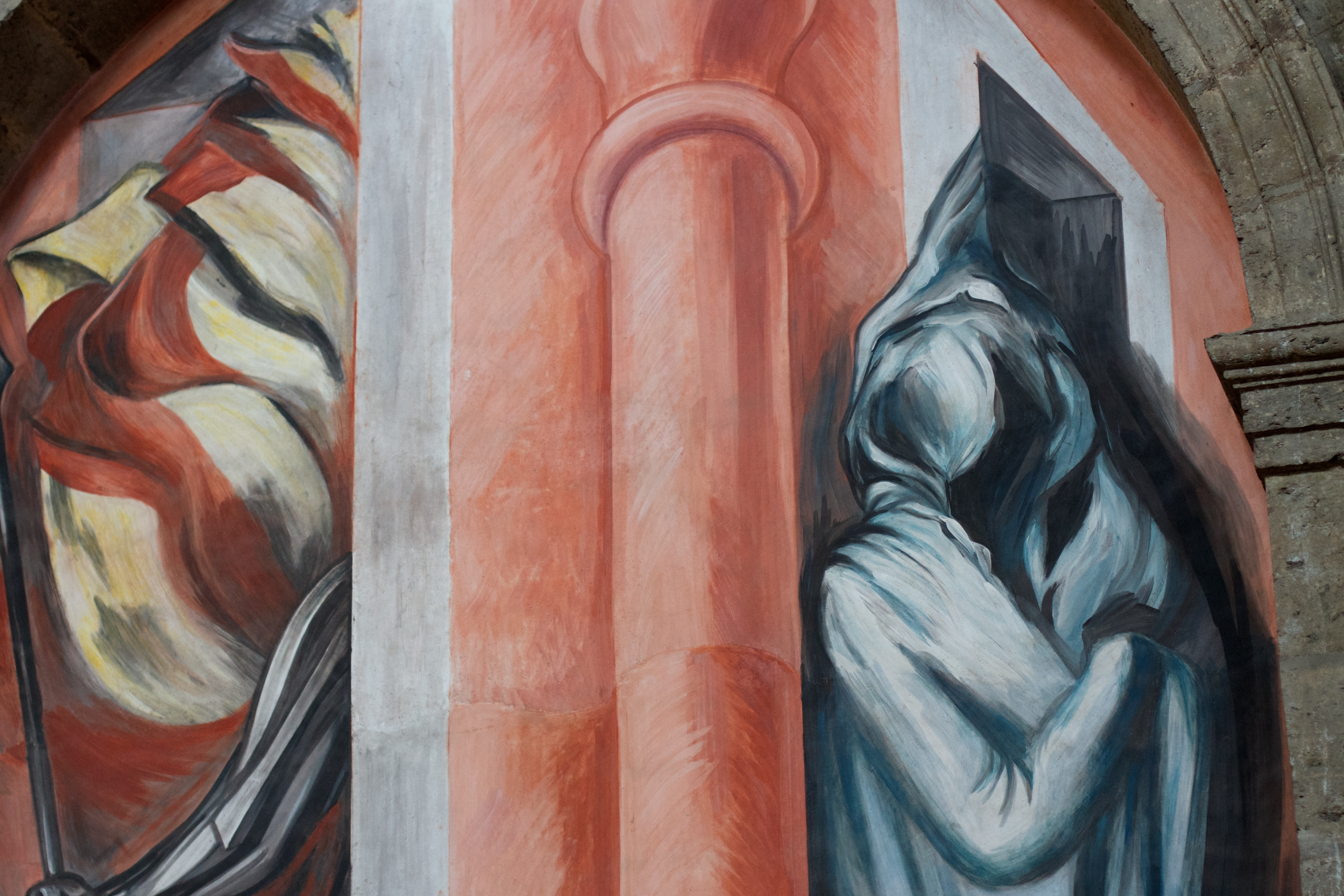
La Llorona in a mural by José Clemente Orozco, at the Instituto Cultural Cabañas, Guadalajara, Mexico

From the perspective of the Aarne–Thompson classification, tales of La Llorona are classified as type 300, «The Dragon Slayer», in relation to the fact that the numen behaves as a predator from which one must escape, because encountering it implies something sinister, ominous or unfortunate, and with the type of the Enchanted Woman, where the human being interacts with the numen in its area of power (in this particular case, water), through a series of trials, something frequent in stories involving aquatic spirits and in the practices of shamans. La Llorona may be considered a spirit of ill omen, and her nighttime cries and wails an oracle of unfortunate events. She can cause illness in people, worsen the condition of those already sick or bring curses upon loved ones, causing or foretelling death. With her message brought from the underworld, she bursts into villages to warn inhabitants of rising rivers and approaching misfortune, warning against carelessness, negligence and the lack of caution that leads to disaster and imbalance. Her association with night and the infernal-funerary realm links her to the archetype of the Triple Goddess: the virgin who later becomes a mother and finally gives way to the cadaverous and terrifying old woman, the witch. Like Hecate, La Llorona walks the roads as the foremost of the procession of night specters, the queen of American ghosts.

The story has several interpretations. From a literal point of view, the myth of La Llorona is the unanimous condemnation of the unnatural woman who, disobeying her mother's advice, makes her child pay for the deception inflicted upon her by her tormentor. It is a warning against sexual relations before marriage, against unwanted pregnancy and against abortion. La Llorona is the woman who, by renouncing her maternal role, is punished with a terrible sentence that she must suffer for all eternity, as a shocking example for future women and mothers. La Llorona frightens girls who have committed acts of which their parents would not be proud. In the history of this character, scholars have seen the behavior that the male-dominated colonial society demanded from women in general and Indigenous women in particular, involving punishment for failing to fulfill the maternal role assigned to them by virtue of being women. Deviating from that sociocultural task could only mean madness, death and suffering. La Llorona is a wandering and suffering spirit for having committed the gravest sin of a mother: killing her child.

But La Llorona does not only frighten women; rather, in the case of the male population, she terrifies those who roam at night, especially those engaged in reprehensible activities such as alcoholism and infidelity. Through her arts, La Llorona controls and represses male activities considered morally reprehensible, allowing social and cultural «normality» to return to its «course». By climbing onto the horses of night wanderers and killing them with an icy deadly embrace, by driving them mad and leaving them useless forever, by transforming her angelic face into that of a mortal skull or the terrifying head of a mare with decayed teeth that marks the unfaithful man's cheek with a kiss of death, she fulfills the role of a vengeful ghost.

The legend therefore has a moralizing function. This is not, however, its only function. Sometimes mothers punish and frighten their children by telling them that, if they disobey, La Llorona will come looking for them and frighten them at night, fulfilling a role as a bogeyman similar to El Coco. La Llorona fulfills the role of the terrifying guardian who warns of danger, deters the unwary and keeps children from drowning in ponds, lakes or rivers.

In the colonial context, the legend of La Llorona originally functioned as a horror story warning Indigenous peoples against disobedience to established authority, frightening and subjugating the Indigenous population at night in their towns. During the colonial era, all kinds of stories about the dead, ghosts and apparitions proliferated, whose ultimate purpose was to censor unrestrained behavior and all sorts of conduct considered immoral, in the particular case of La Llorona condemning illegitimate relationships. From a metaphorical point of view, La Llorona also represents either the goddess, mother, sister, wife or daughter, but above all the woman condemned to witness the historical abandonment of her symbolic children, the Indigenous peoples displaced militarily, politically and culturally by the Conquest. However, through the parabolic and poetic discourse reflected in her reinterpretation in modern literature and popular culture, when taken as an emblematic figure of Indigenous resistance and of marginalized or subordinate populations in society, she has been reinterpreted in the opposite sense: the extension and branching of her legends give voice to the different communities and territories of the Americas, with sometimes contradictory visions. Through these interpretations, La Llorona makes visible an ancient pain that nevertheless remains present through time, and she is equally the champion of the defeated Indigenous peoples who terrifies white conquerors, the defender of undocumented immigrants crossing the border into the southern United States, and a symbol of feminist discourse against patriarchal society among Chicano writers.

One of these modern stories or versions of the legend of La Llorona is used in the film The Curse of La Llorona (2019). In this version, María, a very beautiful woman married to a rich man, lives happily with her husband, but he leaves her for another wealthier woman. One day, the husband comes to María's house with another woman to see his children. Angered, María takes her children to the riverbed and drowns them. Shortly afterward she realizes her mistake and returns to the river to search for them. She searches for many hours and when she finally finds them, she realizes it is too late and they are already dead. She cries for days and days in her white dress by the riverbed without eating or drinking, and eventually dies of exhaustion. As a moral lesson, the story is used to discourage children from staying near rivers or from disobeying their parents. Today, in parts of Arizona and Mexico, many people claim to have had encounters with La Llorona.

== Regional versions ==
Throughout Latin America, there are various versions of the folktale of La Llorona. The legend has a wide variety of details and versions. In a typical version of the legend, a beautiful woman named María marries a rich ranchero / conquistador to whom she bears two children. One day, María sees her husband with another woman and in a fit of blind rage, she drowns their children in a river, which she immediately regrets. Unable to save them and consumed by guilt, she drowns herself as well but is unable to enter the afterlife, forced to be in purgatory and roam this earth until she finds her children. In another version of the story, her children are illegitimate, and she drowns them so that their father cannot take them away to be raised by his new wife.

Recurring themes in variations on the La Llorona myth include a white, wet dress, nocturnal wailing, and an association with water. The geography of each region plays a role in the characteristics of the legend. The presence of water appears in almost all versions, sometimes associated with specific sites relevant to each country. In Mexico the events occur in Lake Texcoco. In Costa Rica they occur in the Río Grande de Tárcoles. In Uruguay they take place at the lake in Parque Rivera in Montevideo. The scene may occur in large cities (Mexico City, Montevideo, Lima, etc.) or in rural settings.

=== Mexico ===
In Mexico, the story of La Llorona goes that an Indigenous woman named Luisa falls in love with don Nuño de Montes Claros, who abandons her, and in revenge she stabs the three children they had together. The woman is burned or hanged and becomes La Llorona, who wanders through the streets of Mexico City weeping over her tragedy.

==== La Malinche ====
Also in Mexico, La Llorona is often associated with the historical figure of La Malinche, an Indigenous woman who served as the interpreter of the Spanish, the lover and later wife of the conquistador Hernán Cortés, and who played an important role in the conquest and fall of Tenochtitlan. In this interpretation, La Llorona is less associated with bodies of water and instead is said to wander through the streets and rural areas of Mexico.

Several versions of the story circulate. In one version, the spirit of La Malinche becomes the ghost of La Llorona, returning from the afterlife in remorse for having betrayed the Indigenous peoples through her role in the Spanish conquest. Another version states that when Hernán Cortés returned to Spain he took their son, Martín Cortés, with him, while she was unable to prevent it, leaving her to wander in grief and weep for him.

A third, more symbolic version states that she weeps for her children, understood as the mestizos of the Mexican people, either in repentance for having delivered them to the Spanish or in mourning for the fate they later endured. Some accounts combine the first and third interpretations. According to local legend, the spirit of La Llorona wanders around the Plaza de la Conchita in Coyoacán and the nearby Casa Colorada, where she is said to have lived.

=== Guatemala ===
According to the local legend, in Guatemala City lived a woman who had an affair with a lover. She became pregnant and gave birth to a child named Juan de la Cruz whom she drowned so her husband would not know. The woman was condemned in the afterlife to search for her murdered son in every place where there is a pool of water. She does that by crying out for him—hence her moniker of the Wailing Woman (La Llorona). It is a popular scary legend that in one iteration or another has been told to generations of children. The terrifying cry of "Oh, my children!!" ("¡Ay mis hijos!") is well known due to the story. Additionally, one peculiar detail is that when a person hears the cry from afar means that the ghost is nearby, but if the cry is heard nearby, it means the ghost is afar. Someone unlucky enough to face the specter is "won over" to the afterlife, never to be seen again. The legend is deeply rooted in Antigua Guatemala, the former capital of the Kingdom of Guatemala (current Central America and southern state of Chiapas, Mexico)

In Guatemala, La Llorona takes the name María, (Note: Besides Guatemala, the name María for La Llorona is common in many other Spanish-speaking countries. María is the most common female name in Latin America. In Mexico, the most common is María Guadalupe, followed by María alone. See ¿Cuáles son los nombres más comunes en la comunidad latina? and Estos son los 100 nombres más comunes de México desde 1900.) and is the restless soul of a woman of criollo (Spanish-descended) or mestiza origin, from a high socioeconomic stratum, who cheats on her husband with a hacienda servant and becomes pregnant. She then decides to drown her son, named Juan de la Cruz, bringing about a curse. In Guatemala it is also said that the closer her cries seem, the farther away she actually is, and when the cries seem distant it means she is passing close to the listener.

=== El Salvador ===
In El Salvador, La Llorona is said to wander through the streets of rural towns crying for her children. When she reaches a town, she enters along the main street, lets out her first cry, and begins to wail while searching for the road that leads to the community cemetery; in other accounts, after entering the local church she disappears. Those who hear her experience chills throughout their bodies. If someone turns their back on her, she suddenly appears beside them. The soul of anyone who looks at her and follows her will wander for all eternity.

=== Nicaragua ===
In Nicaragua, La Llorona is said to be the restless soul of an Indigenous woman from Moyogalpa, on Ometepe Island, who fell in love with a white man against her mother's advice (“the blood of the slave should not mix with the blood of the executioner”). When abandoned, she drowns her child in Lake Nicaragua but, repentant, jumps into the water to save him without success.

=== Costa Rica ===
In Costa Rica, La Llorona is said to be a beautiful Indigenous woman, daughter of a Huetar king, who falls in love with a Spanish conquistador. They secretly meet atop a waterfall; she becomes pregnant and gives birth to a child, who is killed by her father by throwing him from the waterfall. Cursed by him, she wanders forever along rivers searching for her lost son, pursued by evil spirits and lamenting her fate.

In one version from Costa Rica, La Llorona is described as harmless because her only concern is finding her son, but in another version from the same country encountering her may mean death, as she kills the person after mistaking them for the one who wronged her.

=== Puerto Rico ===
In Puerto Rico, the legend merges with that of the vanishing hitchhiker. According to oral tradition, a woman appears on the Las Calabazas bridge asking for a ride. If ignored, she suddenly appears inside the car; if refused, a tire will soon puncture and she will appear again. She is believed to be the spirit of a woman searching for her child, who was killed together with him after a sexual assault.

=== Colombia ===
In Colombia, the legend describes the spirit of a woman who killed her newborn child and left him near a stream, where the current carried him away. She was condemned to wander forever crying and lamenting her crime while searching for her son. Some say she carries the dead child in her arms. In Pasto she is described as a demonic figure who appears on nights of the full moon, and on 31 October she is said to walk through cemeteries holding a candle while searching for her child. Anyone who looks into her eyes becomes trapped and tormented by her terrible screams.

=== Venezuela ===
The tale of La Llorona is set in the Venezuelan Llanos (Plains) during the colonial period. La Llorona is said to be the spirit of a young woman that died of sorrow after her children were killed, either by herself or by her family. Families traditionally place wooden crosses above their doors to ward off such spirits.

In the filicidal version, the woman falls in love with a soldier who abandons her after she becomes pregnant. Not knowing how to raise a child and driven mad by the infant's crying, she kills him with her own hands. Repentant, her wailing attracts neighbors and relatives, who curse her. She flees into the plains and becomes a spirit that steals children who are alone, either in their homes or near rivers or streams.

=== Ecuador ===
The Ecuadorian version often features a woman known as either La Llorona de Los Ríos (The Crying Woman of the Rivers) or La Llorona de Los Andes (The Crying Woman of the Andes) depending on the region. In this story, she lost her lover and, in desperation, drowned her children in a river. She now cries uncontrollably and searches the riverbanks for her missing children. Nonetheless, one of its main focuses is the environment of Ecuadorian rivers and mountains. The Ecuadorian La Llorona is known for her connection to rivers, like the Guayas River, where locals say they can hear her somber cries at night. The tale of La Llorona warns kids about disobedience and the importance of avoiding bodies of water and locations at night, similar to other versions around the world.

In Ecuador, after drowning her son, La Llorona searches until she finds his corpse, which is missing the little finger. For this reason, the ghost of La Llorona cuts off the little finger of anyone to whom she appears.

=== Peru ===
In Peru, La Llorona's mournful cry is said to foretell death for people living near farmers who dare to enter huaca ruins, which is why locals avoid entering ancient Indigenous monuments. The myth is widespread in northern coastal and Andean regions of Peru.

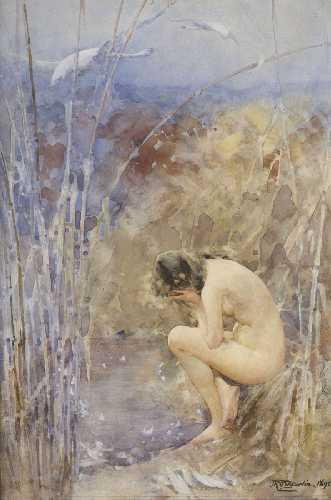
In many folkloric accounts, people encounter La Llorona wandering near rivers, or hear her anguished cry. Female Nude in the Reeds by John Reinhard Weguelin.

Another variation concerns the motive for killing the child or children. Most stories say the woman murders her children after being abandoned by the father, either out of madness or revenge. In some versions, however, the death is accidental while the mother is washing clothes in a river, as occurs in versions from Mexico, Guatemala, and Nicaragua. In a Costa Rican version, La Llorona drowns her newborn child out of madness and shame after being rejected by her family or community for becoming pregnant outside marriage. In another Costa Rican account she suffers from mental illness and accidentally drowns her child while bathing him in the river. A Venezuelan version recounts that the woman killed each of her children at birth without remorse. When the village priest discovers she is pregnant again, he advises her to breastfeed the child before killing it. After doing so she feels overwhelming guilt and wanders the countryside weeping and searching for her children, frightening anyone who crosses her path.

=== Uruguay ===
In Uruguay, La Llorona and her child drown accidentally in the lake at Parque Rivera in Montevideo during a stormy night. Some accounts omit the children entirely, attributing the legend to the murder of the woman and her husband by thieves who threw their bodies into the same lake, which explains the crying heard there at certain times of the month.

=== United States ===
In the Southwestern United States, the story of La Llorona is told to scare children into good behavior, sometimes specifically to deter children from playing near dangerous water. Also told to them is that her cries are heard as she walks around the street or near bodies of water to scare children from wandering around, resembling the stories of El Cucuy. In Chumash mythology indigenous to Southern California, La Llorona is linked to the nunašɨš, a mythological creature with a cry similar to that of a newborn baby. It is a very popular story.

== Chicana feminism and the decolonization of La Llorona ==
In the late twentieth century, Chicana feminist writers and poets began retelling the story of La Llorona, portraying her as a symbol of resistance and female identity. Chicana writers and artists redefined La Llorona based on embodied experience and the social and political pressures they faced. The rise of Chicana feminism and the Chicano movement encouraged Chicana writers and artists to reinvent their historical and cultural Mexican presence in the United States. La Llorona was rewritten as a strong woman who had been forced to accommodate to the colonizers ruling and had been punished for challenging traditional female roles. Chicanas related to the agony that La Llorona faced while being stripped of her identity by Spanish colonizers. La Llorona symbolizes the pain and grief and became a metaphorical representation of the challenges and struggles faced by marginalized groups.

Writers Gloria Anzaldúa and Sandra Cisneros present her as a spiritual guide representing colonial oppression and patriarchal hierarchies. Anzaldúa reinterprets La Llorona’s wail as the resistance of Indian, Mexican, and Chicana women against border violence, reproductive injustice, gender discrimination, domestic violence, and other issues associated with colonization and patriarchal control. Cisneros’s depiction of La Llorona reimagines her as a weeping victim to a hollering, independent figure.

=== Gloria Anzaldúa ===
Gloria Anzaldúa challenges colonialism by repositioning La Llorona within the Aztec and Indigenous family tree. In Anzaldúa's poem "My Black Angelos", La Llorona is reimagined as a figure whose roots trace back to the Aztecs, reclaiming spiritual and cultural authority taken by the Spanish. Anzaldúa's young protagonist, Pretita, encounters La Llorona while lost in the woods searching for an herb to save her mother. Pretita hears La Llorona's wail, but instead of taking the child, she points Pretita to the herb needed to save her mother. Anzaldúa illustrates how La Llorona functions as a guide for Chicanas navigating trauma, displacement, and border identity.

=== Sandra Cisneros ===
In her short story "Woman Hollering Creek", Sandra Cisneros offers another reinterpretation of La Llorona. The protagonist, Cleófilas, experiences patriarchal violence and emotional abandonment similar to traditional La Llorona narratives. However, unlike the weeping woman, Cleófilas does not direct her suffering toward her children. Instead, she escapes domestic abuse through the support of other women. In a pivotal scene, a woman named Felice drives Cleófilas towards her freedom. As Felice crosses the bridge over La Gritona, a creek named after the wailing woman, she hollers, signifying freedom. Cisneros transforms La Llorona's despairing wail into one of joy, power, and liberation.

== In popular culture ==
=== Film ===
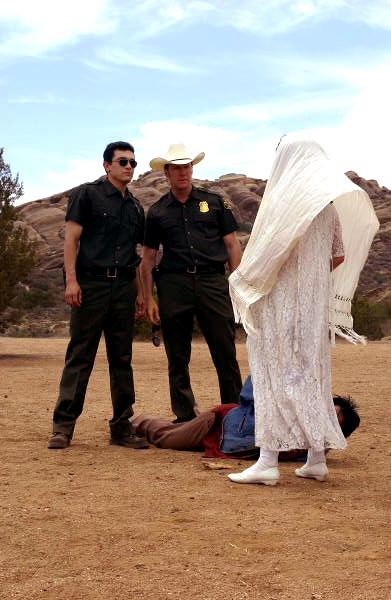
Actress representing La Llorona in The Mexican Dream, 2003

The story of La Llorona first appeared on film in 1933's La Llorona, filmed in Mexico. René Cardona's 1960 film La Llorona was also shot in Mexico, as was the 1963 horror film The Curse of the Crying Woman, directed by Rafael Baledón.

In a pivotal scene in the 2001 film Mulholland Drive, Rebekah Del Rio plays La Llorona de Los Angeles, a mysterious singer who performs Llorando, a Spanish language version of "Crying" by Roy Orbison. In keeping with the legend, the characters who witness this performance suffer severe consequences.

The 2008 Mexican horror film Kilometer 31 is inspired by the legend of La Llorona.

La Llorona is the primary antagonist in the 2007 movie J-ok'el. In the 2011 Mexican animated film La Leyenda de la Llorona, she is portrayed as a more sympathetic character, whose children die in an accident rather than at their mother's hands.

In the 2017 Pixar film Coco, "La Llorona", the Mexican folk song popularized by Andres Henestrosa in 1941 is sung by Alanna Ubach in her role as Mamá Imelda, joined by Antonio Sol as the singing voice of Ernesto de la Cruz.

In July 2019, James Wan, Gary Dauberman and Emilie Gladstone produced a film titled The Curse of La Llorona for Warner Bros. Pictures. A sequel, The Revenge of La Llorona, is set to be theatrically released.

Also in 2019, Jayro Bustamante directed the Guatemalan film La Llorona, starring María Mercedes Coroy, which screened in the Contemporary World Cinema section at the 2019 Toronto International Film Festival.

The Legend of La Llorona was a film released in January 2022 and stars Danny Trejo, Autumn Reeser, and Antonio Cupo.

=== Theater ===
Mexican playwright Josefina López wrote Unconquered Spirits, which uses the myth of La Llorona as a plot device. The play premiered at California State University, Northridge's Little Theatre in 1995.

=== Literature ===
Nancy Farmer's 2002 science fiction novel, The House of the Scorpion includes references to La Llorona.

The legend of La Llorona is discussed in Jaquira Díaz's 2019 memoir, Ordinary Girls:

The scariest part was not that La Llorona was a monster, or that she came when you called her name three times in the dark, or that she could come into your room at night and take you from your bed like she'd done with her own babies. It was that once she'd been a person, a woman, a mother. And then a moment, an instant, a split second later, she was a monster.

The novel Paola Santiago and the River of Tears, the first part of a young adult trilogy by Tehlor Kay Mejia, is based on the legend of La Llorona.

Rodolfo Anaya's novel Bless Me, Ultima references La Llorona, describing her as a spirit of the river without mentioning her origins.

In Summer of the Mariposas, by Guadalupe Garcia McCall, she serves as a mentor to the Garza Sisters.

The Weeping Woman: Encounters with La Llorona by Edward Garcia Kraul and Judith Beatty brings together of encounters and retellings of La Llorona with diverse perspectives and different regions.

Bess Lomax Hawes, an American folklorist, published his article La Llorona in Juvenile Hall in 1968, containing details of the hauntings in California's juvenile detention facility with sightings of a "weeping woman".

The Figure of the Monster in Global Theatre: Further Readings on the Aesthetics of Disqualification, is a valuable resource that gives insight on international perspectives on "monster" figures in writing. Makes many references to La Llorona and explores La Llorona within Chicano culture.

=== Music ===
"La Llorona" is a Mexican folk song popularized by Andres Henestrosa in 1941. It has since been covered by various musicians, including Chavela Vargas, Joan Baez, Lila Downs, and Rosalía.

North American singer-songwriter Lhasa de Sela's debut album La Llorona (1997) explored the dark mysteries of Latin folklore. She combined a variety of musical genres including klezmer, gypsy jazz and Mexican folk music, all in the Spanish language. The album was certified Platinum in Canada, and it earned her a Canadian Juno Award for Best Global Artist in 1998.

=== Television ===
La Llorona is an antagonist in the TV series Supernatural, portrayed by Sarah Shahi in the pilot episode and by Shanae Tomasevich in "Moriah" and season 15.

La Llorona is an antagonist in a 2012 second-season episode of the TV series Grimm.

La Llorona appears in the Victor and Valentino episode "The Lonely Haunts 3: La Llorona" voiced by Vanessa Marshall. Contrary to the usual depictions, this version of La Llorona is good and simply lonely and claims to have had twenty kids who had all grown up and left her; implying that she suffers from Empty nest syndrome.

La Llorona appears in the Riverdale episode "Chapter 97: Ghost Stories". The characters tell ghost stories about people related to them or the town that had died. La Llorona is one. She haunts Sweetwater River and she also manages to possess Toni and take Betty's unborn child away.

=== Art ===
La Llorona is portrayed as a protective figure in the 2004 mural, La Llorona’s Sacred Waters by Juana Alicia. The mural also includes the Aztec goddess, Chalchiuhtlicue. It is a large, blue mural with red elements that is two stories high and sixty feet long. Juana Alicia painted La Llorona’s Sacred Waters due to warnings of water damage in one of her murals, Las Lechugeras (1983). Both murals depict women's environmental and labor struggles and their roles in environmental justice. Despite the representation of water through the use of blue in La Llorona's Sacred Waters, she used a monochromatic color palette, with the exception of red, in order to not distract the viewers. She uses the palette to draw attention to the seriousness of the subject and to keep a somber tone. She also used blue and red due to their affiliations with gangs in order to unify different groups of people. La Llorona is reimagined in La Llorona's Sacred Waters as a protector of the people, used as a cultural anchor, represents womanhood, and in a multitude of other ways.

=== Distilling ===
Tears of Llorona, an extra añejo tequila named after the ghost, earned the top score in its category at the 2025 World Spirits Championships.

== Parallels with other cultures ==
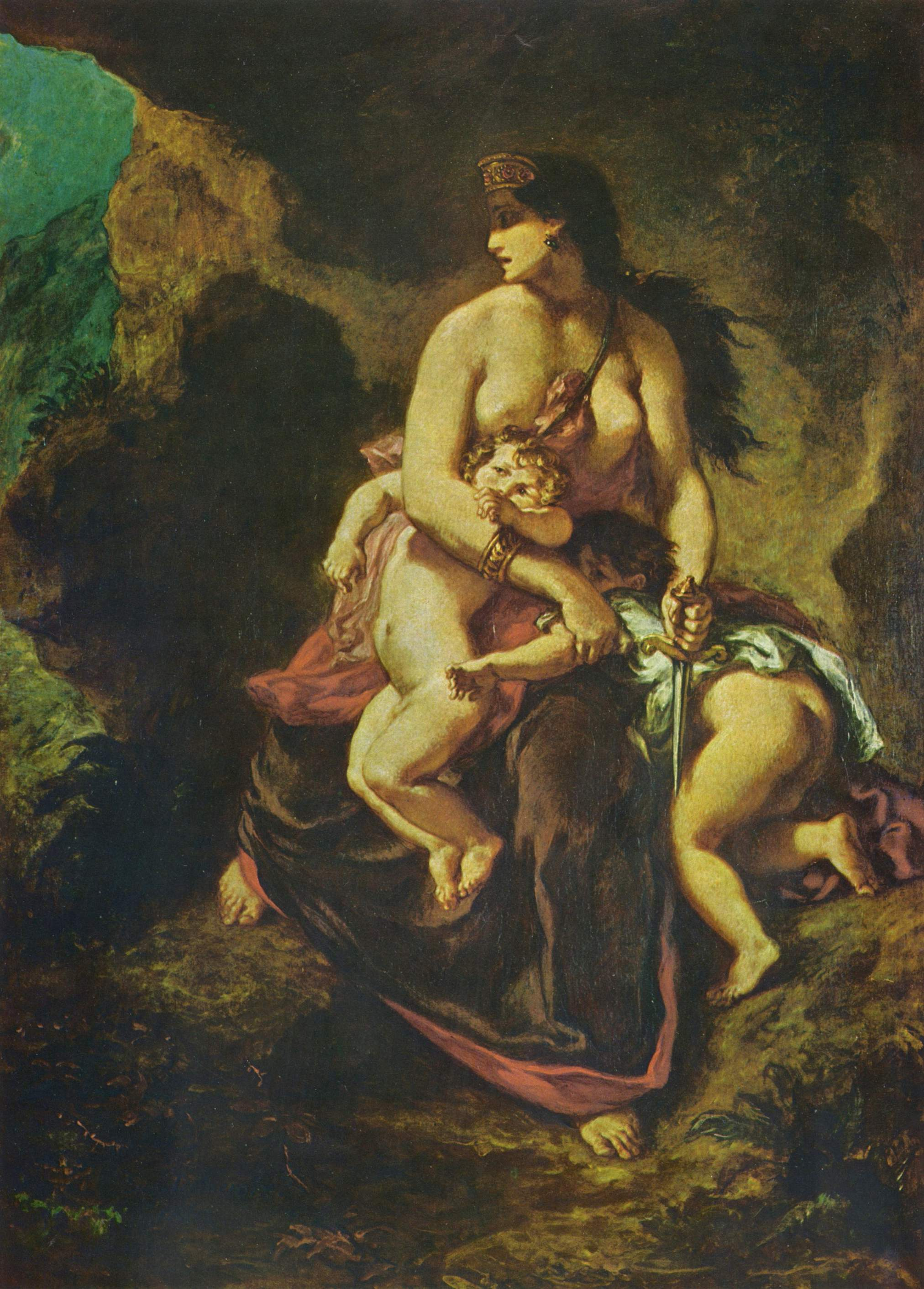
In Greek mythology, Medea murders her children after being abandoned by Jason. In the image, Medea About to Kill Her Children, by Delacroix (1862)

Around the world there are myths and legends about beings with characteristics similar to those of La Llorona.

In Greek mythology, for example, similarities can be found with the myth of Medea, who murdered her own children after her husband Jason (whom she had helped recover the Golden Fleece) abandoned her for another woman. Likewise, the Greeks also told the legend of Lamia, a princess with whom Zeus had several children, who were murdered by Hera. Lamia then wandered lamenting the loss of her children and devouring the children of other mothers.

In Celtic mythology, the banshee was a female spirit who announced a person's death through overwhelming moans that could be heard over long distances. Another similar being is the Ploranera, from Catalan folklore, described as «a surly old woman who, instead of speaking, howls, shrieks and snores. She is believed to reside in the peaks of the Morunys, near the place of Sant Llorenç del Piteus, in the Vall del Hort».

In Africa, among the Yoruba peoples of Dahomey and Togo, a legend is told that describes the wind as a woman who travels along rivers uttering terrifying laments and searching for her murdered children. They were drowned by the ocean (which in this myth is also a woman) and their remains scattered across the world. This legend, which bears strong similarities to that of La Llorona, was introduced into the United States by African slaves brought by Europeans to the Americas and is especially well known in southern states such as Louisiana.

Chinese folklore is rich in ghost stories and legends, and one such story tells of the appearance of a woman dressed in white who cries and laments through the corridors of the Forbidden City.

In Japan, ghosts who return to the world to exact revenge are called onryō. These are generally women dressed in a white kimono, with long black hair and pale skin. The Kuchisake-onna, a yōkai, is a woman with a slit mouth who appears at night to young men in order to slash their faces.

In the Philippines there are two legends similar to that of La Llorona. In one of them, the ghost of a mermaid howls at sea during the night lamenting the murder of her children by a fisherman. When her crying is heard, it means someone has drowned. In the other version, known as the legend of the White Woman, the ghost dwells in the fog and captures young women once a year, trapping them in the mist amid great shrieks.

In Malay and Indonesian mythology, the Pontianak is the vampiric specter of a woman who died while giving birth and who takes revenge on men. She announces her presence by emitting a sound resembling the crying of a baby. The Pontianak takes revenge on mothers by stealing their children after they give birth.

== See also ==
- Banshee
- Baobhan sith
- Black Lady of Bradley Woods
- Bloody Mary (folklore)
- Bogeyman
- Clíodhna
- Hulder
- Kuchisake-onna
- Leannán sídhe
- Madam Koi Koi
- Manananggal
- Medea
- Pontianak (folklore)
- Rusalka
- Samodiva (mythology)
- Sayona
- The Silbón
- Siren
- Soucouyant
- Succubus
- Tulevieja
- White Lady (ghost)
- Witte Wieven
- El Naddaha

== Bibliography ==
- Alcalá, María Eugenia (2013). El cuerpo del delito: La leyenda de La Llorona en Costa Rica [The body of the crime: the legend of La Llorona in Costa Rica] (in Spanish). San José: Editorial Universidad Estatal a Distancia.
- Alducin, William (2017). Leyendas macabras del centro histórico [Macabre legends of the historic center] (in Spanish). Ciudad de México: Sista. ISBN 9786074340747.
- de Aragon, Ray John. The Legend of La Llorona, Sunstone Press, 2006. ISBN 978-0-86534-505-8.
- Asensio, Raúl H. (2019). La ciudad acorralada: jóvenes y violencia en el Perú [The besieged city: young people and violence in Peru] (in Spanish). Lima: Instituto de Estudios Peruanos.
- Bane, Theresa (2016). Encyclopedia of Spirits and Ghosts in World Mythology. Jefferson, North Carolina: McFarland. ISBN 9781476663555.
- Caso, Alfonso (2014). El pueblo del sol [The people of the sun] (in Spanish). México: Fondo de Cultura Económica. ISBN 9786071621931.
- Colombres, Adolfo; Deambrosi, Ricardo (1984). Seres sobrenaturales de la cultura popular argentina [Supernatural Beings of Argentine Popular Culture] (in Spanish). Ediciones Del Sol. p. 203. ISBN 9789509413009.
- De Valle Arizpe, Artemio (2010). Historia, tradiciones y leyendas de calles de México [History, traditions and legends of streets of Mexico] (in Spanish). Vol. 2. México D.F.: Lectorum México. ISBN 978-9707322844.
- Fernández Poncela, Anna M. (2000). Protagonismo femenino en cuentos y leyendas de México y Centroamérica [Female Protagonism in Tales and Legends of Mexico and Central America] (in Spanish). Narcea Ediciones. p. 96. ISBN 9788427713345.
- Fernández Poncela, Anna M. (2000). "María llorona, mujer, cultura y mito" [María Llorona, woman, culture and myth]. El Cotidiano (in Spanish). 16 (104): 34–42.
- Fernández Poncela, Anna M. (2000). "María llorona, mujer, cultura y mito" [María Llorona, woman, culture and myth]. El Cotidiano (in Spanish). 16 (104): 34–42.
- Fernández Poncela, Anna M. (2000). "María llorona, mujer, cultura y mito" [María Llorona, woman, culture and myth]. El Cotidiano (in Spanish). 16 (104): 34–42.
- Fernández Poncela, Anna M. (2000). "María llorona, mujer, cultura y mito" [María Llorona, woman, culture and myth]. El Cotidiano (in Spanish). 16 (104): 34–42.
- Florescano, Enrique; Santana, Bárbara (2018). La fiesta mexicana [The Mexican Festival] (in Spanish). Fondo de Cultura Económica. p. 474. ISBN 9786071656629.
- Garcia, Belinda Vasquez. The Witch Narratives Reincarnation, Magic Prose Publishing, 2012. ISBN 9781466429796.
- González Torres, Yolotl (1995). Diccionario de mitología y religión de Mesoamérica [Dictionary of mythology and religion of Mesoamerica] (in Spanish). México: Editorial Larousse. ISBN 970-607-802-9.
- Herrera-Sobek, María (2012). "La Llorona". Celebrating Latino Folklore: An Encyclopedia of Cultural Traditions. Vol. 1. Santa Barbara: ABC-CLIO. ISBN 9780313343391.
- Jara, Carla Victoria; García Segura, Alí (2003). Diccionario de mitología bribri [Dictionary of Bribri mythology] (in Spanish). San José: Editorial de la Universidad de Costa Rica. ISBN 9977-67-738-7.
- Mathews, Holly F. 1992. "The Directive Force of Morality Tales in a Mexican Community". In Human Motives and Cultural Models, edited by R. G. D'Andrade and C. Strauss, 127–162. New York: Cambridge University Press.
- Medina, Andrés (1996). La etnografía de Mesoamérica meridional y el área circuncaribe [The ethnography of southern Mesoamerica and the Circum-Caribbean area] (in Spanish). Universidad Nacional Autónoma de México. ISBN 9683648479.
- Montecino Aguirre, Sonia (2016). Mitos de Chile: Enciclopedia de seres, apariciones y encantos [Myths of Chile: Encyclopedia of Beings, Apparitions and Enchantments] (in Spanish). Editorial Catalonia. p. 728. ISBN 9789563244373.
- Montoya, Víctor (2009). "Mitos de la tradición oral" [Myths of the oral tradition]. Arte y cultura sin fronteras / Revista Día y Noche.
- Norget, Kristin (2006). Days of Death, Days of Life: Ritual in the Popular Culture of Oaxaca. New York: Columbia University Press. ISBN 0-231-13688-9.
- Ocampo López, Javier (2001). Mitos y leyendas de Antioquia la grande [Myths and legends of greater Antioquia] (in Spanish). Bogotá: Plaza y Janés Editores Colombia. ISBN 9581403531.
- Ocampo López, Javier (2006). Mitos y leyendas latinoamericanas [Latin American myths and legends] (in Spanish). Bogotá: Plaza y Janés Editores Colombia. ISBN 9789581403691.
- Pearce (2009). Title.
- Perez, Domino Renee. (2008). There Was a Woman: La Llorona from Folklore to Popular Culture. Austin: U of Texas Press. ISBN 978-0292718128.
- Perez, Domino Renee (2008). There was a woman: La Llorona. University of Texas. p. 278. ISBN 9780292718111.
- Pollak-Eltz, Angelina (1985). María Lionza, mito y culto venezolano [María Lionza, Venezuelan myth and cult] (in Spanish). Caracas: Manoa. ISBN 9789802440016.
- Sánchez, Manuel Martín (2002). Seres míticos y personajes fantásticos españoles [Spanish mythical beings and fantastic characters] (in Spanish). Madrid: EDAF. ISBN 9788441410534.
- Werner, Michael S. (1997). Encyclopedia of Mexico: History, Society & Culture. Vol. 1. Chicago: Fitzroy Dearborn. ISBN 1-884964-31-1.
- Yoda, Hiroko; Alt, Matt (2013). Yurei Attack!: The Japanese Ghost Survival Guide. Tuttle Publishing. ISBN 9784805312193.
- Zamorano Rojas, Alma Delia (2011). "La llorona: leyenda híbrida en la cinematografía mexicana" [La Llorona: hybrid legend in Mexican cinema]. In Bort Gual, Iván; García Catalán, Shaila; Martín Núñez, Marta (eds.). Actas del IV Congreso Internacional sobre análisis fílmico. Nuevas tendencias e hibridaciones de los discursos audiovisuales en la cultura digital contemporánea (in Spanish). Madrid: Ediciones de las Ciencias Sociales. ISBN 978-84-87510-57-1.
- Zeledón Cartín, Elías (2000). Leyendas costarricenses [Costa Rican legends] (in Spanish). San José: Editorial Universidad Estatal a Distancia.
- Zeledón Cartín, Elías (2012). Cuentos, mitos y leyendas de Costa Rica [Tales, myths and legends of Costa Rica] (in Spanish). San José: Editorial Universidad Estatal a Distancia.
