= La Llorona (1960 film) =

- Theatrical release poster
- Directed by: René Cardona
- Written by: Adolfo Torres Portillo (screenplay); Carmen Toscano (Stage play)
- Produced by: José Luis Bueno
- Starring: María Elena Marqués; Mauricio Garcés; Eduardo Fajardo; Luz María Aguilar
- Cinematography: Jack Draper
- Edited by: Jorge Bustos
- Music by: Luis Mendoza López
- Release date: 17 November 1960
- Running time: 75 minutes
- Country: Mexico
- Language: Spanish

La Llorona (English: The Crying Woman) is a 1960 Mexican film directed by René Cardona. Based on the tale of La Llorona, it tells of a family that is cursed by the evil spirit of Luisa, this story's "weeping woman". The film was filmed on location in Guanajuato, Mexico.

== Plot ==
In 20th century Mexico, newly wed couple Felipe (Mauricio Garcés) and Margarita (Luz María Aguilar) are visited by Margarita's father, Don Gerardo Montes (Carlos López Moctezuma), who tells them the story of La Llorona.

In 16th century Mexico, an Indian and Spanish woman named Luisa is visited by an upper class Spanish conquistador named Don Nuño de Montesclaros (Eduardo Farjado). She falls in love with the man so much so that she leaves her life to start anew with Don Nuño. Don Nuño and Luisia have a boy and girl. However, Don Nuño leaves, as he must go on missions. Days later she is visited by one of Nuño's fellow conquistadors. He tells her that Don Nuño will not return home for a long time due to his duties. Suspicious, she follows the conquistador and comes to a palace where she finds Don Nuño. He explains that he will marry a new woman since Luisa is not fully Spanish. Enraged and heartbroken, she curses Don Nuño and his descendants that all his bloodline's firstborn will be murdered violently. When she returns home, she stabs her own children to death. The entire town finds out and Luisa is sentenced to death.

Gerardo finishes the story and says that Margarita's brother was murdered violently when he was four because he was a firstborn. Felipe passes the story off as just a folktale but the house is then visited by a woman in a black cloak who is taking up the job of a nanny for Felipe and Margarita's newborn baby. Luisa (under the alias "Carmen Asiul") is accepted but secretly plans on murdering the baby. She tries killing the baby many times but is unsuccessful with each attempt. Gerardo is suspicious of the new nanny since he feels he has seen her before but cannot make out where.

One night Felipe and Margarita decide to go out, leaving only Luisa and Gerardo home. Luisa is prepared to kill the baby using the very dagger with which she killed her own children. Gerardo realizes that it is Luisa and rushes to the baby's bedroom. Luisa is somehow pulled back and as Gerardo opens the door, he finds that Luisa has vanished and the dagger is impaled on the ground. With the baby safe, the parents home, and Luisa's ghost gone, Gerardo burns the dagger and the drawing of Luisa in a fire. He realizes that the curse under which his family had suffered for years is finally gone.

== Cast ==
- María Elena Marqués as Luisa del Carmen / La Llorona / Carmen Asiul
- Eduardo Fajardo as Don Nuño de Montes Claros
- Luz María Aguilar as Margarita Montes
- Carlos López Moctezuma as Don Gerardo Montes
- Mauricio Garcés as Felipe Arnáiz
- Marina Banquells as Jorgito
- Juan José Martínez Casado as Tristán
- Emma Roldán as María
- Francisco Pando as Fraile
- David Reynoso as Juez
- Erna Martha Bauman as Doña Ana
- Manuel Casanueva as Jaime, mayordomo (uncredited)
- Rubén Márquez as Autoridad época colonial

== Production ==
This is a literal retelling of the legend of La Llorona (the crying woman), present in many Latin American countries, a symbol of the native woman who betrayed her people by becoming the mistress of a conquistador, and a bad mother – in this case, a very bad mother, "a la Medea"– who kills the children she had with her Spanish conquistador lover. Taking parts from Carmen Toscano's stage play, the film is set in contemporary México, but flashbacks a few centuries to tell Llorona's sad story. She is now the nanny of the grandson of a descendant of those who punished her, and plans to kill their Child. One curious detail (typical of Mexican horror films): the part of the little boy, Jorgito, is played by a girl. María Elena Marqués leads a cast of distinguished Spanish performers.

== See also ==
- List of ghost films
