= The Holy Office (film) =

1974 drama film by Arturo Ripstein

- Theatrical poster
- Directed by: Arturo Ripstein
- Written by: Arturo Ripstein; José Emilio Pacheco
- Produced by: Angélica Ortiz
- Starring: Jorge Luke; Claudio Brook
- Cinematography: Jorge Stahl Jr.
- Release date: 1974
- Running time: 127 minutes
- Country: Mexico
- Languages: Spanish, Hebrew, Latin

The Holy Office (Spanish: El santo oficio) is a 1974 Mexican drama film directed and co-written by Arturo Ripstein. It was nominated for the Palme d'Or at the 1974 Cannes Film Festival and won the Silver Goddess for Best Film in 1974 awarded by the Mexican Cinema Journalists.

== Plot ==
The Carvajal family is mourning the death of their patriarch. Their eldest son, raised in a monastery for most of his life, is shocked to witness signs of his family observing the Laws of Moses, cleaning his father's body, and uttering Hebrew words. He reports his suspicions to his superiors, and brings to bear the bureaucratic wrath of the Inquisition upon his grieving mother, sister, brothers, and much of the secret Jewish community of 16th Century New Spain that they belong to.

== Cast ==
- Jorge Luke - Luis de Carvajal
- Diana Bracho - Mariana de Carvajal
- Claudio Brook - Alonso de Peralta
- Ana Mérida - Francisca
- Arturo Beristáin - Baltasar
- Martha Navarro - Catalina Morales
- Silvia Mariscal - Justa Méndez
- Antonio Bravo - Rabine Morales
- Peter Gonzales Falcón - Fray Gaspar (as Peter Gonzales)
- Mario Castillón Bracho - Gregorio López
- Farnesio de Bernal - Fray Hernando
- Rafael Banquells - Principal of the Real Audience
- Jorge Fegán - Padre Oroz
- Martín LaSalle - Díaz Márquez
- Florencio Castelló - Fray Lorenzo de Albornoz
- Carlos Nieto - Inquisidor Juan Lobo Guerrero
- Nathanael León - Monje
- Carlos Pouliot - Amante de Justa Méndez
- Cecilia Leger
- Juan José Martínez Casado - Carcelero
- Rodolfo Velez - Cocinero
- Luz Elena Silva
- Ramón Menéndez - Manuel de Lucena
