= Manuel Carpio =

Mexican poet

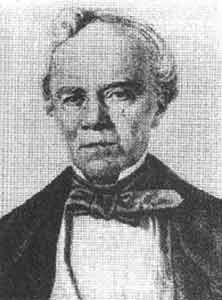
- Photograph
- Born: Manuel Elogio Carpio Hernández; March 1, 1791; Cosamaloapan de Carpio, Veracruz, Mexico
- Died: February 11, 1860 (aged 68); Mexico City, Mexico
- Occupations: Poet; theologian; physician; politician

Manuel Elogio Carpio Hernández (March 1, 1791 – February 11, 1860) was a Mexican poet, theologian, physician, and politician. Much of his poetry was religious or historical, with an inspiration for his poetry deriving from the Bible. He was a classicist who often used Romanticism. He wrote the earliest known literary depiction of the ghost La Llorona in a poem in 1849 and has received praise for his work.

== Personal life ==
Carpio was born in Cosamaloapan de Carpio, Veracruz, Mexico, on March 1, 1791. As a child, he moved with his parents to Puebla which is where his father died and they lost their wealth. He studied Latin, philosophy, and theology at the Conciliar Seminary in Puebla. He enjoyed reading Greek classics, Roman classics, religious books, and books about ancient history in the library. Carpio completed his schooling in medicine at the National Autonomous University of Mexico in 1832. He died in Mexico City on February 11, 1860.

== Career ==
Carpio translated Aphorisms and Prognostics by Hippocrates. He was a teacher, writer, physician, and a member of learned societies. He was a part of the Legislature of Veracruz and was a representative in the Congress of the Union. Carpio was briefly the President of the Chamber of Deputies.

Although Carpio was known for his poetry, his first poems were not published until 1849. Carpio's inspiration for his poetry was the Bible, with the majority of his poems being either religious or historical. He was a classicist who often used Romanticism. His poems include Mexico, El Popocatépetl, Belshazzar's Feast, The Witch of Endor, The Annunciation, The Virgin at the Foot of the Cross, and Napolean in the Red Sea. Carpio wrote the earliest known literary depiction of the ghost La Llorona as a poem in 1849. In Carpio's 14-line poem, a woman named Rosalia was murdered by her husband and becomes a weeping ghost that travels through streets and the riverbank, wearing a cloak.

== Reception ==
In 1922, The New International Encyclopedia referred to Carpio as the "most popular Mexican poet of the century", and named Belshazzar's Feast his most important work. The Encyclopedia Americana said that Carpio is the "first and best epic poet of his country and his lyrics have true lyrical swing." History of Mexican Literature stated that Napoleon in the Red Sea is the "most pleasing" of Carpio's historical poetry and that Carpio was "respected and beloved by all".
