= The Woman of the Port (1949 film) =

- Directed by: Emilio Gómez Muriel
- Written by: Arcady Boytler (story); Jesús Cárdenas; Emilio Gómez Muriel
- Produced by: Óscar J. Brooks
- Starring: María Antonieta Pons; Víctor Junco; Arturo Soto Rangel
- Cinematography: Raúl Martínez Solares
- Edited by: José W. Bustos
- Music by: Manuel Esperón
- Production company: Producciones Brooks
- Release date: 7 November 1949
- Running time: 90 minutes
- Country: Mexico
- Language: Spanish

The Woman of the Port (Spanish: La mujer del puerto) is a 1949 Mexican drama film directed and co-written by Emilio Gómez Muriel and starring María Antonieta Pons, Víctor Junco and Arturo Soto Rangel. It is a remake of the 1934 film of the same title.

The film's sets were designed by the art director Jesús Bracho.

== Main cast ==
- María Antonieta Pons as Rosario / Carolina Méndez
- Víctor Junco as Alberto Méndez
- Arturo Soto Rangel as Don Antonio Méndez
- Eduardo Egea as Julián
- Pascual García Peña as Don Fernando
- Arturo Martínez as Marcelo
- Eduardo Noriega as Carlos
- Lupe Carriles as Vecina
- Irma Dorantes as Chica en carnaval

== Bibliography ==
- Emilio García Riera. Historia documental del cine mexicano: 1949-1950. Universidad de Guadalajara, 1992.
