= Cruel Destiny =

1944 film

- Directed by: Juan Orol
- Written by: Juan Orol
- Produced by: Juan Orol
- Starring: María Antonieta Pons; Juan José Martínez Casado; Florencio Castelló
- Cinematography: Ross Fisher
- Edited by: Alfredo Rosas Priego
- Music by: Chucho Monge
- Production company: España Sono Films
- Release date: 23 August 1944
- Running time: 106 minutes
- Country: Mexico
- Language: Spanish

Cruel Destiny (Spanish: Cruel destino) is a 1944 Mexican musical drama film directed by Juan Orol and starring María Antonieta Pons, Juan José Martínez Casado and Florencio Castelló. The film's sets were designed by the art director Ramón Rodríguez Granada. It is part of the tradition of Rumberas films, popular during the Golden Age of Mexican Cinema.

== Synopsis ==
Since childhood Alice and Armando have dreamed of a future together. However when they reach adulthood he objects to her becoming a dancer in a cabaret, leading her to fall into the clutches of another man.

== Cast ==
- María Antonieta Pons as Alice
- Juan José Martínez Casado as Armando
- Florencio Castelló
- José Eduardo Pérez
- Carolina Barret
- Manuel Noriega
- José Pulido
- Jorge Arriaga
- Guillermo Familiar
- Gilberto González
- Raúl Guerrero
- Chel López
- Kiko Mendive
- Joaquín Roche

== Bibliography ==
- Alfaro, Eduardo de la Vega. Juan Orol. Universidad de Guadalajara, 1987.
- Riera, Emilio García. Historia documental del cine mexicano: 1943-1945. Universidad de Guadalajara, 1992.
