= List of works by Gloria Anzaldúa =

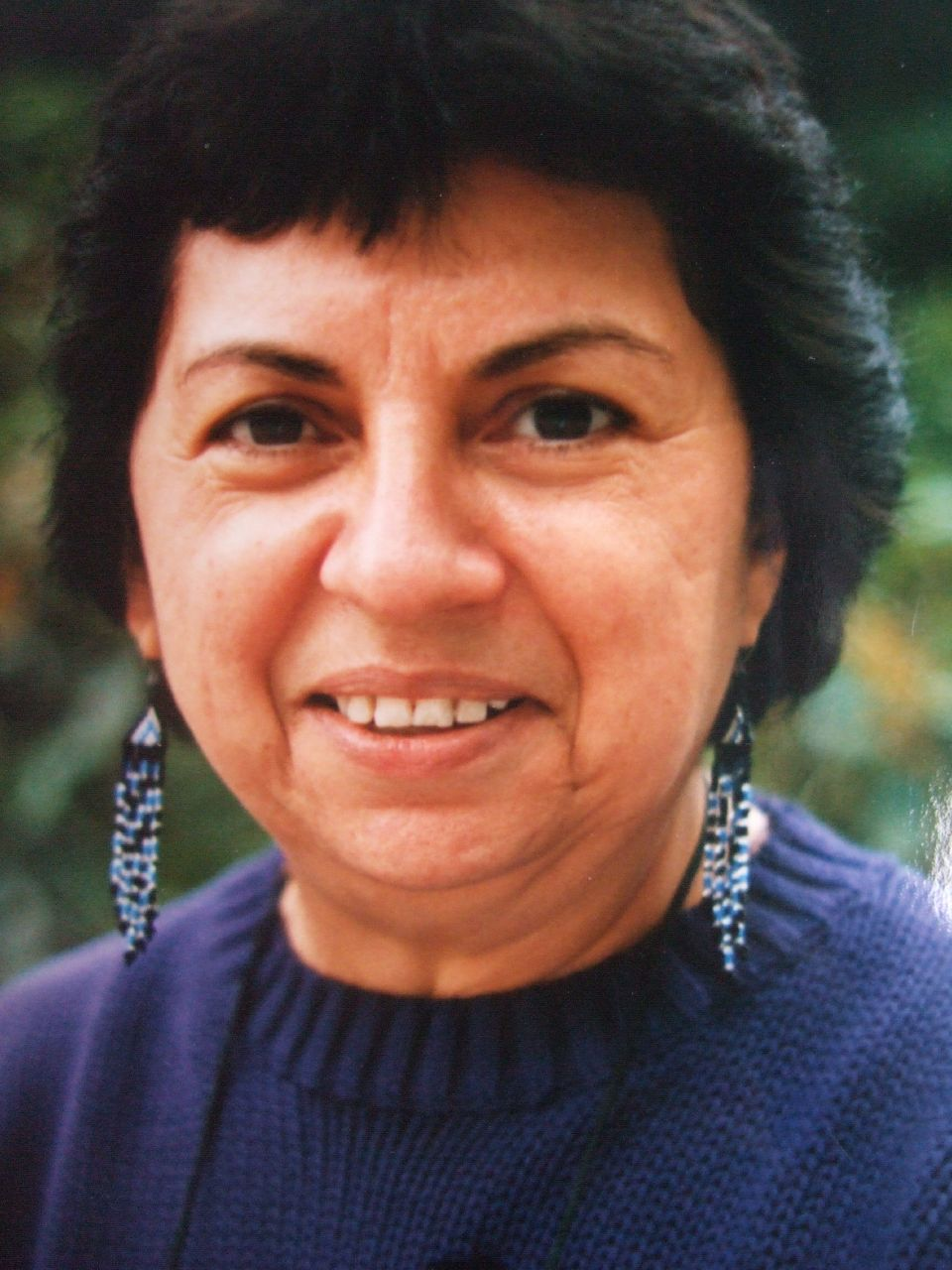
Gloria E. Anzaldúa in 1990

Gloria Anzaldúa (1942–2004) was a prolific Chicana writer of prose, fiction, and poetry. After moving from her native Texas to California in 1977, she exclusively focused on her writing, publishing dozens of pieces of writing before her death. She left behind several manuscripts in progress when she died.

Among her most popular pieces of writing are This Bridge Called My Back: Writings by Radical Women of Color (1981) and Borderlands / La Frontera: The New Mestiza (1987; especially a section entitled "La conciencia de la mestiza/Towards a Mestiza Consciousness"). She wrote variously about feminism, the role of women of color in feminism, self-reflection, borderlands (particularly the space around the Mexico–United States border), Indigenous mythology and culture, and identity and contradiction. She developed the framework of mestiza consciousness, contributed to the field of queer theory, and valued intersectionality over single-identity movements. She is remembered as an especially influential writer in late nineteenth century cultural studies.

== Books ==
Books written by Gloria E. Anzaldúa
Title	Year	Publisher	Notes	Ref.
This Bridge Called My Back: Writings By Radical Women of Color	1981	Persephone Press	Edited collection with Cherríe Moraga	
Borderlands / La Frontera: The New Mestiza	1987	Aunt Lute Books	A text that exists within several genres	
Making Face, Making Soul / Hacienda Caras: Creative and Critical Perspectives by Women of Color	1990	Aunt Lute Books	Edited collection	
Interviews/Entrellistas	2000	Routledge	Edited by AnaLouise Keating	
this bridge we call home: radical visions for transformation	2002	Routledge	Edited with AnaLouise Keating	
Light in the Dark / Luz en lo Oscuro: Rewriting Identity, Spirituality, Reality	2015	Duke University Press	Published after her death	
La Serpiente Que Se Come Su Cola: The Death and Rebirth Rites-of-Passage of a Chicana Lesbian	—	—	Never published	
La Prieta	—	—	Never published, intended to be a "novel/collection of stories"	

== Articles and essays ==
Articles and essays written by Gloria E. Anzaldúa
Title	Year	Publication	Notes	Ref.
"Speaking in Tongues: A Letter to Third World Women Writers"	1981	This Bridge Called My Back: Writings by Radical Women of Color	Written in the epistolary format	
"La Prieta"	1981	This Bridge Called My Back: Writings by Radical Women of Color	Anzaldúa began writing this essay in 1979 and finished it in 1981. An autohistoria	
"En Rapport, In Opposition: Cobrando cuentas a las nuestras"	1987	Sinister Wisdom	—	
"Bridge, Drawbridge, Sandbar, or Island: Lesbians-of-Color Hacienda Alianzas"	1990	Bridges of Power: Women's Multicultural Alliances	A longer version of a 1988 speech	
"Metaphors in the Tradition of the Shaman"	1990	Conversant Essays: Contemporary Poets on Poetry	—	
"To(o) Queer the Writer – Loca, escritora y chicana"	1991	Inversions: Writing by Dykes, Queers, and Lesbians	An edited transcript	
"Border Arte: Nepantla, el Lugar de la Frontera"	1993	La Frontera/The Border: Art about the Mexico/United States Border Experience	Discussion of Coyolxauhqui, autohistoria, nepantla, and the visual arts	
"Foreword"	1996	Cassell's Encyclopedia of Queer Myth, Symbol and Spirit	Discusses spirituality. Worked on a longer version until her death	
"Let us be the healing of the wound: The Coyolxauhqui imperative – la sombra y el sueño"	2005	One Wound for Another / Una Herida por otra: Testimonios de Latin@s in the U.S. through Cyberspace (11 de septiembre de 2001 – 11 de marzo de 2002)	Final essay published before her death, about post-September 11th policy and nepantla	
"Born Under the Sign of the Flower: Los jotos in Ancient Mexico and Modern Aztlán"	—	—	Unpublished essay, written in the 1980s about the HIV/AIDS pandemic	
"S.I.C.: Spiritual Identity Crisis"	—	—	Unpublished essay, written before 1999 about her diabetes diagnosis	
"Spiritual Activism: Making Altares, Making Connections"	—	—	Unpublished essay, written before 1999 about the HIV/AIDS pandemic	

== Fiction ==
Short stories by Gloria E. Anzaldúa
Title	Year	Publication	Notes	Ref.
"El Paisano is a Bird of Good Omen"	1982/1983	Conditions and Cuentos: Stories by Latinas	Began writing in 1974 as "La Boda" and conceptualized in the early 1980s as a sequence in a novel. Prietita story	
"People Should Not Die in June in South Texas"	1985/1993	My Story's On: Ordinary Women, Extraordinary Lives and Growing Up Latino: Reflections on Life in the United States	Prietita story	
"La historia de una marimacha"	1989	Third Woman Press	—	
"Life Line"	1989	Lesbian Love Stories, vol. 1	—	
"She Ate Horses"	1990	Lesbian Philosophies and Cultures	—	
"Ms. Right, My True Love, My Soul Mate"	1991	Lesbian Love Stories, vol. 2	—	
"Ghost Trap / Trampa de espanto"	1992	New Chicana/Chicano Writing	First written in 1990. Included in La Prieta. Humorous story	
"Puddles"	1992	New Chicana/Chicano Writing	Published in 1992, revised until at least 1998. Some of the revisions were substantial, including changing the point of view and the title (to "Velada de una lagartija")	
"Swallowing Fireflies / Tragando Luciérnagas"	2003	Telling Moments: Autobiographical Lesbian Short Stories	—	

All of her children's books, and many of her short stories for children, feature Prieta/Prietita (Note: Prieta means 'the dark one' and Prietita means 'the little dark one'. Anzaldúa was referred to by these names and reclaimed them in her fiction.) as the main character. Most of the Prietita stories remain unpublished, as do many stories about childhood or written for children. She wrote for stories for Mexican-American children to challenge the feelings of inferiority they learned in school as a project of "decolonizing, disindoctrinating ourselves from the oppressive messages we have been given".

Children's books by Gloria E. Anzaldúa
Title	Year	Publisher	Notes	Ref.
Friends from the Other Side / Amigos del Otro Lado	1993	Children's Book Press	Illustrated, bilingual	
Prietita and the Ghost Woman / Prietita y la Llorona	1995	Children's Book Press	Inverts the traditional reading of la Llorona as fearful	

== Poems ==
Anzaldúa included poems in her other writing, including her book Borderlands / La Frontera. Scholar Ariana Vigil characterizes the poetry of Anzaldúa as a site of "necessary social critique", drawing upon her experiences that are "linked to a raced, working-class condition and subject".

Poems by Gloria E. Anzaldúa
Title	Year	Publication	Notes	Ref.
"Tihueque"	1976	Tejidos	Her first publication. Tihueque is Nahuatl for "now let us go".	
"To Delia, Who Failed on Principles"	2009	The Gloria E. Anzaldúa Reader	Written in 1974, published posthumously	
"Reincarnation"	2009	The Gloria E. Anzaldúa Reader	Written in 1974, published posthumously	
"I Want to be Shocked Shitless"	2009	The Gloria E. Anzaldúa Reader	Written in 1974, published posthumously	
"The Occupant"	2009	The Gloria E. Anzaldúa Reader	Written around 1975, performed often in the 1980s; published posthumously	
"The New Speaker"	2009	The Gloria E. Anzaldúa Reader	Written in the 1970s, published posthumously	
"The coming of el mundo surdo"	2009	The Gloria E. Anzaldúa Reader	Written in 1977. Surdo is usually spelled zurdo, but Anzaldúa altered the spelling; published posthumously	
"Enemy of the State"	2009	The Gloria E. Anzaldúa Reader	Included in the 1985 version of Borderlands / La Frontera but not the published version; published posthumously	
"Del Otro Lado"	2009	The Gloria E. Anzaldúa Reader	Included in the 1985 version of Borderlands / La Frontera but not the published version; published posthumously	
"Encountering the Medusa"	2009	The Gloria E. Anzaldúa Reader	Included in the 1985 version of Borderlands / La Frontera but not the published version; published posthumously	
"The Presence"	2009	The Gloria E. Anzaldúa Reader	Written between 1984 and 1990, published posthumously	
"La vulva es una herida abierta / The vulva is an open wound"	2009	The Gloria E. Anzaldúa Reader	Written around 1990, published posthumously. Autobiographical poem	
"Yemayá"	2009	The Gloria E. Anzaldúa Reader	Written before 1991, published posthumously. Discusses the Yoruban goddess Yemayá	
"How to"	2009	The Gloria E. Anzaldúa Reader	Written and revised until 1997, published posthumously	
"Healing Wounds"	2009	The Gloria E. Anzaldúa Reader	Written and revised until 2002, published posthumously	
"Like a spider in her web"	2009	The Gloria E. Anzaldúa Reader	Written and revised until 2002, published posthumously	
"The Postmodern Llorona"	2009	The Gloria E. Anzaldúa Reader	Written and revised until 2003, published posthumously	
"Llorona Coyolxauhqui"	2009	The Gloria E. Anzaldúa Reader	Written and revised until 2003, published posthumously. Discusses la Llorona, Coyolxauhqui, nepantla, and el cenote	
"When I write I hover"	2009	The Gloria E. Anzaldúa Reader	Prose poem, published posthumously	

== Notes and references ==
=== Works cited ===
- Gutierrez-Perez, Robert (2017). "Anzaldúa, Gloria E. Light in the Dark/Luz en lo Oscuro: Rewriting Identity, Spirituality, Reality". Women's Studies in Communication. 40 (3): 306–308. doi:10.1080/07491409.2017.1334446. S2CID 149070380.
- Keating, AnaLouise, ed. (2005). EntreMundos/AmongWorlds: New perspectives on Gloria E. Anzaldúa. Palgrave Macmillan. ISBN 9781403977137.
  - Blanchard, Mary Loving. "Reclaiming pleasure: Reading the body in 'People Should Not Die in June in South Texas'". In Keating (2005).
  - Vásquez, Edith M. "La gloriosa travesura de la musa que cruza / the misbehaving glory(a) of the border-crossing muse: Transgression in Anzaldúa's children's stories". In Keating (2005).
- Hey-Colon, Rebeca L. (2022). "Chronic illness and transformation in Gloria Anzaldúa's "Puddles"". Aztlán. 47 (1): 15–42.
- Keating, AnaLouise, ed. (2009). The Gloria E. Anzaldúa reader. Duke University Press.
- Lunsford, Andrea A. (1998). "Toward a mestiza rhetoric: Gloria Anzaldúa on composition and postcoloniality". JAC. 18 (1): 1–27. JSTOR 20866168.
- Millán, Isabel (2015). "Contested children's literature: Que(e)ries into Chicana and Central American autofantasías". Signs. 41 (1): 199–244. doi:10.1086/681919. hdl:2097/32551. JSTOR 10.1086/681919. S2CID 147670637.
- Perez, Domino Renee (2022). Fatherhood in the borderlands: A daughter's slow approach. University of Texas Press. ISBN 9781477326350.
- Rebolledo, Tey Diana (2006). "Prietita y el otro lado: Gloria Anzaldúa's literature for children". PMLA. 121 (1): 279–284. JSTOR 25486306.
- Vigil, Ariana (2016). "Heterosexualization and the state: The poetry of Gloria Anzaldúa". Chicana/Latina Studies. 16 (1): 86–109. JSTOR 45186447.
- Woodward, Carolyn (1989). "Borderlands/La Frontera: The New Mestiza by Gloria Anzaldúa". NWSA Journal. 1 (3): 530–532. JSTOR 4315935.
