= Coyolxauhqui imperative =

Theory named after the Aztec goddess of the moon

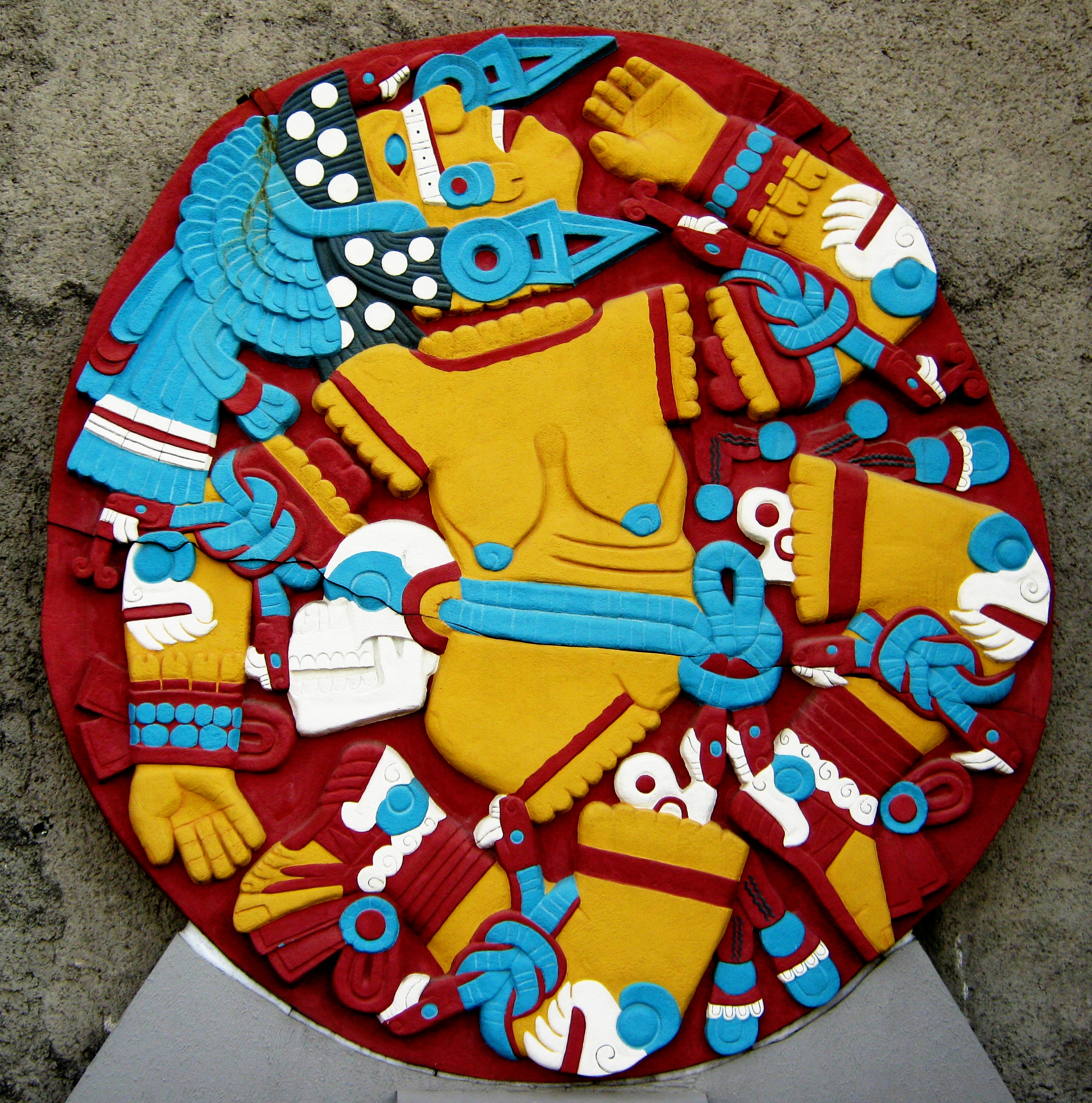
The Coyolxāuhqui stone that laid at the base of Huēyi Teōcalli (Temple Mayor) in Tenochtitlan, which is a replica of the original mountain of Coatepec. The stone depicts her dismembered and fragmented body.

The Coyolxauhqui imperative is a theory named after the Aztec goddess of the moon Coyolxauhqui to explain an ongoing and lifelong process of healing from events which fragment, dismember, or deeply wound the self spiritually, emotionally, and psychologically. The imperative is the need to look at the wounds, understand how the self has been fragmented, and then reconstruct or remake the self in a new way. Repeatedly enacting this process is done in the search for wholeness or integration. The concept was developed by queer Chicana feminist Gloria E. Anzaldúa.

Scholars have applied her theory in varying contexts, such as in the need for educational institutions to recognize their responsibility to serving marginalized students; to look at the wounds they have caused so that they can reconstruct themselves in ways which promote holistic healing for students of color. The theory has also been applied in regard to identity, by uncovering aspects of the self that have been buried as a result of colonialism, and then reconstructing the self by looking at the complexity of the wounds and recognizing the fluidity and interconnectedness of the whole. The theory is recognized as one of Anzaldúa's central contributions to Chicana feminist theory, along with Nepantla, spiritual activism, and new tribalism.

== Term ==
The theory is named after Coyolxauhqui, who is an important figure in Aztec belief. Coyolxauhqui, the eldest daughter of Coatlicue, decides to kill her mother after being embarrassed from hearing of her sudden pregnancy of Huitzilopochtli. As Coyolxauhqui prepares for battle at the base of the mountain of Coatepec (the current site of which is unknown), in collaboration with Coatlicue's other children (Centzon Huitznahuas), one of the children, Quauitlicac, warns Huitzilopochtli of the incoming attack while in utero. Now aware of the attack, Coatlicue miraculously births Huitzilopochtli, who is fully grown and comes out of the womb wielding "his shield, teueuelli, and his darts and his blue dart thrower, called xinatlatl."

After she is beheaded by Huitzilopochtli, her body is dismembered as it falls down the mountain: "He pierced Coyolxauhqui, and then quickly struck off her head. It stopped there at the edge of Coatepetl. And her body came falling below; it fell breaking to pieces; in various places her arms, her legs, her body each fell." In some accounts of the story, Huitzilopochtli tosses Coyolxauhqui's head into the sky and it became the Moon in order to comfort his mother so that she could see her daughter in the sky during the night. Anzaldúa similarly draws on these accounts, referring to Coyolxauhqui as the Moon.

== Process ==
Anzaldúa describes the theory in her writing as follows:

The Coyolxauhqui imperative is to heal and achieve integration. When fragmentations occur you fall apart and feel as though you've been expelled from paradise. Coyolxauhqui is my symbol for the necessary process of dismemberment and fragmentation, of seeing that self or the situations you're embroiled in differently. It is also my symbol for reconstruction and reframing, one that allows for putting the pieces together in a new way. The Coyolxauhqui imperative is an ongoing process of making and unmaking. There is never any resolution, just the process of healing. the path of the artist, the creative impulse, what I call the Coyolxauhqui imperative, is basically an attempt to heal the wounds. It's a search for inner completeness... after being split, dismembered, or torn apart la persona has to pull herself together, re-member and reconstruct herself on another level.

Anzaldúa states that the individual must imagine or reenact their own trauma in order to re-member themselves in a new form. Through this process of reenacting one's traumas, a healing process of rebirth or reconstruction can be enacted and completed. Anzaldúa warns that the easier path of desconocimiento, or, "leads human consciousness into ignorance fear and hatred" and only results in more trauma, pain, and violence. The more difficult path of conocimiento, "leads to awakening, insights, understandings, realizations, and courage," while bridging gaps across the abyss that self-righteousness creates. Anzaldúa recognizes that only a very small minority of people will choose the more difficult path of conocimiento, yet states that this is to be expected and is not something to becomes hopeless over:

Though only a small percent of the world's six billion people have achieved a high level of awareness, the collective consciousness of these people has the power to counterbalance the negativity of the rest of humanity. Ultimately each of us has the potential to change the sentience of the world. In addition to community-building we can transform our world be imaging it differently, dreaming it passionately via all our senses, and willing it into creation.

She concludes by stating that through this change which begins on an individual level, communal change and eventually global change is possible: "by bringing psychological understanding and using spiritual approaches in political activism we can stop the destruction of our moral, compassionate humanity. Empowered, we'll be motivated to organize, achieve justice, and begin to heal the world."

== Example ==
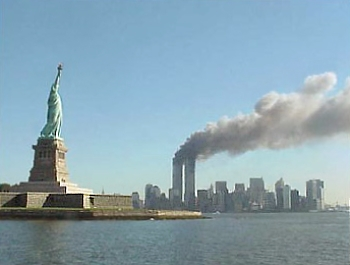
September 11 attacks in New York City. View of the World Trade Center and the Statue of Liberty. (2001)

The Coyolxauhqui imperative is described by Anzaldúa in the context of the wounding that observing the events of 9/11 caused her. As she states in her article "Let Us Be the Healing Of the Wound," Anzaldúa witnessed the Twin Towers falling and stated

Each violent image of the towers collapsing, transmitted live all over the world then repeated a thousand times on TV, sucked the breath out of me, each image etched on my mind's eye. Wounded I fell into shock, cold and clammy. The moment fragmented me, dissociating me from myself... Bodies on fire, bodies falling through the sky, bodies pummeled and crushed by stone and steel, los cuerpos trapped and suffocating became our bodies.

Anzaldúa states that this event instilled susto into her, which suspended her "in limbo in that in-between space, nepantla." In this in-between space, Anzaldúa records:

I wandered through my days on autopilot, feeling disconnected from the events of my life... Like la Llorona lost and alone, I was arrested in susto, helplessness, falling, sinking. Swamped with sadness, I mourned all the dead, counted our losses, reflected on the part our country played in the tragedy and how I was personally responsible. It was difficult to acknowledge, much less express, the depth of my feelings–instead me lo tragué.

Following this suspension in susto, disassociation and depression, Anzaldúa states that there is a need to move through this trauma and the sorrow it creates "into another state of mind." Anzaldúa records that the byproducts of this trauma can manifest into "shadow beasts (desconocimientos): numbness, anger, and disillusionment" and states that "we always inherit the past problems of family, community, and nation." As a result, Anzaldúa records seeking out a renewed self:

I stare up at the moon, Coyolxauhqui, and its light in the darkness. I seek a healing image, one that re-connected me to others. I seek the positive shadow that I've also inherited. With the imperative to 'speak' esta herida abierta (this open wound) before it drowns all voices, the feelings I'd buried begin unfurling. Vulnerable once more I'm clawed by the talons of grief.

Anzaldúa states that from this wounded place it is difficult to speak from the open wound and make sense of the trauma in order to "pull the pieces of my life back together." Anzaldúa suggests that this can be done through spiritual activism, "I yearn to pass on to the next generation the spiritual activism I've inherited from my cultures. If I object to my government's act of war I cannot remain silent. To do so is to be complicitous. But sadly we are all accomplices." As an artist, Anzaldúa states that her responsibility is

to bear witness to what haunts us, to step back and attempt to see the pattern in these events (personal and societal), and how we can repair el daño (the damage) by using the imagination and its visions. I believe in the transformative power and medicine of art. As I see it, this country's real battle is with its shadow–its racism, propensity for violence, rapacity for consuming, neglect of its responsibility to global communities and the environment, and unjust treatment of dissenters and the disenfranchised, especially people of color. As an artist, I feel compelled to expose this shadow side which the mainstream media and government denies. In order to understand our complicity and responsibility we must look at the shadow.

Anzaldúa thus suggests that the process of re-membering the self is done through looking at the shadow the wound has created, both in the personal and national sense, since both are inherently connected. As an artist, she concludes that looking at the shadows of the wound is the pathway towards healing. In this example, although the event of witnessing 9/11 inflicted personal trauma on Anzaldúa, she acknowledges that the healing process from this trauma involves spiritual activism which extends beyond herself. The Coyolxauhqui process has therefore been referred to in simultaneously personal, communal, national, and global terms.
