= Latino children's literature =

Latino children's literature encompasses works such as stories, books, and poems about Latinos in the United States, often touching on the Latino cultural experience in the U.S. This includes people of Latin American heritage born in the United States, including Puerto Rico, or those who have immigrated from Latin America, with the term encompassing their contributions to the field of writing for children in the United States. These works are oftentimes written in English but can include works written in Spanish or a mix of both languages.

Latino children's literature has had a long history in the United States and the Americas but did not gain popularity until the 1960s and 1970s, coinciding with the rise of the Chicano movement and a new focus on multiculturalism by Latino authors. Since then there have been multiple awards created to recognize notable works and influential authors of Latino children's literature.

Thematically, Latino children's literature often touches upon many topics including identity and immigration and follow the styles of oral traditions, folklore, and memoirs, oftentimes incorporating Spanish vernacular or phrases.

== History ==
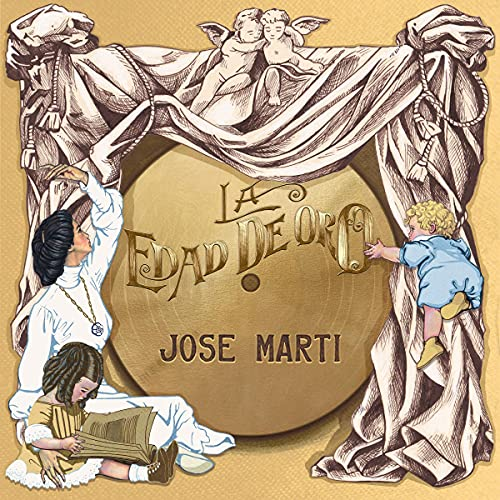
Cover of La Edad de Oro by José Marti

Latino children's literature gained much popularity in the 1990s, however its beginnings can be traced all the way back to the 19th century. During this time period, Spanish-language newspapers circulated throughout the United States with the inclusion of different stories and poems Another notable contribution to this subgenre's beginnings, is one made by Father Felix Varela, who published a Spanish magazine which included religious texts for children. More prominently, in 1898, a magazine entitled La Edad de Oro or The Golden Age, was published and written by Cuban poet José Marti for children in the Americas. It is recognized as the beginning of Latin American children's literature. Beyond written pieces of literature, many of the Spanish speaking settlers who lived west of the Mississippi, as well as Spanish settlers in what is now Florida, brought with them a deep oral literature that only grew as their children were born in the United States.

Later in the century during the 1960s to early 1970s, Latino children's literature became popular alongside the Chicano movement, which embodied social issues, peace, and education. Pura Belpré, a Puerto Rican librarian in New York wrote many children's books in the 60s based on Puerto Rican Folklore. One of the books she wrote was Perez y Martina, a Portican folktale about a beautiful cockroach named Martina and her "gallant" suitor, a mouse named Perez. Another example of this revitalization is the Colecćion Mini-libros, published in the early 1970s in English and Spanish, with bilingual versions as well, by Mexican-American author Ernesto Galarza. The collection included Mother Goose rhymes that took place in the Rio Grande.

By the 1980s, The Council on Interracial Books for Children found that non-Latino authors, who wrote most Chicano books at the time, upheld white racial biases in their books and usually exoticized Latin America. After this report, more Latino authors started to emerge, coinciding with a rise in the Latino population in the United States. However, the amount of Latino children books actually published stayed very low, which Ruth Quiroa argues in Diversity in Youth Literature was a result of conservative politics in the 1980s.

Latino children's literature gained additional recognition during the 1990s when author Alma Flor Ada launched a book series that explored these messages of identity. During this time the Americas and Pura Belpré Awards were introduced to recognize outstanding pieces of Latino children's literature.

Currently, the amount of books that fall into the category of Latino children's literature are small, which Sally Nathenson-Mejía and Kathy Escamilla have described as indicative of ethnic children's literature as a whole. However, data from the Cooperative Children's Book Center (CCBC) at the University of Wisconsin-Madison shows that in 1994 there were only 90 children's books published by and about Latino people as opposed to 371 by and 237 about Latinos in 2022. Within the last few years, there has been a push for more inclusive books within education. Due to increasing number of the Latinos within the United States, many articles have promoted the importance of including Latino literature in the classroom. This allows for Latino children to see themselves in the literature discussed within schools, as well as promotion of a more inclusive learning environment and equity in the classroom.

== Subject matter ==
Within Latino children's literature, there are a few big topic areas that tend to show up in many books. Big topic areas covered within these books are immigration, identity/cultural, the notion of English being a privilege, and gender roles. Focusing on immigration, many books written on this topic cover ideas of identity, deportation, and assimilation. Along these same lines, books also mention wishes to fulfill the American dream. The topics and ideas that come from books about immigration are relatable to many Latino children, as many of them have either experience immigration themselves or have parents that are immigrants.

Identity and culture are big ideas that also come up in many books. Latino authors and illustrators are known to create more authentic depictions of subcultures without generating stereotypes. When Latino authors write books based on their own experiences, they are able to give a more accurate picture of the experiences their own subcultures goes through. Moving towards the message of English being seen as privilege, a lot books written today within this subgenre are written in English. This sends the message that is more significant in comparison to English since it is generally the preferred language that books seem to be written in. One article states that "it is important to consider how language is privileged in the books and how it advantages some and disadvantages others".

Latino children's literature has had themes that have been identified by some scholars as problematic. This can be seen with the presentation of gender where Latinas are largely portrayed as domestic workers and as less competent. This is also seen in the imagery of Latin America as poor and unwelcoming, with descriptions of the region full of racial stereotypes. This negative depiction is also given to urban barrios which are treated as dangerous and poverty-ridden.

== Style ==
Latino children's literature encompasses a diverse array of stylistic choices such as the usage of metaphors, similes expressed through riddles, proverbs/sayings, tongue twisters, and nursery rhymes. Poetry is also a common practice. In order to bring authenticity to the text authors will sometimes include Spanish or Chicano vernacular and phrases, or offer a completely bilingual version of a story, a stylistic choice that is very specific to this body of literature. Adult Latino literature is known for the magical realism that is popular among Latino writers, and this style is imbued in the oral traditions and folklore that make up Latino children's literature. In addition to magical realism, memoirs are part of the Latino body of work that is incorporated into children's literature, with Sandra Cisneros' The House on Mango Street being a prime example of this.

== Awards ==
- Pura Belpre Award
  - The Pura Belpré Award is given to a Latino/a author and illustrator whose work best portrays, affirms, and celebrates the Latino cultural experience for children and youth. For a book to be considered for this award, it must have been published in the United States during the preceding year, the author/illustrator must be a citizen or resident of the U.S. or Puerto Rico, and may be published in English, Spanish, or be a bilingual/dual-language text.
- Américas Award
  - The Consortium of Latin American Studies Programs (CLASP) founded the Américas Award in 1993. It was created an effort to recognize authors, illustrators and publishers that have produced quality children's and young adult books that portray Latin America, the Caribbean, and/or Latinos in the United States. Criteria for the award include publication the year prior to being considered, the book must be in English, Spanish, Portuguese, or an indigenous language, and the book must have been published in the United States.
- Tomás Rivera Mexican American Children's Book Award
  - The Tomás Rivera Mexican American Children's Book Award was created in 1995 to recognize authors and illustrators whose works portray the authentic Mexican American experience. Named after distinguished alumnus and educator Dr. Tomás Rivera, the award includes two categories–works for younger readers (ages 0 to 12) and works for older readers (ages 13–18). Criteria for the award focuses specifically on authentic, positive portrayals of the Mexican American experience, and books must have been published no more than two years prior for consideration.
- Alma Flor Ada Award
  - The Alma Flor Ada Award was created in 2021 out of the Virtual Center for Bilingual and Bicultural Books for Children and Young Adults (VCB3) at San Diego State University. Each year, the VCB3, recognizes a classic book which has made a significant impression and contribution to the Latino youth community in the United States. Starting in 2023, the award will also be recognizing two new and contemporary bilingual and bicultural children's, middle grade and young adult books.

== Notable authors ==
- Alma Flor Ada
- Pat Mora
- Sandra Cisneros
- Gary Soto
- Nicholasa Mohr
- Piri Thomas
- Hilda Perera
- Lucia M. Gonzales
- Leila Torres
- Omar Castaneda
- Roberto G. Fernandez
- Erika L. Sanchez
- Ana Maria Machado
- Nicholasa Mohr
- Pam Muñoz Ryan

== Notable works ==
Notable books include:

- Friends from the Other Side / Amigos del Otro Lado (1993) by Gloria E. Anzaldúa and illustrated by Consuelo Méndez Castillo
- Cuadros de familia/Family Pictures (1990) by Carmen Lomas Garza
- I Am Not Your Perfect Mexican Daughter (2017) by Erika L. Sanchez
- Out of Darkness (2015) by Ashley Hope Perez
- The House on Mango Street (1984) by Sandra Cisneros
- How the García Girls Lost their Accent (1991) by Julia Alvarez
- In the Time of the Butterflies by Julia Alvarez
- Barrio Boy (1971) by Ernesto Galarza
- Where the Flame Trees Bloom (1994) by Alma Flor Ada
- Too Many Tamales (1993) by Gary Soto
- Child of the Flower-Song People (2021) by Gloria Amescua and illustrated by Duncan Tonatiuh
- My Two Border Towns (2021) by David Bowles and illustrated by Erika Meza
- Efrén Divided (2021) by Ernesto Cisneros
- Me in the Middle by Ana Maria Machado
- Going Home by Nicholasa Mohr
- Raining Backwards by Roberto Fernandez
- Esperanza Rising by Pam Muñoz Ryan
