= Friends from the Other Side / Amigos del Otro Lado =

Latino children's book by Gloria E. Anzaldúa

- Author: Gloria E. Anzaldúa
- Illustrator: Consuelo Méndez Castillo
- Publication date: March 1, 1993
- ISBN: 978-0-51680113-1

Friends from the Other Side / Amigos del Otro Lado (1993) is a bilingual (Spanish/English) Latino children's book written by Mexican American/Chicana scholar Gloria E. Anzaldúa and illustrated by Consuelo Méndez Castillo. It is loosely based on Anzaldúa's early life in South Texas and tells the story of a young Chicana girl, Prietita, living near the US-Mexican border who befriends and helps a young Mexican boy, Joaquín, who has recently immigrated.

== Context and themes ==
In the United States in the 1990s there was a rise in bilingual books for children and young adults which began with the publication of translated stories originally written in English, but then an increase in books that "deal with young people's questions about living in two cultures simultaneously and the process of developing a personal identity in that situation." Taran C. Johnston included Friends from the Other Side/ Amigos del Otro Lado in an article he wrote on transculturation (which describe the phenomenon of merging and converging cultures) in bilingual children's literature as a form of resistance literature. In publishing bilingual children's books that combine two cultures in a process of transculturation and telling the stories of marginalized groups, these books may be seen as resistance to the dominant culture. According to Johnston, "...children's stories are frequently the channel through which an imperial power exerts its cultural influence."

Frances Ann Day, in Latina and Latino Voices in Literature: Lives and Works discusses several issues which are raised in Friends from the Other Side/ Amigos del Otro Lado. These include the poverty that Joaquín and his mother experience, the creation of the protagonist as a courageous, strong, young Latina girl, which challenges the dominant stereotypes often imposed on Latinas, and bullying - "By Prietita's example, the reader learns how to resist peer pressure and take a stand against prejudice and cruelty."

== Story and pictures ==
=== Opening pages ===
The title page illustration portrays a barren yard outside a small shack in the desert where laundry hangs to dry on a line and animals roam with no fence. The next page is illustrated with a desert scene with plants and animals. The text, written in English on one page and Spanish on the facing page, is an introduction by Anzaldúa.

In English it reads: "I grew up in South Texas, close to the Rio Grande river which is the Mexican-U.S. border. When I was a young girl, I saw many women and children who had crossed to this side to get work because there was none in Mexico. Many of them got wet while crossing the river, so some people on this side who didn't like them called them 'wetbacks' or 'mojados.' This is the story of Prietita, a brave young Mexican American girl, and her new friend Joaquin, a Mexican boy from the other side of the river." -Gloria Anzaldúa

=== Summary ===
The protagonist, a young girl called Prietita, is playing in her yard when a boy, Joaquín, walks by selling firewood. The two begin to talk and she notices that the Spanish he speaks is different from what she speaks. She asks if he is from the other side of the river. She also notices that his clothes are dirty and worn and he has sores on his arms. She thinks about bringing him to the curandera, an herbalist who heals people. But when she sees his sores, Joaquín feels embarrassed and hurries away.

Later she hears a commotion and on investigation comes across her cousin and his friends yelling at Joaquín and calling him racist names. Prietita protects him from the other boys. She then goes with Joaquin to his home where she meets his mother who talks about crossing the border in search of work and finding the same problems on the U.S. side. Prietita offers to help her find work.

One day when Joaquin is visiting Prietita, a neighbor calls out that the Border Patrol is in the area. They run to his shack, alert his mother, then the three of them go to the curandera for help. Joaquin and his mother then hide until the border patrol leave. The curandera invites Prietita to gather herbs from her garden and offers to teach her how to prepare them to heal Joaquín's sores. She also invites Prietita to become her apprentice.

== Reception ==
Rose Trevino of the School Library Journal says: "...this is an important book for libraries in border states as it touches on timely and sensitive issues." Kirkus Reviews calls it "An authentic portrayal; an excellent basis for discussion of an important issue."

== Author ==
As a young Chicana growing up in South Texas, Anzaldúa suffered discrimination because her family was poor and Mexican. Living near the Rio Grande, Anzaldúa saw many women and children who had crossed the border to search for work and these experiences influenced the writing of "Friends from the Other Side" and inspired her to tell of life in the borderlands. "She imprinted her heroine, Prietita, as a 'bridge'- a way of transforming the world. For Anzaldúa, writing books for children was an important step of activism because children would effect necessary cultural and social transformations."

Anzaldúa is well known for her semi-autobiographical book Borderlands/La Frontera: The New Mestiza in which she describes the effects of the border on every aspect of mestizo life: social, emotional, psychological, etc. In Friends from the Other Side/ Amigos del Otro Lado, she attempts to make her experience and knowledge in Chicano theory accessible to children.

Anzaldúa later moved to Santa Cruz, California where she worked as a professor at University of California, Santa Cruz. She was a scholar of Chicano cultural theory, feminist theory, and queer theory. She died on May 15, 2004, due to complications with diabetes.

== Illustrator ==
Consuelo Méndez Castillo is an artist from Caracas, Venezuela who spent a large part of her early life in South Texas and later moved to San Francisco to study art. She was one of the original three women in the Bay Area muralist team, Mujeres Muralistas who painted several murals that depicted aspects of Latino life, injustices, and social issues and was part of the artistic movement Mission muralismo. Castillo is a widely exhibited artist in Latin America and has illustrated several children's books including Friends from the Other Side/ Amigos del Otro Lado and Atariba and Niguayona: A Story from the Taino People of Puerto Rico (Tales of the Americas). She returned to South Texas to do research for the illustrations of this book.

== See also ==
- Latino children's literature
