= People Should Not Die in June in South Texas =

1984 short story by Gloria E. Anzaldúa

"People Should Not Die in June in South Texas" is a short story by Chicana writer Gloria E. Anzaldúa, published in 1984.

== Contents and analysis ==
The story is a fictionalized account of Gloria E. Anzaldúa's father dying while she was a child, though Anzaldúa said it was "straight autobiography" and "as close to the truth as I get". The narrator is a young girl named Prieta (though her precise age is never stated), and Anzaldúa writes the story in a close, personal fashion. Though the story is bilingual—written in both English and Spanish—the narrative is increasingly written in English as the story progresses; literary critic Mary Loving Blanchard writes that Anzaldúa's choice depicts Prieta "leaving behind [...] the language of her parents and moving toward individuation via adoption of another tongue".

It is part of her collection of Prieta stories, most of which have not been published.
