= Spiritual activism =

Means for Social Transformation

Spiritual activism is a practice that brings together the otherworldly and inward-focused work of spirituality and the outwardly-focused work of activism (which focuses on the conditions of the material or physical world). Spiritual activism asserts that these two practices are inseparable and calls for a recognition that the binaries of inward/outward, spiritual/material, and personal/political all form part of a larger interconnected whole between and among all living things. In an essay on queer Chicana feminist and theorist Gloria E. Anzaldúa's reflections on spiritual activist practice, AnaLouise Keating states that "spiritual activism is spirituality for social change, spirituality that posits a relational worldview and uses this holistic worldview to transform one's self and one's worlds."

Spiritual activism is most often described as being separate from organized religion or dogma, but rather as activism that is generally egalitarian, particularly in service for people who are oppressed or marginalized, as well as for the Earth and all living things. Numerous women of color scholars, especially Black womanists and Chicana feminists, have developed and written about spiritual activism in their work as a way of creating positive social change. The Jewish rabbi Avraham Weiss describes spiritual activism in similar terms, as a fundamental teaching from Torah, and the Christian scholar Robert McAfee Brown says it's necessary to "overcome the great fallacy" to bring about real change.

In an article on yoga practice and spiritual activism, Womanist scholar Jillian Carter Ford states that "spiritual notions of oneness, such as the oneness of mind/body and the oneness of all people, sets in motion a spiritual activism wherein spirituality is engaged to create social and ecological uplift." For beginners, this often means unlearning or deconstructing "a host of harmful messages we have been socialized to believe." Ecowomanist Layli Maparyan describes spiritual activism as "putting spirituality to work for positive social and ecological change."

The concept emerged in late 20th and early 21st century scholarship in the fields of womanism and Chicana feminism, to describe the spiritual practice of creating a more socially just world through developing the capacities of the internal spiritual self in order to create social change that ends oppression and is generally egalitarian (separate from organized religion or any form of dogma).

The writers and scholars describing it have noted how spiritual activism is generally dismissed in academia and the Western world because spirituality cannot be controlled or measured within the confines of rational thought, along with the assumption that it is otherwise primitive, backward, based on superstition or delusion.

== Practice ==
According to those who engage in the work of spiritual activism, the practice involves developing one's internal capacities in order to create and inspire change in the material world or society at large. Thus, inherent to the work of spiritual activism is an awareness of a power beyond the material to address a dissatisfaction in the status quo.

Chicana feminist Gloria E. Anzaldúa explains the call to spiritual activism as originating out of a love for all things and a desire to create harmony and balance in the world:

With awe and wonder you look around, recognizing the preciousness of earth, the sanctity of every human being on the planet, the ultimate unity and interdependence of all beings–somos todos un país. Love swells in your chest and shoots out of your heart chakra, linking you to everyone/everything... You share a category of identity wider than any social position or racial label. This conocimiento motivates you to work actively to see that no harm comes to people, animals, ocean–to take up spiritual activism and healing.

Chicana feminist Ana Castillo states in her book Massacre of the Dreamers: Essays on Xicanisma that one's spirituality must be focused on serving the needs of one's own survival and the survival of one's community in a world where "sanity remains defined simply by the ability to cope with insane conditions." For Castillo, Chicana/os and other colonized people must seek to understand oneself, integrate their own fragmentation, and embrace ancestral or Indigenous knowledge to create conditions of social justice for their communities, humanity, and the universe. Castillo writes:

All too often, we see success in direct correlation with financial gain and assimilation into mainstream culture. Xicanistas grapple with our need to thoroughly understand who we are–gifted human beings–and to believe in our talents, our worthiness and beauty, while having to survive within the constructs of a world antithetical to our intuition and knowledge regarding life's meaning. Our vision must encompass sufficient confidence that the dominant society will eventually give credence to our ways, if the planet and its inhabitants are to thrive.

Similarly, Roberto Vargas and Samuel C. Martinez write that spiritual activism should be paired with cultural and political activism in order to create positive social change within oppressed communities. Velcrow Ripper states that "spiritual activism is not about religion, it is not about any form of dogma, it is activism that comes from the heart, not just the head, activism that is compassionate, positive, kind, fierce, and transformative." This is particularly important to understand, considering that, historically, the practice of spiritual activism has led to religious fundamentalism if strictly developed under a specific religious tradition. Confirming these concepts in his broad examination of historical and current activist movements, Alastair McIntosh writes:

Activists can so easily fall into the trap of … ignoring inconvenient truths… Because truth is so vital to spirituality, the activist motivated from this depth never as a final, dogmatic solution. A spiritual activist is one who puts truth before all else, hence the title of Gandhi’s autobiography: Experiments with Truth.

In her examination of the lives and work of people she considers as having "real success," Alaskan therapist Wanda Krause states that such people:

consciously choose actions according to notions of principles ... They move beyond the material to embrace a higher intelligence – and experience real success.

Some of those I have studied do not feel that they are spiritual at all. Some activists do not wish to be elevated to any notion of greatness as they assure me they have their share of past mistakes. Not everyone who I refer to as a spiritual activist affirms a religious belief.

…The truly successful align their goals with conscious duty and purpose. … spiritual activists reflect something beyond rational opportunist thinking – a guidance, higher knowing, strong inner calling and principled action.

Alastair McIntosh goes on to say

Spiritual activism works mainly at the pre-political level. It digs the pilot channels into which subsequent political processes can flow. [Spirituality is] central to activism because it is, first of all, a way of knowing. That leads on to a way of doing, and from thee, to a way of being in what becomes a positive feedback loop…. They all reinforce one another.

And, stressing the importance of a spiritual basis for any effective activism, he states:

Spirituality values wholes as sacred. Sacredness is not a capitulation to superstition. Sacred is the appropriate adjective for whole things that cannot be taken apart and put back together again, and therefore cannot be valued in material terms (quoting Hafiz’ tale of robbers of a large diamond): healthy forests, snow leopards, clean rivers, starry nights, daughters and brothers and lovers and friends. If nothing is sacred, nothing is safe from the mechanizers of life and calculators of profit; and until we find ways to resacralize our world appropriately, there can be no end to the carnage.

== Dismissal ==
=== In academia ===
Spirituality is widely dismissed in the Western world and within Western institutions as a result of what is known as the Cartesian split: the doctrine introduced by René Descartes in the 1600s to ensure that scientists could practice without fear of oppression by the Roman church. Through the European Enlightenment and legacy of colonialism that followed, the division between the linear, rational methods of science and the intuitive, relational practices of religion and spirituality was imposed on Indigenous peoples as well, discounting the practices and ways of knowing that had developed independently of European science. As a result, the work of numerous scholars, most of whom are women of color and Chicana feminists, have been discounted. For example, many scholars in academia tend to ignore Gloria Anzaldúa's discussion of spirituality, even while recognizing her contributions to feminist theory and borderlands theory. Supporters of spiritual activism argue that, by ignoring this element of Anzaldúa's work, these academics are missing the practice that actually developed Anzaldúa's important theoretical contributions.

AnaLouise Keating states that this is because academics are trained "to rely almost exclusively on rational thought, anti-spiritual forms of logical reasoning, and empirical demonstrations." M. Jacqui Alexander states that "there is a tacit understanding that no self-respecting postmodernist would want to align herself (at least in public) with a category such as the spiritual, which appears [to them] so fixed, so unchanging, so redolent of tradition."

=== In Western society ===
While the Cartesian split between spirituality and science affects all seekers of knowledge, Laura E. Pérez argues that the general dismissal of spirituality (especially outside of organized religion) is a legacy of colonialism that has situated women of color and spirituality as "the inferior opposites to the rational, Christian, Western European, and male" and that this dismissal is rooted in the West's need to affirm itself as superior, civilized, and more advanced. Pérez notes that spirituality is generally dismissed in the West as:

superstition, folk belief, or New Age delusion, when not relegated to the socially controlled spaces of the orientalist study of 'primitive animism' or of 'respectable' religion within dominant culture. Even in invoking the spiritual as a field articulated through cultural differences, and in so doing attempting to displace dominant Christian notions of the spiritual while addressing the fear of politically regressive essentialisms, to speak about the s/Spirit and the spiritual in U.S. culture is risky business that raises anxieties of different sorts.

Irene Lara notes that women of color and "all 'others' who have been similarly other-ized and fragmented" are at the center of spiritual activist work and must fight against being dismissed and silenced in the Western world. As Lara states, "though we aim to transform our selves and our worlds, the reality is that we are part of a society still largely organized around racist and sexist binary ways of knowing." Ana Castillo states:

Who in this world of the glorification of material wealth, whiteness, and phallic worship would consider us [marginalized women] holders of knowledge that could transform this world into a place where the quality of life for all living things on this planet is the utmost priority, where we are all engaged in a life process that is meaningful from birth to death, where we accept death as organic to life, where death does not come to us in the form of one more violent and unjust act committed against our right to live?
