= Nepantla =

Concept in Chicano and Latino culture

Nepantla is a concept used in Chicano and Latino anthropology, social commentary, criticism, literature and art. It represents a concept of "in-between-ness." Nepantla is a Nahuatl word which means "in the middle of it" or "middle." It may refer specifically to the space between two figurative or literal bodies of water. In contemporary usage, Nepantla often refers to being between two cultures, particularly one's original culture and the dominant one. It usually refers to a position of perspective, power, or potential, but it is sometimes used to designate a state of pain or loss.

== History ==
Nepantla was a term that was first used by Nahuas in Central Mexico, especially the Triple Alliance of Anahuac or "Aztec Empire". Book 6 of the Florentine Codex preserves the knowledge of the ilamatlācah "wise old women":

Tlachichiquilco in tihuih in tinemih tlālticpac: nipa centlami, nipa centlami. In tlā nipa xiyāuh in tlā noceh nipa xiyāuh ōmpa tonhuetziz: zan tlanepantlah in huīlōhua in nemōhua.
We travel along a mountain ridge while we live on earth, an abyss yawning on either side. If you stray too far one way or the other, you will fall away. Only by keeping to the middle way does one walk on and live."

Nahuas further refined the term in Mexico during the 16th century. During this time, they were being colonized by the Spaniards and the concept of being "in between" was useful to describe how the experience felt. Some attribute the concept directly to the colonized Aztecs, and others have attributed anthropologist Miguel León-Portilla (1926–2019) as first describing the concept. Leon-Portilla further describes how indigenous people who the Spanish conquered created their own "in between" culture. They would leave behind aspects of their culture that they could not synthesize into the new culture.

== Uses ==
=== Political ===
Nepantla can be described as a "liminal" space, where multiple forms of reality are viewed at the same time. This concept can be useful when addressing multicultural groups of people, where finding consensus can be difficult. Allowing individuals to examine concepts that seem to compete and understanding both is also a process of using nepantla.

Nepantla can also describe individuals or groups who are today in conflict with a larger, perhaps more globally reaching culture or ideology. Nepantla has also been identified as a tool for political change. Individuals who live within two different "worlds" or "cultures" can act as a "fulcrum" to engage in political change.

=== Academic ===
Nevada State University has a four-year nepantla program created to empower first-generation college students through mentorship, access to resources, community building and professional success through self discovery.

Dominican University commissions a Nepantla Undergraduate Research Journal. This journal seeks to promote the artistic expressions of faith, culture, and justice of undergraduate students. "The nepantla identity of our students also informs the ways in which they theologize; this journal will explore the many ways students engage with the divine through art and social justice".

=== Written ===
Gloria E. Anzaldúa writes about Nepantla in the context of the writing process. In her book Borderlands/La Frontera, she says, “it is one of the stages of writing, the stage where you have all these ideas, all these images, sentences and paragraphs, and where you are trying to make them into one piece, a story, plot or whatever—it is all very chaotic.” Nepantla in the general definition is a space, and in this context, it is the space of construction in the writing process.

Author Victor Piñeiro speaks on his experience with Nepantla in his own life and how he portrays the concept while writing coming-of-age books including Latinx characters. While speaking about his book Time Villains, Piñeiro notes "readers who have had what Anzaldúa has described as ‘seeing’ double, first from the perspective of one culture, then from the perspective of another, will notice the small moments of Nepantla throughout the book. It's an experience I'm exploring in more depth in future books because it's so emblematic of the Latinx experience. And it's one that I'm paying more attention as I read Latinx fiction, as it's everywhere."

In 2013, Christopher Soto founded Nepantla as an online journal with Lambda Literary. The mission of the journal was to nurture, celebrate, and preserve diversity within the queer poetry community. The journal existed online for three years and in that time frame it gained the attention of thousands of readers internationally. With the guidance and support of William Johnson at Lambda Literary, Soto helped Nepantla quickly become a refuge for some of the most prominent queer of color poets in the United States. In 2018, Nepantla: Queer Poets of Color was released. The title of this book uses nepantla to imply a transient feeling, the feeling of shifting between various communities and identities.

=== Artistic ===
In the arts, nepantla is a creator's imaginary world that encompasses historical, emotional and spiritual aspects of life. Nepantla as a term might also refer to living in the borderlands or being at literal or metaphorical crossroads.

=== Emotional ===
Nepantla as a concept has also been identified as a painful experience, where a person's sense of self has been "shattered." It can also signify a personal state of "invisibility and transition." Anzaldúa described nepantla as time where individuals experience a loss of control and suffer anxiety and confusion as a result. Nepantleras are people who help people with transitions and identity issues, they use healing practices, writings, art, and more. Nepantleras can be associated with curanderas.

== Quotes ==
"The world is in a constant state of Nepantla."—Maria E. Fránquiz

“Now I call [the concept of borders and borderlands] Nepantla, which is a Nahuatl word for the space between two bodies of water, the space between two worlds. It is a limited space, a space where you are not this or that but where you are changing” - Gloria E. Anzaldúa

"I use the word nepantla to theorize liminality and to talk about those who facilitate passages between worlds, whom I’ve named nepantleras." -Gloria E. Anzaldúa

"Living between cultures results in 'seeing' double, first from the perspective of one culture, then from the perspective of another. Seeing from two or more perspectives simultaneously renders those cultures transparent. Removed from that culture's center you glimpse the sea in which you've been immersed but to which you were oblivious, no longer seeing the world the way you were enculturated to see it."—Gloria E. Anzaldúa

"You're experiencing nepantla. We feel that in South Texas. We have these two cultures coalescing, and this third one emerges. We eat hot dogs and tacos. We drink hot chocolate and Lone Star Beer." -- Santa Barraza
