= La Prieta =

1981 essay by Gloria E. Anzaldúa

- Author: Gloria E. Anzaldúa
- Media type: Essay
- Subject: Colorism, racism, Tejana identity

La Prieta is a 1981 essay by the Tejana feminist scholar Gloria E. Anzaldúa, originally published in the anthology This Bridge Called My Back.

== About ==
The essay explores Anzaldúa's identity as a white/mestiza Tejana from a formerly affluent, sixth-generation Texan family. She explores the racism, colorism, sexism, heteronormativity, and classism of her parents and grandparents, who scorned her for being too dark-skinned and who identified with whiteness and Americanness rather than with Mexican, Indigenous, and Black people. La prieta is a Spanish-language term referring to a dark-skinned woman or girl.

The essay belongs to the Nettie Lee Benson Latin American Collection at The University of Texas at Austin, having acquired Anzaldúa's works in 2005.

== See also ==
- Discrimination based on skin tone
