= AnaLouise Keating =

American academic (born 1961)

AnaLouise Keating (born June 24, 1961) is an American academic who is professor of Multicultural Women's and Gender Studies at Texas Woman's University in Denton, Texas. She is also the director of the department's PhD program. Keating's multiple books, essays, and edited collections primarily focus on transformation studies, U.S. women-of-color theories, Gloria Anzaldúa and pedagogy.

Keating earned a Doctorate of Philosophy in English in 1990 from University of Illinois at Urbana–Champaign. She has held appointments at Eastern New Mexico University (1990–1999) and Aquinas College (1999–2001).

Keating is currently working on two projects including a book on Gloria Anzaldúa's theories, which is under contract with Duke University Press, and a book on womanist spiritual activism, which is under contract with the University of Illinois Press. Her book on womanist spiritual activism will be a part of her book series, Transformations: Womanist, Feminist, & Indigenous Studies.

Keating is a trustee of the Gloria E. Anzaldúa Literary Trust.

== Selected publications ==
- Keating, AnaLouise. Women Reading Women Writing, Temple University Press, 1996. ISBN 978-1566394208.
- Anzaldúa, Gloria E. Interviews/Entrevistas, edited by AnaLouise Keating, Routledge, 2000. ISBN 978-0415925044.
- Anzaldúa, Gloria E. The Gloria Anzaldúa Reader, edited by AnaLouise Keating, Duke University Press, 2009. ISBN 978-0822345640.
- Anzaldúa, Gloria E., and AnaLouise Keating, editors. this bridge we call home: radical visions for transformation. Routledge, 2002. ISBN 978-0415936828.
- Keating, AnaLouise. Teaching Transformation: Transcultural Classroom Dialogues, Palgrave Macmillan, 2010. ISBN: 978-0230104907.
- Keating, AnaLouise. Transformation Now! Toward a Post-Oppositional Politics of Change. University of Illinois Press, 2012. ISBN: 978-0252079399.
- Keating, AnaLouise. "Speculative Realism, Visionary Pragmatism, and Poet-Shamanic Aesthetics in Gloria Anzaldúa—and Beyond." WSQ: Women's Studies Quarterly, vol. 40, no. 3, 2013, pp. 51–69.
- Keating, AnaLouise. "Spiritual Activism, Visionary Pragmatism, and Threshold Theorizing." Departures in Critical Qualitative Research, vol. 5, no. 3, 2016, pp.: 101–107.
- Anzaldúa, Gloria E. Light in the Dark/Luz en lo Oscuro: Rewriting Identity, Spirituality, Reality, edited by AnaLouise Keating, Duke University Press, 2015. ISBN 978-0822360094.
