= New tribalism =

Sociological theory

New tribalism is a theory by queer Chicana feminist Gloria E. Anzaldúa to disrupt the matrix of imposed identity categories that the hegemonic culture imposes on people in order to maintain its power and authority. Anzaldúa states that she "appropriated" and reused the term from David Rieff, who had "used it to criticize [her] for being 'a professional Aztec' and for what he saw as [her] naive and nostalgic return to Indigenous roots." Rieff stated that Anzaldúa should "think a little less about race and a little more about class." In response, Anzaldúa developed the concept in order to form an inclusive social identity that "motivates subordinated communities to work together in coalition."

New tribalism has been referred to as "a provocative alternative to both assimilation and separatism" by building identity on affinity-based terms which keeps the formation of alliances against oppression in mind. Anzaldúa also developed the theory in response to critics who referred to her imagining of mestizaje "as narrow nationalism or essentialism," and instead urges readers to think about existing categories differently so that new language may be repeatedly formed and reformed. Scholars acknowledge that this work may be uncomfortable, confusing, and chaotic, but argue that this cannot be a reason to abandon the path forward. Although developed from her own perspective, the theory was not created to only contextualize the Chicana or Latina experience.

== Application ==
Anzaldúa states that new tribalism is a way to think forward, that is to acknowledge:

[that] existing language is based on the old concepts; we need a new language to speak about new situations, the new realities. There's no such thing as pure categories anymore... categories contain, imprison, limit, and keep us from growing. We have to disrupt those categories and invent new ones. The new ones will only be good for a few years and then somebody will come along and say, 'These categories don't work, you didn't take into account this other part of reality.' Someone will come up with their own concepts. To me these categories are very much in transition. They're impermanent, fluid, not fixed. That's how I look at identity and race and gender and sexual orientation. It's not something that's forever and ever true.

While the theory may be read as a critique of identity politics, Anzaldúa recognized the importance of naming specific axes of oppression. Scholar Meredith Miller describes new tribalism as a theory which "would allow people to name their oppression in groups without seeing those categories as exhaustive or limiting and without playing into the hands of capitalist nation-building enterprises." What concerned Anzaldúa was the prevalence of "dualistic thinking in the individual and collective consciousness," which she understood as the root of violence against women, humans, and the Earth.

For Anzaldúa, new tribalism challenged this binary-focused thinking of us/them. As summarized by Cinthya M. Saavedra and Ellen D. Nymark, new tribalism "is about how we/you/they can witness how we are in all each other," in which we are all dependent on one another for the prosperity of the larger unit. They describe the theory as avoiding "essentialist notions of who we/they/us are and constantly challenges who we are, critiquing others as a way to reevaluate ourselves."

== Bridging ==
New tribalism has been compared to the idea of building bridges between people "who are feeling and living the historical and contemporary effects of Western hegemonic politics, juridical discourses, and economic disenfranchisement." The concept has been compared with Chela Sandoval's discussion on bridging:

The bridge means loosening our borders, not closing off borders, not closing off to others. Bridging is the work of opening the gate to the stranger, within and without. To step across the threshold is to be stripped of the illusion of safety because it moves us into unfamiliar territory and does not grant safe passage. To bridge is to attempt community, and for that we must risk being open to personal, political, and spiritual intimacy, to risk being wounded. Effective bridging comes from knowing when to close ranks to those outside our home, group, community, nation—and when to keep the gates open.

== See also ==
- Iyaric – Dialect of English used by Rastafarians
