= Mission muralismo =

Mission Muralismo was an artistic movement that brought awareness of issues as well as depicted everyday life as lived by the people in the San Francisco Mission District and other barrios around the world. The Mission was an artistic playground for muralists to speak out about injustices and social issues around their city, the country and the world. Latin American muralists voiced their cries for international attention and aimed to create awareness for the social and political problems of Latin America through the murals they painted. The Nicaraguan community especially contributed to artistic projects to shed light on the Nicaraguan Revolution and their struggles from 1979 to the 1990s.

== Origins and influences ==
Murialismo can credit its origins to agencies like the Works Progress Administration (WPA), a New Deal federal program established during the Great Depression to employ millions of struggling Americans to carry out public works projects along with supporting large arts, drama, media, and literacy projects. The WPA helped fund artists like Diego Rivera in the 1930s, who helped bring an international muralist perspective to the Mission District. Other muralists like David Alfaro Siquieros and José Clemente Orozco who, with Rivera, made up the group Los Tres Grandes, also continued to innovate and bring “stylistic orthodoxy” to make “ideological and religious tableaux”.

This foundation and influence was at the core of Mission Muralismo as values like being “outscale” and “outspoken” became standard in the murals and projects painted throughout the decades. The nature of being outspoken is what helped contribute to the precedent that murals in the Mission District aimed to present.

== Solidarity with Latin American Movements ==
Beyond Mexican muralists in the 1930s to the 1960s, there was a growing Central American refugees escaping political turbulence and civil war in the 1970s, some of whom found refuge in the Mission District. Nicaraguan artists and poets in particular found a home in San Francisco to build a solidarity movement with the Nicaraguan struggle. Roberto Vargas, a famed literary figure in the Nicaraguan community, critically stated, “we came in the human wave fleeing the brutality of the Somoza regime”—the human wave being the vast migration of Nicaraguan refugees. With poets and artists like Vargas, along with the aftermath of the political atmosphere of the late 1960s in the Bay Area, the struggle to liberate Nicaragua from Somoza’s regime continued in the Mission District. The Nicaraguans who came from that human wave banded together and created a movement from the barrio, showing a strong sense of solidarity for the Sandinista struggle in Nicaragua by setting up offices for the Sandinista Front and spreading the word on the uprising through La Prensa, a newspaper from Managua, Nicaragua.

== The Murals ==
The Sandinista victory brought forth a great sense of pride from the Nicaraguan community as well as building bridges with other Latin American communities. The exterior of Casa Nicaragua in the Mission District boasts a mural featuring “Chilean and Nicaraguan symbols beneath a handshake of support between the two countries,” reflecting the respect the Nicaraguan community has for the Chilean government under the fallen President Salvador Allende and celebrating the Sandinista victory. In the decade that the Sandinistas controlled Nicaragua, “close to three hundred murals were created” by muralists who traveled to Nicaragua from the Bay Area to bring the solidarity movement back to the homeland, showing an American support from the barrio of the Mission District to the barrios in Nicaragua.

== Recognition ==
Although the murals exist in the Mission District and in Nicaragua, more notable movements like the United States’ government support for the Contra War, the effort to establish a counter military movement to combat and overthrow the Sandinista government, suppress the artistic movement. Mission Muralismo and its influence on the Nicaraguan solidarity struggle is imperative to understand how the politics and atmosphere of political turbulence affected the barrios in Nicaragua and the barrios created in the United States as a result of the conflict. The murals serve as a voice for the barrio, one of the many tools used to make concerns vocal and visible to their communities in Nicaragua and in their new American home.

== See also ==
- Clarion Alley Mural Project / Clarion Alley
- Balmy Alley
- Precita Eyes
- The Women's Building
- Mujeres Muralistas
