= Borderlands/La Frontera: The New Mestiza =

1987 book by Gloria Anzaldúa

- Author: Gloria Anzaldúa
- Cover artist: Pamela Wilson
- Language: English & Spanish
- Genre: Essay
- Publisher: Aunt Lute Books
- Publication date: 1987
- Publication place: United States
- Media type: Print (paperback)
- Pages: 260 pp.
- ISBN: 978-1-879960-12-1

Borderlands/La Frontera: The New Mestiza is a 1987 semi-autobiographical work by Gloria E. Anzaldúa that examines the Chicano and Latino experience through the lens of issues such as gender, identity, race, and colonialism. Borderlands is considered to be Anzaldúa’s most well-known work and a pioneering piece of Chicana literature.

In an interview, Anzaldúa claims to have drawn inspiration from the ethnic and social communities of her youth as well as from her experiences as a woman of color in academia. Scholars also argue that Anzaldúa re-conceptualized the theory of the "mestiza" from the Chicano Movement.

The term Borderlands, according to Anzaldúa, refers to the geographical area that is most susceptible to la mezcla [hybridity], neither fully of Mexico nor fully of the United States. She also used this term to identify a growing population that cannot distinguish these invisible "borders," who instead have learned to become a part of both worlds, worlds whose cultural expectations they are still expected to abide by. Borderlands details the invisible "borders" that exist between Latinas/os and non-Latinas/os, men and women, heterosexuals and homosexuals, and other groups. Each of the essays and poems draws on the author’s life experiences as a Chicana and a lesbian. In both prose and poetry sections, Anzaldúa challenges the conception of a border as a divide and calls for the majority, especially those from the Western culture, to nurture active interest in the oppressed, and change their attitudes that foster the growth of borders.

Borderlands is a semi-autobiographical account that contains a mixture of prose and poetry. Anzaldúa alternates between Spanish and English using a technique such as “code-switching.” Additionally, Anzaldúa’s frequent usage of metaphors and imagery has been described by scholars as “poet-shaman aesthetics.”

Borderlands has been a subject of controversy; it has been promoted in educational spaces for its role in affirming student identity, but also targeted by Arizona House Bill 2281, which banned the teaching of ethnic studies courses and literature that were thought to “promote resentment towards a race or class of people”.

== Background ==
Born in the Rio Grande Valley of South Texas on September 26, 1942, Gloria Anzaldúa grew up on a ranch where her parents worked as farmers. In an interview with Professor of Literature Ann E. Reuman, Anzaldúa expresses that her ethnic background and childhood experiences in a southern Texas farming culture both heavily influenced her work in Borderlands.

In 1969, Anzaldúa received her bachelor's degree in English from the University of Texas- Pan American. From there, she went onto a master's program at the University of Texas-Austin and graduated with her master's in English and Education in 1972. On May 15, 2004, Gloria Anzaldúa died of diabetes complications.

As the publication of Borderlands followed the Chicano Movement, Professor of Sociology María L. Amado argues that Anzaldúa drew influence for her concept of the “new mestiza” from that of “la Raza mestiza,” a theory of collective identity predicated on notions of racial purity created by philosopher José Vasconcelos, later adopted by Chicanos.

Scholar Melissa Castillo-Garsow also lends much of Anzaldúa’s influence to her experiences as a woman of color in academia. Rather than having Borderlands maintain adherence to academic norms, Castillo-Garsow argues that Anzaldúa’s work challenges traditional paradigms through her theorization of the “mestiza consciousness” and the intermingling of her own Chicano Spanish with standard academic English, drawing from her background as a Chicana woman.

== Summary ==
=== Chapter 1: The Homeland, Aztlán / El Otro México ===
El otro Mexico que aca hemos construido, el espacio es lo que ha sido territorio nacional. Este el esfuerzo de todos nuestros hermanos y latinoamericanos que han sabido progressar.

The other Mexico that we have constructed, the space is what has become national territory. This is the work of all our brothers and Latin Americans who have known how to progress.

In this first chapter, Anzaldúa argues that land is not the property of European descendants but rather is of Indigenous ancestry, "humankind in the U.S. – the Chicanos' ancient Indian ancestors – was found in Texas and has been dated to 3500 B.C." Further, Anzaldúa describes the removal of Mexican and Indigenous populations from their land during the Mexican-American War. She refers to this as “the fiction of White Superiority,” in which the “Anglos” claimed both the territory of and power over its previous Mexican and Indian inhabitants. Anzaldúa contends this displacement of Mexican and Indigenous communities extended beyond the border, as corporations and landowners from the U.S. began to decrease Mexico’s monetary sovereignty.

=== Chapter 2: Movimientos de Rebeldía y las Culturas que Traicionan ===
Esos movimientos de rebeldía que tenemos en la sangre nosotros los mexicanos surgen como ríos desbocanados en mis venas. Those rebellious movements we Mexicans have in our blood surge like overflowing rivers in my veins.

She recognizes that she challenges social norms and her culture in various ways. She wants to be happy with the way she is, but it causes discomfort within society and her family. By being lesbian, she challenges the norms imposed by the Catholic Church. As a little girl, she was raised to keep her mouth shut, respect men, slave for men, marry a man, and not ask questions. Gloria was not allowed to be "selfish" and if she was not doing something for a man, then it was considered laziness. "Every bit of self-faith I'd painstakingly gathered took a beating daily". She felt her culture taught that it was wrong for her to improve herself but despite the setbacks, she continued on her journey.

Anzaldúa challenged all norms in her life; she questioned aspects such as religion, culture, homosexuality, and femininity. All presented barriers that forced her to be someone she was not comfortable being. She did not meet these demands because her identity is grounded in Indian women's history of resistance. Instead of moving forward, she feels as if the ideas presented in those circles are regressive and hinder people's growth and happiness. Rebellious actions are a means to disband certain ideologies and show people that some cultural traditions betray their people.

=== Chapter 3: Entering Into The Serpent ===
Sueño con serpientes, con serpientes del mar; con cierto mar, ay de serpientes sueño yo. Largas, transparentes, en sus barrigas llevan lo que puedan arebatarle [sic] al amor. Oh, oh, oh, la mató [sic] y aparece una mayor. Oh, con much más infierno en digestión.

I dream of serpents, serpents of the sea, oh, of serpents I dream. Long, transparent, in their bellies they carry all that they can snatch away from love. Oh, oh, oh, I kill one and a larger one appears. Oh, with more hellfire burning inside!

One of the main symbols of Mexican religious and mythological culture is that of the snake, la víbora. Anzaldúa, in this chapter, thoroughly outlines the different aspects [both negative and positive] of la víbora and how these different characteristics have affected her life as a Chicana. She continues the chapter by identifying the Virgen de Guadalupe, one of Catholicism’s famous pagan entities, through her Indian names Coatlalopeuh and Coatlicue, which translate into “serpent” and “she who wears a serpent skirt,” respectively. In the Aztec-Mexica society, after the trek from Aztlán, women were able to possess property, were gwalees and priestesses, and royal blood ran through the female line. By taking away her Coatlalopeuh, Guadalupe was deleted and no longer had the serpent/sexuality aspect in her personality. Her story was remade by a male-dominated Aztec-Mexican culture that drove female entities underground by placing male entities in their place.

Regardless of the stance she remained after her desexing and the masculinization of religion, she became the largest symbol in Mexican religion, politics, and culture today, surpassing the importance of Jesus and God the Father in the lives of the Mexican population, both in Mexico and in the United States. Chicana culture, according to Anzaldúa, no longer identifies with the Spanish father but with the Indian mother. Continuing with the symbol of the serpent, Anzaldúa claims that the Serpent’s mouth is associated with womanhood, which was guarded by rows of dangerous teeth. She also states that it is a symbol of the dark, sexual drive, the chthonic, the feminine, the serpentine movement of sexuality, of creativity, and the basis of all energy and life. She ends the chapter by identifying and thoroughly describing la facultad or the capacity to see in surface phenomena the meaning of deeper realities.

=== Chapter 4: La Herencia de Coatlicue/ the Coatlicue State ===
"The act of being seen, held immobilized by a glance, and 'seeing through' an experience are symbolized by the underground aspects of Coatlicue, Cihuacoatl, and Tlazolteotl which cluster in what I call the Coatlicue state."

In this chapter, Anzaldúa begins by describing the importance of the mirror and what it can symbolize in different cultures. To her, the mirror is a "door through which the soul may ‘pass’ to the other side and [her mother] didn’t want [her children] to accidentally follow [their] father to the place where the souls of the dead live." Through this personal anecdote, which becomes relevant to the rest of her chapter, she then transitions into the idea of the Coatlicue state and what being a part of that state entails. She describes the Coatlicue state as having duality in life, a synthesis of duality, and a third perspective, something more than mere duality or a synthesis of duality. She concludes this short chapter by describing the moment in which she allowed the Coatlicue state to take control after years of attempting to rule herself. She states that she is never alone and that she is no longer afraid after this moment, when she finally feels complete.

=== Chapter 5: How to Tame a Wild Tongue ===
"And I think, how do you tame a wild tongue, train it to be quiet, how do you bridle and saddle it? How do you make it lie down?"

This chapter focuses on language, primarily the different aspects of Spanish and English as people of Mexican descent in the United States speak each. She brings up the struggle of learning a second language as a young girl in school when the educators are attempting to suppress a large part of her culture. She goes as far as saying that the “attack on one’s form of expression with the intent to censor [is] a violation of the First Amendment” and that “wild tongues can’t be tamed, they can only be cut out.”

Anzaldúa also lists eight different varieties of languages spoken by Chicanas/os including:

1. Standard English
2. Working class and slang English
3. Standard Spanish
4. Standard Mexican Spanish
5. North Mexican Spanish dialect
6. Chicano Spanish (Texas, New Mexico, Arizona and California have regional variations)
7. Tex-Mex
8. Pachuco (called caló)

She reserves a section to talk about Pocho’s, or Anglicized Mexican or Americans of Mexican origin who speak Spanish with an accent characteristic of North Americans and who distort and reconstruct the language according to the influence of English. This person is someone who has betrayed their culture by not properly speaking the language of their homeland. However, Anzaldúa argues that being Mexican is a state of soul, not one of mind, nor one of citizenship. Neither eagle nor serpent, but both.

She ends the chapter with a discourse about Chicano Spanish and its influence on the lives of Chicanas, like Anzaldúa, who grew up believing that they spoke a broken dialect of Spanish. There is an internalization of identification through childhood experiences with culture [language, food, music, film, etc.], which, according to Anzaldúa, means the different experiences the Chicanas/os have growing up influence the manner in which they see the world.

=== Chapter 6: Tlilli, Tlapalli/ The Path of Red and Black Ink ===
“My 'stories' are acts encapsulated in time, 'enacted' every time they are spoken aloud or read silently I like to think of them as performers and not as inert and 'dead' objects. Instead, the work has an identity; it is a 'who' or a “what' and contains the presences of persons, that is, incarnations of gods or ancestors or natural and cosmic powers. The work manifests the same needs as a person, it needs to be 'fed,' la tengo que bañar y vestir." (67)

This chapter covers an overall view on her writing. It tells how she used to tell stories to her sister under the covers at night. How she notices a Mosaic pattern (Aztec-like) emerging pattern (66). Starts talking about modern Western cultures and how they behave differently towards work of art from tribal cultures. She explains Ethnocentrism as the tyranny of Western aesthetics and talks about the conscious mind, how black and dark may be associated with death, evil and destruction, in the subconscious mind and in our dreams, white is associated with disease, death and hopelessness (69). She goes on to say about dreams how “awakened dreams” are about shifts. Through shifts, reality shifts, and gender shifts, a person metamorphoses it to another in a world where people fly through the air, heal from mortal wounds (70). She says how her writing produces anxiety and makes her look at herself and her experience at understanding her own conflicts, engendering anxiety within herself. That brings about the notion of shifts to borders.

=== Chapter 7: La Conciencia de la Mestiza / Towards a New Consciousness ===
“From this racial, ideological, cultural and biological crosspollenization, an “alien” consciousness is presently in the making – a new mestiza consciousness, una conciencia demujer. It is a consciousness of the Borderlands.” (77)

In this chapter, Anzaldúa speaks about the mestiza. La mestiza, is a product transfer of the cultural and spiritual values one group to another. She goes on to talk about la mestiza as perceiving a vision of reality in a culture that we all communicate. La mestiza gets multiple cultures including the Chicana culture. In the book it is stated that a Chicana culture is the white culture attacking common beliefs of the Mexican culture, and both attack commonly held beliefs of the indigenous culture. This chapter is deep on the thought of the mestiza who constantly has to shift to different problems who constantly include rather than exclude (78–79). Anzaldúa continues the chapter by writing about the work of the mestiza, whose main job is to break down the subject-object duality that keeps one prisoner. It is clear what Anzaldúa is trying to portray the pain of Indigenous people, the mestiza being a crossbreed, and how one is culture-less.

This chapter also speaks about the mestiza way and how we are people. She states that the dominant white culture is killing us slowly with their ignorance. This is the point in which Anzaldúa starts to speak about the Indigenous people. It ends with Gloria Anzaldúa writing about being back in her home, South Texas. How her valley struggles to survive, her father being dead by overwork from farm labor. This ending to her stories speaks towards the land and how it was once Chicano/a, Mexican, Hispanic, and Indigenous.

== Genre and style ==
Borderlands/La Frontera is a semi-autobiographical work of prose and poetry, approaching subjects such as race, gender, class, and identity.

Literary scholar Ana Louise Keating conceptualizes Anzaldúa’s writings in Borderlands as a form of “poet-shaman aesthetics,” which argues that Anzaldúa’s words are intended to have material implications. In particular, Keating draws from interviews in which Anzaldúa describes herself as a “shaman,” serving as an intermediary for individuals to connect them with their cultural background. Keating contends this role manifests in Anzaldúa’s poetry, with its frequent usages of metaphors and imagery as a means to articulate the experiences of oppressed populations and guide them toward emotional healing.

Another stylistic choice deployed by Anzaldúa in Borderlands is known as “code-switching,” that is, her interchanging usage of Chicano Spanish and English. According to scholar Melissa Castillo-Garsow, Anzaldúa utilizes this style to challenge conventional Western writings, while simultaneously maintaining Borderland’s academic legitimacy by limiting the usage of Spanish and Chicano vernacular in the book.

== Analysis ==
Anzaldúa’s Borderlands/La Frontera has been critically analyzed by several scholars through the lens of race, sexuality, indigeneity, and immigration.

Scholars have analyzed Borderlands/La Frontera from a variety of perspectives. Critical race scholar Miriam Jiménez Román criticizes Anzaldúa for organizing her work around eugenicist thinker José Vasconcelos' notion of mestizaje and contends that Anzaldúa’s emphasis on intermixing identities through the “mestiza consciousness” reifies current racial hierarchies and inequality. Meanwhile, Professor María L. Amado describes Anzaldúa’s Borderlands and her theory of “the new mestiza” as one of racial inclusivity that rearticulates and is distinct from Vasconcelos'. Scholar Ian Barnard argues that Anzaldúa universalizes the queer experience by incorporating various identity categories into her theory of the borderlands. Literary scholar Hsinya Huang argues that Borderlands forefronts the often excluded narratives of Indigenous people. Scholar AnaLouise Keating argues that Anzaldúa appropriates Indigeneity by referring to herself as a “shaman." Professor Amy Reed-Sandoval argues that Anzaldúa’s Borderlands contains early portrayals of “socially undocumented identity” by depicting the deportation of U.S. Citizens.

=== Race and sexuality ===
Using a critical race lens, Professor of Sociology María L. Amado argues that Anzaldúa subverts colonial paradigms and oppressive racial categories through her utilization of the term "new mestiza", which relies on the inclusion of racial minorities and queer people. Amado contrasts this to the concept of "old mestiza”, which relies on notions of racial purity and superiority as conceptualized by philosopher José Vasconcelos.

Race scholar Miriam Jiménez Román describes Anzaldúa’s "mestiza consciousness" as an extension of the multicultural project within the United States. Roman argues that due to Anzaldúa’s emphasis on the intermixing of identities and the “elasticity of racial definitions”, the new consciousness that emerges replicates racial hierarchies and dismisses calls for racial equality.

Through the lens of queer theory, literary scholar Ian Barnard contends that Anzaldúa’s Borderlands re-conceptualizes the binary between “queer” people of color and white “lesbian/gay” people in her theory of the “new mestiza”. Through this, Barnard argues that the book universalizes the queer experience, inviting queer people of all identity categories into this collective consciousness of the borderlands. Barnard notes that this universalization cannot be compared to white-centric depictions of multiculturalism as Anzaldúa references her own experiences as a Chicana and that of other racial minorities.

=== Indigeneity ===
Literary scholar Hsinya Huang highlights Borderlands/La Frontera's portrayal of indigeneity, arguing that Anzaldúa forefronts narratives of Indigenous identity often excluded within diasporic studies. Through depictions of pandemics nearly eradicating the Native American population, Huang argues that Anzaldúa “remaps the borderlands by following the movement of the diasporic bodies,” subverting colonial paradigms that have historically excluded Indigenous narratives. Huang also notes Anzaldúa's portrayal of the working Indigenous women along the borders facing economic, racial, and sexual oppression as a means to further confront colonialism through narration.

AnaLouise Keating, professor of Women and Gender Studies at Texas Woman's University, argues that Anzaldúa appropriates indigeneity in Borderlands, particularly in analogizing her experience to Native Americans and her self-depictions as a “shaman,” which she lent from the indigenous culture.

=== Immigration ===
Professor of Philosophy Amy Reed-Sandoval contends that Anzaldúa’s Borderlands portrayed “socially undocumented identity,” describing the deportation of an immigrant named Pedro who despite having been a U.S. Citizen, was coded as an immigrant due to his ethnic identity. Reed-Sandoval further draws on Borderlands’ descriptions of U.S territorial grabs after the Mexican-American War as a forced removal of the Mexican and Indigenous people to which the land originally belonged.

== Reception ==
The Library Journal recognized Borderlands as one of 38 Best Books of 1987.

=== Censorship ===
In 2010, Borderlands/La Frontera was one of the books banned by the Tucson Unified School System in Arizona when enforcing House Bill 2281, which prohibited the teaching of ethnic studies in the public school system. HB 2281's purpose was to prohibit school districts or other educational institutions from including any courses that were considered to “promote resentment towards a race or class of people” and many other provisions that targeted the ethnic studies programs that were already in existence.

=== Influence ===
Professor at the University of California Los Angeles Cati V. de Los Ríos analyzes the impact of Borderlands/La Frontera’s ban in the classroom and its implication for student identity. Ríos engaged in a case study of 35 eleventh- and twelfth-grade students in California and their experiences in a Chicano/Latino studies program utilizing a Borderlands-influenced curriculum that centered the experiences of racial minorities. She found that Borderlands and its incorporation into the course helped students confront their various social identities and navigate their educational endeavors.

== See also ==
- History of North America
- Culture of Mexico
- Chicano Movement
- Latino philosophy
- Spanglish

== Bibliography ==
- Amado, María L. (August 2012), "The "New Mestiza," the Old Mestizos: Contrasting Discourses on Mestizaje", Sociological Inquiry, 82 (3): 446–459, doi:10.1111/j.1475-682X.2012.00411.x.
- Anzaldúa, Gloria E. (1987), Borderlands/La Frontera: The New Mestiza, San Francisco: Aunt Lute Books.
- Anzaldúa, Gloria E. (2012), Borderlands/La Frontera: The New Mestiza, San Francisco: Aunt Lute Books, ISBN 978-1-879960-85-5.
- Barnard, Ian (March 1997), "Gloria Anzaldúa's Queer Mestisaje", MELUS, 22 (1): 35–53, doi:10.2307/468079, JSTOR 468079.
- Cabrera, Nolan L.; Meza, Elisa L.; Romero, Andrea J.; Cintli Rodríguez, Roberto (March 2013), "'If There is No Struggle, There is No Progress': Transformative Youth Activism and the School of Ethnic Studies", The Urban Review, 45 (1): 9, doi:10.1007/s11256-012-0220-7, ISSN 0042-0972, S2CID 143501883.
- Castillo-Garsow, Melissa (2012), "The Legacy of Gloria Anzaldúa: Finding a Place for Women of Color in Academia", Bilingual Review / La Revista Bilingüe, 31 (1): 3–11, ISSN 0094-5366, JSTOR 24705991.
- Huang, Hsinya (2015-12-31), "Indigeneity, Diaspora, and Ethical Turn in Anzaldúa's Borderlands/La Frontera", CLCWeb: Comparative Literature and Culture, 17 (5), doi:10.7771/1481-4374.2741, ISSN 1481-4374.
- Jones, Elizabeth; Jones, Elvin; Olson, Jessica; Teale, Rebecca; Curtright, Lauren (2005), "Gloria Anzaldúa", University of Minnesota, hdl:11299/167856.
- Keating, AnaLouise (2013), "Speculative Realism, Visionary Pragmatism, and Poet-Shamanic Aesthetics in Gloria Anzaldúa – and Beyond", WSQ: Women's Studies Quarterly, 40 (3–4): 51–69, doi:10.1353/wsq.2013.0020, ISSN 1934-1520, S2CID 84745269.
- Reed-Sandoval, Amy (2020-02-29), "The injustice of being socially undocumented", LasVegasSun.com
- Reuman, Ann E. (2000-06-01), "Coming Into Play: An Interview with Gloria Anzaldúa", MELUS, 25 (2): 3–45, doi:10.2307/468217, ISSN 0163-755X, JSTOR 468217.
- Román, Miriam Jiménez (2017), "Looking at that Middle Ground: Racial Mixing as Panacea?", in Juan Flores; Renato Rosaldo (eds.), A Companion to Latina/o Studies, John Wiley & Sons, pp. 325–336, doi:10.1002/9781405177603.ch29, ISBN 978-1-4051-7760-3.
- de los Ríos, Cati V. (March 2013), "A Curriculum of the Borderlands: High School Chicana/o-Latina/o Studies as Sitios y Lengua", The Urban Review, 45 (1): 58–73, doi:10.1007/s11256-012-0224-3, ISSN 0042-0972, S2CID 144218962.
