= Red Shoes (Choctaw chief) =

Choctaw chief (f.1740s)

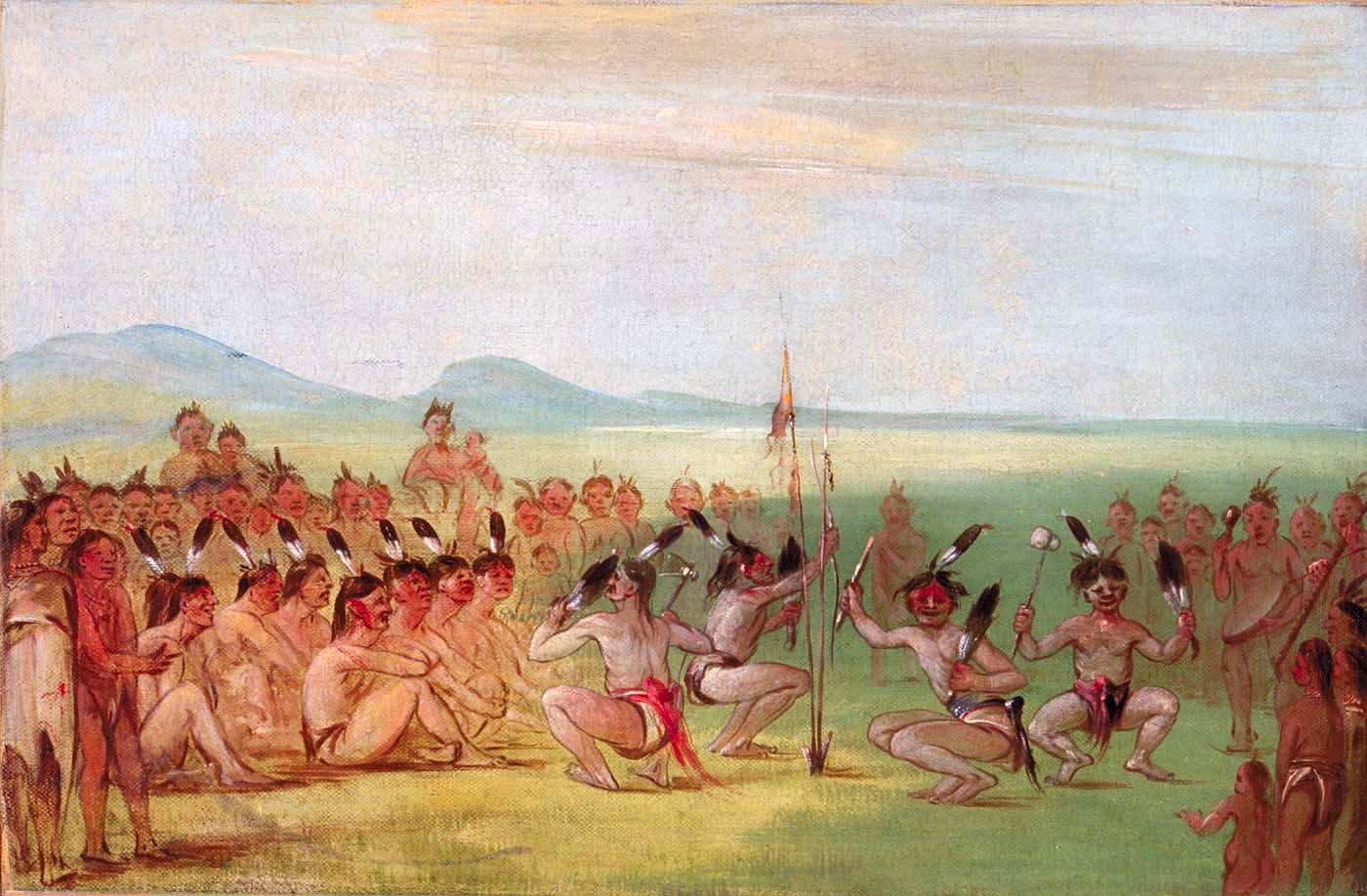
Eagle Dance, 1835-37, Smithsonian American Art Museum

Red Shoes (died June 1747) was a Choctaw chief who traded with British fur traders based in South Carolina in the 1740s and ignited the Choctaw Civil War. The French countered by arranging the assassination of Red Shoes. He was also known as Red Moccasin and was known in French as le Soulier Rouge.

== Background ==
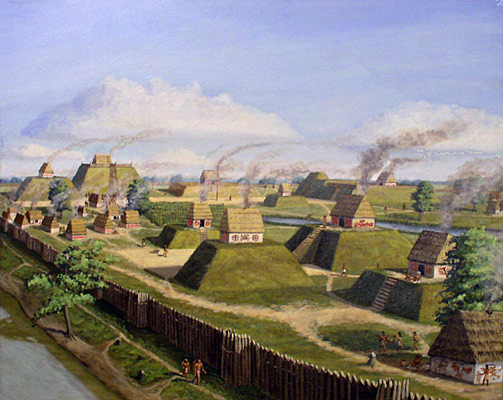
The Mississippian culture was a mound-building Native American culture that flourished in the Mississippi River valley before the arrival of Europeans.

The Choctaw once laid claim to millions of acres of land and established some 50 towns in present-day Mississippi and western Alabama. Their population was about 20,000 people scattered in these towns or villages.

The peoples who became known as the Choctaws (Chahtas) originally lived as separate societies throughout east-central Mississippi and west-central Alabama and all spoke dialects of the Muskogean language. The nation, in fact, was a league of independent principalities in which the weaker towns were often attached as dependencies to the stronger.

With European contact the world of the Mississippian culture turned upside down and nothing was the same. One leader, Red Shoes, moved to seize the opportunities offered by contact with the Europeans. The French of necessity had intimate dealings with the Choctaw from the time when Louisiana was first colonized, and the relations between the two peoples were usually friendly. But corruption, mismanagement and lack of supply eventually crippled the Native trade of French Louisiana. The hunters came away from the trading table with little to show, sometimes even empty handed, after months of hard work to obtain the deer hides and furs. They were angry and disappointed. They naturally looked elsewhere and found better recompense in the Muscogee and Chickasaw camps of their former enemies. This meant they were actually trading with British colonists who had sent the Chickasaw and Muscogee against them. Their leader, Mingo Tchito, turned a blind eye, but he was infuriated when the French could not supply the customary chief's gifts. These developments led to a pro-British party factions formed among the Choctaw, partly because the prices charged by British traders operating from the Carolinas were lower than those placed upon French goods. This effort was led by noted chief, Red Shoes, and lasted for a considerable time, culminating in his assassination and one of the principal Choctaw towns being burned to the ground before it came to an end with the defeat of the pro-British faction in 1750.

== Early life ==
Red Shoes began his adult life as a common warrior. He had no hereditary claim to Choctaw leadership. However, through his exploits as a daring warrior, he earned the distinction of the finest warrior the Choctaws ever produced. In later days it was said; "No one talked of anything but Red Shoes".

As a youth, Red Shoes learned that it was necessary to cooperate with the French if one wanted to escape being enslaved by Chickasaw and Muscogee slave raiding parties. These parties had forced thousands of Natives into slavery in order to sell them to white colonists residing in the Carolinas, killed thousands more and left the survivors to fend for themselves in a burned out, ravaged country.

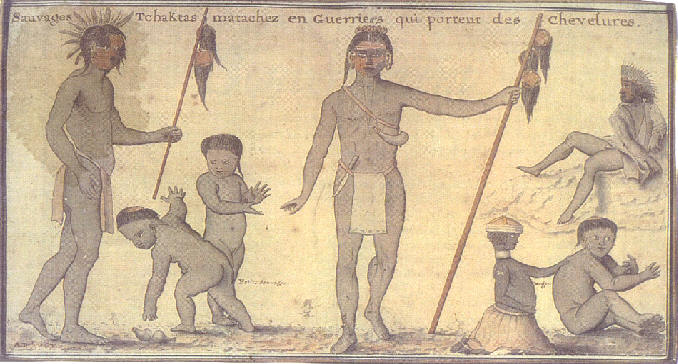
Watercolor painting by Alexandre de Batz. Choctaw, holding scalps, are painted for war. Early 1700s.

== Leadership role ==
In the early 1720s the Choctaws waged a fierce war with the Chickasaws, their bitter rivals and enemies. After the taking of many Chickasaw scalps, Shulush Homa stood in Couechitto town and received a new name, Soulouche Oumastabe. Eventually he rose to Red Shoes or war captain of Couechitto. Red Shoes became his name. It was the highest rank a man of common birth could hope to obtain. He was in his twenties when he began his rise to power which paralleled the decline of the head chief of Couechitto, Mingo Tchito and the dismantling of Choctaw power structure. Though both Red Shoes and Mingo Tchito, were equally shrewd, Mingo Tchito lacked his young rival's boldness and willingness to gamble everything. Mingo Tchito always hedged his bets. It was a very dangerous game of survival these two played and Red Shoes emerged as the leader after a series of crisis plagued Couechitto after 1729. Red Shoes did not act defensively nor was he a pawn of the Europeans. When he went over to British colonists it was upon his own terms. He could be treacherous and ruthless, but to be less meant destruction in those dangerous times.

Red Shoes, who hailed from the western division, opened trade with British fur traders based in South Carolina in the 1740s, their delegation being led by notable trader and historian James Adair and ignited the Choctaw Civil War when he killed some French traders. These killings were not wanton. They were in retaliation for wrongs against the Choctaw, possibly including rape and murder.

When the South Carolinians intrigued with Choctaw chief Red Shoes to win his large tribe away from French alliance, the French countered by arranging Red Shoes' assassination.

== Betrayal ==
In June 1747, a pack train bearing British presents from Charles Town approached the Choctaw Nation. Red Shoes took a party to escort the traders to Couechitto. He never returned. On June 23, 1747, he felt sick and made his camp away from the main party keeping only one retainer. The man who volunteered for this duty was the man the French had bribed to kill him. As he slept, that man took out a knife, murdered Red Shoes for the French price on his head, and slipped into the night.

In the aftermath of his assassination, more tragedy ensued as the event sparked the Choctaw Civil War. A substantial number of towns returned to the French, plunging the Choctaw into the ever-widening civil war. 800 warriors died in the ruins of their towns or in the woods where they were hunted down. Rivalries over trade with France and Britain caused the rift in Choctaw society, primarily between the western and eastern divisions, that lasted from 1747 to 1750.

Eastern-division forces allied with France prevailed in the conflict and burned several western-division towns to the ground. Hundreds of Choctaws died during the war, which revealed deep divisions in the confederacy.

Red Shoes had sought much more than personal gain. He had a vision that the Choctaws would benefit from the advantages the Europeans brought without falling under their rule. Retaining his independence, he made his own terms. He adapted, survived and prospered for a time.

Even his death transformed the Choctaw Nation. After the conflict, Choctaw leaders worked to end inter-ethnic animosities and unite their peoples more closely.

== In popular culture ==
Shell Shaker is a novel by LeAnne Howe. The early tale, beginning in 1738 in pre-removal Choctaw Mississippi, tells the story of Red Shoes. This story is paralleled by a modern-day murder mystery also based on a true story.

== Notable descendants ==
- Atahobia - signer of the Treaty of Doak's Stand in 1820, as one of the Chiefs and Headmen of the Choctaw. One of, if not the primary leader of the Yowanis who moved into Texas following their petition of the Mexican government for permission to settle in the province in 1824.
- James Neely McCoy - Supreme Judge of the Chickasaw Nation in Indian Territory
