= Dan Vera =

American poet and editor

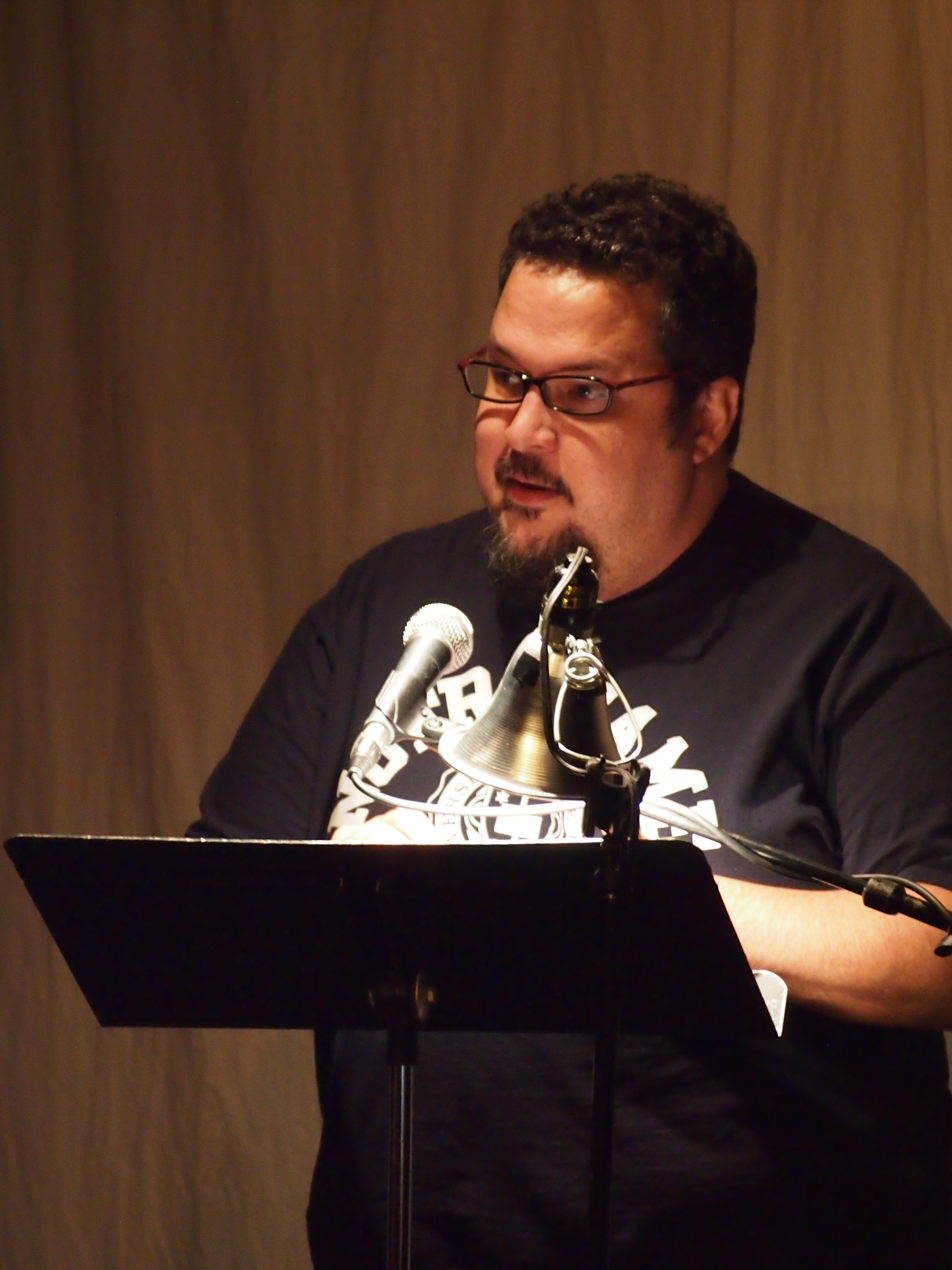
- Dan Vera reading at Iota Poetry Series 20th anniversary.
- Born: South Texas
- Occupations: Poet, Editor
- Writing career
- Genre: Poetry
- Website: danvera.com

Dan Vera (born South Texas) is an American poet and editor.

== Career ==
Vera is the author of Speaking Wiri Wiri, (Red Hen Press, 2013) and The Space Between Our Danger and Delight, (Beothuk Books, 2009). His manuscript The Guide to Imaginary Monuments was selected by Orlando Ricardo Menes for the 2012 Letras Latinas/Red Hen Poetry Prize and published as Speaking Wiri Wiri.

His work has appeared in Poetry, The American Prospect, Foreign Policy in Focus, Poet Lore, Beltway Poetry Quarterly, Notre Dame Review, Delaware Poetry Review, Gargoyle Magazine, Konch, and Red Wheelbarrow.

Vera's poetry blends English and Spanish. As he explains:

I love the English language. And I think one of the things that I love about the English language is the permeability of English to not only accept but also struggle with the incorporation of other languages like Spanish. So when I write, I'm constantly going back and forth between these two possible ways of articulating the world around me.

He publishes other poets through Vrzhu Press and Souvenir Spoon Books. Vera is the co-editor, with ire'ne lara silva, of an essay anthology about Gloria Anzaldúa, Imaniman: Poets Writing in the Anzaldúan Borderlands, (Aunt Lute Books, 2016).

He founded Brookland Area Writers & Artists and serves on the boards of Split This Rock Poetry and Rainbow History Project. His work as co-editor with Kim Roberts of the literary history site D.C. Writers' Homes was part of his effort to get to know Washington D.C.:

I was just really fascinated to discover that writing and writers had existed in D.C. before me. I live in the Brookland neighborhood, and was fascinated to find out that Sterling Brown lived a few blocks from me and wanted to know more about him — that kind of started a progression of interest in writers, playwrights and poets and novelists who called Washington home.

Vera is a member of the Macondo Writers Workshop, a workshop founded by Sandra Cisneros. and a fellow of the CantoMundo Poetry Workshop.

== Personal life ==
He lives in the Brookland neighborhood of Washington, D.C.

== Works ==
=== Poetry collections ===
- Speaking Wiri Wiri. Red Hen Press. March 2013. ISBN 978-1-59709-274-6.
- The Space Between Our Danger and Delight. Beothuk Books. March 28, 2009. ISBN 978-0-615-25371-8.

=== Poetry in anthologies ===
- America's Future Poetry & Prose in Response to Tomorrow. Washington Writers' Publishing House. 2025. ISBN 978-1-941551-52-3.
- Latino Poetry: The Library of America Anthology (LOA #382). Penguin Random House. September 3, 2024. ISBN 978-1598537833.
- Ghost Fishing: An Eco-Justice Poetry Anthology. University of Georgia Press. 2018. ISBN 978-0820353159.
- The Traveler's Vade Mecum. Red Hen Press. October 10, 2016. ISBN 978-1597092241.
- The Queer South: LGBTQ Writers on the American South. Sibling Rivalry Press. September 16, 2014. ISBN 978-1-937420-80-2.
- Divining Divas: 100 Gay Men on their Muses. Lethe Press.
- Gratitude Prayers. Andrews McMeel. February 2013. ISBN 978-1449421762.
- Full Moon On K Street: Poems About Washington, DC. Plan B Press. December 1, 2010.
- Dog Blessings. New World Library. October 1, 2008. ISBN 978-1-57731-616-9.
- D.C. Poets Against The War. Argonne House Press. 2004. ISBN 1-887641-98-X.

=== As editor ===
- Imaniman: Poets Writing in the Anzaldúan Borderlands. Aunt Lute Books. 2016. ISBN 9781879960930., with ire'ne lara silva and an introduction by United States Poet Laureate Juan Felipe Herrera
- A Prophet in His Own Land: A Malcolm Boyd Reader. White Crane Wisdom. 2008. ISBN 978-1590210116., with Malcolm Boyd and Bo Young
