= Jane Shore (poet) =

American poet

- Education: Goddard College; University of Iowa
- Occupation: Poet
- Spouse: Howard Norman (m. 1984)
- Children: 1

Jane Shore is an American poet.

== Life ==
She graduated from Goddard College, and moved from Vermont to the Iowa Writers' Workshop. She graduated from Radcliffe College in 1972, where she was a student of Elizabeth Bishop.

Shore met Howard Norman in 1981, and they married in 1984. They have a daughter, Emma (born 1988).

Norman and Shore lived in Cambridge, New Jersey, Oahu, and Vermont, before settling into homes in Chevy Chase, Maryland near Washington, D.C. during the school year, and East Calais, Vermont in the summertime. Their friend, the author David Mamet and Shore's Goddard College classmate, lives nearby.

During the summer of 2003, poet Reetika Vazirani was housesitting the Normans' Chevy Chase home. There, on July 16, she killed her young son before committing suicide.

== Career ==
She has edited Ploughshares, and her poems have been published in numerous magazines, including Poetry, The New Republic, and The Yale Review

She was Radcliffe Institute, fellow in poetry, 1971–73, and Briggs-Copeland Lecturer in English at Harvard University, 1973—, and Jenny McKean Moore Writer at George Washington University in Washington, D.C. She was visiting distinguished poet at the University of Hawaii.

She is currently a professor at the George Washington University.

== Awards ==
- Eye Level, winner of the 1977 Juniper Prize
- The Minute Hand, awarded the 1986 Lamont Poetry Prize
- Music Minus One, a finalist for the 1996 National Book Critic Circle Award
- 1991 Guggenheim Fellowship
- two grants from the N.E.A.
- fellow in poetry at the Mary Ingraham Bunting Institute
- Alfred Hodder Fellow at Princeton University
- Goodyear Fellow at the Foxcroft School in Virginia

== Bibliography ==
=== Poetry collections ===
- Shore, Jane (1969). Lying Down in the Olive Press. Goddard Journal Press.
- — (1977). Eye Level. University of Massachusetts Press (Amherst). ISBN 978-0-87023-246-6.
- — (1987). The Minute Hand. University of Massachusetts Press. ISBN 978-0-87023-570-2.
- — (1996). Music Minus One. New York City: Picador USA. ISBN 978-0-312-16944-2.
- — (1999). Happy Family: Poems. Picador USA. ISBN 978-0-312-20310-8.
- — (2008). A yes-or-no answer : poems. Houghton Mifflin Harcourt. ISBN 978-0-547-00603-1.
- — (2012). That said : new and selected poems. Houghton Mifflin Harcourt. ISBN 9780547687117.

=== Anthologies ===
- Catherine Cucinella, ed. (2002). Contemporary American women poets. Greenwood Press. ISBN 978-0-313-31783-5.
- Robert Pack, Jay Parini, ed. (2002). "Public Service is Rich Enough". Contemporary poetry of New England. UPNE. ISBN 978-0-87451-966-2.

=== Poems ===
Title	Year	First published	Reprinted/collected in
This one	2013	Shore, Jane (September 30, 2013). "This one". The New Yorker. Vol. 89, no. 30. p. 31.	
My mother's foot	2005	"My mother's foot". Ploughshares. 98. Winter 2005–2006.	
Candles	2005	"Candles". Ploughshares. 98. Winter 2005–2006.	
Monday	1988	"Monday". Ploughshares. 47. Winter 1988.	
A yes-or-no answer	2008	Shore, Jane (2008). A yes-or-no answer : poems. Houghton Mifflin Harcourt. ISBN 978-0-547-00603-1. ???	"Jane Shore's Poem 'A Yes-or-No Answer'". GW English News. George Washington University. Department of English. April 30, 2008.
Buying a star	2001	"[Poems by Jane Shore]". Beltway Poetry Quarterly. 2 (2). Spring 2001.	
Driving lesson	2001	"[Poems by Jane Shore]". Beltway Poetry Quarterly. 2 (2). Spring 2001.	
Missing	2001	"[Poems by Jane Shore]". Beltway Poetry Quarterly. 2 (2). Spring 2001.	
Evil eye	2001	"[Poems by Jane Shore]". Beltway Poetry Quarterly. 2 (2). Spring 2001.	
The slap	2001	"[Poems by Jane Shore]". Beltway Poetry Quarterly. 2 (2). Spring 2001.	
Who knows one	2018	Shore, Jane (April 2, 2018). "Who knows one". The New Yorker. Vol. 94, no. 7. pp. 70–71.	
The couple	2020	Shore, Jane (September 7, 2020). "The couple". The New Yorker. Vol. 96, no. 26. pp. 42–43.	
