= Robert Sargent =

Robert Sargent may refer to:

- Robert S. Sargent (1912–2006), electrical engineer, weapons specialist and poet
- Robert F. Sargent (1923–2012), Chief Photographer's Mate in the United States Coast Guard
