= Martin Luther Thompson =

Martin Luther Thompson was a Texas Choctaw leader and rancher who along with his relatives, William Clyde Thompson (1839–1912)

== Background ==
Dr. Douglas Hale wrote Martin L. Thompson had been chosen the leader of the Choctaws at Mount Taber in 1885 to represent the Yowani Choctaw descendants in the Chickasaw Nation, in their attempt to attain citizenship by blood in the Choctaw Nation.

For Martin L. Thompson, family, ranching and oil would consume the remainder of his life.

Although his family was not able to be listed as citizens by blood on the Final Rolls of the Choctaw Nation, his return to Texas was for the best. Oil was discovered on his land and by the time of his death he was one of the wealthiest Choctaw-Chickasaws in the United States.

== See also ==
- William Clyde Thompson
- Yowani Choctaws
- Treaty of Birds Fort
- Chickasaw Nation

== Notes ==
=== Sources ===
- William C. Thompson, et al. vs. Choctaw Nation, MCR File 341, Bureau of Indian Affairs, Muskogee, Oklahoma
- United States Department of the Interior, Secretary of the Interior-Choctaw Citizenship Cases, #4 William C. Thompson et al., pgs 151-157
- Department of the Interior, Office of Indian Affairs correspondence between A.C. Tonner, Acting Commissioner for the Dawes Commission, and the Secretary of the Interior, April 29, 1904; ref. Land 25846-1904-Oklahoma Historical Society
- Frederick Webb Hodge, ed., Handbook of American Indians North of Mexico (2 vols., Washington: GPO, 1907, 1910, rpt., New York: Pageant, 1959)
- A History of the Caddo Indians by William B. Glover, The Louisiana Historical Quarterly, Vol. 18, No. 4. October, 1935
- Oklahoma Historical Society, Records of the Department of the Interior, Laws, Decisions and Regulations Affecting the work of the Commissioner to the Five Civilized Tribes 1893-1906 pgs 130-138
- The Dawes Commission and the Allotment of the Five Civilized Tribes, 1893-1914 By Kent Carter, Ancestry Publishing 1999, ISBN 0-916489-85-X, 13:978-0916489854
- Handbook of American Indians North of Mexico By Frederick Webb Hodge, Smithsonian Institution American Ethnology, Washington, D. C.: Government Printing Office, 1907, pgs 1001–1002, ISBN 0-313-21281-3; 13:978-0313212819
- Letter regarding Choctaw Citizenship: E.A. Newman, Broker; J.M. Humphreys, Attorney, Atoka, I.T. 2/15/1906, Martin Thompson, Overton, Texas
- Dallas Morning News, Sunday, March 8, 1940, "Owns Prerevolutionary Bible"
- LWT, Martin L. Thompson 1946, Smith County Probate Records, Smith County, Texas
