= Kim Roberts =

Kim Roberts may refer to:

- Kim Roberts (poet) (born 1961), American poet
- Kim Roberts (actress), Canadian actress
- Kim Roberts (filmmaker), American filmmaker
