= Kim Roberts (poet) =

American poet (born 1961)

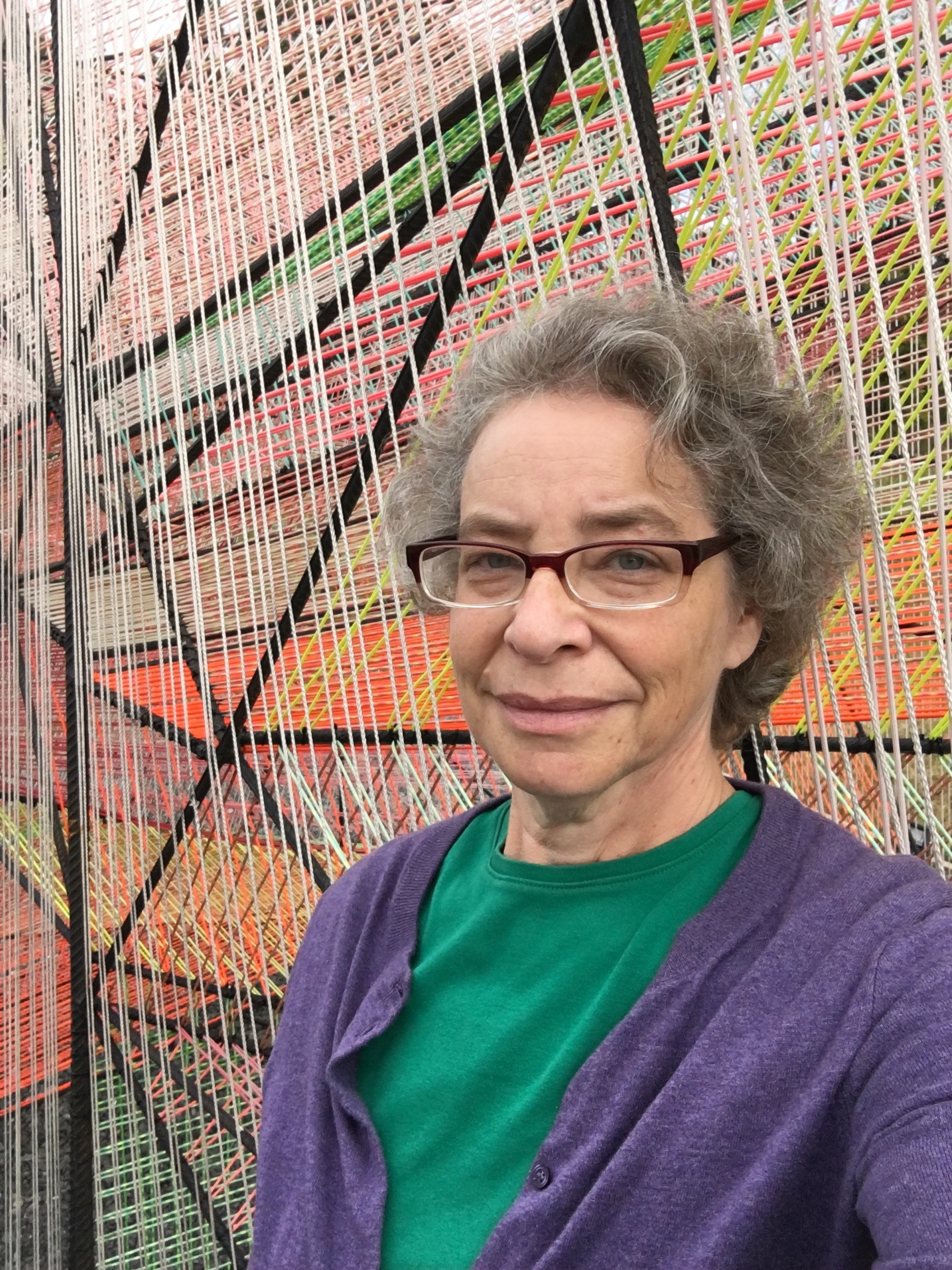
- Kim Roberts, 2019
- Born: Charlotte, North Carolina; United States
- Education: Emerson College; University of Arizona
- Occupations: Poet; editor; essayist

Kim Roberts (born 1961) is an American poet, editor, and literary historian who lives in Washington, D.C.

== Early life and education ==
Roberts was born in Charlotte, North Carolina. She received a BFA from Emerson College and an MFA from the University of Arizona.

== Career ==
She is the editor of the anthologies By Broad Potomac's Shore: Great Poems from the Early Days of Our Nation's Capital (University of Virginia Press, 2020), and Full Moon On K Street: Poems About Washington DC (Plan B Press, 2010), and author of five books of poetry, including The Scientific Method (WordTech Editions, 2017), Animal Magnetism (Pearl Editions, 2011), and The Wishbone Galaxy (Washington Writers Publishing House, 1994). The Kimnama (Vrzhu Press/Poetry Mutual, 2007) is a book-length poem that chronicles her experiences during a period of residence in India. Fortune's Favor: Scott In Antarctica (Poetry Mutual Press, 2015) is a book-length poem based on the journals of British explorer Robert Falcon Scott, whose Terra Nova Expedition was the second to reach the South Pole in 1912. Her work has been published in numerous anthologies and literary journals throughout the US, and internationally.

Roberts is also the author of A Literary Guide to Washington, DC: Walking in the Footsteps of American Writers from Francis Scott Key to Zora Neale Hurston (University of Virginia Press, 2018). With Dan Vera, she co-curates the web exhibit DC Writers' Homes, sponsored by Humanities DC.

She is the founder of two literary journals. She established Beltway Poetry Quarterly in January 2000, and served as editor for twenty years, through January 2020. She co-founded the Delaware Poetry Review in 2007 (which published through 2017).

Roberts has seen her work adapted to music by Arc of Ones, as well as by classical composer Daron Aric Hagen. Several poems have been choreographed by Jane Franklin Dance Company and performed at various venues including the Kennedy Center Millennium Stage. Roberts' science and poetry workshops at the 2017 March for Science were featured in The New York Times Opinion page and the title poem of her book The Scientific Method was included at the march as part of "Science Stanzas," sponsored by the Wick Poetry Center at Kent State University. She has been featured in the Academy of American Poets' Poem-a-Day Project, and in podcasts sponsored by the Library of Congress and the National Endowment for the Arts, and individual poems of hers have been translated into Spanish, Portuguese, German, and Mandarin.

Washington, D.C. is the source of much inspiration for Roberts. She has developed numerous tours for schools, community groups, and Big Read celebrations highlighting the literary and cultural history of the city. Roberts frequently leads walking tours of the Harlem Renaissance-era writers in the greater U Street neighborhood. Roberts's research on Walt Whitman's decade in residence of Washington, DC was featured in The Walt Whitman Quarterly Review, as well as being referenced in subsequent articles in The Washington Post and The Washington Times, featured on radio essays on stations WAMU and WPFW, and on panels for Whitman conferences at Rutgers University, the Kennedy Center for the Performing Arts, and at the annual Washington Historical Studies Conference. Roberts was the Festival Director of the "Walt Whitman 200 Festival" in 2019, sponsored by Humanities DC, and Coordinator of the 2005 city-wide festival, "DC Celebrates Whitman: 150 Years of Leaves of Grass." Roberts has presented "The Rise of DC's Black Intelligentsia: Paul Laurence Dunbar and Alice Dunbar-Nelson in LeDroit Park" and "Henry Adams in Lafayette Square" at DC Historical Studies Conferences. Her projects have been supported by the National Endowment for the Arts, Humanities DC, the DC Commission on the Arts and Humanities, the District of Columbia Public Library, and a Rose Research Fellowship at Emory University.

== Awards ==
Roberts is the winner of the 2009 Pearl Poetry Prize for her manuscript, Animal Magnetism. In 2010, she won the Washington Online Award for "Contributions to the DC Literary Community." In 2008, she was awarded an Independent Voice Award from the Capital BookFest. Roberts is the recipient of grants from the National Endowment for the Humanities, the DC Commission on the Arts and Humanities, and Humanities DC. She has been awarded writer's residencies at eighteen artist colonies across the United States, including Art Omi International Arts Center, the Pine Needles Fellowship from the Science Museum of Minnesota, the Edward Albee Foundation, the Helene Wurlitzer Foundation, Virginia Center for the Creative Arts, and the Ucross Foundation.

== Bibliography ==
=== Poetry ===
- The Scientific Method. (WordTech Editions). 2017. ISBN 978-1625492166. Archived from the original on 2021-09-27.
- Fortune's Favor: Scott In Antarctica. (Poetry Mutual Press). 2015. ISBN 978-1-329-00621-8.
- Animal Magnetism (Pearl Editions). 2011. ISBN 9781888219388
- The Kimnama. (Poetry Mutual Press/Vrzhu Press). 2007. ISBN 978-1-4303-1407-3.
- The Wishbone Galaxy. (Washington Writers Publishing House). 1994. ISBN 978-0-931846-45-8.

=== Anthologies (Editor) ===
- By Broad Potomac's Shore: Great Poems from the Early Days of Our Nation's Capital (University of Virginia Press). 2020. ISBN 9780813944753.
- Full Moon On K Street: Poems About Washington, DC. (Plan B Press). 2010. ISBN 978-0-9778243-6-6.

=== Plays ===
- The Distressway (2006)
- I'll Give You Flowers (2006)
- Dave's Birthday (2001)
- The Language of Love: An Exploration of the Alphabet in Twenty-Six Parts (1997)
- America (1995)
- Sex and the Symbol Woman with Kathy Keler (1992)

=== Non-fiction ===
- A Literary Guide to Washington, DC: Walking in the Footsteps of American Writers from Francis Scott Key to Zora Neale Hurston (2018) ISBN 9780813941172.
- Lip Smack: A History of Spoken Word Poetry in DC (Beltway Editions). 2010.

=== Tours and web exhibits ===
- DC Writers' Homes, co-editor with Dan Vera (2011)
- Henry Adams in Lafayette Square (2011)
- Wide Enough for Our Ambition: DC's Segregated African American Schools (1807–1954) (2010)
- New Deal Washington (2009)
- Jazz Age Stories of the Rich & Scandalous! (2008)
- Zora Neale Hurston's Washington (2007)
- Mid-Atlantic Medical Museums, Academic Internal Medicine Insight (2006)
- The Harlem Renaissance in D.C. (2005)
- Whitman In DC: Gay DC Walking Tours Co-written with Martin G. Murray (2005)
- WALKArlington in Rosslyn Walking Tour (2004)

=== Special projects ===
- "Swamp," Goethe-Institut Washington
