= Choctaw Civil War =

War fought between 1747 and 1750 within the Choctaw nation

- Part of the American Indian Wars
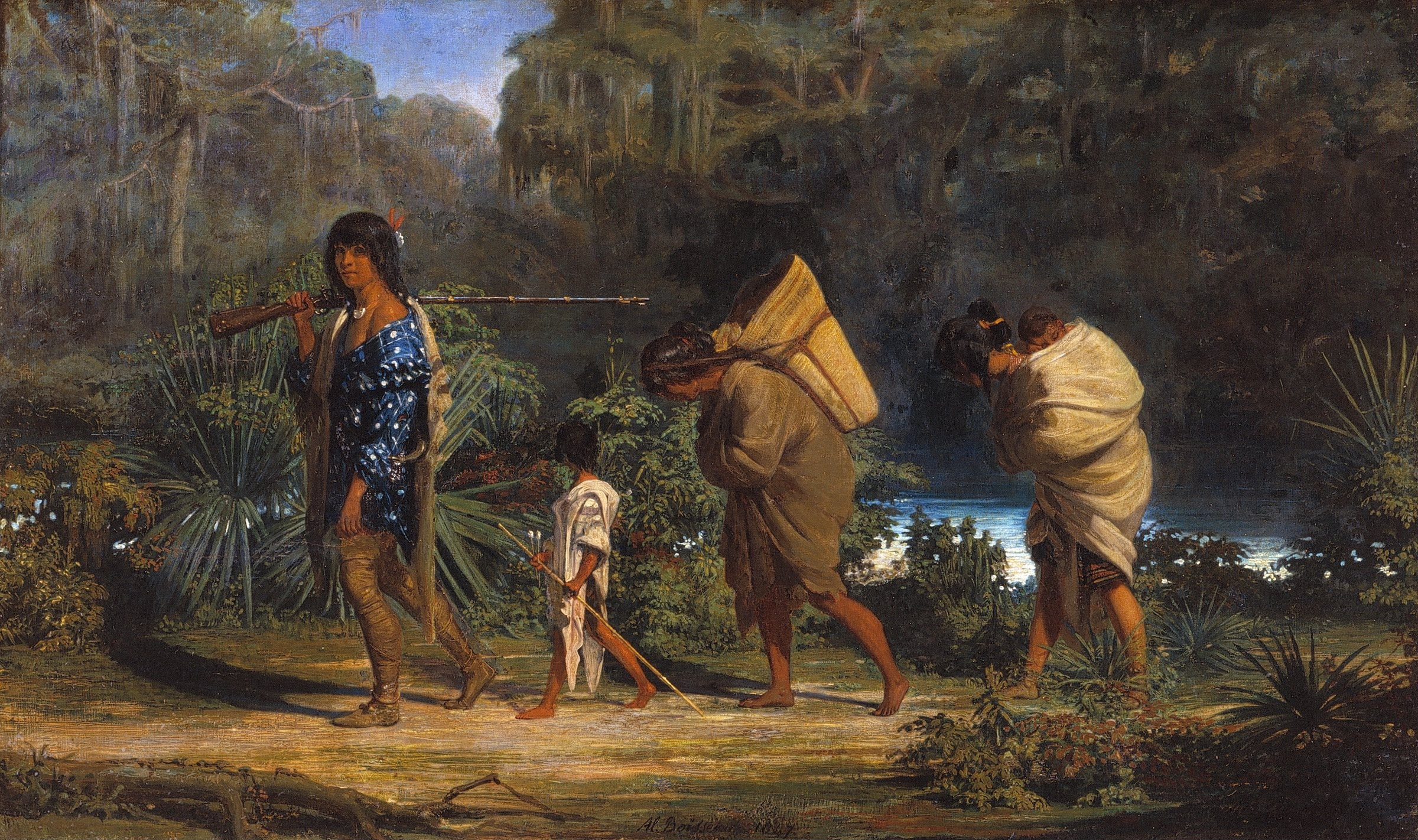
- Louisiana Indians Walking Along a Bayou (Alfred Boisseau, 1847)
| Date | 1747–1750 |
| Location | American Southeast |
| Result | Eastern Division victory: Choctaw trade with the British severed; Choctaw relations with the French strengthened; Choctaw political and economic power remains in eastern territory |

Belligerents
| Choctaw Eastern Division; Supported by: Louisiana | Choctaw Western Division; Supported by: South Carolina; North Carolina; Chakchiuma; Chickasaw |

The Choctaw Civil War was a period of economic and social unrest among the Choctaw people that degenerated into a civil war between 1747 and 1750. Fought between two different factions within the Choctaw, the conflict was sparked by bitter disagreements on whether the Choctaw would trade with British or French colonists. Hundreds of Choctaw died in the war and the pro-French faction retained their influence within the Choctaw nation.

== Background ==
Residing in Mississippi, Louisiana, and Alabama, by the early 18th century the Choctaw people were under threat from a number of regional rivals. The Choctaw warred intermittently with the Chickasaw to the north, while the Muscogee frequently raided the western Choctaw territories, with both tribes enslaving thousands of Choctaws to sell to white colonists in the Carolinas and West Indies. These rival tribes had purchased firearms from the colonists (by exchanging them for war captives), allowing them to gain a military advantage over the Choctaw.

Faced with these threats, the Choctaw themselves began to militarize, and, using money brought in from the growing fur trade, began to buy firearms from French colonists who had settled in Louisiana. The Choctaw also organized themselves into rough political units described as "divisions". Two divisions eventually rose to dominate Choctaw politics, the Eastern Division (the Okla Tannap, or People of the Opposite Side) and the Western Division (the Okla Falaya, the Long People). A third, smaller division (the Okla Hannali, the People of Sixtowns) known as the Southern Division also existed, but its members often isolated themselves from the affairs of the other two divisions and remained neutral in the Choctaw dispute over alliances.

Friendly relations between the Choctaw and French colonists in Louisiana continued into the 1730s; the Choctaw saw the French as a valuable economic partner (trading furs for guns, offering guides for hire, and as a market for enslaved prisoners), while the French viewed their alliance with the Choctaw as vital to the defending Louisiana from potential attacks from the British and their Chickasaw allies.

British colonists attempted to establish trade relations with the Eastern Division in 1731, but this effort failed when another war broke out between the Choctaw and the Chickasaw later that year. Despite this failure, the French were wary of any encroachment by the British traders, fearing that the British were attempting to undermine the French alliance with the Choctaw. As such, the French greatly strengthened their military ties to the Choctaw, building Fort Tombecbe in Choctaw territory and conducting a joint Choctaw–French expedition to destroy Chickasaw villages on the Tombigbee river in 1736.

By the late 1730s the Choctaw military situation had stabilized (fighting would continue against the remaining Chickasaw into the 1760s), and the fur trade continued to increase the wealth of the Choctaw people. The various tribes remained on friendly terms with the French, while the presence of British colonists in Choctaw lands was tolerated. By 1740, the Choctaw numbered some 12,000 people living in around 50 villages.

== Civil war ==
During the wars with the Chickasaw, a Choctaw warrior known as Red Shoes rose to prominence. Although he was not born into one of the hereditary chiefdoms that made up the Choctaw nation, Red Shoes was able to rise to the position of war-captain due to his war-won fame. He eventually became chief of the town of Couechitto, which soon grew wealthy due to its involvement with the fur trade. However, after several years of lackluster trading with the French, Red Shoes decided to enter trade negotiations with British colonists instead. Red Shoe's trading with the British threatened to damage the tribe's relations with the French, and when it was discovered the chief was widely chastised by other Choctaw leaders. However, Red Shoes continued to trade with the British, even going so far as to lead a delegation to Charleston. Red Shoes found that the British were willing to sell guns and other goods to the Choctaw at lower prices than the French were, and soon the chief (who was affiliated with the Western Division) established a solid trading relationship with the British, allowing him access to more wealth, weapons, and political power. Though he had fought alongside the French against the Chickasaw, his observation of the French Tombigbee expedition (which had suffered heavy casualties) convinced him that the Louisiana colony was militarily weak. He also considered allying his large tribe with British colonists in the Carolinas. In addition, Red Shoes sought to enter peace negotiations with the Chickasaw, an idea which many Choctaw and French leaders strongly opposed.

Red Shoes' shift in policy and growing political power caused political discord within the Choctaw, and by the late 1730s tensions were rising between the eastern and western divisions. Small-scale fighting between Choctaw villages began in November 1739, and while this was quickly stopped through inter-tribal mediation it showed the increasing divides in Choctaw society. 1742 was a bloody year in the war against the Chickasaw, and a smallpox outbreak in the summer of that year killed many Choctaw children and elders. Fields went unattended - many farmers having been recruited for war parties - leading to a food shortage, and the movement of Choctaw warriors throughout the people's territory helped to spread disease. In 1743, the newly appointed governor of Louisiana, Pierre de Rigaud (seeking to cut the colony's expenses) decreased the annual gifts given to the Choctaw leaders and imposed new trading restrictions on French manufactured goods. These changes harmed the longstanding Choctaw-French trading relationship, and further convinced the Western Division that the British would make better trading partners.

In 1746, a trio of French traders in Couechitto were captured and executed (possibly in retaliation for raping a Choctaw woman) by warriors loyal to Red Shoes. Soon after, the Western Division expelled all traders from their territory. This development greatly angered the Eastern Division and their French allies, and leaders from the two groups soon met to discuss military action against the Western Division. The French also sent envoys to the Western Division, but were told by pro-French chiefs that they lacked the power to destroy Red Shoes and his pro-British supporters.

With war imminent, the French conspired to assassinate Red Shoes, offering a large bounty on him. On the night of 23 June 1747 a young Choctaw warrior acting as an escort for a British merchant assassinated Red Shoes in his sleep, plunging Red Shoe's tribe into chaos. His faction did not dissolve, however, and when French complicity with the assassination was later discovered many tribes affiliated with the Western Division demanded revenge. The situation was further inflamed by the French, who demanded the deaths of two additional Western Division chiefs as recompense for the three slain Frenchmen. The eastern and western divisions did not attack each-other immediately, instead choosing to target their respective allies, but when a western-aligned chief was killed in an eastern raid on a British trading caravan, open war broke out. The first major action of the war came in July 1748 when the Eastern Division launched a raid on Couechitto, Red Chief's former village.

The war itself was bloody and chaotic, with both sides attacking each other's villages and towns. Raids were common, and due to the dispersed nature of Choctaw settlements, entire villages were often slaughtered before their respective division could arrive to aid them. Hundreds of Choctaws were killed. Both sides were armed by their respective European allies, with the British backing the Western Division and the French supporting the Eastern Division. Using Fort Tombecbe as a base, the French sent colonial troops to aid their eastern allies in battle, offering three times the pre-war price for enemy scalps. The Eastern Division possessed a numerical advantage over the Western Division, and this allowed the former faction to wear down their opponent through a brutal war of attrition. Benefiting from their pre-war diplomacy, the Western Division allied themselves with the Chakchiuma and the Chickasaw. With British support, the Western Division launched an unsuccessful attack on the key eastern-aligned town of Oulitacha that cost the lives of over 100 warriors from both sides. The Western Division won a few minor victories, but by 1750 a number of devastating raids had sapped the ability of the Western Division to wage war, and the disruption caused to the fur trade by the conflict had collapsed the economies of both factions. The Western Division was also running critically low on supplies, as the end of King George's War (1744–1748) had reduced the British need to undermine French Louisiana; according to one anecdote given by a British trader, the Western Division was so short on ammunition they were resorting to firing glass beads.

Faced with defeat, the Western Division signed a peace treaty in November 1750. The surviving Choctaw leaders concluded a treaty favorable to the Eastern Division and the French. Under the terms of said treaty, the Choctaw promised to avenge the death of any Frenchmen with the death of a rebel Choctaw, kill any remaining British merchants and their Choctaw supporters in Choctaw lands, and continue the war against the Chickasaw. The Western Division was also forced to destroy fortified settlements in their territory and exchange prisoners.

=== Aftermath ===
The war left hundreds of Choctaws dead. Dozens of villages were destroyed, and many more were damaged or depopulated. With the Eastern Division established as the dominant force among the Choctaw people, the faction ended trade with Britain and returned to the pre-war trade with the French. However, the war also caused the Choctaw to re-evaluate their relations with the European powers; in the postwar years, the Choctaw adopted a flexible, pragmatic stance towards Britain, France, and Spain, eventually resulting in the Choctaw supporting Britain in the Seven Years' War and both Britain and Spain during the American Revolutionary War.

== In literature ==
The leadup to the civil war plays a role in LeAnne Howe's 2001 novel Shell Shaker.

== See also ==
- Mississippian shatter zone
