= Leslie McGrath =

American poet, editor, and educator

Leslie McGrath (June 15, 1957 – August 7, 2020) was an American poet, editor, and educator. Critic Grace Cavalieri called McGrath “an oral historian of the alienated." She authored the poetry collection Feminists Are Passing from Our Lives (The Word Works, 2018); Out From the Pleiades: a picaresque novella in verse (Jaded Ibis Press, 2014), and Opulent Hunger, Opulent Rage (Main St. Rag, 2009), a finalist for the 2010 Connecticut Book Award for Poetry;. She received the Pablo Neruda Prize for Poetry in 2004, and taught at Central Connecticut State University from 2009 - 2019. She published three chapbooks: By the Windpipe (ELJ Editions, 2014); the satiric novella in verse, Out From the Pleiades (Jaded Ibis Press, 2014); andToward Anguish, which won the 2007 Philbrick Poetry Award. Her most recent publication is a full-length collection of poetry Feminists Are Passing from Our Lives (Word Works 2018). McGrath co-edited Reetika Vazirani's posthumous poetry collection, Radha Says: Last

Poems (Drunken Boat Books, 2010).

== Recognition ==
In addition to the honors noted above, McGrath was awarded the University of Tulsa's 2004 Pablo Neruda Prize for Poetry, a 2007 Artist Fellowship from the Connecticut Commission on Culture and Tourism, a 2010 grant from the Greater Hartford Arts Council, residencies at the Vermont Studio Center and Hedgebrook, and the 2017 Gretchen Warren Award from The New England Poetry Club.

Her literary interviews have been published in Association of Writers & Writing Programs's official magazine, The Writer's Chronicle. Her poems have been published widely, including in Agni, Poetry magazine, The Academy of American Poets, The Writer’s Chronicle, and The Yale Review. An interview with McGrath about her work appears in The Nervous Breakdown. McGrath served on the advisory board for The Word Works, a literary press in Washington, D.C., which sponsors The Washington Prize. She was also the series editor for the Word Works' Tenth Gate Series, an imprint inspired by poet Jane Hirshfield, which recognizes the work of mid-career poets.

McGrath served on the Poetry Advisory Committee of Sunken Garden Poetry Series at the Hill-Stead Museum in Farmington, Connecticut, and formerly served on the board of The James Merrill House in Stonington, Connecticut.
