= Robert S. Sargent =

American poet

Robert S. Sargent (1912–2006) was an electrical engineer, Defense Department defensive weapons specialist, and published poet who lived most of his adult life in Washington, DC.

== Early life, education and military service ==
Sargent was born in New Orleans in 1912, raised in Mississippi, and was a 1933 graduate of Mississippi State University. He also did graduate work at Bowdoin College in Maine, where he worked on the early development of radar, and the Massachusetts Institute of Technology. After serving in the Navy during World War II, he worked at the Pentagon from the late 1940s until 1972. During his time at the Pentagon he was the recipient of the Distinguished Civilian Service Award.

== Literary career ==
Sargent began writing poetry in his fifties and published 11 books of poetry. Sargent's literary subjects included his family, the American South, art, love, the Bible, and jazz. His poems were published in a number of literary journals, including Antioch Review, New York Quarterly, Georgia Review, Poetry Review, Prairie Schooner, Western Humanities Review and many others. His poems also appeared in a number of anthologies, including Poetry magazine's The Poetry Anthology. He was actively involved in several DC literary organizations, including Washington Writers Publishing House, Word Works, the Folger Poetry Advisory Committee, and the Capitol Hill Poetry Group. He received the Poetry Committee's Columbia Merit Award in 1996.

== Publications ==
- 1977 – Now is Always the Miraculous Time
- 1979 – A Woman from Memphis
- 1983 – Aspects of a Southern Story
- 1989 – Fish Galore
- 1994 – The Cartographer
- 1998 – Stealthy Days
- 2000 – The Jazz Poems of Robert Sargent
- 2001 – Altered in the Telling
- 2002 – Wonderous News
- 2003 – 99 After 80
- 2004 – Lula and I
