= Savage Conversations =

2019 book by LeAnne Howe

- Author: LeAnne Howe
- Cover artist: Carlos Esparza
- Language: English
- Publisher: Coffee House Press
- Publication date: 2019
- Publication place: US
- Media type: Print (paperback original), screen reader, audiobook, ebook
- ISBN: 978-1-56689-531-6

Savage Conversations is a book by author and poet LeAnne Howe of the Choctaw Nation of Oklahoma. Published in 2019, the story is based on historical events that occurred in the United States between 1862 and 1876: the execution of thirty-eight Dakota men, the assassination of Abraham Lincoln, and the court-ordered institutionalization of Mary Todd Lincoln. In this book, Howe connects two events: Mary Todd Lincoln’s mental condition and the mass execution of the Dakota men.

Among critics, there is a lack of consensus on how to refer to the book's form.

== Characters ==
- Mary Todd Lincoln – Widow of Abraham Lincoln. She is institutionalized because of erratic behavior.
- Savage Indian – The ghost of a Dakota man that visits Mary Todd Lincoln each night.
- The Rope – The hangman’s noose used in the largest mass execution in United States history.

== Plot ==
The book is split into three scenes: “They Speak of Dreams,” “A House Divided,” and “An Uneasy Union,” with different titles within each scene. Each scene, written in lines of verse, recounts interactions between the characters Mary Todd Lincoln and Savage Indian, who she claims visits and tortures her each night. The Rope eavesdrops on their conversations and occasionally comments. Mary Todd Lincoln and Savage Indian discuss a variety of topics, from Savage Indian’s death, as well as the others killed in the mass execution, which Savage Indian blames Mrs. Lincoln for, to Mrs. Lincoln suspecting infidelity from her husband. Each night that he visits Mary Todd Lincoln, Savage Indian also commits physical violence: to her request, he slits her eyelids, sews them open, and scalps her. However, the following morning her wounds always disappear. The book ends with Mary Todd Lincoln’s eyes once again sewn open by Savage Indian.

== Setting ==
The book takes place from June 1875 to September 1875 in Bellevue Place Sanitarium, and September 1875 to June 1876 in the home of Mrs. Lincoln's sister, Elizabeth Todd Edwards. All three characters are present in both locations.

== Themes and analysis ==
=== Mental illness ===
According to Annette Lapointe, Howe uses Mary Todd Lincoln’s stay at an asylum for Munchausen by proxy as the historical basis of her story. Lapointe recognizes Savage Indian as a haunting figure from the Dakota 38 execution. Every night, Mary Todd Lincoln replays scenes of violence in her mind. Sarah Fawn Montgomery writes that Mrs. Lincoln’s “madness is reimaged as remorse.”

A writer for The Kenyon Review explains how Howe dives into Mrs. Lincoln's delusions to demonstrate “the very real racism” that shapes her hallucinations. Camille-Yvette Welsch describes the character as “obsessed” with her late husband and his suspected infidelity.

=== Agency of the First Lady ===
The unnamed reviewer for The Kenyon Review posits that Howe complicates the image of white female fragility with her characterization of Mary Todd Lincoln. Instead of allowing Lincoln to be passive, they say, Howe investigates her power as the First Lady and how that agency instigated “violence and cruelty that led to the mass execution," as well as the continuing war crimes against the Dakota. Annette Lapointe and Sarah Fawn Montgomery say that "Mary Todd's privilege is on display" as Howe focuses on Mrs. Lincoln's public and private crimes.

=== Mary Todd Lincoln's relationship with Savage Indian ===
Lapointe notes the complexity in Mrs. Lincoln’s relationship with Savage Indian. Mrs. Lincoln constantly despises Savage Indian and his existence, yet she wants to feel the pain of his knife every night. Lapointe calls attention to how Mrs. Lincoln “begs for it.” Savage Indian is described as a “hybrid figure.” He combines Mrs. Lincoln's fear of the “Indian Savages” and their perceived threat as presented in the Declaration of Independence.

== Style ==
Savage Conversations has been categorized as a novel, a play, a "poetically infused" play, a play-in-verse, “a striking hybrid", a play/poem/novel/historical nightmare, and “a sui generis collection of poetry and drama.”

The book begins with an introduction from Susan Power, then follows with a description of the story and a list of the characters. There are three scenes acted by the characters, and the book ends with the note pages from LeAnne Howe. A writer for The Kenyon Review notes that Howe plays with form to express the history and myths surrounding Lincoln and the execution.

== Dedication ==
Howe includes a dedication of the book to the warriors of the Dakota people.

== Background ==
Howe began writing the book during a visit to the Abraham Lincoln Library in Springfield, Illinois in 2008. The state and nation were preparing to celebrate Lincoln's two hundredth birthday in 2009, and Howe wanted to examine Lincoln's life and legacy through an Indigenous person’s perspective.

Howe researched "biographies, letters, and diaries," as well as other historical documents became interested in Mary Todd Lincoln. Howe’s research led her to memorabilia and files of Mrs. Lincoln’s short stay at Bellevue Place Sanitarium in Batavia, Illinois in 1875. Mary Todd Lincoln's history of erratic behavior included her complaints about an “Indian spirit” visiting her nightly who tortured her. These incidents led Mrs. Lincoln's son, Robert, to have her committed for treatment of a mental condition.

Howe wondered who the “Indian” was that Mrs. Lincoln referred to and speculated that he was a member of the Dakota 38, the largest mass execution in American history, which was ordered by President Lincoln. Howe has stated that the male “Indian spirit” voice was the first that she heard and that her adopted father's mental health, as well as her anger and curiosity about Mrs. Lincoln, were the basis for the book. The Rope became a character after an incident Howe had in Las Vegas while writing a draft of the book.

== Reception ==
Positive reviews and analysis followed the release of Savage Conversations. Annette Lapointe, for the New York Journal of Books, calls Savage Conversations a "crucial book" that "resists prose structure." In the Georgia Review, Shanae Aurora Martínez describes Savage Conversations as "a significant contribution to decolonial truth-telling.” Nathan McNamara, for the LA Review of Books, claims the book “operates with a savage intimacy that goes beneath the skin" and calls Howe “a genre chemist.” A writer for The Kenyon Review praises Howe for “her insightful and deft use of dramatic monologues.” In The Carolina Quarterly, Karah Mitchell says that “there is a quietness that thrums through this slender book."

== Literary significance ==
Several reviewers have commented on the way that Savage Conversations challenges generally accepted versions of history. Sarah Fawn Montgomery identified Savage Conversations as providing “a more accurate history” of the Lincoln Administration “than most textbooks do.” With Savage Conversations, Lapointe says that Howe forces readers to contend with history that is “difficult, necessary territory.” Shanae Aurora Martínez claims the book asks readers to “rethink history.”

== Adaptations ==
The Ensemble Studio Theatre, New York City, held a reading of Savage Conversations in 2019, directed by Paul Austin.

In early 2020, the University of Washington (UW) also staged a reading of Savage Conversations, featuring a small cast and minimal set. The reading was directed by Andrew Coopman, a master’s student at UW.
