= Malcolm Boyd =

American priest (1923–2015)

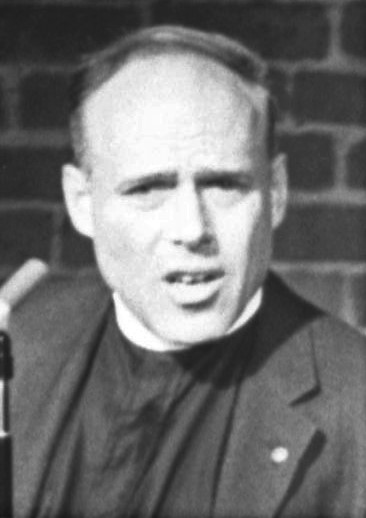
- Boyd in 1966
- Born: June 8, 1923; Buffalo, New York, U.S.
- Died: February 27, 2015 (aged 91); Los Angeles, California, U.S.
- Resting place: Lazarus Chapel, St. Paul’s Commons, 840 Echo Park Ave., Los Angeles
- Occupation: Priest
- Spouse: Mark Thompson

Malcolm Boyd (June 8, 1923 – February 27, 2015) was an American Episcopal priest and author. He was active in the Civil Rights Movement as one of the Freedom Riders in 1961 and as a minister. Boyd was also active in the anti-Vietnam War movement. In 1977, Boyd "came out", revealing that he was homosexual and becoming a spokesman for gay rights.

In 1965, Boyd published a book of prayers, Are You Running with Me, Jesus?, which became a bestseller. In 2005, it was published in a 40th-anniversary edition. In 2013, he served as a poet/writer in residence at St. Paul Cathedral in Los Angeles.

== Early life ==
Boyd was born in 1923 in Buffalo, New York, the son of Beatrice Lowrie, a fashion model, and Melville Boyd, a financier and investment banker whose own father (also named Malcolm) was an Episcopal priest. Boyd was raised as an Episcopalian (his maternal grandfather was Jewish).

In the early 1930s, Boyd's parents divorced; his mother retained custody of him. Boyd moved with his mother to Colorado Springs, Colorado, and then to Denver. During his time in college, despite early spiritual interests, he decided he was an atheist. In the 1940s, Boyd moved to Hollywood and rented a room in a $15.00 a week boarding house on Franklin Avenue. He owned few possessions and only one shirt, but was eventually given a position at a large agency and became a Hollywood junior producer. He began moving up in the Hollywood world, eventually founding PRB, a production company, with Mary Pickford, becoming her business partner. At the same time, amidst all the abundance and glamour of Hollywood, he found himself looking for meaning in different places, including churches.

== Priesthood ==
In 1951, Boyd began studying to become a priest at the Church Divinity School of the Pacific in Berkeley, California. He graduated in 1954 and was ordained a deacon. In 1955, he continued his studies abroad in England and Switzerland and returned to Los Angeles for ordination as a priest. During 1956 and 1957, Boyd studied further at Union Theological Seminary in the City of New York and wrote his first book, Crisis in Communication. In 1959, Boyd became Episcopal Chaplain at Colorado State University. In the 1960s, Boyd became known as "the Espresso Priest" for his religiously themed poetry-reading sessions at the Hungry i nightclub in San Francisco, at the time of the San Francisco Renaissance poetry movement. Boyd recalled in an interview with The Lavender effect that the San Francisco Chronicle once called him "Marlon Brando in a collar," due to his Hollywood connections and attractive appearance.

== Activism ==
Boyd went on to become a minister in the American Civil Rights Movement, promoting integration and voting rights. He participated as one of the Freedom Riders in 1961. Later that year he became the Episcopal Chaplain at Wayne State University in Detroit. He held a weekly meeting about civil rights, influencing Viola Liuzzo. Three years later she went to Selma, Alabama, to participate in the voting rights marches organized by SCLC and SNCC. She was murdered by the Klan while transporting marchers from Montgomery back to Selma following the successful march ending on March 25.

In 1963, Boyd attended an interfaith conference for racial integration in Chicago. Malcolm X referred to Boyd at the conference in his 1963 speech, "The Old Negro and the New Negro." Malcolm X said, "Rev. Boyd believes that the conference might have accomplished much good if the speakers had included a white supremacist and a Negro race leader, preferably a top man in the American Black Muslim movement." He quotes Boyd:

A debate between them (meaning this white racist and a Black Muslim) would undoubtedly be bitter, but it would accomplish one thing: it would get some of the real issues out into the open. In this conference we have not done that. The money spent to bring these people here has been wasted. We have done nothing to solve the race problem either in our churches or in our communities.

Boyd was also active in the anti-Vietnam War movement, leading demonstrations and teach-ins in protest of U.S. involvement in the Vietnam War. In 1970, Boyd was among 17 antiwar protesters, which also included Daniel Berrigan, who were arrested for attempting to celebrate a "mass for peace" at The Pentagon.

=== Later life and works ===
In 1977, Boyd came out of the closet, becoming one of the first prominent American clergymen to publicly acknowledge his homosexuality. In the 1980s, Boyd met Mark Thompson, an author, journalist and activist. Boyd and Thompson were domestic partners for almost 30 years and were married in 2013. Boyd considered his partnership and marriage to Thompson to be one of the most fulfilling aspects of his life. They resided in the Silver Lake neighborhood of Los Angeles, California.

Boyd served on the advisory board of White Crane Institute, and was a frequent contributor to the homosexual wisdom and culture magazine White Crane Journal.

The author of over 30 books, Boyd's collection of prayers Are You Running with Me, Jesus? (1965) became his bestselling success. The book earned Boyd a degree of public attention, and was re-issued in a 40th-anniversary edition. Until his death he wrote a column for The Huffington Post. He served as a poet/writer in residence for the Diocese of Los Angeles. Boyd died of complications from pneumonia at the age of 91 in Los Angeles on February 27, 2015.

== Books ==
- Crisis in Communication (Doubleday, 1957)
- Christ and Celebrity Gods (Seabury, 1958)
- Focus: Rethinking the Meaning of Our Evangelism (Morehouse-Barlow, 1960)
- If I Go Down to Hell (Morehouse-Barlow, 1962)
- The Hunger, the Thirst (Morehouse-Barlow, 1964)
- Are You Running with Me, Jesus? (Holt, Rinehart & Winston, 1965/40th anniversary edition, 2005), became a bestseller
- Free to Live, Free to Die (Holt, Rinehart & Winston, 1967)
- Malcolm Boyd's Book of Days (Random House, 1968)
- The Fantasy Worlds of Peter Stone and Other Fables (Harper & Row, 1969)
- As I Live and Breathe (Random House, 1969)
- My Fellow Americans (Holt, Rinehart & Winston, 1970)
- Human Like Me, Jesus (Simon and Schuster, 1971)
- The Lover (Word Books, 1972)
- The Runner (Word Books, 1974)
- The Alleluia Affair (Word Books, 1975)
- Christian: Its Meanings in an Age of Future Shock (Hawthorn, 1975)
- Am I Running with You, God? (Doubleday, 1977)
- Take Off the Masks (Doubleday, 1978; rev. ed. HarperCollins 1993, White Crane Books 2008)
- Look Back in Joy (Gay Sunshine Press, 1981; rev. ed. Alyson, 1990)
- Half Laughing, Half Crying (St. Martin's Press, 1986)
- Gay Priest: An Inner Journey (St. Martin's Press, 1986)
- Edges, Boundaries and Connections (Broken Moon Press, 1992)
- Rich with Years: Daily Meditations on Growing Older (HarperCollins, 1994)
- Go Gentle Into That Good Night (Genesis Press, 1998)
- Simple Grace: A Mentor's Guide to Growing Older (Westminster John Knox, 2001)
- Prayers for the Later Years (Augsburg, 2002)
- A Prophet in His Own Land: The Malcolm Boyd Reader (edited by Bo Young/Dan Vera) (White Crane Books, 2008)

=== Edited by Malcolm Boyd ===
- On the Battle Lines: A Manifesto for Our Times (Morehouse-Barlow, 1964)
- The Underground Church (Sheed & Ward, 1968)
- When in the Course of Human Events (with Paul Conrad, Sheed & Ward, 1973)
- Amazing Grace: Stories of Lesbian and Gay Faith (with Nancy L. Wilson, Crossing Press, 1991)
- Race & Prayer: Collected Voices, Many Dreams (w/Chester Talton, Morehouse, 2003)
- In Times Like These…How We Pray (with J. Jon Bruno, Seabury, 2005)
