= Aunt Lute Books =

American multicultural feminist press

- Founded: 1982
- Founder: Barb Wieser and Joan Pinkvoss
- Headquarters location: San Francisco, CA
- Distribution: Small Press Distribution
- Publication types: Books
- Fiction genres: Feminist literature
- Official website: auntlute.com

Aunt Lute Books is an American multicultural feminist press based in San Francisco, California. The publisher also seeks to work with and support first-time authors.

== Publishing history ==
In 1982, Aunt Lute Book Company was founded by Barb Wieser and Joan Pinkvoss in Iowa.

Aunt Lute merged with Spinsters Ink, another feminist publisher, in 1986, and the two organizations published jointly for several years in San Francisco under the name Spinsters/Aunt Lute. In 1990 the Aunt Lute Foundation was established as a non-profit publishing program.

In 1992, Spinsters Ink was purchased by lesbian feminist philanthropist Joan Drury and moved to Minneapolis.

Aunt Lute continues to operate independently as a nonprofit to the present day.

== Titles ==
Aunt Lute has published a number of high-profile feminist and lesbian authors, including Audre Lorde (The Cancer Journals), Gloria Anzaldúa (Borderlands/La Frontera: The New Mestiza), Melanie Kaye/Kantrowitz, LeAnne Howe (Shell Shaker, winner of the 2002 Before Columbus American Book Award, and Miko Kings: An Indian Baseball Story), Alice Walker, and Paula Gunn Allen.

Call Me Woman, the autobiography of South African activist Ellen Kuzwayo, Radmila Manojlovic Zarkovic's anthology, I Remember: Writings by Bosnian Women Refugees, and Cherry Muhanji's Lambda Award-winning novel Her have also been published by Aunt Lute.

Other Aunt Lute titles include the first U.S. collection of Filipina/Filipina American women writers and the first collection of Southeast Asian women writers, as well as a number of translated texts.

Other titles are listed below:

- A Simple Revolution by Judy Grahn
- Alice Walker Banned by Alice Walker
- Beautiful and Dark by Rosa Montero and Trans Adrienne Mitchell
- Borderlands/La Frontera (Fourth Edition) by Gloria Anzaldúa
- Call Me Woman by Ellen Kuzwayo
- The Cancer Journals by Audre Lorde
- flesh to bone by ire'ne lara silva
- Gulf Dreams; by Emma Perez
- Haggadah by Martha Shelley
- Hot Chicken Wings by Jyl Lynn Felman
- Her by Cherry Muhanji
- The Issue is Power by Melanie Kaye Kantrowitz
- My Jewish Face by Melanie Kaye Kantrowitz
- Junglee Girl by Ginu Kamani
- Lowest Blue Flame Before Nothing by Lara Stapleton
- Maidenhome by Ding Xiaoqi
- Me As Her Again by Nancy Agabian
- Miko Kings: An Indian Baseball Story by LeAnne Howe
- The Storyteller, with Nike Airs by Kleya Forte-Escamilla
- Shell Shaker by LeAnne Howe
- Send My Roots Rain by Ibis Gomez-Vega
- Singing Softly/Cantando Bajito by Carmen de Monteflores
- Teaching at the Crossroads by Laurie Grobman
- Transforming Feminist Practice: Non-Violence, Social Justice, and the Possibilities of a Spiritualized Feminism by Leela Fernandes
- The Two Mujeres by Sara Levi Calderon
- Teacher at Point Blank: Confronting Sexuality, Violence, and Secrets in a Suburban School by Jo Scott-Coe
- The Way We Make Sense by Dawn Karima Pettigrew
- White Snake and Other Stories by Geling Yan
- The Woman Who Owned the Shadows by Paula Gunn Allen

== Anthologies and collections ==
- Babaylan: An Anthology of Filipina and Filipina American Writers, eds. Nick Carbo and Eileen Tabios
- City of One: Young Writers Speak to the World by WritersCorps
- El Mundo Zurdo; El Mundo Zurdo, 2; El Mundo Zurdo, 3, eds. Norma E. Cantu, Christina L. Gutierrez, Norma Alarcón and Rita E. Urquijo-Ruiz
- Frontline Feminism, ed. Karen Kahn
- Good Girls Marry Doctors, ed. Piyali Bhattacharya
- Imaniman: Poets Writing in the Anzaldúan Borderlands, eds. ire'ne lara silva and Dan Vera with an introduction by United States Poet Laureate Juan Felipe Herrera
- Making Face, Making Soul/Haciendo Caras, ed. Gloria Anzaldúa
- New Voices 1 by DeeAnne Davis, Rabie Harris, and Gloria Yamato
- Our Feet Walk the Sky by Women of South Asian Descent Collective (WOSAD)
- Positive/Negative: Women of Color and HIV/AIDS, eds. Imani Harrington and Chyrell Bellamy
- Radical Acts: Theatre and Feminist Pedagogies of Change, eds. Anne Elizabeth Armstrong and Kathleen Juhl
- Shadow on a Tightrope, eds. Lisa Schoenfielder and Barb Wieser
- Solid Ground, by WritersCorps
- The Aunt Lute Anthology of U.S. Women Writers, Volume One: 17th through 19th Centuries, eds. Lisa Maria Hogeland and Mary Klages
- The Aunt Lute Anthology of U.S. Women Writers, Volume Two, eds. Lisa Maria Hogeland and Shay Brown
- The Judy Grahn Reader by Judy Grahn
- The Unforgetting Heart: An Anthology of Short Stories by African American Women (1859-1993), ed. Asha Kanwar
- Through the Eye of the Deer: An Anthology of Native American Women Writers, eds. Carolyn Dunn and Carol Comfort
- Reclaiming Medusa: Short Stories by Contemporary Puerto Rican Women, ed. Diana Velez

== Awards ==
Aunt Lute Books won the 2004-2005 and the 2005-2006 Best of the Small Presses Award, granted by Standards, an international cultural studies magazine.

== See also ==
- Feminist literature
- Feminist bookstores
- Lesbian literature
