= Reetika Vazirani =

American poet

Reetika Gina Vazirani
- Born: 9 August 1962; Patiala, India
- Died: 16 July 2003 (aged 40); Chevy Chase, Maryland, United States
- Occupation: Author
- Writing career
- Genre: Poetry
- Notable works: White Elephants, World Hotel, Radha Says

Reetika Gina Vazirani (9 August 1962 – 16 July 2003) was an Indian-American immigrant poet and educator.

== Life ==
Vazirani was born in Patiala, India in 1962. She was six-years-old when her family left Punjab in 1968 as part of a wave of Indians coming to the United States after its immigration laws loosened in 1965. The family settled, after a few interim stops, in White Oak, Illinois. Her father, Sunder Vazirani, was an oral surgeon who received his graduate education at the University of Illinois, later to become the assistant dean at Howard University's dental school. Reetika graduated from Springbrook High School in Silver Spring, Maryland and continued her education at Wellesley College, graduating in 1984. It is there she received a Thomas J. Watson Fellowship to travel to India, Thailand, Japan, and China. She later earned an M.F.A. from the University of Virginia as a Hoyns Fellow.

Vazirani lived in Trenton, New Jersey, with her son Jehan, near the poet Yusef Komunyakaa, who was her partner and Jehan's father. There she taught creative writing as a visiting faculty member at The College of New Jersey. At the time of her death, Vazirani was Writer-in-Residence at the College of William & Mary in Williamsburg, Virginia, with the intent of joining the English department at Emory University. On 16 July 2003, Vazirani was housesitting in the Chevy Chase, Maryland, home of novelist Howard Norman and his wife, the poet, Jane Shore. There, Vazirani killed her two-year-old son, Jehan, by stabbing him multiple times, then fatally stabbed herself.

== Works ==
Vazirani was the author of two poetry collections, White Elephants, winner of the 1995 Barnard New Women Poets Prize, and World Hotel (Copper Canyon Press, 2002), winner of the 2003 Anisfield-Wolf book award. She was a contributing and advisory editor for Shenandoah, a book review editor for Callaloo, and a senior poetry editor for Catamaran, a journal of South Asian literature. She translated poetry from Urdu and had some of her poems translated into Italian.

Her poem "Mouth-Organs and Drums" was published in the anthology Poets Against the War (Nation Books, 2003).

Vazirani's final collection of poetry, Radha Says, edited by Leslie McGrath and Ravi Shankar, was published in 2009 by Drunken Boat Media.

== Awards ==
- 2003, Anisfield-Wolf Book Award
- 1995, Barnard Women Poets Prize

She was a recipient of a Discovery/The Nation Award, a Pushcart Prize, the Poets & Writers Exchange Program Award, fellowships from the Bread Loaf and Sewanee writers conferences, the Glenna Luschei/Prairie Schooner Award for her essay, "The Art of Breathing," included in the anthology How We Live our Yoga (Beacon 2001). She also had a poem in The Best American Poetry 2000.
