= Ire'ne lara silva =

American poet

Ire'ne Lara Silva
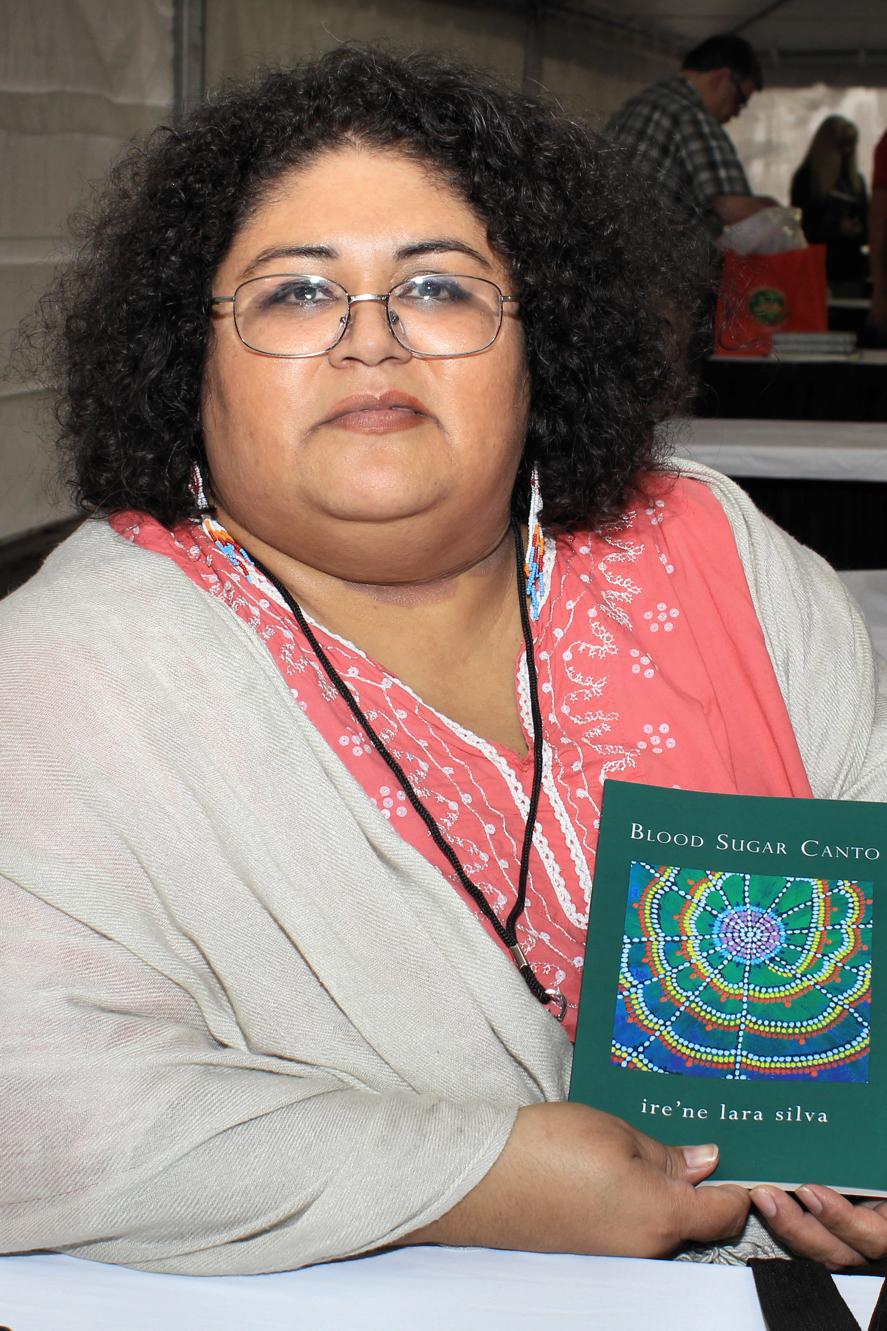
- Silva at the 2016 Texas Book Festival.
- Writing career
- Genre: Poetry/Fiction
- Notable awards: NALAC Grant; Alfredo Cisneros del Moral Award; AROHO Fiction Finalist; Gloria Anzaldúa Milagro Award

Ire'ne Lara Silva is a Chicana feminist poet and writer from Austin, Texas. Her parents were migrant farmworkers. She has published numerous works of poetry and her short story collection won the 2013 Premio Aztlán Literary Prize. A central theme of her work is Indigenous survival and perseverance despite colonization: "let's empower ourselves with that knowledge."

== Early years ==
Silva grew up in the Rio Grande Valley of South Texas. Her parents were migrant farmworkers and she spent many years with her family moving "from South Texas to Mathis to Oklahoma to New Mexico to the Panhandle and back to South Texas."

== Writing career ==
Silva is the author of three chapbooks of poetry, two full-length books of poetry, and one short story collection. Her work has appeared in various journals, including Acentos Review, Pilgrimage, and Yellow Medicine Review and various anthologies including Improbable Worlds: An Anthology of Texas and Louisiana Poets and The Weight of Addition: An Anthology of Texas Poetry.

Silva's collection, blood sugar canto, was published by Saddle Road Press in January 2016. Silva served as co-editor with Dan Vera for IMANIMAN: Poets Reflect on Transformative & Transgressive Borders Through Gloria Anzaldúa's Work, published by Aunt Lute Books (2016).

== Awards and prizes ==
Her first full-length collection of poetry furia received an honorable mention for the 2011 International Latino Book Award. Her short story collection flesh to bone won the 2013 Premio Aztlán Literary Prize, was a fiction finalist for A Room of Her Own Foundation's 2013 Gift of Freedom Award, and was a finalist for Foreword Review's Book of the Year Award in Multicultural Fiction.

Silva is the recipient of the 2014 Alfredo Cisneros del Moral Award and the 2008 recipient of the Gloria Anzaldúa Milagro Award. Silva was a founding fellow of the CantoMundo Writers Conference.

From 2004 to 2008, Silva was the Executive Coordinator of the prestigious Macondo Writers Workshop, the workshop founded by Sandra Cisneros. She was a co-director of the Flor De Nopal Literary Festival.

== Works ==
=== Poetry ===
- ani'mal, La Loba Press, (2001), reprinted Axoquentlatoa Press, (2010)
- INDíGENA, La Loba Press, (2001), reprinted Axoquentlatoa Press, (2010)
- furia, London: Mouthfeel Press, (2010)
- Enduring Azucares, Little Rock: Sibling Rivalry Press, (2015)
- blood sugar canto, Hilo: Saddle Road Press (2016)
- Cuicacalli / House of Song, Saddle Road Press, 2019

=== Short stories ===
- flesh to bone, San Francisco: Aunt Lute Books, (2013)

=== As editor ===
- Imaniman: Poets Writing in the Anzaldúan Borderlands. Aunt Lute Books. 2016. ISBN 9781879960930., with Dan Vera and an introduction by United States Poet Laureate Juan Felipe Herrera
