= Shell Shaker =

2001 novel by LeAnne Howe

- Author: LeAnne Howe
- Cover artist: Jaune Quick-to-See Smith
- Language: English
- Genre: Novel
- Publisher: Aunt Lute Books
- Publication date: September 2001
- Publication place: United States
- Media type: Print (Paperback)
- Pages: 223 pp
- ISBN: 978-1-879960-61-9

Shell Shaker (2001) is a novel by American LeAnne Howe (Choctaw Nation of Oklahoma). The novel's plot revolves around two tales of murder involving historical Choctaw political leaders. Set over a 200-year period, it focuses on several generations of the fictional Billy family, who try to keep the peace. It won the 2002 Before Columbus American Book Award.

According to Howe, Shell Shaker is "a book about power, its misuse, and how a community responds. It's not for Indians only."

== Title ==
A shell shaker is a woman who participates in a Choctaw ceremony for which empty turtle shells are tied around a dancer's feet. The dance is a prayer to the spirits to answer a request. The Billy family is descended from the first shell shaker, called Grandmother of Birds.

== Plot ==
Shell Shaker links two distant generations of the Billy family. The novel begins in 1738 in Choctaw Mississippi, initially focusing on Red Shoes (a historical Choctaw chief). He has two wives, one who is Choctaw and one who is Chickasaw, from a neighboring tribe. When his Chickasaw wife is found murdered, his Choctaw wife Anoleta is blamed. Anoleta's mother, Shakbatina, sacrifices her life to save her daughter and avert a war between the tribes. But during the next decade, the Choctaw try to decide what action to take against Red Shoes, while Anoleta and her family try to survive. Red Shoes plays both sides in what becomes a civil war that devastates both the Choctaw town of Yanàbi and Anoleta's family.

The novel picks up in 1991, long after Removal, when Shakbatina's descendants live in Durant, Oklahoma. As a wildfire destroys the land around them, the Choctaw chief Redford McAlester is murdered. Assistant chief Auda Billy (also his lover) is blamed. Auda's mother Susan Billy confesses to the murder, and Isaac Billy (Auda's maternal uncle) gathers their scattered family to help with the investigation. Plot threads include embezzlement, rape, money laundering, and donations to the Irish Republican Army and the Mafia. An old woman claims to be actress Sarah Bernhardt.

== Themes ==
The novel explores a number of themes, particularly regarding the circular nature of time and issues of Native American identity. The novel presents time as circular, and incapable of being divided into a separate past and the present. It explores connections over time, including the concept that when a shilombish (soul) is troubled in life, it casts a shadow over a family that endures until the problem is solved.

Howe also explores themes related specifically to Choctaw traditions and legends. The novel uses the traditional Choctaw burial practices to show the connection between the body and the land. In discussing this novel, Howe has explained that, "Native stories ... seem to pull all the elements together of the storyteller's tribe, meaning the people, the land, and multiple characters and all their manifestations and revelations, and connect these in past, present and future milieus."

The novel also explores issues of identity. Howe has been praised for presenting the Billy sisters as "real" Indian women, who also exercise autonomy in their careers, rather than as marginalized figures or romanticized Indian princesses.

Other themes explored in the work are the power of words, which become real if spoken. It also studies the Americanization of the Choctaw tribe.

== Motifs and images ==
The novel has a number of motifs and images; for instance, both murders occur during the autumnal equinox. Burial rituals connect the novel's two time periods.

Smoke is a screen between eras, becoming thicker as the stories begin to meet. Birds appear throughout the novel, which tells the story of the Grandmother of Birds (who becomes a bird to punish Spanish invaders when her husband is killed).

== Reception ==
Shell Shaker has been praised for emphasizing the importance of history in the lives of a Native American group as they deal with decolonization. Scholar and critic P. Jane Hafen (Taos Pueblo) said in 2002, "Howe seamlessly integrates a history of desperate and gruesome fights for survival with modern Faustian pacts with materialism and wealth. At the heart of the story are generations of Choctaw peoples who preserve with ritual gestures of 'life everlasting'".

This is one of the few novels to focus on Choctaw history from the point of view of a native author. According to Ken McCullough, "Although there has been significant scholarship on this historical period in the southeast, between the arrival of De Soto and Removal, no one has written a work of the imagination (of this magnitude) set in this period". The novel presents its characters differently from preconceived American ideas: "The variations in voice among the protagonists show that Howe knows how to imagine different characters, and those figures confirm and challenge stereotypes about Native Americans in a way that can only be productive for all readers."

=== Style and technique ===
The novel begins from the point of view of Shakbatina, who describes her death. Except for two later chapters, the remainder is third-person narration. This viewpoint change is part of traditional Choctaw storytelling, giving voices to its characters rather than describing them.

Repetition is used throughout Shell Shaker in situations and quotations to connect the generations. One example is "ten thousand feet of intestines hanging from trees in Yanabi Town", which is finally explained at the end of the novel. Articles such as a porcupine sash and turtle shells are passed down, along with their imagery, from generation to generation. The repetition of images, connecting the generations, enforces the themes of circular time and the connection of people.

Memories and flashbacks are used, becoming longer and more frequent as the Billy family attempts to piece together its past. According to writer Lucy Maddox, memory in the novel "alternates scenes from present and the past, conflating ancestral lives and contemporary ones to produce stories about the ways in which identity is both constructed and understood in a tribal context that makes memory more relevant than chronology".

The translated Choctaw language is featured, beginning with Shell Shaker's opening lines. The novel's main themes are expressed in the Choctaw language, including the bloodsucker (osano) and the search for the Greatest Giver (Imataha Chitto).

Grandmother Porcupine, a trickster, provides humor as she imparts knowledge to those she chooses (Isaac, Hoppy and Nick). Claiming to be an animal spirit over 400 years old and a protector of the family, she represents "an openness to life's multiplicity and paradoxes".

=== Criticism ===
Shell Shaker has been praised for its dynamic presentation of characters, without resorting to stereotypes of either whites or Native Americans. In the sections set in the 18th century, whites are often referred to as the enemy; they are identified as either "inklish okla," English people, or "filanchi okla," French people, reflecting the historical record. In the sections set in the present day, some white characters are presented as sympathetic and rounded people; these include Borden, who is married to a Native American woman. Italian mobsters and Irish gangsters are described in stereotypical ways, but Howe acknowledges that "corruption [is not] necessarily a condition of Americans and American society overall, and if it is, then American Indians are participants, not exempt". The novel contains elements of sex and violence, with scenes of rape, war, and cannibalism.
