= Yowani Choctaw =

Choctaw group in Texas

The Yowani Choctaw are a band of Choctaw people who migrated from Mississippi to live in Louisiana, Texas, and Oklahoma. In Oklahoma the Yowani are enrolled in the Caddo, Choctaw, and Chickasaw Nations.

== Background ==
Yowani was the name of a preremoval Choctaw village. When this area became part of the United States under the Louisiana Purchase in 1803, many of the resident Indian tribes wanted to emigrate to less hostile environs. Spain agreed to allow the Yowani and the Alabama-Coushatta to move to Spanish Texas. In 1824, after Mexico gained independence, a second group of Yowani received permission to establish villages in Texas. The Yowani gradually abandoned their original Mississippi homelands. By 1850 most Yowani had moved west and lived within the Chickasaw Nation in Indian Territory near present-day Ardmore and Marlow, Oklahoma, and in Rusk and Smith counties in east Texas.

During the Texas Revolution in 1836, the Yowani were a party to a peace treaty with the new provisional government of Texas. Following Texas's independence and the creation of the Republic of Texas, relations between Indian tribes and English-speaking settlers deteriorated. Under President Mirabeau B. Lamar, the Texas Army drove most of the Cherokee out of Texas. A vigilante group attacked the Choctaw instead. The survivors split up, with most leaving Texas.

Between 1840 and 1843, elements of the Mexican militia, led by Vicente Cordova, fought a guerrilla war against the Anglo settlers, using warriors from remnant groups of displaced tribes, primarily Cherokee but including some Yowani Choctaw. General Adrian Woll led the Mexican occupation of San Antonio in September 1842. Both Indian and Mexican regulars were involved in the defeat of the Dawson Expedition and the Battle of Salado Creek. The Mexican troops soon departed from Texas.

Most of the men served in the Confederate Army during the American Civil War. In the early 20th century, several members of the Yowani Choctaw, led by William Clyde Thompson of Texas, relocated to the Chickasaw Nation in Indian Territory. They wanted to be included in registration for the Dawes Commission Final Rolls as citizens by blood of the Choctaw Nation and recognized by the federal government. This would enable them to be eligible for allotments of land, as the United States had decided to allocate the tribal communal land to individual households to encourage their adoption of subsistence farming. A long political struggle ensued between 1898 and 1909, as the Choctaw leaders of Indian Territory did not want the long-absent Yowani to receive any of their land.

In 1905 the Bureau of Indian Affairs struck all the registered Texas Yowani from the Final Rolls of the Choctaw Nation. Thompson pursued a legal challenge, appealing the government's action ultimately to the United States Supreme Court. It ruled in favor of the Yowani, and these families were included on a 1909 Choctaw reinstatement list, giving them citizenship in the Choctaw Nation and the right to any associated benefits.

== Village ==
The original Yowani village appeared on a 1777 French map near the village of Chicasawhay and the Pascagoula River, west of what was described at the "Choctaw Capitale."

The Yowani Choctaw were associated by name with the village where they were living when French traders from the La Louisiane colony encountered them. The word in Choctaw is believed to have meant "caterpillar," likely common at that site.

Over time, the Yowani band expanded its territory westward to the eastern dividing ridge of Bogue Homa, then northward as far as present-day Pachuta Creek. From this point, their territory ran south to the confluence of the Chickasawhay and Buckatunna rivers.

By 1764, a group of Yowani had moved west into Louisiana, where they established contact with the Koasati and Caddo indigenous peoples. Over time, the Yowani adopted Caddo customs and the groups became very interlinked by marriage.

In the late 19th century, the American anthropologist James Mooney listed the Yowani as one of the 13 divisions of the Caddo Confederacy. They were sketched among the Caddo by a member of Manuel de Mier y Terán's party in 1828.

== Moving westward ==
At the time that the Yowani ventured into Louisiana, the territory had been under Spanish control since 1763, when France ceded it after defeat by Great Britain in the Seven Years' War, fought both in Europe and North America. In 1800, Spain traded Louisiana back to France. After Napoleon briefly attempted to re-establish control over Saint-Domingue, with visions of empire in North America, he sold the mainland territory in 1803 to the United States as what they called the Louisiana Purchase. It doubled the area of the new nation. Many of the ethnic French residents of Louisiana, and many of the Indian tribes, did not want to be ruled by the United States.

Spain agreed to allow several Indian tribes, including the Yowani Choctaw and the Alabama-Coushatta, to relocate to the neighboring Spanish colonial province of Texas. Other Indian tribes later emigrated to Texas to avoid the Americans; these included some Cherokee, Muscogee-Creek, Seminole, Shawnee, Delaware, Quapaw, Kickapoo and Miami. Following the Mexican War of Independence from Spain, Mexico assumed control of Texas. In 1824, another group of Yowani, led by Atahobia, petitioned the Mexican government to settle within the province of Texas. They were given permission to establish several villages east of the Trinity River and west of the border with Louisiana.

During the period between 1810 and 1836, many of the relocated tribes, including the Yowani Choctaw, were often subject to attacks from the Comanche who roamed the western part of Texas. The Lipan Apache, located in the southern part of the province, also attacked them. The Yowani often joined forces with the English-speaking settlers for self-defense against these nomadic tribes.

By 1832, all but two families had left the traditional Yowani lands in Mississippi to migrate west. Although some settled briefly in what is now Rapides Parish, Louisiana, by 1850 many of the Yowani had settled with other Choctaw in the Chickasaw Nation in Indian Territory. This area had been established during Indian Removal of the 1830s, when the US forced tribes from the East to west of the Mississippi River, exchanging lands and arranging payments or annuities in some instances.

The Yowani remaining in east Texas joined with other remnant peoples to form a part of what is now recognized as the historical Texas Cherokees and Associated Bands. In Louisiana, they were closely related to the remaining Coushatta, the Louisiana Band of Choctaw and the Jena Band of Choctaw.

== Texas Indian Wars (1835–1843) ==
In 1835, English-speaking settlers and some anti-Santa Anna Tejanos in Texas launched the Texas Revolution to gain independence from Mexico. The provisional Texas government sent Sam Houston, a man much respected by the Cherokee, to negotiate a treaty with the Indians living in East Texas. They concluded a treaty at Bowles Village on February 23, 1836, between the Cherokee and Twelve Associated Tribes (including the Yowani Choctaw) and the provisional Texas government.

In March 1836, the Republic of Texas was established, gaining full independence from Mexico the following month. Elected the first president of the Republic, Houston continued to negotiate peace with the various Indian tribes. After 1837, the Yowani combined settlements to form a single village on Attoyac Bayou in extreme southeastern Rusk County. An 1837 census of Indians in the Republic of Texas noted that 70 Yowani Choctaw lived in this village, along with several Chickasaw. The census also noted that these people were peaceable.

The Texas Legislature refused to ratify many of Houston's treaties. The second president of the Republic, Mirabeau Lamar, did not share Houston's respect for the native tribes, and refused to honor Houston's treaties. New settlers to the region often settled or encroached on lands that had been granted to Indian tribes, and some tribes retaliated against them. In the summer of 1839, Lamar ordered the Texian Army to attack Cherokee villages. The Americans eventually drove the Cherokee out of Texas; some went to Indian Territory, where the Cherokee Nation had relocated, and others to northern Mexico. A third group joined the Caddo at the Brazos Reservation further west, and eventually accompanied the Caddo to a reservation in Indian Territory. A fourth group, led by Woody Jones, chose to remain in East Texas, moving further into the piney woods to avoid detection by Texas military forces.

Throughout Lamar's term as president, the Republic of Texas conducted a policy of attrition against various groups of Natives, including those under Chicken Trotter. He launched a guerrilla campaign against Texans. When Lamar's term expired, Sam Houston was elected to a second term as president. Houston began treaty negotiations with the tribes, culminating in the Treaty of Birds Fort, which was concluded on September 29, 1843. This treaty ended most hostilities in Texas with the tribes who had migrated to Texas decades before. Although the Yowani were not a direct party to it, they had several ties to those in attendance. Other Yowani in Texas continued to live under the authority of Woody Jones in Houston County near the border with Trinity County.

== Relocation ==
President James K. Polk in 1844 granted permission to both members of the Ridge Party and the Old Settlers of the Cherokee, who had political differences with the Cherokee Nation, to relocate from Indian Territory to East Texas. More Yowani Choctaw, led by Atahobia's grandson Archibald Thompson and Jeremiah Jones, the grandson of Choctaw Chief Samuel "Nashoba" Jones, relocated to the East Texas before 1850. These were followed by McIntosh Creek Indians, led by brothers William and Thomas Berryhill, also before 1850.

== Recent years ==
Throughout the twentieth century, there have been a number strong leaders among the Texas Choctaw community. These include William Clyde Thompson and Martin Luther Thompson, who helped gain registration for their peoples as citizens "by Blood" in the Choctaw Nation.

== See also ==
- Stand Watie
