= LeAnne Howe =

American poet

- Born: April 29, 1951 (age 75); Edmond, Oklahoma, U.S.
- Occupations: Author; Playwright; Scholar; Poet

LeAnne Howe (born April 29, 1951, Choctaw Nation of Oklahoma) is an American author and Eidson Distinguished Professor in the Department of English at the University of Georgia, Athens. She previously taught American Indian Studies and English at the University of Minnesota and at the University of Illinois at Urbana-Champaign.

== Early life and education ==
LeAnne Howe was born into a Choctaw family in Edmond, Oklahoma, and attended local schools as a child. She later attended Oklahoma State University, where she majored in English. She is a Choctaw Nation citizen.

Years later, Howe returned to studies, gaining a Master of Fine Arts degree in 2000 in Creative Writing from Vermont College of Norwich University. Over the next few years, she began to shift toward the academic world. She taught, lectured and developed courses in Native American Studies at the University of Iowa and at Carleton College in Northfield, Minnesota.

== Career ==
Howe is an author, playwright, scholar, and poet. She has explored Native American experiences through writing screenplays. She has also written fiction, creative non-fiction, plays, and poetry. She has conducted public readings of her work, and has lectured in Japan, Jordan, Israel, Romania, and Spain.

Howe's work has been published in various journals and anthologies.

== Honors and awards ==
She received the Before Columbus Foundation's American Book Award in 2002 for her novel Shell Shaker. In 2006, Howe's collection of poetry Evidence of Red (Salt Publishing, UK 2005) won the Oklahoma Book Award. In 2012, Howe was the recipient of a United States Artists Fellow award. In 2015, Howe was awarded the first MLA Prize for Studies in Native American Literatures, Cultures, and Languages for her second novel, titled Choctalking On Other Realities (Aunt Lute Books, 2013).

== Books ==
- Shell Shaker, Aunt Lute Books, San Francisco, 2001
- Evidence of Red: Poems and Prose, Salt Publishing, UK, 2005
- Miko Kings: An Indian Baseball Story, Aunt Lute Books, 2007
- Seeing Red, Pixeled Skins, American Indians and Film, Michigan State University Press, East Lansing, MI, 2013
- Choctalking on Other Realities, Aunt Lute Books, San Francisco, 2013
- "Singing, Still, Libretto for the 1847 Choctaw Gift to the Irish for Famine Relief," The Irish Times
- Savage Conversations, Coffee House Press, 2019

== Plays ==
- The Mascot Opera (Alexander Street Press, 2008)
- Big PowWow
- Indian Radio Days (Theatre C. G.,1998)

== Films ==
- Co-editor with Harvey Markowitz, and Denise K. Cummings, Seeing Red, Pixeled Skins: American Indians and Film, 2013
- Co-producer with James Fortier for Playing Pastimes: American Indian Fast-Pitch Softball, and Survival, 2007
- Screenwriter and on-camera narrator for Indian Country Diaries: Spiral of Fire, 2006

== See also ==
- List of writers from peoples indigenous to the Americas
- Native American Studies
- Native American dramatists and playwrights
