= William Clyde Thompson =

William Clyde Thompson (c. 1839 – 1912) was a Texas Choctaw. He made an effort fight the Dawes Rolls for Choctaw enrollment.

== Background ==
His family were Yowani Choctaw, named for their village of Yowani east of the Chickasawhay River in what is now eastern Mississippi. The town of present-day Shubuta, Clarke County, Mississippi, developed nearby, first as a trading post. After 1837 their villages were combined to form a single village on Attoyac Bayou in extreme southeastern Rusk County.

After being orphaned, William and his older brother Arthur James Thompson (1837–1884) were to live with their paternal grandmother Margaret (McCoy) Thompson (c.1774–c.1868), then living in Chickasaw Nation near Fort Washita. She had been married by Choctaw custom to Henry Thompson, a white man, and lived with him while in Mississippi, having three sons with him before removal of the Choctaw to Indian Territory. By the time of the forced removal she was living near her brother James A. McCoy in the Chickasaw Nation-East in what is now Pontotoc County, Mississippi. James McCoy would later go on to serve as the Supreme Judge of the Chickasaw Nation. In the 1840s she lived near Fort Washita in the Chickasaw Nation at a community then known as Virginia Hill, presumably near her half-brother Dickson Frazier. The boys lived with her until their maternal grandfather William Mangum came to take them back to Mississippi, where they lived with him and his family until coming of age and serving in the American Civil War.

== Return to Indian Territory ==
Martin Thompson and Robert Thompson stayed for a short period, but returned to Texas. Oil was discovered on Martin's land in Texas, making him a wealthy man worth more than $200,000 at the time of his death.

While living in the Chickasaw Nation, William Thompson worked tirelessly to have his family members enrolled as citizens by blood in the Choctaw Nation, where he had been born. He wanted to be counted as a citizen to participate in the allotments of Choctaw communal lands that was to be conducted under the Dawes Act, to extinguish Indian claims in preparation for Oklahoma statehood. He also wanted to ensure that his family were recognized as Choctaw Indians as their birthright. The case went back and forth for years, as the Choctaw Advisory Board opposed inclusion of individuals in Texas or Jena Choctaws from Louisiana who were separated from the nation for an extended period of time. The names of Thompson and his family, and all the Texas Choctaws, were stricken from the Dawes Roll in March 1906.

In February 1909 Thompson and some seventy Texas Choctaw who were living in Oklahoma were restored to citizenship in the Choctaw Nation and included in a Department of Interior reinstatement list.

== Notes ==
=== Sources ===
- William C. Thompson, et al. vs. Choctaw Nation, MCR File 341, Bureau of Indian Affairs, Muskogee, Oklahoma
- United States Department of the Interior, Secretary of the Interior-Choctaw Citizenship Cases, #4 William C. Thompson et al., pgs 151–157
- D.C. Gideon, Indian Territory...1901, pg. 534
- William C. Thompson and the Choctaw-Chickasaw Paper Chase by Dr. Douglas Hale, Oklahoma State University
- Department of the Interior, Office of Indian Affairs correspondence between A.C. Tonner, Acting Commissioner for the Dawes Commission, and the Secretary of the Interior, April 29, 1904; ref. Land 25846-1904-Oklahoma Historical Society
- John S. Spring et al. vs. Choctaw Nation, Bureau of Indian Affairs, Muskogee, Oklahoma Press, Austin, Texas, Edited by Gifford White, Nacogdoches County
- Texas Indian Papers 1835-1845, Texas State Archives, Austin, Texas
- A History of the Caddo Indians by William B. Glover, The Louisiana Historical Quarterly, Vol. 18, No. 4. October, 1935
- Texas by Terán By Manuel de Mier y Teran, Jack Jackson, John Wheat, Scooter Cheatham, Lynn Marshall
- Oklahoma Historical Society, Records of the Department of the Interior, Laws, Decisions and Regulations Affecting the work of the Commissioner to the Five Civilized Tribes 1893-1906, pgs 130–138
- Letter of April 4, 1905, from Thomas Ryan, First Assistant Secretary Indian Affairs to Commissioner to the Five Civilized Tribes, Muskogee, Indian Territory, re: Willian C. Thompson et al. MCR 341, MCR 7124, MCR 581 and MCR 458.
- The Dawes Commission and the Allotment of the Five Civilized Tribes, 1893-1914 by Kent Carter, Ancestry Publishing 1999, ISBN 0-916489-85-X, 13:978-0916489854
