= Washington Writers' Publishing House =

U.S. non-profit publisher

- Industry: Non-profit publishing house
- Founded: 1975
- Headquarters: Potomac, Maryland
- Key people: Caroline Bock (Co-President); Jona Colson (Co-President)
- Website: washingtonwriters.org

Washington Writers' Publishing House is a cooperative, non-profit small press that publishes poetry, fiction (novels and short story collections), and creative nonfiction (memoirs and essay collections).

The press was founded by four poets, including Grace Cavalieri, in 1975. The Washington Writers' Publishing House is dedicated to publishing writers who live in Washington, DC, Maryland, and Virginia and has an annual contest for manuscripts. Winners are chosen in three categories: Fiction, creative nonfiction (added 2023), and poetry.

The press also publishes WWPH Writes, a bi-weekly digital literary journal launched in 2021 that showcases the work of writers from the Washington metropolitan area.

The press has received financial support through grants from the DC Commission on the Arts and Humanities, the Lannan Foundation, the National Endowment for the Arts, The Nation magazine, and the Poetry Society of America.
