= Beltway Poetry Quarterly =

Online literary magazine

Beltway Poetry Quarterly is an English-language, online literary magazine based in Washington, D.C., United States.
