= Woman Hollering Creek =

Stream in Texas, United States

Coordinates: 29°26′53″N 98°11′20″W

- Map

Location
- Country: United States
- State: Texas

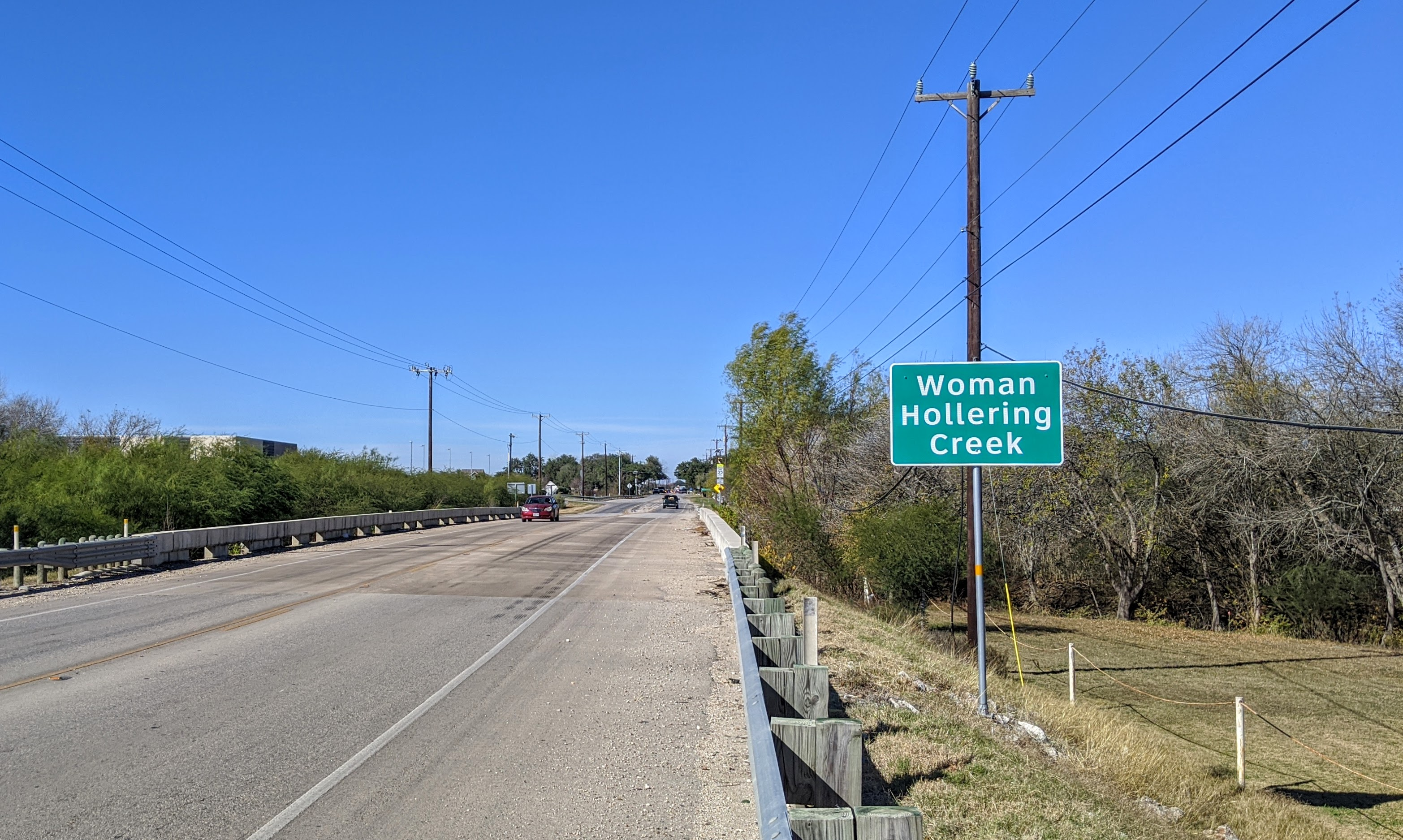
Bridge and road sign at Woman Hollering Creek, on highway F. M. 1518 just north of I-10.

Woman Hollering Creek is a creek in Bexar County, Texas, United States. At one point, it crosses Interstate 10, between Seguin, and San Antonio. It is a tributary of Martinez Creek, which is a tributary of Cibolo Creek, a tributary of the San Antonio River.

== Description ==
Alternatively known as Womans Hollow Creek, the creek's name is probably a loose translation of the Spanish La Llorona, or "the weeping woman". According to legend, a woman who has recently given birth drowns her newborn in the river because the father of the child either does not want it, or leaves with a different woman. The woman then screams in anguish from drowning her child. After her death, her spirit then haunted the location of the drowning and wails in misery. The legend has many different variations.

Author and poet Sandra Cisneros wrote a collection of short stories entitled Woman Hollering Creek and Other Stories in 1991.

The creek is the subject of the song "River Called Woman Hollering" by the Electric Boy Rangers.

== See also ==
- List of rivers of Texas
