= Josephinum =

Josephinum means house of Joseph and may refer to various buildings and institutions including:

- Josephinum Academy, a private all-girls school in Chicago, Illinois
- Josephinian Military Academy of Surgery in Vienna, 1784–1874, it now houses the Josephinum Medical Museum with a collection of anatomical wax models
- Pontifical College Josephinum a liberal arts college in Columbus, Ohio
