= Kristin Naca =

Latina and Fillipina American poet

Kristin Naca (born Washington, D.C.) is a Latina and Fillipina American poet.

== Life and education ==
Naca grew up in northern Virginia. She has a B.A. from the University of Washington, an MFA from the University of Pittsburgh, and a Ph.D. in English from the University of Nebraska–Lincoln.

Her poems have appeared in Poetry, ART PAPERS Bloom, Harpur Palate, Indiana Review, Prairie Schooner, Octopus Magazine, Seattle Review, Poetry Northwest, and Rio Grande Review.

Naca is a member of the prestigious Macondo Writers Workshop, the workshop founded by Sandra Cisneros.

She served as Writer In Residence with Minnesota Prison Writing Workshops. She lives in Minneapolis.

== Firing and subsequent lawsuit against Macalester College ==
In 2015, Naca was fired from her position as an Assistant Professor of Poetry at Macalester College due to alleged sexual misconduct reported by a former student. Naca sued Macalester in 2016, arguing that her firing was for discriminatory reasons, due to a disability and her status as a woman, a lesbian, a Filipina and Puerto Rican, and a Santeria priestess. In 2018, the judge in the case cleared Macalester of wrongdoing in the dismissal. On January 16, 2020, the Eighth Circuit Court of Appeals affirmed the lower court's dismissal of the lawsuit, holding that "[e]ven assuming Naca made a prima facie case, this court concludes, on de novo review, that Macalester articulates a legitimate, non-discriminatory reason for termination—her sexual relationship with Doe—that Naca does not counter with sufficient evidence of pretext".

== Awards ==
- mtvU National Poetry Series Prize. selected by Yusef Komunyakaa
- 2008 National Poetry Series
- Lannan Residency Fellowship
- Bread Loaf Fellowship
- Hedgebrook women writers in residence program on Whidbey Island

== Works ==
- "Baptism", The Blind Chatelaine's Keys
- "One Foot". Prairie Schooner. Spring 2009. Archived from the original on 2010-06-12.
- Bird Eating Bird. HarperCollins. 2009. ISBN 978-0-06-178234-3., a Lambda Literary Award Finalist in 2010
