= Woman Hollering Creek and Other Stories =

1991 short story collection by Sandra Cisneros

- First edition cover
- Author: Sandra Cisneros
- Cover artist: Susan Shapiro, Nivia Gonzales
- Language: English
- Genre: Short stories
- Publisher: Random House
- Publication date: April 3, 1991
- Publication place: United States
- Media type: Print (hardcover)
- Pages: 165 pp.
- ISBN: 0-679-73856-8
- OCLC: 24374139

Woman Hollering Creek and Other Stories is a book of short stories published in 1991 by the Mexican-American writer Sandra Cisneros. The collection reflects Cisneros's experience of being surrounded by American influences while still being familially bound to her Mexican heritage as she grew up north of the Mexico-US border.

These tales focus on the social role of women, and their relationships with the men and other women in their lives. The majority of the characters are stereotypes: men embody machismo while women are naïve and generally weak. Cisneros focuses on three feminine clichés: the passive virgin, sinful seductress, and traitorous mother. Not properly belonging to either Mexico or the United States, the Chicana protagonists earnestly search for their identity, only to discover abuse and shattered dreams. Apart from focusing on these issues of struggling women, Cisneros simultaneously develops the readers' sensitivity towards the lives of immigrants.

The vignettes are quite short on average; the longest is 29 pages, while the shortest is fewer than five paragraphs. Despite such limited space, Cisneros experiments with daring poetic prose in her storytelling; for example, each story presents a new character with a distinct literary voice and style. Such writing has earned her the title of an accomplished Chicana poet, with the added credentials of her published books of poetry My Wicked Wicked Ways (1987) and Loose Woman (1994).

== Background ==
From early on, a bond ran throughout Cisneros's family as a result of being separated from their homeland and having to live as Mexican-Americans in Chicago. Cisneros was born into a family of seven children and was often singled out as she was the only daughter. Despite the abundance of sibling playmates, Cisneros always felt lonely as a child, thus prompting her to begin creating stories to vary her daily routine.

After many years of writing, Cisneros used Woman Hollering Creek and Other Stories to explore the failed relationships of the female characters via their reactions to the men in their lives. This feminine focus in the stories may reflect Cisneros's own views on relationships, as she does not appear to have a strong connection to any male figures in her life: "For her, men seem to be a utility that a woman turns on and off as required." As the writing is from a Mexican-American immigrant's point of view, this feminism contends not only with the stereotype of gender, but of class and race as well. Cisneros "creates stories, not explanations or analyses or arguments", which describe her feminist views with "more provisional, personal, emotional, and intuitive forms of narrative".

An example of her feminine focus is found in the title story "Woman Hollering Creek", which concentrates on a woman who is physically abused by her husband and feels drawn towards the nearby creek. She becomes depressed and sits beside the water with her new baby, contemplating how a woman could be driven crazy. Cisneros develops this tale, which has also been found slightly modified in Aztec, Greek, and Spanish cultures, from the legend of La Llorona (Spanish for "weeping woman"), a ghost story found in Mexico and Texas. In the myth, "a beautiful young woman named Maria falls in love and marries a handsome, rich boy, and their union is blessed with two sons and a daughter". Soon after, the man loses his affection for his wife. Maria, knowing that her husband no longer loves her, drowns their three children in the river and then herself. Upon reaching heaven, Maria is told that she cannot enter until she has found her children. She is sent back to Earth, where she wails sorrowfully for her children. According to legend, any child that happens upon her ghost is pulled into the river and drowned. The real Woman Hollering Creek, a body of water just off Interstate 10 in Texas, is the river which Cisneros mentions in her story. The protagonist in “Woman Hollering Creek" is rescued from her abusive husband by two strangers before she goes mad.

== Plot summaries ==
Cisneros's collection of stories is divided into three sections. The first section, which focuses on the innocence of the characters during childhood, is called "My Lucy Friend Who Smells Like Corn". The following section, called "One Holy Night", includes two short stories highlighting the troublesome adolescent years of its characters. The final section, called "There Was a Man, There Was a Woman", concentrates on characters during their tumultuous adulthood. Most of the stories in the collection are between one and fifteen pages in length; "Eyes of Zapata", the longest story, is 29 pages long, while "Salvador Late or Early" and "There Was a Man, There Was a Woman" each occupies a single page.

The first and second plot of the story in this book shares the title, "My Lucy Friend Who Smells Like Corn", with its corresponding section and is a short narrative about an unnamed narrator and her best friend Lucy Anguiano, the "Texas girl who smells like corn". This vignette offers a snapshot into life just north of the United States-Mexico border for two girls who are presumably of Mexican descent. Lucy's home is portrayed as a low-income, Mexican-American family. Her mother is overworked and busy with many children while her father is rarely around. However, the story focuses on the freedom that the girls have when no one of authority is watching; for example, waving at strangers, jumping on mattresses, scratching mosquito bites, picking scabs, and somersaulting in dresses.

The book's second segment, "One Holy Night", contains two short narratives focusing on adolescent females and the way their self-worth is affected by the tension of remaining loyal to Mexico while integrating into the American lifestyle. The title story "One Holy Night" introduces the reader to a young teenage girl, Ixchel, who, in her quest for true love, meets a 37-year-old man named Chato. He lies to her about belonging to ancient Mayan royalty, seduces her, and then abandons her, only to return in an attempt to kill her. In her youth and naivety, Ixchel desires to be romanced by someone with alleged Mexican roots, only to be disappointed by the reality of having fallen in love with a Mexican-American serial killer.

The final section, entitled "There Was A Man, There Was A Woman", includes the title story "Women Hollering Creek", "Eyes of Zapata", and "Never Marry A Mexican", these being three out of the thirteen stories contained in this portion of the book. The title story, "Woman Hollering Creek", is about a Mexican woman, named Cleófilas, who marries Juan Pedro Martínez Sánchez. After moving across the border to Seguín, Texas, her hopes of having a happy marriage, like the characters she watches in the telenovelas, are dashed. Throughout their marriage, Juan Pedro is unfaithful, abusive and often leaves her in isolation. As her depression increases, so does her interest in the legendary figure, La Llorona, and the creek named after her that runs behind her house. However, unlike this "weeping woman", who chooses death as a means to escape her unloving husband, Cleófilas, in a sense, chooses life. With the aid of two independent women, Felice and Graciela, she is able to leave her life of abuse and escape back to Mexico.

Clemencia is the Chicana protagonist of the story "Never Marry a Mexican", who experiences rejection by her white lover. She takes revenge on this man by luring his naive son into a lover's role, and makes it known that in due time, this young man will inevitably pay for his father's transgressions.

"Eyes of Zapata" is a story that looks into the life of female protagonist, Inés, who offers a reflection on her life in the context of her illegitimate relationship with Mexican revolutionary Emiliano Zapata. She struggles with being constantly abandoned by her lover, who is off "revolutionizing the country", and she describes her efforts to raise a family on her own despite hardships such as famine, disease, and poverty. In the end, she speaks about Zapata's assassination, revealing his failure to the revolution and Inés makes it evident that essentially, Zapata, her unfaithful lover, has failed her and this protagonist is left clinging to dreams that can no longer exist.

== Characters ==
As this book is a collection of short stories and contains many different protagonists, the following is a selection of the book's main characters who most exemplify the qualities of the three sections of the book (youth, adolescence, and adulthood), or who have the most impact on Cisneros's use of female archetypes:

Lucy Anguiano, the childhood friend of the narrator in "My Lucy Friend Who Smells Like Corn", is a dark skinned, Texas girl with eyes like knife slits. She is from a family with nine children, an exhausted mother and an absent father. She influences the narrator's desire to share in the unadulterated and simple pleasures that childhood can bring.

Ixchel, the self-named protagonist of "One Holy Night", is a thirteen-year-old girl who lives in Chicago with her uncle and grandmother who immigrated from Mexico. Employed by her uncle, every Saturday, this young teen sells produce from his pushcart. Ixchel being a foolish girl, ignorantly gives herself to one of her customers, a captivating, yet dangerous 37-year-old man. Over time, she realises that she has been seduced by a mass murderer but remains unable to reconcile herself with the fact that she is still in love with him.

Chaq Uxmal Paloquín is another self-named character in the story "One Holy Night", nicknamed Boy Baby, but whose real name is Chato, which means fat-face. He was born on the streets, along with numerous brothers and sisters, in a Mexican town called Miseria. In this story he has grown up and is now a 37-year-old serial killer who seduces and then abandons the young, naïve protagonist by romanticizing her with a lie about being from an ancient line of Mayan kings.

Inés, the protagonist in "Eyes of Zapata", whose mother was raped and murdered for living an illegitimate lifestyle, is the mistress of Mexican revolutionary Emiliano Zapata. Inés struggles with being defined by the different roles she must play in her relationship with her lover. She is frustrated with the power of the male patriarchy that pushes her to be not only Zapata's lover, but also the mother to two of his children and his "political sister" in their shared fight for freedom.

Cleófilas is the protagonist of the title story "Woman Hollering Creek", who recreates the image of la llorona. She is a traditional Mexican woman who naïvely allows her father to give her in marriage to a man who would become her abusive, unfaithful husband. However, through the hardships of her marriage, she is empowered, to fight for her rights. This is solidified when she meets Felice and Graciela, two independent, wage-earning women who act as new role models for Cleófilas. In the end, they help her escape this abusive lifestyle.

Clemencia is the Chicana protagonist of "Never Marry a Mexican", whose life choices can be related to those of the historical figure La Malinche, an indigenous woman who befriended the Spanish Conquistadors in the 16th century. Both La Malinche and Clemencia were mistresses to men of a different ethnicity than their own, "doomed to exist within a racial and class-cultural wasteland, unanchored by a sense of ever belonging either to [their] ethnic or [their] natal homeland". Clemencia's final revenge in this vignette is not only a triumph in the memory of La Malinche, but also for the women who feel that their value depreciates if they do not have a husband.

Rosario (Chayo) De Leon is a character who writes the last prayer note in "Little Miracles, Kept Promises"; a collection of letters in Cisneros's book, from Mexican-Americans to the Virgin of Guadalupe, the patron saint of Mexico who symbolizes female virginity. Chayo's letter provides a contrast between the Virgin of Guadalupe and La Malinche. She illustrates the difficulties of living as a modern Chicana with her beliefs on religion, race, and gender being constantly challenged. In attempts to free herself from being caught in between her modern day Chicana lifestyle and her Mexican heritage she begins to redefine who she is as a woman. In order to do this Chayo must accept that she is not quite malinche or virgin and she does this by acknowledging "the Virgin's pacifism and Malinche's sexuality through knowledge of her own Indian heritage".

== Themes ==
There are many themes found in this book; some that are recurring are roles in society, religion, relationships, and also the hybrid nature of American and Mexican identities. Within these short stories Cisneros concentrates on the identities which women appropriate as a result of relationships, and how these are connected with their roles in society. Critic Mary Reichart observes that in Cisneros's previous work as well as "in Woman Hollering Creek (1991), the female characters break out of the molds assigned to them by the culture in search of new roles and new kinds of relationships. Cisneros portrays women who challenge stereotypes and break taboos, sometimes simply for the sake of shocking the establishment, but most often because the confining stereotypes prevent them from achieving their own identity." An example of this is Cleófilas, who had hoped for a better life after leaving her home in Mexico to live in the United States. The soap operas she had seen had led her to believe that her life was going to be a fairy tale. Instead, with a failing marriage and another child on the way she sees that her life resembles only the saddest aspects of a soap opera. Another example of this is found in the final section of this book, entitled "There Was A Man, There Was A Woman", where Cisneros illustrates how women can use their bodies as political instruments in their attempts to fight against male domination. The two female protagonists in "Never Marry a Mexican" and "Eyes of Zapata" use their bodies in attempts to gain recognition and acceptance from husband and lover. However, in doing so, they face the problems of objectification and oppression; two issues which end up adversely shaping the characters' identities. In the end, the illegitimate societal roles of these women influence their quest for female identity. For example, Inés, in "Eyes of Zapata", talks about the role she plays as lover, not a wife: "You married her, that woman from Villa de Ayala, true. But see, you came back to me. You always come back. In between and beyond the others. That's my magic. You come back to me."

The protagonists are examined not only as individuals, but also by how they connect to people in their lives, such as in the conflicting love and failed relationships between man and woman; mother and daughter. For example, critic Elizabeth Brown-Guillory notes of the story "Never Marry a Mexican": "Cisneros portrays the mother as a destructive emotional force, alienating and condemning her daughter to repeating her own mother’s destructive powers." This unsuccessful relationship between daughter and mother also affects the ways in which the women relate to men, as the mother is left at fault for any problematic situations with the daughter's male companions. For example, the daughter Clemencia remembers: "Never marry a Mexican, my ma said once and always. She said this because of my father. ... I’ll [Clemencia] never marry. Not any man."

Cisneros also incorporates religion as she "pays tribute to the faith of simple people who express their petitions and gratitude." This is especially apparent in her story "Little Miracles, Kept Promises", where people make petitions to the Virgen Mary, such as: "Madrecita de Dios, Thank you. Our child is born healthy! Rene y Janie Garza, Hondo, TX."

From the experience of growing up within two cultures Cisneros was able to combine both ethnicities, and in her stories she develops a major theme of hybridity between the American and Mexican cultures. She draws upon her life experience as she "depicts the situation of the Mexican-American woman: typically caught between two cultures, she resides in a cultural borderland. The topics of the stories range from the confusions of a bicultural and bilingual childhood to the struggles of a dark-skinned woman to recognize her own beauty in the land of Barbie dolls and blond beauty queens." Because these issues are complex, Cisneros does not try to resolve all of them. Instead, she attempts to find neutral ground where the characters can try to meld their Mexican heritage with an American lifestyle, without feeling homesick for a country which, in some cases, the women have not even experienced.

Although the book has recurring themes such as, (Chicana) feminism, Cisneros uses her power of observation so her stories and narrative are not overwhelmed by these themes. This feminism is portrayed as "women who establish identities for themselves, but also develop an independent, confident, even exultant sexuality". Not only this, but they learn to "love...[men] as they wish, and to establish sisterhood, mutually supportive relationships with other women."

Cisneros displays an abundance of poetic prose which uses frankness to captivate an audience. Reviewer Susan Wood suggests the reader sees that "Cisneros is a writer of power and eloquence and great lyrical beauty". Critic Deborah L. Madsen has said that "the narrative techniques of her fiction demonstrate daring technical innovations, especially in her bold experimentation with literary voice and her development of a hybrid form that weaves poetry into prose to create a dense and evocative linguistic texture of symbolism and imagery that is both technically and aesthetically accomplished". Madsen emphasizes Cisneros's creative ability to combine both prose and poetry.

She also changes her narrative mode according to the demands of the story. For example, her narrative point of view almost continually changes, sometimes using first person, as we see in the story "Little Miracles, Kept Promises", and sometimes third person, as in "La Fabulosa: a Texas Operetta". Additionally, "Never Marry a Mexican" is characterized by the consistent use of interior monologue. Cisneros used this style in her previous novel The House on Mango Street where she mastered writing from the point of view of Esperanza; however, "moving on meant experimenting with many voices". She accomplished this in Woman Hollering Creek where she uses "a complex variety of voices and points of view." Moore Campbell states that "[it] is this deluge of voices that Ms. Cisneros so faithfully taps in her work."

Cisneros intertwines the American and Mexican cultures linguistically, as "[her] stories are full of Spanish words and phrases. She clearly loves her life in two worlds, and as a writer is grateful to have 'twice as many words to pick from ... two ways of looking at the world.' A sometime poet, Cisneros uses those words so precisely that many of her images stick in a reader's mind. Of two people kissing, for instance, she writes: 'It looked as if their bodies were ironing each other's clothes.' "

== Reception ==
Cisneros has been honored with several awards as a result of Woman Hollering Creek and Other Stories, including the PEN Center West Award for best fiction, the Lannan Foundation Literary Award, the Quality Paperback Book Club New Voices Award, and, in 1993, the Anisfield-Wolf Book Award. K. Prescott states that once the book was published, Woman Hollering Creek and Other Stories was well-received because women of many cultures could relate to the stories: "Cisneros surveys woman's condition—a condition that is both precisely Latina and general to women everywhere. Her characters include preadolescent girls, disappointed brides, religious women, consoling partners and deeply cynical women who enjoy devouring men. They are without exception strong girls, strong women." Marcia Tager comments again on the characters, saying that Cisneros "writes with humour and love about people she knows intimately". For critic Ilan Stavans, the stories are not just words, but "a mosaic of voices of Mexican-Americans who joke, love, hate and comment on fame and sexuality... They are verbal photographs, memorabilia, reminiscences of growing up in a Hispanic milieu." The American Library Journal and The New York Times honoured Woman Hollering Creek and Other Stories as a noteworthy book of the year. The New York Times reviewer Bebe Moore Campbell wrote in 1991 that "[these] stories about women struggling to take control of their lives traverse geographical, historical and emotional borders and invite us into the souls of characters as unforgettable as the first kiss". Apart from much praise, one criticism is that Cisneros stereotypes Hispanic men and women in her stories. Stavans argues that the males "are always abusive, alcoholic and egotistical", while the women are "naïve [and] doll-like".

Susan Wood comments on the publication of Woman Hollering Creek by Random House: "Despite the growing number and influence of Latinos in the USA, the only identifiably Latin's names–with a few exceptions like Oscar Hijuelos–on books published by major houses are those translations of Latin American novels."
