= Angel Rodriguez-Diaz =

Puerto Rican painter (1955–2023)

Rodríguez-Díaz with Antifaz: Forget the Alamo. Yellow Rose (2004), one of his many self-portraits in which he wears a Mexican wrestling mask. The background was spray-painted through stenciled cloth.

Ángel Rodríguez-Díaz (December 6, 1955 – March 31, 2023), also known as Angel Luis Rodríguez-Díaz, was an American artist from Puerto Rico. He began his career as an artist while a student in Puerto Rico, before moving to New York in 1978, and San Antonio in 1995. He is best known for his portraits and dramatized self-portraits, as well as his public art installations.

== Biography ==
=== Early life ===
Angel Rodríguez-Díaz was born on December 6, 1955, in Santurce, a barrio of San Juan, Puerto Rico. During the first two years of his life, he spent a lot of time in the hospital due to a hernia. His father was born in a middle-class family near the Roosevelt Roads Naval Station in Ceiba, and his mother was born to a poor family in Santurce, but attended the Conservatory of Music of Puerto Rico thanks to money sent from relatives in the Bronx. When Rodriguez-Diaz was born, his parents were 19 and 18, respectively. Both parents were Roman Catholics, but his mother became a born again Pentecostal when she fell ill, and his father converted a few years later. Rodriguez-Diaz had to reconcile this with the fact he knew he was gay at a somewhat young age, which he called "something that was innate."

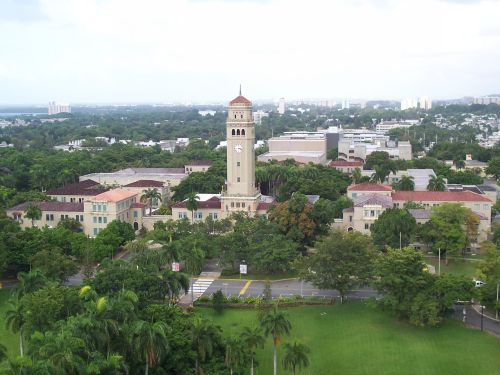
Rodriguez-Diaz studied at the University of Puerto Rico, Río Piedras Campus, before moving to the United States.

In 1971, at the age of 31, his mother died from a blood-related disease. His father, who drove a truck and delivered dirt to construction sites, was left alone to raise Rodriguez-Diaz and his four younger siblings, but remarried less than a year later. His father would later become a Pentecostal minister and for three years Rodriguez-Diaz attended the same seminary his father attended. Three of his siblings would grow up to be musicians, and his sister, a missionary. His father died penniless in 2003.

Rodriguez-Diaz's interest in art started at a young age when he would watch his mother draw on a notebook. When he was around seven or eight, one of Rodriguez-Diaz's cousins gave him drawing pads, charcoal, and kneaded erasers. In seventh grade, he won a contest for his painting of José de Diego, his first portrait. During his teen years, he focused on his studies and art as an escape from dealing with his mother's illness. He later began painting seasonal murals at Miguel de Cervantes Saavedra High School and, for a 12th grade project, painted an interpretation of Michelangelo's Head of a Lost Soul found in the Sistine Chapel. His first commission was at a restaurant. He graduated from high school in 1974.

=== Education ===
Rodríguez-Díaz received a scholarship to attend the University of Puerto Rico, Río Piedras Campus, where he won an honorary prize for a painting during his freshman year. In 1975 Rodriguez-Diaz held his first solo exhibition, which took place in Carnegie Library, the university library, where he displayed his paintings and drawings. One of the paintings in the exhibition, his first self-portrait, was sold, as were most of the works. The first review of his art, which appeared in El Mundo, was titled Ha Nacido Una Estella (A Star Has Been Born). Later during his college years, one of his paintings was displayed at the Museum of History, Anthropology and Art of the University of Puerto Rico. He studied printmaking, photography, and other arts. During this time, Rodriguez-Diaz cited Francisco Rodón as one of his inspirations. He was also deeply moved by the paintingTwo Figures by Francis Bacon, who was an important early influence. He graduated from the university with a Bachelor of Fine Arts.

Rodriguez-Diaz left Puerto Rico in 1978 to study at New York University (NYU). He felt isolated when he arrived in New York City because he only spoke Spanish. For the first time, he was able to observe how Puerto Rico was viewed by people in the United States. Rodriguez-Diaz had nowhere to stay until a friend introduced him to a lesbian couple, who let him live at their place for a few months. It took him over a year to be able to speak basic English. Meanwhile, he entered into his first gay relationship, which lasted around a year. He subsequently dated the writer Manuel Ramos Otero for around three years. Rodriguez-Diaz felt embraced by the local Puerto Rican community, and in New York he learned more about the Puerto Rico statehood movement. He later left NYU and obtained his MFA from Hunter College in 1982, which included the artist Robert Morris on the faculty. But this was the age of conceptual art, and his advisor told him that he did not want paintings. Rodríguez-Díaz studied paintings in books and in the New York museums. Because of the hostility to painting and to figural art, Rodríguez-Díaz considered himself to be a self-taught artist.

=== Career and personal life ===
The Protagonist of an Endless Story (1993) is a portrait of Sandra Cisneros.

After graduating, Rodriguez-Diaz lost his first job and became a makeup artist on mannequins in Brooklyn. He left that job to work for Rootstein, a prominent mannequin company in New York City. When he had little time for making art, the artist did a quick self-portrait drawing in charcoal each day, using a mirror. These drawings include State of Mind #5 (1982) and State of Mind #9 (1982). The latter is deeply influenced by El Greco, and it also has allusions to the grotesques of Michelangelo. Features in The Annunciation, a drawing from 1986 that serves as a farewell to his gravely ill former lover Otero, have been connected to a painting by Giovanni di Paolo in the Metropolitan Museum and one by Cimabue in the Frick Collection. HIs painting Tsuchigumo, described as a depiction of Otero "single-mindedly" emerging from Hudson River piers, summoning the viewer to his “traveling theater,” served as the cover of Otero's last book.

Rodríguez-Díaz had his first exhibition at the Hunter Gallery in New York City. Soon after, another show took place at the Cayman Gallery in the city, a gallery where Latino artists were welcomed. This was followed by a solo exhibition at the Museum of Art of Puerto Rico, in addition to several group exhibitions in New York City and Mexico City. After Black Monday in 1987, he lost his job painting mannequins and received unemployment benefits for the next year. During this time, Rodriguez-Diaz was able to focus more on his art. Rodriguez-Diaz began dating George Gillon who later contracted AIDS and was hospitalized. Gillon urged him to be tested, and this is when Rodriguez-Diaz also received the diagnosis in the late 1980s of being HIV positive, and the couple separated.

While he was unemployed, Rodriguez-Diaz participated in solo exhibitions at the Zolla/Lieberman Gallery in Chicago and Mendelson Gallery in Pittsburgh. His next job was working as an accountant, where he stayed for a year before being laid off. The free time allowed him to work in his own studio in Brooklyn, which he rented for a few years. After moving back to Manhattan, Rodriguez-Diaz continued to paint more portraits.

One group exhibition held at the Housatonic Museum of Art was reviewed by The New York Times, which said Rodriguez-Diaz was inspired by Salvador Dalí. Rodriguez-Diaz lived in New York City for 16 years, before moving to San Antonio where he focused not only on paintings, but public art installations as well. He immediately felt a connection to Mexican Americans in the area, as he saw them as a colonized people, like Puerto Ricans. A photographer friend from New York wrote in 2015 that Rodríguez-Díaz became a “TexaRican.”

In San Antonio, he and his partner Rolando Briseño purchased a former grocery store in the Beacon Hill neighborhood and converted it into a studio for Rodríguez-Díaz. They lived in a nearby Spanish-style building. In an interview with the Los Angeles Times, Rodriguez-Diaz said he felt the most comfortable in San Antonio because his works were more appreciated by the city's Latino community. During the late 1990s, most of his exhibitions, both solo and group, took place in San Antonio.

=== Exhibitions in Texas ===
The artist had a solo show of small paintings in 1997 called the “Tienda de los Milagros” at By Marcel/The Collection in San Antonio. It featured paintings of body parts in reference to the ex voto images utilized in the Latin Catholic tradition. The paintings were modeled by members of San Antonio's arts community. In 1998, Rodríguez-Diaz created an installation at Artpace in San Antonio that drew parallels between the Spanish–American War and the Mexican War. It including the rallying cries of "Remember the Maine" and "Remember the Alamo in chalk drawings on walls that faced one another." Rodíguez-Díaz exhibited 12 paintings at the Southwest School of Art in 2005 in an exhibition called "Reflections in the Mirror. Tiphanie Yanique emphasized the baroque qualities of his work--even in his wrestler portraits--in a review of that show when it traveled to the Rudolph Projects | ArtScan Gallery in Houston in 2005. In 2006 he had a solo show called “Retratos… Between You and 'I'” at the Blue Star Contemporary Art Center in San Antonio.

He had three large exhibitions in the 2000s in Texas. They include self-portraits where he is wearing a Mexican-style wrestling mask, which represents his absorption of Mexican popular culture as well as his status as a cultural warrior. A solo exhibition at the Beeville Art Museum in 2004 called "Santos y Pecadores" featured 49 works by Rodriguez-Diaz painted between 1993 and 2003. He also had a large one-person show at the Mexican Cultural Institute in San Antonio in 2004 called “Angel Rodriguez-Diaz, Retratos: 1990-2005.” His largest show was in 2017. "Ángel Rodríguez-Díaz: A Retrospective, 1982-2014," at Centro de Artes (the former Museo Alameda) in San Antonio, featured about 60 pieces, including newly rediscovered art works that were publicly exhibited for the first time. That retrospective was augmented by two satellite exhibitions in 2017 at FL!GHT: “Ángel Rodríguez-Díaz: Nueva York-San Antonio,” and “Ángel Rodríguez-Díaz: El Mero Chile/The Full Monty.” In 2018 Rodriguez-Díaz was featured in a group exhibition at Artpace. In 2024, Rodríguez-Díaz was one of 12 deceased artists honored at the Mexic-Arte Museum's annual Día de los Muertos exhibition in Austin.

=== Paintings ===
Two early New York period paintings reflect the artists Rodríguez-Díaz self-studied. Untitled [Dog and Suspended Body] (1982) is an homage to Francis Bacon that arguably comments on the Spanish Conquest of the Americas. Babilonia (1985), with its mirrored reflections, is structured on Édouard Manet's Le Bar aux Folies-Bergére (1882); stylistically, it references German Expressionism. Babilonia features quotes or references to Edvard Munch, Pieter Bruegel, Georges Seurat, Vincent Van Gogh, Paul Gauguin, and John Heartfield.

Rodríguez-Díaz also painted his important Goddess Triptych in New York. It depicts monumental images of nude, self-possessed women of color to celebrate diversity, both racial and body-type. The first canvas,The Myth of Venus (1991) was modeled on a Dominican woman named Australia Marte. The centerpiece,Yemayá (1993), represents the goddess of the sea, and was modeled by Diana Fraser, a black woman. The final canvas, La Primavera (1994), was modeled by Sandra Payne, a black woman. According to the artist, one of the models (which he did not identify) was transexual. Rodríguez-Díaz's art historical references include Botticelli, Peter Paul Rubens, and Yemoja, the Yoruba goddess. The San Antonio Museum of Art purchased Yemayá (it already owned the other two canvases, which had been donated by Sandra Cisneros) and made the Goddess Triptych the focus of an exhibition in 2024–2025.

The Visitation and Red Interior, two harrowing paintings from 1988, are premonitions of the artist's HIV positive diagnosis. At the time he made these paintings, the artist feared that people who tested positive for HIV could be sent to concentration camps. Mirrored Mirror (1990), described as "a confident and proud gay man who wears his leather jacket like a knight wears a coat of armor," references the robust, early style of his favorite artist, the Spanish master Diego Velázquez, as well as the paradoxical mirroring effects of Velázquez's Las Meninas (1656).

The Protagonist of an Endless Story (1995) depicts Sandra Cisneros, who traded the painting back to the artist in exchange for two of the Goddess paintings. The Protagonist of an Endless Story was purchased from the artist by the Smithsonian American Art Museum (SAAM). According to the SAAM, "Cisneros stands before a fiery sunset, dressed in a traditional Mexican skirt embroidered with sequined imagery that refers to her profession as a writer. Her commanding pose, reminiscent of historic European portraiture, proclaims that she will endure in her native landscape." The painting was discussed in several reviews of the traveling exhibition "From the West."

El Chupacabra (1998), the only painting in the 1998-1999 Artpace installation in San Antonio, is a self-portrait of the artist (with a goat's skull on his head) evading U.S. helicopters. The Latino immigrant, it is argued, "is like the chupacabra [which first appeared in Puerto Rico]: simultaneously demon and victim, he is dispossessed and hunted--even in his native land."

In 1999, Rodríguez-Díaz painted another portrait of Cisneros called La Guadalupana, in which an apparition of the Virgin of Guadalupe appears alongside her image. This conjunction references Cisneros' short story “Guadalupe the Sex Goddess.” The resemblance between the two figures has been interpreted as "a way of representing Guadalupe as a real woman, and conversely, Cisneros as a goddess."

Atlantis: Pre-Emptive Strike? ... Coming Back to Haunt You (2003) features an underwater masked wrestler who reacts to George W. Bush's Iraq war with dismay. Antifaz: Forget the Alamo. Yellow Rose (2004) features another masked wrestler who recoils from the myth of the Alamo and that of the Yellow Rose of Texas. Antifaz was deemed "one of the most stunning images in “The Other Side of the Alamo” exhibition in 2018 by a San Antonio critic. The Good Old Days (2005) is a monumental, oil-besmirched self-portrait that comments on ecological degradation and wealth disparity.

=== Technique ===
Rodríguez-Díaz preferred oil to acrylic, because he thought it was more organic and better captured the appearance of human flesh. His preference for human models was not practical in New York, since it took weeks to complete a painting. He developed a slide-based technique. Rodríguez-Díaz photographed his model, then projected a slide onto the canvas, eliminating the need for preparatory drawings.

Rodríguez-Díaz began using stencils to create small spheres in the background of the painting Primordial Feeling (1990). He sometimes utilized multiple stencils to create layered background effects, as in La Chupacabra, which has spheres, a snakeskin pattern, and palm trees. He sprayed acrylic paint through stenciled cloth, so his later works use both oil and acrylic.

=== Museum and Public Collections ===
Rodríguez-Díaz's works are in the permanent collections of several museums. In addition to the Goddess Triptych, the San Antonio Museum of Art owns the painting Circulos de Confusíon (1993), which is the first painting Rodríguez-Díaz made in Mexico. The McNay Art Museum in San Antonio owns the print Stepping into the Light - Quinceañera (2008). In addition to SAAM, Rodríguez-Díaz's art is also in the collections of the National Museum of Mexican Art in Chicago, El Museo del Barrio in New York City, and El Museo de Arte Contemporáneo de Puerto Rico in San Juan, Puerto Rico.

The University of Texas at San Antonio owns Angel The Butterfly (2004). Rodríguez-Díaz's Reunion (2008) was acquired by the city of San Antonio for the Henry B. Gonzalez Convention Center in 2018.

=== Public Artworks ===
In addition to paintings, almost all of which included portraits or self-portraits, Rodríguez-Díaz created a large mural, titled Birth of a City, for the San Antonio government's Development and Business Service Center. Completed in 2003, the artist overpainted a photographic collage of the city, which was scanned and printed on canvases. Rodriguez-Diaz also made a public artwork in his neighborhood. The Beacon, a 28-foot (8.5 m) cut-metal obelisk, is a sundial by day. At night, it projects light like a traditional Mexican luminaria. Luminarias, made of paper or tin, project candle light through stencil-cut piercings. The Beacon, installed in 2008, stands on a roundabout at the intersection of Blanco Road and Fulton Street. Artistic references in the cut-out patterns range from pre-Columbian motifs to Art Deco patterns. “It’s the accessibility to the public and that people can enjoy it [The Beacon] without any kind of constraints of a gallery,” Rodriguez-Díaz told the San Antonio Express-News. “That’s my main drive, to create something that everybody can enjoy because it’s out in the neighborhood.”

Las Tres Marias, a large oil painting utilizing three local Latinas, was commissioned by the Cathedral of San Fernando. The University Health System Hospital commissioned a glass curtain called DNA: Mosaic of Our Humanity (2013). Rodríguez-Díaz also made four medium-sized murals and 57 small murals for the medical center, completed in 2014. Inspired by the artist's own DNA, the 120 ft. long, two-story curtain has been called the "largest and perhaps most impressive piece of artwork in the hospital."

The San Antonio government commissioned The Crossroads of Enlightenment, also completed in 2014. It is the largest of his public art works. The two luminaria towers are made of steel, and allude to the smokestacks found at the nearby Alamo Quarry Market. The stone and concrete bases refer to the fact that the area had been a quarry. "The tower on the east side of Blanco bears the name 'Cementville,' a reference to the company village founded in 1908 where generations of impoverished Mexican American workers lived and died." The other tower, called “Los Angeles Heights,” refers to the present day neighborhood. In 2015, Rodríguez-Díaz painted the official portrait of Phil Hardberger, who was mayor of San Antonio from 2005 to 2009.

=== Death and legacy ===
On March 31, 2023, Rodríguez-Díaz died in San Antonio at age 67, survived by his husband Briseño. The photographic quality of Rodríguez-Díaz's paintings and his propensity for self-portraiture were noted. Artist and professor Ricky Armendariz said "He was literally one of the most talented — technically and conceptually — artists that I've ever met, bar none...His work was hard hitting at times. His work was about identity, pain and loss." After hearing of his death, Cisneros called Rodriguez-Diaz "a gentleman and a genius." Curator Ruben C. Cordova said he created "uniquely original works by using self-portraiture as a vehicle for social criticism." Many of his paintings have political or social content, which cover a range of topics, including ecology and the U.S. oil industry, American imperialism, war, social inequality, cultural invisibility, and attitudes towards people living with HIV.

In a 2006 statement, the artist referred to portraiture as a way to "explore thoughts of identity, power, passion, and the everyday masks we all wear," which he used to "depict, re-imagine, and to celebrate our social and cultural diversity." The San Antonio Current said Rodriguez-Diaz "attracted international attention for his ability to combine technical proficiency with political and social commentary to create an instantly recognizable visual style."

== See also ==
- List of Puerto Ricans
- Latin American art
- Puerto Rican art
