= Macondo Writers Workshop =

Writers' workshop in Texas, United States

The Macondo Writers Workshop is an association of socially-engaged professional level writers working to advance creativity, foster generosity, and serve community. Founded in 1995 by writer Sandra Cisneros and named after the town in Gabriel García Marquez's One Hundred Years of Solitude, the workshop gathers writers from all genres who work on geographic, cultural, economic, gender, and spiritual borders. An essential aspect of the Macondo Workshop is a global sense of community; participants recognize their place as writers in our society and the world.

== History ==
Macondo began over thirty years ago when author Sandra Cisneros gathered a group of writers, artists, scholars, and activists around her dining table in her King William home to meet informally for rigorous writing workshops. Under the direction of Cisneros, and during its brief time at the Guadalupe Cultural Arts Center, membership grew significantly. As such, Macondo has very established traditions and expectations that include a rigorous application process aimed at professional writers of all genres, and the "Compassionate Code of Conduct," a document drafted by a group of past Macondistas outlining the principles and ethics that govern our organization. Macondo has over two hundred lifetime members, many of whom have been with the association from the beginning and who continue to receive support from the Macondo community. Macondo has grown and solidified itself as a space of intense artistic and cultural creativity where writers, artists, thinkers, scholars, and critics can come together and inspire and challenge one another in order to incite change in our respective communities.

== Mission ==
Cisneros has described Macondo's mission as supporting and uniting writers "who view their work and talents as part of a larger task of community-building and non-violent social change." The anthropologist and writer Ruth Behar has described participants as "Americans of the other America, moving between cultures, languages, classes, homelands, translating our experience for ourselves and others."

== Writing faculty ==
Noted past faculty members have included Ai Ogawa, Dorothy Allison, Julia Alvarez, Richard Blanco, Andrei Codrescu, Rigoberto Gonzalez, Ruth Behar, Joy Harjo, Tim Z. Hernandez, Cherrie Moraga, Sherwin Bitsui, Benjamin Alire Sáenz, Cristina Rivera Garza, Kevin Young, Manuel Muñoz, Sarah Schulman, Naomi Shihab Nye, Elena Poniatowska, Luis J. Rodriguez, Norma Elia Cantú and Helena María Viramontes.

== Macondistas ==
The term "Macondistas" refers to authors and members of the writing community who are alumni of the Macondo Writers' Workshop. Writers and poets who have attended include: Pat Alderete, Francisco Aragon, Richard Blanco, Sarah A. Chavez, Wendy Call, Denise Chavez, Alex Espinoza, Alicia Gaspar de Alba, Carmen Giménez Smith, Jose B. Gonzalez, liz gonzález, Reyna Grande, Laurie Ann Guerrero, Allison Hedge Coke, Joe Jimenez, Amelia M.L. Montes, Kristin Naca, Amada Irma Pérez, Lourdes Portillo, Renato Rosaldo, Raul Salinas, Carmen Giménez Smith, Gary Soto, Ito Romo, William Sanchez, Carmen Tafolla, Anel I. Flores, Natalia Treviño, Carla Trujillo, Baldemar Velasquez, and Dan Vera.

== See also ==
- Sandra Cisneros
- List of writers' conferences
- McOndo
