= Caramelo =

2002 epic novel by Sandra Cisneros

- Author: Sandra Cisneros
- Cover artist: Gabriele Wilson
- Language: English/Spanish
- Genre: Adult Fiction
- Publisher: Knopf
- Publication date: September 30, 2002
- Publication place: United States/Mexico
- Media type: Hardcover
- Pages: 449
- ISBN: 0-679-43554-9

Caramelo is a 2002 epic novel spanning a hundred years of Mexican history by American author Sandra Cisneros. It was inspired by her Mexican heritage and childhood in the barrio of Chicago, Illinois. The main character, Lala, is the only girl in a family of seven children and her family often travels between Chicago and Mexico City. Because Cisneros also has six brothers and her family moved frequently when she was a child, the novel is semi-autobiographical. The novel could also be called a Bildungsroman, as it focuses on Lala's development from childhood onward. It was shortlisted for the 2004 International Dublin Literary Award. It was simultaneously released in English and Spanish, with the Spanish translation done by Liliana Valenzuela.

== Characters in Caramelo ==
- Celaya (Lala) – The narrator, and self-appointed family historian, Lala tells the story of the extended Reyes family, including a rich explanation of her parents' marriage and the surprising tale of how her "Awful Grandmother" (Soledad) met and married her "Little Grandfather" (Narciso) in Mexico. The history is so different from previous versions Soledad has told her family that Lala is often interrupted by her "Awful Grandmother" in order to correct Lala's version. As the youngest child and only daughter of seven children, Lala feels overshadowed by her brothers and unappreciated by her mother.
- Inocencio – Lala's father/Zoila's husband. The favored son of his mother, Soledad, Inocencio is nicknamed "el Tarzán" by his family, after he unsuccessfully swings from a tree and breaks both of his arms as a child. His fatherly affection and understanding of Lala is contrasted with a shameful, secretive nature that unravels itself as the story progresses. He runs an upholstering business with his brothers, but often disagrees with them about quality and passion for the furniture they agree to produce. Because of this, the Reyes upholstery business is only moderately successful.
- Zoila – Lala's mother/Inocencio's wife. Logical and careful, a sharp contrast to her mother-in-law. Zoila is not religious and doesn't trust anyone who says they are. Frugal and strict with her daughter, Lala often mistakes Zoila's nature as cruel. While her sons regard their mother as perfect, Lala questions her mother's love and passion for life. Their relationship seems to mirror the one between Aunty Light-Skin and Soledad.
- Soledad (Awful Grandmother) – At first presented as a meddling, old-fashioned, superstitious woman who favors one son over her other children, the second part of the story uncovers the painful reasons Soledad governs her family the way she does. Orphaned by her mother at eleven, her father handed the responsibility of raising her to a disinterested aunt who already had many children. Soledad's story with Narciso begins when she moves in with his family as a live-in servant. Happiness will find her when Inocencio is born, and she remains fiercely protective of him, seeking to be a greater influence over her son than even his wife, Zoila. Lala's narration is blisteringly honest, and often Soledad weeps as she breaks in to correct her granddaughter. In part three, she moves in with Inocencio and Zoila's family, where the narrator by telling about Candelaria. She is just generally unpleasant and brings the people down around her, but she has a strong relationship with Celaya it seems.
- Narciso (Little Grandfather) – Husband of Soledad, former military soldier. As a young man in Mexico, he fell in love with a glamorous performer, who did not return his affections. In turn, he generally views Soledad as a wife that is good, but not one who holds his heart. In an effort to connect with his grandchildren, he calls them "his troops" to reconnect with a feeling of camaraderie.
- Rafa (Rafael), Ito (Refugio), Tikis (Gustavo), Toto (Alberto), Lolo (Lorenzo), Memo (Guillermo) – Lala's brothers, sons of Inocencio and Zoila. All older, stereotypical men with machismo habits and rationale. Lala feels alternately outnumbered and entertained by them.
- Uncle Fat-Face (Federico) and Uncle Baby (Armando) – Brothers of Inocencio. Their nick-names are given to them by Soledad, even though they have outgrown them. The Reyes brothers work together in the upholstery business in Chicago. Every summer, they take their families on a caravan trip down to Mexico.
- Aunty Light-skin (Norma) – Inocencio's sister, who sometimes interrupts part of the narration. She relates to Lala because they both feel undervalued.
- Antonieta Araceli – Aunty Light-Skin's daughter by the man whose name shouldn't be mentioned. Caramelo pida pelo.
- Amor and Paz – Daughters of Uncle Baby and Aunty Ninfa.
- Eleuterio – Father of Narciso, married to Regina. Left his family in Spain and went to Mexico. Impregnated Regina, then fled back to Spain. Returned later and married her. A friend to Soledad and supposedly influences Narciso to marry her after she gets pregnant.
- Regina – Narciso's mother. She loves him very passionately. She makes most of the income selling things at flea markets. When the war breaks out, she gets very rich by basically becoming a trading post, specializing in cigarettes.
- Candelaria – Daughter of washerwoman. Not a large role in the novel, but her presence seems to infiltrate the whole thing because she is Inocencio's child out of wedlock.
- Elvis, Aristotle, and Byron – Uncle Fat-Face and Aunty Licha's children. Named after people she finds in her horoscope.
- Ernie (Ernesto) Calderon – A good catholic boy that is friends with Celaya's brothers. They get romantically interested and run away together, but Ernie ends up choosing his mother over Celaya.
- Exaltacion Henestrosa – Exotic woman who Narciso falls in love with while married to Soledad. She then leaves him for a female singer in a traveling circus, Panfila Pal

== Plot ==
The novel is told through the first-person narration of Celaya "Lala" Reyes and is divided into three parts: "Recuerdo de Acapulco" (English translation - "Memory/Souvenir of Acapulco"), "When I Was Dirt", and "The Eagle and the Serpent, or My Mother and My Father" - named for the two animals on the Mexican Flag. In Part One, "Recuerdo de Acapulco," the narrative begins with the three Reyes brothers, Inocencio (Lala's father), Uncle Fat-Face (Federico), and Uncle Baby (Armando), driving with their families from Chicago to Mexico City to visit "the Awful Grandmother" (Soledad), who Lala detests, and "the Little Grandfather" (Narciso), who Lala sees as an old man, weak from years of being nitpicked by his wife. The Grandparents live in Mexico City with the Reyes brothers' younger sister, Norma, who Lala calls "Aunty Light-Skin" and her daughter, Antonieta Araceli. During their stay, Lala plays with, and grows attached to, Candelaria, the daughter of the Grandparents' washerwoman, Amparo. Lala's parents don't approve of the friendship and eventually forbid Lala from interacting with her. During their stay, a birthday party is thrown for Lala's father, Inocencio, where the ceiling of the dining room collapses. Instead of the expected reaction, Lala's family begins to squabble about who is responsible for the disaster. Uncle Fat-Face and Uncle Baby leave, in angry protest, with their families, leaving Inocencio and his family to celebrate with the remaining family. They all decide to go to Acapulco, including Candelaria, who creates a palm leaf rose for Lala, a gift which falls into the ocean during a boat ride. Lala witnesses many things from a child's point of view, including seeing her grandmother, Soledad, tell Zoila, her mother, something very disturbing, though it isn't clear what. On the drive home, when Lala mentions how Candelaria's flower was lost, her mother laughs and accuses Inocencio of lying to her about a secret relationship. Zoila proceeds to physically and verbally attack him, eventually running into the heart of the plaza to have a heated exchange in public. The rest of the family watches until Inocencio's mother calms him down. She suggests he leave Zoila and return to her: “Wives come and go, but mothers, you only have one.” Zoila presents Inocencio with an ultimatum: choose between wife or mother. Inocencio chooses Zoila, driving her and the children back home.

In Part Two, "When I Was Dirt", the narrative switches to chronicle how Soledad and Narciso became the Awful Grandmother and the Little Grandfather. Soledad frequently interrupts Lala's narration to correct the details of the story. Eventually, the reader understands the narrative from both perspectives. Soledad, born between 1905 and 1906 to famous shawl makers, introduces her parents, Ambrosio and Guillermina Reyes, from Santa María del Río, San Luis Potosí Santa Maria Del Rio and San Luis Potosí. Guillermina, Soledad's mother, passes away when Soledad is just a child, leaving one unfinished caramelo rebozo. The color is described as ordinary, almost nondescript, but the shawl becomes Soledad's most prized possession, a metaphor for the liminal citizenship of the characters in the novel. Ambrosio, remarries and his new wife convinces him to send Soledad away to live in the capital with her Aunty Fina and her many children. There, Soledad works as a house servant, neglected by her aunt and sexually abused by her Uncle Pio. Soledad meets Narciso when he comes to the house to pay Aunty Fina for the week's laundry. She has an emotional breakdown, confiding in him about her life and current circumstances. He offers her to work at his house so she moves in with him and his parents, Eleuterio and Regina Reyes. The Mexican Revolution begins shortly after and during the Ten Tragic Days in 1913, Narciso has three of his ribs surgically removed after suffering a collapsed lung caused by fear when he was nearly killed by two soldiers on his way home. Later, in 1914, his mother sends him to live with his Uncle Old and his cousins in Chicago to escape the war. There, he falls in love with a young Josephine Baker, an African American, but when he informs his father of his plans to marry her, the shock of the news triggers a cerebral embolism which kills him. Narciso returns home for the funeral, but his father miraculously comes back from the dead, having only suffered a cataleptic attack, which leaves him partially paralyzed and mute. Upon reuniting with Soledad, the two begin a sexual relationship. Soledad becomes pregnant and Narciso plans to run away. Regina organizes an elaborate farewell supper for Narciso, in which Eleuterio and Soledad are both ignored by the guests. Enraged by their avarice and apathy, Eleuterio destroys Regina's merchandise, grabs Soledad, and speaks for the only time in his life, shouting, “We are not dogs!” This prompts Narciso to marry Soledad and they move to Oaxaca.

In Tehuantepec, Narcisco falls in love with Exaltación Henestrosa, a local merchant, and begins an extramarital affair with her, but she runs away with Panfila Palafox, a female singer from the traveling Circus Garabaldi. Soledad, devastated by her husband's infidelity, asks a tamal vendor for advice, who counsels her to fall in love again, which she does with her firstborn son, Inocencio. She then has three more children, but doesn't love any of them quite like her son. Her sons grow up and move to the United States. In 1945, Inocencio is arrested at a riot at a soccer match and meets ventriloquist Wenceslao Moreno in the Chicago police station. To avoid jail time and get his papers, Wenceslao convinces him to enlist and Inocencio is sent off to fight in World War 2. Zoila, who was recently rejected by her lover, Enrique Aragon, meets Inocencio at a dance. The two fall in love and eventually marry. When Celaya is born, Inocencio introduces her to Soledad, who is dismayed that she is no longer “his queen”.

Lastly is Part Three: The Eagle and the Serpent, or My Mother and My Father, which takes place seven years after Part One. Narciso crashed into a truck while driving and died of a heart attack. After his funeral, Soledad sells the house on Destiny Street and gives the money to Inocencio and his family, angering Uncle Fat-Face and Uncle Baby. Aunty-Light Skin tells Celaya how she met Antonieta Araceli's father: a riot ensued at El Blanquita Theater when the audience followed Tongolele backstage. Norma, who was trying to get her autograph, was pushed into a Cadillac with Tongolele and some of her friends. When Tongolele noticed her and asked her who she was, Antonieta Aracelia's father covered for her and said she was with him. The two began a relationship and were soon married by the court, which Soledad discredited on account of him already having been married twice and in a church. The two began to argue frequently, and one night, Norma discovered her husband had been unfaithful. He left to go live with his family in Jalisco, and after some time, she tried calling him to forgive him but was turned down by his family. She finally contacted him while he was at a hotel and it is heavily implied that he was still cheating on her. She divorced him shortly afterward and returned to live with her parents. She then gave birth to their daughter and raised her on her own.

Soledad comes to live with Innocencio and his family in Chicago, but struggles adjusting to city life. They purchase a new house and move to San Antonio, Texas. Celaya's relationship with her mother sours and she attends the local Catholic high school, Immaculate Conception, where she befriends Viviana “Viva” Ozuna, a provocative female classmate and is bullied by the other schoolgirls. Now 14, Celaya begins to sexually, mentally, and emotionally mature. Soledad falls ill, and as she carries her upstairs, Zoila contemplates killing her, but refrains from doing so when she notices Soledad's eye water. Soledad later succumbs to her illness and dies. After her death, Celaya is regularly haunted by her grandmother. She meets Ernie “Ernesto” Calderon, one of her brother's friends, and falls in love with him. The two rent a hotel room and sleep together. Celaya's plan is to become pregnant so her parents will give Ernie and her their blessing to marry. But when Ernie returns the next morning from mass, he changes his mind, out of guilt and loyalty to his mother. Celaya shamefully returns home to her heartbroken father.

The family move back to Chicago and Inocencio is hospitalized in the ICU after a heart attack. Before visiting him, Zoila informs Celaya of what it was Soledad told her on the boat deck all those years ago: Candelaria is Celaya's illegitimate half-sister. She was born before Zoila and Inocencio got married and everybody knew but nobody told her. Soledad then deliberately hired Amparo and Candelaria to live with her while Zoila and her family were visiting to pressure Zoila into divorcing Inocencio, but she refused. Celaya then sees an apparition of Soledad at Inocencio's bedside, preparing to reunite with her son in the afterlife. Celaya grabs her father and insults Soledad, to which she replies, “Well, that’s fine, because I’m you”. Soledad tearfully confesses to Celaya that she can't move on yet because she hasn't made amends with all the people she's hurt. She asks Celaya to tell her story and she agrees, in exchange for Inocencio's life. Soledad begins, leading to the events of Part Two. True to her word, Inocencio wakes up and recovers. After he returns home, Inocencio and Zoila celebrate their 30th wedding anniversary. At the party, Celaya realizes she has "become" Soledad for her love of Inocencio and resolves to “make room in her heart” for Soledad as well. Inocencio dances with Celaya and tells that Soledad conceived him out of wedlock and Narciso planned on abandoning her until Eleuterio convinced him otherwise. Inocencio swears Celaya to secrecy and she agrees, after revealing all of her family's secrets to the readers.
