= Josephinum Academy =

Josephinum Academy of the Sacred Heart
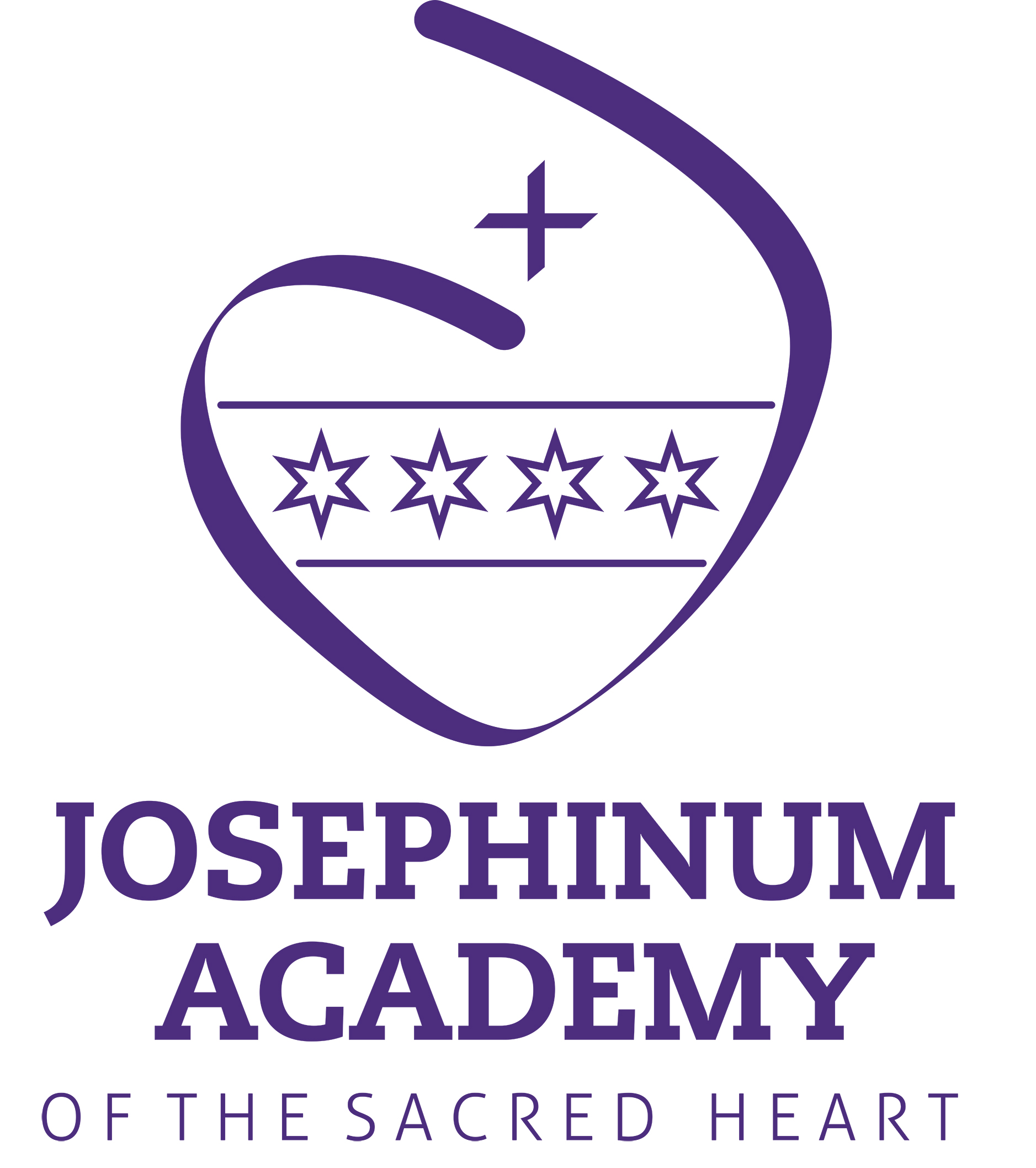

Location
- 1501 North Oakley Boulevard; Chicago, Illinois 60622; United States; 41°54′32″N 87°41′3″W

Information
- Type: Private
- Denomination: Roman Catholic
- Established: 1890; 136 years ago
- Founder: Sisters of Christian Charity
- Oversight: Archdiocese of Chicago
- School code: 140-910
- President: Patti Tuomey, EdD
- Principal: Colleen Schrantz
- Grades: 9–12
- Gender: all-female
- Enrollment: 180
- Average class size: 18
- Student to teacher ratio: 8:1
- Color: Purple
- Athletics conference: Girls Catholic Athletic Conference
- Sports: Basketball, Soccer, Softball, and Volleyball
- Mascot: Josie the Cougar
- Nickname: The Jo
- Publication: www.josephinum.org/news-media/conversation-piece
- Affiliation: Sacred Heart Network of Schools
- Website: www.josephinum.org

Josephinum Academy of the Sacred Heart is a private Catholic all-girls high school in Chicago, Illinois. It is located in the Archdiocese of Chicago.

== History ==
In September 1886, Mother Philomena Schmittdiel, superior of the North American Province of the Sisters of Christian Charity, buried a small statue of St. Joseph in an empty field across the street from St. Aloysius Church. This was the symbol of her intention to buy the property on Oakley Boulevard and build a school for girls that she would call St. Joseph's Academy. When the building opened to students in September 1890, a single Latin word, "Josephinum," which roughly translates as "the house of Joseph," was carved above the entrance portico.

The name was embraced, and the school was called "Josephinum Academy" until 1923 when Cardinal Mundelein made Josephinum a regional Catholic High School and renamed it "Josephinum High School." The school then readopted the name "Josephinum Academy" in 2000 with the introduction of a middle school, which has since been phased out. Meanwhile, generations of Josephinum students have passed down an affectionate nickname for the school: "The Jo."

After the Religious of the Sacred Heart assumed the educational direction of Josephinum Academy, with the blessing of the Sisters of Christian Charity, the Network of Sacred Heart Schools promoted Josephinum to full membership on April 11, 2011. The strong partnership between the Sisters of Christian Charity and the Society of the Sacred Heart that harkens back to the orders’ founders, Pauline von Mallinckrodt and Saint Madeleine Sophie Barat, lives on through the orders’ collaboration at Josephinum.

== Notable alumnae ==
- Sandra Cisneros, author (The House on Mango Street)
- Desiree Pepper Venzant, Executive Director, HFS Chicago Scholars
