= Sandra Cisneros =

American writer (born 1954)

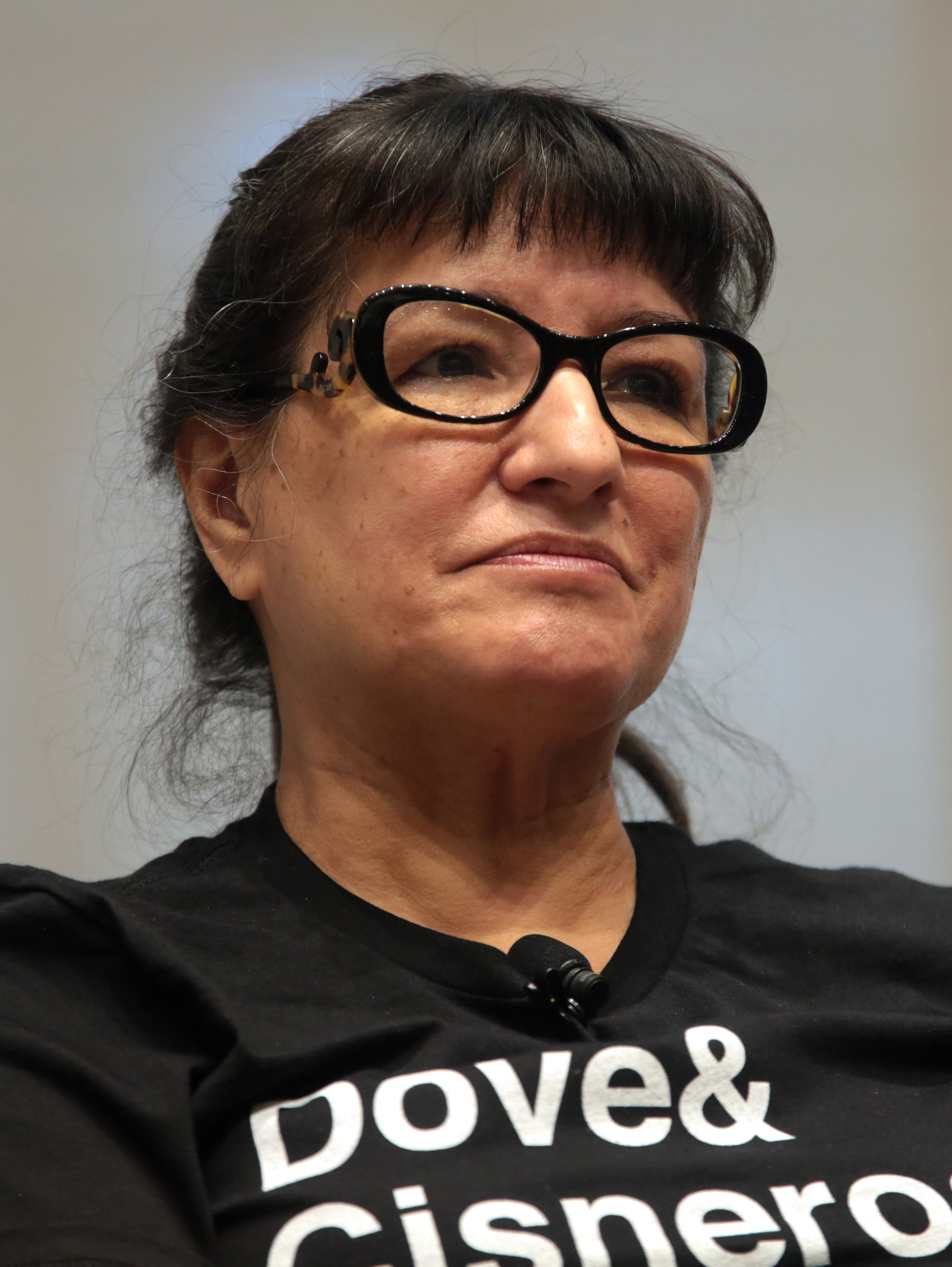
- Cisneros in 2017
- Born: December 20, 1954 (age 71); Chicago, Illinois, U.S.
- Education: Loyola University Chicago (BA); University of Iowa (MFA)
- Occupations: Novelist; poet; short story writer; artist
- Writing career
- Period: c. 1980–present
- Notable works: The House on Mango Street, Woman Hollering Creek and Other Stories
- Notable awards: American Book Award, MacArthur Genius Grant
- Website: sandracisneros.com

Sandra Cisneros (born December 20, 1954) is an American writer. She is best known for her first novel, The House on Mango Street (1984), and her subsequent short story collection, Woman Hollering Creek and Other Stories (1991). Her work includes experimentation with emerging subject positions, which she attributes to growing up in a context of cultural hybridity and economic inequality that endowed her with unique stories to tell. She is the recipient of numerous awards, including a National Endowment for the Arts Fellowship. Regarded as a key figure in Chicano literature, she was awarded one of 25 new Ford Foundation Art of Change fellowships in 2017.

Cisneros's early life provided many experiences that she later drew on as a writer: she grew up as the only daughter in a family of six brothers, which often made her feel isolated, and the constant movement of her family between Mexico and the United States instilled in her the sense of "always straddling two countries but not belonging to either culture." Cisneros's work deals with the formation of Chicana identity, exploring the challenges of being caught between Mexican and Anglo-American cultures, facing the misogynist attitudes present in both these cultures and experiencing poverty. For her insightful social critique and powerful prose style, Cisneros has achieved recognition beyond Chicano and Latino communities, to the extent that The House on Mango Street has been translated worldwide, and is taught in U.S. classrooms as a coming-of-age novel.

Cisneros has held a variety of professional positions, working as a teacher, a counselor, a college recruiter, a poet-in-the-schools, and an arts administrator, and she has maintained a strong commitment to community and literary causes. In 1998, she established the Macondo Writers Workshop, which provides socially conscious workshops for writers. In 2000, she founded the Alfredo Cisneros Del Moral Foundation, which awards talented writers connected to Texas. Cisneros currently resides in Mexico.

== Early life and education ==
Cisneros was born in Chicago, Illinois, on December 20, 1954, to a family of Mexican heritage, the third of seven children. The only surviving daughter, she considered herself the "odd number, in a set of men." Cisneros's great-grandfather had played the piano for the Mexican president and was from a wealthy background, but he gambled away his family's fortune. Her paternal grandfather, Enrique, was a veteran of the Mexican Revolution, and he used what money he had saved to give her father, Alfredo Cisneros de Moral, the opportunity to go to college. However, after failing classes, due to what Cisneros called his "lack of interest" in studying, Alfredo ran away to the United States, in an effort to escape his father's anger. While roaming the southern United States with his brother, Alfredo visited Chicago, where he met Elvira Cordero Anguiano. After getting married, the pair settled in one of Chicago's poorest neighborhoods. Cisneros's biographer, Robin Ganz, writes that she acknowledges her mother's family came from a very humble background, tracing its roots back to the Mexican state of Guanajuato, while her father's was much more "admirable".

Taking work as an upholsterer to support his family, Cisneros's father began "a compulsive circular migration between Chicago and Mexico City that became the dominating pattern of Cisneros's childhood." Their family was constantly moving between the two cities, which necessitated their finding new places to live, as well as schools for the children. Eventually, the instability caused Cisneros's six brothers to pair off in twos, leaving her to define herself as the isolated one. Her feelings of exclusion from the family were exacerbated by her father, who referred to his seis hijos y una hija ("six sons and one daughter") rather than his siete hijos ("seven children"). Ganz notes that Cisneros's childhood loneliness was instrumental in shaping her later passion for writing. Cisneros's one strong female influence was her mother, Elvira, who was a voracious reader and more enlightened and socially conscious than her father.

Her family made a down payment on their own home in Humboldt Park, a predominantly Puerto Rican neighborhood on Chicago's West Side, when she was eleven years old. This neighborhood and its characters would later become the inspiration for Cisneros's novel The House on Mango Street. For high school, Cisneros attended Josephinum Academy which is a small Catholic all-girls school. Here, she found an ally in a high-school teacher who helped her to write poems about the Vietnam War. Although Cisneros had written her first poem around the age of ten with her teacher's encouragement, she became known for her writing throughout her high school years.

Cisneros was awarded a Bachelor of Arts degree from Loyola University Chicago in 1976, and she received a Master of Fine Arts degree, from the Iowa Writers' Workshop at the University of Iowa in 1978. At Loyola, she had an affair with a professor that she calls a "secret life [from] when I was a junior through Iowa that tormented me and that I wrote about, in my poetry". She describes the abusive relationship as "very damaging to me" and is "why my writing is always dealing with sexuality and wickedness".

While attending the Workshop, Cisneros discovered how the particular social position she occupied gave her writing a unique potential, recalling: "It wasn't as if I didn't know who I was. I knew I was a Mexican woman. But I didn't think it had anything to do with why I felt so much imbalance, in my life, whereas it had everything to do with it! My race, my gender, and my class! And it didn't make sense, until that moment, sitting in that seminar. That's when I decided I would write about something my classmates couldn't write about." She conformed to American literary canons and adopted a writing style that was purposely opposite that of her classmates, realizing that instead of being something to be ashamed of, her own cultural environment was a source of inspiration. From then on, she would write of her "neighbors, the people [she] saw, the poverty that the women had gone through."

Cisneros says of this moment:

So to me it began there, and that's when I intentionally started writing about all the things in my culture that were different from them—the poems that are these city voices—the first part of Wicked Wicked ways—and the stories in House on Mango Street. I think it's ironic that at the moment when I was practically leaving an institution of learning, I began realizing in which ways institutions had failed me.

Drawing on Mexican and Southwestern popular culture and conversations in the city streets, Cisneros wrote to convey the lives of people she identified with. Literary critic Jacqueline Doyle has described Cisneros's passion for hearing the personal stories that people tell and her commitment to expressing the voices of marginalized people through her work, such as the "thousands of silent women," whose struggles are portrayed in The House on Mango Street.

Five years after receiving her MFA, she returned to Loyola University-Chicago, where she had previously earned a BA in English, to work as an administrative assistant. Prior to this job, she worked in Pilsen and Little Village, predominately Mexican neighborhoods, in Chicago, and teaching high school dropouts at Latino Youth High School.

== Later life and career ==
=== Teaching ===
In addition to being an author and poet, Cisneros has held various academic and teaching positions. In 1978, after finishing her MFA degree, she taught former high-school dropouts at the Latino Youth High School in Chicago. The 1984 publication of The House on Mango Street secured her a succession of writer-in-residence posts at universities in the United States, teaching creative writing at institutions such as the University of California, Berkeley and the University of Michigan. She was, subsequently, a writer-in-residence at Our Lady of the Lake University, in San Antonio, Texas. Cisneros has also worked as a college recruiter and as an arts administrator.

=== Family ===
Cisneros currently resides in San Miguel de Allende, Guanajuato, in central Mexico, but for years she lived and wrote in San Antonio, Texas, in her briefly controversial "Mexican-pink" home, with "many creatures little and large". In 1990, when Pilar E. Rodríguez Aranda asked Cisneros in an interview for the Americas Review why she has never married or started a family, Cisneros replied, "I've never seen a marriage that is as happy as my living alone. My writing is my child, and I don't want anything to come between us." She has elaborated elsewhere that she enjoys living alone, because it gives her time to think and write. In the introduction to the third edition of Gloria E. Anzaldúa's Borderlands/La Frontera: The New Mestiza, Cisneros wrote: "It's why I moved from Illinois to Texas. So that the relatives and family would allow me the liberty to disappear into myself. To reinvent myself, if I had to. As Latinas, we have to."

=== Writing process ===
Cisneros's writing is often influenced by her personal experiences and by observations of many of the people in her community. She once confided to other writers, at a conference in Santa Fe, that she writes down "snippets of dialogue or monologue—records of conversations she hears, wherever she goes." These snippets are then mixed and matched to create her stories. Names for her characters often come from the San Antonio phone book; "she leafs through the listings for a last name, then repeats the process, for a first name."

Cisneros once found herself so immersed in the characters of her book Woman Hollering Creek that they began to infiltrate her subconscious mind. Once, while she was writing the story "Eyes of Zapata," she awoke "in the middle of the night, convinced, for the moment, that she was Ines, the young bride of the Mexican revolutionary. Her dream conversation with Zapata then became those characters' dialogue in her story."

Her biculturalism and bilingualism are also very important aspects of her writing. Cisneros was quoted by Robin Ganz as saying that she is grateful to have "twice as many words to pick from ... two ways of looking at the world," and Ganz referred to her "wide range of experience" as a "double-edged sword."

=== Community legacy ===
Cisneros has been instrumental in building a strong community in San Antonio, among other artists and writers through her work with the Macondo Writers Workshop and the Alfredo Cisneros del Moral Foundation. The Macondo Foundation, which is named after the town in Gabriel García Márquez's book One Hundred Years of Solitude, "works with dedicated and compassionate writers who view their work and talents as part of a larger task of community-building and non-violent social change." Officially incorporated in 2006, the foundation began in 1998 as a small workshop that took place in Cisneros's kitchen. The Macondo Writers Workshop, which has since become an annual event, brings together writers "working on geographic, cultural, economic, social and spiritual borders" and has grown from 15 participants to more than 120 participants in the first nine years. Currently working out of Our Lady of the Lake University in San Antonio, the Macondo Foundation makes awards such as the Gloria E. Anzaldúa Milagro Award, honoring the memory of Anzaldúa, a fellow Chicana writer who died in 2004, by providing Chicano writers with support when they are in need of some time to heal their "body, heart, or spirit" and the Elvira Cordero Cisneros Award, which was created in memory of Sandra Cisneros's mother. Macondo offers services to member writers such as health insurance and the opportunity to participate in the Casa Azul Residency Program. The Residency Program provides writers with a furnished room and office in the Casa Azul, a blue house across the street from where Cisneros lives in San Antonio, which is also the headquarters of the Macondo Foundation. In creating this program, Cisneros "imagined the Casa as a space where Macondistas could retreat from the distractions of everyday life and have a room of his/her own for the process of emotional, intellectual and spiritual introspection".

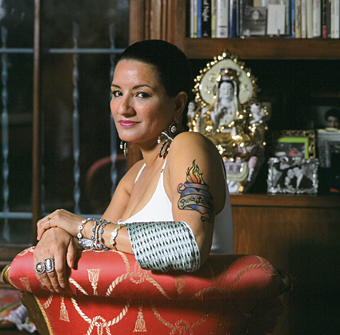
Cisneros in 2009

Cisneros founded the Alfredo Cisneros del Moral Foundation in 1999. Named in memory of her father, the foundation "has awarded over $75,500 to writers born in Texas, writing about Texas, or living in Texas since 2007". Its intention is to honor Cisneros's father's memory by showcasing writers who are as proud of their craft as Alfredo was of his craft as an upholsterer.

With Bryce Milligan, Cisneros co-founded the Annual Texas Small Bookfair, the forerunner to the Inter-American Bookfair.

=== Chicano literary movement ===
Literary critic Claudia Sadowski-Smith has called Cisneros "perhaps the most famous Chicana writer", and Cisneros has been acknowledged as a pioneer in her literary field as the first female Mexican-American writer to have her work published by a mainstream publisher. In 1989, The House on Mango Street, which was originally published by the small Hispanic publishing company Arte Público Press was reissued in a second edition by Vintage Press, and in 1991, Woman Hollering Creek was published by Random House. As Ganz observes, previously, only male Chicano authors had successfully made the crossover, from smaller publishers. That Cisneros had garnered enough attention to be taken on by Vintage Press said a lot about the possibility for Chicano literature to become more widely recognized. Cisneros spoke of her success and what it meant for Chicana literature, in an interview on National Public Radio on 19 September 1991:

I think I can't be happy if I'm the only one that's getting published by Random House when I know there are such magnificent writers – both Latinos and Latinas, both Chicanos and Chicanas – in the U.S. whose books are not published by mainstream presses or whom the mainstream isn't even aware of. And, you know, if my success means that other presses will take a second look at these writers ... and publish them in larger numbers, then our ship will come in.

As a pioneer Chicana author, Cisneros filled a void by bringing to the fore a genre that had previously been at the margins of mainstream literature. With her first novel, The House on Mango Street, she moved away from the poetic style that was common in Chicana literature, at the time, and she began to define a "distinctive Chicana literary space", challenging familiar literary forms and addressing subjects such as gender inequality and the marginalization of cultural minorities. According to literary critic Alvina E Quintana, The House on Mango Street is a book that has reached beyond the Chicano and Latino literary communities and is now read by people of all ethnicities. Quintana states that Cisneros's writing is accessible for both Anglo- and Mexican-Americans, alike, since it is free from anger or accusation, presenting the issues (such as Chicana identity and gender inequalities) in an approachable way. Cisneros's writing has been influential in shaping both Chicana and feminist literature. Quintana sees her fiction as a form of social commentary, contributing to a literary tradition that resembles the work of contemporary cultural anthropologists, in its attempt to authentically represent the cultural experience of a group of people, and acknowledges Cisneros's contribution to Chicana feminist aesthetics, by bringing women to the center as empowered protagonists in much of her work.

== Writing style ==
=== Bilingualism ===
Cisneros often incorporates Spanish into her English writing, using Spanish where she feels that it better conveys the meaning or improves the rhythm of the passage. However, where possible, she constructs sentences so non-Spanish speakers can infer the meaning of Spanish words from their context. In Woman Hollering Creek and Other Stories Cisneros writes: "La Gritona. Such a funny name for such a lovely arroyo. But that's what they called the creek that ran behind the house." Even if the English-speaking reader does not initially know that arroyo means creek, Cisneros soon translates it in a way that does not interrupt the flow of the text. She enjoys manipulating the two languages, creating new expressions in English by literally translating Spanish phrases. In the same book, Cisneros writes: "And at the next full moon, I gave light, Tía Chucha holding up our handsome, strong-lunged boy." Previous sentences inform the reader that a baby is being born, but only a Spanish speaker will notice that "I gave light" is a literal translation of the Spanish "dí a luz" which means "I gave birth." Cisneros joins other Hispanic-American US writers such as Gloria Anzaldúa, Piri Thomas, Giannina Braschi, Gustavo Pérez Firmat, and Junot Díaz, who create playful linguistic hybrids of Spanish and English. Cisneros noted on this process: "All of a sudden, something happens to the English, something really new is happening, a new spice is added to the English language." Spanish always has a role in Cisneros's work, even when she writes in English. As she discovered, after writing The House on Mango Street primarily in English, "the syntax, the sensibility, the diminutives, the way of looking at inanimate objects" were all characteristic of Spanish. For Cisneros, Spanish brings to her work not only colorful expressions, but also a distinctive rhythm and attitude.

=== Narrative modes, diction, and apparent simplicity ===
Cisneros's fiction comes in various forms—as novels, poems, and short stories—by which she challenges both social conventions, with her "celebratory breaking of sexual taboos and trespassing across the restrictions that limit the lives and experiences of Chicanas", and literary ones, with her "bold experimentation with literary voice and her development of a hybrid form that weaves poetry into prose".

Works by Cisneros can appear simple at first reading, but this is deceptive. She invites the reader to move beyond the text by recognizing larger social processes within the microcosm of everyday life: the phone conversation in "The Marlboro Man" is not merely idle gossip, but a text that allows the reader to dig into the characters' psyches and analyze their cultural influences. Literary critics have noted how Cisneros tackles complex theoretical and social issues through the vehicle of apparently simple characters and situations. For example, Ramón Saldívar observes that The House on Mango Street "represents from the simplicity of childhood vision the enormously complex process of the construction of the gendered subject". In the same vein, Felicia J. Cruz describes how each individual will interact differently with Woman Hollering Creek and Other Stories, thus eliciting such varied reader responses as "it is about growing up", to "it's about a Chicana's growing up", to "it is a critique of patriarchal structures and exclusionary practices". Cisneros's writing is rich not only for its symbolism and imagery, deemed by critic Deborah L Madsen to be "both technically and aesthetically accomplished", but also for its social commentary and power to "evoke highly personal responses".

== Literary themes ==
=== Place ===
When Cisneros describes the aspirations and struggles of Chicanas, the theme of place often emerges. Place refers not only to her novels' geographic locations, but also to the positions her characters hold, within their social context. Chicanas frequently occupy Anglo-dominated and male-dominated places, where they are subject to a variety of oppressive and prejudicial behaviors; one of these places that is of particular interest to Cisneros is the home. As literary critics Deborah L. Madsen and Ramón Saldívar have described, the home can be an oppressive place for Chicanas, where they are subjugated to the will of male heads-of-household, or in the case of their own home, it can be an empowering place, where they can act autonomously and express themselves, creatively. In The House on Mango Street, the young protagonist, Esperanza, longs to have her own house: "Not a flat. Not an apartment in back. Not a man's house. Not a daddy's. A house all my own. With my porch and my pillow, my pretty purple petunias. My books and my stories. My two shoes waiting beside the bed. Nobody to shake a stick at. Nobody's garbage to pick up after." An aspiring writer, Esperanza yearns for "a space for myself to go, clean as paper before the poem." She feels discontented and trapped in her family home, and she witnesses other women in the same position. According to Saldívar, Cisneros communicates, through this character, that a woman needs her own place, to realize her full potential—a home which is not a site of patriarchal violence, but instead "a site of poetic self-creation." One source of conflict and grief, for Cisneros's Chicana characters, is that the male-dominated society in which they live denies them this place. Critics such as Jacqueline Doyle and Felicia J. Cruz have compared this theme in Cisneros's work to one of the key concepts in Virginia Woolf's famous essay "A Room of One's Own", that "a woman must have money and a room of her own, if she is to write fiction," or, put another way, "economic security" and personal liberty are necessary for "artistic production".

Cisneros explores the issue of place in relation not only to gender but also to class. As Saldívar has noted, "Aside from the personal requirement of a gendered woman's space, Esperanza recognizes the collective requirements of the working poor and the homeless, as well." He refers to Esperanza's determination not to forget her working-class roots, once she obtains her dream house, and to open her doors to those who are less fortunate. Esperanza says "Passing bums will ask, Can I come in? I'll offer them the attic, ask them to stay, because I know how it is to be without a house." According to Saldívar, this statement of Esperanza's alludes to "the necessity for a decent living space" that is fundamental to all people, despite the different oppressions they face.

=== Construction of femininity and female sexuality ===
As Madsen has described, Cisneros's "effort to negotiate a cross-cultural identity is complicated by the need to challenge the deeply rooted patriarchal values of both Mexican and American cultures." The lives of all Cisneros's female characters are affected by how femininity and female sexuality are defined within this patriarchal value system and they must struggle to rework these definitions. As Cisneros has said: "There's always this balancing act, we've got to define what we think is fine for ourselves instead of what our culture says."

Cisneros shows how Chicanas, like women of many other ethnicities, internalize these norms starting at a young age, through informal education by family members and popular culture. In The House on Mango Street, for example, a group of girl characters speculate about what function a woman's hips have: "They're good for holding a baby when you're cooking, Rachel says ... You need them to dance, says Lucy ... You gotta know how to walk with hips, practice you know." Traditional female roles, such as childrearing, cooking, and attracting male attention, are understood by Cisneros's characters to be their biological destiny. However, when they reach adolescence and womanhood, they must reconcile their expectations about love and sex with their own experiences of disillusionment, confusion and anguish. Esperanza describes her "sexual initiation"—an assault by a group of Anglo-American boys while awaiting her friend Sally at the fairground. She feels stricken and powerless after this, but above all betrayed; not only by Sally, who was not there for her, but "by all the women who ever failed to contradict the romantic mythology of love and sex".

When Cisneros addresses the subject of female sexuality, she often portrays negative scenarios in which men exert control over women through control over their sexuality, and explores the gap she perceives between the real sexual experiences of women and their idealized representation in popular culture. However, Cisneros also describes female sexuality in extremely positive terms, especially in her poetry. This is true, for example, of her 1987 volume of poetry My Wicked, Wicked Ways. According to Madsen, Cisneros refers to herself as "wicked" for having "reappropriated, taken control of, her own sexuality and the articulation of it – a power forbidden to women under patriarchy". Through these poems she aims to represent "the reality of female sexuality" so that women readers will recognize the "divisive effects" of the stereotypes that they are expected to conform to, and "discover the potential for joy in their bodies that is denied them".

Cisneros breaks the boundary between what is a socially acceptable way for women to act and speak and what is not, using language and imagery that have a "boisterous humor" and "extrovert energy" and are even at times "deliberately shocking". Not all readers appreciate this "shocking" quality of some of Cisneros's work. Both female and male readers have criticized Cisneros for the ways she celebrates her sexuality, such as the suggestive photograph of herself on the My Wicked, Wicked Ways cover (3rd Woman Press, 1987). Cisneros says of this photo: "The cover is of a woman appropriating her own sexuality. In some ways, that's also why it's wicked: the scene is trespassing that boundary by saying 'I defy you. I'm going to tell my own story.'" Some readers "failed to perceive the transgressive meaning of the gesture", thinking that she was merely being lewd for shock value, and questioned her legitimacy as a feminist. Cisneros's initial response to this was dismay, but then she reports thinking "Wait a second, where's your sense of humor? And why can't a feminist be sexy?"

=== Construction of Chicana identity ===
The challenges faced by Cisneros's characters on account of their gender cannot be understood in isolation from their culture, for the norms that dictate how women and men ought to think and behave are culturally determined and thus distinct for different cultural groups. Through her works, Cisneros conveys the experiences of Chicanas confronting the "deeply rooted patriarchal values" of Mexican culture through interactions not only with Mexican fathers, but the broader community which exerts pressure upon them to conform to a narrow definition of womanhood and a subservient position to men.

A recurrent theme in Cisneros's work is the triad of figures that writer and theorist Gloria Anzaldúa has referred to as "Our Mothers": the Virgen de Guadalupe, La Malinche and La Llorona. These symbolic figures are of great importance to identity politics and popular culture in Mexico and the southwest United States, and have been used, argues theorist Norma Alarcón, as reference points "for controlling, interpreting, or visualizing women" in Mexican-American culture.

Many theorists, including Jacqueline Doyle, Jean Wyatt, Emma Perez and Cordelia Candelaria, have argued that the gender identity of Mexican and Chicana women is complexly constructed in reference to these three figures. La Virgen de Guadalupe, a Catholic icon of the manifestation of the Virgin Mary in the Americas, is revered in Mexico as a "nurturing and inspiring mother and maiden". La Malinche, the indigenous mistress and intermediary of conquistador Hernán Cortés, has according to Wyatt "become the representative of a female sexuality at once passive, "rapeable", and always already guilty of betrayal". Cisneros describes the problematic dichotomy of the virgin and the whore presented by these two figures: "We're raised in a Mexican culture that has two role models: La Malinche and la Virgen de Guadalupe. And you know that's a hard route to go, one or the other, there's no in-betweens." Madsen has noted that these 'good' and 'bad' archetypes are further complicated by the perception, held by many Chicana feminists, that they would be guilty of betraying their people, like La Malinche, if they attempt to define their femininity in more "Anglo" terms. Through her work, Cisneros critiques the pressures Chicanas face to suppress their sexuality or channel it into socially acceptable forms so as to not be labeled "Malinchista[s] ... corrupted by gringa influences which threaten to splinter [their] people".

The third figure, La Llorona, who derives from a centuries-old Mexican/Southwestern folktale, is "a proud young girl [who] marries above her station and is so enraged when her husband takes a mistress of his own class that she drowns their children in the river". She dies grief-stricken by the edge of the river after she is unable to retrieve her children and it is claimed that she can be heard wailing for them in the sound of the wind and water. These entities – from the gentle and pure Virgen de Guadalupe, to the violated and treacherous la Malinche, to the eternally grieving la Llorona – give rise to a "fragmentary subjectivity" often experienced by Chicanas, and their need to come to terms with them, renegotiate them on their own terms, or reject them altogether.

The three "Mothers" come out most clearly in Woman Hollering Creek and Other Stories. In the stories "Never Marry a Mexican" and "Woman Hollering Creek", the female protagonists grapple with these "Mexican icons of sexuality and motherhood that, internalized, seem to impose on them a limited and even negative definition of their own identities as women". The protagonist in "Never Marry a Mexican" is haunted by the myth of la Malinche, who is considered a whore and a traitor, and defies la Malinche's passive sexuality with her own aggressive one. In "Woman Hollering Creek" the protagonist reinvents the la Llorona myth when she decides to take charge of her own future, and that of her children, and discovers that the grito of the myth, which is the Spanish word for the sound made by la Llorona, can be interpreted as a "joyous holler" rather than a grieving wail. It is the borderland, that symbolic middle ground between two cultures, which "offers a space where such a negotiation with fixed gender ideals is at least possible".

=== Borderlands ===
Even though Cisneros does not explicitly locate her stories and novels on the Mexico-U.S. border, Sadowski-Smith identifies the concept as perhaps Cisneros's most salient theme due to the constant border crossings, both real and metaphorical, of characters in all of her works. The House on Mango Street takes place in Chicago where the narrator lives, and in Mexico City where she visits extended family. Caramelo primarily takes place in those settings as well, but part of the book details the narrator's experiences as a teenager in San Antonio, Texas. Various characters in Woman Hollering Creek and Other Stories also make trips to Mexico to reunite with family members. However, to quote literary critics Jesús Benito and Ana María Manzanas, the "image of the border has become fully meaningful not only when we consider it as a physical line but when we decenter it and liberate it from the notion of space to encompass notions of sex, class, gender, ethnicity, identity, and community". Cisneros frequently divorces the border from its strictly geographic meaning, using it metaphorically to explore how Chicana identity is an amalgamation of both Mexican and Anglo-American cultures. The border represents the everyday experiences of people who are neither fully from one place nor the other; at times the border is fluid and two cultures can coexist harmoniously within a single person, but at other times it is rigid and there is an acute tension between them. Literary critic Katherine Payant has analyzed the border metaphor in Woman Hollering Creek and Other Stories, which manifests in references to the Chicana/o characters' Mexican roots and the (im)migration between the two countries, the recurrence of overlapping pre-Columbian, mestizo and Southwestern Chicano myths, and the portrayal of Chicanas/os as "straddling two or three cultures". Payant makes use of Gloria Anzaldúa's concept of living "on the borderlands" to describe the experience of Cisneros's Chicana characters who, in addition to their struggle to overcome patriarchal constructs of their gender and sexual identity, must negotiate linguistic and cultural boundaries.

== Personal life ==
Cisneros practices Buddhism. She has been deeply influenced by the gay community: "I think I’ve been influenced a lot by the gay community in how they've taken language as a way to empower themselves, because language does matter." She discussed this relationship in a 2024 lecture called "Keeping San Antonio Lamé: My Life Among los Artistas," delivered at Trinity University in San Antonio.

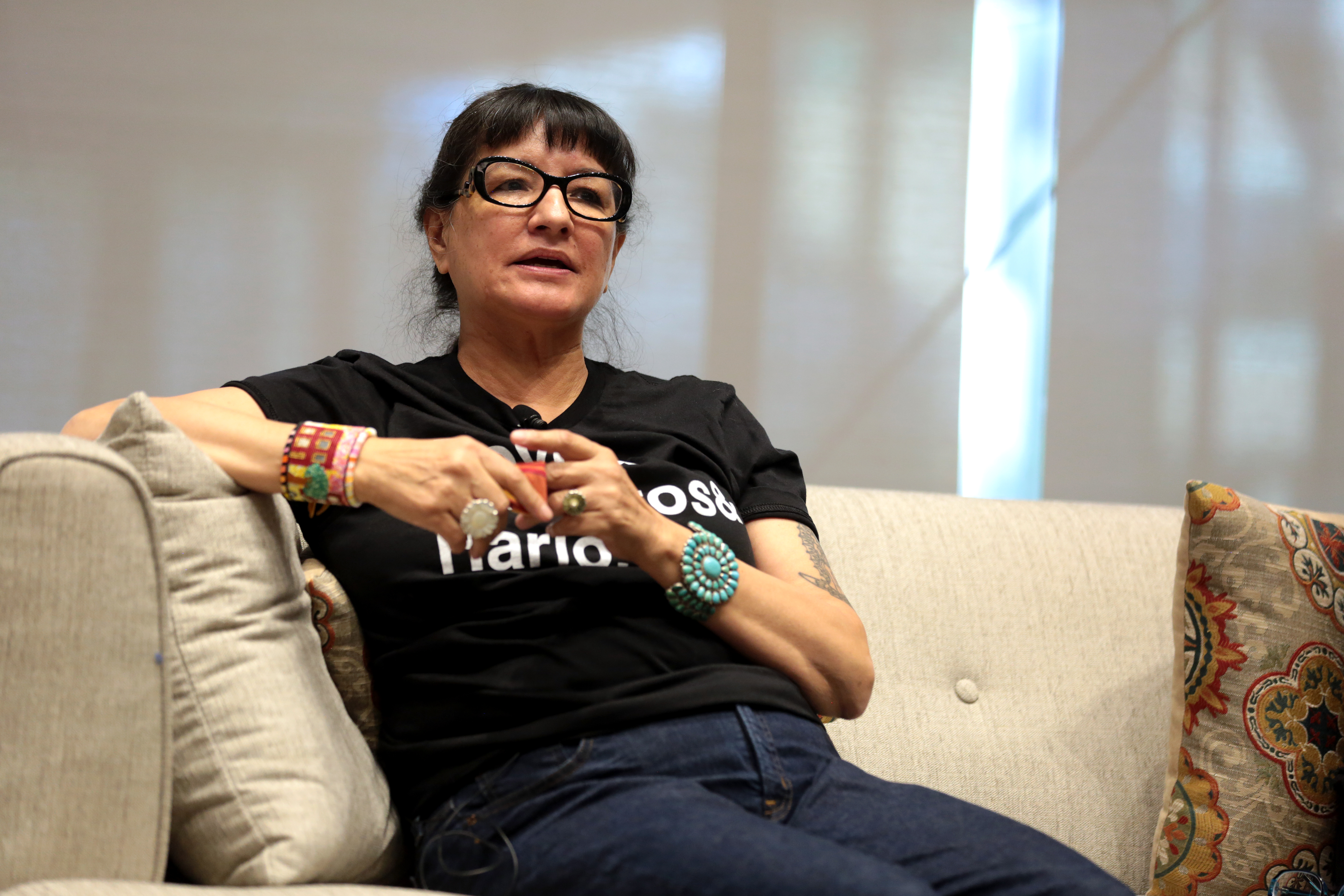
Cisneros in 2017

Queer identity is a theme she alludes to in her work. She gave a reading of "Infinito", a work in progress in 2025, in which the narrator is a gay man.

In A House of My Own, Cisneros discusses the importance of her friendship with gay men—many of them artists—in San Antonio, and of cultivating and supporting the arts. She developed a close friendship with artists such as Angel Rodriguez-Diaz, and she collected art and patronized artists in San Antonio.

Cisneros did not have children because she would have had to move back to Chicago to both have children and continue writing books: "I don't have children but that was my choice. It was a choice that I made because I felt that I'm either going to have children or I'm going to be able to write books or if I'm going to write books and have children, I'm going to have to move back to Chicago. And I never wanted to do that."

== Arts patronage ==
For Cisneros, the creation of an art-rich environment was vital for her writing. She made this point in the chapter "!Que Vivan los Colores!" in her 2015 book A House of My Own: Stories From My Life. She explains how she became a collector in the chapter "Tenemos Layaway, Or How I Became an Art Collector," in that same book. In the latter chapter, she says that by learning how to properly rearrange her art objects, she created a "beauty that heals."

Her "Purple House" in San Antonio, whose external colors precipitated controversy with the local historic society, served as the locus of her writing and creative activity. Art objects Cisneros gathered in the house were featured in an installation curated by Franco Mondini Ruiz in 1998 at Blue Star in San Antonio (now called Contemporary at Blue Star). It has been argued that her house constituted "an aesthetic wonderhouse of all of the things that she had gathered together in years of peripatetic wandering," and that "Her house and its decor had become a life-sustaining necessity."

Two portraits of Cisneros, both by Angel Rodríguez-Díaz, are in the permanent collections of major museums: The Protagonist of an Endless Story (1993) is in the Smithsonian American Art Museum, and La Guadalupana (1999) is in the National Museum of Mexican Art. Cisneros did not like the first one, which she had not commissioned, but, as she noted in her Keeping San Antonio Lamé lecture, "I felt obligated to buy the portrait because he had worked so hard on it and had no money, and I did." In time, she came to like the painting. She disliked the second painting even more, but bought it without telling the artist to spare his feelings. Cisneros ultimately donated the painting to the museum.

Cisneros traded The Protagonist of an Endless Story back to the artist for two of his three "Goddess" paintings, which were monumental nudes depicting woman of color. Cisneros relates how she felt uncomfortable with her body in her short story "Guadalupe the Sex Goddess". She valued the Goddess paintings because "They were comfortable in their skin, I loved their exuberance and power. There were no patriarchal or religious hang-ups. I loved that they were women of color, and proud to be." Cisneros enjoyed living with the paintings, and she feels she benefited from their company: "they were like guardian spirits. They made me laugh and feel really happy. I loved their shamelessness. I loved having them."

== Awards ==
At a ceremony in September 2016 was awarded a 2015 National Medal of Arts. In 2019, PEN America awarded her the PEN/Nabokov Award for Achievement in International Literature. In 2023, the Dayton Literary Peace Prize Foundation named her as the year's winner of the Ambassador Richard C. Holbrooke Distinguished Achievement Award. In April 2025, the Authors Guild Foundation awarded her the Baldacci Award for Literary Activism. In February 2026, The American Academy of Arts and Letters announced that she would be a 2026 inductee into memberiship in the Department of Literature.

Cisneros received fellowships from the National Endowment for the Arts in 1981 and 1988, and in 1985 was presented with the American Book Award by the Before Columbus Foundation for The House on Mango Street. Subsequently, she received a Frank Dobie Artists Fellowship, and came first and second in the Segundo Concurso Nacional del Cuento Chicano, sponsored by the University of Arizona.

Cisneros has further received the Quality Paperback Book Club New Voices Award, the Anisfield-Wolf Book Award, the PEN Center West Award for best fiction, and the Lannan Foundation Literary Award for Woman Hollering Creek and Other Stories. This book was selected as the noteworthy book of the year by both The New York Times and The American Library Journal, and an anthology of erotic poetry, Loose Woman, won the Mountain & Plains Booksellers' Award.

Cisneros was recognized by the State University of New York, receiving an honorary doctorate from Purchase in 1993 and a MacArthur fellowship in 1995. In 2003, Caramelo was regarded by several journals including The New York Times, the Los Angeles Times, the San Francisco Chronicle, the Chicago Tribune, and The Seattle Times, which led to her Premio Napoli Award in 2005; the novel also was shortlisted for the Dublin International IMPAC award, and was nominated for the Orange Prize in England. In 2003, Cisneros became part of the second group of recipients of the newly formed Texas Cultural Trust's Texas Medal of Arts. In 2016, the University of North Carolina at Chapel Hill awarded Cisneros an honorary Doctor of Letters. She was honored with the Chicago Literary Hall of Fame's Fuller Award in 2021.

== Works ==
=== Novels ===
- Cisneros, Sandra (1983). The House on Mango Street. Houston: Arte Público. ISBN 978-0-934770-20-0.. Second edition: New York: Vintage, 1989. ISBN 978-0-679-73477-2
- Cisneros, Sandra (2002). Caramelo, or, Puro cuento. New York: Knopf. ISBN 978-1-4000-4150-3.
- Cisneros, Sandra (2012). Have You Seen Marie?. New York: Alfred A. Knopf. ISBN 978-0307597946.
- Cisneros, Sandra (2021). Martita, I Remember You/Martita, te recuerdo. Vintage. ISBN 9780593313664.

=== Short story collections ===
- Cisneros, Sandra (1991). Woman Hollering Creek and Other Stories. New York: Random House. ISBN 978-0-394-57654-1.

=== Poetry ===
- Cisneros, Sandra (1980). Bad Boys. San Jose: Mango.
- Cisneros, Sandra (1987). My Wicked, Wicked Ways. Bloomington, Indiana: Third Woman Press. ISBN 978-0-943219-01-1.
- Cisneros, Sandra (1994). Loose Woman: Poems. New York: Knopf. ISBN 978-0-679-41644-9.
- — (2022). Woman without Shame.

List of poems

| Title | Year | First published | Reprinted/collected |
|---|---|---|---|
| Still-life with potatoes, pearls, raw meat, rhinestones, lard, and horse hooves | 2020 | Cisneros, Sandra (September 7, 2020). "Still-life with potatoes, pearls, raw meat, rhinestones, lard, and horse hooves". The New Yorker. 96 (26): 44–45. | |
| Tea dance, Provincetown, 1982 | 2022 | Cisneros, Sandra (August 22, 2022). "Tea dance, Provincetown, 1982". The New Yorker. 98 (25): 56–57. | |

=== Contributions ===
- Days and Nights of Love and War (2000). By Eduardo Galeano. Contribution by Sandra Cisneros.
- Family Pictures/ Cuadros de Familia (2005). By Carmen Lomas Garza. Introduction by Sandra Cisneros
- Emergency Tacos: Seven Poets Con Picante (2007). By Carlos Cumpian, Sandra Cisneros, Carlos Cortez, Beatriz Badikian, Cynthia Gallaher, Margarita Lopez-Castro, Raul Nino.
- Things We Do Not Talk About: Exploring Latino/a Literature through Essays and Interviews (2014). By Daniel Olivas. Interview of Sandra Cisneros featured in book.

=== Essays and reporting ===
- Cisneros, Sandra (Autumn 2009). "An ofrenda for my mother". Granta (108): 219–224. Archived from the original on 2012-09-27.

=== Other ===
- Cisneros, Sandra (1994). Hairs = Pelitos. New York: Knopf. ISBN 978-0-679-89007-2. (excerpt from The House on Mango Street)
- Cisneros, Sandra (2004). Vintage Cisneros. New York: Vintage. ISBN 978-1-4000-3405-5. (selections of works)
- Cisneros, Sandra (2011). Bravo Bruno. Italy: La Nuova Frontiera. (Italian)
- Cisneros, Sandra (2015). A House of My Own. New York: Knopf. ISBN 978-0-385-35133-1. (memoir)
- Cisneros, Sandra (2018). Puro Amor. Sarabande. ISBN 978-1946448217. (chapbook)

== See also ==
- Mexicans in Chicago
- Macondo Writers Workshop
- Chicana feminism
- American literature in Spanish
- Chicano literature
- Latino poetry

== Works cited ==
- Anzaldúa, Gloria (1987), Borderlands: The New Mestiza = La Frontera, San Francisco: Spinsters / Aunt Lute, ISBN 978-0-933216-25-9.
- Alarcón, Norma (1982), "Chicana's Feminist Literature: A Re-vision Through Malintzin/or Malintzin: Putting Flesh Back on the Object", in Moraga, Cherrie; Anzaldúa, Gloria (eds.), This Bridge Called My Back: Writings by Radical Women of Color, Watertown, MA: Persephone, pp. 182–189, ISBN 978-0-930436-10-0
- Benito, Jesús; Manzanas, Ana María (2002), "Border(lands) and Border Writing: Introductory Essay", in Benito, Jesús; Manzanas, Ana María (eds.), Literature and Ethnicity in the Cultural Borderlands, Amsterdam: Rodopi, pp. 1–21, ISBN 978-90-420-1509-8
- Candelaria, Cordelia (1980), "La Malinche, Feminist Prototype", Frontiers: A Journal of Women Studies, 5 (2): 1–6, doi:10.2307/3346027, JSTOR 3346027.
- Gonzalez, Christopher Thomas, "Hospitable Imaginations: Contemporary Latino/a Literature and the Pursuit of a Readership: Sandra Cisneros, Junot Diaz, Giannina Braschi", Ohio, 2012.
- Candelaria, Cordelia (1993), "Letting La Llorona Go, or Re/reading History's Tender Mercies", Heresies, 7 (3): 111–115
- Cisneros, Sandra (1986), "Cactus Flowers: In Search of Tejana Feminist Poetry", Third Woman, 3 (1–2), University of California, Berkeley: 73–80
- Cruz, Felicia J. (2001), "On the 'Simplicity' of Sandra Cisneros's House on Mango Street", Modern Fiction Studies, 47 (4): 910–946, doi:10.1353/mfs.2001.0078, S2CID 162197208. (Project MUSE subscription required for online access)
- Dasenbrock, Reed Way (1992), "Interview: Sandra Cisneros", in Dasenbrock, Reed Way (ed.), Interviews with Writers of the Post-Colonial World, Jackson: University Press of Mississippi, pp. 287–306, ISBN 978-0-87805-572-2
- Doyle, Jacqueline (Winter 1994), "More Room of Her Own: Sandra Cisneros's The House on Mango Street", MELUS, 19 (4), The Society for the Study of the Multi-Ethnic Literature of the United States (MELUS): 5–35, doi:10.2307/468200, JSTOR 468200. (JSTOR subscription required for online access)
- Doyle, Jacqueline (1996), "Haunting the Borderlands: La Llorona in Sandra Cisneros's Woman Hollering Creek", Frontiers: A Journal of Women Studies, 16 (1), University of Nebraska Press: 53–70, doi:10.2307/3346922, JSTOR 3346922. (JSTOR subscription required for online access)
- Ganz, Robin (Spring 1994), "Sandra Cisneros: Border Crossings and Beyond", MELUS, 19 (1), The Society for the Study of the Multi-Ethnic Literature of the United States (MELUS): 19–29, doi:10.2307/467785, JSTOR 467785. (JSTOR subscription required for online access.)
- Harrington, Patricia (Spring 1988), "Mother of Death, Mother of Rebirth: The Mexican Virgin of Guadalupe", Journal of the American Academy of Religion, 56 (1): 25–50, doi:10.1093/jaarel/lvi.1.25.
- Madsen, Deborah L. (2000), Understanding Contemporary Chicana Literature, Columbia, SC: University of South Carolina Press, ISBN 978-1-57003-379-7
- Payant, Katherine (1999), "Borderland Themes in Sandra Cisneros's Woman Hollering Creek", in Payant, Katherine B.; Rose, Toby (eds.), The Immigrant Experience in North American Literature: Carving Out a Niche, Westport, CT: Greenwood, pp. 95–108, ISBN 978-0-313-30891-8.
- Perez, Emma (1993), "Sexuality and Discourse: Notes from a Chicana Survivor", in Zavella, Patricia; Alarcón, Norma; Castro, Rafaela; Perez, Emma; Pesquera, Beatriz (eds.), Chicana Critical Issues, Berkeley: Third Woman Press, pp. 159–184, ISBN 978-0-943219-09-7.
- Quintana, Alvina E. (1996), Home Girls: Chicana Literary Voices, Philadelphia: Temple University Press, ISBN 978-1-56639-373-7.
- Rodríguez Aranda, Pilar E. (Spring 1990), "On the Solitary Fate of Being Mexican, Female, Wicked and Thirty-three: An Interview with Writer Sandra Cisneros", The Americas Review, 18 (1): 65–80.
- Sadowski-Smith, Claudia (2008), Border Fictions: Globalization, Empire, and Writing at the Boundaries of the United States, Charlottesville: University of Virginia Press, ISBN 978-0-8139-2689-6.
- Sagel, Jim (1991), "Sandra Cisneros: Interview", Publishers Weekly: 74–75.
- Saldívar, Ramón (1990), Chicano Narrative: The Dialectics of Difference, Madison: The University of Wisconsin Press, ISBN 978-0-299-12474-8
- Wyatt, Jean (Autumn 1995), "On Not Being La Malinche: Border Negotiations of Gender in Sandra Cisneros's 'Never Marry a Mexican' and 'Woman Hollering Creek'", Tulsa Studies in Women's Literature, 14 (2), University of Tulsa: 243–271, doi:10.2307/463899, JSTOR 463899. (JSTOR subscription required for online access.)
- Woolf, Virginia (1998), A Room of One's Own, and Three Guineas, Oxford: Oxford University Press, ISBN 978-0-19-283484-3.
